= Alide Topp =

German pianist (1844–1935)

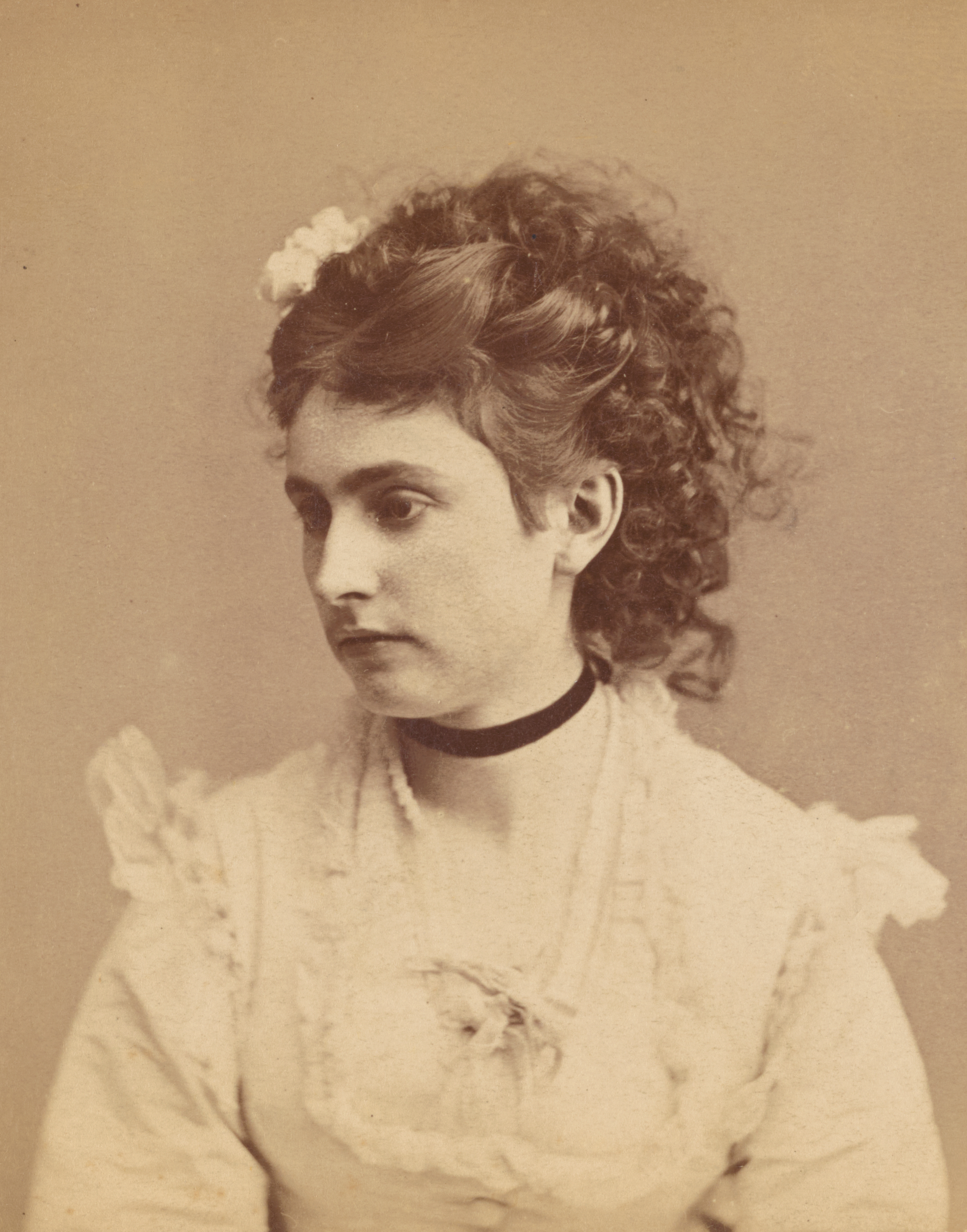
- Alide Topp between 1865 and 1878
- Born: Alide Eleonore Sophie Topp; 22 April 1844; Teterow, Grand Duchy of Mecklenburg-Schwerin
- Died: 7 July 1935 (aged 91); Charlottenburg, German Reich
- Other names: Alida, Alide von Schöler
- Education: Stern Conservatory, Berlin; private student of Hans von Bülow
- Occupation: Classical pianist
- Years active: 1861–1870
- Known for: Liszt interpreter
- Spouse: Franz von Schöler

Alide Topp (22 April 1844 – 7 July 1935) was a German pianist and a representative of the New German School. A protégée of Hans von Bülow, she gained early recognition in Germany for her technical virtuosity and her interpretations of the works of Franz Liszt, who described her playing as a "marvel". Topp served as a court pianist to Constantine, Prince of Hohenzollern-Hechingen, before embarking on a successful concert tour of the United States from 1867 to 1870.

During her years in the US, Topp became a pioneer of the classical piano recital, performing the New York premiere of Liszt's Fantasy on Motifs from Beethoven's Ruins of Athens and becoming one of the first pianists to present solo historical concerts. Her career was marked by her close association with Steinway & Sons and by performances under the batons of Theodore Thomas and Carl Bergmann. In 1870, she was received by President Ulysses S. Grant at the White House.

Following her return to Germany, she withdrew from public life upon her marriage into the Prussian nobility, though historians noted her influence on the American musical landscape well into the 20th century.

== Early life and education ==
Alide Topp (also identified as Alida) (Note: Although her given name was Alide, the spelling "Alida" was sometimes used in contemporary publications. "Alide (or Alida) Topp" by the Boston Symphony Orchestra, see; "Alida" by the German Zeitschrift für Musikwissenschaft, see) was born on 22 April 1844 in Teterow, Mecklenburg-Schwerin, then part of the German Confederation. Her parents were Carl Topp and Dorothea Hagemann. As members of the educated middle class (Bildungsbürgertum), the family's social status was tied to her father's work as a "music publisher and dealer". (Note: The term used in the original source is Musikalienhändler, which specifically refers to a merchant specialising in sheet music and musical instruments. (Digital scan, p. 370, in the MDZ viewer):) Following a relocation to the Hanseatic city of Stralsund in the Prussian Province of Pomerania, the city became her primary residence; she was frequently identified in the contemporary press by her hometown.

Topp studied at the Stern Conservatory in Berlin under the instruction of Hans von Bülow. Her first public appearance occurred in April 1861 at a conservatory examination, where the Neue Berliner Musikzeitung identified her as "perhaps the most talented" performer, specifically praising her execution of the Scherzo from Weber's Sonata Op. 49. (Note: Original German: Von den von uns gehörten Pianistinnen ist Frl. Alide Topp aus Stralsund vielleicht die talentvollste. Sie spielte das Scherzo aus Webers Sonate, op. 49 mit richtiger Empfindung, evidenter Klarheit und Deutlichkeit in den Passagen, die mit Geläufigkeit den Fingern entperlten.) In 1862, Bülow recorded in his journals that Topp was the "most talented and diligent student" he had encountered. (Note: Original German: Frl. Topp. Die talentvollste und eifrigste Schülerin, die ich je im Conservatorium gefunden.) A concert in Stralsund in late 1862 – featuring a program of Beethoven, Schumann, Raff, and Liszt – established her reputation for "memory playing" and technical proficiency. (Note: Original German with concert program (digital scan, p. 417, in the MDZ viewer): Aus Stralsund schreibt man uns Rühmendes über eine junge Clavierspielerin, Fräulein Alide Topp, eine Schülerin von Herrn H. von Bülow in Berlin. In einem öffentlichen Concerte trug sie vor Beethovens Sonate in Es-dur, Op. 31 Nr. III., den Faschingsschwank, Op. 26, von Schumann, das Scherzo aus Weber's As-dur-Sonate, J. Raff's glänzende Transcription des Sextetts aus dem Tannhäuser und Liszt's Venezia e Napoli, eine Ergänzung zu dessen Années de pélérinage. Sie spielte alles auswendig und entwickelte einen hohen Grad von Befähigung und bereits erreichter technischer Fertigkeit.)

In May 1863, Bülow requested special permission from director Julius Stern to continue Topp's instruction privately and without charge, describing the opportunity to foster her talent as an "honour" he "rarely" experienced. (Note: Original German: ..., daß ihre Weiterausbildung mir Ehre machen wird, wie ich sie als Lehrer selten finden kann. Ich würde sie unentgeltlich unterrichten.) She began her career as a "concert virtuoso" the same year. (Note: Original German: ... sie studierte bis 1863 am Stern'schen Konservatorium in Berlin, nach dem Studium erhielt sie weiterhin Unterricht bei Hans von Bülow und begann ihre Karriere als Klaviervirtuosin ...)

== Career ==
=== Germany (1864–1867) ===
==== Beginnings ====
Topp's first post-graduation recital took place in Stralsund in April 1863; the program reprised works by composers from the previous year, supplemented by Bülow's Mazurka-Impromptu, Op. 4. Her interpretations elicited positive reactions, further enhanced by local sentiment for the Stralsund-based pianist. In February 1864, Topp made her Leipzig debut before a "wider public" with the Euterpe Musical Society, performing works by Liszt and Schumann. (Note: Original German: (digital scan, p. 96, in the MDZ viewer): ... zum ersten Male vor die größere Öffentlichkeit ...) Although she might be considered "a beginner", she was noted for an "artistic level" usually reserved for established careers. Reviews highlighted her "fully developed touch", "profound intellectual understanding", and "fiery and vibrant imagination", remarking that her "small, slight figure" possessed an "outstanding depth of soul and willpower". (Note: Original German: (digital scan, p. 98, in the MDZ viewer): Frl. Topp kann dem Publicum gegenüber allerdings eine Anfängerin genannt werden, aber sie fängt gleich auf einer solchen Höhe des Künstlerthums an, wie von gar vielen nicht unerheblichen Claviervirtuosen selbst am Ende ihrer Laufbahn nicht immer erreicht wird . Ihr vielseitiger durch und durch fertig ausgebildeter Anschlag ... Dabei bekundet ihr Vortrag ein so tiefes, geistiges Verständnis, einen solchen feurigen Schwung wiederschaffender Phantasie, daß auch der möglichst kaltsinnige Zuhörer vom Eindrucke solchen Spiels unwillkürlich hingerissen, eingestehen muß, daß in dieser kleinen schmächtigen Gestalt nicht gewöhnliche künstlerische Begabung, ausnahmsweise hervorragende Seelentiefe und Willenskraft sich zeigt.)

==== Liszt's "marvel" ====
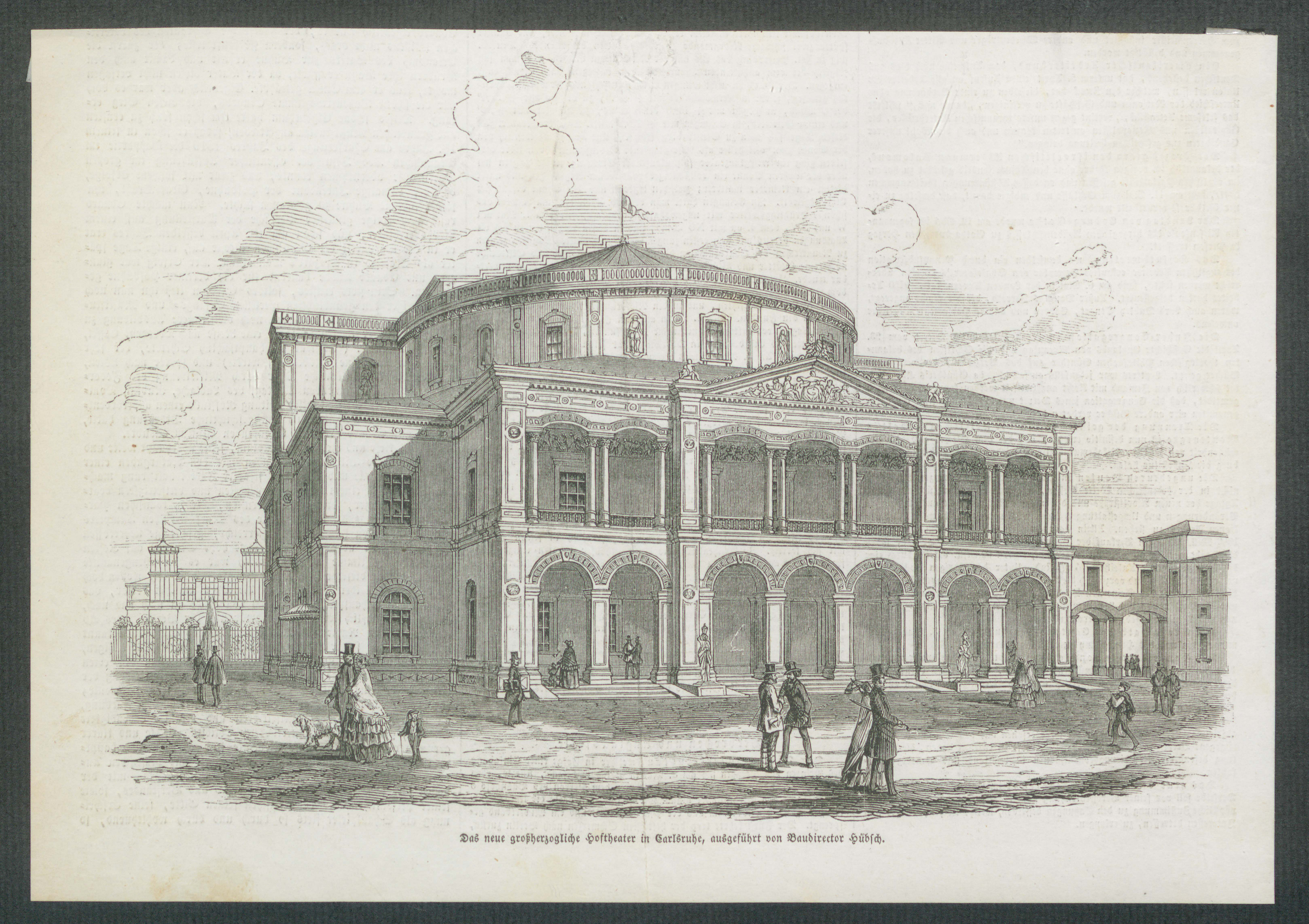
Grand Ducal Court Theatre in 1853

Her career reached a significant turning point in August 1864 at the Third Assembly of German Musicians (Dritte Tonkünstlerversammlung) in Karlsruhe. This annual festival was the primary platform of the General German Music Association (ADMV), founded by Liszt and Franz Brendel and the main forum for the New German School (Neudeutsche Schule). After Bülow declined the festival director role due to illness – a development that, according to Liszt, "deeply affected" him, (Note: Original German: Persönlich und künstlerisch war für mich sein Ausbleiben sehr empfindsam.) Topp replaced the indisposed Ingeborg Starck. (Note: To replace the ailing Bülow, Max Seifriz was hurriedly brought in as festival director, while Alide Topp (a Bülow pupil) stood in for Ingeborg Starck, see:) On 24 August at the Grand Ducal Court Theatre (Großherzogliches Hoftheater), Topp performed Liszt's Piano Sonata in B minor and Mephisto Waltz No. 1 in the composer's presence. Liszt described her interpretation as a "marvel" (Wunder); (Note: '(She) is quite simply a marvel', see:) however, conservative critics dismissed the reception as coming from "writers and dilettantes" of the New German School rather than from "artists". (Note: Original German: Fragen Sie mich nach dem Resultate des Ganzen, .... sei der Applaus selten von Künstlern, meist von Literaten und Dilettanten, die für die neue Schule schwärmen, ausgegangen.) Conversely, the Neue Zeitschrift für Musik praised her "powerful, steely attack" and "finely nuanced" technique, calling her an "epoch-making" talent. (Note: Original German (digital scan, p. 363, in the MDZ viewer): Einem so markigen Stahl-Anschlag, einer so sicher, so klar und dabei so fein ausgestaltenden Nuancierung sind wir neuerdings seit Bülow noch nicht wieder begegnet, zumal bei einer Dame. Hier trat ein ungewöhnliches, epochemachendes Talent an uns heran.) International attention followed; the Strasbourg journal L'Illustration de Bade remarked that at only 17, "such artistic perfection is unique and incredible", noting her ability to "draw sovereign advantage from all the resources of her instrument". (Note: Original French: Son mécanisme est des plus extraordinaires, sa vigueur vraiment gigantesque; il sait tirer un parti souverain de toutes les ressources de son instrument. Mais nous avons été porté à admirer davantage Mlle Alide Topp, parce qu'à son âge (elle n'a que 17 ans), une telle perfection artistique est certainement unique et incroyable.)

By 1865, music critics ranked Topp among the "artistic powerhouses" (künstlerische Kraftnaturen) such as Anna Mehlig, (Note: Original German (digital scan, p. 77, in the MDZ viewer): Solchen künstlerischen Kraftnaturen wie Frl. Topp und Frl. Mehlig ...) alongside "excellent piano virtuosos" like Sara Magnus and Mary Krebs. (Note: Original German (digital scan, p. 62, in the MDZ viewer): Es dürfte wohl zu beachten sein, daß in neuester Zeit der Kreis ausgezeichneter Klaviervirtuosen (im edlen Sinne des Wortes) durch junge Damen in sehr hervorragender Weise bereichert worden ist: wir erinnern vor allem an Alide Topp, Sara Magnus und Mary Krebs.) Despite this recognition, her performances in major German music centres remained rare and took place amidst the Prussian wars of 1864 and 1866 and the associated political unrest. Following a concert in Rostock, a review published on 1 March 1865, urged Topp – in the wake of the War of the Romantics – to "emancipate" herself more strongly from the New German School. The author criticised her preference for Liszt and Karl Tausig over her interpretations of Beethoven, Bach, and Handel, which were described as "interesting and good". (Note: Original German: Die eminenten Vorzüge der jungen Dame sind genugsam bekannt. Möge nur die liebenswürdige Künstlerin sich allmälig mehr von der Schule zu emancipieren suchen und, wie ja auch die Meister dieser Schule sich bequemen müssen, sich von der Höhe der Zukunft etwas mehr in die Tiefe der Vergangenheit versenken. Sie spielte die Beethoven'sche Sonate Op. 81 , Variationen von Händel, Sarabande und Passepied von Bach interessant und gut, die Sachen von Liszt aber lieber und besser, und ein Salonstück von Tausig am besten.) On 27 February 1865, her father, who was also a member of the ADMV, (Note: Original Source (digital scan, p. 287, in the MDZ viewer): ... daß der Verein seit der Carlsruher Versammlung durch den Tod zwei Mitglieder (Musikalienhändler Topp und Pianofortefabrikant Steinweg in New-York) verloren habe.) died. (Note: Original German (digital scan, p. 145, in the MDZ viewer): In Stralsund starb der Musikalienhändler Topp am 27. Februar nach achtwöchentlichem Leiden.)

==== Court pianist in Löwenberg ====
In April 1866, Topp was appointed "chamber virtuoso and court pianist" by Constantine, Prince of Hohenzollern-Hechingen, at his residence in Löwenberg. (Note: Original German: Der Fürst zu Hohenzollern-Hechingen hat Fräulein Alide Topp aus München, eine Schülerin Bülow's, zu seiner Kammer-Virtuosin und Hof-Pianistin ernannt.) Prince Constantin was a prominent patron of the New German School, and organised concert series featuring his court orchestra under Max Seifriz. Topp "rapidly" became the "celebrated darling" of the public in Löwenberg. (Note: Original German (digital scan, p. 220, in the MDZ viewer): Löwenberg 12. Febr, .... Von den Concerten in letzter Zeit verdienen ganz besondere Erwähnung, außer den schon so oft gewürdigten herrlichen Leistungen der Hofkapelle unter Max Seifriz's genialer Leitung, die Solovorträge der Hofpianistin Fräulein Alide Topp ... Erstere, als eine Pianistin ersten Ranges in der Musikwelt bekannt, hat sich im Sturmschritt die Gunst des Publicums, dessen gefeierter Liebling sie seither geworden ist, erworben ...) As a representative of the New German School, she undertook further engagements, for example, in November 1866 in Schwerin, where she performed works by Liszt, Chopin and Handel "with a certain hardness in her touch", (Note: Original German (digital scan, p. 41, in the MDZ viewer): Chopin's Emollconcert und Stücke von Händel und Liszt wurden von Frl. Alide Topp ausgeführt, welche, eine gewisse Härte des Anschlags ausgenommen, durch eminente Technik und Beherrschung des Stoffes excellirte.) and appeared in Berlin in January 1867. On this occasion, the composer and critic Alexis Hollaender observed that while Topp made a generally "good impression" with Schumann's Faschingsschwank aus Wien, her style was characterised as "masculine, serious, and nobly virtuosic". Hollaender criticised her repertoire selection as "unfortunate", arguing that it primarily allowed her to showcase the "side of power" (Seite der Kraft) rather than a broader range of artistic expression. (Note: Original German (digital scan, p. 83, in the MDZ viewer): Frl. Topp befestigte den guten Eindruck durch ihr Spiel, das sich als ein männlich ernstes, edel virtuoses erwies; die Wahl des Faschingschwanks, so sehr sie sonst ihrer Künstlerschaft zur Ehre gereicht, war insofern nicht glücklich, daß ihr darin nur Gelegenheit gegeben war, sich vorzugsweise von Seite der Kraft zu zeigen.)

==== Departure for the United States Tour ====
After her stay in Löwenberg, Topp left Hamburg on board the steamer Saxonia, "first cabin", on 21 September and reached the Port of New York on 8 October 1867. German critics advised her to "behave modestly" because the New York public was "independent" and supposedly had no "trust in authority". (Note: Original German (digital scan, p. 999, in the MDZ viewer): Ausgabe Nr. 50 vom 29. November 1887: Die Pianistin Fräulein Alide Topp ist, wie bereits gemeldet wurde, in New York angekommen ... Das New Yorker Publicum sei ein sehr eigentümliches und selbstständiges, und ihm stehe der Autoritätsglaube ganz und gar. ... verlange es ein gewisses bescheidenes Auftreten selbst von Seiten der bedeutenderen Künstler ...)

At the time of her arrival, New York was experiencing a significant increase in the number of European immigrants. In the October 1867 issue of Signale für die musikalische Welt, the critic Theodor Hagen commented on this influx, focusing specifically on "these crowds of pianists", both men and women, "who arrived weekly" only to be "bitterly disappointed". However, he identified Topp as a notable exception who would likely "make her way" in the American musical scene. (Note: Original German (digital scan, p. 895, in the MDZ viewer): ... aber New York ist für alle diese Scharen von Pianisten und Pianistinnen, die wöchentlich bei uns einziehen, etwas zu klein. ... Natürlich nehme ich Künstlerinnen wie Fräulein Alide Topp, die soeben hier eingetroffen ist, aus, sie wird schon ihren Weg machen, aber für die große Mehrzahl der einwandernden Musiker dürfte der Aufenthalt in New York sehr arge Enttäuschungen mit sich bringen. New York, 25. Oct. 1867. Theodor Hagen.)

=== United States (1867–1870) ===
==== Arrival and early successes ====
Upon her arrival in New York, Topp visited the offices of Steinway & Sons. She presented William Steinway with a letter of recommendation from her former teacher, Hans von Bülow, in which she was described as superior to established pianists such as Clara Schumann, Wilhelmine Clauss-Szarvady, Mehlig, and Arabella Goddard. Bülow argued that her "artistic genius" justified classifying her not among "the female", but "male pianists", placing her on the same level as Anton Rubinstein and Tausig. Aware that her gender would be "an issue" in public discussion, Bülow sought to position Topp as a peer to the era's leading virtuosos. (Note: Quote from page 163: ... he realized her gender would be an issue with the public. He claimed that, although there were many 'excellent female pianists,' Topp was the best. 'The 'virtuose Qualität' which distinguishes her makes us regard her as a male,' Bülow wrote, 'rather than as a female pianist. The delicate, handsome woman has a technique, an energy, a fire, which enables her to enter the lists with a Rubinstein or a Tausig.' In essence, he complimented her by making her what Katharine Ellis has called an 'honorary man'.)

Topp's display of her skill at the piano after the delivery of the letter in the Steinway offices, during which parts of Liszt's Hungarian Rhapsodies were played, prompted the conductor Theodore Thomas to seek her engagement as a soloist. However, Topp's first public appearance in New York City took place on 3 November 1867 at the Liederkranz Hall, where she performed Liszt's Soirées de Vienne, Gnomenreigen, and Raff's Valse-étude, Op.56. This was followed on 14 November by a performance of Liszt's Piano Concerto No. 1 at Steinway Hall, conducted by Carl Bergmann, alongside Chopin's Ballade No. 1. Dwight's Journal of Music noted the "particular interest" shown by the public and praised her "excellent technique", as well as the "passion and soul" and "individuality" that marked her as a "true artist".

==== Established career ====
Following her New York debut, Topp became a fixture on the city's major concert stages. The journal Signale für die musikalische Welt dryly noted that her "bear-like friends" could no longer prevent her from making public appearances.

On 21 December 1867, Topp performed in the second season concert of the Philharmonic Society of New York at the Academy of Music. The program, conducted by Bergmann, drew significant interest as it featured the New York premiere of Liszt's Fantasy on Motifs from Beethoven's Ruins of Athens, alongside Weber's Konzertstück in F minor, Op. 79. While Dwight's Journal of Music noted that Topp performed "without a score", the New York Herald hailed her as a "great artist", who had found "her masterpiece" in her encore of Liszt's Hungarian Rhapsody and had done it "full justice". Her success continued on 8 January 1868 at Steinway Hall. Performing a program of Liszt's compositions, the New York Times praised her for possessing a "clear perception of the meaning of this sort of music".

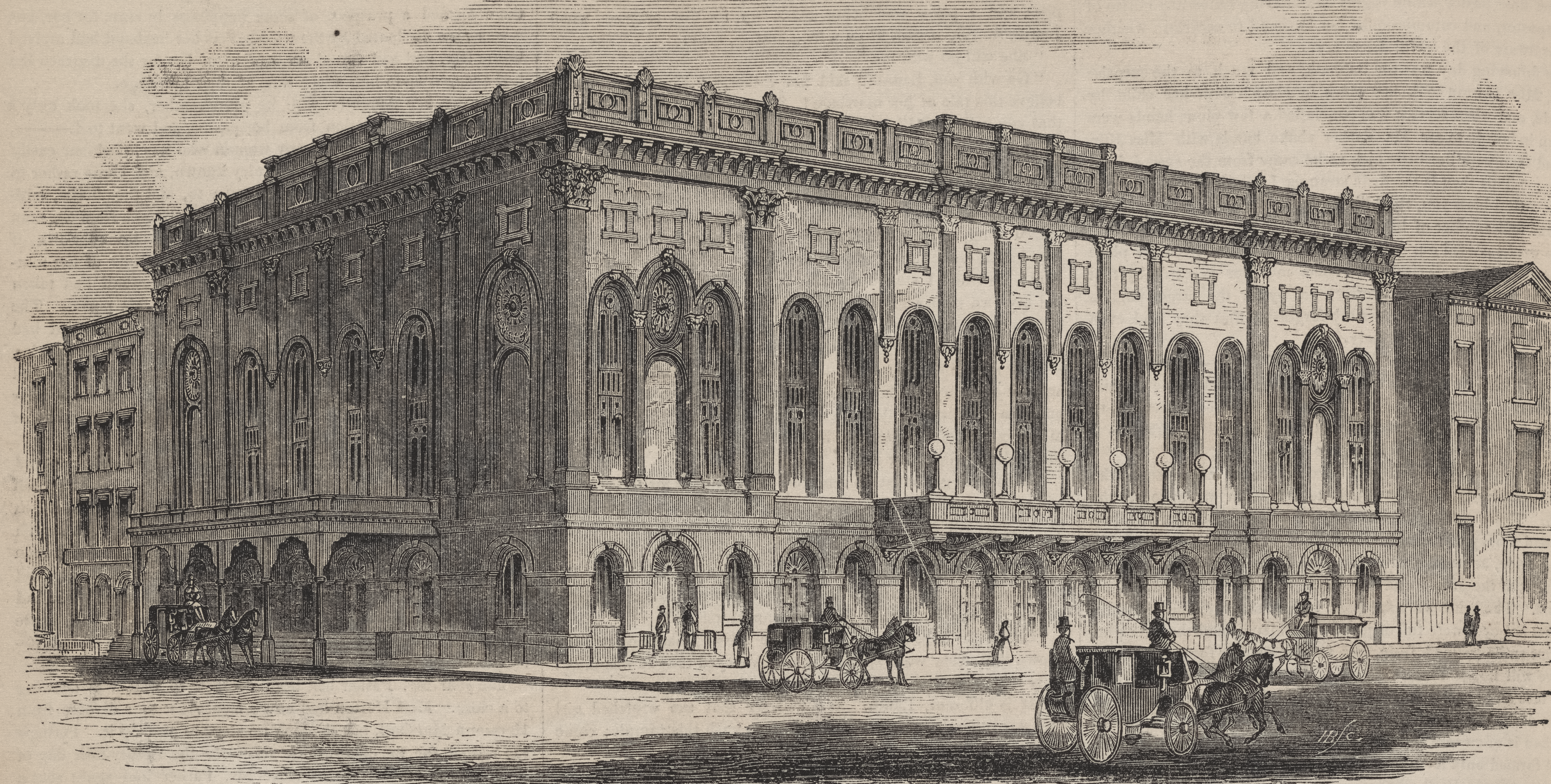
Academy of Music NYC in 1856, rebuilt in 1867.

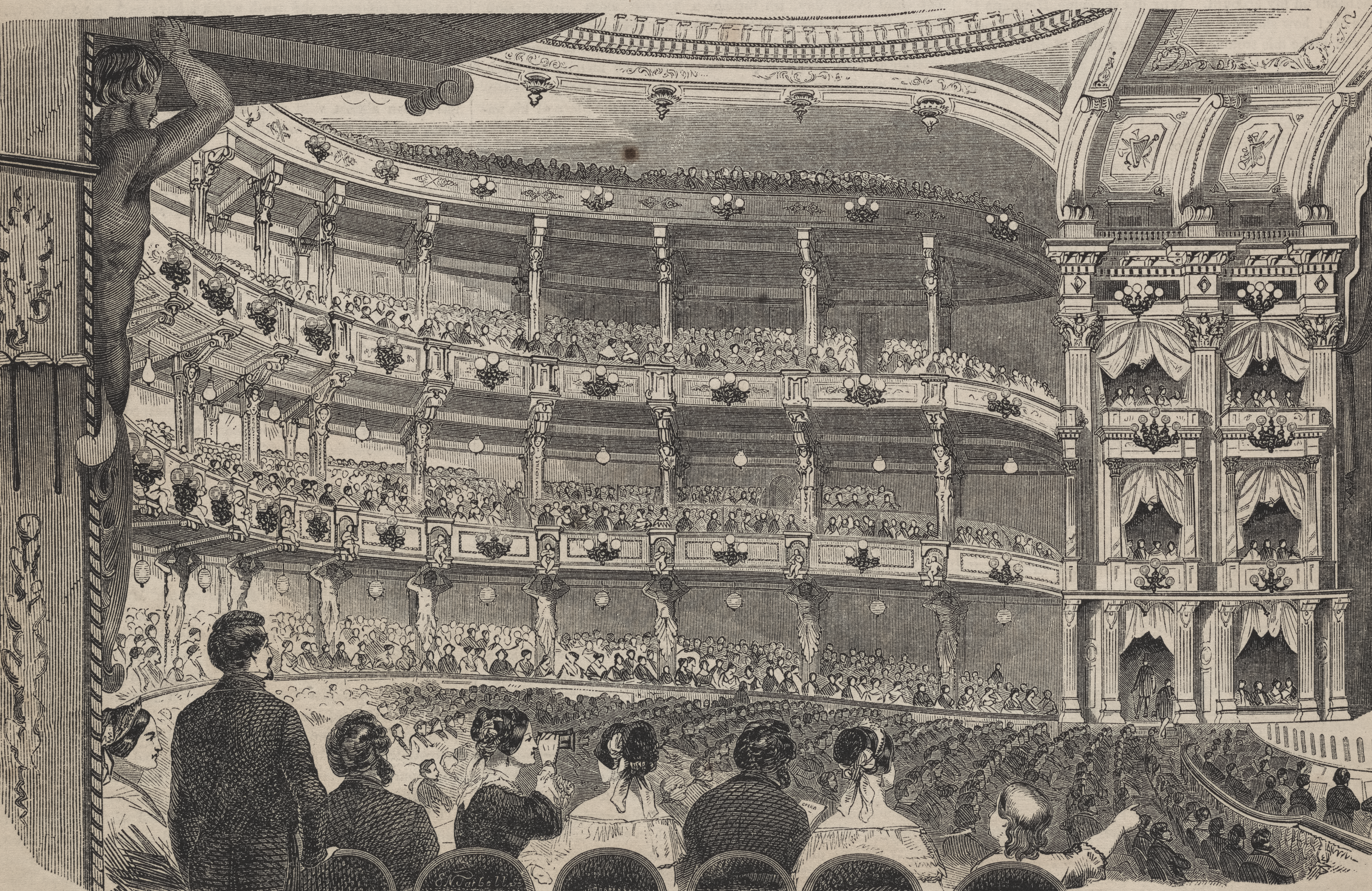
Auditorium in 1856, rebuilt in 1867.

At the end of January 1868, the press announced that Topp would be giving a series of solo recitals. These "historical concerts" were devoted to "characteristic compositions" by Bach, Beethoven, Haydn, Handel, Chopin, and Liszt. The New York Times – on the occasion of the first concert in this series on 6 February 1868, at Steinway Hall – remarked that presenting a program consisting solely of piano music was a "hazardous experiment" for the time, but concluded that Topp's reputation as a "fine artist" was by then "unquestionable".

Her success extended to Boston, where she performed at the Handel and Haydn Society's first Triennial Festival. She debuted on 6 May 1868 with Schumann's Piano Concerto, which a review noted "electrified" the audience. On 9 May, she presented Liszt's First Piano Concerto to the Boston public for the first time. John Sullivan Dwight described her playing as "brilliant and exquisite", despite his personal reservations regarding the "idiosyncratic" and "extravagant" composition. (Note: Source: Liszt´s Concerto in E-flat minor, No.1, for pianoforte and orchestra ... The first performance in Boston was by Alide Topp, at an afternoon concert in the first Triennial Festival of the Handel and Haydn Society. ... Miss Topp's first appearance in Boston was ... at an afternoon concert, 6 May, when she played Schumann's concerto. ... Yet she could not persuade Mr. Dwight by her performance that Liszt's concerto was worth while, "for anything more wilful, whimsical, outrée, far-fetched than this composition is, anything more incoherent, uninspiring, frosty to the finer instincts, we have hardly known under the name of music.") In August 1868, Topp spent several weeks in Newport, (Note: Newport ... Topp, the wonderful pianist, is spending a few weeks there, and besides receiving a great deal of attention in the fashionable world, has twice played in public. See,) giving concerts and continued to cause a "first-class sensation".

In September 1868, Topp opened a teaching practice in Steinway's New York premises; that same autumn, she began performing with the Clara Louise Kellogg troupe. Following a performance of Chopin's Piano Concerto No. 2 in Boston that November, Dwight's Journal of Music reported that she played "wonderfully", noting that her initial nervousness was "creditable to her musical feeling". (Note: Quote: The orchestra was hardly as happy in the accompaniment of Chopin's E-minor Concerto as in the purely orchestral pieces; short time for rehearsal was the only reason, but she played it wonderfully well; a little stiffly in the beginning, perhaps, from nervousness, creditable to her musical feeling; but that soon wore off.) By the end of 1868, Topp was financially secure enough to support her mother in Germany and was recognised in the year-end review of the German-language New-Yorker Musik-Zeitung as one of the few "very gifted" pianists of the season.

Towards the end of 1869, Topp appeared in New York less frequently, (Note: She has played very little in New York during the past season ... source, see) apart from assisting concerts with Kellogg and Ole Bull, and the reception became more mixed. Following a performance of Chopin's Scherzo No. 2 on 23 October 1869, Dwight's Journal of Music wrote that she "failed to achieve artistic success", specifically noting frequent missed notes. Other critics began to employ gendered commentary; after she performed Liszt's Piano Concerto No. 1 on 27 November, the New York Herald remarked that she "should not overtask her powers again by selecting such a Titanic work", while the New York Post suggested the concerto exhausted "her strength before she had finished". At a Liederkranz Society concert on 10 April 1870, the New York Times described her as being outshone by the "more refined" Mehlig, though Topp was praised for her bravura in interpretations of Raff's Cachucha and Kowalski's Ventre à terre.

Topp's standing among the European musical elite was reaffirmed in March 1869, when a correspondent for the New York Tribune reported from Rome on an amused remark by Liszt. Addressing the critics' debate over her training, Liszt stated: "She is a pupil of Von Bülow – or rather Von Bülow does not make pupils, he makes masters, and Alide Topp is one of them."

==== Professional recognition and departure ====
In early 1870, Topp's professional standing led to high-level social recognition. On 16 February 1870, she was received by President Ulysses S. Grant and First Lady Julia Grant in the Red Room of the White House, where she performed "Home! Sweet Home!" for the presidential couple.

Topp gave her farewell concert on 3 May 1870, at the Union League Theatre in New York City. The performance, attended by a "very select" audience, was introduced by Robert Ogden Doremus, then president of the New York Philharmonic. While Watson's Weekly Art Journal offered a mixed review, praising her "excellent pianism" in Liszt's works but questioning her professional advancement, other critics were more favourable. The Washington Chronicle argued that Topp had "created quite a sensation" in America, noting that her musical style skilfully "excels in the execution of difficult music", and her repertoire would challenge the "uneducated masses". The report expressed the hope that she would not forget that the general public was "not as well educated as herself in the divine art". Topp departed New York for Europe on 7 May 1870. (Note: Miss Alide Topp, the brilliant young pianist, sailed for Europe last Saturday. Source, see)

==== Reception and legacy in the United States ====
Topp's impact on American piano culture persisted long after her departure. In 1871, The Musical Independent recalled her as a performer for whom there were "no technical difficulties" and who possessed a strength in playing comparable to that of her male colleagues. An anecdote from the era illustrates the gender stereotypes Topp faced; when the violinist Ole Bull remarked that no woman could play "great music" due to the lack of "biceps of a man", Topp reportedly retorted: "I break my pianos as well as a man could, and Steinway has to send me a new one every week."

In his 1889 work A Hundred Years of Music in America, W. S. B. Mathews placed Topp within the piano culture established in the United States by Bülow and Rubinstein. He noted that conductor Thomas further developed this tradition by engaging prominent female soloists for his orchestral tours. Mathews considered Topp, alongside Mehlig and Krebs, as essential figures in this movement, stating that their names were "not to be forgotten in this connection". Topp was listed in the section "Prominent pianists and teachers who are or have been identified with the American pianoforte" in Daniel Spillane's 1890 book History of the American Pianoforte.

In his 2003 study From Paris to Peoria: How European Piano Virtuosos Brought Classical Music to the American Heartland, musicologist R. Allen Lott broadened this context, identifying Topp among the "very high caliber" pianists who toured "extensively throughout the United States" between 1867 and 1870 in the post-Civil War era. Lott suggested that these artists may have sought "greater acceptance than possible on the continent", contributing to the foundational era of American concert life. (Note: Quote: European women pianists had made their way to America since the 1850s, perhaps seeking greater acceptance than possible on the continent. Several of a very high caliber toured extensively throughout the United States shortly before Rubinstein's arrival, including Alide Topp, a pupil of Hans von Bülow (in U.S. 1867–70); Anna Mehlig (1846–1928; in U.S. 1869–73), who studied briefly with Liszt, and Marie Krebs (1851–1900; in U.S. 1870–72). All three performed frequently with orchestra and gave numerous solo recitals, then still a rarity, especially for a visiting performer.) As late as 1906, Topp was listed in an advertisement in the Washington Post among the "eminent musical artists" who prioritised the use of Steinway pianos.

== Return to Germany and private life ==
=== Marriage and family ===
Shortly before her departure in May 1870, Topp attended the christening of Doremus's child at his New York family residence, a social event covered by the Chicago Tribune, also to report on Topp's reasons for returning home and her "touching little romance" there: Prussian officers were only allowed to marry if the couple had sufficient private wealth to support a family – a financial requirement that Topp, according to the reporter, was able to meet using the proceeds from her American tour.

Topp returned to Germany two months before the outbreak of the Franco-Prussian War. Her engagement to Prussian lieutenant Franz August Gebhardt von Schöler – a member of the nobility – was announced in the military journal Militär-Wochenblatt issue of 15 March 1871. The couple married on 6 November 1871 in Oldenburg. They would go on to have three sons: Eugen (born 1873 in Stralsund), Edgar (born 1874 in Aurich), and Frank (born 1876 in Aurich).

=== Later life ===
In its 27 May 1870 issue, the Neue Zeitschrift für Musik mentioned Topp's return from the United States in the personal news section. After that, her name no longer appears in the German music press.

Alide von Schöler died on 7 July 1935 in Charlottenburg, then part of Greater Berlin. In the contemporary Berlin address book, she was listed under the title of "widowed lieutenant colonel", reflecting the social custom of the time.

== Bibliography ==
- "Alide Eleonore Auguste Sophie Topp in the Rhineland, Germany, Lutheran Baptisms, Marriages, and Burials, 1533–1950". Ancestry.com – via The Wikipedia Library. "Collection 61131, Record 900925105: Name: Alide Eleonore Auguste Sophie Topp, Marriage Age: 27, Event Type: Heirat (Marriage), Birth Date: 22 Apr 1844. Marriage Date: 06 Nov 1871 (6 Nov 1871), Marriage Place: Oldenburg, Preußen, ... Spouse: Franz August Gebhardt Von Schöler, Author: Evangelische Kirche. Militärgemeinde Toul (Meurthe-et-Moselle)"
- "Alide Topp: Liederkranz Musical Soiree: 1st". Brook Center (CUNY) Project Music in Gotham. 3 November 1867.
- "Alide Topp". The Evening Telegraph, Philadelphia: 6. 19 October 1867 – via Newspapers.com. "Last week a young lady of exceedingly prepossessing appearance found her way into the office of Messrs. Steinway & Sons, where she inquired for Mr. William Steinway, to whom she handed the subjoined enthusiastic letter of in-troduction, ... removing her gloves, began to prelude and modulate with exquisite elegance, dashing off suddenly into one of those eccentric Hungarian rhapsodies of Liszt's ... Mr. Theodore Thomas, after hearing her perform, at once provided for her debut at his first concert, October 26, with Liszt's Piano Con-certo and Orchestra."
- "Alide Topp in the Hamburg Passenger Lists, 1850–1934". Ancestry.com – via The Wikipedia Library. "Collection 1068, Record 5343548: Name: Alide Topp, Gender: weiblich (Female), Marital Status: ledig (Single), Departure Age: 21, Birth Date: abt 1846, Departure Date: 21 Sept 1867, Departure Place: Hamburg, Deutschland (Germany), Arrival place: New York, Ship Name: Saxonia ... Shipping Line: Hamburg-Amerikanische Packetfahrt-Actien-Gesellschaft, Ship Type: Dampfschiff, Ship Flag: Deutschland, Accommodation: Erste Kajüte"
- "Antoine Dessane Concert: 1st, 8 January 1868". Brook Center (CUNY) Project Music in Gotham. "From New York Times, 10 January 1868, p. 4: Miss Alide Topp played Liszt's arrangement of the Spinning Song from Wagner's opera of the 'Flying Dutchman' in a very creditable way. She is a good artiste, with a clear perception of the meaning of this sort of music."
- "Article on New York musical life, 1868". Brook Center (CUNY) Project Music in Gotham. "From New-Yorker Musik-Zeitung, 26 December 1868, p. 328: Some of the few very gifted and near being a virtuoso we heard this year, we mention Alide Topp, Oscar Pfeiffer, Mills, Carl Wolfsohn, Wenzel Kopta, and Ferdinand von Inten."
- "Berlin". Niederrheinische Musikzeitung für Kunstfreunde und Künstler (in German). 10: 407. 20 December 1862 – via MDZ – Bavarian State Library. Digital scan numbers in the MDZ viewer may differ from the original page numbers.
- Berliner Adreßbuch [Berlin address book] (in German). Vol. 2. August Scherl Verlag. 1931. p. 3051 – via Google Books – Deutsches Museum. "vrw. Oberstleutnant"
- "Berlin am 23. April". Neues Fremden-Blatt: 5. 29 April 1866 – via ANNO.
- "Berlin. Revue". Neue Berliner Musikzeitung (in German): 4. 3 April 1861 – via ANNO.
- "II Kürzere Nachrichten". Niederrheinische Musikzeitung für Kunstfreunde und Künstler (in German). 10. 1862 – via MDZ – Bavarian State Library. "Stralsund. Alide Topp. Pianistin." Digital scan numbers in the MDZ viewer may differ from the original page numbers.
- Boston Symphony Orchestra concert programs. Trip, Season 29. Vol. x–1910. Boston: Boston Symphony Orchestra – via Internet Archive – Boston Symphony Orchestra Archives.
- "Brevities". Hartford Courant: 2. 27 September 1868 – via Newspaper.com. "Miss Alide Topp continues to produce a first-class sensation at Newport."
- Davidsohn, Robert (2021). Fastenrath Vinattieri, Wiebke; Knäbich, Wolfram (eds.). Menschen, die ich kannte: Erinnerungen eines Achtzigjährigen [People I Knew: Memories of an Eighty-Year-Old]. Deutsche Geschichtsquellen des 19. und 20. Jahrhunderts. Berlin: Duncker & Humblot. ISBN 978-3-428-15716-7. JSTOR jj.22362079.9.
- "Deutscher Liederkranz Concert, 10 April 1870". Brook Center (CUNY) Project Music in Gotham. "From The New York Times, 11 April 1870, p. 5: Miss Alide Topp played Raff's cachucha and Kowalski's 'Ventre à Terre' with a brilliancy which Miss Mehlig, a more refined artist, but one much less likely to carry away an audience than her spirited rival, seems rather indifferent to."
- "Die Tonkünstler-Versammlung in Karlsruhe am 23.-25. August 1864" [The musicians' assembly in Karlsruhe on August 23–25, 1864.]. Niederrheinische Musik-Zeitung für Kunstfreunde und Künstler (in German). 12. Cologne: M. DuMont Schauberg: 308. 1864.
- "Dritte Versammlung der Deutschen Tonkünstler Karlsruhe, [21.] 23. – 26. August 1864" (PDF) (in German) – via dbt – Thuringian State and University Library (ThULB). "PDF, p. 2"
- Dwight, John Sullivan (1867–1868). Dwight's Journal of Music. Vol. 27–28 – via Internet Archive – The New York Public Library.
- "The Second Concert of the N. Y. Philharmonic Society took place on Saturday evening, Dec. 21st". Dwight's Journal of Music. 27 (21): 168. 4 January 1868 – via Internet Archive. "Miss Topp played without score."
- Einstein, Alfred (1918). "Pianisten". Zeitschrift für Musikwissenschaft (in German). 2. Leipzig: Breitkopf & Härtel: 717 – via Google Books – University of Wisconsin–Madison. "Alida Topp"
- "Familien-Nachrichten" [Family news]. Militär-Wochenblatt (56): 277. 15 March 1871 – via MDZ – Bavarian State Library. "Verlobungen: Frl. Alide Topp mit dem Pr. Lt. im Inf. Reg. Nr. 78 Hrn. v. Schoeler (Stralsund)" Digital scan numbers in the MDZ viewer may differ from the original page numbers.
- "Farewell concert of Miss Alide Topp". Watson's Weekly Art Journal. 12–13: 4 – via Google Books – New York Public Library. "Miss Topp, introduced to the audience by Dr. Ogden Doremus, played selections from Chopin, Raff, and Liszt. She has greatly improved in personal bearing, but we do not think she has made any advancement in her profession. ... This was excellent pianism, and deserved the hearty applause it received."
- "Foreign gossip". Chicago Tribune: 2. 27 December 1868 – via Newspaper.com. "Alide Topp, the pianist now giving concerts in the United States, has sent five thousand dollars and a very pretty letter to her aged mother, who lives in very humble circumstances in the Grand Duchy of Mecklenberg."
- Genealogisches Handbuch des Adels [Genealogical Handbook of the Nobility] (in German) (104 ed.). Limburg: C. A. Starke. 1993 – via Google Books. "Alide Topp, * Teterow, Meckl. – Schwerin, 22. 4. 1844, † Berlin – Charlottenburg 7. 7. 1935, Kammervirtuosin, Hofpianistin, T. d . Verlagsbuchhändlers Carl T. u . d . Dorothea ( Doris ) Hagemann."
- "Gottschalk". The Musical Independent. 3 (34). Chicago: Lyon & Healy: 116. 1871 – via Google Books – New York Public Library. "But how many admirable players there have been, and among the best of the more recent Alide Topp, Miss Mehlig, and Miss Krebs, who seemed to have conquered every mechanical difficulty, and not to lack the power of men in playing."
- "Historical Soirée of Classical and Modern Piano Music, 6 February 1868". Brook Center (CUNY) Project Music in Gotham. "From The New York Times, 10 February 1868, p. 5: Miss Alide Topp ventured on the hazardous experiment of giving on Thursday evening last a concert of piano music alone. ... The lady opened with Beethoven's 'Sonate Appassionata,' which she played coldly and with no sort of feeling, but with considerable power and technical skill. The last movement was singularly tame and inanimate. The same remarks apply to the greater portion of the 'Faschingschwank' by Schumann, a very interesting and difficult composition. Handel's aria and variations in D minor, and Bach's Sorrabande [sic] and Passepied were beautifully played. In such pieces skill rather than feeling is required, and Topp's skill is unquestionable. The 'Berceuse' of Chopin, and 'La Campanella,' by Liszt, although taken slower than usual, were charmingly rendered. Miss Topp is a fine artist. Not the least remarkable characteristic about her is the grasp and retentiveness of her memory. She plays everything without notes, from a concerto to a waltz."
- History of the Handel and Haydn Society, from the Foundation of the Society 1815 to 25 May 25 1903. Boston: A. Mudge & Son, printers. 1893. p. 271 – via Internet Archive – University of Wisconsin - Madison. "Her performance of Schumann's extremely difficult, as well as finely poetic and original concerto was wonderful. ... The interpretation of the work was intelligent and highly satisfactory; Schumann seemed speaking for himself. The public were electrified."
- Janecki, Marcelli (1893). "von Schöler". Handbuch des preussischen Adels (in German). Hamburg: E.S. Mittler & Sohn: 534. "(2) † Franz Ludwig Richard August Wilhelm Gebhard, geb. zu Neuwied a. Rh. 16. Dezember 1842, † zu Berlin 6. Juli 1892, Oberstlieutenant z. D. und Kommandeur des Landwehrbezirks Bernau, verm. zu Stralsund 6. November 1871 mit Alide Eleonore Sofie Topp, geb. zu Teterow in Mecklenburg-Schwerin 22. April 1846. [Berlin.] Söhne: a. Egon Friedrich Richard Heinrich Ludwig Konstantin, geb. zu Stralsund 24. August 1873, Sekondlieutenant im Anhalt. Infanterie-Regiment Nr. 93. [Dessau.] b. Edgar August Franz Karl Ernst Wilhelm, geb. zu Aurich 21. November 1874. c. Frank Karl Emil Paul, geb. zu Aurich 2. April 1876, Kadet zu Groß-Lichterfelde."
- Johnson, Harold Earle (1979). First performances in America to 1900: works with orchestra. Detroit: College Music Society. p. 217. ISBN 978-0-911772-94-4 – via Internet Archive. "Fantasia on Beethoven's Ruin of Athens, op. 25 (orchestrated by Liszt), New York, ... 21 Dec 1867, Philharmonic Society, Carl Bergmann, Alide Topp, piano"
- "Kleine Zeitung, Stralsund". Neue Zeitung für Musik (in German). Vol. 58–59. 1863. p. 144 – via University of Minnesota. "Da hat aber bei uns eine junge Pianistin concertiert und es verstanden, nicht nur das gewöhnliche Concertpublicum, sondern auch die Kunstkennerschaft, die Collegen mit eingeschlossen, durch ihre Leistungen für sich zu enthusiasmiren. Wirklich ein seltener Erfolg, wenn man bedenkt, daß der Vater der Künstlerin hier im Orte seit einer Reihe von Jahren ansässig ist, letztere also nicht einmal den Vortheil, weit her zu sein, für sich hat ... H. v. Bülow, Mazurka-Impromptu, Op. 4"
- "Le Festival de Carlsruhe". L'Illustration de Bade (in French): 116. 16 September 1864 – via Gallica.
- Liszt, Franz (1893). Franz Liszt's Briefe: Von Rom bis an's Ende [Franz Liszt's Letters: From Rome to the End] (in German). Vol. 2. Leipzig: Breitkopf & Härtel.
- "Liszt in his Monastery. His Tribute to Alide Topp". Chicago Evening Post: 2. 4 March 1869 – via Newspaper.com. "We spoke of Alide Topp. Liszt laughed heartily, when I told him that she had said to a friend in America: 'When I leave Liszt. I shall belong to the Devil.' He said that he had prophesied for her a noble career, when he had listened to her wonderful playing as a little girl, adding, 'She is a pupil of Von Bulow – or rather Von Bulow does not make pupils, he makes masters and Alide Topp is one.'"
- Lott, R. Allen (27 February 2003). "Interlude II. (Abstract): From Paris to Peoria: How European Piano Virtuosos Brought Classical Music to the American Heartland". Oxford Academic – Oxford University Press. pp. 161–168. doi:10.1093/acprof:oso/9780195148831.003.0012. "Partly because of the Civil War, no outstanding European pianist visited the United States during the 1860s. Several of a very high caliber toured extensively throughout the United States shortly before Rubinstein's arrival, including Alide Topp (in the US 1867–70), Anna Mehlig (1846–1928; in the US 1869–73), and Marie Krebs (1851–1900; in the US 1870-2)."
- Lott, R. Allen (2003). From Paris to Peoria: how European piano virtuosos brought classical music to the American heartland. Oxford, New York: Oxford University Press. ISBN 978-0-19-534889-7 – via Google Books.
- "Männergesangverein Arion Concert, 14 November 1867". Brook Center (CUNY) Project Music in Gotham. "From Dwight's Journal of Music, 24 November 1867, p. 144: Unusual interest was felt in the first appearance of the young pianist, Mlle. Topp, who played Liszt's concert in an admirable manner. Her technics [sic] are superb, but what is still better, she has fire and soul. There is individuality in her performance, which stamps her at once as a true artist. She made deservedly a favorable impression."
- Mathews, William Smythe Babcock (1889). A Hundred Years of Music in America: An Account of Musical Effort in America. Chicago: G.L. Howe. p. 115. "It was not in Bulow's art to awaken so great enthusiasm as Rubinstein, but his work was of great value ... The American standard henceforth formed itself a sort of resultant of the work of these two great masters. A distinct advance in the popular apprehension of the art of piano playing was assisted by Mr. Theodore Thomas, who in his concert tours of 1870–74 carried with him pianists, introducing three ladies, each of a high order of accomplishment. ... The ladies, whose names are not to be forgotten in this connection, were Anna Mehlig, a graduate of the Stuttgart Conservatory, Alide Topp and Marie Krebs."
- McClure, James Baird (1879). Entertaining Anecdotes from Every Available Source. Chicago, Illinois: Rhodes & McClure. p. 97 – via Google Books. "Ole Bull, Camille Urso, and Miss Alida Topp met once at a party. "You play beautifully, my child," said the Norwegian to Miss Topp, "but you can't do the great music. No woman can; it takes the biceps of a man." "My arm is strong enough," answered the brilliant young pianist, laughing; I break my pianos as well as a man could, and Steinway has to send me a new one every week."
- "Miss Topp". The Musical World. 46 (18): 300. 2 May 1868 – via Internet Archive – Open Court Publishing Co. "Miss Topp however, comes with credentials ... from Herr von Bülow, Abbé Liszt's actual son-in-law. Thus writes ... to Messrs. Steinway, the Erards of New York: "Miss Alide Topp ... Excellent female pianists as we have in the musical world (Schumann, Clauss, Mehlig, Goddard, & c.), Miss Topp beats them all. ... her as a male, rather than a female pianist. The delicate, handsome woman has a technique, an energy, a fire, which enable her to enter the lists with a Rubinstein or a Tausig."
- "Miss Alide Topp's historical concerts". New York Tribune: 5. 27 January 1868 – via Library of Congress. "In these concerts it is her intention, without the aid of any other performer, to render some of the characteristic compositions of Bach, Beethoven, Haydn, Handel, Chopin, Liszt, and other eminent masters, with a view to the illustration of their peculiar styles and the expression of the spirit of their works in a manner to interest a cultivated audience."
- "Music". The Independent, New York City: 2. 12 May 1870 – via Newspaper.com.
- "Musical and Fashionable Gossip". Chicago Tribune: 6. 15 May 1870 – via Newspapers.com. "Miss Alide Topp ... A touching little romance connected with her visit to the United States is not, I imagine, generally known. Among the laws that govern the Kingdom of Prussia is one ... that forbids a Prussian army officer to marry, unless he or his fiancée has a fortune, the income of which will furnish ample support for a family, independent of his pay. Miss Topp and her marital lover were in precisely the predicament that made marriage an impossibility; so, with all a woman's devotion and self-sacrifice, the tour through the United States was made, and the faithful inamorata goes back to endow, it is to be hoped, her equally faithful lover with the fruit of her toil and triumphs."
- "Musical Items". The Evening Telegraph: 5. 21 October 1868 – via Newspaper.com. "Miss Kellogg appeared, for the first time since her return from Europe, at the Academy of Music, New York, on Monday night ... She was assisted on Monday evening by Miss Alide Topp, M. Casar Alard, Signor Lotti, and Signor Susini. The orchestra was under the direction of Carl Bergmann and Signor Giorza."
- National Archives and Records Administration. "New York, U.S., Arriving Passenger and Crew Lists (including Castle Garden and Ellis Island), 1820–1957". Ancestry.com – via The Wikipedia Library. "Collection 7488, Record 6785351: Name: Alide Tapp, Gender: Female, Ethnicity/ Nationality: German, Age: 21, Birth Date: abt 1846, Place of Origin: Germany, Departure Port: Hamburg, Germany and Southampton, England, Destination: USA, Arrival Date: 8 Oct 1867, Arrival Port: New York, New York, USA, Ship Name: Saxonia"
- "Neue Zeitschrift für Musik. 66. 1871". Neue Zeitschrift für Musik (in German). 66. 1871 – via MDZ – Bavarian State Library. "Ausgabe Nr. 22 vom 27. Mai 1870: Die Pianistin Alide Topp ist aus Newyork nаch Deutschland zurückgekehrt ..." Digital scan numbers in the MDZ viewer may differ from the original page numbers.
- "Neue Zeitschrift für Musik. 60. 1864". Neue Zeitschrift für Musik (in German). 60. 1864 – via MDZ – Bavarian State Library. Digital scan numbers in the MDZ viewer may differ from the original page numbers.
- "Neue Zeitschrift für Musik. 63. 1867". Neue Zeitschrift für Musik (in German). 63. 1867 – via MDZ – Bavarian State Library. Digital scan numbers in the MDZ viewer may differ from the original page numbers.
- "Neue Zeitschrift für Musik. 62. 1866". Neue Zeitschrift für Musik (in German). 62. 1866 – via MDZ – Bavarian State Library. Digital scan numbers in the MDZ viewer may differ from the original page numbers.
- "Neue Zeitschrift für Musik. 61. 1865". Neue Zeitschrift für Musik (in German). 61. 1865 – via MDZ – Bavarian State Library. Digital scan numbers in the MDZ viewer may differ from the original page numbers.
- "Philharmonic Society of New York Concert: 1st, 27 November 1869". Brook Center (CUNY) Project Music in Gotham. "From the New York Post, 28 November 1869, p. 4: Miss Alide Topp played Liszt's difficult concerto entirely from memory. In many of the passages she revealed her best qualities as a pianist, but the arduous character of the selection told upon her strength before she had finished; yet the performance was notable and interesting."
- "Philharmonic Society of New York Concert: 1st, 27 November 1869". Brook Center (CUNY) Project Music in Gotham. "From New York Herald, 28 November 1869, p. 7: Still Miss Topp played admirably and deserved the applause which greeted her, but she should not overtask her powers again by selecting such a Titanic work."
- "Philharmonic Society of New York Concert: 2nd, 21 December 1867". Brook Center (CUNY) Project Music in Gotham. "From New York Herald, 22 December 1867, p. 3: Miss Alida Topp proved herself the great artiste we have always deemed her, and in the Liszt fantasia, a bizarre, wonderful work in which the 'March and Chorus of Dervishes" of Beethoven are worked up in a truly original manner, she brought an enthusiastic encore, to which she responded by playing the 'Rhapsodie Hongroise No. 2' by Liszt. This seems to be her pièce de resistance, and she did it full justice. We did not like her rendering of the 'Concertstück,' in either conception of the composer's ideas or in the tempo, which was entirely too slow."
- "Pianistin Fräulein Alide Topp". Signale für die musikalische Welt (in German): 10. 1868 – via Google Books – Harvard University. "Fräulein Topp, die vor kurzer Zeit hier mit den wärmsten Empfehlungen angekommene und durch bärenhafte Freunde leider zu lange am öffentlichen Auftreten verhinderte junge Pianistin, trat im Concert des „Arion" zum ersten Male vor ein größeres Publicum ..."
- "Pianoforte". The New York Herald: 2. 22 September 1868 – via Newspaper.com. "Miss Alide Topp, court pianiste of the Prince of Hohenzollern Hechingen and pupil of Dr. Hans von Buelow, is prepared to give instruction in the art of Piano playing to a limited number of pupils, and also to give finishing lessons to those who are already far advanced and wish to become concert players. Persons desirous of engaging Miss Topp's services will please address her, care Steinway & Sons, 109 and 111 East Fourteenth Street."
- "Public Amusements: Miss Topp's concert". Washington Chronicle: 1. 9 February 1870 – via Newspaper.com. "Miss Alide Topp has made for herself many friends in Washington, having previously appeared in Miss Kellogg's and Ole Bull's concert."
- "Public Amusements: Farewell concert". Washington Chronicle: 4. 15 February 1870 – via Newspaper.com. "The farewell concert of Miss at Lincoln Hall last evening was not very largely attended. She is certainly one of the most skilful and finished of performers on the piano, and excels in the execution of difficult music. ... the pieces selected are far beyond the comprehension of the uneducated masses, and can only be really enjoyed by those who are performers themselves, or have spent years in studying and mastering the science of music. ... She has created quite a sensation since she came to America, and ... to forget that the people generally are not as well educated as herself in the divine art ..."
- "Re-opening of Liederkranz Hall, 23 October 1869". Brook Center (CUNY) Project Music in Gotham. "From Dwight's Journal of Music, 6 November 1869, p. 133: I regret to say that Miss Topp did justice neither to herself nor to the magnificent Scherzo; she missed notes quite frequently and altogether failed to achieve an artistic success."
- "Rostock". Allgemeine musikalische Zeitung (in German): 6–7. 1 March 1865 – via ANNO.
- "Signale für die musikalische Welt. 25 (1867)". Signale für die musikalische Welt (in German). 25. 1867 – via MDZ – Bavarian State Library. Digital scan numbers in the MDZ viewer may differ from the original page numbers.
- Spillane, Daniel (1890). History of the American Pianoforte: Its Technical Development, and the Trade. New York: D. Spillane. p. 363 – via Google Books. "Appendix A. Prominent pianists and teachers who are or have been identified with the American pianoforte. ... Alida Topp"
- "Steinway". Washington Post: 2. 24 March 1906 – via Newspaper.com. "Here is a list of some of the eminent musical artists who have used and prefer to use Steinway & Sons' pianofortes, and have addressed complimentary letters to Messrs. Steinway, which they value as honorary distinctions ... Topp, Miss Alida, Germany"
- Svejda, George J. (2 December 1868). "Castle Garden as an Immigrant Depot, 1855–1890" (PDF). www.npshistory.com. Washington, D.C: U.S. Dept. of the Interior, Division of History, Office of Archeology and Historic Preservation. p. 89. "PDF, p. 95: The immigrants who passed the doors of Castle Garden in 1864 numbered 180,296, while in 1867, the immigrants processed there reached a total of 242,731."
- von Bülow, Hans (1898). Briefe und Schriften: Briefe, 1855–1864 [Letters and writings: Letters, 1855–1864 (3)] (in German). Vol. 3. Leipzig: Breitkopf & Härtel – via Google Play Books.
- "Washington facts and impressions". National Republican: 1. 17 February 1870 – via Library of Congress. "Yesterday afternoon, after business hours, Mrs. Benator Sprague, in company with Miss Allde Topp, the celebrated pianist, called at the Excite Mansion, and they were cordially received by the President and Mrs. Grant, in the red room, where the members of the President's family, Generals Peter and Babcock, were assembled. An hour was agreeably spent in conversation, interspersed with music by Miss Topp, who performed, among other places, 'Sweet Home'. Both the President and his lady complimented the execution and expressed themselves as highly appreciating the enjoyment afforded."
- Walker, Alan (1997). Franz Liszt. 3: The final years, 1861 – 1886. Ithaca, NY: Cornell University Press. p. 71. ISBN 978-0-8014-8453-7 – via Google Books.
- Walton, Chris (2009). "Some Day My Fürst Will Come: Wagner's Hohenzollern Hopes for a Prussian Bayreuth". The Musical Times. 150 (1907): 10. ISSN 0027-4666. JSTOR 25597619. "Constantin was both a supporter of the New German School, and prepared to devote a large proportion of his annual income to music. In his purpose-built concert hall, he even granted free concert admission to the common citizens of the region, ..."
- "Yesterday afternoon". National Republican: 1. 17 February 1870 – via Newspapers.com. "... after business hours, Mrs. Senator Sprague, in company with Miss Alide Topp, the celebrated pianist, called at the Executive Mansion, and they were cordially received by the President and Mrs. Grant, in the red room, where the members of the President's family, Generals Perter and Babcock, were assembled. An hour was agreeably spent in conversation, interspersed with music by Miss Topp, who performed, among other pieces, "Sweet Home." Both the President and his lady complimented her execution and expressed themselves as highly appreciative of the enjoyment afforded."

== External sources and further readings ==
- "Alide Eleonore Auguste Sophie Topp in Germany, Lutheran Baptisms, Marriages, and Burials, 1500–1871". Ancestry.com – via The Wikipedia Library. "Collection 61229, Record 9832390: Name: Alide Eleonore Auguste Sophie Topp, Event Type: Taufe (Baptism), Birth Date: 22 Apr 1844, Baptism Date: 17 Mai 1844 (17 May 1844), Baptism Place: Teterow, Mecklenburg, Deutschland (Germany), Father: Carl Friederich Christoph Topp, Mother: Dorothea Sophia Friederica Topp"
- Brook Center (CUNY) Project Music in Gotham: chronological list of Alide Topp's 31 concerts during her stay in the United States, including the corresponding full-text music reviews; see "Alide Topp in Music in Gotham: The New York Scene 1862 – 1875". Project Music in Gotham. "Last Updated: 7 March 2018"
- Hoffmann, Freia (2012). "Europäische Instrumentalistinnen des 18. und 19. Jahrhunderts: Topp, Alide (Eleonore Sophie), Alida, verh. von Schoeler" [European women instrumentalists of the 18th and 19th centuries: Topp, Alide (Eleonore Sophie), Alida, married name von Schoeler]. www.sophie-drinker-institut.de.
- Tarnowski, Władysław (23 April 1868). Deux pièces: pour piano: composées et dediées à Mademoiselle Alide Topp: Au bord de la mer, Valse poème [Two pieces for piano, composed and dedicated to Mademoiselle Alide Topp: By the Sea, Poem Waltz]. Leipzig: C. F. Kahnt – via Internet Archive – Biblioteka Jagiellońska. "Note: In Western Europe, Tarnowski often used the French transliteration of his first name, Ladislas, or his pseudonym Ernest Buława"
