= Belisa =

Belisa may refer to:

== Literary characters ==
- Belisa in the play El acero de Madrid by Félix Lope de Vega 1608
  - es:Los melindres de Belisa, Félix Lope de Vega 1608
  - es:Las bizarrías de Belisa, Félix Lope de Vega 1634
- The Love of Don Perlimplín and Belisa in the Garden, play by Lorca
- Belisa, opera by Miguel Ángel Coria 1922, one of at least six operas based on Lorca's play
- Belisa (Olsen), 1966 Danish opera by Poul Rovsing Olsen

== People ==
- Belisa Vranich (1966) American author and founder of The Breathing Class (TM)
