= Poul Rovsing Olsen =

Danish composer and ethnomusicologist (1922–1982)

Poul Rovsing Olsen (November 4, 1922 – July 2, 1982) was a Danish composer and ethnomusicologist.

Olsen was born in Copenhagen. He studied with Knud Jeppesen at the Copenhagen Conservatory (1943-6) and with Nadia Boulanger and Olivier Messiaen in Paris (1948-9), then worked in Copenhagen as a music critic. His early works showed the influences of Bela Bartók, Igor Stravinsky and Carl Nielsen, joined in the 1950s by 12-note serialism, but from the 1960s his music began to reflect his work as a musical ethnologist (A L′inconnu for voice and 13 instruments, 1962): he did fieldwork in Greenland and the Persian Gulf and taught at the universities of Lund (1967-9) and Copenhagen (from 1969). His output includes opera, orchestral and chamber music, piano pieces and songs.

His opera Belisa is based on The Love of Don Perlimplín and Belisa in the Garden by Federico García Lorca.

== Compositions ==
Piano:

- Piano Sonata No. 1 (1950)
- Piano Sonata No. 2 (1952)

Orchestral:

- Variations Symphoniques, Op. 27 (1953)
- Piano Concerto, Op. 31 (1954)
- Sinfonia (1958)
- Au fond de la nuit, Op. 61
- Lux coelestis (1978)

Operas:

- Belisa, premiered at the Royal Opera in Copenhagen in 1966 and recorded by Dacapo Records in 2003.
- Usher, 1980
- Collected songs (1941-81) for voice and piano, edited Ulrik Cold, Christen Stubbe Teglbjærg - 1999

To Lagerkvistsange (Two Lagerkvist Songs), Op.15 (1949)
Two Prophetic Songs, Op.16 (1950)
Lyse sange (Light Songs), Op.19 (1951)
To tyske sange (Two German Songs), Op.36 (1955)
Smâ sange (Little Songs), Op.37 (1941)
Tre danske sange (3 Danish Songs), Op.39 (1957)
Deux Melodies, Op.84 (1981)

== Ethno-musicology ==
His major contributions to ethnomusicology included his pioneering work in the music of the Persian Gulf, especially Bahrain. Also his concern with "authors' rights", being a jurist himself, besides the fact that he also was a pianist and a composer. He considered traditional music as a heritage connected though to the persons who performed it therefore always stated the names of performers as he understood that most music of the Middle East was performed with a certain freedom by the performers, and that a good amount of it was created by the performer in what is usually called improvisation, knowing very well that these improvisations were "moments of impromptus compositions" that gave added-value to the original, traditional work. Olsen (or P.R.O. as his name's initials came to symbolize his name) introduced the names of famous performers from Arab States of the Persian Gulf, such as Salem el'Allan, Ahmad Bou Tabanja, Al-'Amiri among others, and Lebanese singer Dunya Yunis, whose tape singing Abu Zeluf was published on the Tangent 2LP set 'The Human Voice in the World of Islam' which Olsen published with another musicologist Jean Jenkins. (Yunis was sampled in Brian Eno's My Life in the Bush of Ghosts.) Olsen's invitation of Arab-Luth (`Oud) player Munir Bashir to a music festival in Denmark in the early 1970s, brought this instrumentalist together with an Indian performer where they played duos in a hybrid style. This exquisite and new style brought Bashir into fame all over the Arab world and in many European countries.

He also specialised in the traditional music of Greenland.

=== Publications ===
- An aulos in the Danish National Museum 1969
- Musiketnologi Serie: Berlingske leksikonbibliotek; n.89 1974
- Acculturation in the Eskimo songs of the Greenlanders 1975
- Compte rendu d'un voyage au Moyen-Orient 1976
- Music and musical instruments in the world of Islam Jean L. Jenkins, Poul Rovsing Olsen, Horniman Museum - 1976
- Dagbogsblade fra indsamlingsrejse til Angmagssalik 1977
- Music in Bahrain: traditional music of the Arabian Gulf Volume 1 reissued 2002
