= Demetrio (Metastasio) =

Opera libretto by Pietro Metastasio

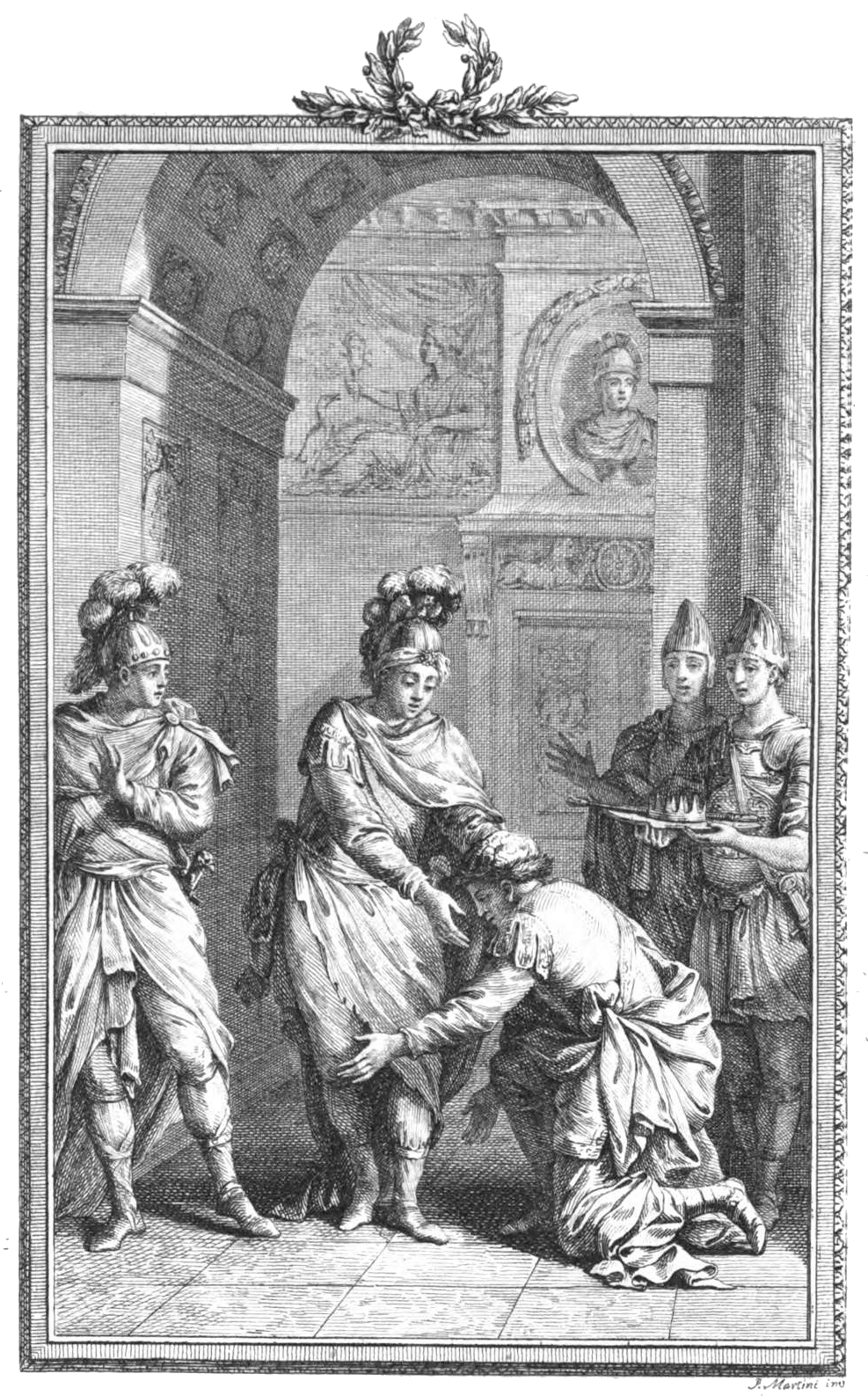
Metastasio - Demetrio - Herissant Vol.01 - Paris 1780

Demetrio is an opera libretto in three acts by Pietro Metastasio. It was first performed to music composed by Antonio Caldara on 4 November 1731 during celebrations of the name day of the Holy Roman Emperor Charles VI in Vienna. Different composers later used it when composing operas named Alceste, Cleonice and Demetrio, rè della Siria. With over fifty settings it was one of Metastasio's most popular works.

== Action ==
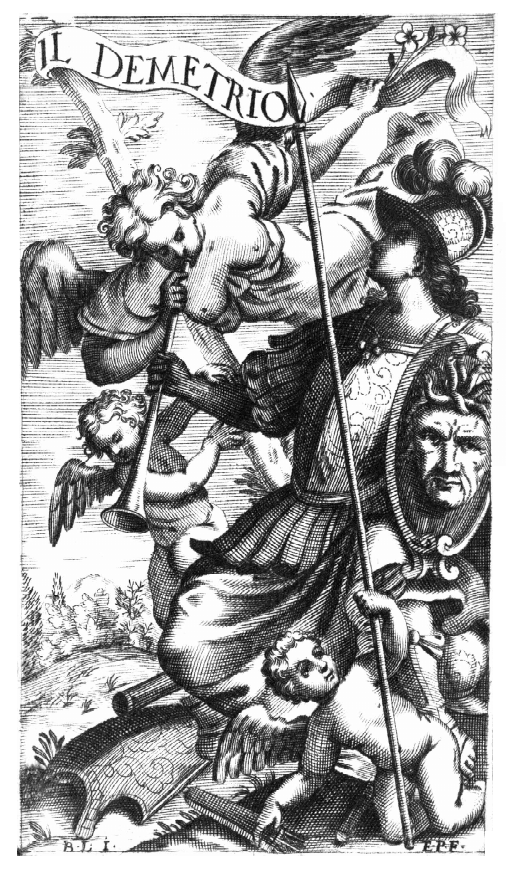
Image from the libretto, music by Johann Adolph Hasse, Venice 1737

The opera is about the seizure of power by the Seleucid king Demetrius II Nicator after his return from exile. The action takes place in Seleucia. The roles in the opera are:

- Cleonice, Queen of Syria, lover of Alceste
- Alceste, later revealed to be king Demetrio
- Barsene, confidant of Cleonice, secretly in love with Alceste
- Fenicio, councillor, guardian of Alcestes and father of Olinto
- Olinto, councillor, rival of Alceste
- Mitrane, captain of the guard and friend of Fenicio

The following plot summary is based on the 1734 libretto used in the Brunswick version by Antonio Caldara. (Note: Italian/German libretto of the setting by Antonio Caldara, Wolffenbüttel 1734 at the Herzog August Library.)

=== Act 1 ===
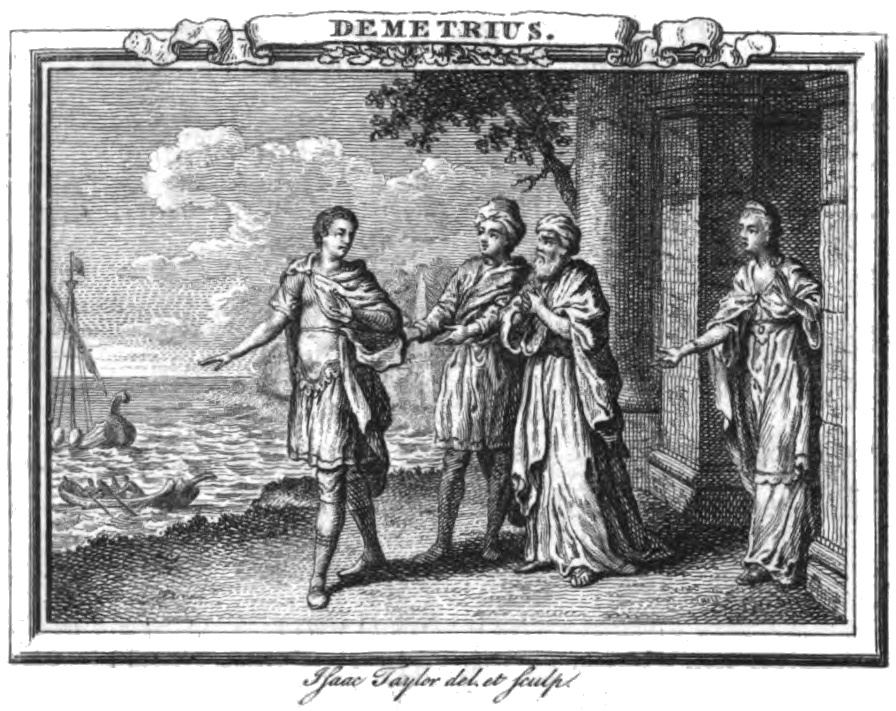
Image from the text edition, London 1767

Private room: Cleonice has ruled Syria since her father Alexander died in battle: her people expect her to choose a husband who will become the new king. Her councillor Olinto offers himself, but she rejects him as she loves the shepherd Alceste who has also been missing since the battle. Barsene advises her that even if he is still alive she cannot marry him as there are many more deserving suitors. Mitrane arrives and warns that the people are close to starting an uprising. Mitrane loves Barsene, who rejects him as she is secretly also in love with Alceste. Fenicio tells Mitrane that Prince Demetrio, son of the previous king Demetrio, is still alive, although thought to be dead, and is none other than his foster son Alceste. External help is needed to place him on the throne, and Fenicio's plan is to marry him to Cleonice. Unfortunately Alceste cannot be found and Cleonice has to choose another husband.

Magnificent hall with a throne: Cleonice enters, and still has not made up her mind. Fenicio advises her to give herself another three months to think about it. They are interrupted by Mitranes, who reports the arrival of Alceste. Alceste now recounts where he has been: After Alexander lost the battle, almost his entire army was destroyed. He himself survived badly wounded and drifted in the water until he was rescued by a fisherman who took good care of him.

Olinto presses for a new king to be chosen, and tries to prevent Alceste from joining them, as he is a mere shepherd. Cleonice responds by appointing him general and keeper of the grand seal. Before Cleonice announces her choice, she extracts an oath from those present that they will accept their choice. Since Olinto refuses, Cleonice declares that she wants to give up her crown and leaves without announcing her choice. Mitrane, the nobles and the people also leave the room. Fenicio, Olinto and Alceste remain. Fenicio blames his son. Olinto is disappointed that he doesn't support him, but Fenicio doesn't think he would be a good king. Olinto recognizes a dangerous rival in Alceste despite his poor background.

Inner garden of the royal palace: Fenicio reports to Cleonice and Barsene that the council has refused to accept Cleonice's abdication. Everyone agrees to let her choose her spouse completely freely. Cleonice is not sure however, fearing both to risk putting a shepherd on the throne and losing Alceste if she does not. Alceste arrives and assures her of his love. Concerned that she has placed her personal feelings before her duty, Cleonice dismisses him. When Alceste asks Barsene why Cleonice's behavior has changed, she advises him to find another mistress.

=== Act 2 ===
A gallery leading to the Queen's chamber: Olinto denies Alceste access to Cleonice and Mitrane confirms that the order comes from Cleonice herself. Alceste leaves disappointed. Olinto still hopes for the throne. Mitrane, however, advises him against it. After Olinto leaves, Cleonice and Barsene arrive. Cleonice writes a farewell letter to Alceste. Fenicio comes and asks Cleonice for pity on Alceste, who only wants to see her again once and then die. She tears up the letter and wants to let Alceste come. However Olinto has already ordered Alceste in Cleonice's name to leave the city, and he has left. Cleonice orders the guard to have Alceste found and brought back. Olinto asks Barsene if she still loves him. She answers mockingly that he has already given up on her. She herself also saved her love for someone else. Olinto is determined not to be dissuaded from his goal.

One of the queen's rooms: Alceste has returned and Cleonice explains her rejection - they must part for the good of the people. They say their farewells. After Alceste leaves, Barsene and Fenicio arrive. Barsene praises Cleonice, but Fenicio blames her. Cleonice leaves and Fenicio accuses Barsene of pursuing her own plans, suspecting that she loves Alceste herself. Barsene admits it. Fenicio realizes that everything is against his plans.

=== Act 3 ===
Outer court of the palace: Olinto is excited about the forthcoming departure of Alcests. In vain, Fenicio asks that he delay. Cleonice confesses to Alceste that she would rather give up the crown and live in a hut than lose him. She then asks him to follow her to the palace, where she will announce her choice of husband. Olinto, believing Cleonice has chosen Alceste, decides to take revenge.

Fenicio's room in the palace: Fenicio is concerned about the success of his plan to help Alcestis/Demetrio to power. Mitrane assures him that the ships of his allies are already in sight and Alceste's true identity can soon be revealed. Fenicio instructs Mitrane to secretly gather their troops. Then Olinto brings the news that Cleonice has chosen her husband but it is not Alceste. Alceste and two servants bring Fenicio a cloak, crown, and scepter - Cleonice has chosen Fenicio and is waiting for him in the temple for the ceremony. Despite their age difference, Alceste thinks it is a wise choice. Fenicio sends Olinto to the temple to announce his arrival. After he leaves, Fenicio reveals to Alceste that he is Demetrio, the true heir of Syria. Barsene hopes that Alceste will now turn to her and confesses her love to him. However, Alceste's thoughts are elsewhere. Barsene gives up her hope of winning him.

Temple of the Sun: Cleonice and Fenicio enter the temple with their retinue and the two servants, still carrying the mantle, crown and scepter. Fenicio assures Cleonice that Alceste is Syria's true heir. Alceste and Mitrane arrive. Cleonice now asks Alceste to ascend his ancestors' throne. He will only do so with her at his side. Barsene arrives and reports of unrest in the city. A hundred ships have landed and Olinto has spread a rumor that Fenicio is planning a trick to seize power.

Olinto comes with an emissary from the ships and brings a sealed letter from the older Demetrio, written shortly before his death. It clearly names Alceste as his son - Fenicio has raised him under an assumed name. Olinto finally recognizes Alceste as king and regrets his previous ambitions. Alceste and Cleonice ascend the throne. At the end of the opera, the chorus praises the couple's virtue, honor and love.

== Background ==
The historical model for Alceste/Demetrio was Demetrius II Nicator whose history was recounted in the eleventh book of Appian's Rhomaika, in the 32nd volume of the Bibliotheca by Diodorus Siculus and in Justin's extract from volumes 35 and 36 of Pompeius Trogus' Historiae Philippicae. The young Demetrius was exiled to Crete by his father Demetrius I Soter to avoid the usurper Alexander Balas. Later, with the help of Greek mercenaries he was able to return and regain his throne.

The action in Metastasios drama had an antecedent in Pierre Corneilles comédie héroïque Dom Sanche d'Aragon (1649). Demetrio was his first work written for the court in Vienna and the 1731 performance was a great success with music by Antonio Caldara. In 1732 the castrato Antonio Bernacchi played the role of Alceste in two versions, one by Johann Adolph Hasse in Venice (with Faustina Bordoni as Cleonice) and the other by de:Gaetano Maria Schiassi in Milan (where Antonia Negri sang Cleonice). The role of Alceste was later played by other famous castrati including Carestini, Farinelli, Senesino und Venanzio Rauzzini.

== Settings to music ==
The following composers have composed operas using this libretto:

| Year | Composer | Premiered | First performed |
|---|---|---|---|
| 1731 | Antonio Caldara | 4 November 1731, Hoftheater for the celebration of the name day of Emperor Charles VI; also at the winter fair 1734 at the Hoftheater in Brunswick. | Vienna |
| 1732 | Giovanni Antonio Giay | Carnival 1732, Teatro delle Dame (Note: Italian libretto of Giai's setting digitised at the Munich Digitization Center.) also Carnival 1735 at the Teatro de' Nobili in Perugia | Rome |
| 1732 | Johann Adolph Hasse | 10 February 1732, Teatro San Giovanni Crisostomo Reworked many times, also performed as Cleonice; many other adaptations in other Italian cities; 1737 in Ferrara in a reworking by Antonio Vivaldi; 8 February 1740 at the Hoftheater in Dresden; 1767 in Kassel | Venice |
| 1732 | Antonio Bioni | June 1732, Theater im Ballhaus | Wrocław |
| 1732 | de:Gaetano Maria Schiassi | 28 August 1732, Teatro Regio Ducale for the birthday of Elisabeth Christine of Brunswick-Wolfenbüttel; also in 1739 at the Teatro Condes in Lisbon | Milan |
| 1732 | Leonardo Leo | 1 October 1732, Teatro San Bartolomeo (Note: score at the International Music Score Library Project.) first version | Naples |
| 1732 | Giovanni Battista Pescetti | 26? December 1732, Teatro della Pergola (Note: Italian libretto of the setting by Giovanni Battista Pescetti, Florence 1733 at the Museo internazionale e biblioteca della musica.) also February 1737 at the King's Theatre Haymarket in London | Florence |
| 1734 | Francesco Araja | May 1734, Teatro delle Grazie possibly together with Leonardo Leo | Vicenza |
| 1735 | Leonardo Leo | 10 December 1735, Teatro del Castello second version; also 1738 at the Teatro San Carlo in Naples; Riccardo Broschi named as another composer of this lost work | Torremaggiore |
| 1736 | de:Giovanni Battista Mele | 31 January 1736, Teatro del la Cruz Libretto adapted by D. Vincente de Camacho as Por amor y por lealtad recobrar la majestad in two acts | Madrid |
| 1736 | Geminiano Giacomelli | Carnival 1737, Teatro Regio | Turin |
| 1741 | Davide Perez | 13 June 1741, Teatro di Santa Cecilia first version; also 18 December 1748 under the pseudonym "Egidio Lasnel" (possibly his mentor Diego Naselli) at the Teatro San Carlo in Naples; 1751 at the Teatro San Samuele in Venice; 1753 in Lodi | Palermo |
| 1741 | Leonardo Leo | 19 December 1741, Teatro San Carlo third version; also 30 December 1741 at the Teatro Argentina in Rome | Naples |
| 1742 | Angelo Antonio Caroli | 16 January 1742, Teatro Formagliari (Note: Italian libretto of the setting by Angelo Antonio Caroli, Bologna 1742 at the Museo internazionale e biblioteca della musica.) as Il Demetrio re della Siria | Bologna |
| 1742 | Christoph Willibald Gluck | 2 May 1742, Teatro San Samuele Only eight arias survive; also performed as Cleonice; also 3 February 1749 at San Lazzaro dei Mendicanti in Venice | Venice |
| 1742 | Giuseppe Carcani | 23 September 1742, Teatro civico | Crema |
| 1742 | Francesco Maggiore | Autumn 1742, Theater am Tummelplatz Written together with other composers, adapted for Carnival 1749 at the Teatro Filarmonico in Verona | Graz |
| 1744 | de:Paolo Scalabrini | 1744, Oper am Gänsemarkt (Note: Italian/German libretto of the setting by Paolo Scalabrini, Hamburg 1744 at the Staatsbibliothek zu Berlin.) Some arias by other composers. Also performed in 1747 in Leipzig | Hamburg |
| 1744 | Giovanni Battista Lampugnani | 28 April 1744, King's Theatre, Haymarket Libretto adapted by Paolo Antonio Rolli as Alceste | London |
| 1744 | anonymous | 26 October 1744, Teatro della Pergola Other performances of anonymous settings or pasticcio settings in 1751 at the Palazzo Ducale in Modena; 18 May 1757 at the Teatro San Salvatore in Venice; 19 August 1769 at the Teatro in Lucca; 26 November 1763 as Cleonice, regina di Siria at King's Theatre Haymarket in London | Florence |
| 1746 | Egidio Romualdo Duni and/or Georg Christoph Wagenseil | 26 December 1746, Teatro della Pergola also Carnival 1760 at the Teatro Regio Ducale in Milan | Florence |
| 1748 | Baldassare Galuppi | 16 or 27 October 1748, Burgtheater first version | Vienna |
| 1748 | (de) Pietro Pulli | 26 December 1748, Teatro Regio Ducale (Note: Italian libretto of the setting by Pietro Pulli, Milan 1749 at the Museo internazionale e biblioteca della musica.) | Milan |
| 1749 | Niccolò Jommelli | Spring 1749, Teatro Ducale (Note: Italian libretto of the setting by Niccolò Jommelli, Parma 1749 at the Museo internazionale e biblioteca della musica.) (Note: Italian libretto of the setting by Niccolò Jommelli, Madrid 1751.) (Note: Italian libretto of the setting by Niccolò Jommelli, Mannheim 1753 at the Munich Digitization Center.) (Note: Score of the opera by Niccolò Jommelli at the International Music Score Library Project.) adapted 1751 at the Real Teatro del Buen Retiro in Madrid; 1753 at the Hoftheater Mannheim | Parma |
| 1750 | Gaetano Piazza | Carnival 1750, Teatro Omodeo | Pavia |
| 1751 | Vincenzo Pallavicini | Carnival 1751, Teatro dell'Accademia degli Erranti | Brescia |
| 1751 | Lorenzo Gibelli | October 1751, Teatro Solerio | Alessandria |
| 1752 | Giuseppe Scarlatti | 11 June 1752, Teatro Nuovo | Padua |
| 1753 | Ignazio Fiorillo | Summer 1753, Hoftheater | Brunswick |
| 1757 | Gioacchino Cocchi | 1757, King's Theatre Haymarket as Demetrio, re di Siria; together with other composers; also 8 November 1757 at the Teatro Marsigli-Rossi in Bologna | London |
| 1758 | Giovanni Battista Ferrandini | Carnival 1758, Hoftheater | Munich |
| 1758 | Salvatore Perillo | 1758, Teatro Dolfin also Carnival 1761 at the Teatro Filarmonico in Verona | Treviso |
| 1759 | Giuseppe Ponzo | Carnival 1759, Teatro Falcone (Note: Italian libretto of the setting by Giuseppe Ponzo, Reggio 1760 at the Munich Digitization Center.) also 3 May 1760 at the Teatro Comunale in Reggio nell'Emilia; Carnival 1762 at the Teatro Regio in Turin | Genoa |
| 1759 | Giacomo Insanguine | Carnival 1759, Teatro Capranica (Note: Italian libretto of the setting by Giacomo Insanguine, Rome 1759 at the Munich Digitization Center.) | Rome |
| 1760 | Johann Ernst Eberlin | 1760 | |
| 1761 | Baldassare Galuppi | June 1761, Teatro Nuovo second version | Padua |
| 1762 | Nicola Sala | 12 December 1762, Teatro San Carlo | Naples |
| 1763 | Antonio Costantini | 17 July 1763, Teatro Condominiale attribution unsure | Senigallia |
| 1765 | Davide Perez | Carnival 1765, Teatro de Salvaterra second edition | Lisbon |
| 1767 | Pasquale Vinci | Carnival 1767, Teatro Filarmonico together with other composers | Verona |
| 1768 | Antonio Gaetano Pampani | Ascension Day 1768, Teatro San Benedetto | Venice |
| 1769 | Carlo Monza | 3 January 1769, Teatro delle Dame also Carnival 1774 at the Teatro dell'Aquila in Foligno | Rome |
| 1769 | Niccolò Piccinni | 30 May 1769, Teatro San Carlo (Note: Italian libretto of the setting by Niccolò Piccinni, Naples 1769 at the Museo internazionale e biblioteca della musica.) also 6 January 1772 at the Teatro de la Santa Cruz in Barcelona | Naples |
| 1771 | Giovanni Paisiello | Carnival 1771, Teatro di Corte First version; also Carnival 1771 at the Teatro Nazari in Cremona and 1771 at the Royal Theatre, Prague | Modena |
| 1772 | Andrea Bernasconi | Carnival 1772, Hoftheater (Note: Italian/German libretto of the setting by Andrea Bernasconi, Munich 1772 at the Munich Digitization Center.) | Munich |
| 1772 | Pietro Alessandro Guglielmi | 3 June 1772, King's Theatre Haymarket Libretto adapted by Giovan Gualberto Bottarelli; also Summer 1775 at the Teatro San Benedetto in Venice | London |
| 1773 | Josef Mysliveček | 24 May 1773, Teatro Nuovo (Note: Italian libretto of the setting by Josef Mysliveček, Pavia 1773 at the Museo internazionale e biblioteca della musica.) first version | Pavia |
| 1774 | Francesco Bianchi | Carnival 1774 (Note: Italian libretto of the setting by Francesco Bianchi, Venice 1780 at the Museo internazionale e biblioteca della musica.) also Carnival 1780 at the Teatro San Benedetto in Venice; Carnival 1789 at the Teatro Filarmonico in Verona | Cremona |
| 1777 | de:Anton Adam Bachschmid | 1777, de:Raymund Anton von Strasoldo | Eichstätt |
| 1779 | Giovanni Paisiello | 1/12 June 1779, Hoftheater Paisiello|Demetrisecond version, in two acts | Zarskoje Selo |
| 1779 | Josef Mysliveček | 13 August 1779, Teatro San Carlo (Note: Italian libretto of Josef Myslivečekes setting, Naples 1779 at the Museo internazionale e biblioteca della musica.) (Note: score of the Josef Mysliveček opera, ca. 1779 at the International Music Score Library Project.) second version | Naples |
| 1780 | Giuseppe Giordani | Carnival 1780, Teatro di Corte | Modena |
| 1785 | Luigi Cherubini | 1785, King's Theatre Haymarket | London |
| 1786 | Antoine-Frédéric Gresnick | 23 December 1786, King's Theatre Haymarket Libretto adapted by Carlo Francesco Badini as Alceste | London |
| 1787 | Angelo Tarchi | 1787, Teatro alla Scala | Milan |
| 1790 | Luigi Caruso | Spring 1790 | Venice |
| 1823 | Johann Simon Mayr → Demetrio (Mayr) | 27 December 1823, Teatro Regio (Note: Italian libretto of the setting by Johann Simon Mayr, Turin 1824 at the Munich Digitization Center.) Libretto probably also adapted by Lodovico Piossasco Feys into a two-act version. | Turin |
| 1828 | Alessandro Gandini | Autumn 1828, Teatro di Corte in two acts | Modena |
| 1840 | Baltasar Saldoni | 1840, Teatro del la Cruz (Note: Italian libretto of the setting by Baltasar Saldoni, Barcelona 1841) as Cleonice, regina di Siria | Madrid |

== Modern performances and recordings ==
- Johann Simon Mayr: 2011/2012: Performances at the Festival Stand in Moutier, in Poznań and in Ingolstadt as well as a CD by the Orchestre Symphonique du Jura, Opera Obliqua Stand de Moutier, and Opernchor des Teatr Wielki.
