= Harlan York =

American lawyer (born 1969)

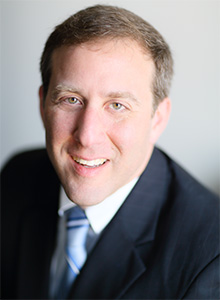
- Born: December 5, 1969 (age 56); Bronx, New York, U.S.
- Education: Tulane University School of Law; SUNY
- Occupation: Lawyer

Harlan York (born December 5, 1969) is an immigration attorney based in Newark, New Jersey.

== Career ==
York is an author, teacher, and frequently cited expert on matters regarding immigration law in the United States. He was the first attorney in New Jersey to win "Immigration Lawyer of the Year" from Best Lawyers, and is a former Immigration Chair with the New Jersey State Bar Association, and Former Co-Chair of the New York State Bar Association CFLS Committee on Immigration. Mr York was also named to the "Furthered 40," a list of the 40 lawyers, accountants, and entrepreneurs who have furthered the educations of their professions. Harlan York currently serves on the American Immigration Lawyers Association (AILA) National Practice Management Committee, as well as moderating panels for the New Jersey Institute for Continuing Legal Education, on the topics of "Protecting Immigrant Victims of Violence " and "Immigration and Crime." His first book, Three Degrees of Law, was published April 1, 2015, and was called a "valuable resource for all professionals" by 201 Magazine.

== Clients ==
York's immigration clients range from high tech professionals and PhDs to manual laborers, skilled workers, and victims of violence. Some of his higher profile clients include world-renowned chess player Garry Kasparov, and Olympic gold medalist Peter Rono. York has also worked with a number of high-profile musicians including Grammy-nominated La India, and rocker Joe Lynn Turner.

== Media and lectures ==
As an expert on immigration law, York's insight is sought by the media as well as his professional colleagues. Most recently York has appeared on Bloomberg Law Radio, and the New Jersey Journal.. The bilingual attorney has appeared on national television on CBS This Morning with Charlie Rose and Primer Impacto on Univision, and has spoken about a host of immigration issues on Telemundo, NBC, and PBS. York often lectures on immigration law at institutions such as Columbia Law School, New York Law School, Rutgers Law School and other sites. He is a well-known speaker at the New Jersey State Bar Foundation and Federal Bar Association events. He was a judge at the American Mock Trial Tournament at Yale University. York's highly rated Lawline.com lecture series is available for attorneys, law students and the public to study online.

== Harlan York and Associates ==
Harlan York is the founder of Harlan York and Associates, an internationally recognized immigration law firm with clients worldwide. Harlan York and Associates has received a Tier One ranking by U.S. News & World Report Best Law Firms. The firm's attorneys appear regularly at Immigration Courts and Immigration Service offices across the United States.

Harlan York and Associates handles all immigration matters, including:

- Deportation and Detention
- Federal Appeals
- Visa Petitions
- Permanent Residence Applications
- Citizenship
- Employment and Family-Based Immigration
- Deferred Action
- All Applications for Victims of Violence
- Immigration for same-sex couples

== Education ==
York attended Choate Rosemary Hall and University at Albany, SUNY, both on scholarship. He was admitted to the New Jersey and Connecticut State Bars as well as the United States Supreme Court, after earning his Juris Doctor from the Tulane University School of Law.

His work was featured by Choate Rosemary Hall in its alumni magazine in 2012.

York studied Kyokushin Karate as a youth, competed in amateur wrestling as a teenager and trained in Brazilian Jiu-Jitsu as an adult. He was certified as a women's self-defense instructor by Steve Kardian, internationally regarded security and safety expert.

York resides in Bergen County, New Jersey, with his wife, daughter and son.
