= Belisa Vranich =

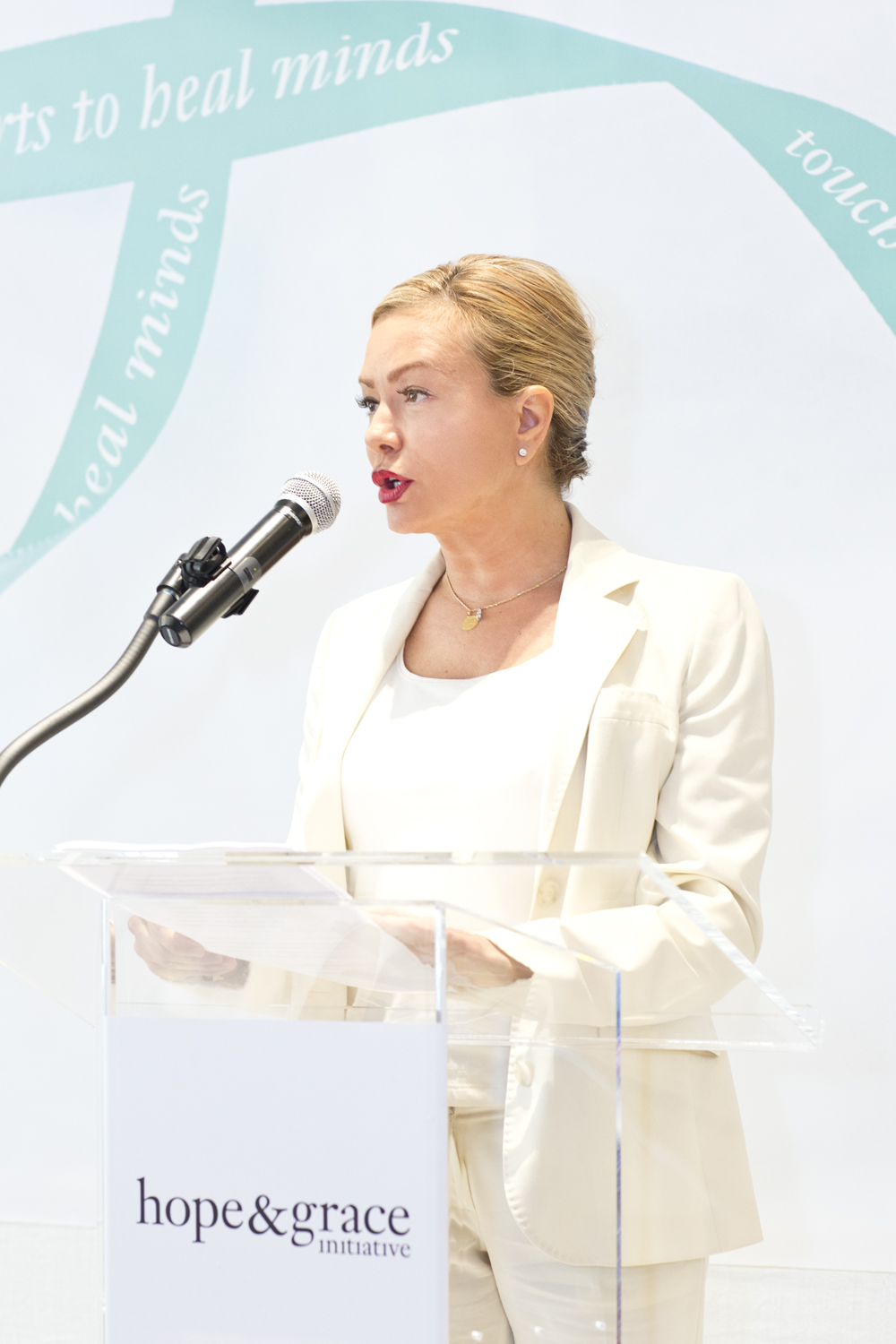
Dr. Belisa Vranich speaking at the Hope and Grace Initiative

Belisa Vranich (born 28 April 1966) is an American clinical psychologist, author, public speaker, and founder of The Breathing Class (TM). She has been an active consultant and columnist, promoting intentional breathing practices to improve health and providing psychological viewpoints on sex and relationships. She is an advocate for women's health, as well as volunteering, mentorship, and animal rescue.

== Education ==
Belisa Vranich received her doctorate in psychology from New York University and completed an internship at Bellevue Hospital, with specialization in neuropsychology, psychiatric consultation and liaison, and bilingual treatment. She is a certified Breathwork Practitioner and a member of the Global Professional Breathwork Alliance.

== Career ==
=== Clinical psychologist ===
Vranich has practiced clinical psychology privately since 2000, specializing in a broad range of disciplines revolving around health and fitness, including stress reduction, nutrition, sexual health, relationships, trauma, and addiction. She previously served as the Director of Public Education at the Mental Health Association of NYC, and has consulted for the National Mental Health Association in Washington, DC. She has also served as a school psychologist in the South Bronx and worked with parolees and their families as part of the Brooklyn Aids Task Force. Vranich began developing educational campaigns, presenting, and lecturing nationwide on health and mental health in 2004. She eventually launched The Breathing Class as a summary solution to many of the underlying problems she witnessed. She is currently on Philosophy’s Hope and Grace campaign advisory board and regularly serves as an expert witness or psychologist for a variety of prominent media outlets.

=== The Breathing Class ===
The Breathing Class is a nationwide training program founded by Belisa Vranich to address physical and psychological problems related to oxygenation deficiency through anatomically congruous breathing techniques. Practices are taught with personal responsibility and mindfulness as the core, using measurements to demonstrate stress problems and poor physical function around a variety of well studied methods which vary in focus depending on the goals of the class. The program promotes breath training as a means to increased focus, better physical performance, and improved mental health.

Vranich, the class, and Vranich's techniques have been featured in articles and interviews by French Vogue, Shape magazine, Details Magazine, Jiu-Jitsu magazine, W Magazine, The New York Observer, The Wall Street Journal, and The Lisa Oz Show, among others.

Collaborators include women's self-defense expert Steve Kardian and his Defend University and jiu-jutsu instructor Henry Akins, through Breathing for Warriors, a special version of the class tailored to professional athletes. A third version of the class is focused on breath techniques for metabolism, stress management, and healthier eating. Dr. Vranich teaches the class regularly in New York and Los Angeles, with additional locations including corporations, military bases, hospitals, and other service organizations throughout the US (ex. Coty Inc, NYC Health and Hospitals, UCLA, Young Presidents Organization, Wenner Media, The US Department of Justice).

=== Health & fitness ===
In addition to her work for Huffington Post, Belisa served as the health and sex editor at Men’s Fitness magazine and has served as a columnist for the New York Post, New York Daily News, Foxnews.com, Spin magazine, XOJane, and The Fix. She has also served as an advisor for the Golds Gym Fitness Institute and Shape magazine. She was the Director of Public Education at the Mental Health Association of NYC

== Published work ==
1. Breathing for Warriors: Master Your Breath to Unlock More Strength, Greater Endurance, Sharper Precision, Faster Recovery, and an Unshakable Inner Game. Belisa Vranich, Psy.D. St. Martin's Essentials (March 10, 2020) ISBN 9781250308221
2. Breathe: 14 Days to Oxygenating, Recharging, and Fueling Your Body & Brain. Belisa Vranich, Psy.D.; The Breathing Class Press (January 30, 2014) ISBN 978-0991358908
3. He's Got Potential: A Field Guide to Shy Guys, Bad Boys, Intellectuals, Cheaters, and Everything in Between. Belisa Vranich, Psy.D.; Wiley; 1 edition (January 1, 2010). ISBN 978-0470267011
4. Get a Grip: Your Two Week Mental Makeover. Belisa Vranich, Psy.D.; Wiley; 1 edition (November 1, 2009). ISBN 978-0470383193
5. The Seven Beliefs: A Step-by-Step Guide to Help Latinas Recognize and Overcome Depression. Belisa Vranich, Psy.D & Jorge, R. Petit MD.; Rayo; 1 edition (April 1, 2003). ISBN 978-0060012656

== Media ==
Belisa Vranich has been interviewed by TV hosts Anderson Cooper, Soledad O’Brien, Joy Behar, Matt Lauer, Meredith Vieira, Juju Chang, Bill O’Reilly, Nancy Grace, Lisa Oz, Perez Hilton, and Alisyn Camerota. Belisa has contributed to shows on CNN, Fox News, The Today Show, Good Morning America, Inside Edition, ABC News, and In The Mix. She has contributed as an author or expert in numerous publications, including Los Angeles Times, The Wall Street Journal, Cosmopolitan, The New York Observer, AARP, Men’s Journal, Men’s Fitness, Good Housekeeping, Parenting, Women's Health Magazine, W Magazine, New York Post, and The New York Times.
