= Belisa (Olsen) =

Belisa is a 1966 opera in four scenes by Poul Rovsing Olsen. It is one of at least six operas based on Lorca's Amor de don Perlimplín con Belisa en su jardín.

== Recording ==
- Belisa - Eir Inderhaug, Sten Byriel, Marianne Rørholm, Anne Margrethe Dahl, Lise-Lotte Nielsen, Elisabeth Halling Vocal Group Ars Nova, Odense Symphony Orchestra, Tamás Vető
