= Arnold Elston =

American composer and educator

Arnold Elston (September 30, 1907 – June 6, 1971) was an American composer and educator. Though he studied with Anton Webern, he did not himself use the twelve-tone technique.

== Early life and career ==
Elston was born in New York on September 30, 1907. He became a private pupil of Rubin Goldmark in 1928, and continued to study with him until 1930, in which year he received his A.B. from the College of the City of New York. He went on to take an M.A. from Columbia University in 1932, in which year he also won a Joseph H. Bearns Prize and the Mosenthal Traveling Fellowship. Using the funds from these prizes Elston was able to study with Anton Webern in Vienna. Though the experience was important for Elston, his music was never imitative of Webern in technique or style. He did not employ the twelve-tone technique, but his colleague Andrew Imbrie later observed that the influence of Webern could be heard in his "flexible use of motif as a unifying force, in a certain sprightliness of texture, and in a forward-pushing upbeat quality of phrase". Elston himself was later to write,

I am clearly in the tradition of the Schoenberg school, probably closer to Schoenberg than to Webern or Berg. But I have never espoused the 12-tone technique. The early works of the Viennese school, such as Schoenberg's Five Orchestra Pieces, or Webern's Op. 6, or Op. 10, have always given me more pleasure than Webern's Symphony or Schoenberg's 3rd and 4th String Quartets.

Elston returned to the US in 1935 and began a teaching career, working first at Vassar College and later at the College of the City of New York. In 1939 he studied conducting with Arthur Fiedler. His Harvard doctoral thesis, presented in 1939, was entitled On Musical Dynamics. He then taught at Cambridge Junior College and gave instruction in composition at Longy School of Music, before securing a position at the University of Oregon in 1941.

== Berkeley ==
In 1957 Elston's chamber opera Sweeney Agonistes was premiered at the University of California Studio Theatre in Berkeley. Elston had composed the music between 1948 and 1950, using the second of the two fragments which comprise T. S. Eliot's Sweeney Agonistes as its libretto. In this performance the chamber orchestra of Elston's original score was replaced by a reduction for two pianos.

In 1958 Elston was appointed Professor of Music at the University of California, Berkeley. His next opera, The Love of Don Perlimplin, based on Federico García Lorca's The Love of Don Perlimplín and Belisa in the Garden, was completed in 1958 and premiered in the Dedication Festival of the Alfred Hertz Memorial Hall of Music at the university later in that year.

Elston composed two works that were important contributions to American chamber music. The String Quartet completed in 1961 was the only one of Elston's works to be published during his lifetime, and was recorded by the Pro Arte Quartet. His Piano Trio was completed in 1967.

Elston's cantata Great Age, Behold Us, completed in 1966, is a setting of words from Saint-John Perse's Chronique. It was premiered in 1968 at Hertz Hall by the Oakland Symphony under Gerhard Samuel, alongside new works by Henri Lazarof, Richard Swift, Karl Kohn, and Douglas Allanbrook. He completed an orchestral work in three movements, Prelude, Paean, and Furioso, in 1970.

== Death ==
Elston died suddenly in 1971, whilst in Vienna.
