= Knud Jeppesen =

Danish musicologist and composer (1892–1974)

Knud Jeppesen (15 August 1892 – 14 June 1974) was a Danish musicologist and composer. He was the leading scholar of the composer Giovanni Pierluigi da Palestrina, about whose life and music he wrote numerous studies.

== Biography ==
Jeppesen demonstrated early musical talent at age 10 when he was first encouraged by Hakon Andersen and Paul Hellmuth, although he was largely self-taught. Completing primary education in 1911, he first worked in Elbing and Liegnitz (Eastern Germany) as an opera coach and conductor. He found employment in Berlin in 1914, but returned to Denmark because of the outbreak of war. In Copenhagen he became a pupil of prominent Danish composers Carl Nielsen and Thomas Laub, and studied musicology at Copenhagen University with Angul Hammerich. He passed the organist exam at the Royal Danish Conservatory of music in 1916. Owing to Hammerich's retirement, there was nobody on the faculty of the university to examine Jeppesen's work; therefore, he submitted his dissertation to the University of Vienna, where it was reviewed by Guido Adler and Jeppesen was awarded a doctorate in 1922.

He was organist at Copenhagen's St. Stephens church from 1917 to 1932 and at the Holmen Church from 1932 to 1947. He taught music theory at the Royal Danish Academy of Music from 1920 to 1947, also serving on its board of directors. In 1946, he was appointed to the new post of professor of musicology at Aarhus University, where he founded (in 1950) an Institute of Musicology which he directed until 1957. His students included the composers Vagn Holmboe (in Copenhagen) and Bent Lorentzen (in Aarhus).

Following his retirement in 1957, Jeppesen resided in Italy, enabling him to make several discoveries in Italian libraries culminating in his magnum opus, La frottola (1968–70), a detailed study and bibliography of frottole, the leading genre of Italian popular, secular songs in the late fifteenth and early sixteenth century. From 1927 until his death he was active in the International Musicological Society, serving as president from 1949 to 1952. He was also a member (from 1963) of the Italian Accademia dei Lincei.

== Musicology ==
Jeppesen's name is invariably associated with the study of musical counterpoint, particularly in the style of Palestrina, of whom he was the leading scholar of his day. His 1930 work Counterpoint: The Polyphonic Vocal Style of the Sixteenth Century has been a standard textbook since its appearance in German (1935) and English (1939), and remains in print today (the third and final edition remains untranslated). His doctoral thesis was expanded in 1923 and appeared in English in 1927 as The Style of Palestrina and the Dissonance – a work which The New Grove cites as being the "most distinguished and influential example of stylistic analysis at this time".

His published writings mostly regard music by Italian and Danish composers from the sixteenth and seventeenth centuries. Jeppesen engaged in much primary research – locating early manuscript and print copies of old scores and preparing editions with annotations and commentary. In 1962, he finished the first complete thematic catalog of Palestrina's oeuvre. Among his accomplishments were the discovery of ten previously unknown masses by Palestrina in 1949.

== Music ==
Jeppesen's early efforts at composition were poorly received and he turned away from composition in 1919, only to resume after a fifteen-year hiatus. He is known for well-crafted songs set to Danish texts, church music, and motets. He also wrote cantatas, organ music, and an opera, Rosaura, which was performed by the Royal Danish Theatre on September 20, 1950. He also made many contributions to Danish hymnology, and his Bygen flygter, Forunderligt så sødt et smil is a classic with Danish church choirs. His style incorporates his knowledge of early counterpoint but also the style of late Viennese romantics including Gustav Mahler, to whom he was introduced by Guido Adler. From 1916 to 1931, Jeppesen was Nielsen's closest associate, and Jeppesen wrote several important articles about that composer.

=== Compositions ===
- 1906 "Nordisk Festmarche" for 3 violins, cello, harmonium or piano
- 1911 Staka, Symphonic poem (tenor and piano)
- 1912 "Foraar" for soloists and orchestra (text: Johannes Jørgensen)
- 1915 String quartet in F (student composition)
- 1919 Violin sonata
- 1925 Kantate for Rungsted Kostskoles Samfund
- 1930 Sonatine in C major (piano)
- 1934 Gud, vend Øren til min Bøn (Motet 4-part mixed choir)
- 1935 Hvad er et Menneske? (Motet for 4-part mixed choir)
- 1936 Reformation Cantata
- 1937 Domine, refugium factus es nobis – Cantata for soprano, and flute or violin solo
- 1938 Sjællandsfar (symphony)
- 1940 To Patetiske sange
- 1941 Horn concerto
- 1941 Lille Sommertrio (Little Summer Trio) (for flute, cello and piano)
- 1942 Prelude and fugue in E minor (organ)
- 1942/45 Te Deum Danicum (for the opening of the Danish Radio concert hall)
- 1944 Lille trio (La primavera)
- 1944 Haglskyen (8 part male chorus. Text: Knud Wiinstedt)
- 1945 Dronning Dagmar Messe
- 1946 Kantate ved indvielsen af Aarhus Universitets hovedbygning
- 1949 Ørnen og skarnbassen (for the Københavns Drengekors 25 year jubilee)
- 1950 Rosaura, opera in three acts after texts by the composer and Carlo Goldoni
- 1951 Kantate ved genindvielsen af Haderslev Domkirke
- 1951 "Du gav mig o herre en lod af din jord" (C. R. Sundell)
- 1951 Dagen viger og gaar bort, cantata for alto soloist, mixed chorus, string orchestra or organ (text: Dorothea Engelbretsdatter)
- 1952 Kantate ved Det Jyske Musikkonservatoriums 25-års jubilæum
- 1953 Vintergæk er brudt af mulden (Hymn)
- 1957 50 choral preludes for organ
- 1965 (?) Passacaglia (organ)
- Intonazione boreale (organ)
- Landsbymusik (small orchestra)

=== Discography ===
- 1996 Musik ved Susåen Storstrøms Kammerensemble (Lille Sommertrio) (Helikon – HCD1023)
- 2003 Monteverdi – Knud Jeppesen Musikstuderendes Kammerkor, conductor: Finn Mathiassen (Point – PCD5161/2)

== Editions ==
- with V. Brøndal: Der Kopenhagener Chansonnier (Copenhagen, 1927, 2 cd edition 1965)
- Vaerker af Mogens Pedersøn, Dania sonans, i (Copenhagen, 1933)
- with V. Brøndal: Die mehrstimmige italienische Laude um 1500 (Leipzig and Copenhagen, 1935 (revised))
- Die italienische Orgelmusik am Anfang des Cinquecento (Copenhagen, 1943, enlarged 2 cd edition 1960)
- Dietrich Buxtehude: Min Gud er med mig (Der Herr ist mit mir), Samfundet til udgivelse af dansk musik, 3rd ser., lxxxix (Copenhagen, 1946)
- La flora, arie &c. antiche italiane (Copenhagen, 1949)
- Giovanni Pierluigi da Palestrina: Le messe di Mantova, Le opere complete, xviii–xix (Rome, 1954)
- Balli antichi veneziani per cembalo (Copenhagen, 1962)
- Italia sacra musica: musiche corali italiane sconosciute della prima metà del Cinquecento (Copenhagen, 1962)
- Founding editor of Dania Sonans, issuing editions of early Danish music.

== Writings ==
- "Die Dissonanzbehandlung bei Palestrina" (diss., University of Vienna, 1922; enlarged Copenhagen, 1923, as Palestrinastil med saerligt henblik paa dissonansbehandlingen; Ger. trans., 1925; Eng. trans. as The Style of Palestrina and the Dissonance, 1927, 2/1946 (revised))
- "Das 'Sprunggesetz' des Palestrinastils bei betonten Viertelnoten (halben Taktzeiten)", Musikwissenschaftlicher Kongress: Basel 1924, pp. 211–19
- "Johann Joseph Fux und die moderne Kontrapunkttheorie", Deutsche Musikgesellschaft: Kongress I: Leipzig 1925, pp. 187–8
- "Das isometrische Moment in der Vokalpolyphonie", Festschrift Peter Wagner, ed. K. Weinmann (Leipzig, 1926), pp. 87–100
- "Über einen Brief Palestrinas", Festschrift Peter Wagner, ed. K. Weinmann (Leipzig, 1926), pp. 100–07
- "Die Textlegung in der Chansonmusik des späteren 15. Jahrhunderts", Beethoven-Zentenarfeier: Vienna 1927, pp. 155–7
- "Die neuentdeckten Bücher der Lauden des Ottaviano dei Petrucci und andere musikalische Seltenheiten der Biblioteca Colombina zu Sevilla", Zeitschrift für Musikwissenschaft, xii (1929–30), pp. 73–89.
- Kontrapunkt (vokalpolyfoni) [Counterpoint] (Copenhagen, 1930, 3rd ed. 1962; Ger. trans., 1935, 5/1970; Eng. trans., 1939, 2 cd edition)
- "Wann entstand die Marcellus-Messe?", Studien zur Musikgeschichte: Festschrift für Guido Adler (Vienna, 1930), pp. 126–36
- "Die 3 Gafurius-Kodizes der Fabbrico del Duomo, Milano", Acta Musicologia, iii (1931), 14–28
- "Ein venezianisches Laudenmanuskript", Theodor Kroyer: Festschrift, ed. H. Zenck, H. Schultz and W. Gerstenberg (Regensburg, 1933), p. 69–76
- "Diderik Buxtehude" (Dieterich Buxtehude), Dansk musiktidsskrift, xii (1937), p. 63–70
- "Rom og den danske musik", Rom og Danmark gennem tiderne, ii, ed. L. Bobé (Copenhagen, 1937), pp. 153–76
- "Über einige unbekannte Frottolenhandschriften", Acta Musicologia, xi (1939), pp. 81–114
- "Venetian Folk-Songs of the Renaissance", papers of the American Musicological Society, 1939, pp. 62–75
- "Eine musiktheoretische Korrespondenz des früheren Cinquecento", Acta Musicologia, xiii (1941), pp. 3–39
- "Das Volksliedgut in den Frottolenbüchern des Octavio Petrucci (1504–1514)", Emlékkönyv Kodály Zoltán hatvanadik születésnapjára, ed. B. Gunda (Budapest, 1943), pp. 265–74
- "Marcellus-Probleme", Acta Musicologia, xvi–xvii (1944–5), pp. 11–38
- "Choralis Constantinus som liturgisk dokument", Festskrift til O.M. Sandvik, ed. O. Gurvin (Oslo, 1945), pp. 52–82
- "Et nodefund paa Konservatoriet", Dansk musiktidsskrift, xx (1945), pp. 41–7, pp. 67–70
- "Carl Nielsen, a Danish Composer", Music Review, vii (1946), pp. 170–77
- "Zur Kritik der klassischen Harmonielehre", International Musicological Society Congress Report IV: Basel 1949, pp. 23–34
- "The Recently Discovered Mantova Masses of Palestrina: a Provisional Communication", Acta Musicologia, xxii (1950), pp. 36–47
- "Pierluigi da Palestrina, Herzog Gugliemo Gonzaga und die neugefundenen Mantovaner-Messen Palestrinas: ein ergänzender Bericht", Acta Musicologia, xxv (1953), pp. 132–79
- "Cavazzoni-Cabezón", Journal of the American Musicological Society, viii (1955), pp. 81–5
- "Eine frühe Orgelmesse aus Castell'Arquato", Archiv für Musikwissenschaft, xii (1955), pp. 187–205
- "Palestriniana: ein unbekanntes Autogramm und einige unveröffentlichte Falsibordoni des Giovanni Pierluigi da Palestrina", Miscelánea en homenaje a Monseñor Higinio Anglés (Barcelona, 1958–61), pp. 417–30
- "Et par notationstekniske problemer i det 16. aarhundredes musik og nogle dertil knyttede iagttagelser (taktindelling partitur)", Svensk tidskirft för musikforskning, xliii (1961), pp. 171–93
- "Ein altvenetianisches Tanzbuch", Festschrift Karl Gustav Fellerer zum sechzigsten Geburtstag, ed. H. Hüschen (Regensburg, 1962), pp. 245–63
- "Über italienische Kirchenmusik in der ersten Hälfte des 16. Jahrhunderts", Studia musicologica Academiae scientiarum hungaricae, iii (1962), pp. 149–60
- "Carl Nielsen paa hundredaarsdagen: nogle erindringer", Dansk aarbog for musikforskning, iv (1964–5), pp. 137–50
- "The Manuscript Florence Biblioteca Nazionale Centrale, Banco rari 230: an Attempt at Diplomatic Reconstruction", Aspects of Medieval and Renaissance Music: a Birthday Offering to Gustave Reese, ed. J. LaRue and others (New York, 1966 revised), pp. 440–47
- "Monteverdi, Kapellmeister an S. Barbara?", Claudio Monteverdi e il suo tempo: Venice, Mantua and Cremona 1968, pp. 313–22
- La frottola (Århus and Copenhagen, 1968–70)
- "An Unknown Pre-Madrigalian Music Print in Relation to other Contemporary Italian Sources (1520–1530)", Studies in Musicology: Essays … in Memory of Glen Haydon, ed. J.W. Pruett (Chapel Hill, NC, 1969), pp. 3–17
- "Alcune brevi annotazioni sulla musicologia", Scritti in onore di Luigi Ronga (Milan and Naples, 1973), pp. 275–8
