= Robert Davidsohn =

German journalist and historian

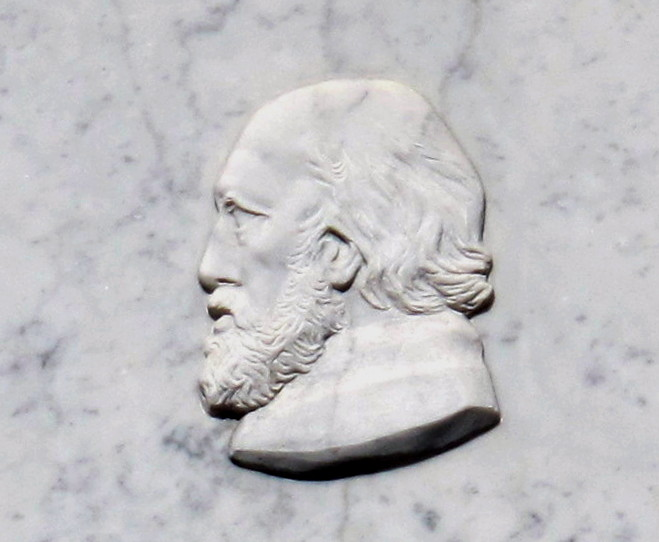

Robert Davidsohn (26 April 1853 – 17 September 1937) was a German journalist and historian. He is known for his studies of medieval Florence.
