= The Steel of Madrid =

Play written by Lope de Vega

The Steel of Madrid (El acero de Madrid) is a 1608 play by the Spanish writer Lope de Vega, considered part of the Spanish Golden Age of literature.

== Plot ==
A common man, Lisardo, and a noblewoman, Belisa, are two young lovers. They first meet after Belisa faints in order to get away from Octavio; she triggers this fainting spell by ingesting Steel Water. After the water "cures" her, she meets Lisardo and believes it is love at first sight. The issue that arises then, involves Belisa's father, who has promised her to Octavio. With the knowledge that Belisa is often around her Aunt Teodora, Lisardo's good friend Reselo, pretends to court Teodora. This provides Lisardo with the opportunity to meet with Belisa. This action by Reselo infuriates his lover Marcela who is in the midst of being courted by Florencio.

In the end, the two lovers overcome numerous trials, arising from miscommunication and misunderstanding, and are finally married.

== Background ==
The basis of The Steel of Madrid came from early 17th century habits involving the ingestion of clay. This was a ritual practiced mostly by women with the belief of steel water providing a cure of sorts.

== Characters ==
Lisardo: A commoner who courts the Noble women, Belisa. He goes through a series of trials to talk and later marry her.

Belisa: A noble woman who loves a commoner, Lisardo, but is in a forced engagement with Octavio.

Octavio: Belisa's Betrothed.

Belisa's Father: Marries off Belisa to Octavio and doesn't approve of Lisardo.

Riselo: Lisardo's best friend and lover to Marcela. He pretends to court Teodora so Lisardo can talk to Belisa causing issues with Marcela.

Teodora: Belisa's aunt who is often near the young girl. She is “courted” by Riselo unaware of the plan to get Lisardo to talk to Belisa.

Marcela: Riselo's lover enraged at him as he “courts” Teodora. Currently, she is being courted by Florencio

Florencio: A man courting the enraged Marcela

== Text ==
The play comes from Lope De Vega's series called the Partes de comedias (The Comedy parts). This was his XI Parte of 1618. The way Lope de Vega intended his audience to view his works was by reading them at home.

== Adaptations ==
In 1995, at the Comedy Theatre, Madrid Spain, the play was performed by Yolanda Arestegui, Héctor Colomé, Manúel Navarro, Arturo Querejeta, Pilar Massa and Ana María Barbany. Directed by José Luis Castro.

== Context and interpretation ==
Lope De Vega created characters based on people he knew. Belisa was based on his wife, Isabel de Urbina, after he was exiled from Madrid.

At some point in the play, Belisa drinks steel water to leave Octavio and meets Lisardio. This happened quite often in Spain because the uses of Steel water as a common remedy was quite common. In Madrid, women would pretend to faint to get rid of suitors and ingest the steel water to ‘wake up’. This is noted in the title of the play, the Steel of Madrid, since the special properties of the steel water and the way that women would use it.

== Sources ==
- De Armas, Frederick A (2013). "Lope de Vega. Comedias parte XI, tomos I–II. Eds. Laura Fernández and Gonzalo Pónton. Biblioteca Lope de Vega. Madrid: Gredos Editorial S.A., 2012. Xvi + 2100 pp. €40". Renaissance Quarterly. 66 (3): 1099–1101. doi:10.1086/673680. ISBN 978-84-249-3658-7. JSTOR 10.1086/673680.
- Hydrae. Casa Museo Lope de Vega, casamuseolopedevega.org/en/lope-and-his-work/cronologia-en.
- Morley, S. Griswold (1945). "El acero de Madrid". Hispanic Review. 13 (2): 166–169. JSTOR 470095.
- Rodríguez, Daniel Fernández. “Partes de comedias.” Prolope, prolope.uab.cat/obras/partes_de_comedias.html.
- Torres, Rosana. “Jose Luis Castro llega al teatro de la Comedia con 'El acero de Madrid'.” EL PAÍS, Síguenos en Síguenos en Twitter Síguenos en Facebook Síguenos en Twitter Síguenos en Instagram, 30 Nov. 1995, elpais.com/diario/1995/12/01/cultura/817772409_850215.html.
