= John Sullivan Dwight =

American music critic and Unitarian minister

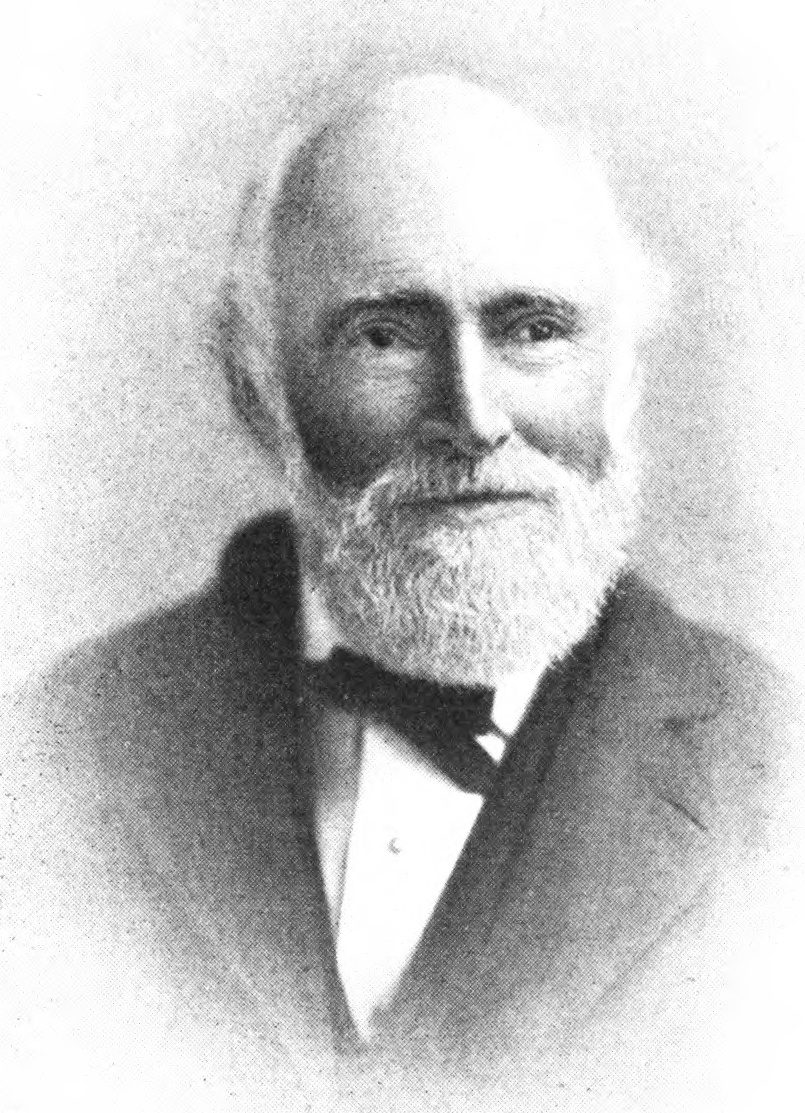
- Born: May 13, 1813; Boston, Massachusetts, U.S.
- Died: September 5, 1893 (aged 80); Boston, Massachusetts, U.S.
- Education: Harvard University
- Known for: Dwight's Journal of Music; "O Holy Night" (English text)

John Sullivan Dwight (May 13, 1813 – September 5, 1893) was an American classical music critic, transcendentalist, school director, and minister. He is considered America's first influential music critic.

== Biography ==
Dwight was born in Boston, the son of John Dwight, M.D. (1773–1852), and Mary Corey. He was a member of the New England Dwight family through his paternal grandfather, John Dwight, Jr. (1740–1816). He graduated from Harvard College in 1832 and then prepared for the Unitarian ministry at Harvard Divinity School, from which he graduated in 1836. Dwight was ordained a minister in 1840, but ministry proved not to be his vocation. It was incredibly brief and tumultuous. Instead he developed a deep interest in music, in particular that of Ludwig van Beethoven.

Dwight served as director of the school at the Brook Farm commune, the farm being a utopian communal living experiment, where he also taught music and organized musical and theatrical events. About this time he began writing a regular column on music.

Brook Farm collapsed financially in 1847, but Dwight set up a cooperative house in Boston and began a career in musical journalism. He married singer Mary Bullard (daughter of Silas Bullard and Mary Ann Barrett) on February 11, 1851. In 1852, he founded Dwight's Journal of Music, which became one of the most respected and influential such periodicals in the country in the mid-19th century. Among the early writers was Alexander Wheelock Thayer, who would become one of the first major music historians in the country. Other contributors included John Knowles Paine, William F. Apthorp, W. S. B. Mathews and C. H. Brittan.

In 1855, Dwight wrote English lyrics for the Christmas carol "O Holy Night"; translated from the original text written in French by Placide Cappeau and set to music by French opera composer Adolphe Adam.

Together with his friend and colleague Otto Dresel, who emigrated from Leipzig in 1848 and settled in Boston in 1852, the two "contributed singly and jointly to the shaping of American taste for the European classical tradition in music".

In his criticism of a concert given by the contemporary American pianist Louis Moreau Gottschalk, Dwight stepped into the trap of Gottschalk claiming a Beethoven work as his own and identifying one of his own works as a Beethoven. When the already previously hostile Dwight praised the "wrong" piece, the composer sent a note apologizing for the "printer’s error" in the program and wryly thanking him for the praise.

His wife died on September 6, 1860. They had no children. He died in Boston on September 5, 1893, and is buried at Forest Hills Cemetery.
