= Dwight's Journal of Music =

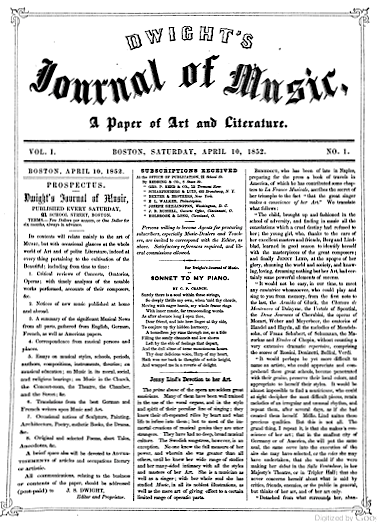
- Issue no.1, 1852
- Categories: Music
- Frequency: Weekly or Biweekly
- Founder: John Sullivan Dwight
- Founded: 1852
- Final issue Number: September 3, 1881; 145 years ago Vol. XLI (41), No. 16
- Country: United States
- Based in: Boston
- Language: English

Dwight's Journal of Music (1852–1881, DJM) was an American music journal, one of the most respected and influential such periodicals in the country in the mid-19th century. John Sullivan Dwight created the Journal and published it in Boston, Massachusetts. Among the early writers was Alexander Wheelock Thayer, who would become one of the first major music historians in the country. Other contributors have included John Knowles Paine, William F. Apthorp, W. S. B. Mathews and C. H. Brittan.

The Journal was purchased by music publisher Oliver Ditson in 1858, with Dwight staying on as its editor.

== Publication details ==
The Journal was published weekly beginning on Saturday, April 10, 1852, with each volume consisting of 26 numbers. Thus, the odd-numbered volumes ran from April to near the end of September, and the even-numbered volumes, from early October to the end of March of the following year. In 1865 the journal was published biweekly and each volume ran for one complete year. In 1879, starting with Vol. XXXIX (39), the publication year began running from January to December. The last issue was Vol. XLI (41), No. 16 (September 3, 1881).
