= Zeitschrift für Musikwissenschaft =

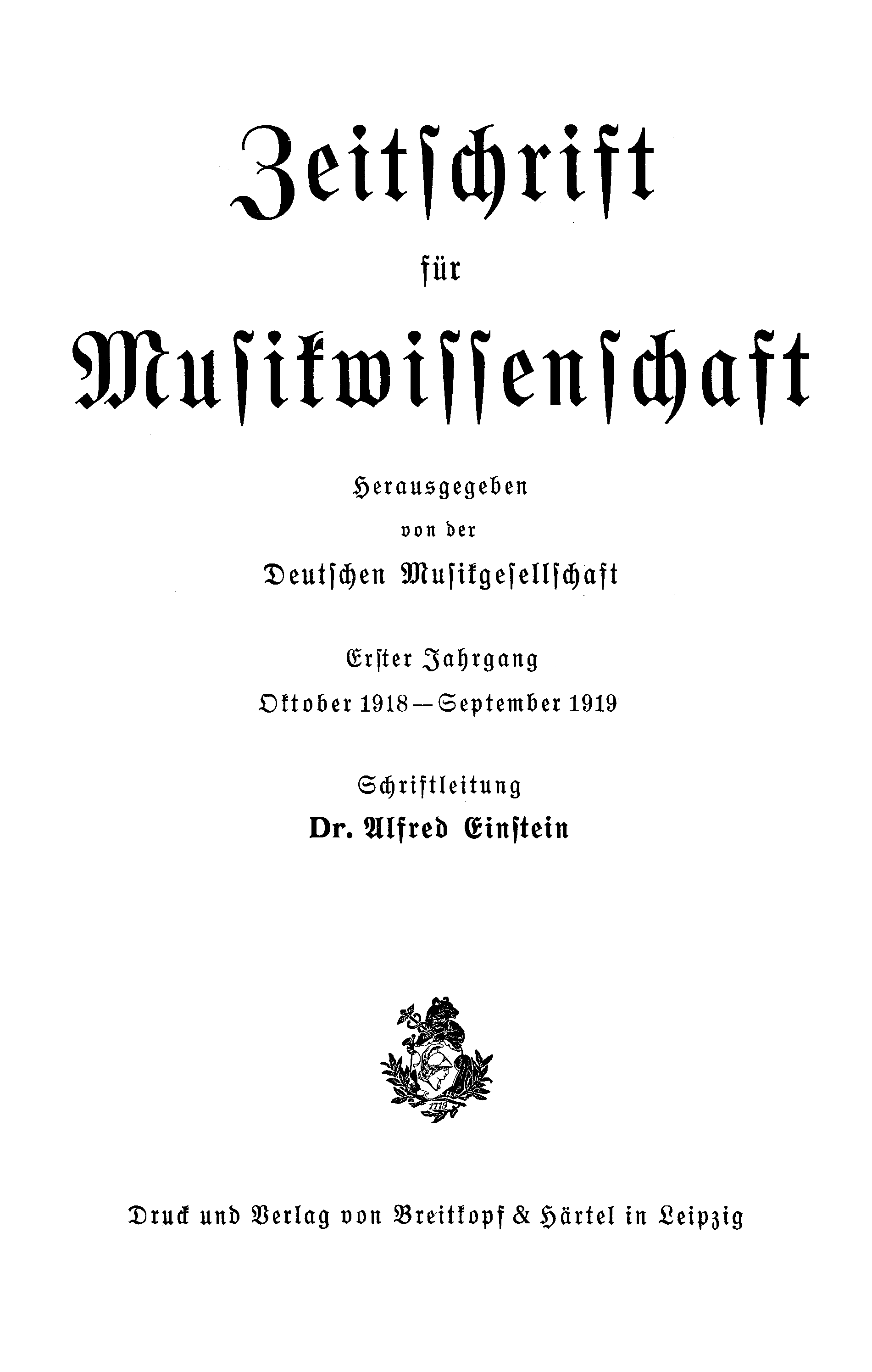
Title page of the first issue 1918

The Zeitschrift für Musikwissenschaft was a musicology magazine which was published by Breitkopf & Härtel in Leipzig, from 1918 to 1935. It was edited by the German Music Society or German Society for Musicology.

Since its first publication in 1918, the musicologist Alfred Einstein was the editor of the journal. During the era of National Socialism he was forced in 1933 to take over the editorial office of Max Schneider. Its successor was the Archiv für Musikforschung (AfMf), which appeared from 1936 to 1943. Publisher and editor were the same as before.

Note: The Frankfurter Zeitung für Musikwissenschaft (FZMw, ISSN 1438-857X) edited by Wolfgang Krebs, Goethe University Frankfurt, from 1998 and now discontinued, is an unrelated journal.
