= Steve Kardian =

American law enforcement officer

Steve Kardian (born October 7, 1957) is an American career law enforcement officer, detective, sergeant, chief criminal investigator, and contractor for the United States Marshals Service, who specializes in crime prevention and risk reduction for women's safety. Kardian lectures, teaches, and consults internationally. Between his personal engagements and his self-defense/safety certification organization, Defend University, Kardian trains thousands of people each year on safety and self-defense, as well as strategies and tactics uniquely tailored to women's safety.

== Biography ==
Kardian was born on October 7, 1957, in White Plains, New York. When he was 17, he was visiting his girlfriend's family in Old Saybrook, CT when he witnessed a woman jump up from her beach chair and begin screaming and waving her arms frantically. A large mound of sand had collapsed onto and buried her 8-year-old nephew. Kardian rushed over and dug the child out, who was not breathing. Others gathered around, but in a crowd of 20 people, none knew CPR. Kardian didn't either, but he successfully performed the resuscitation from a memory of a pamphlet that he had read, saving the child's life. Kardian would later credit this event as the springboard for his pursuit of training people in public safety practices, promoting changes to social safety dogmas, and redefining personal safety.

Kardian was appointed to the Westchester County Victims Assistance advisory board from 2008 to 2012, and currently lives in Westchester County, New York, with his wife.

== Career ==
=== Certifications ===
Kardian is a certified New York State and FBI defensive tactics instructor and served as the Chief Criminal Investigator with the New York Department of Instigations. He holds the rank of 3rd degree Black Belt in Gracie Jiu-Jitsu, a martial art which also honors Kardian with the title of professor. Kardian also has a black belt in Kyokushin Karate, is a Muay Thai Kick Boxing coach, and serves as Associate Instructor under world shoot fighting world champion and MMA coach Erik Paulson. He is a state-certified general defensive topics instructor, including T.A.S.E.R., chemical weapons, pepper spray, use of force, baton, and radar/laser certifications. Kardian worked at the Westchester County Police Academy as a senior Defensive Tactics Instructor from 1995 to 2007, teaching defensive tactics, interactive skills, and how to become an effective force supervisor, among other subjects.

=== Law Enforcement and Private Training ===
Kardian began training police officers on Defensive Tactics in 1980 when he was recruited by an instructor at the Conn Municipal Police Academy to train part-time Police Officers. Kardian has taught international, federal, state, county and local law enforcement officers across the United States and in Europe, where he has taught Jiu-Jitsu, certified instructors for women's self-defense, and set up law enforcement training for police officers in Ireland and England. His students have included members of the FBI, DEA, US Treasury Department, NY State Police, Army Rangers, Navy Seals, the DELTA force, London's Metropolitan Police, Ireland's Garda Siochana, and the Israeli Security Agency under the Prime Minister's Office (Shin Bet). He was invited by Lt. Colonel in the NYSP to lecture and teach the Executive Division of the Governors office for the State of New York, training the women in the executive division of the Governors office in personal safety and defense.

== Defend University ==
Kardian started Defend University in Phoenix, AZ in the early 1990s with his partner, Brad Parker. Parker was approached by a group of female survivors of assault (including sexual assault, domestic violence, and kidnapping) requesting self-defense training. He taught them martial arts techniques, but found the techniques were not effectively deployed by the women, so he began teaching them how to fight by tailoring techniques to the unique strengths of their gender against the weaknesses of male attackers, while utilizing Jiu-jutsu concepts of the ground as their safety position. Kardian joined soon after and Defend University was founded.

=== Women's Self Defense Institute ===
The Women's Self Defense Institute was developed under Defend University as a research and development group to provide research and training on cutting edge tactics and strategies for women's safety and self-defense, and also law enforcement safety and self-defense. To date, these programs have certified thousands of instructors, students and police officers in tactics, techniques and strategies that have and will keep them safe.

=== Less Than Lethal ===
Under Defend University, Kardian is the founder of the Less Than Lethal program, which teaches tactics and ground control for law enforcement with the stated goal of reducing injuries to both suspects and police officers during physical encounters. The program began in New York state, where Kardian worked with the Office of Public Safety, Department of Criminal Justice, evaluating and submitting changes in the way recruits and Defensive Tactics Instructors across the State of New York are trained and taught.

=== Campuspeak ===
From 2008 to 2012, Kardian lectured throughout United States on campus and women's safety at colleges and universities for CAMPUSPEAK. CAMPUSPEAK was founded in 1999 as an agency representing college speakers and has become the leading provider of professional speakers.

== Media ==
Kardian has served as a women's safety, security and law enforcement consultant for Inside Edition, Fox & Friends, Fox News (America's News Room), Fox News (Real Story) CNN, HLN, Nancy Grace, Dr. Drew, Jane Velez-Mitchell, HLN Morning Express, News Now, The Morning Show, CBS, NBC, ABC, The Meredith Vieira Show, Men's Journal, the New York Times, Cosmopolitan Magazine, Women's Day, All About You Magazine, Best Life Magazine, Real Simple Magazine, USA Today, the Wall Street Journal, The Associated Press, America Survival Guide, Details Magazine, Omega Life Systems Magazine, AARP Magazine and Sports Illustrated.. Through his media work Kardian has reached hundreds of thousands of women with his media safety segments including anti abduction, campus safety, home safety, safety devises for women, stalking, holiday safety, travel safety, car safety, nightclub safety, dating safety, domestic safety and more.

In 2003, 2004, and 2012, Kardian worked alongside investigative media teams with NBC and Inside Edition and lured 21 out of 21 women into compromising situations that, if he was real predator, would have compromised their safety, effectively using media to empower women with information and tactics that will help them avoid abduction, campus safety, and date rape drugs awareness.
