= Munich Digitization Center =

German digital library

- 48°08′52″N 11°34′51″E
- Location: München, Germany
- Type: Digital library
- Established: 1997

Collection
- Items collected: manuscripts, early prints, modern books, maps and photographic collections, etc.
- Size: 484,388 (March 2011)

Access and use
- Access requirements: Free online access

Other information
- Website: www.digitale-sammlungen.de

Munich Digitization Center (German: Das Münchener Digitalisierungszentrum; MDZ) is an institution dedicated to digitization, Online publication and the long-term archival preservation of the holdings of the Bavarian State Library and other cultural heritage institutions. It was founded in 1997 under the leadership of Mark Brantl. It operates as a unit of the Bavarian State Library.

== See also ==
- Books in Germany
