= The Love of Don Perlimplín and Belisa in the Garden =

Play written by Federico García Lorca

The Love of Don Perlimplín and Belisa in the Garden (Amor de Don Perlimplín con Belisa en su jardín) is a play by the 20th-century Spanish dramatist Federico García Lorca. It was written in 1928 and first performed in 1933. It bears the subtitle "An erotic lace-paper valentine in a prologue and three scenes" (Aleluya erotica en un prologo y tres escenas).

== Plot ==
The play tells the story of an elderly bachelor, Don Perlimplín, who is persuaded by his servant Marcolfa that he should marry on the grounds that she is getting too old and won't always be there to look after him. Don Perlimplín expresses doubts but agrees to marry the far younger and very unsuitable Belisa. Belisa accepts the match because her avaricious mother convinces her that Don Perlimplín's money will make her more attractive to other men. On their wedding night two duendes appear and draw a veil over the scene, explaining that some things should be left unseen. The next morning it appears that Don Perlimplín has been cuckolded by five different men who entered through the five windows of the bedchamber. His reaction is odd as he doesn't behave jealously but declares instead that he has discovered the true meaning of love. Belisa begins to receive graphic love letters from a mysterious man in a red cape with whom she falls in love and whom she agrees to meet in the garden of Don Perlimpín's house. She goes there at the appointed time but is met instead by Don Perlimplín, who announces that he will challenge his rival to a duel and runs offstage. The red-caped man staggers in mortally wounded, and when Belisa rushes to him she discovers that her mystery admirer has all along been Don Perlimplín, whose love letters Marcolfa delivered. In dying, Perlimplín is embraced by his wife for the first and last time. She realizes she has unwittingly fallen in love with her own elderly husband; in sacrificing his life, he carries her love to the grave, and bequeaths her the soul she conspicuously lacked when they were married.

== Music ==
Lorca, himself a composer, conceived this play with musical interludes (Scarlatti harpsichord sonatas) as well as songs on stage. The stylized construction of the piece has proved attractive as an operatic subject to numerous composers, among them Rieti (1949), Elston (1958), Maderna (1961), Fortner (1962), Olsen (1966), Goeyvaerts (1972), Belamarić (1974), Dreznin (1981), Susa (1984), Hoyer (1987), Morrill (1988), Vietri (1991), Coria (1992), Shapiro (1997), Edward Lambert (2018) and Biales (2002). There is also a ballet by Mompou and Montsalvatge (1956), a ballet by Luigi Nono (Der rote Mantel, 1954) and incidental music for the play by Billy Strayhorn (1953), Doyle (1988) as well as a chamber opera by the South African composer Phillip Vietri (1991).
