= List of operas by Pietro Alessandro Guglielmi =

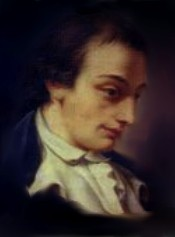
Pietro Alessandro Guglielmi

This is a complete list of operas by Pietro Alessandro Guglielmi (1728–1804).

Ninety-five works are listed below. This does not include a number of doubtful attributions and contributions to operas normally ascribed to other composers.

== Genres ==
Guglielmi composed 33 opere serie. However, he was better known for the style of his less formal works, writing 25 opere buffe (designated as commedia per musica), 25 drammi giocosi, six intermezzi, five farse or farsette, and one serenata.

Following the prevailing fashions, Guglielmi composed mainly three-act operas from the 1760s until the late 1780s, thereafter concentrating on two-act works.

== List ==
Title	Genre	Subdivisions	Libretto	Première date	Place, theatre
Lo solachianello 'mbroglione	dramma giocoso		Domenico Pignataro	winter 1757	Naples, Teatro dei Fiorentini
Il filosofo burlato	commedia per musica			winter 1758	Naples, Teatro dei Fiorentini
La ricca locandiera	intermezzo		Antonio Palomba	carnival 1759	Rome, Teatro Capranica
I capricci di una vedova	dramma giocoso			spring 1759	Naples, Teatro dei Fiorentini
La moglie imperiosa	commedia per musica	3 acts	Antonio Villani	autumn 1759	Naples, Teatro dei Fiorentini
I due soldati	dramma giocoso		Antonio Palomba	winter 1760	Naples, Teatro Nuovo
L'Ottavio	commedia per musica	3 acts	Gennaro Antonio Federico	winter 1760	Naples, Teatro Nuovo
Il finto cieco	dramma giocoso		Pietro Trinchera	summer 1761	Naples, Teatro dei Fiorentini
I cacciatori	farsetta		based on Li uccellatori by Carlo Goldoni	30 January 1762	Rome, Tordinona
La donna di tutti i caratteri	commedia per musica		Antonio Palomba	autumn 1762	Naples, Teatro dei Fiorentini
Don Ambrogio	intermezzo			winter 1762	Naples, Teatro dei Fiorentini
Tito Manlio	opera seria	3 acts	Gaetano Roccaforte	8 January 1763	Rome, Teatro Argentina
La francese brillante	commedia per musica	3 acts	Pasquale Mililotti	summer 1763	Naples, Teatro dei Fiorentini
Lo sposo di tre e marito di nessuna (with Pasquale Anfossi)	commedia per musica	3 acts	Antonio Palomba	autumn 1763	Naples, Teatro Nuovo
L'Olimpiade	opera seria	3 acts	Metastasio	4 November 1763	Naples, Teatro di San Carlo
Le contadine bizzarre	farsetta			1763	Rome, Teatro Capranica
Siroe re di Persia	opera seria	3 acts	Metastasio	5 September 1764	Florence, Teatro della Pergola
Li rivali placati	dramma giocoso	3 acts	Gaetano Martinelli	autumn 1764	Venice, Teatro San Moisè
Farnace	opera seria		Antonio Maria Lucchini	4 February 1765	Rome, Teatro Argentina
Tamerlano	opera seria	3 acts	Agostino Piovene	Ascension 1765	Venice, San Salvatore
L'impresa d'opera	dramma giocoso	3 acts	Bartolomeo Cavalieri	autumn 1765	Milan, Regio Ducal
Il ratto della sposa	dramma giocoso	3 acts	Gaetano Martinelli	autumn 1765	Venice, Teatro San Moisè
Adriano in Siria	opera seria	3 acts	Metastasio	26 December 1765	Venice, Teatro San Benedetto
Lo spirito di contradizione	dramma giocoso	3 acts	Gaetano Martinelli	carnival 1766	Venice, Teatro San Moisè
Sesostri	opera seria	3 acts	Pietro Pariati	7 May 1766	Venice, San Salvatore
Demofoonte	opera seria	3 acts	Metastasio	8 October 1766	Treviso, Teatro Onigo
La sposa fedele	dramma giocoso	3 acts	Pietro Chiari	26 December 1766	Venice, Teatro San Moisè
Antigono	opera seria	3 acts	Metastasio	January 1767	Milan, Regio Ducal
Il re pastore	opera seria	3 acts	Metastasio	Ascension 1767	Venice, Teatro San Benedetto
Ifigenia in Aulide	opera seria		Giovan Gualberto Bottarelli	16 January 1768	London, King's Theatre
I viaggiatori ridicoli tornati in Italia	dramma giocoso		Giovan Gualberto Bottarelli, after Carlo Goldoni	24 May 1768	London, King's Theatre
Alceste	opera seria	3 acts	Ranieri de' Calzabigi, revised by Giuseppe Parini	26 December 1768	Milan, Regio Ducal
Ruggiero	opera seria	5 acts	Caterino Mazzolà, after Ludovico Ariosto	3 May 1769	Venice, San Salvatore
Ezio	opera seria	3 acts	Metastasio	13 January 1770	London, King's Theatre
Il disertore	dramma giocoso	3 acts	Carlo Francesco Badini, after Michel-Jean Sedaine	19 May 1770	London, King's Theatre
L'amante che spende	dramma giocoso		Niccolò Tassi	autumn 1770	Venice, Teatro San Moisè
Le pazzie di Orlando	dramma giocoso	3 acts	Carlo Francesco Badini, after Ludovico Ariosto	23 February 1771	London, King's Theatre
Il carnevale di Venice, o sia La virtuosa	dramma giocoso		Carlo Francesco Badini	14 January 1772	London, King's Theatre
L'assemblea	dramma giocoso	2 acts	Giovanni Gualberto Bottarelli, based on La conversazione by Carlo Goldoni	24 March 1772	London, King's Theatre
Demetrio	opera seria	3 acts	Giovanni Gualberto Bottarelli, after Metastasio	3 June 1772	London, King's Theatre
Mirandolina	dramma giocoso	3 acts	Giovanni Bertati	carnival 1773	Venice, Teatro San Moisè
La contadina superba, ovver Il giocatore burlato	intermezzo			carnival 1774	Rome, Valle
Tamas Kouli-Kan nell'Indie	opera seria	3 acts	Vittorio Amedeo Cigna-Santi	16 September 1774	Florence, Teatro della Pergola
Gl'intrighi di Don Facilone	intermezzo	2 acts		carnival 1775	Rome, Valle
Merope	opera seria	3 acts	Apostolo Zeno	carnival 1775	Turin, Teatro Regio
Vologeso	opera seria	3 acts	Apostolo Zeno	26 December 1775	Milan, Regio Ducal
La Semiramide riconosciuta	opera seria	3 acts	Metastasio	12 August 1776	Naples, Teatro di San Carlo
Il matrimonio in contrasto	commedia per musica	3 acts	Giuseppe Palomba	summer 1776	Naples, Teatro dei Fiorentini
Artaserse	opera seria	3 acts	Metastasio	19 January 1777	Rome, Argentina
Ricimero	opera seria		based on Francesco Silvani's La fede tradita e vendicata	30 May 1777	Naples, Teatro di San Carlo
I fuorusciti	commedia per musica		Giuseppe Palomba	winter 1777	Naples, Teatro dei Fiorentini
Il raggiratore di poca fortuna	dramma giocoso		Giuseppe Palomba	1 August 1779	Naples, Teatro dei Fiorentini
La villanella ingentilita	commedia per musica	3 acts	Francesco Saverio Zini	8 November 1779	Naples, Teatro dei Fiorentini
Narcisso	intermezzo		Giuseppe Palomba	19 December 1779	Naples, Accademia di Dame e Cavalieri
La dama avventuriera	commedia per musica	3 acts	Giuseppe Palomba	spring 1780	Naples, Teatro dei Fiorentini
La serva padrona	dramma giocoso		Gennaro Antonio Federico	autumn 1780	Naples, Teatro dei Fiorentini
Le nozze in commedia	dramma giocoso	3 acts	Giuseppe Palomba	January 1781	Naples, Teatro dei Fiorentini
Diana amante	serenata		Luigi Serio, based on Metastasio's Endimione	28 September 1781	Naples, Accademia di Dame e Cavalieri
I Mietitori	commedia per musica	3 acts	Francesco Saverio Zini	20 October 1781	Naples, Teatro dei Fiorentini
La semplice ad arte	commedia per musica	2 acts	Giuseppe Palomba	12 May 1782	Naples, Teatro dei Fiorentini
La Quakera spiritosa	commedia per musica	2 acts	Giuseppe Palomba	summer 1783	Naples, Teatro dei Fiorentini
La donna amante di tutti, e fedele a nessuno	commedia per musica	3 acts	Giuseppe Palomba	autumn 1783	Naples, Teatro del Fondo
Le vicende d'amore	intermezzo	2 acts	Giovanni Battista Neri	carnival 1784	Rome, Valle
I finti amori	commedia per musica			summer 1784	Naples, Teatro dei Fiorentini
La finta zingara	farsa	1 act	Giovanni Battista Lorenzi	10 January 1785	Naples, Teatro dei Fiorentini
Le sventure fortunate	farsa		Giovanni Battista Lorenzi	10 January 1785	Naples, Teatro dei Fiorentini
La virtuosa in Mergellina	dramma giocoso	3 acts	Francesco Saverio Zini	summer 1785	Naples, Teatro Nuovo
Enea e Lavinia	opera seria	3 acts	Gaetano Sertor	4 November 1785	Naples, Teatro di San Carlo
L'inganno amoroso	commedia per musica	3 acts	Giuseppe Palomba	12 June 1786	Naples, Teatro Nuovo
Le astuzie villane	commedia per musica	3 acts	Giuseppe Palomba	summer 1786	Naples, Teatro dei Fiorentini
Lo scoprimento inaspettato	dramma giocoso	3 acts	Vincenzo de Stefano	carnival 1787	Naples, Teatro Nuovo
Laconte	opera seria		Giuseppe Pagliuca	30 May 1787	Naples, Teatro di San Carlo
La pastorella nobile	commedia per musica	2 acts	Francesco Saverio Zini	15 or 19 April 1788	Naples, Teatro del Fondo
Arsace	opera seria	3 acts	Il Medonte re d'Epiro by Giovanni de Gamerra	26 December 1788	Venice, Teatro San Benedetto
Rinaldo	opera seria	2 acts	Giuseppe Maria Foppa, after Torquato Tasso	28 January 1789	Venice, Teatro San Benedetto
Ademira	opera seria	3 acts	Ferdinando Moretti	30 May 1789	Naples, Teatro di San Carlo
Gl'inganni delusi	commedia per musica	2 acts	Giuseppe Palomba	13 June 1789	Naples, Teatro del Fondo
La bella pescatrice	commedia per musica	2 acts	Francesco Saverio Zini	October 1789	Naples, Teatro Nuovo
Alessandro nell'Indie	opera seria	3 acts	Metastasio	4 November 1789	Naples, Teatro di San Carlo
La serva innamorata	dramma giocoso	2 acts	Giuseppe Palomba	July 1790	Naples, Teatro dei Fiorentini
L'azzardo	commedia per musica	2 acts		9 October 1790	Naples, Teatro del Fondo
Le false apparenze	commedia per musica		Giuseppe Palomba	spring 1791	Naples, Teatro dei Fiorentini
La sposa contrastata	commedia per musica	2 acts	Francesco Saverio Zini	autumn 1791	Naples, Teatro del Fondo
Il poeta di campagna	commedia per musica	2 acts	Francesco Saverio Zini	spring 1792	Naples, Teatro Nuovo
Amor tra le vendemmie	commedia per musica	2 acts	Giuseppe Palomba	autumn 1792	Naples, Teatro Nuovo
La lanterna di Diogene	dramma giocoso	2 acts	Angelo Anelli, after Giuseppe Palomba	autumn 1793	Venice, San Samuele
Gli amanti della dote	farsa	1 act	Francesco Saverio Zini L'ultima che si perde è la speranza	carnival 1794	Lisbon, San Carlos
Admeto	opera seria		Giuseppe Palomba	5 October 1794	Naples, Teatro del Fondo
La pupilla scaltra	dramma giocoso	2 acts	Giuseppe Palomba	8 January 1795	Venice, Teatro San Benedetto
Il trionfo di Camilla	opera seria	2 acts	after Silvio Stampiglia	30 May 1795	Naples, Teatro di San Carlo
La Griselda	opera seria		Gaetano Sertor	1796	Florence
La morte di Cleopatra	opera seria	2 acts	Antonio Simone Sografi	22 June 1796	Naples, Teatro di San Carlo
L'amore in villa	dramma giocoso	2 acts	Giuseppe Petrosellini	1797	Rome, Casa di Sforza Cesarini
Ippolito	opera seria		Giuseppe Petrosellini	4 November 1798	Naples, Teatro di San Carlo
Siface e Sofonisba	opera seria	2 acts	Andrea Leone Tottola	30 May 1802	Naples, Teatro di San Carlo
