= Sophonisba (disambiguation) =

Sophonisba (fl. 203 BC) was a Carthaginian noblewoman.

Sophonisba or Sofonisba may also refer to:

== Arts and entertainment ==
- The Wonder of Women, or the Tragedy of Sophonisba, a 1606 tragedy by John Marston
- Sophonisba (Lee play), a 1675 tragedy by Nathaniel Lee
- Sophonisba (Thomson play), a 1730 tragedy by James Thomson
- Sophonisbe (tragedy), by Voltaire, 1770
- Sophonisbe, a 1663 dramatic work by Pierre Corneille
- Sofonisba (Mantegna), a 15th-century painting in the Exemplary Women of Antiquity set by Andrea Mantegna
- Sofonisba, a 1762 opera by Tommaso Traetta

== People ==
- Sophonisba (given name)
- Sofonisba Anguissola (c. 1532 – 1625), Italian Renaissance painter
- Sophonisba Angusciola Peale (1786–1859), American ornithologist and artist
- Sophonisba Breckinridge (1866–1948), American activist and Progressive Era social reformer
