= Louis d'Auvigny =

Louis-Aimé d'Auvigny (Note: His name was also recorded as: Dauvigny and D’Auvigne, D’Auvigni, D’auvigny, d’Avigny, Dauvigni, Davigni, Davigny, Douigny, Douvigny, Dovigny, Dovini, Dovinié, Dowini, Dowinni; and in Poland he was given Polish first name Ludwik.) (about 1738, in Paris – after 1795, in Tulchyn, Poland, now Ukraine) was an 18th-century French dancer, ballet master, choreographer, and dance teacher.

== Family ==
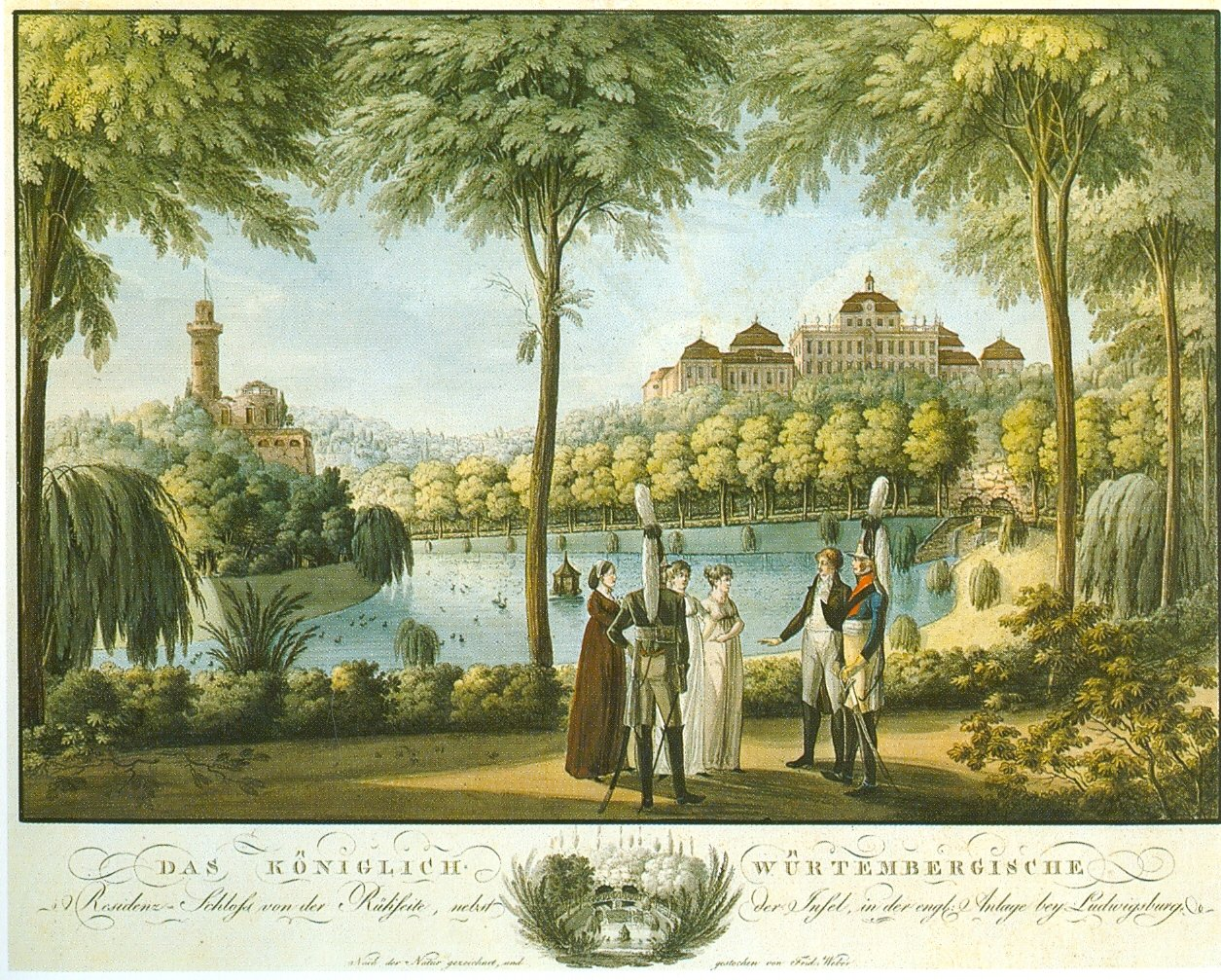
Ludwigsburg Palace, where Louis d'Auvigny worked as dancer, dance teacher and ballet master in 1767-1771 (copperplate: Friedrich Weber, about 1810)

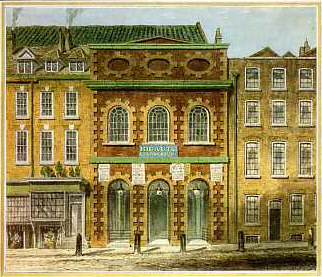
King's Theatre in the Haymarket, where Louis d'Auvigny worked as ballet master in 1772/1773 (watercolour: William Capon, 1783)

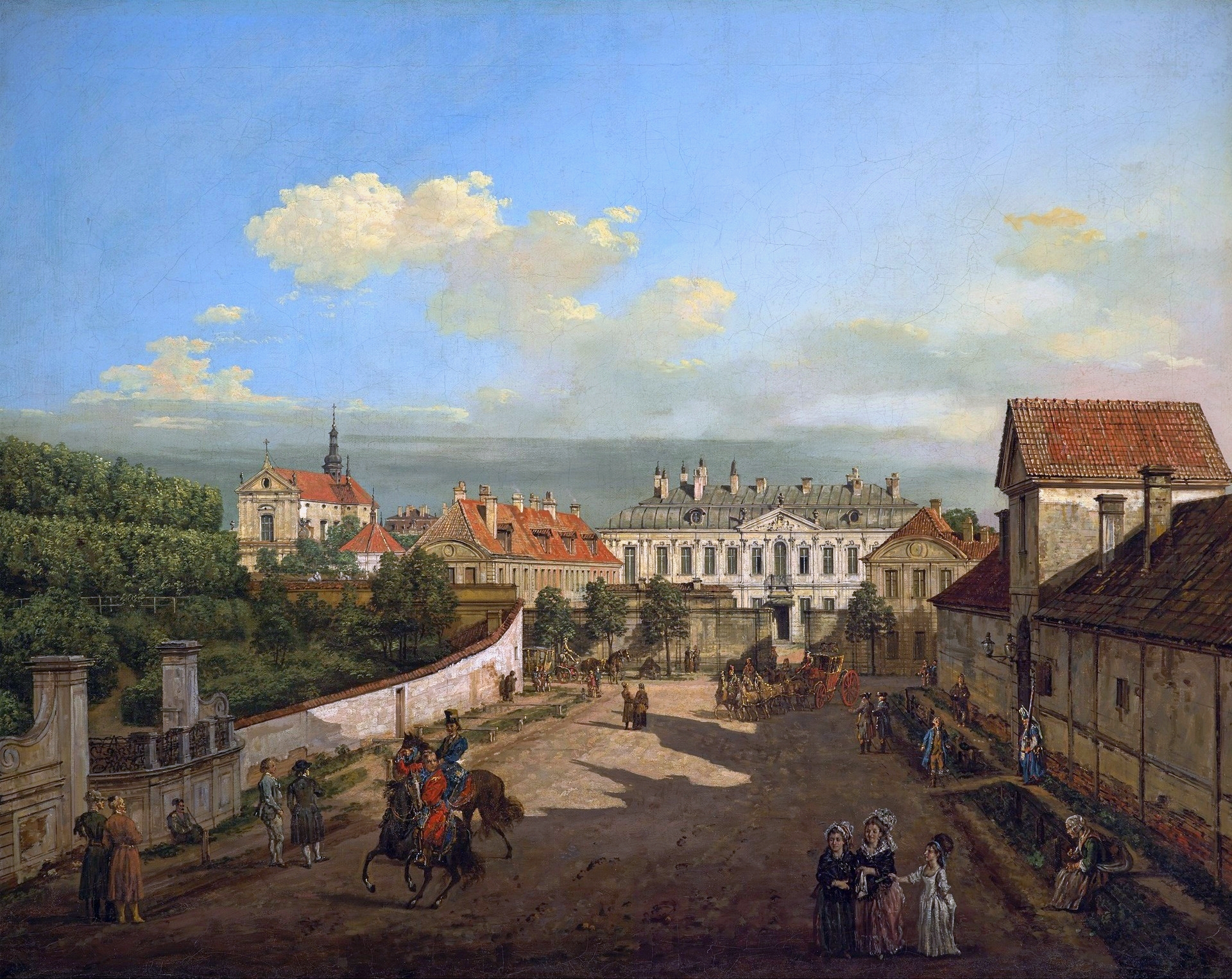
The Blue Palace in Warsaw, where Louis d'Auvigny lived and worked since 1774 as a courtier and dance teacher of the children of prince Adam Kazimierz Czartoryski (painting: Bernardo Bellotto called Canaletto, 1779)

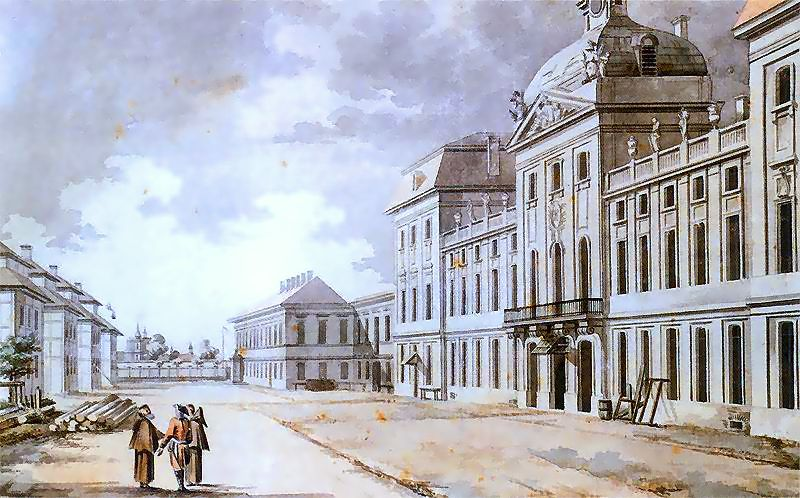
Académie du Corps des Cadets in Warsaw, where Louis d'Auvigny taught the dance to Polish cadets in 1774-1794 (watercolor: Zygmunt Vogel, 1785)

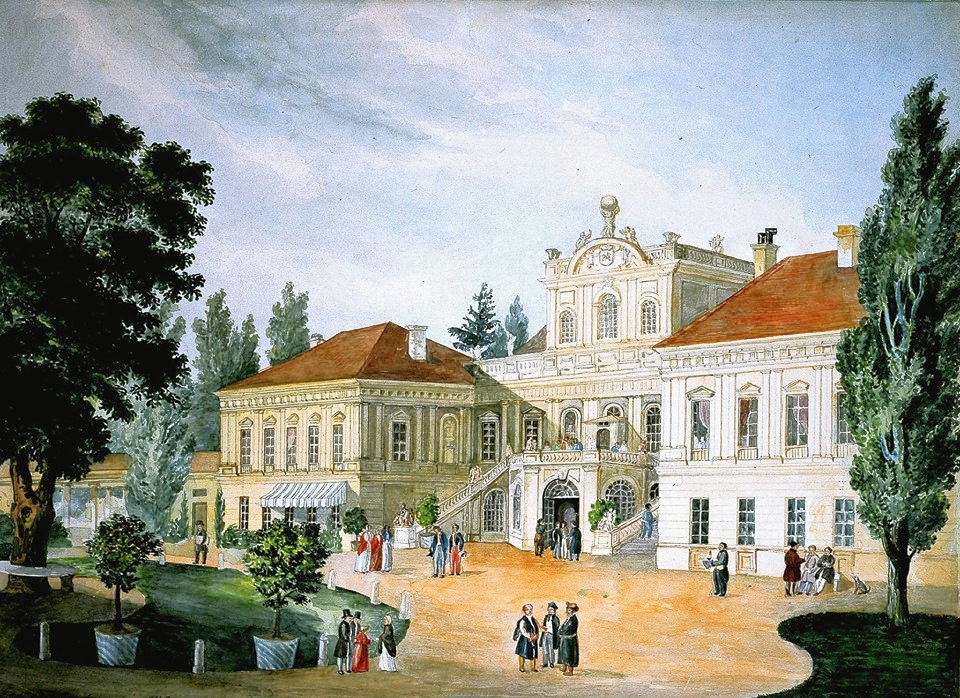
Czartoryski Palace in Puławy, where Louis d'Auvigny worked sometimes in 1784-1791 (watercolor: Konstanty Czartoryski, 1842)

D'Auvigny was probably the son of a writer and historian Aymé-Jean Chabaille d'Auvigny de Morinval, step brother of dancer and dance teacher Nicolas-François-Hyacinthe Dubus, known by his stage name Hyacinthe, and of the comic actors Gabriel-Éléonor-Hervé Dubus, whose stage name was Soli (Sauly), and Pierre-Louis Dubus, whose stage name was Préville. His mother was their sister, Louise-Élisabeth Dubus (marriage 1737).

In Stuttgart, he married dancer Marie Claudine Toscani (1746–1768) on 6 March 1764. She was the daughter of Italian comedians Giovanni Battista Toscani and Isabella Gafforia.

== Artistic career ==
After making his debut in the ballet of the Comédie-Italienne in 1753 and of the Comédie-Française in 1755 (two years after Préville), D'Auvigny spent some years in Lyon where he danced with Jean-Georges Noverre. In 1760, Noverre called him to the court of Stuttgart and gradually entrusted him with the responsibility of ballet.

When Noverre left in 1767, D'Auvigny was appointed ballet master and kept this position until Easter 1771. In 1770, he set among others the ballets of Calliroe, tragédie en musique by Antonio Sacchini presented at the theatre of Ludwigsburg Palace. In July 1772, he danced in Paris. In the winter and spring 1772/1773 he was a ballet master at the King's Theater on Haymarket in London.

== Choreographic works ==
In Palace Theater, Ludwigsburg

- 1768: Three ballets, music by Florian Johann Deller (in Niccolo Jommelli's Fetonte)
- 1768: Il matrimonio improviso, music by Florian Johann Deller (in Niccolo Jommelli's La schiava liberata)
- 1768: Le astuzie della fata Urgela, music by Florian Johann Deller (in Niccolo Jommelli's La schiava liberata)
- 1770: Ballo allegorico, music by Florian Johann Deller (in Antonio Sacchini's Calliroe)

In Castle Solitude

- 1770: La constance, music by Florian Johann Deller (in Antonio Beroni's L’amore in musica)
- 1770: Ballo polacco, music by Florian Johann Deller (in Antonio Beroni's L’amore in musica)

In King's Theatre in the Haymarket, London

- 1773: Grand Serious Ballet in Antonio Sacchini's Il Cid
- 1773: Grand Chaconne in Antonio Sacchini's Il Cid
- 1773: Pastoral Dance in Antonio Sacchini's Il Cid
- 1773: L’Isle désert in Antonio Sacchini's Il Cid
- 1773: Apollo and Venus in Gaetano Pugnani's Apollo et Issea
- 1773: La Fête du Village in Gaetano Pugnani's Apollo et Issea
- 1773: Les Sauvages in Gaetano Pugnani's Apollo et Issea
- 1773: Les Tartares in Antonio Sacchini's Tamerlano
- 1773: Grand Ballet in Christoph Willibald Gluck's Orfeo ed Euridice

== Dancing-master in Poland ==
In December 1773, he danced at the Royal Opera of Versailles, There he met the Polish prince Adam Kazimierz Czartoryski and his wife Izabela, who offered him a job in Poland. He became a dance teacher at Warsaw in Nobles' Academy of the Corps of Cadets (1774–1794) and a private teacher of the children of the Czartoryski princes in their residences in Warsaw (in the Blue Palace), in Powązki near Warsaw (Izabela Czartoryska's summer residence, modeled on Marie Antoinette's Hameau de la Reine) and sometimes at the Czartoryski Palace in Puławy. From 1795, he worked as a dance teacher in the residence of count Stanisław Szczęsny Potocki in Tulchyn.

D'Auvigny's death belongs to Julian Ursyn Niemcewicz's pen: "already advanced in years, a resident of Tulchyn, he took a young wife, and died on his wedding night – a harsh lesson", Niemcewicz comments, "for old men".

He was the father of painter-miniaturist Charles (Carl, Karol) d'Auvigny (1 September 1765, Ludwigsburg – 4 February 1830, Warsaw).

== See also ==
- Troupe of the Comédie-Française in 1755
