= António Leal Moreira =

António Leal Moreira (30 June 1758 – 26 November 1819) was a Portuguese Classical composer and organist. He composed a large number of operas, most of which were premiered in Lisbon; much of the rest of his output is sacred, though he composed a handful of symphonies as well. One of his works, Sinfonia para a Real Basílica de Mafra (Symphony for the Royal Basilica of Mafra), is an organ symphony composed specifically for the 6 organs of Mafra National Palace's Basilica.

== Biography ==
Born in Abrantes in Portugal, on 30 June 1766 Moreira entered the Seminary of the Patriarchal of Lisbon, where he was student of João de Sousa Carvalho. In 1775 he became assistant to his teacher and organist. In 1787 he was appointed chapel master. On 19 May 1777, he performed his first sacred work, the Mass of the Holy Spirit, which was sung during the acclamation of Queen Maria I of Portugal.

On 8 August 1777, he was admitted as a member of the union of musicians of Lisbon, the Brotherhood of Santa Cecilia. Most of his sacred music was composed for the Royal Chapel and from 1782 he began to write serenades, which were played in the palaces of Queluz and Ajuda .

In 1790 he was appointed musical director of the Theatre of the Street of the Counts, which was presenting Italian operas. Three years later at the palace, the drama "Il Natale Augusto" opened in Lisbon. The production was supported by the financier, Anselmo José da Cruz Sobral. Among the various singers who participated was the Portuguese mezzo-soprano Luísa Todi .

In 1793, Moreira became the first musical director of the new São Carlos Theatre, where his work was represented with a Portuguese text of the "Revenge of the Gypsy" (1794). In 1799 he left the direction of the São Carlos to Marcos Portugal and Francesco Federici. The following year he contributed to the production "pasticcio" Il disertore francese, which was staged at the Carignano Theatre in Turin and the La Scala Theatre in Milan .

== Artist considerations ==
His theatrical and sacred works were strongly influenced by the style of Giovanni Paisiello and Domenico Cimarosa. After António Teixeira, he was the first to compose opera using text written in Portuguese, although most of his works are in Italian.

== Compositions ==
=== Opera ===
- Bireno ed Olimpia (serenade, libretto by Gaetano Martinelli, 1782, Lisbon)
- Siface and Sofonisba (drama for sung music, libretto by Gaetano Martinelli, 1783, Lisbon)
- L'imenei of Delphi (allegorical lyric drama, libretto by Gaetano Martinelli, 1785, Lisbon)
- Ascanio in Alba (drama for sung music, libretto by Claudio Nicola Stampa, 1785, Lisbon)
- Artemisia, regina de Caria (drama for sung music, libretto by Gaetano Martinelli, 1787, Lisbon)
- Gli eroi spartani (drama for music, libretto by Gaetano Martinelli, 1787, Lisbon)
- Gli affetti of the Lusitanian genius (drama for sung music, libretto by Gaetano Martinelli, 1789, Lisbon)
- Il puro omaggio (drama for music, libretto by Gaetano Martinelli, 1791, Lisbon)
- Il natale augusto (drama for music, libretto by Gaetano Martinelli, 1793, Lisbon)
- The saloia enamorada, or The remedy is to marry (farce, libreto of D. Caldas Barbosa, 1793, Lisbon)
- The revenge of the gypsy (joco-serious drama, libretto by D. Caldas Barbosa, 1793, Lisbon)
- L'eroina lusitana (drama for music, libretto by Gaetano Martinelli, 1795, Lisbon)
- Musiche ne Il disertore francese ( opera buffa, 1800, Turin)
- Arie ne Il serraglio d'Osmano by Giuseppe Gazzaniga

=== Other works ===
- Ester (oratory, libretto by Gaetano Martinelli, 1786, Lisbon)
- 5 votives
- 4 masses
- 2 magnificats
- 11 responsories
- Several psalms
- Other minor sacred works
- Symphony in D major per 2 Orchestras (1793)
- Symphony in G major (1803)
- Symphony in D Major (1805)
- Symphony for 6 organs
