= Vologeso =

Libretto by Apostolo Zeno

Il Vologeso is the title of several operas, based on the same story as Apostolo Zeno's Lucio Vero, but in a later version (1700), which had first been set to music as Vologeso, re de' Parti by Rinaldo di Capua in 1739 to a libretto by Guido Eustachio Luccarelli.

The best-known version, and the only one to be revived and recorded in the modern era, is Il Vologeso (1766), an opera by Niccolò Jommelli. The same libretto was also set by many other composers, including Antonio Sacchini and Davide Perez. It was set at least fifteen times under the title Lucio Vero and at least five under the title Il Vologeso. It was also set by Ariosti under the title Lucio Vero, imperator di Roma (1727), by Reinhard Keiser under the title Lucius Verus (1728) and by Davide Perez under the title Berenice (1762). Following contemporary tastes, the librettos were altered in the course of the century to shorten recitatives and simplify the plot.

== Plot ==
The plot concerns king Vologeso (based on Vologases IV of Parthia, 148–191) who is deposed by Lucio Vero (loosely based on Lucius Verus, 130–169) and restored by another Roman, Flavio (created for the story by Zeno).
