= Florian Johann Deller =

Austrian composer and violinist

Florian Johann Deller (bapt. 2 May 1729 in Drosendorf, Lower Austria – 19 September 1773 in Munich) was an Austrian composer and violinist.

== Life ==
In 1751 he was a violinist at the court orchestra in Stuttgart. There he studied with Niccolo Jommelli. Later he became assistant to the ballet master Jean Georges Noverre and composed operas and ballets. In 1769 he was appointed Concertmaster and Hofcompositeur. In 1771 he moved to Vienna. Deller died in 1773 in the monastery of the Brothers of Mercy in Munich.

His compositional output consists mostly of operas, ballet music, sonatas and minuets. He enjoyed in his lifetime a high reputation as a composer. His works have been greatly appreciated, by, among others Mozart and Christian Friedrich Daniel Schubart. Many of his works are considered lost.

== Works ==
- Operas
  - Il tamburo notturno, 1765
  - Le Contese per amore, 1770
  - Il Maestro di Capella, 1771
  - La contadina nelle corte
  - 5 other Comic Operas
- Ballets
  - Admète et Alceste (Noverre), Stuttgart, 1761
  - La mort d'Hercule (Noverre), Stuttgart, 1762
  - Orfée et Euridice (Noverre), Stuttgart, 1763
  - Der Sieg des Neptun (Noverre), Stuttgart, 1763
  - Apollon et Daphne (Lauchery), Kassel, 1764
  - Ballo di Alessandro (Noverre), Stuttgart, 1765
  - Pan et Syrinx (Lauchery), Kassel, 1766
  - Le feste d'Imeneo (Noverre), Stuttgart, 1766
  - Enée et Lavinie (Noverre), Stuttgart 1761-1766
  - Pigmalion ou La statuë animée (Lauchery), Kassel, 1767
  - Titon et l'Aurore (Lauchery), Kassel, 1767
  - La pauvre (D'Auvigny) to opera Fetonte by Niccolo Jommelli, Ludwigsburg, 1768
  - Il matrimonio improvviso (D'Auvigny) to opera La schiava liberata by Niccolo Jommelli, Ludwigsburg, 1768
  - Le astuzie della fata Urgela (D'Auvigny) to opera La schiava liberata by Niccolo Jommelli, Ludwigsburg, 1768
  - Telephe et Isménie ou La mort d'Eurite, Kassel, 1768
  - Hylas et Eglée, ou La fête d'amour (Lauchery), Kassel, 1769
  - Le ballet allégorique (D'Auvigny) to opera Calliroe by Antonio Sacchini, Ludwigsburg, 1770
  - La constance (D'Auvigny) to opera L’amore in musica by Antonio Boroni, Solitude, 1770
  - Le ballet polonois (D'Auvigny) to opera L’amore in musica by Antonio Boroni, Solitude, 1770
  - L'embarquement pour Cythère, ou Le triomphe de Venus, Kassel, 1770
  - Le rival imaginaire, Mannheim, 1774;
  - Die Leiden des jungen Werther (Der junge Werther), Pressburg, 1777
  - La mariée de village, Kassel, 1784;
  - 1 without title
- Instrumental
  - 6 Sonatas, 2 vn, vc, hpd, London, 1780
  - Chaconne for pf
  - 4 symphonies
  - 2 flute concertos

== Sources ==
- Rudolf Krauss: Das Stuttgarter Hoftheater von den ältesten Zeiten bis zur Gegenwart (1908)
