= Il Vologeso (Jommelli) =

1766 opera by Niccolò Jommelli

Il Vologeso is a 1766 opera by Niccolò Jommelli based on the libretto of the same name by Metastasio based on the story of the Parthian king Vologases IV. The opera was performed for the birthday, February 11, of Charles Eugene, Duke of Württemberg, at the court theatre at Ludwigsburg, the Duke's residence near Stuttgart.

== Plot ==
Vologeso is a twice-over reworking of Lucio Vero a libretto by Apostolo Zeno set by Carlo Pollarolo for Venice in 1700. That libretto was revised for a production by Guido Lucarelli of Rinaldo di Capua’s setting of 1739. Jommelli's librettist Mattia Verazi then further revised the 1739 text.

Set in Ephesus circa 164 A.D., the opera centres on a love triangle between Berenice Queen of Armenia, the victorious Roman general Lucio Vero, and Vologeso, the defeated king of the Parthians.

== Cast ==
- Vologeso - King of the Parthians (male alto)
- Lucio Vero - Roman general (tenor)
- Berenice - Queen of Armenia (soprano) captured by Lucio
- Aniceto - minister of Lucio.
- Lucilla - Lucio Vero’s betrothed, love interest of Aniceto (mezzo)
- Flavio - ambassador from Lucio Vero’s co-emperor, Marcus Aurelius.

== Recordings ==
- Il Vologeso - Vologeso - Jörg Waschinski, male soprano Lucio Vero - Lothat Odinius, tenor Berenice - Gabriele Rossmanith, soprano Lucilla - Helene Schneiderman, mezzo-soprano Aniceto - Daniel Taylor, counter-tenor Flavio - Mechthild Bach, soprano Stuttgart Chamber Orchestra, Frieder Bernius Orfeo C420983F 3CDs Recorded December 1997
- Il Vologeso. Sebastian Kohlhepp, Sophie Marilley, Ana Durlovski, Helene Schneiderman, Staatsorchester Stuttgart, Gabriele Ferro. Naxos Blu-Ray 2018
- Il Vologeso. Stuart Jackson, Jennifer France, Gemma Summerfield, Angela Simkin, Tom Verney, Rachel Kelly The Mozartists Ian Page
