= Sophonisba (given name) =

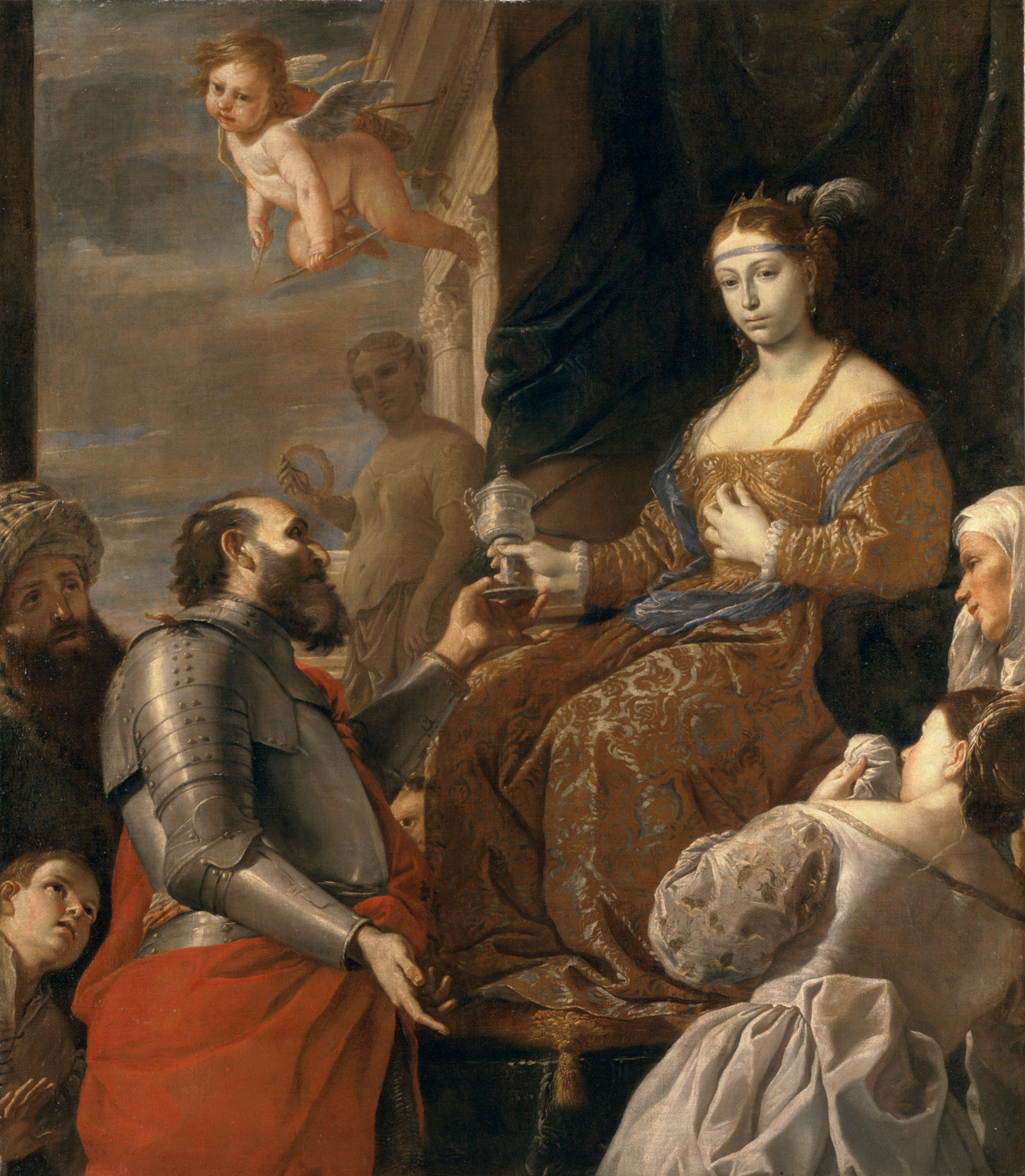
- The Death of Sophonisba by Mattia Preti.
- Pronunciation: English: /soʊfoʊˈniːzbɑː/; English: /soʊfəˈnɪzbə/
- Gender: Feminine
- Language: Punic

Origin
- Meaning: "Ba’al conceals”

Other names
- Nicknames: Nisba, Sophie, Sophy, Sopy

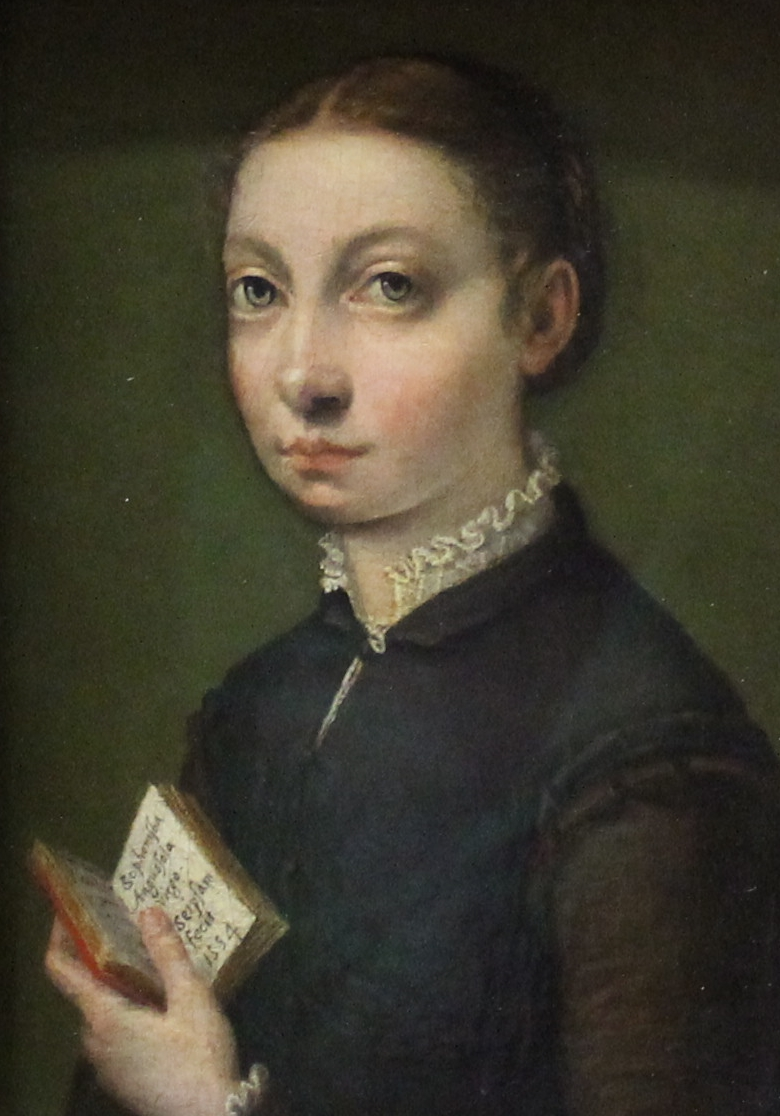
Italian Renaissance painter Sofonisba Anguissola (1532–1625).

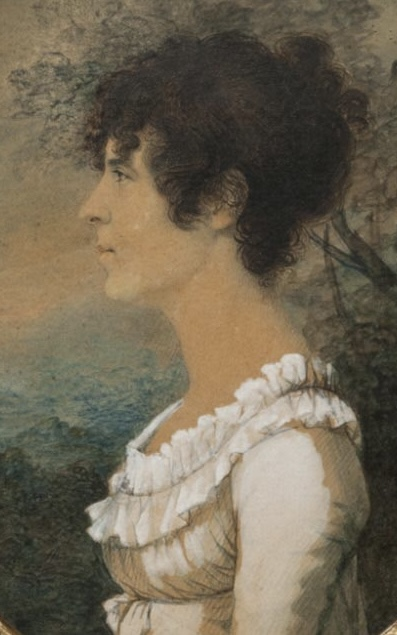
American ornithologist and artist Sophonisba Angusciola Peale (1786–1859), pictured in 1805.

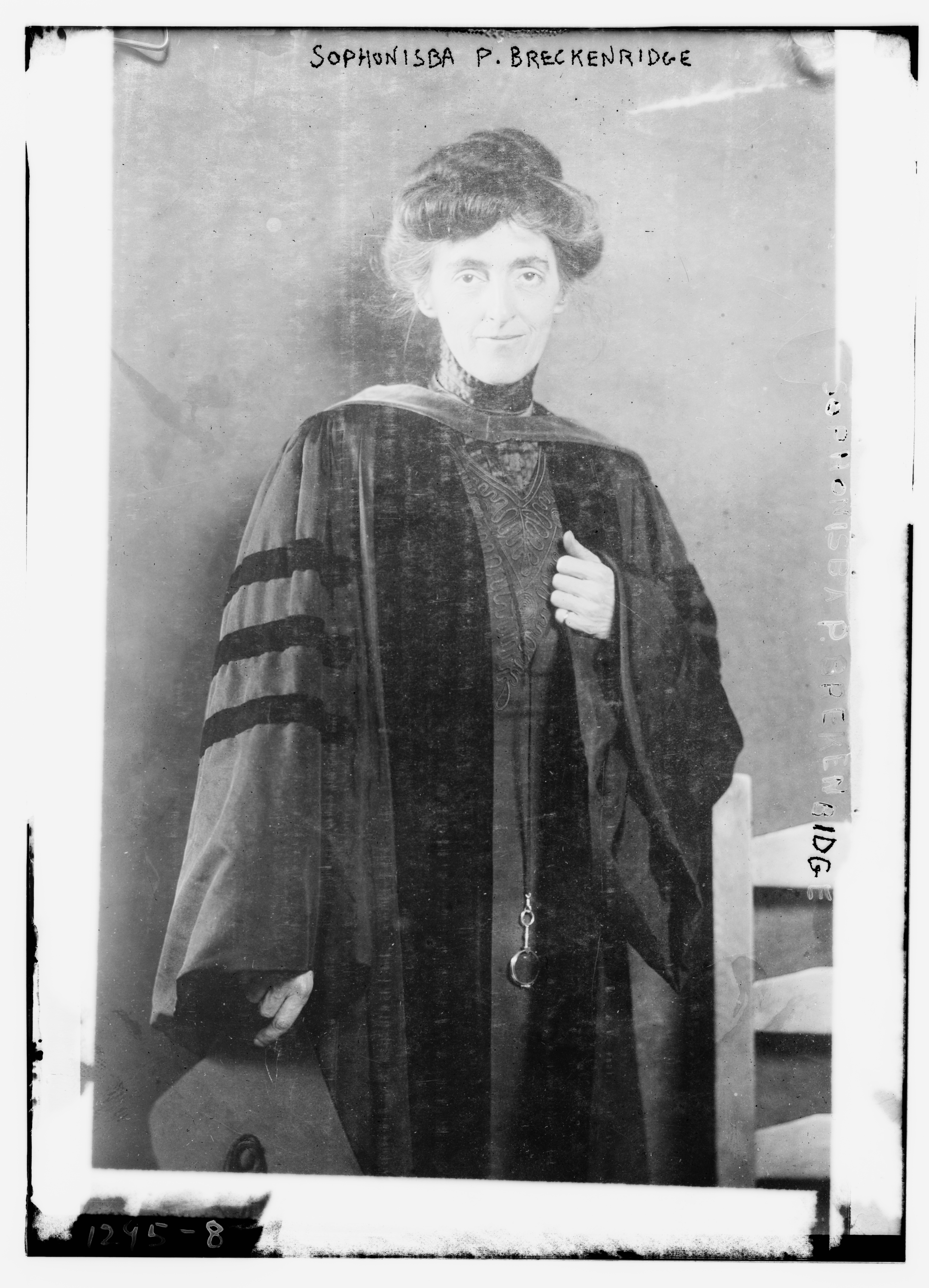
Sophonisba Breckinridge (1866–1948), American activist.

Sophonisba or Sofonisba is a rare feminine given name usually given in reference to Sophonisba, a Carthaginian noblewoman who lived during the Second Punic War and poisoned herself rather than be humiliated in a Roman triumph. The Punic name 𐤑𐤐𐤍𐤁𐤏𐤋 (Ṣap̄anbaʿal) likely means "Ba’al conceals". Sofonisba, Sophonisba, or Sophonisbe are Latinized versions of the name used in later literary sources. Sophonisbe is a French version; Sofonisba is an Italian version of the name. Hypocorisms in use in the 19th century included Nisba and Sopy. Variants of Sophia including Sophie and Sophy have also been used as diminutives of Sophonisba.

The name, though always uncommon, has been borne by women of distinction. The Italian Renaissance painter Sofonisba Anguissola, like several of her siblings, was named after an ancient Carthaginian historical character. More than two centuries later, American ornithologist and artist Sophonisba Angusciola Peale was named after Anguissola. American illustrator, painter, and printmaker Ella Sophonisba Hergesheimer was a descendant of the Peale family and was named in honor of her relative. American Sophonisba Breckinridge was a noted activist, Progressive Era social reformer, social scientist and innovator in higher education. Breckinridge was named after her grandmother, Ann Sophonisba Preston Breckinridge (1803–1844), who was from a prominent family in Virginia. Names from classical antiquity such as Sophonisba were in greater use among some prominent families in the Southern United States during the 1700s and 1800s than they were elsewhere.

== Women named Sophonisba ==
- Sophonisba Breckinridge (1866–1948), American activist, Progressive Era social reformer, social scientist and innovator in higher education
- Sophonisba Angusciola Peale (1786–1859), American ornithologist and artist

== As middle name ==
- Ella Sophonisba Hergesheimer (1873–1943), American illustrator, painter, and printmaker

== Women named Sofonisba ==
- Sofonisba Anguissola (1532–1625), Italian Renaissance painter

== Arts and entertainment ==
- The Wonder of Women, or the Tragedy of Sophonisba, a 1606 tragedy by John Marston
- Sophonisba (Lee play), a 1675 tragedy by Nathaniel Lee
- Sophonisba (Thomson play), a 1730 tragedy by James Thomson
- Sophonisbe (tragedy), by Voltaire, 1770
- Sophonisbe, a 1663 dramatic work by Pierre Corneille
- Sofonisba (Mantegna), a 15th-century painting in the Exemplary Women of Antiquity set by Andrea Mantegna
- Sofonisba, a 1762 opera by Tommaso Traetta
- Sophonisba, a character in the 1922 heroic high fantasy novel The Worm Ouroboros by E. R. Eddison
