= Antonio Boroni =

Italian composer

Antonio Boroni, sometimes spelled Baroni, Borroni, Buroni, or Burroni, (Rome, 1738 - Rome, 21 December 1792) was an Italian composer.

== Operas ==
- Demofoonte (dramma per musica, libretto di Pietro Metastasio, 1761, Senigallia)
- La moda (dramma giocoso, libretto di Pietro Cipretti, 1761, Torino)
- L'amore in musica (dramma giocoso, libretto di Carlo Goldoni da una commedia di F. Griselini, 1763, Venezia) - revisione del materiale a cura di Ciro Roberto Passilongo
- La pupilla rapita (dramma giocoso, 1763, Venezia)
- Sofonisba (dramma per musica, libretto di Mattia Verazi, 1764, Venezia)
- Siroe, re di Persia (dramma per musica, libretto di Pietro Metastasio, 1764, Venezia)
- Le villeggiatrice ridicole (dramma comico, libretto di A. G. Bianchi, 1765, Venezia)
- La notte critica (dramma giocoso, libretto di Carlo Goldoni, 1766, Venezia)
- Artaserse (dramma per musica, libretto di Pietro Metastasio, 1767, Praga)
- Didone (dramma per musica, libretto di Pietro Metastasio, 1768, Praga)
- Il carnevale (dramma giocoso, libretto di Pietro Chiari, 1769, Dresden)
- Le orfane svizzere (dramma giocoso, libretto di Pietro Chiari, 1770, Venezia)
- Le contadine furlane (dramma giocoso, libretto di Pietro Chiari, 1771, Venezia)
- La gara de' numi nel tempio d'Apollo (1772, Stoccarda)
- L'amour fraternel (opéra comiques, 1774-1775, Stoccarda)
- Le déserteur (opéra comiques, 1774-1775, Stoccarda)
- Zémire et Azor (opéra comiques, 1774-1775, Stoccarda)
- L'isola disabitata (intermezzo, libretto di Pietro Metastasio, 1775, Stoccarda)
- L'orfana perseguita (dramma giocoso, libretto di Pietro Chiari, 1777, Vienna)
- Enea nel Lazio (dramma per musica, libretto di Vittorio Amedeo Cigna-Santi, 1778, Roma)
