= Gaetano Martinelli =

Italian librettist

Gaetano Martinelli (? – 1802) was an Italian librettist active in the court theatres of Charles Eugene, Duke of Württemberg from 1766 to 1769 and in Lisbon as the court poet to Joseph I of Portugal and his daughter Maria I from 1769 until his death in 1802. He was one of a group of reforming Italian librettists which also included Calzabigi, Verazi, and Migliavacca, who moved away from the traditional Metastasian plot structures that had dominated opera during the first half of the 18th century. The majority of his early libretti were for comic (opera buffa) or semi-comic (dramma giocoso) operas.

Martinelli was described on his early libretti as "Romano" (Roman) but nothing is known of the exact date and place of his birth or of his parentage and early life. His first appearance as a librettist was at the Teatro San Moisè in Venice, where between 1764 and 1766 he produced the libretti for four successful opere buffe. The first three of these—Li rivali placati, Il ratto della sposa, and Lo spirito di contradizione—were composed by Pietro Alessandro Guglielmi. The fourth, Le nozze disturbate, was composed by the young Giovanni Paisiello. Martineli wrote the libretto to the opera Everardo II, re di Lituania (Everardo II, King of Lithuania) by the Portuguese composer João de Sousa Carvalho which had never been performed since its original premiere in 1782 until 2013 when it was newly discovered by Lithuanian-Spanish conductor Alexis Soriano at a royal archive in Spain.
