= Agathocles =

Agathocles (Greek: Ἀγαθοκλῆς) is a Greek name. The most famous person called Agathocles was Agathocles of Syracuse, the tyrant of Syracuse. The name is derived from Ancient Greek: ἀγαθός, romanized: agathos, lit. 'good' and Ancient Greek: κλέος, romanized: kleos, lit. 'glory'.

Other people named Agathocles include:

- Agathocles, a sophist, teacher of Damon
- Agathocles (writers), was the name of a number of ancient writers, including an ancient historian referred to by Pliny and Cicero
- Agathocles of Pella, father of Lysimachus
- Agathocles, one of the sons of Agathocles of Syracuse from his first marriage
- Agathocles (son of Lysimachus), the son and heir of Lysimachus
- Agathocles, grandson of Agathocles of Syracuse with his third wife Theoxena of Syracuse
- Agathocles of Egypt, son of the above named Agathocles; guardian of Ptolemy V Epiphanes and brother of Agathoclea, mistress of Ptolemy IV Philopator
- Agathocles of Bactria, an Indo-Greek king who ruled about 185 BC
- Agathocles of Samos, a Greek writer. He wrote at least one book, which was called Commonwealth of Pessinus and mentioned by Pseudo-Plutarch

== See also ==
- Agathocle, a play by Voltaire
- Agafokliya, a related Russian feminine first name
