= List of operas by Tommaso Traetta =

This is a list of operas by Tommaso Traetta (1727–1779).

Traetta wrote 25 opere serie, 5 opere buffe, 4 drammi giocosi, 2 azioni teatrali and 1 each of the following: azione drammatica, burletta, dramma eroicomico, pastorale, semiseria e bernesca, serenata, and tragedia.

== List ==
Title	Genre	Subdivisions	Libretto	Première date	Place, theatre
Il Farnace	opera seria	3 acts	Antonio Maria Lucchini	4 November 1751	Naples, Teatro San Carlo
La Costanza	opera buffa		Antonio Palomba	Winter 1752	Naples, Fiorentini
I pastori felici	opera buffa	2 acts		1753	Naples
Le nozze contrastate	opera buffa	3 acts		1753, Carnival 1755	Naples; Rome, Teatro delle Dame
Ezio	opera seria	3 acts	Metastasio	1754?, 1757	Rome, Teatro delle Dame
L'incredulo	opera buffa	2 acts	Pasquale Mililotti	Autumn 1755	Naples, Fiorentini
La fante furba	opera buffa	2 acts	Antonio Palomba	Autumn 1756	Naples, Nuovo
Nitteti	opera seria	3 acts	Metastasio	29 April 1757	Reggio Emilia, Pubblico
Didone abbandonata	opera seria	3 acts	Metastasio	Autumn 1757	Venice, Teatro San Moisè
Olimpiade	opera seria	3 acts	Metastasio	Autumn 1758	Verona, Accademia Filarmonica
Demofoonte	opera seria	3 acts	Metastasio	Carnival 1758	Mantua, Vecchio
Solimano	opera seria	3 acts	Giovanni Ambrogio Migliavacca	Carnival 1758	Parma, Ducale
Buovo d'Antona	dramma giocoso	3 acts	Carlo Goldoni	1750?, 27 December 1758	Venice, Teatro San Moisè
Ippolito ed Aricia	tragedia	5 acts	Carlo Frugoni after Simon-Joseph Pellegrin	9 May 1759	Parma, Ducale
Enea nel Lazio	opera seria	3 acts	Vittorio Amadeo Cigna-Santi	Carnival 1760	Turin, Regio
I Tindaridi	opera seria	5 acts	Carlo Frugoni after Pierre-Joseph Bernard Gentil-Bernard	April 1760	Parma, Ducale
Stordilano, principe di Granata	semiseria e bernesca	3 acts	Giovanni Bertati	Spring 1760	Parma, Ducale
Le feste d'Imeneo	serenata	prologue and 3 acts	Carlo Frugoni	3 September 1760	Parma, Ducale
Armida	azione teatrale	1 act	Giacomo Durazzo after Torquato Tasso	3 January 1761, 1763	Vienna, Burgtheater; Naples
Enea e Lavinia	opera seria	3 acts	Giacobbe Antonio Sanvitale after Bernard le Bovier de Fontenelle	Spring 1761	Parma, Ducale
Zenobia	opera seria	3 acts	Metastasio	Autumn 1761	Lucca
Alessandro nell'Indie	opera seria	3 acts	Metastasio	Spring 1762	Reggio Emilia, Pubblico
Sofonisba	opera seria	3 acts	Mattia Verazi after Antonio Maria Zanetti and Girolamo Zanetti	4 November 1762	Mannheim, Hoftheater
La francese a Malghera	dramma giocoso	3 acts	Pietro Chiari	1762?, 1764	Parma?, Venice, San Cassiano
Ifigenia in Tauride	opera seria	3 acts	Marco Coltellini	4 October 1763	Vienna, Schönbrunn
Antigono	opera seria	3 acts	Metastasio	16 June 1764	Padua, Nuovo
Semiramide	opera seria	3 acts	Metastasio	Carnival 1765	Venice, San Cassiano
Le serve rivali	burletta	3 acts	Pietro Chiari	Autumn 1766	Venice, Teatro San Moisè
Siroe, re di Persia	opera seria	3 acts	Metastasio	Carnival 1767	Munich, Hoftheater
Amore in trappola	dramma giocoso	3 acts	Pietro Chiari	Carnival 1768	Venice, Teatro San Moisè
L'isola disabitata	azione drammatica	1 act	Metastasio	26 December 1768	Bologna, Nuovo Pubblico
Fetonte	opera seria	3 acts		1768	Vienna, Hoftheater
Il tributo campestre	pastorale	1 act	Giovanni Battista Buganza	1768	Mantua, Ducale
Astrea placata	azione teatrale		Metastasio	1770	Saint Petersburg, court
Antigona	opera seria	3 acts	Marco Coltellini	31 October/11 November 1772	Saint Petersburg, court
Amore e Psiche	opera seria	3 acts	Marco Coltellini	29 September 1773	Saint Petersburg, court
Lucio Vero	opera seria	3 acts	Marco Coltellini, after Apostolo Zeno	17/28 November 1774	Saint Petersburg, court
Germondo	opera seria	3 acts	Carlo Goldoni	21 January 1776	London, King's Theatre
La Merope	opera seria	3 acts	Apostolo Zeno	25 January 1776	Milan, Ducale
Telemaco	opera seria	3 acts	Zaccaria de Seriman after Antoine Danchet	15 March 1777	London, King's Theatre
Il cavaliere errante (revision of Stordilano, principe di Granata)	dramma eroicomico	2 acts	Giovanni Bertati	1777?, Spring 1778	Naples, Venice
La disfatta di Dario	opera seria	3 acts	Antonio Morbilli	February 1778	Venice, San Benedetto
Gli eroi dei Campi Elisi (completed by Gennaro Astarita)	dramma giocoso	3 acts		Carnival 1779	Venice, San Samuele
Il cavaliere errante nell'isola disabitata (revision of Il cavaliere errante)			Giovanni Bertati	1779	Vienna, Kärntnertor
