= Ifigenia in Tauride (Jommelli) =

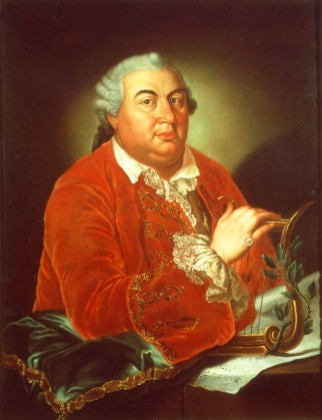
Niccolò Jommelli

Ifigenia in Tauride is an opera (opera seria) in three acts by Niccolò Jommelli set to a libretto by the Mannheim court poet Mattia Verazi. (Note: Verazi's libretto had previously been used for Gian Francesco de Majo's opera of the same name which premiered in Mannheim in 1764.) It premiered on 30 May 1771 at the Teatro di San Carlo in Naples to celebrate the name day of Ferdinand I of the Two Sicilies. The story is based on Iphigenia in Tauris by Euripides.

== Roles ==
Roles, voice type, premiere cast
| Role | Voice type | Premiere cast, 30 May 1771 |
|---|---|---|
| Ifigenia, priestess of Diana | soprano | Maria Anna de Amicis-Buonsollazzi |
| Oreste, Ifigenia's brother | soprano castrato | Gaspare Pacchierotti |
| Toante, King of Tauris | tenor | Arcangelo Cortoni |
| Pilade, Oreste's friend | soprano castrato | Tommaso Galeazzi |
| Tomiri, hereditary princess of Tauris | soprano | Teresa Mignoni |
| Merodate, king of Sarmati | contralto castrato | Pietro Santi |
