= Agafokliya =

Agafokliya (Russian: Агафо́клия) is an old and uncommon Russian Christian female first name. It is derived from the Greek name Agathocles (feminine Agathocleia), itself derived from the Greek words agathos—meaning good, kind—and kleos—meaning glory.

The name, in the form of Agafokleya (Агафо́клея), was included into various, often handwritten, church calendars throughout the 17th–19th centuries, but was omitted from the official Synodal Menologium at the end of the 19th century.
