= Calliroe =

1770 opera by Antonio Sacchini

- Opera seria by Antonio Sacchini
- Antonio Sacchini, engraved portrait
- Librettist: Mattia Verazi
- Language: Italian
- Premiere: 11 February 1770; Schloss Ludwigsburg

Calliroe is an opera by Antonio Sacchini, set to a libretto by Mattia Verazi. It was first performed in Schloss Ludwigsburg on 11 February 1770 and the ballets were set by French choreographer Louis Dauvigny.

The opera follows the usual pattern of opera seria of the time: secco recitative interlaced with da capo arias. Within this format Sacchini introduced strong dramatic music to suit the libretto: stromentato recitative is also used for extra dramatic effect, and the arias are sometimes interrupted by bursts of recitative. Stylistically, the work is thought to anticipate Italian opera of the following decade, and in particular Mozart's Il re pastore.

== Roles ==
Role	Voice type	Premiere Cast, 11 February 1770 (Conductor:)
Bicestre	soprano	Anna Cesari Seeman
Tarsile	soprano castrato	Andrea Grassi
Sidonio	soprano castrato	Francesco Guerrieri
Calliroe	mezzo-soprano	Caterina Bonafini
Dorisia	mezzo-soprano	Monaca (or Monica) Bonanni
Agricane	alto castrato	Giovanni Maria Rubinelli
Arsace	tenor	Gaetano Petti
