= Cajo Mario =

Opera seria composed by Niccolò Jommelli

Cajo Mario is an opera seria in 3 acts by composer Niccolò Jommelli. The opera's Italian language libretto by Gaetano Roccaforte is based on Lucius Anneus Florus's Tito Livio e Plutarco. All of the parts are written for castrati, except for the title role, written for a Tenor. The work premiered on 6 February 1746 at the Teatro Argentina in Rome.

== Roles ==
Role	Premiere Cast Conductor:
Cajo Mario	Litterio Ferrari
Marzia	Giuseppe Chiaramonte
Annio	Gioacchino Conti
Rodope	Giuseppe Casoni
Lucio	Domenico Giardini
Aquilio	Alessandro Veroni
