= Il ratto della sposa =

Il ratto della sposa (The Kidnapped Fiancée) is an opera buffa in three acts by Pietro Alessandro Guglielmi. The Italian libretto was by Gaetano Martinelli.

== Performance history ==
It was first performed at the Teatro San Moisè in Venice in the autumn of 1765. A revised version was staged in London in 1768. The opera was successful and there were productions in succeeding decades, some entitled Lo sposo rapita or Il vecchio deluso.

== Roles ==
Cast	Voice type	Premiere, autumn, 1765 (Conductor:Unknown)
Gaudenzio, a spendthrift	tenor	
Aurora, Gaudenzio's sister, in love with Gentilino	mezzo-soprano	
Donna Ortensia, Gaudenzio's employer, with designs on her employee	soprano	
Dorina, Donna Ortensia's maid, attracted to Gaudenzio	soprano	
Gentilino	tenor	
Polidoro, a rich old man	tenor	
Biondino, Polidoro's nephew	tenor	
