= Sophonisbe (tragedy) =

Play by Voltaire

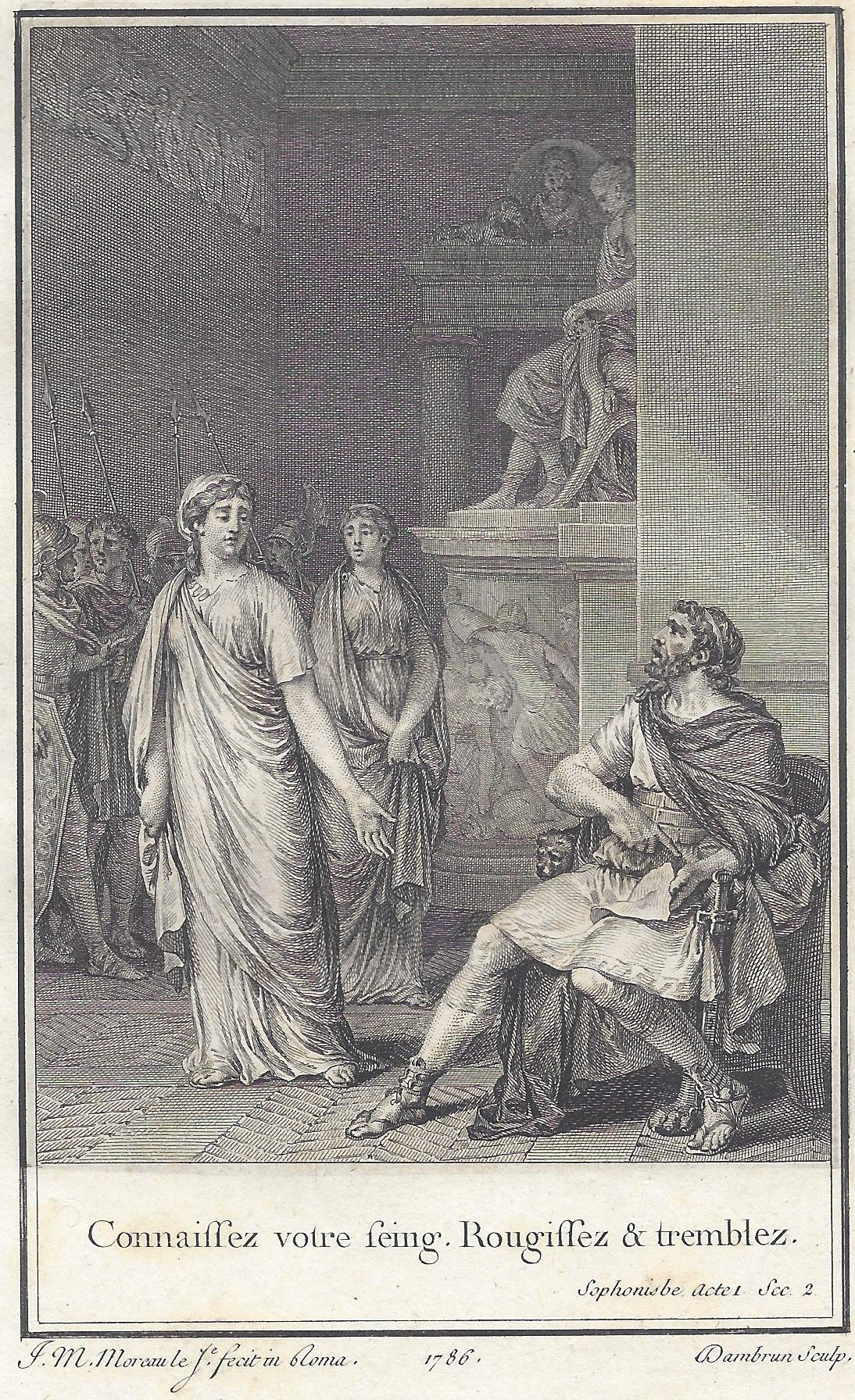
Jean-Michel Moreau: Illustration of Sophonisbe 1786

Sophonisbe is a tragedy in five acts by Voltaire. The play, printed in 1769 but dated 1770, was a stage failure when it premiered on 15 January 1774.

== Action ==
The action takes places in a hall of the palace of Cirta at the time if the Second Punic War. Sophonisbe, daughter of Asdrubal (Hasdrubal) is married to king Siphax (Syphax) of Numidia. Her former fiancé Massinisse (Massinissa) defeats and kills Siphax with the help of the Romans and wants to marry Sophonisbe; Scipion (Publius Cornelius Scipio Africanus) however wants her sent to Rome. Massinisse therefore kills both Sophonisbe and himself.

== Literary sources ==
The material for the plot derives from accounts by Titus Livius, Polybius and Appian, which had already been adapted into stage plays by a number of writers including Gian Giorgio Trissino (1514), Jean Mairet (1629), Pierre Corneille (1663) and Nathaniel Lee (1675). Analysis of the dramatic structure and the verse indicates that Voltaire drew on a number of earlier version of the story while crafting his own.

== Contemporary reception ==
Voltaire succeeded in having the play premiered at the Comédie-Française on 15 January 1774 but there were only four performances before it was taken off the stage. The failure of both this and his other play Don Pèdre, roi de Castille depressed him, and he took a break from writing tragedies until 1777, when he wrote Irène and Agathocle.

== Printed edition ==
Voltaire had arranged the printing of the work in late 1769 with the widow Duchesne in Paris. Publication followed at the end of that year, carrying the date 1770. The work was published with the title Sophonisbe, Tragédie de Mairet, reparée à neuf, Veuve Duchesne, Paris, 1770. Voltaire added an explanatory preface in which he claimed that Mairet's work had been adapted by a certain Jean-Baptiste Lantin, who had died fifty years previously, but this is certainly spurious. It may be that Voltaire was uncertain about how the theatre-going public would respond to the play, and wished to distance himself to some degree from his own creation.
