= Irène (tragedy) =

1778 tragedy in five acts by Voltaire

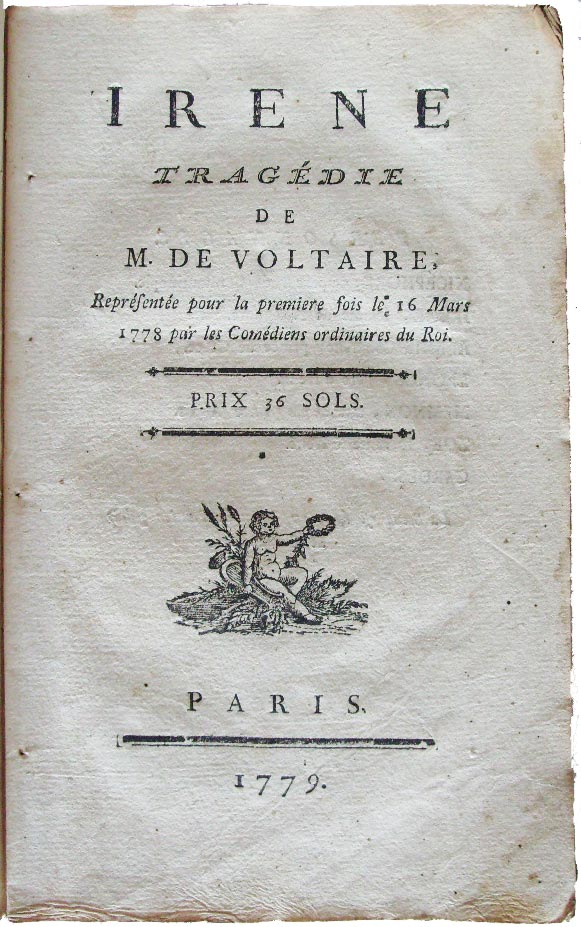
Original Edition of Voltaire's Irène, Paris 1779

Irène is a tragedy in five acts by Voltaire, and his penultimate play. It was written in 1776–1777 and premiered in Paris on March 16, 1778.

== Composition ==
Recent scholarship has suggested that the original inspiration for the story, though not its setting, was an account of the death of a young woman in China who prayed for death rather than betrayal of her faith. At the time he was working on the early versions of the play, Voltaire was reading Mémoires concernant l’histoire, les sciences, les arts, les mœurs, les usages, etc., des Chinois by the Jesuit priest Jean Joseph Marie Amiot and corresponding with d'Alembert and Diderot about what he read. The theme of a woman who chooses death before disloyalty is also classically Confucian.

The play was written as part of Voltaire's plan to make a triumphal return to Paris after having spent nearly twenty years in self-imposed exile in Ferney. He wished to end his life with a great theatrical success that would secure his position for posterity and prevent his enemies from taking any action against him. He therefore set about writing a classical tragedy that would affirm his reputation and enable his return to the centre of French cultural life.

To this end, in the early part of 1777, Voltaire was working on two plays at the same time; one was Irène and the other was Agathocle. Correspondence with his friend d'Argental indicated that he was initially unsure which would be more successful; he gradually came to consider that Irène would work better on stage, and it was indeed Irène that was rehearsed and performed while he was alive. Having previously sent him the manuscript of Agathocle, he wrote to d'Argental on 25 October ‘I'm sending you something (Irène) more passionate, more theatrical, and more interesting.'

The original working title for Irène was Alexis Comnène and it was only in a later revision that the title and the focus of the plot was changed to the heroine. The action is very loosely based in the historical setting of the overthrowing of the Byzantine emperor Nikephoros III Botaneiates by Alexios I Komnenos in the year 1081.

Voltaire also wrote a letter to the Académie Française, which he prefaced to the tragedy. In this letter he emphasized the independence and importance of French poetry in relation to the English tradition in the wake of Shakespeare, referring to a debate launched by Louis-Sébastien Mercier and Michel-Jean Sedaine.

== Action ==
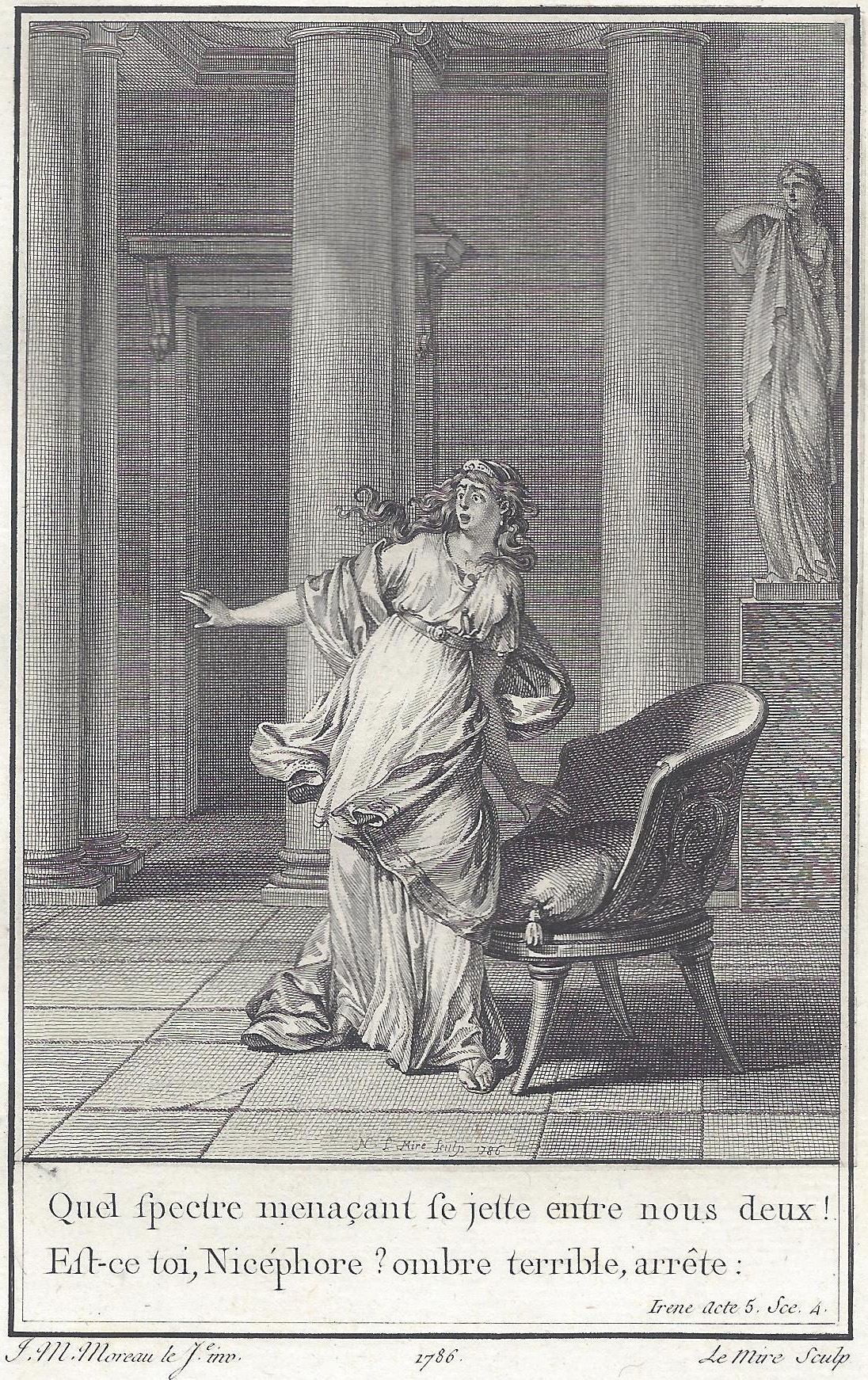
Jean-Michel Moreau: Illustration of Irène, 1786

Irène, compelled by her family to marry Nicéphore, Emperor of Constantinople, loves the prince Alexis. Alexis, returning victorious from campaign to Constantinople against the will of the Emperor, wishes to declare his love to Irène, but Nicéphore orders him to leave the city. Alexis refuses, so the Emperor orders his arrest and execution. Warned by his attaché Memnon, Alexis and his army confront the emperor. Defeated by Alexis but spared, Nicéphore is killed by the people. Alexis ascends the throne. As a widow, Irène is then obliged to enter a convent by her father Léonce. Irène renounces her love for Alexis at her father's insistence. Furious that Léonce will deprive him of his love, Alexis puts the father in chains. Irène appeals for his release and then kills herself, unable to reconcile the claims of love and duty.

Voltaire himself remarked that people might think the play a comedy because 'people may laugh at a woman who takes her own life rather than sleep with the man who has conquered and murdered her husband, when she doesn't love the husband and absolutely adores the murderer.' He also commented that "I had great hopes when beginning the work, but at the end I see nothing but ridicule... nothing can undo the failings of a subject which does not exist in nature.'

== Performances ==
The play was read through at Ferney on 23 October and first performed at Voltaire's private house theatre there for the wedding of the two of Voltaire's friends and protégés, the Marquis de Villette and Reine Philiberte de Varicourt. Its public premiere was on March 16, 1778 by the Comédie-Française at the Théâtre des Tuileries in Paris. The cast was Vanhove (Nicéphore); (fr) Molé (Alexis Comnène); (fr) Brizard (Léonce); Monvel (Memnon); Dusaulx (officier); Mme Vestris (Irène); Mlle Saint-Val cadette (Zoé).

== Contemporary reception ==
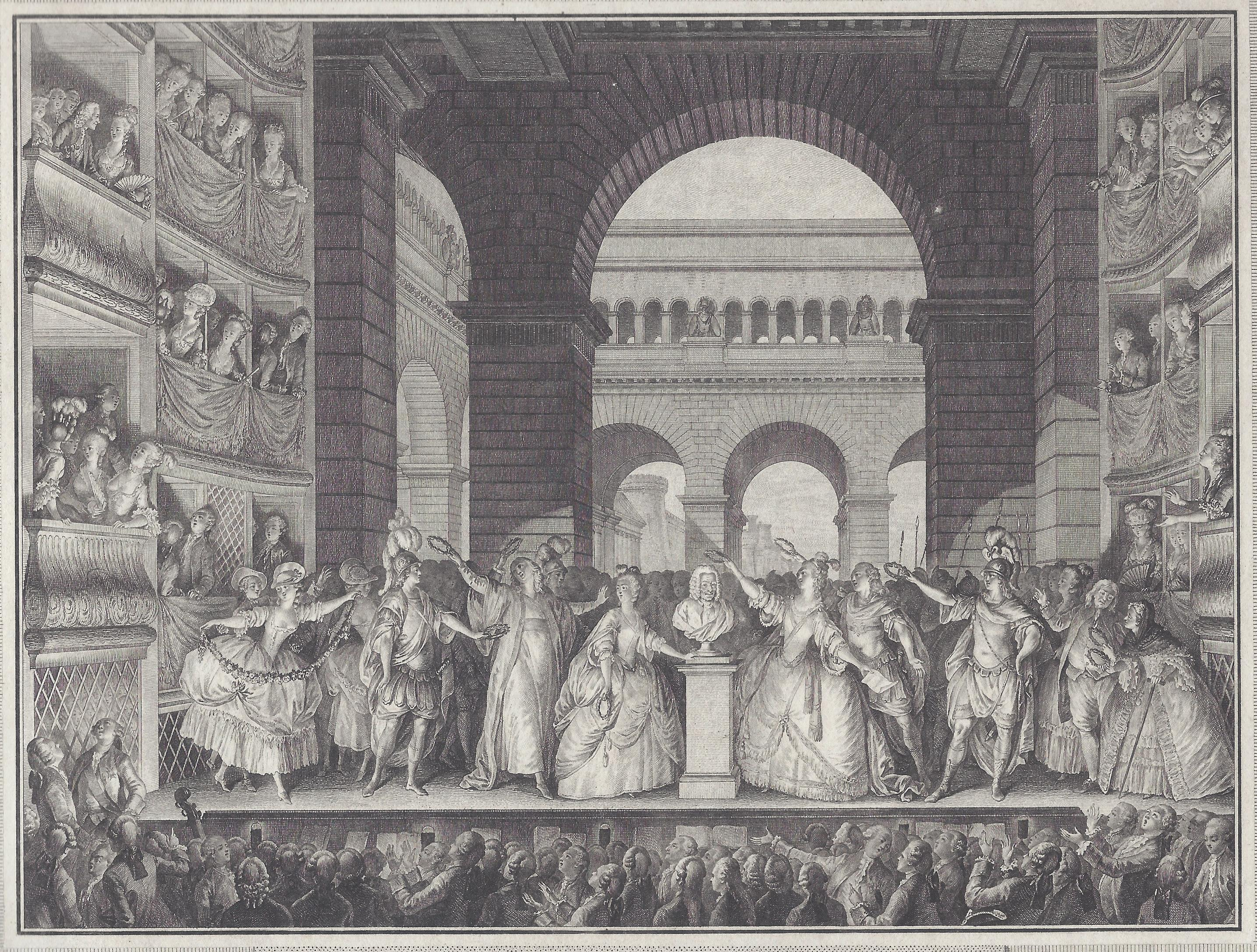
The crowning of Voltaire's bust after the sixth performance of Irène, 30 March 1778

Voltaire's appearance in Paris caused immense public excitement; he was hailed wherever he went and the success of his play was more a tribute to his public standing than to its artistic merits. The dress rehearsal on 14 March 1778 indicated that the play would not fail. The play opened on 16 March in the presence of Marie Antoinette, though Voltaire was too ill to attend; messengers were dispatched to him at the end of each act to report the audience's reception.

For the sixth performance of the play on 21 March, the king's brother the comte d'Artois sent the captain of his guards to congratulate Voltaire, who then attended the performance in person. The audience shouted demands for him to be crowned, upon which one of the actors placed a wreath of laurels on his head. 'My God! Do you want to kill me with glory?' he exclaimed, weeping tears of joy. The play was performed twice that evening, and the actors then inaugurated a bust of Voltaire in the theatre, which they also crowned. After six further performances the play was taken off the stage.

== Printed versions ==
Irène was printed posthumously in Paris in 1779, with another imprint in Lausanne. In neither case is the name of the printer known.
