= Lo spirito di contradizione =

Lo spirito di contradizione (The Spirit of Contradiction) is an opera buffa in three acts by Pietro Alessandro Guglielmi.

Guglielmi contributed a large part of the music to Pasquale Anfossi's 1763 opera Lo sposo di tre e marito di nessuna, which had a Neapolitan libretto by Antonio Palomba. Much of this work was reused by Guglielmi for Lo spirito di contradizione, with the text revised for the Venetian audience by Gaetano Martinelli.

== Performance history ==
It was first performed at the Teatro San Moisè in Venice during carnival 1766.

== Roles ==
Cast	Voice type	Premiere, carnival, 1766 (Conductor:Unknown)
Don Cesarino	tenor	
Lisetta	soprano	
Cecchina	soprano	
Countess Flaminia	mezzo-soprano	
Orazio Capocchio, in love with Lisetta	tenor	
Agabito, a notary in love with Cecchina	tenor	
Nanetta	soprano	
Asdrubale, the governor, Nanetta's brother	tenor	

== Synopsis ==
Don Cesarino is scheming to marry three women (Lisetta, Cecchina and the Countess Flaminia) for their dowries and then disappear, but other men also interested in the women, thwart his plan.
