= Rinaldo di Capua =

Italian composer (1705–1780)

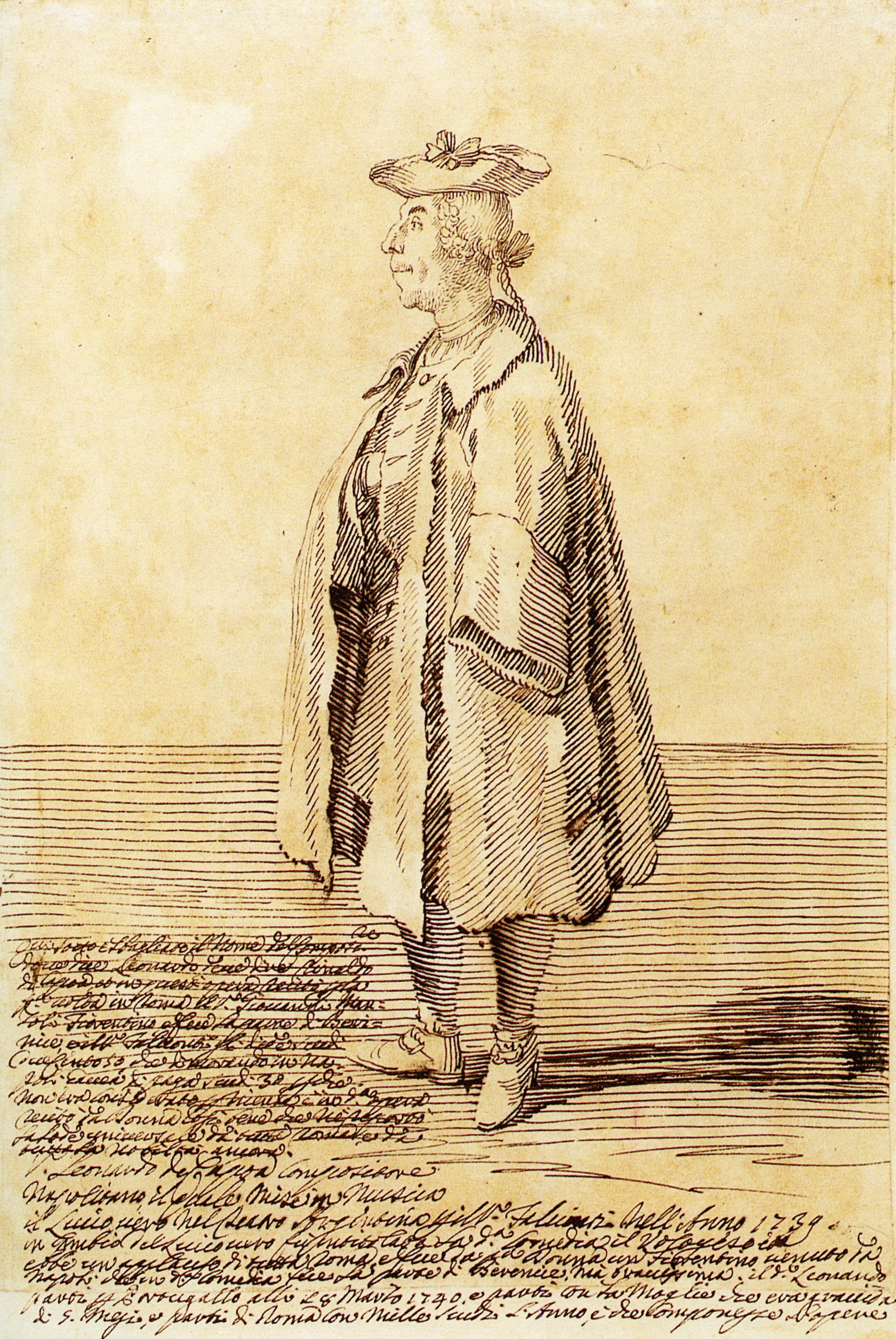

Rinaldo di (da) Capua (Capua, c. 1705 – probably Rome, c. 1780) was an Italian composer. Little is known of him with any certainty, including his name, although he was known to Charles Burney. He may have been the father of composer Marcello Bernardini.

== Works ==
=== Operas ===
- Ciro riconosciuto (dramma per musica, libretto by Pietro Metastasio, 1737, Rome)
- Untitled comic opera (1737, Rome)
- La commedia in commedia (dramma giocoso, libretto by Francesco Vanneschi, after C. A. Pelli, 1738, Rome)
- Vologeso, re de' Parti (dramma per musica, libretto by Guido Eustachio Luccarelli, after Lucio Vero of Apostolo Zeno, 1739, Rome)
- Farnace (dramma per musica, libretto by Antonio Maria Lucchini, 1739, Venice)
- La libertà nociva (dramma giocoso, libretto by Giovanni Gualtiero Barlocci, 1740, Rome)
- Catone in Utica (dramma per musica, libretto by Pietro Metastasio, 1740, Lisbon)
- Didone abbandonata (dramma per musica, libretto by Pietro Metastasio, 1741, Lisbon)
- Ipermestra (dramma per musica, libretto by Pietro Metastasio, 1741, Lisbon)
- Le nozze di Don Trifone (intermezzo, libretto by N. G. Neri, 1743, Rome)
- Turno Heredonio Aricino (dramma per musica, libretto by Silvio Stampiglia, 1743, Rome)
- Il bravo burlato (intermezzo, libretto by Antonio Pavoni, 1745, Rome)
- La forza del sangue (intermezzo, 1746, Rome)
- La finta zingarella (intermezzo, 1748, Perugia)
- Il vecchio amante (dramma giocoso, 1748, Turin)
- Il bravo e il bello (intermezzo, 1748, Rome)
- Mario in Numidia (dramma per musica, libretto by Giampietro Tagliazucchi, 1749, Rome)
- Opera comica senza titolo (1750)
- Il ripiego in amore di Flaminia finta cameriera e Turno (farsetta, libretto by Angelo Lungi, 1751, Rome)
- Il galoppino (intermezzo, 1751, Rome)
- Gli impostori (dramma giocoso, 1751, Modena)
- Il cavalier Mignatta (intermezzo, 1751, Rome)
- La forza della pace (intermezzo, libretto by G. Puccinelli and G. Aureli, 1752, Rome)
- La serva sposa (intermezzo, 1753, Rome)
- L'amante delusa (farsetta giocosa, 1753, libretto by Antonio Pavoni, 1753, Rome)
- La zingara (intermezzo, 1753, Parigi) - reworked in French as La bohemienne by Favart.
- La chiavarina (intermezzo, libretto by G. Peruzzini and A. Luigi, 1754, Rome)
- Attalo (dramma per musica, libretto by Antonio Papi (pseudonimo di Cleofonte Doriano), 1754, Rome)
- La smorfiosa (intermezzo, 1756, Rome)
- Il capitano napoletano (commedia, 1756, Firenze)
- Adriano in Siria (dramma per musica, libretto by Pietro Metastasio, 1756, Rome)
- Le donne ridicole (intermezzo, libretto by Carlo Goldoni, 1759, Rome)
- Il giocatore ed il cavatesori (intermezzo, 1762, Cagli)
- Il matrimonio in villa o sia L'amante di tutte (farsetta, libretto by A. Galuppi, 1762, Rome)
- Il caffè di campagna (farsetta, libretto by Pietro Chiari, 1764, Rome)
- Il passeggio in villa (farsetta, 1765, Rome)
- Il contadino schernito(intermezzo, 1768, Rome)
- I finti pazzi per amore (farsetta, libretto by Tommaso Mariani, 1770, Rome)
- La donna vendicata, o sia L'erudito spropositato (farsetta, libretto by A. Pioli, 1771, Rome)
- La Giocondina (opera buffa, 1778, Rome)
