= La sposa fedele =

1766 opera by Pietro Alessandro Guglielmi

La sposa fedele (The Faithful Bride) is an opera buffa (or according to some sources, dramma giocoso) in three acts by Pietro Alessandro Guglielmi. The Italian libretto was by Pietro Chiari.

It was Guglielmi's most successful opera, mixing comedy and pathos.

There is an opera with the same title by Giovanni Pacini, first staged in 1819.

== Performance history ==
La sposa fedele was first performed at the Teatro San Moisè in Venice on 26 December 1766, though it is possible that it was given first in Cremona in 1765.

Other productions followed in Italy and elsewhere in Europe (including London at the King's Theatre on 31 October 1775) as La Rosinella, ossia La sposa fedele, La fedeltà in amore, La sposa costante, and La costanza di Rosinella. In Germany it was given as Robert und Kalliste, oder der Triumph der Treue. A German vocal score was published in 1777 in Berlin and Leipzig.

== Roles ==
Cast	Voice type
Rosinella	soprano
Pasqualino	tenor
Marchese del Vento Ponente	bass
Conte Lelio	tenor
Camilla	soprano
Lauretta	contralto
Valerio	bass

== Synopsis ==
Rosinella and Pasqualino are separated when their ship is wrecked near the home of the Marchese del Vento Ponente. The Marchese and Conte Lelio have designs on Rosinella, but she is true to Pasqualino.
