= La pastorella nobile =

Opera by Pietro Alessandro Guglielmi

La pastorella nobile (The Noble Shepherdess) is an commedia per musica in two acts by Pietro Alessandro Guglielmi. The Italian libretto was by Francesco Saverio Zini.

== Performance history ==
La pastorella nobile was first performed at the Teatro del Fondo in Naples on 15 or 19 April 1788 with Irene Tomeoni, the creator of the title role of La bella pescatrice as the shepherdess Eurilla.

It was one of Guglielmi's most successful opera. Productions followed in Italy and elsewhere, including London, Paris, Madrid, Dresden and Prague, sometimes under the title L'erede di Belprato. In Germany it was given as Die Schöne auf dem Lande, Die adelische Schäferin and Das adelige Landmädchen.

In Vienna it was the most popular opera at the beginning of the 1790s. Adriana Ferrarese and Francesco Benucci, the first Fiodiligi and Guglielmo in Così fan tutte sang the roles of Donna Florida and Don Polibio, in a version that apparently enhanced the importance of Donna Florida, probably through a revision by Lorenzo Da Ponte, Mozart's librettist and Ferrarese's lover. However the later arrival on the scene of Tomeoni (to sing Eurilla) led to the restoration of the original version.

== Roles ==
Cast	Voice type	Premiere, 15 or 19 April 1788
Eurilla, a shepherdess	soprano	Irene Tomeoni
Marchese Astolfo	tenor	
Don Polibio, the mayor	bass	
Don Calloandro, Don Polibio's son	baritone	
Donna Florida, Astolfo's fiancée	soprano	
Don Astianatte. Donna Florida's brother	tenor	

== Synopsis ==
Eurilla, the shepherdess is pursued by Marchese Astolpho. who is to marry Donna Florida, while Eurilla is attracted to Don Calloandro, the son of Don Polibio, the mayor.
