= João de Sousa Carvalho =

Portuguese composer

- Born: 22 February 1745; Estremoz, Portugal
- Died: c. 1798; Alentejo, Portugal

João de Sousa Carvalho (22 February 1745 – c. 1798) was the foremost Portuguese composer of his generation.

Born in Estremoz, he studied music from 1753 at the Colégio dos Santos Reis in Vila Viçosa, then from 1761 at the Conservatório di Sant' Onofrio a Porta Capuana in Naples. In 1766 his setting of Metastasio’s operatic libretto La Nitteti was performed in Rome. The following year, he joined the Irmandade de Santa Cecília at Lisbon and was appointed professor of counterpoint in the Seminário da Patriarcal, where he later served as mestre (1769–1773) and mestre de capela (1773–1798). In 1778, he became music teacher to the royal family. He died in 1798 in Alentejo at the age of 53.

His numerous church works are written in a style similar to that of Niccolò Jommelli and, sometimes, Haydn. Several of his opere serie and serenatas were performed at the royal palaces of Ajuda and Queluz. Some of his keyboard music survives and is occasionally played today.

His Opera Buffa L'amore industrioso was discovered by conductor and scholar David Chernaik in the Biblioteca da Ajuda in manuscript, and performed in London and Oporto in 2000–2002.

== Some compositions ==
- L’amore industrioso, 1769 (revived 1943, 1967, 2000)
- Eumene (dramma serio per musica), 1773
- L’Angelica (serenata), 1778
- Perseo (serenata), 1779
- Testoride argonauta (dramma), 1780 (revived 1987)
- Seleuco, re di Siria (dramma), 1781
- Everardo II, re di Lituania (dramma), 1782
- Penelope nella partenza da Sparta (dramma per musica), 1782
- L’Endimione (dramma per musica), 1783
- Tomiri (dramma per musica), 1783
- Adrasto, re degli Argivi (dramma per musica), 1784
- Nettuno ed Egle (favola pastorale), 1785
- Alcione (dramma per musica), 1787
- Numa Pompilio II, re dei romani (serenata), 1789
- Fiat Misericordia - cooperative transcription of the score from the manuscript in the Wiki-score platform.
- Masses, 1769, 1789, 1792

== Bibliography ==
- Luiz, Carlos Santos (1999), João de Sousa Carvalho: Catálogo Comentado das Obras, Fundação Calouste Gulbenkian.
- Manuel Carlos de Brito: Opera in Portugal in the Eighteenth Century (Cambridge, 1989)
- Robert Stevenson/Manuel Carlos de Brito: Carvalho, João de Sousa, Grove Music Online ed. L. Macy (Accessed [2007-05-05), http://www.grovemusic.com
