= Agathocle =

1777 dramatic tragedy by Voltaire

Agathocle is the last dramatic tragedy by Voltaire. It was written by the 84-year-old author in 1777 almost simultaneously with the tragedy Irène, only months before he died. It was not performed on the public stage until the first anniversary of his death.

== Composition ==
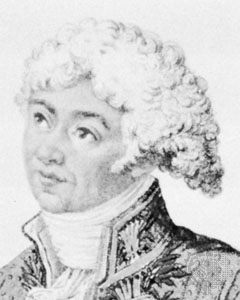
The actor Fleury, who played the role of Polycrate

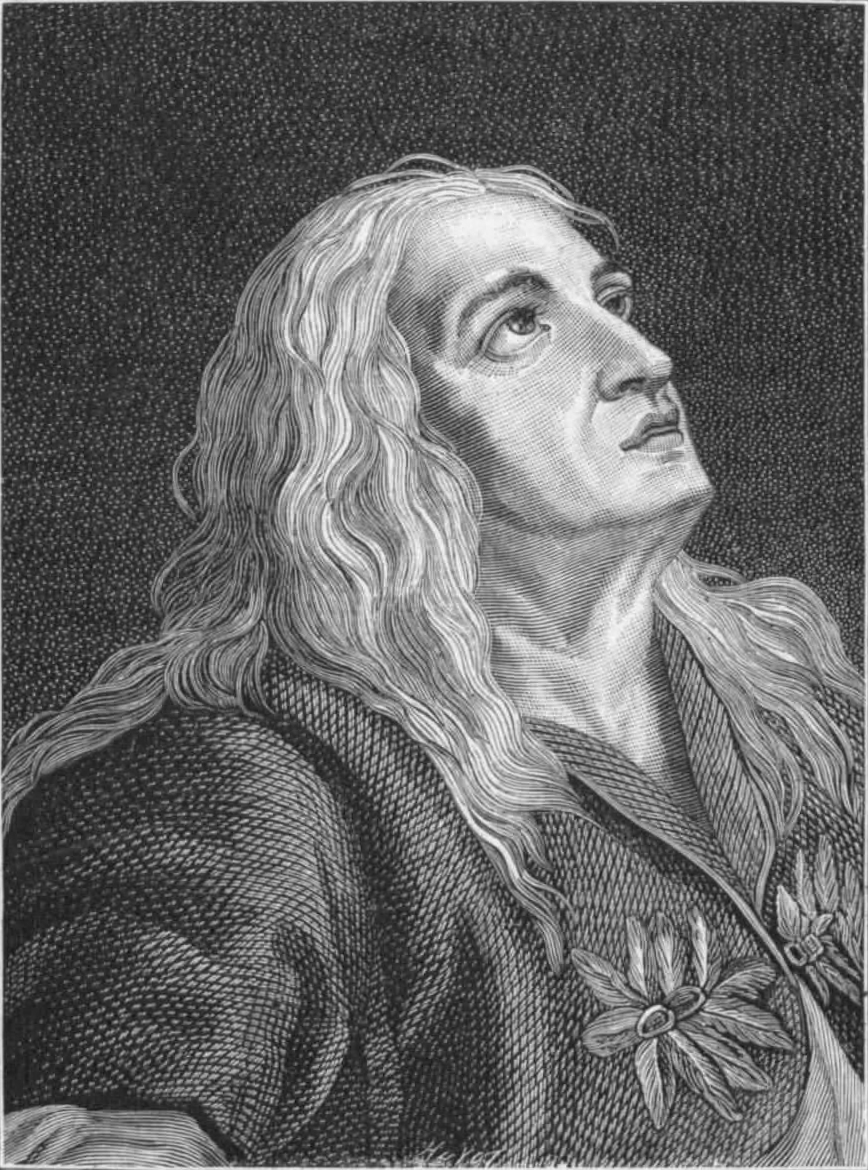
The actor Brizard, who played the role of Ydasan

Voltaire sent a copy of the manuscript to his friend d'Argental in August 1777, describing it to him as 'too cold and insipid' and urging him not to let anyone else see it. A month later, after further work, he was more confident about it, and hoped that the marvel of a play from an 84-year-old would soften the harshness of the critics. However of his two new plays he gradually came to consider that Irène would work better on stage, and it was indeed that work which was rehearsed and performed while he was alive. He wrote again to d'Argental on 25 October to say that he felt Agathocle was only suitable for performing 'at the Olympic Games of some school of Platonic philosophy. I'm sending you something (Irène) more passionate, more theatrical, and more interesting.'

== Action ==
The action takes place in ancient Syracuse in the palace of the tyrant Agathocle (Agathocles) and the ruins of the Temple of Ceres. Peace has been agreed between Syracuse and Carthage, which requires prisoners to be freed. The Carthaginian soldier Ydasan wants to secure the release of his captive daughter Ydace, but both sons of the tyrant Agathocle desire her. Polycrate is ready to undermine the peace agreement by refusing to allow Ydace to leave. The selfless Argide, on the other hand, protects her from his brother and when a fight ensues, he kills him. Agathocle is consumed with grief at his son's death, but recognises the virtue in Argide's motives. Argide renounces any claim over Ydace. To general surprise, Agathocle abdicates in favour of Argide, who promptly abdicates in turn, declaring the Republic restored.

== Performances ==
The first performance of Agathocle was a private one in the house theatre on Voltaire's estate at Ferney in September 1777, after which the author made a number of corrections to it. After Voltaire died his niece Mme Denis asked the Comédie Française to stage it for the first anniversary of his death on 31 May 1779. Before the performance, the actor Jean Baptiste Brisard read a speech written by Jean-Baptiste le Rond d'Alembert.

The role of Agathocle was played by (fr) Grammont, Polycrate by Fleury, Argide by (fr) Molé, Ydasan by (fr) Brizard, Egeste by Dorival, Elpénor by Florence, and Ydace by Mlle Saint-Val.

The public did not like the play and Agathocle was taken off the stage after only four performances.

== Contemporary reception ==
Critical opinion was not kind to Agathocle. La Harpe described it as ‘a most imperfect sketch’ with lifeless and colourless characters which the author might have been able to work up into a full play if he had tackled the subject earlier before his strength failed him. The Kehl edition of Voltaire's works also emphasised that the work was little more than an outline, of value mainly because it showed how Voltaire worked up a dramatic idea into a final performance text.

== Printed editions ==
Agathocle was first printed in volume six of the Kehl edition of Voltaire's Complete Works (Oeuvres Completes de Voltaire, Kehl, 1784, Volume 6, pp. 337–393). No contemporary printings of the play on its own are known.
