= Le serve rivali =

Opera by Tommaso Traetta

Le serve rivali is a dramma giocoso per musica in two acts by composer Tommaso Traetta with an Italian libretto by Pietro Chiari. The opera originally premiered in one act as an intermezzo at the Teatro San Moisè in Venice, Italy in the autumn of 1766. Traetta greatly expanded the work, and the full opera was first performed at the Fenzo Modesto in Venice later that same year.

== Roles ==
Role	Voice type	Premiere Teatro San Moisè Cast, 1766 (Conductor:)	Premiere Fenzo Modesto Cast, 1766 (Conductor:)
Lelio	soprano castrato	Pietro Benedetti	role not included
Giacinta	mezzo-soprano	Giovanni Ripa (castrato en travesti)	Teresa Zaccarini
Palmetta	soprano	Nicola Cecini (castrato en travesti)	Giovanna D'aquino
Giannino	tenor	Francesco Bussani	Gioacchino Caribaldi
Don Grillo	tenor	role not included	Giacomo Rizzoli
Carlina	soprano	role not included	Brigida Marchesi
Letanzio	tenor	role not included	Antonio Nazzolini
