= Jean Du Castre d'Auvigny =

French soldier and writer

Jean Du Castre d'Auvigny was a French soldier and writer born in French Hainaut in 1712.

He served with distinction in the chevau-légers and died at the battle of Dettingen on 27 June 1743.

He authored the following books:

- Mémoires de Madame de Barneveldt (1732, 2vol. in 12)
- Amusements historiques
- Histoire de Paris (jusqu'en 1730)
- Vies des hommes illustres de la France (continued by abbott Gabriel-Louis Pérau and Turpin), 1739–1757, 27 volumes in-12.

He worked in collaboration with abbé Desfontaines and was the actor Préville's step brother.

== Sources ==
- Jean Du Castre d'Auvigny on Wikisource
