= Charles-Augustin de Ferriol d'Argental =

French diplomat (1700–1788)

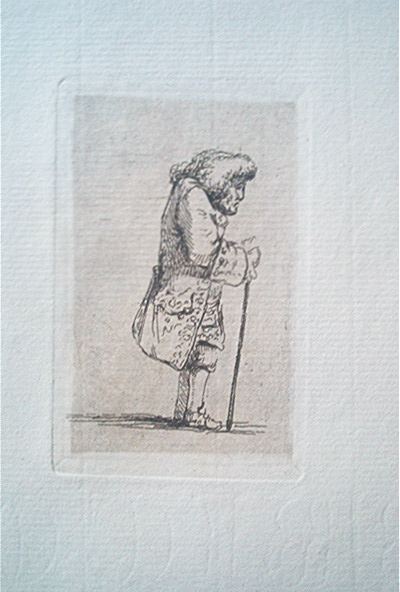
Vinant Denon - Charles-Augustin de Ferriol d'Argental

Charles-Augustin de Ferriol d'Argental (20 December 1700 – 5 January 1788), was a French lawyer and diplomat, particularly remembered as a lifelong friend of Voltaire.

== Family ==
His father was Augustin-Antoine de Ferriol (1653-1736 or 1737), comte d'Argental, président à mortier of the parlement of Metz and brother of Charles de Ferriol d'Argental, French ambassador to the Sublime Porte. His mother was Marie-Angélique de Tencin, sister of cardinal Pierre Guérin de Tencin and Claudine Guérin de Tencin, mother of d'Alembert. His brother was the dramatic writer fr:Antoine de Ferriol de Pont-de-Veyle. He and Pont-de-Veyle were brought up with Charlotte Aïssé, bought as a child by their uncle Charles de Ferriol d'Argental. In 1737 Charles-Augustin married Jeanne-Grâce Bosc du Bouchet (d.1774). He was nicknamed 'goussaut' ('sturdy horse') within his family. On the death of his aunt in 1760, he inherited the title baron Saint-Martin-de-Ré.

== Career ==
D'Argental passed his bar exams in 1719 and became an advocate in the Parlement of Paris in 1721. He was offered the post of intendant of Saint-Domingue in 1738, but turned it down; he did however accept the post of Minister Plenipotentiary to France of the Duchy of Parma and Piacenza from 1759 to 1788. During the disputes between Louis XV and the Parlement in the 1750s, he was more inclined to the side of the Crown than of those seeking greater independence for the Parlement.

== Friendship with Voltaire ==
Like Voltaire, d'Argental was educated at Louis-le-Grand, though as he was six years younger, it is not certain that they knew each other at school. Like Voltaire he was devoted to the theatre. Voltaire's first letter to him was written in 1724 and after this they corresponded frequently - more than 1,200 from Voltaire to d'Argental have survived, though d'Argental wrote much less often, and never visited Voltaire in Ferney.

From 1737, supported by his wife, he became Voltaire’s literary critical friend, as well as his theatre agent and even his stage director. While Voltaire was exiled in Ferney it was the d’Argentals who did what was necessary to bring his plays to the stage, securing the venues, contracting the actors, and working with them intensively to ensure that Voltaire’s meaning was properly communicated.

As well as helping Voltaire in theatrical matters, d’Argental was his indispensable organiser in the campaigns against injustice in the 1760s - the Calas, de la Barre and Sirven Affairs. His close connections with the court and in particular with the Foreign Minister Choiseul were especially useful in these cases.

In 1760, when funds were being raised to pay for a statue of Voltaire by Pigalle, he did not have enough money to make a contribution, so he borrowed 10,000 livres from Voltaire himself. From the time Voltaire returned from exile to Paris in February 1778 until his death in May, d’Argental was with him constantly.

== Relationship with Adrienne Lecouvreur ==
As a young man he developed an infatuation for the famous actress Adrienne Lecouvreur. His mother was afraid that he would marry her, and threatened to send him to the colonies to prevent this. The actress wrote to her in 1721 promising to spurn his advances, and urging her not to exile a son so able and so full of promise. D'Argental knew nothing of this correspondence until, sixty-three years later, he was going through his mother's papers at the age of eighty-five. As was normal at the time for actors, Lecouvreur was denied a proper Christian burial when she died and her body was disposed of in unconsecrated ground. In 1786, fifty-six years after her death, d'Argental managed to locate her burial place at what is new 115 rue de la Grenelle in Paris. He placed there a marble tablet with a poem to her that he had written.

== Work ==
It is believed by some scholars that d'Argental was the true author of the fr:Mémoires du comte de Comminge (1735) which was published by his aunt, Mme de Tencin. However Voltaire confirmed that d'Argental himself never claimed to have been the author.

== Death ==
D'Argental died in 1788 after contracting a fever, which lasted only a few days.
