= Mattia Verazi =

Italian librettist

Mattia Verazi (c.1730 – 20 November 1794) was an Italian librettist primarily active at the court of Charles Theodore in Mannheim, Holy Roman Empire. He became known as the leader of a group of librettists who challenged the conventions of opera seria in the mid-18th century and was a long-time collaborator of composer Niccolò Jommelli. He also produced the libretti for Salieri's Europa riconosciuta, Sacchini's Calliroe, and J. C. Bach's Temistocle

The exact date and place of Verazi's birth are unknown, but he was described in contemporary libretti as "Romano" (from Rome, which was then the capital of the Papal States). His first known opera libretto was for Niccolò Jommelli's Ifigenia in Aulide which premiered in Rome in 1751. It was the beginning of a 20-year friendship and collaboration, with Verazi producing the libretti for seven of Jomelli's operas, including Ifigenia in Tauride and the innovative Fetonte. Verazi served as the official court poet and personal secretary to Charles Theodore in Mannheim from 1756 to 1778 and later worked in Milan and Munich where he died in 1794.
