= Pietro Chiari =

Pietro Chiari (Italian pronunciation: [ˈpjɛːtro ˈkjaːri]; 25 December 1712 – 31 August 1785) was an Italian Catholic priest, playwright, novelist and librettist.

== Life ==
Chiari was born and died in Brescia. He was a Jesuit until leaving the order in 1747. From 1747 to 1762 he was court poet of Duke Francis III of Modena, in Venice, although not at the public cost. During this period he wrote nearly 60 comedies, which from 1761 or earlier often brought him into conflict with his rival Goldoni. With a deep hatred for the style of Molière, Chiari made comédie larmoyante fashionable in Italy under the name commedia fiebile. He also edited the Gazzetta Veneta from 1761 to 1762, when he returned to his birthplace to spend his final years.

== Works ==
=== Comedies ===
- El Mario cortesan
- I Fanatici
- I Filosofi pazzi
- I Raggiri fortunati
- Il Filosofo veneziano (1753)
- Il Medico Veneziano al Mongol
- Il Poeta comico
- Il Tesoro
- Il Trionfo dell'innocenza
- L'Amore di libertà
- L'Arlecchina
- L'Astrologia (1762)

- L'Ingannatore ingannato (1764)
- L'Inganno amoroso
- L'Innamorato di due
- L'Uomo come gli altri
- L'Uomo di buon cuore
- La Bella Pellegrina
- La Buona Madrigna
- La Donna di parola
- La Donna di spirito
- La Famiglia stravagante
- La Gratitudine
- La Madre tradita

- La Moscovita in Siberia
- La Notte critica
- La Nuora sagace
- La Pamela maritata
- La Partenza
- La Pastorella fedele
- La Pescatrice innocente
- La Rovina di Troja
- La Schiava cinese (1753)
- La Scuola delle vedove (1749)
- La Serva senza patron
- La sposa fedele (1773)

- La Vedova prussiana
- La Vendetta amorosa
- La Veneziana in Algeri
- Le Nozze di Bertoldo
- Le serve rivali
- Le Sorelle chinesi
- Le Sorelle rivali
- Marco Accio Plauto
- Molière, marito geloso
- Pamela schiava combattuta

=== Tragedies ===
- Catilina, based on the life of Catilina
- Giulio Cesare, based on the life of Julius Caesar
- Kouli-Kan, based on the life of Timur
- La Morte di Kouli-Kan
- Marco Antonio triumviro, based on the life of Mark Antony
- Marco Tullio Cicerone, based on the life of Cicero

=== Novels ===
- La Filosofessa italiana (1753)
- La Cantatrice per disgrazia, osia le avventure della Marchesa N. N. scritte da lei medesima (1754)
- Le Memorie di madama Tolot ovvero la giocatrice di lotto (1757)
- La Bella Pellegrina (1759)
- La Francese in Italia (1759)
- La Veneziana di spirito (1762)
- L'Americana ramminga, cioè Memorie di Donna Jnnez di Quebrada. Scritte da lei stessa, e ora pubblicate da M. G. Di S. Sua confidente amica (1763; work attributed to Chiari)
- La Ballerina onorata, o sia Memorie d'una figlia naturale del duca N. V. scritte da lei medesima
- La Fantasima, aneddoti castigliani d'una dama di qualità, scritti da lei medesima
- Memorie del Barone di Trenk Comandante de' Panduri (1784; date it came to light)
- I privilegi dell'ignoranza – Lettere d'una Americana ad un Letterato d'Europa (1784)

== Bibliography ==
- (in Italian) Alessio Giannanti, L'America di Pietro Chiari. Tra attribuzioni apocrife e riflessioni filosofiche
- (in Italian) Carmelo Alberti, Convegno Un rivale di Carlo Goldoni, l'abate Chiari e il teatro europeo del Settecento, Vicenza, N. Pozza, 1986
- (in Italian) Giuseppe Antonelli, Alle Radici della letteratura di consumo : la lingua dei romanzi di Pietro Chiari e Antonio Piazza, Milan, Istituto di propaganda libraria, 1996
- (in Italian) Luca Clerici, Il Romanzo italiano del Settecento : il caso Chiari, Venezia, Marsilio, 1997
- (in French) Xavier de Courville, Un Artisan de la rénovation théâtrale avant Goldoni Luigi Riccoboni, Paris, 1894
- (in French) Pietro Toldo, L’Œuvre de Molière et sa fortune en Italie, Turin, E. Loescher, 1910
