= Niccolò Jommelli =

Italian composer (1714–1774)

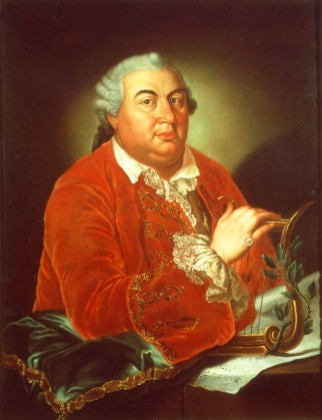
- Born: 10 September 1714; Aversa
- Died: 25 August 1774 (aged 59); Naples
- Occupation: Composer

Niccolò Jommelli (Italian: [nikkoˈlɔ jomˈmɛlli]; 10 September 1714 – 25 August 1774) was an Italian composer of the Neapolitan School. Along with other composers mainly in the Holy Roman Empire and France, he was responsible for certain operatic reforms including reducing ornateness of style and the primacy of star singers somewhat.

== Biographical information ==
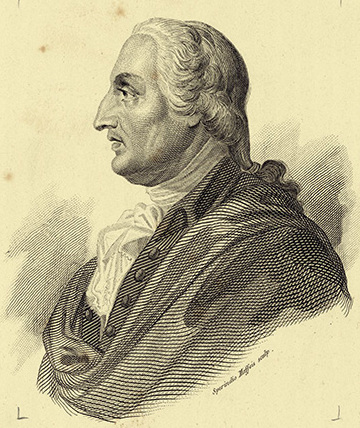
Portrait of Niccolò Jommelli

=== Early life ===
Jommelli was born to Francesco Antonio Jommelli and Margarita Cristiano in Aversa, a town some 24 kilometres (15 mi) north of Naples. He had one brother, Ignazio, who became a Dominican friar and was of some help to him in his elder years, and three sisters. His father was a prosperous linen merchant, who entrusted him for musical instruction to Canon Muzzillo, the director of the choir of Aversa Cathedral.

When this proved successful, he was enrolled in 1725 at the Conservatorio di Santo Onofrio a Capuana in Naples, where he studied under Ignazio Prota alongside Tomaso Prota and Francesco Feo. Three years later he was transferred to the Conservatorio della Pietà dei Turchini, where he was trained under Niccolò Fago, with Don Giacomo Sarcuni and Andrea Basso, as second maestri (maestri di canto), or singing teachers. He was greatly influenced by Johann Adolf Hasse, who was in Naples during this period. After completing his studies he began work, and wrote two opere buffe, L'errore amoroso in early 1737 and Odoardo in late 1738. His first opera seria, Ricimero re di Goti, was such a success in Rome in 1740 that he immediately received a commission from Henry Benedict Stuart, the Cardinal-Duke of York.

When still studying at the conservatory, Jommelli was impressed with Hasse's use of obbligato recitative to increase the tension at certain dramatic moments in his operas. Speaking of obbligato recitative for Ricimero, Charles de Brosses says that Jommelli's use of obbligato recitative was better than anything he had heard in France.

=== First operas ===
His first opera, the comedy L'errore amoroso, was presented, with great success, under the protection of the Marquis del Vasto, Giovanni Battista d'Avalos, in the winter of 1737 at the Teatro Nuovo of Naples. It was followed the next year by a second comic opera, Odoardo, in the Teatro dei Fiorentini. His first serious opera Ricimero rè de' Goti, presented in the Roman Teatro Argentina in January 1740, brought him to the attention and then the protection of the Duke of York, Henry Benedict. The duke would later be raised to the rank of cardinal and procure Jommelli an appointment at the Vatican. During the 1740s, Jommelli wrote operas for many Italian cities: Bologna, Venice, Turin, Padua, Ferrara, Lucca, Parma, Naples and Rome.

=== Studies with Padre Martini ===
When in Bologna in 1741 for the production of his Ezio, Jommelli (in a situation blurred by anecdotes) met Padre Martini. Saverio Mattei said that Jommelli studied with Martini, and claimed to have learned with him "the art of escaping any anguish or aridity". Nonetheless, his constant travelling to produce his many operas seems to have prevented him from ever taking composition lessons on a regular basis. Moreover, his relationship with Martini was not without mutual criticism. The main result of his stay in Bologna and his association with Martini was to present to the Accademia Filarmonica of that city, as application for admission, his first known sacred composition, a five-voice fugue a cappella on the final words of the small doxology, "Sicut erat". Musicologist Karl Gustav Fellerer, who examined several such works, testifies that Jommelli's piece, though being just "a rigid school work", could well rank among the best admission pieces now stored in the Bolognese Accademia Filarmonica. During the early 1740s he wrote an increasing amount of religious music, mainly oratorios, and his first liturgical piece still extant, a very simple "Lætatus sum" in F major dated 1743, is part of the Santini collection in Münster.

Shortly after his time in Bologna, Jommelli moved to Venice and composed Merope, which was the forerunner for French operatic style later in the century. In the years immediately after this, he wrote operas for Venice, Turin, Bologna, Ferrara and Padua, and two popular oratorios, Isacco figura del Redentore and Betulia liberata.

=== Venice ===
Some time around 1745, Hasse recommended Jommelli for a position as the Director of Music at the Ospedale degli Incurabili in Venice, one of that city's colleges for female musicians. This full-time employment required him to compose sacred music (mostly settings of the Mass and the Divine Office), but the financial security it gave him also allowed him to compose several other dramatic works.

Hasse's recommended appointment of Jommelli as maestro di cappella to the Ospedale degl' Incurabili in Venice is not definitively documented. But in 1745, he did start writing religious works for the women's choir of the church of the Incurabili, San Salvatore, as part of his obligations as chapel master along with teaching the more advanced students of the institution. There are no manuscripts of Jommelli's music composed for the Incurabili, but there are many copies of different versions of several of his works that may, with some certainty, be attributed to his period as maestro there. Among the music Helmut Hochstein lists as being composed for Venice are to be found four oratorios: "Isacco figura del Redentore", "La Betulia liberata", "Joas" and "Juda proditor"; some numbers in a collection of solo motets called "Modulamina Sacra"; one Missa breve in F major with a Credo in D major, probably a second Mass in G major, one Te Deum and five psalms.

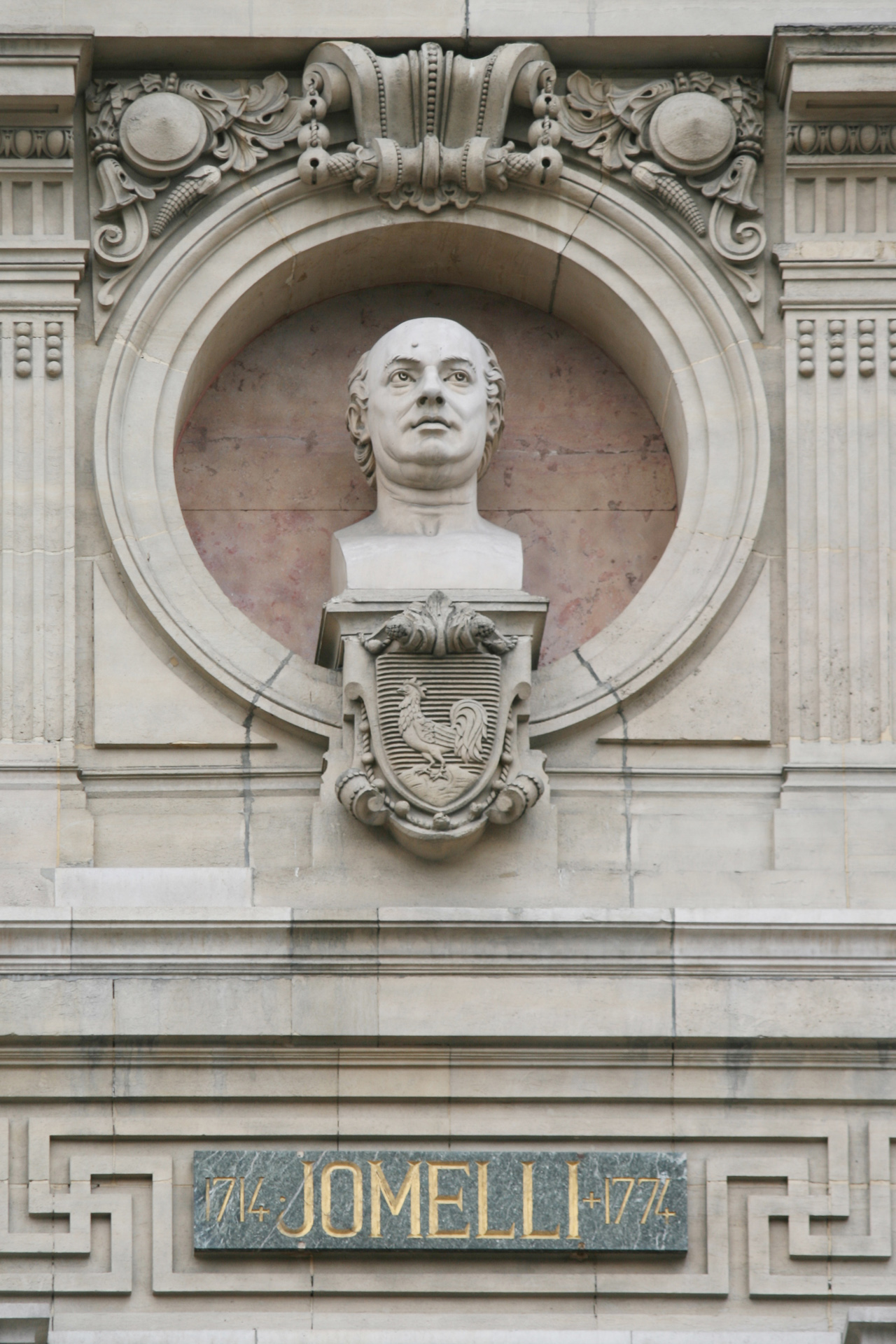
Jommelli finds a place among the composers commemorated on the Opéra Garnier, Paris

Although two of his earliest biographers, Mattei and Villarosa, give 1748 as the year when Jommelli gave up his employment in Venice, his last compositions for the Incurabili are from 1746. He must have left Venice at the very end of 1746 or at the beginning of the following year, because on 28 January 1747 Jommelli was staging at the Argentina theatre in Rome his first version of "Didone abbandonata", and in May at San Carlo in Naples a second version of "Eumene".

=== Rome ===
It was the need of an active chapel master for the basilica of St. Peter's in preparing for the Jubilee festival year that brought both Jommelli and Davide Perez to Rome in 1749, a year-long commemoration celebrated by the Roman Catholic Church every fifty years, so this was an important occasion for the Roman aristocracy to show off. Jommelli was summoned by the Cardinal Duke of York, Henry Benedict, to compose for him a setting of Metastasio's oratorio La passione di Gesù Cristo still played annually in Rome, and who presented him to Cardinal Alessandro Albani, an intimate of Pope Benedict XIV.

=== Stuttgart and last years ===
He subsequently visited Vienna before taking a post as Kapellmeister to Duke Karl Eugen of Württemberg in Stuttgart in 1753. This period saw some of his greatest successes, including the composition of what are regarded as some of his best works. Many were staged at the Duke's private theatres in the Palace of Ludwigsburg, outside Stuttgart. Mozart and his father Leopold passed through Ludwigsburg in 1763 on their "grand tour" and met the composer. Jommelli returned to Naples in 1768, by which time opera buffa was more popular than Jommelli's opera seria, and his last works were not so well received. He suffered a stroke in 1771 which partially paralyzed him, but continued to work until his death three years later, in Naples.

== Works ==
Jommelli wrote cantatas, oratorios and other sacred works, but by far the most important part of his output were his operas, particularly his opere serie of which he composed around sixty, several with libretti by Metastasio. These tended to concentrate more on the story and drama of the opera than on flashy technical displays by the singers, as was the norm in Italian opera at that time. He wrote more ensemble numbers and choruses, and, influenced by French opera composers such as Jean-Philippe Rameau, introduced ballets into his work. He used the orchestra (particularly the wind instruments) in a much more prominent way to depict what was going on in the story, including passages for orchestra alone, rather than consigning it to merely support for the singers. From Hasse, he learned to write orchestrally accompanied recitatives rather than just "secco" recitatives for voice and continuo (mainly harpsichord). His reforms are sometimes regarded as equal in importance to Christoph Willibald Gluck's.

=== Orchestral music ===
- Sinfonia novella a 4 in E J598/1 (c. 1760)
- Sinfonia novella a 4 in A J598/2 (c. 1760)
- Sinfonia novella a 4 in D J598/3 (c. 1760)
- Sinfonia novella a 4 in F J598/4 (c. 1760)
- Sinfonia novella a 4 in F J598/5 (c. 1760)
- Sinfonia novella a 4 in E J598/6 (c. 1760)

=== Chamber music ===
- Sonata in C for Organ 4-Hands (c. 1750)
- Trio Sonata in D for 2 Flutes and Cello (c. 1750)

=== Instrumental music ===
- Ciaccona in Eb for Organ, Op. 5/13 (c. 1764)
- “Sinfonia di Salterio” with two violins and basso continuo

=== Masses ===
- Missa pro defunctis (Requiem) in Eb (1756)
- Missa solemnis in D for Soprano, Alto, Tenor, Bass, Choir and Orchestra (1766)

=== Psalms ===
- Beatus vir (c. 1750)
- Laetatus sum (Psalm 122) in F (1743)
- Miserere (Psalm 51) in G a 4 concertato (1749)
- Miserere in G minor for 5 voices (SSATB), choir and continuo, HC1.23 (1750)
- Miserere in D for 2 sopranos, alto and tenor (1751, for Rome)
- Miserere in E minor for 8 voices (1753, for Stuttgart)
- Pietà, pietà, Signore (Miserere) in G minor for 2 sopranos, strings and continuo (1774)

=== Oratorios ===
- Isacco, figura del Redentore (1742)
- Betulia liberata per 4 voci, coro e strumenti (Rome, 1743) – libretto by Metastasio
- Gioas re di Giuda (Venice, 1745) – libretto by Metastasio
- La Passione di Gesù Cristo per 4 voci (Venice, 1749) – libretto by Metastasio

=== Operas ===
- L'errore amoroso (Naples, 1737) – libretto by Antonio Palomba
- Odoardo (Naples, 1738)
- Ricimero re de' Goti (Rome, 1740)
- Astianatte (Rome, 1741) – libretto by Antonio Salvi
- Ezio (Bologna, 1741) – libretto by Metastasio
- Semiramide riconosciuta (Turin, 1741) – libretto by Metastasio
- Merope (Venice, 1741) – libretto by Apostolo Zeno
- Don Chichibio (Rome, 1742)
- Eumene (Bologna, 1742) – libretto by Apostolo Zeno
- Semiramide (Venice, 1742) – libretto by Francesco Silvani
- Tito Manlio (Turin, 1743) – libretto by Gaetano Roccaforte
- Demofoonte (Padua, 1743) – libretto by Metastasio
- Alessandro nell'Indie (Ferrara, 1744) – libretto by Metastasio
- Ciro riconosciuto (Ferrara, 1744; later in Bologna and Venice) – libretto by Metastasio
- Sofonisba (Venice, 1746) – libretto by Antonio Maria Zanetti e Girolamo Zanetti
- Cajo Mario (Rome, 1746) – libretto by Gaetano Roccaforte
- Antigono (Lucca, 1746) – libretto by Metastasio
- Tito Manlio (Venice, 1746) – libretto by Jacopo Antonio Sanvitale
- Didone abbandonata (Rome, 1747; later in Stuttgart) – libretto by Metastasio
- L'amore in maschera (Naples, 1748) – libretto by Antonio Palomba
- Achille in Sciro (Vienna, 1749; much later in Rome) – libretto by Metastasio
- Artaserse (Rome, 1749) – libretto by Metastasio
- Demetrio (Parma, 1749) – libretto by Metastasio
- Intermezzo Don Trastullo (Rome, 1749)
- Intermezzo L’uccellatrice e il Don Narciso (Venice, 1751) – libretto by Carlo Goldoni
- Cesare in Egitto (Rome, 1751) – libretto by Giacomo Francesco Bussani
- Ifigenia in Aulide (Rome, 1751) – libretto by Mattia Verazi
- La villana nobile (Palermo, 1751) – libretto by Antonio Palomba
- Ipermestra (Spoleto, 1751) – libretto by Metastasio
- Talestri (Rome, 1751) – libretto by Gaetano Roccaforte
- I rivali delusi (Rome, 1752)
- Attilio Regolo (Rome, 1753)
- Bajazette (Turin, 1753) – libretto by Agostino Piovene
- Fetonte (Stuttgart, 1753) – libretto by Leopoldo de Villati
- La clemenza di Tito (Stuttgart, 1753) – libretto by Metastasio
- Il paratajo (Paris, 1753) – revision of L’uccelatrice e il Don Narciso
- Don Falcone (Bologna, 1754)
- Catone in Utica (Stuttgart, 1754) – libretto by Metastasio
- Lucio Vero (Milan, 1754)
- Il giardino incantato (Stuttgart, 1755)
- Enea nel Lazio (Stuttgart, 1755) – libretto by Mattia Verazi
- Penelope (Stuttgart, 1755) – libretto by Mattia Verazi
- Il Creso (Rome, 1757) – libretto by Giovacchino Pizzi
- Temistocle (Naples, 1757) – libretto by Metastasio
- Tito Manlio (Stuttgart, 1758)
- Ezio (Stuttgart, 1758)
- L'asilo d'amore (Stuttgart, 1758)
- Endimione (Stuttgart, 1759)
- Nitteti (Stuttgart, 1759) – libretto by Metastasio
- Alessandro nell'Indie (Stuttgart, 1760)
- Cajo Fabrizio (Mannheim, 1760) – libretto by Mattia Verazi
- L'Olimpiade (Stuttgart, 1761) – libretto by Metastasio
- L'isola disabitata (Ludwigsburg, 1761) – libretto by Metastasio
- Semiramide riconosciuta (Stuttgart, 1762)
- Il trionfo d'amore (Ludwigsburg, 1763) – libretto by Giampiero Tagliazucchi
- Demofoonte (Stuttgart, 1764)
- Il re pastore (Ludwigsburg, 1764) – libretto by Metastasio
- La pastorella illustre (Stuttgart, 1764) – libretto by Giampiero Tagliazucchi
- Temistocle (Ludwigsburg, 1765)
- Imeneo in Atene (Ludwigsburg, 1765)
- Il matrimonio per concorso (Ludwigsburg, 1766) – libretto by Gaetano Martinelli
- La critica (Ludwigsburg, 1766)
- Il Vologeso (Ludwigsburg, 1766) – libretto by Mattia Verazi
- Il matrimonio per concorso (Ludwigsburg, 1766)
- Il cacciatore deluso (Tübingen, 1767) – libretto by Gaetano Martinelli
- Fetonte (Ludwigsburg, 1768)
- L'unione coronata (Solitude, 1768)
- La schiava liberata (Ludwigsburg, 1768) – libretto by Gaetano Martinelli
- Armida abbandonata (Naples, 1770) – libretto by Francesco Saverio de' Rogati
- Demofoonte (Naples, 1770)
- Ifigenia in Tauride (Naples, 1771) – libretto by Mattia Verazi
- L'amante cacciatore (Rome, 1771)
- Le avventure di Cleomede (1771) – libretto by Gaetano Martinelli
- Cerere placata (Naples, 1772)
- Il trionfo di Clelia (Naples, 1774) – libretto by Metastasio

== Recordings ==
- Agonia di Christo, conducted by Roberto Gini and Ensemble Concerto (1991), Nuova Era records: Agonia di Cristo. E altri musiche per il Venerdi Santo.
- One concerto in Neapolitan Flute Concertos, Auser Musici, Carlo Ipata (2010), Hyperion CDA 67784
- Six trio sonatas, played by the Accademia Farnese (Oct. 20, 1997), Mondo Musica label
- Armida abbandonata, conducted by Rousset (Maison de la Radio, Paris, July 24 to Aug. 2, 1994), FNAC label
- Didone abbandonata, conducted by Bernius (1994), Orfeo label
- Il Vologeso, conducted by Bernius (1997), Orfeo label
- L'uccelatrice e il Don Narciso, conducted by Fracassi (live in Piacenza, 2000), Bongiovanni label
- L'uccelatrice e il Don Narciso, conducted by Moretto (live in Milan, 2003), Dynamic label
- Requiem, Coro e Orchestra Ghislieri conducted by Giulio Prandi (studio recording, 2019), Arcana Label
- Il Vologeso, The Mozartists, conducted by Ian Page (2021), Signum Records
