= Pietro Alessandro Guglielmi =

Italian opera composer (1728–1804)

- Born: 9 December 1728; Massa, Duchy of Massa and Carrara
- Died: 19 November 1804 (aged 75); Rome, Papal States
- Genres: Classical; dramma giocoso; opera buffa; opera seria
- Occupation: Opera composer

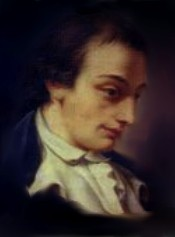
Pietro Alessandro Guglielmi

Pietro Alessandro Guglielmi (9 December 1728 – 19 November 1804) was an Italian opera composer of the classical period.

== Biography ==
Guglielmi was born into the Guglielmi family of musicians in Massa. His father, Jacopo Guglielmi, was a composer and conductor of the orchestra in the court of the Duke of Massa. Pietro received his first musical education from his father who taught him to play bassoon and the viola; eventually becoming a musician under his father at court while still a boy. Pietro's brother, Abate Domenico, was the maestro di cappella at the Massa Cathedral, and Pietro studied the organ under him.

A child prodigy, Guglielmi's talent as a musician earned him the favor of the Duke of Massa who took an interest in supporting his musical development. The Duke initially paid for Guglielmi to have formal musical training with Jacopo Puccini (the great-great-grandfather of Giacomo Puccini) in Massa, and afterwards paid his tuition for his education at the Conservatorio di Santa Maria di Loreto in Naples which he entered in 1746.At that conservatory he was a pupil of Francesco Durante, and in 1750 he was appointed a primo maestrino (a post responsible for teaching younger students) at that institution. He completed his studies at the conservatory in 1754.

His first operatic work, produced at Turin in 1755, established his reputation, and soon his fame spread beyond the limits of his own country, so that in 1762 he was called to Dresden to conduct the opera there. He remained for some years in Germany, where his works met with much success, but the greatest triumphs were reserved for him in England.

He went to London, according to Charles Burney, in 1768, but according to Francesco Florimo in 1772, returned to Naples in 1777. He continued to produce operas at an astounding rate, but was unable to compete successfully with the younger masters of the day. In 1793 he became maestro di cappella at St Peter's, Rome, where he died in 1804.

He was a very prolific composer of Italian dramma giocoso and commedia per musica operas, and there is in most of his scores a vein of humour and natural gaiety not surpassed by Domenico Cimarosa himself. In opera seria he was less successful. But here also he shows at least the qualities of a competent musician. Considering the enormous number of his works, his unequal workmanship and the frequent instances of mechanical and slipshod writing in his music need not surprise us.

He also wrote oratorios and miscellaneous pieces of orchestral and chamber music. Of his eight sons two at least acquired fame as musicians: Pietro Carlo Guglielmi (1763-1827), a successful imitator of his father's operatic style, and Giacomo Guglielmi, an excellent singer.

== Compositions ==
=== Operas ===
See List of operas by Pietro Alessandro Guglielmi.

=== Oratorios, cantatas, serenatas ===
- La madre de' Maccabei (componimento sacro, libretto by Giuseppe Barbieri, 1764, Rome)
- Componimento drammatico per le faustissime nozze de S.E. il cavaliere Luigi Mocenigo colla N.D. Francesca Grimani (libretto by A. M. Borga, 1766, Venice)
- Telemaco (componimento drammatico, libretto by Giuseppe Petrosellini, 1775, Rome)
- Cantata per il genetliaco della sovrana e l'inaugurazione delle adunanze di una nuova Società Filarmonica (libretto by G. Jacopetti, 1776, Massa)
- Diana amante (serenata, libretto by Luca Serio, basato su Endimiione di Pietro Metastasio, 1781, Naples)
- La felicità dell'Anfriso (componimento drammatico, libretto by Giuseppe Pagliuca, 1783, Naples)
- Pallade (cantata, libretto by Carlo Giuseppe Lanfranchi-Rossi, 1786, Naples)
- Debora e Sisara (azione sacra, libretto by Carlo Sernicola, 1788, Naples)
- La Passione di Gesù Cristo (oratorio, 1790, Madrid)
- Aminta (favola boscheraccia, libretto by C. Filomarino, 1790, Naples)
- Il serraglio (cantata, libretto by A. L. Palli, 1790)
- La morte di Oloferne (tragedia sacra, based on La Betulia liberata by Pietro Metastasio, 1791, Rome)
- Gionata Maccabeo (oratorio, 1798, Naples)
- Il paradiso perduto, cioè Adamo ed Eva per il loro noto peccato discacciati dal paradiso terrestre (azione sacra, libretto by Rasi, 1802, Rome)
- Cantata sagra (libretto by A. Grandi, 1802, Rome)
- L'Asmida (cantata)
- L'amore occulto (cantata)
- La morte di Abele (oratorio)
- Le lagrime di San Pietro (oratorio)
