= Alessandro nell'Indie (Metastasio) =

Libretto in three acts by Pietro Metastasio

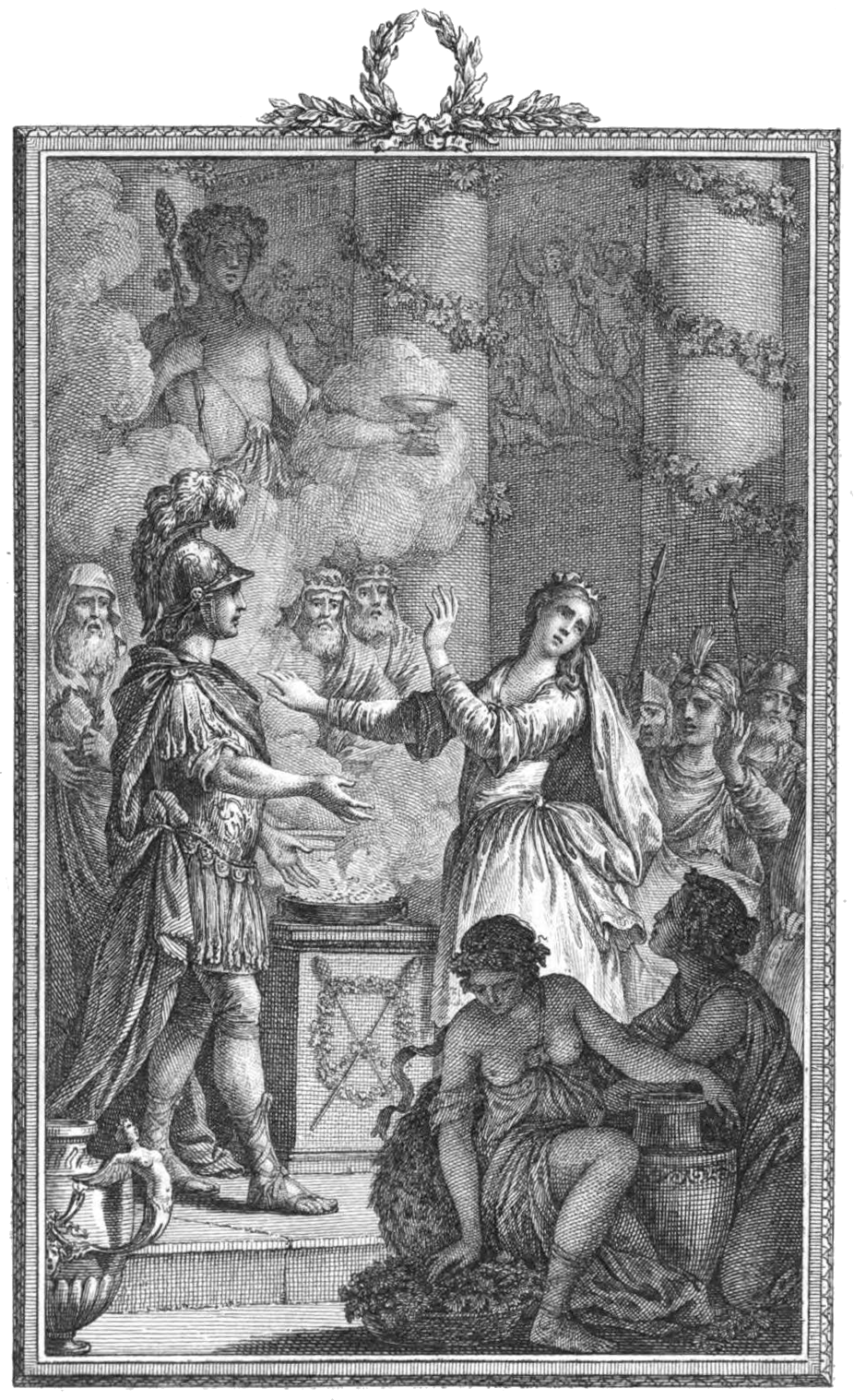
Metastasio: Alessandro nell'Indie, Herissant Vol. 4, Paris 1780

Title page of the original libretto

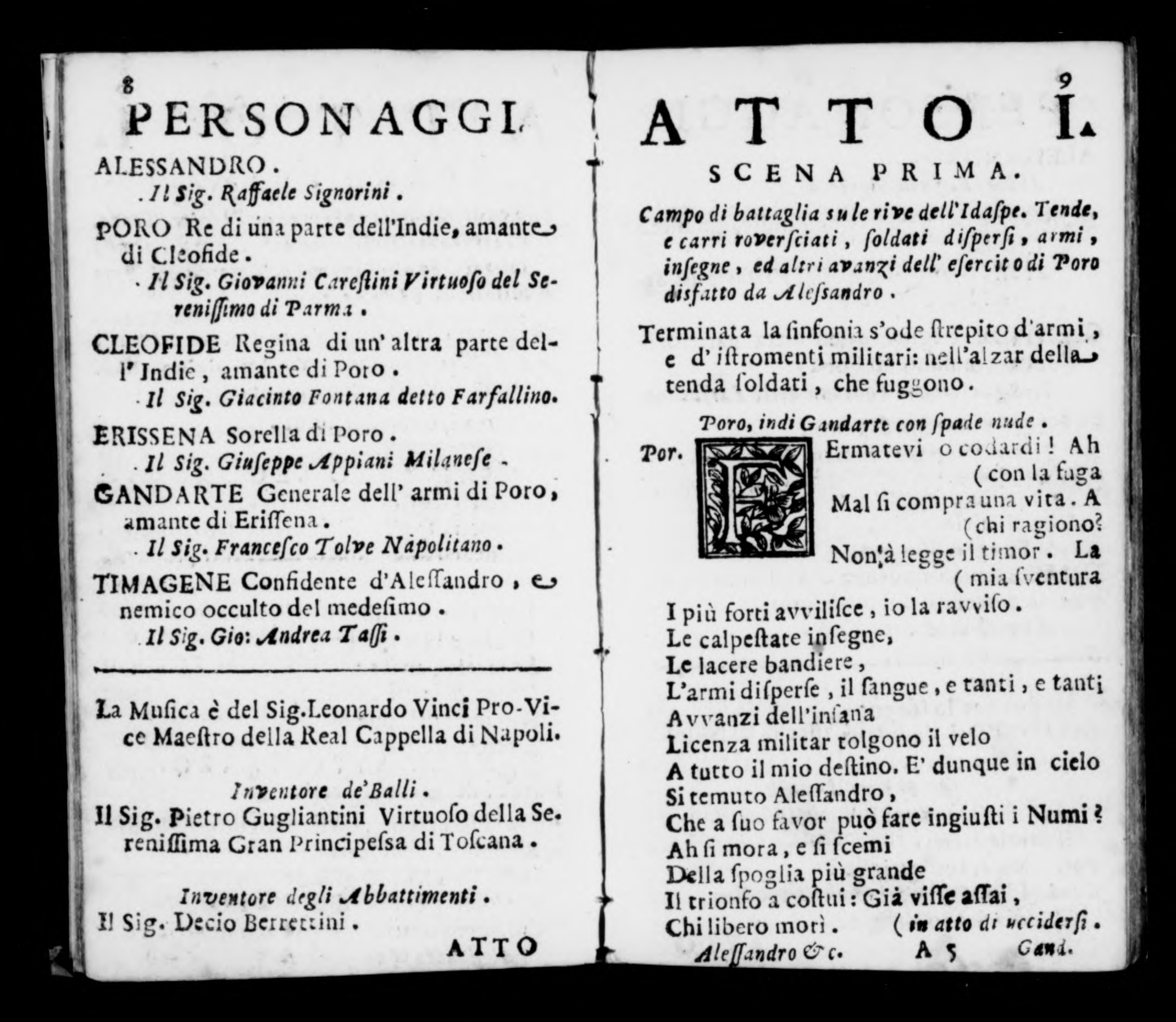
List of roles in the original libretto

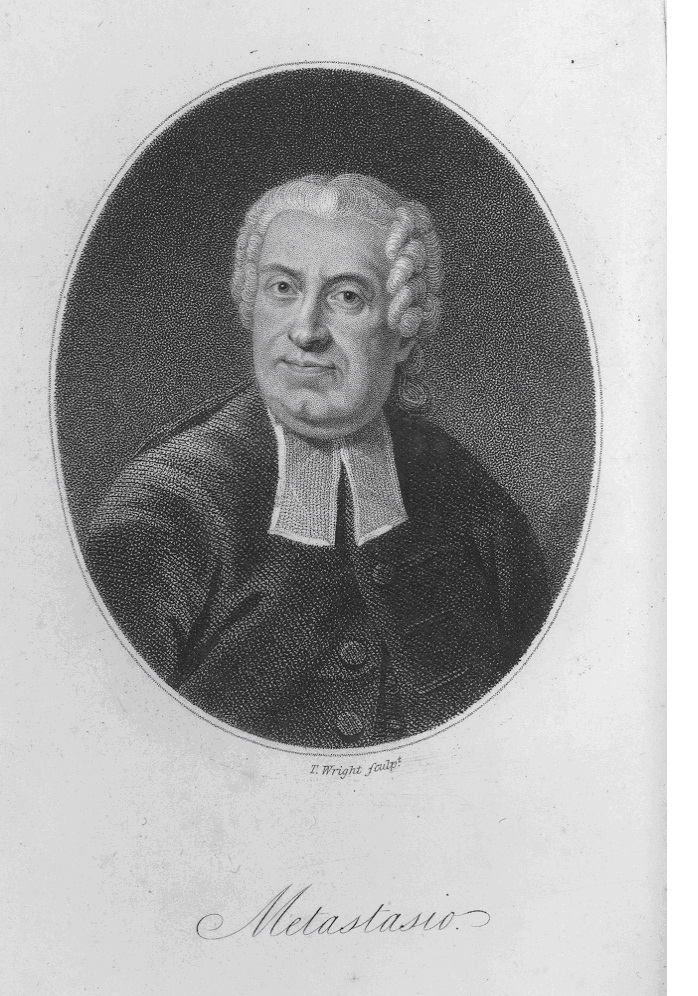
Pietro Metastasio

Alessandro nell'Indie (lit. 'Alexander in India') is a libretto in three acts by Pietro Metastasio. It was set to music around ninety times firstly by Leonardo Vinci, whose version premiered in Rome on 2 January 1730. The libretto was the fourth of five that Metastasio wrote for the Teatro delle Dame in Rome between 1727 and 1730. The work was dedicated to the Stuart pretender to the British throne, James Francis Edward Stuart, then resident in Rome.

Alessandro nell'Indie became Metastasio's second most popular work, after Artaserse. Both were written for the Rome carnival season.

== Synopsis ==
The libretto tells the story of the Indian campaign of Alexander the Great and his defeat of king Porus in 326 BCE at the Battle of the Hydaspes. After the battle the two kings were reconciled and Alexander left Porus as ruler of his kingdom. The action takes place on the banks of the Hydaspes, where Alexander's camp stands on one side of the river and the residence of Cleofide on the other.

Roles

- Alessandro il Grande (Alexander the Great), premiered by Raffaele Signorini
- Poro (Porus), Indian king, lover of Cleofide, premiered by Giovanni Carestini
- Cleofide (Cleophis), Indian queen and lover of Porus, premiered by Giacinto Fontana, also known as "Farfallino"
- Erissena, Poros' sister, premiere by Giuseppe Appiani
- Gandarte, Porus' friend and general, who loves Erissena, premiered by Francesco Tolve
- Timagene (Coenus), Alexander's general and secret enemy, premiered by Giovanni Antonio Taffi

The following plot summary is based on the setting by Carl Heinrich Graun in his 1774 opera, Alessandro e Poro. (Note: Italian/German Libretto for the setting by Carl Heinrich Graun, Berlin 1784, digital copy at the Staatsbibliothek zu Berlin.)

=== Act 1 ===
The Indian camp after Porus' defeat

At the end of the overture, warlike music and the sound of guns can be heard. As the curtain opens, the Indian soldiers are seen fleeing from Alessandro's troops. The Indian King Poro tries to stop their flight, but unable to do so, he tries to kill himself. However, he is prevented by his general Gandarte, who reminds him of his beloved Cleofide. However, Poro believes that she has entered into a relationship with Alessandro. To protect his king, Gandarte offers to exchange clothes, and from then on Poro appears as Asbite and Gandarte as Poro. A little later Asbite / Poro is arrested by Timagene after a short fight. Alessandro comes in and orders no unnecessary blood to be spilled. Timagene leaves to pass the order on to the soldiers. After Asbite / Poro is introduced to Alessandro as a friend of Poro, Alessandro releases him and asks him to tell Poro that all he had to do was submit in order to secure to peace. He also gives him his own sword as a gift. Poro accepts this, but swears to Alessandro to use it against himself.

Timagene comes with the captive Erissena, Poro's sister, who was handed over to him by two Indians. Alessandro is horrified by this act. He orders the two traitors to be bound and handed over to Poro. Despite Timagene's advice, Erissena is released immediately. After Alessandro leaves, Erissena tells Timagene how impressed she is by Alessandro. Timagene, who has his eye on Erissena himself, becomes jealous.

A place surrounded by shady trees

Poro relates Alessandro's victory to Cleofide, whom he considers to be Alessandro's lover. Cleofide, however, assures him of her continued love and asks him to trust her. He swears never to be jealous again. However, when Cleofide asks Erissena, who has just arrived, whether Alessandro had spoken of her, his jealousy is immediately rekindled. Cleofide sets off for Alessandro's camp. Although Erissena advises Poro to trust Cleofide, he wants to follow her. Gandarte arrives. He has noticed that Timagene is an enemy of Alessandro and therefore still has hope for a victory. He also advises Poro against following Cleofide. Poro goes anyway. When Erissena enthuses to Gandarte about Alessandro, he points out that Poro has already promised her to him.

Large open tent with a view of Alessandro's camp and the Cleofide's residence on the other side of the Hydaspes

Cleofide crosses the Hydaspes to deliver gifts to Alessandro. He rejects them because he does not accept gifts from friends and only demands loyalty from vassals. Timagene announces the arrival of Asbites/Poro, who wants to speak to him in the presence of Cleofides. Asbite/Poro explains that Poro does not consider himself to have been defeated and rejects the proffer of peace. Cleofide tries to appease Alessandro and invites him to her residence to find out Poro's real intentions. She is sure that Asbite must have misunderstood Poro. However, Asbite assures her that he knows Poro's intentions very well and warns Alessandro about Cleofide, who once loved Poro and has now become unfaithful to him. In order to punish Poro for his renewed jealousy, Cleofide now declares her love for Alessandro. Alessandro promises her friendship, but not his heart. He leaves and Poro is reconciled with Cleofide.

=== Act 2 ===
Room in Cleofide's Palace

Poro and Gandarte plan to seize the bridge over the Hydaspes, counting on the support of Timagene. When Erissena reports Alessandro's arrival, Poro thinks again of Cleofide's alleged infidelity. Gandarte advises him to forget her, and leaves. Although Erissena would like to see Alessandro again, Poro sends her away. He intends to avoid Cleofide and is anticipating victory over Alessandro.

By the bridge over the Hydaspes, with the Greek camp on the far bank

Accompanied by warlike music, Alessandro and Timagene cross the bridge with part of their army. Cleofide comes to meet them with her retinue and greets him in a friendly manner. The greeting is interrupted by the sound of guns when Poro attacks. Alessandro and Timagene hurry to the bridge.

The attack has been repelled by Alessandro. Cleofide begs the fleeing Poro not to leave her, but only when she threatens to plunge into the river and finally promises him marriage does he give in. With the enemy approaching, Poro pulls out his dagger to kill both Cleofide and himself, but Alessandro snatches it from him. To justify his action Asbite/Poro wants to reveal his true identity, but he is interrupted by the arrival of Timagene. Timagene reports that the soldiers blame Cleofide for the ambush and demand her blood. However, since Asbite/Poro assumes the blame himself, Alessandro arrests him and hands him over to Timagene. Cleofide begs Alessandro in vain to release him. Timagene sends Cleofide to his palace, and she asks him to tell Poro to remain steadfast. Timagene hands Asbite/Poro a letter assuring him that he is not to blame for the failure of the assault. Poro leaves. Timagene hopes that his intrigues against Alessandro will eventually be successful.

Room in Cleofide's Palace

Cleofide tells Gandarte that Poro intended to kill her out of love. Alessandro arrives and Gandarte hides. Alessandro tells Cleofide that he has failed to calm his soldiers' anger, and Cleofide is ready to die as a martyr. In order to save her, Alessandro offers to marry her. Since Cleofide does not want this, Gandarte, who is still dressed as Poro, comes out of hiding and offers himself as a sacrifice to save Cleofide. Alessandro is so impressed by this nobility that he hands Cleofide over to him and promises to release Asbite too. He leaves. Erissena comes and reports that Poro has thrown himself into the Hydaspes and is dead. Erissena advises the desperate Cleofide to flee.

=== Act 3 ===
Covered colonnade in the palace garden

Erissena meets Poro, who is believed to be dead, but the report of his death was only spread by Timagene for his own protection after he released him. Poro is now planning to ambush Alessandro in the garden and wants Timagene to lure him there. To prove that Timagene is on his side, Poro gives Erissena his letter. After Poro leaves, first Cleofide and then Alessandro arrive. Alessandro tries to persuade Cleofide to flee. However, she now wishes to accept his marriage offer. Alessandro asks her to meet him at the temple and leaves.

Alessandro comes back with two guards and reports to Erissena that Timagene has uncovered a planned ambush. Erissena believes that Timagene has betrayed her and hands Alessandro Timagene's letter as proof of her own innocence. With Timagene's betrayal now exposed, Alessandro sends Erissena away so he can think.

Alessandro asks Timagene what he would do if he were betrayed by a friend. When Timagene replies that mercy would be out if the question in such a case, Alessandro shows him the incriminating letter. Timagene begs for mercy. Alessandro is ready to forgive him if he is faithful in the future. He leaves.

Asbite/Poro comes to talk to Timagene about the planned ambush but Timagene no longer wants to have anything to do with it. He leaves, and Gandarte and Erissena come to Poro. Erissena tells him about Cleofide's forthcoming wedding with Alessandro. Poro leaves. Erissena asks Gandarte to help Poro.

Temple of Bacchus with a burning funeral pyre

Alessandro and Cleofide enter with their retinue. A few Bacchantes are walking in front of them and the temple priest with burning torches. Poro watches the scene from a distance. When Alessandro takes Cleofide's hand, she explains that this is the hour of her death, not her wedding. According to local custom, a widow has to follow her husband in death. She wants to hurry to the burning pyre, but is held back by Alessandro. Timagene brings Gandarte, whom he still thinks to be Poro, as a prisoner. Cleofide makes another attempt to throw herself into the flames. Poro, unable to bear her suffering, steps out, reveals himself and asks her forgiveness. He is ready to accept any punishment Alessandro metes out. Alessandro, however, forgives everyone and gives Poro his kingdom back, together with his wife and freedom. In return, Poro rewards Gandarte's steadfastness with the hand of his sister Erissena, and Alessandro gives him the land beyond the Ganges as a gift. The opera ends with a chorus of praise for the fame of Alessandro.

== Background ==
The story of Alexander the Great's encounter with Porus and the Battle of the Hydaspes has been related in many historical sources, notably in the fifth book of Arrian's Anabasis, Justin's excerpt from the twelfth book of Pompeius Trogus' Historiae Philippicae, Quintus Curtius Rufus' Histories of Alexander the Great and the chapter Alexander – Caesar from the Vitae parallelae by Plutarch.

In addition to these classical sources Metastasio also had more recent dramatic treatments to draw on. These included the 1648 play Porus ou La générosité d'Alexandre by Claude Boyer as well as Jean Racine's 1665 Alexandre le grand. Both of these versions introduced a love theme into the story just as Metastasio did. There are further similarities with Domenico David's 1691 L'amante eroe, set to music by Marc'Antonio Ziani and performed in Venice. David had already provided the model for Metastasio's first libretto Siface, re di Numidia.

Metastasio introduced several new elements to the story of Alexander and Porus in Alessandro nell'Indie. Firstly he introduced the jealousy motive with Porus, creating a tension between him and Cleofide not found in earlier works. He also introduced the new character of Timagene, and, with him, a revenge motive.

The libretto offers a typical example of the hierarchy of roles in an opera from around 1730. At the top is the ruler, here Alessandro. He is opposed by the first pair of lovers Cleofide and Poro. A second pair, Erissena and Gandarte, and the traitor Timagene, are subordinate to these figures. Each person embodies a different character type. The magnanimous Alessandro opposes the treacherous Timagene, and the couples also complement each other with their contrasting main features: the jealous Poro combines with the faithful Cleofide, the reliable Gandarte with the coquettish Erissena.

== Adaptations ==
Other important settings of the libretto included those by Johann Adolph Hasse, Luigi Gatti and Giovanni Pacini. Hasse's adaptation was entitled Cleofide to reflect the prominence it gave to the role of the heroine, played by Hasse's wife Faustina Bordoni. George Frideric Handel's 1731 treatment, (Poro), was particularly admired. To suit the tastes of a London audience he cut back the recitative; the first four scenes of Act 2 were also cut to move the action along. Handel replaced various arias in Metastasio's text with new ones which he considered to have greater dramatic expression. Furthermore, as the baritone who was to play Timagene, Giovanni Commano, was not a strong singer, so Handel cut much of the material his role was to have sung.

Handel's version was sung at least 27 times at the Hamburg Gänsemarkt-Oper under the title Triumph der Grossmuth und Treue, oder CLEOFIDA, Königin von Indien with a German translation of the recitative by Christoph Gottlieb Wend.

Metastasio also created a shortened version of the libretto in 1753 for his friend Farinelli (Carlo Broschi).

== Settings to music ==
The following composers used the libretto as the basis for an opera:

Year	Composer	Premiere (notes)	First performed
1729	Leonardo Vinci	2 January 1730, Teatro delle Dame, Rome. Also performed for Carnival 1731 at the Teatro San Sebastiano in Livorno (pasticcio); Carnival 1732 at the Teatro Moderno in Reggio Emilia; on 29 January 1732 at the Teatro Cocomero in Florence (pasticcio); Carnival 1733 at the Teatro dell'Accademia degli Erranti in Brescia; revised for Carnival 1734 at the Teatro Pascolini in Urbino; revised for Carnival 1735 at the Hoftheater Munich (with music by Johann Adolph Hasse and probably Giovanni Battista Ferrandini); revised for Carnival 1736 at the Teatro Ducale in Parma; 1740 at the Teatro in Lucca. (Note: Libretto of Leonardo Vinci's setting, Rome 1730 at the Internet Archive.) (Note: Score of Leonardo Vinci's setting at the International Music Score Library Project.)	Rome
1731	Luca Antonio Predieri	Carnival 1731, Teatro Regio Ducale, Milan. (Note: Libretto of Predieri's setting at the Museo internazionale e biblioteca della musica.)	Milan
1731	Nicola Antonio Porpora	Carnival 1731, Teatro Regio, Turin. as Poro	Turin
1731	George Frideric Handel → Poro	2 February 1731, King's Theatre as Poro, re dell'Indie with an English translation by Humphreys; 1732 in Hamburg as Triumph der Grossmuth und Treue, oder CLEOFIDA, Königin von Indien with a German translation of the recitative by Christoph Gottlieb Wend and recitatives by Georg Philipp Telemann; for the summer fair 1732 at the Opernhaus am Hagenmarkt, Brunswick, as Poro ed Alessandro; revised with music by Giovanni Alberto Ristori and Leonardo Vinci on 8 December 1736 at Covent Garden in London. (Note: Italian/English libretto of Handel's setting at the Internet Archive.) (Note: Italian/German libretto of Handel's setting, Brunswick 1732 at the Munich Digitization Center.) (Note: German libretto of Handel's setting, Hamburg 1732 at the Staatsbibliothek zu Berlin.) (Note: Score of Handel's setting, London 1731 at the Handel House Foundation.) (Note: Score of Handel's setting, Chrysander edition, Leipzig 1880 at the Munich Digitization Center.)	London
1731	Johann Adolph Hasse → Cleofide	13 September 1731, Hoftheater Libretto adapted by Michelangelo Boccardi as Cleophis or Cleofide; revised several times; also performed under its original title Alessandro nell'Indie; 1737 in Ferrara in a setting by Antonio Vivaldi; other performances until 1777 in Venice, Naples, Graz, Klagenfurt, Verona, Bratislava, Florence, Lucca and Berlin. (Note: Italian/German libretto of the setting by Johann Adolph Hasse, Dresden 1731, at the Munich Digitization Center.) (Note: Score of Hasse's setting at the Saxon State and University Library Dresden.)	Dresden
1732	Francesco Mancini	Carnival 1732, Teatro San Bartolomeo (Note: Italian libretto of Mancini's setting at the Munich Digitization Center.)	Naples
1732	Giovanni Battista Pescetti	30 January 1732, Teatro Sant'Angelo. (Note: Italian libretto of Pescetti's setting at the Munich Digitization Center.)	Venice
1733	Antonio Bioni	Carnival 1733, Theater im Ballhaus	Breslau
1734	Gaetano Maria Schiassi	20 February 1734, Teatro Formagliari (Note: Italian libretto of Schiassi's setting at the Museo internazionale e biblioteca della musica.) also in 1736 at the Academia da Trindade in Lisbon	Bologna
1734	Matteo Lucchini	Nuovo Teatro della Città Piccola	Prague
1736	Egidio Duni (authorship doubtful)	Carnival 1736, Teatro Pubblico	Prato
1736	Domenico Sarro	4 November 1736, Teatro San Bartolomeo also for Carnival 1743 at the Teatro San Carlo in Naples	Naples
1738	Baldassare Galuppi	Carnival 1738, Teatro Regio Ducale Nuovo (Note: Italian libretto of Galuppi's setting at the Museo internazionale e biblioteca della musica.) first version; also 1752 in Stuttgart and 1755 in Munich	Mantua
1738	Francesco Corselli	9 May 1738, Real Teatro del Buen Retiro (Note: Italian/Spanish libretto of Corselli's setting (Google Books).) for the wedding of King Charles of Naples with Maria Amalia of Saxony	Madrid
1739	anonymous	1739, Teatro di Piazza, Vicenza further performances of anonymous settings or pasticcios in 1741 in Erlangen; Summer 1741 at the Neues Theater in Bratislava; on 28 January 1748 at the Teatro Cocomero in Florence; Autumn 1750 at the Teatro Pubblico in Sassuolo; on 14 April 1752 at the Teatro Cocomero in Florence; on 13 October 1761 at the King's Theatre am Haymarket in London; on 21 May 1786 at the Teatro degli Intrepidi in Florence.	Vicenza
1740	Annibale Pio Fabri	January 1740, Teatro Condes	Lisbon
1742	Giuseppe Ferdinando Brivio	Carnival 1742, Teatro Regio Ducale	Milan
1743	Francesco Antonio Uttini	1743	Genoa
1743	Niccolò Jommelli	26 December 1743, Teatro Bonacossi (Note: Italian libretto of Jommelli's setting at the Museo internazionale e biblioteca della musica.) first version	Ferrara
1744	Davide Perez	Carnival 1744, Teatro Falcone (Note: Italian libretto of Perez's setting at the Internet Archive.) first version, also on 23 January 1752 at the Teatro Regio Ducale in Milan	Genoa
1744	Carl Heinrich Graun	21 December 1744, Königliche Hofoper (Note: Score of Graun's setting at the International Music Score Library Project.) as Alessandro e Poro; new production in 1784	Berlin
1744	Christoph Willibald Gluck	26 December 1744, Teatro Regio as Poro; only the Sinfonia, four arias and a duet survive.	Turin
1745	Pietro Chiarini	Carnival 1745, Teatro Filarmonico	Verona
1746	Pietro Pellegrini	1746, Novo Teatro, Brescia	Brescia
1747	Girolamo Abos	July and August 1747, Teatro La Fenice, Ancona (Note: Italian libretto of Abos' setting at the Museo internazionale e biblioteca della musica.) also in Autumn 1750 at the Teatro in Lucca	Ancona
1748	Georg Christoph Wagenseil	17 July 1748, Burgtheater German translation	Vienna
1749	Paolo Scalabrini	1749, Det Kongelige Teater	Copenhagen
1750	Giovanni Marco Rutini	Carnival 1750, Theater an der Kotzen, Prague	Prague
1750	Giuseppe Scolari	Carnival 1750, Teatro di Piazza, Vicenza also on 23 May 1759 at the Teatro Vendramin di San Salvatore in Venice	Vicenza
1752	Ignazio Fiorillo	1752, Opernhaus am Hagenmarkt, Brunswick	Brunswick
1752	Giacinto Calderara	1752, Palazzo del marchese Solerio, Alessandria	Alessandria
1752	Gaetano Latilla	around 26 December 1752, Teatro San Cassiano; also contained music by other composers	Venice
1753	Giuseppe Scarlatti	12 May 1753, Teatro Pubblico	Reggio Emilia
1754	Giuseppe Santarelli	1754	Terni
1754	Johann Friedrich Agricola	Carnival 1754, Königliche Hofoper as Cleofide	Berlin
1754	Baldassare Galuppi	20 January 1754, Teatro San Carlo second version	Naples
1755	Baldassare Galuppi	Carnival 1755 (Note: Italian libretto of Galuppi's setting at the Museo internazionale e biblioteca della musica.) third version; also on Ascension Day 1755 at the Teatro San Samuele in Venice; adapted on 12 October 1755 in Munich; other performances in subsequent years in Brescia, Lodi, Florence, Vicenza and Padua.	Parma
1755	Davide Perez	31 March 1755, Ópera do Tejo second version, for the opening of the opera house; also 1764 in Cádiz	Lisbon
1755	Francesco Araja	18.–29. December 1755, Hermitage Theater (Note: Italian libretto of Araja's setting at the Göttinger Digitalisierungszentrum.) also 1759 in Oranienbaum	St Petersburg
1758	Niccolò Piccinni	21 January 1758, Teatro Argentina first version, also in the Summer of 1762 at the Teatro di Santa Cecilia in Palermo	Rome
1759	Ignaz Holzbauer	Carnival 1759, Teatro Regio Ducale	Milan
1760	Niccolò Jommelli	11 February 1760, Herzogliches Theater second version; adapted by João Cordeiro da Silva on 6 June 1776 in Lisbon	Stuttgart
1761	Daniel Dal Barba	Carnival 1761, Teatro Filarmonico	Verona
1761	Giuseppe Sarti	Autumn 1761, Det Kongelige Teater first version; adapted in June 1766 for the Nuovo Teatro in Padua	Copenhagen
1761	Gioacchino Cocchi	13 October 1761, King's Theatre	London
1762	Johann Christian Bach	20 January 1762, Teatro San Carlo also Carnival 1778 at the Teatro in Lodi	Naples
1762	Tommaso Traetta	29 April 1762, Teatro Pubblico	Reggio Emilia
1763	Giovan Gualberto Brunetti	Carnival 1763, Teatro Pubblico	Pisa
1763	Antonio Sacchini	Ascension fair 1763, Teatro San Salvatore first version; also Carnival 1766 at the Teatro Regio in Turin	Venice
1764	Domenico Fischietti	Carnival 1764, Theater an der Kotzen	Prague
1764	Gregorio Sciroli	31 May 1764, Teatro Comunale (Note: Italian libretto of Sciroli's setting at the Museo internazionale e biblioteca della musica.) also Carnival 1774 at the Accademia degli Intronati in Siena	Bologna
1766	Gian Francesco de Majo	5 November 1766, Hoftheater Libretto adapted by Mattia Verazi	Mannheim
1768	Johann Gottlieb Naumann	not performed; composed for the Teatro San Benedetto	Venice
1768	Luigi Gatti	24 June 1768, Teatro Regio Ducale Vecchio	Mantua
1768	Antonio Sacchini	Summer 1768, Teatro San Carlo second version; also Carnival 1771 at the Teatro San Sebastiano in Livorno; Carnival 1773 at the Teatro de' Nobili in Perugia	Naples
1769	Ferdinando Bertoni	Spring 1769, Teatro Falcone also on 26 December 1770 at the Teatro San Benedetto in Venice	Genoa
1769	Jan Antonín Koželuh	Winter 1769, Königliches Theater	Prague
1772	Pasquale Anfossi	7 January 1772, Teatro Argentina (Note: Italian libretto of Anfossi's setting at the Library of Congress.) also on 4 November 1772 at the Teatro della Pergola in Florence	Rome
1773	Giovanni Paisiello	26 December 1773, Teatro di Corte	Modena
1774	Niccolò Piccinni	12 January 1774, Teatro San Carlo second version; also on 26 December 1776 at the Teatro della Pergola in Florence; also on 12 January 1792 at the Teatro San Carlo in Naples	Naples
1774	Domenico Corri	3 December 1774, King's Theatre Libretto adapted by Giovan Gualberto Bottarelli	London
1775	Carlo Ignazio Monza	28 January 1775 Teatro Regio Ducale also 1776 in Alessandria	Milan
1775	Giacomo Rust	Ascension 1775, Teatro San Samuele (Note: Italian libretto of the Rust setting at the Museo internazionale e biblioteca della musica.)	Venice
1778	Luigi Marescalchi	27 May 1778, Teatro San Benedetto	Venice
1778	Michele Mortellari	22 July 1778, Accademia degli Intronati also in the Autumn of 1783 at the Teatro Pubblico in Lucca	Siena
1778	Melchiorre de Vincenti or Giuseppe de Vincenti	October fair 1778, Teatro Civico, Alessandria	Alessandria
1779	Antonio Calegari	Carnival 1779, Teatro Filarmonico	Verona
1781	Domenico Cimarosa	11 February 1781, Teatro Argentina	Rome
1784	Luigi Cherubini	April 1784, Teatro Regio Ducale Nuovo two acts; also Carnival 1786 at the Teatro della Nobile Associazione in Cremona; Autumn 1788 at the Teatro degli Armeni in Livorno	Mantua
1785	Vincenzo Chiavacci	1785, Teatro Sant'Agostino	Genoa
1785	Francesco Bianchi	28 January 1785, Teatro San Benedetto Further performances until 1795 in Trieste, Eszterháza, Verona, Bologna, Bergamo, Venice and Udine	Venice
1787	Luigi Caruso	Carnival 1787, Teatro delle Dame also Carnival 1791 at the Teatro San Samuele in Venice; 1796 at the Teatro di San Giacomo in Corfu; on 24 June 1800 at the Teatro San Carlo in Naples	Rome
1787	Giuseppe Sarti	Winter 1787, Teatro di Santa Cecilia (Note: Italian libretto of Sarti's setting at the Museo internazionale e biblioteca della musica.) second version	Palermo
1788	Angelo Tarchi	Carnival 1788, Teatro alla Scala (Note: Italian libretto of Tarchi's setting at the Munich Digitization Center.) also 1789 at the King's Theatre in London; Summer 1791 adapted by Carlo Francesco Badini as La generosità di Alessandro in Siena; Autumn 1791 in Livorno; other versions on 20 January 1798 at the Teatro Regio in Turin and January 1802 at the Teatro della Pergola in Florence	Milan
1789	Pietro Alessandro Guglielmi	4 November 1789, Teatro San Carlo (Note: Italian libretto of Guglielmi's setting at the Museo internazionale e biblioteca della musica.)	Naples
1800	Francesco Gnecco	1800, Teatro degli Avvalorati	Livorno
1811	Johann Peter Ritter	26 December 1811, Hof-und Nationaltheater Grand heroic opera in 2 acts, libretto freely adapted by Georg Christian Römer as Alexander in Indien (Die Macedonier am Indus)	Mannheim
1824	Giovanni Pacini → Alessandro nelle Indie	29 September 1824, Teatro San Carlo (Note: Italian libretto of Pacini's setting at the Museo internazionale e biblioteca della musica.) Libretto adapted by Giovanni Schmidt; also on 26 December 1826 at the Teatro alla Scala in Milan; 1827 at the Teatro Carolino in Palermo; on 19 January 1828 at the Teatro La Fenice in Venice	Naples

== Recent performances and recordings ==
- Johann Christian Bach: 2000: Performed in the Schlosstheater Sanssouci in Potsdam, Akademie für Alte Musik Berlin.
- Baldassare Galuppi: 2015: Performed at the Mainfranken Theater Würzburg.
- George Frideric Handel: 1956, 1957 and 1959: Performed at the Händel-Festspiele Halle, also recorded, by the Händelfestspielorchester Halle. 1994: Concert performance at the Opéra de Monte-Carlo, recorded on CD by Europa Galante. 2006: Performed at the Deutsches Theater Göttingen, recorded on CD by the Akademie für Alte Musik Berlin.
- Johann Adolph Hasse: 1986/1992: CD. Cappella Coloniensis, Rheinische Kantorei. 1994: Concert performance at the Théâtre du Châtelet Paris, the Konzerthaus Vienna and in Montreux. Les Arts Florissants, Leitung: William Christie. 2005-2009: Performed at the Semperoper, Dresden. Staatsopernchor und Staatskapelle Dresden.
- Gian Francesco de Majo: 2008: Performed at the Nationaltheater Mannheim, recorded on CD. Nationaltheater-Orchester Mannheim.
- Giovanni Pacini: 2007: CD. London Philharmonic Orchestra, Geoffrey Mitchell Choir.
- Leonardo Vinci: Arte TV broadcast of the 2022 Bayreuth production of Alessandro nel Indie
