= List of operas by Johann Adolph Hasse =

This is a complete list of operas by Johann Adolph Hasse (1699–1783).

== List ==
Title	Genre	Subdivisions	Libretto	Première date	Place, theatre
Antioco (incompletely preserved)	opera seria	3 acts	Apostolo Zeno and Pietro Pariati	11 August 1721	Braunschweig
Antonio e Cleopatra	serenata	2 parts	Francesco Ricciardi	September 1725	Naples
Il Sesostrate	opera seria	3 acts	Apostolo Zeno and Pietro Pariati's Sesostri, adapted by Angelo Carasale	13 May 1726	Naples
La Semele, o sia La richiesta fatale	serenata	2 parts	Francesco Ricciardi	Autumn 1726	Naples
L'Astarto	opera seria	3 acts	Apostolo Zeno and Pietro Pariati, adapted by Angelo Carasale	December 1726	Naples
Gerone tiranno di Siracusa	opera seria	3 acts	Aurelio Aureli	19 November 1727	Naples
Enea in Caonia	serenata	2 parts	Luigi Maria Stampiglia	1727	Naples
Attalo, re di Bitinia	opera seria	3 acts	Francesco Silvani	May 1728	Naples
L'Ulderica (incompletely preserved)	opera seria	3 acts	unknown	29 January 1729	Naples
La sorella amante	commedia per musica	2 acts	Bernardo Saddumene	Easter 1729	Naples
Tigrane	opera seria	3 acts	Francesco Silvani	4 November 1729	Naples, Teatro San Bartolomeo
L'Erminia		2 acts	Bernardo Saddumene	Winter 1729	Naples
Artaserse	opera seria	3 acts	Metastasio	February 1730; second version: 9 September 1740; third version: 1760	Venice, Teatro San Giovanni Crisostomo; second version: Dresden; third version: Naples
Dalisa (incompletely preserved)	opera seria	3 acts	Domenico Lalli, after Nicolò Minato	17 May 1730	Venice, Teatro San Samuele
Arminio (incompletely preserved)	opera seria	3 acts	Antonio Salvi	28 August 1730	Milan
Ezio	opera seria	3 acts	Metastasio	Autumn 1730; second version: 1755	Naples; second version: Dresden
Cleofide	opera seria	3 acts	Michelangelo Boccardi, after Metastasio's Alessandro nell'Indie	13 September 1731	Dresden, Hoftheater
Catone in Utica (incompletely preserved)	opera seria	3 acts	Metastasio	26 December 1731	Turin
Cajo Fabricio	opera seria	3 acts	Apostolo Zeno	12 January 1732; second version: 8 July 1734	Rome; second version: Dresden
Demetrio	opera seria	3 acts	Metastasio	Carnival 1732; second version: 8 February 1740	Venice, Teatro San Giovanni Crisostomo; second version: Dresden
Euristeo	opera seria	3 acts	Apostolo Zeno, adapted by Domenico Lalli	May 1732	Venice
Issipile	opera seria	3 acts	Metastasio	1 October 1732	Naples
Siroe, re di Persia	opera seria	3 acts	Metastasio	2 May 1733; second version: 1763	Bologna; second version: Dresden
Sei tu, Lidippe, o il sole	serenata	1 act	Stefano Benedetto Pallavicino	2 August 1734	Dresden
Tito Vespasiano (La clemenza di Tito)	opera seria	3 acts	Metastasio	24 September 1735; second version: 17 January 1738; third version: 1759	Pesaro; second version: Dresden; third version: Naples
Alessandro nell'Indie	opera seria	3 acts	Metastasio	1736	Venice
Senocrita	opera seria	5 acts	Stefano Benedetto Pallavicino	27 February 1737	Dresden
Atalanta	opera seria	3 acts	Stefano Benedetto Pallavicino	26 July 1737	Dresden
Asteria	favola pastorale	3 acts	Stefano Benedetto Pallavicino	3 August 1737	Dresden
Irene	opera seria	3 acts	Stefano Benedetto Pallavicino	8 February 1738	Dresden
Alfonso	opera seria	5 acts	Stefano Benedetto Pallavicino	11 May 1738	Dresden
Viriate	opera seria	3 acts	Domenico Lalli after Metastasio's Siface	Carnival 1739	Venice
Numa Pompilio	opera seria	3 acts	Stefano Benedetto Pallavicino	7 October 1741	Hubertusburg
Pimpinella e Marcantonio	intermezzo	1 act	unknown	1741	Dresden
Lucio Papirio	opera seria	3 acts	Apostolo Zeno	18 January 1742	Dresden
Didone abbandonata	opera seria	3 acts	Metastasio, adapted by Francesco Algarotti	7 October 1742; second version: 4 February 1743	Hubertusburg; second version: Dresden
Asilo d'amore	festa teatrale	1 act	Metastasio	7 October 1743	Hubertusburg
Antigono	opera seria	3 acts	Metastasio	10 October 1743	Hubertusburg
Ipermestra	opera seria	3 acts	Metastasio	8 January 1744; second version: 7 October 1751	Vienna; second version: Hubertusburg
Semiramide riconosciuta	opera seria	3 acts	Metastasio	26 December 1744; second version: 11 January 1747	Venice, Teatro San Giovanni Crisostomo; second version: Dresden
Arminio	opera seria	3 acts	Giovanni Claudio Pasquini	7 October 1745; second version: 8 January 1753	Dresden (both versions)
La spartana generosa, ovvero Archidamia	opera seria	3 acts	Giovanni Claudio Pasquini	14 June 1747	Dresden
Leucippo	favola pastorale	3 acts	Giovanni Claudio Pasquini	7 October 1747; second version: 7 January 1751; third version: 1757	Hubertusburg; second version: Dresden; third version: Schwetzingen
Demofoonte	opera seria	3 acts	Metastasio (Demofonte)	9 February 1748; second version: Carnival 1749; third version: 1758	Dresden; second version: Venice; third version: Naples
Il natal di Giove	serenata	1 act	Metastasio	7 October 1749	Hubertusburg
Attilio Regolo	opera seria	3 acts	Metastasio	12 January 1750	Dresden
Endimione	festa teatrale	2 acts	after Metastasio	around 1750	Warsaw
Ciro riconosciuto	opera seria	3 acts	Metastasio	20 January 1751; second version: 17 January 1762	Dresden; second version: Warsaw
Adriano in Siria	opera seria	3 acts	Metastasio	17 January 1752	Dresden
Solimano	opera seria	3 acts	Giovanni Ambrogio Migliavacca	5 February 1753	Dresden
L'eroe cinese	opera seria	3 acts	Metastasio	7 October 1753	Hubertusburg
Artemisia	opera seria	3 acts	Giovanni Ambrogio Migliavacca	6 February 1754	Dresden
Ezio (revision of the 1730 version)	opera seria	3 acts	Metastasio, adapted by Giovanni Ambrogio Migliavacca	20 January 1755	Dresden
Il re pastore	opera seria	3 acts	Metastasio	7 October 1755; second version: 7 October 1762	Hubertusburg; second version: Warsaw
L'Olimpiade	opera seria	3 acts	Metastasio	16 February 1756; second version: 26 December 1764	Dresden; second version: Turin
Nitteti	opera seria	3 acts	Metastasio	Carnival 1758; second version: 3 August 1759	Venice; second version: Warsaw
Il sogno di Scipione	azione teatrale	1 act	Metastasio	7 October 1758	Warsaw
Demofoonte (revision of the 1748 version)	opera seria	3 acts	Metastasio	4 November 1758	Naples
La clemenza di Tito (revision of the 1735 version)	opera seria	3 acts	Metastasio	20 January 1759	Naples
Achille in Sciro	opera seria	3 acts	Metastasio	4 November 1759	Naples
Artaserse (revision of the 1730 version)	opera seria	3 acts	Metastasio	26 or 27 January 1760	Naples
Alcide al Bivio	festa teatrale	1 act	Metastasio	7 October 1760 (in celebration of the marriage of Archduke Joseph II, Holy Roman Emperor and Princess Isabella Maria of Parma)	Vienna, Hofburg
Zenobia	opera seria	3 acts	Metastasio	7 October 1761	Warsaw
Il trionfo di Clelia	opera seria	3 acts	Metastasio	27 April 1762; second version: 3 August 1762	Vienna, Burgtheater; second version: Warsaw
Siroe (revision of the 1733 version)	opera seria	3 acts	Metastasio	3 August 1763	Dresden
Egeria	festa teatrale	1 act	Metastasio	24 April 1764	Vienna
Romolo ed Ersilia	opera seria	3 acts	Metastasio	6 August 1765	Innsbruck
Partenope	festa teatrale	2 acts	Metastasio	9 September 1767	Vienna, Burgtheater
Piramo e Tisbe	intermezzo tragico	2 acts	Marco Coltellini	November 1768	Vienna, Burgtheater
Ruggiero (Il Ruggiero, ovvero L'eroica gratitudine)	opera seria	3 acts	Metastasio after Ludovico Ariosto	16 October 1771	Milan

== Sources ==
- Hansell, Sven (2001). "Hasse, Johann Adolf [Adolph]". Grove Music Online (8th ed.). Oxford University Press. doi:10.1093/omo/9781561592630.013.90000380289. ISBN 978-1-56159-263-0. (subscription, Wikilibrary access, or UK public library membership required)
