= Solimano =

1753 opera by Johann Adolph Hasse

- Opera by Johann Adolph Hasse
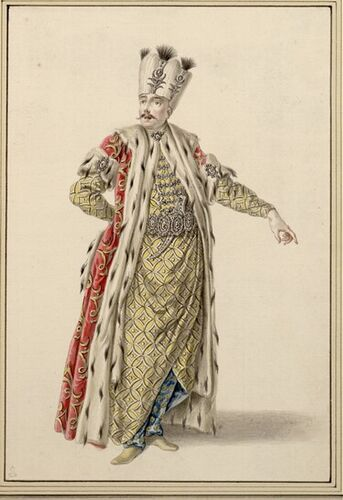
- Angelo Amorevoli as Solimano in the premiere production (costume by Francesco Ponte)
- Librettist: Giovanni Ambrogio Migliavacca
- Premiere: 5 February 1753; Opernhaus am Zwinger, Dresden

Solimano is an opera in three acts composed by Johann Adolph Hasse to an Italian-language libretto by Giovanni Ambrogio Migliavacca. Loosely based on an episode in the life of Suleiman the Magnificent, the opera premiered on 5 February 1753 at the Opernhaus am Zwinger in Dresden. The lavish production featured set designs by Giuseppe Galli Bibiena. The tenor Angelo Amorevoli sang the title role.

== Background ==
Hasse was a favorite of Duchess Maria Antonia of Bavaria and composed multiple operas for her court in Dresden, beginning with La Spartana generosa performed in 1747 to celebrate her betrothal to Frederick Christian, Elector of Saxony. His librettist for Solimano, Giovanni Ambrogio Migliavacca, was a student and protégé of Metastasio. Migliavacca's libretto was loosely based on the early 17th-century tragedy Il Solimano by Prospero Bonarelli della Rovere, which in turn was loosely based on an episode in the life of Suleiman the Magnificent who had his eldest son Mustafa killed as a traitor. In the opera Mustafa's name is changed to "Selim" while his younger half-brother and rival Cihangir becomes "Osmino". Roxelana, Suleiman's consort and Osmino (Cihangir)'s mother, was a central character in Bonarelli's play, but she is only alluded to in the opera. Migliavacca also changed the tragic ending. In the opera Suleiman recognizes his folly in believing Selim (Mustafa) to be a traitor and spares his life. The two brothers are reconciled and marry the Persian princesses Narsea and Emira with whom they had fallen in love.

== Performance history ==
Solimano premiered on 5 February 1753 at the Opernhaus am Zwinger. The production designed by Giuseppe Galli Bibiena with costumes by Francesco Ponte was a lavish spectacle with real horses, camels and elephants on stage and hundreds of extras in addition to the seven main singers and the chorus of soldiers. The final scene, a brilliantly lit Turkish camp at night, had ships sailing on the River Tigris with the Hanging Gardens of Babylon in the distance. The opera ran for twelve performances, and according to contemporary accounts, the ladies of the Dresden Court paid the Swiss Guards to hold their places in the opera house so they revisit the most spectacular scenes on each evening it was performed. Hasse revised the score when Solimano was revived at the Opernhaus am Zwinger in January 1754. Solimano proved to be Migliavacca's most successful libretto and was subsequently set by several other composers, including Fischietti (1755), Pescetti (1756), Perez (1757), and Galuppi (1760).

The opera received its first performance in modern times on 16 August 1997 at the Innsbruck Festival of Early Music in a production conducted by René Jacobs and directed by Georg Quander. Thomas Randle sang the title role with mezzo-soprano Iris Vermillion as Selim. A recording of the performance was broadcast on BBC Radio 3 the following December. In February 1999 Jacobs conducted the same production at the Berlin Staatsoper to mark the tricentennial of Hasse's birth. On that occasion Thomas Randle reprised the title role while Vivica Genaux sang the role of Selim. In his review of the Berlin performance critic George Loomis wrote: "Hasse's arias emerged as not just musical pleasantries, but also vital studies in character. Intense rhythmic energy conveys Solimano's volatile nature, soothing melodic pathos defines his wrongly accused son, Selim."

== Roles ==
Roles, voive types, premiere cast
Role	Voice type (Note: In the 1997 revival at Innsbruck, the original castrato roles of Selim, Osmino, and Acomate were sung by a mezzo-soprano, a countertenor, and a tenor respectively.)	Premiere cast, 5 February 1753
Solimano (Suleiman the Magnificent), Sultan of the Ottoman Empire	tenor	Angelo Amorevoli
Selim, Solimano's eldest son, born from a previous consort	castrato	Angelo Maria Monticelli
Osmino, Solimano's younger son, born from his consort, Roxelana	castrato	Bartolomeo Puttini
Narsea, daughter of the Shah of Persia and a prisoner of the Turks	contralto	Teresa Albuzzi
Emira, Narsea's sister and fellow prisoner	soprano	Caterina Pilaja
Acomate, General of Solimano's Janissaries	castrato	Giuseppe Belli
Rusteno, Grand Vizir and Roxelana's son-in-law	bass	Antonio Fürich
Soldiers, slaves, courtiers, pages, guards

== Recordings ==
There are no complete commercial recordings of Solimano. However Selim's act 2 aria "Fra quest'ombre" sung by Vivica Genaux can be heard on Decca's Baroque Divas and one of the sinfonias from the opera transcribed for lute can be heard on the Oehms Classics recording Opera for Lute. The act 1 triumph scene ("Marcia alla Turca" and the soldiers' chorus "Viva il prode, viva il forte") appears on Phoenix Edition's 1001 Nights: Breezes From The Orient performed by the Berlin Radio Orchestra and Choir.
