= Solimano (Perez) =

1757 opera by Davide Perez

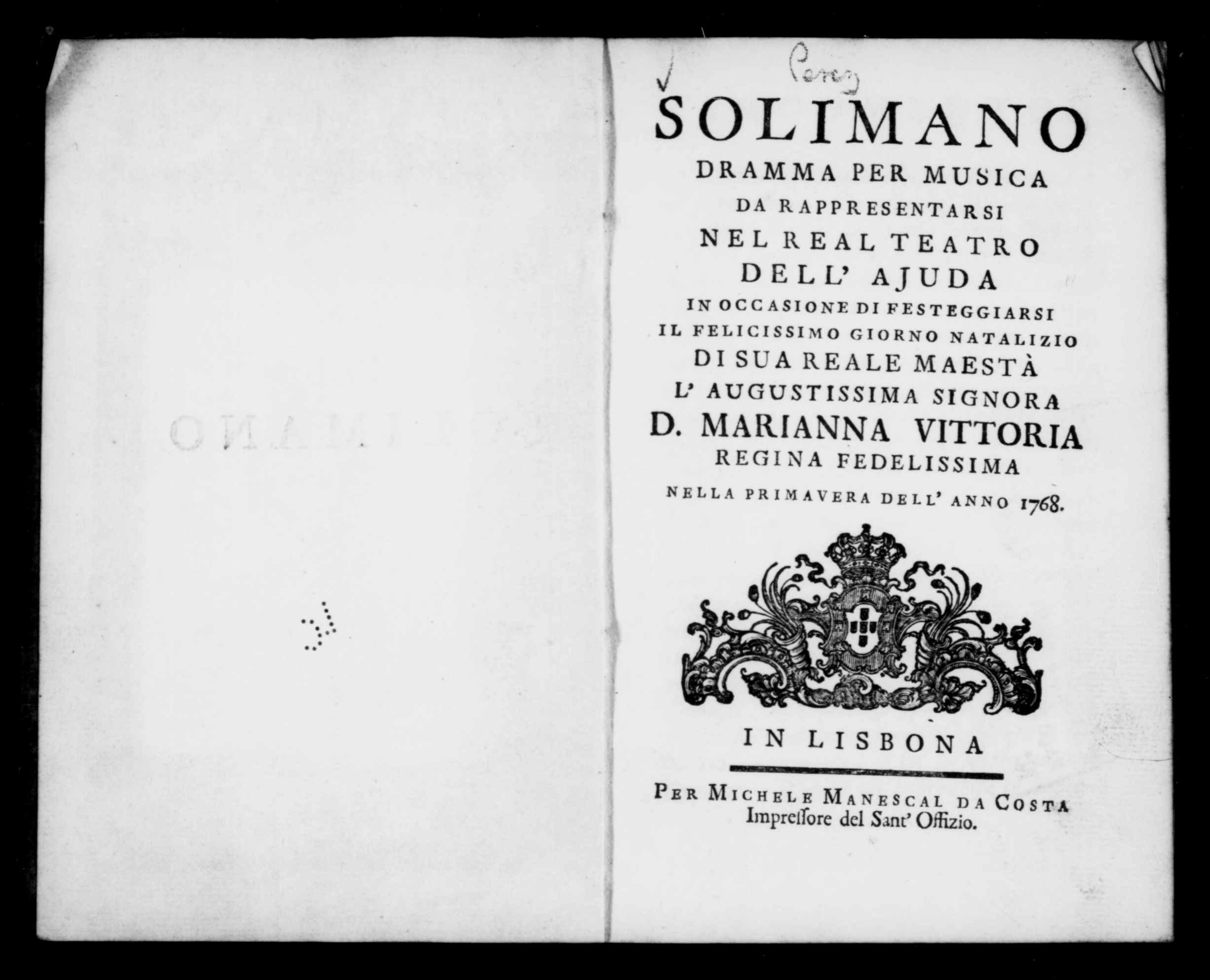
Frontispiece of Perez's Solimano (1768)

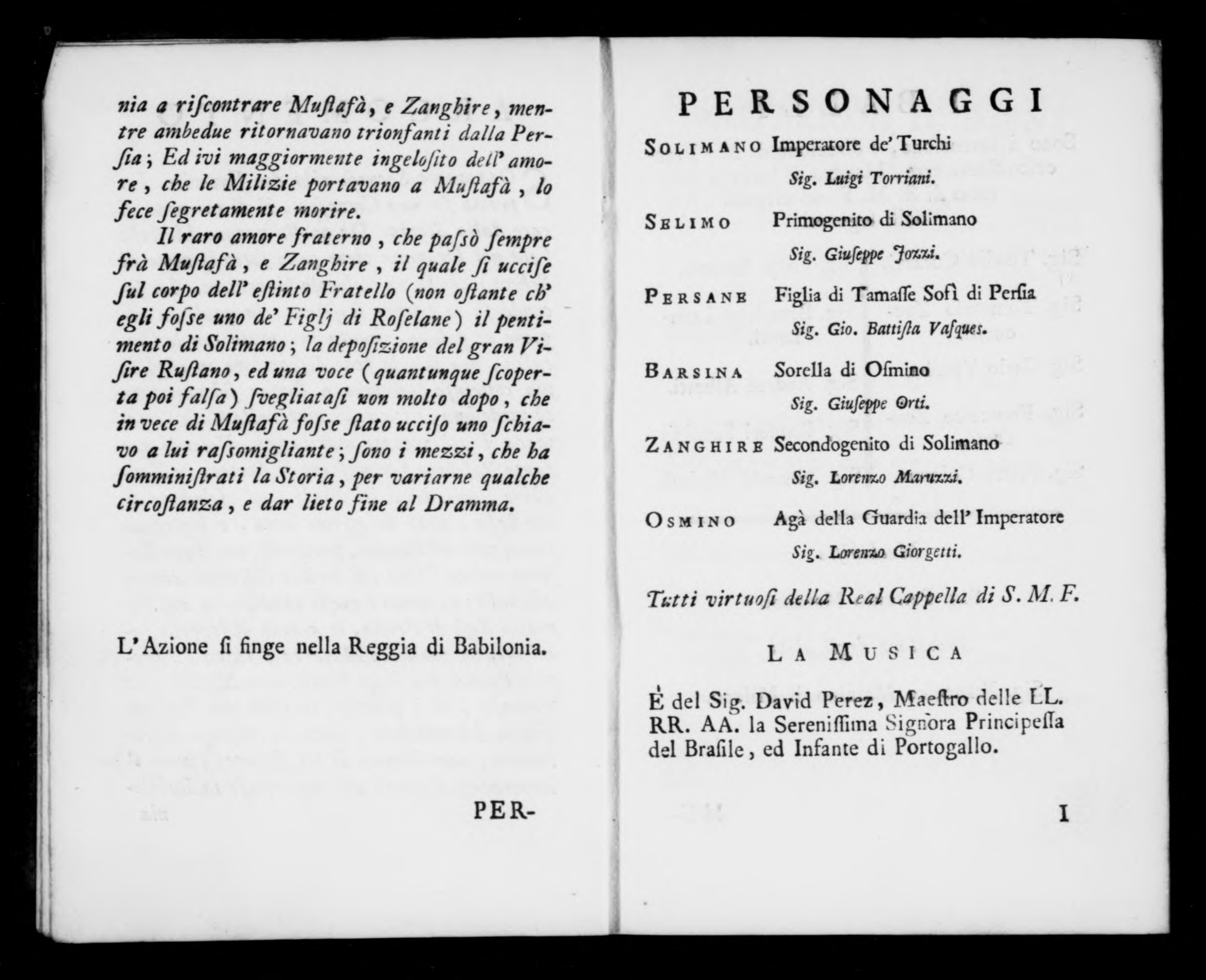
Original cast of Perez's Solimano (1768)

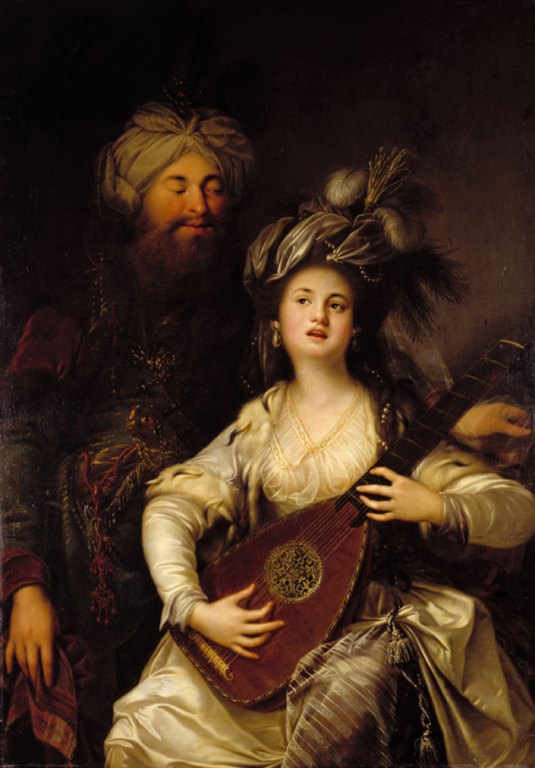
Suleiman the Magnificent and Hürrem Sultan

Solimano is a Baroque opera in three acts by Davide Perez (1711–1778). A first version was premiered for the carnival in 1757 in the Palace of Ajuda in Lisbon. The revised version of 1768 performed for the birthday of Mariana Victoria of Spain is however much more widely known.

== Action ==
A previous work entitled Solimano (1753) by Johann Adolph Hasse based on the libretto by Giovanni Ambrogio Migliavacca told the tale of two pairs of Turkish and Persian lovers. Perez's version has two Turkish-Turkish couples instead.

The Turkish sultan Solimano (Suleiman the Magnificent) has sent his eldest son Selimo (Selim II) and his half-brother Zanghire (Şehzade Cihangir) into the war against the Shah of Persia, Tamasse (Tahmasp I). As a result of the campaign, Selimo is to marry the daughter of the Shah, Persane, and become ruler of Turkey and Persia. The current sultana Roselane (Hürrem Sultan), mother of Zanghire and stepmother of Selimo, together with Grand Vizier Rustano (Rüstem Pasha) intrigue to eliminate Selimo and to make Zanghire sultan. Solimano goes to Babylon with Osmino and his sister Barsina, who is engaged to Zanghire. There Zanghire proves to be loyal to his brother, reveals the intrigue and kills Rustano. Selimo and his father are reconciled and both original lovers (Selimo and Persane, Zanghire and Barsina) are allowed to marry.

== Second version ==
The second version was noteworthy in moving forward the reforms taking place in opera style in the mid-18th century. It contains elements of baroque-style opera seria but mixes them with elements of opera buffa. Compared with traditional Metastasian operatic aesthetics, the libretto for Solimano allowed greater fluency and emotional sensitivity.

Many typical features of baroque opera are attenuated in this version. The ritornelli in each aria are much briefer, and exit arias are often absent. The recitative is mostly orchestrated throughout rather than "secco", and many ensembles are through-composed, combining aria, recitative and chorus in an integrated whole. The vocal lines were generally written to be delivered in a smooth cantabile style, while the orchestral parts supporting them called for a more detached execution.

== Premiere cast ==
The cast of the first performance of the second version were:

Luigi Torriani (Solimano), Giuseppe Jozzi (Selimo), Giovanni Battista Vazques (Persane), Giuseppe Orsi (Barsina), Lorenzo Maruzzi (Zanghire), Lorenzo Giorgetti (Osmino).

== Modern revival ==
Modern performances of the 1768 version took place in 2010 and again in 2011 under Juan Bautista Otero, with the Real Compañía Ópera de Cámara as part of the Granada Music Festival.
