= GDZ =

GDZ may refer to:

- Center for Retrospective Digitization (Göttinger DigitalisierungsZentrum), an online system for archiving academic journals maintained by the University of Göttingen
- GDZ, the IATA code for Gelendzhik Airport, Krasnodar Krai, Russia
