= Giovanni Marco Rutini =

Italian composer

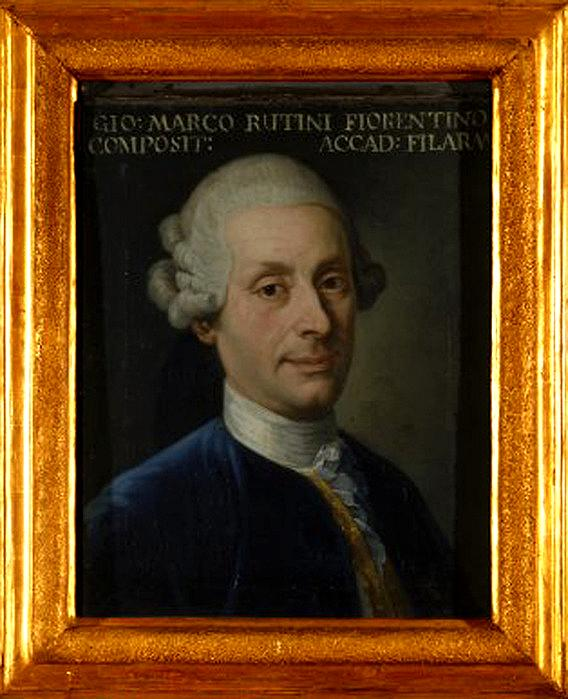
Giovanni Marco Rutini

Giovanni Marco Rutini (25 April 1723 – 22 December 1797) was an Italian composer. He is most known for his sonatas which influenced Wolfgang Amadeus Mozart and Joseph Haydn.

== Biography ==
He was born in Florence and studied at the Naples Conservatorio della Pietà dei Turchini. At the conservatorio, he studied composition under the guidance of Leonardo Leo, harpsichord with Nicola Fago and violin with Vito Antonio Pagliarulo. He graduated in 1744, but stayed to teach for several years. In 1748 he moved to Prague and joined the Locatelli ensemble. In the beginnings of his career he devoted himself mainly to the kapellmeister activities, and composed predominantly the cembalo sonatas. Rutini performed his first "Prague opera", Alessandro nell´Indie, in 1750. Another opera, Semiramide riconosciuta, was dedicated to the "nobility of the Czech Kingdom". Rutini later moved with Locatelli and his group to Russian St. Petersburg. He composed there the comic operas, mainly to the librettos of Carlo Goldoni. He was also the piano teacher of Catherine II, the future Russian empress. In the early 1760s he returned to Florence, and continued composing operas. He married in April 1761. He continued to conduct performances at the Teatro degli Intrepidi in Florence until 1784, but at the same time he devoted himself only to composing oratorios and keyboard sonatas; after 1780, he composed mainly church music. He was a friend and correspondent of Padre Martini.

The manuscripts of his operas are stored in the Landesbibliothek in Dresden, in the library of the Florence conservatory, and also in Civico Museo Bibliographico in Bologna.

== Legacy ==
Rutini's harpsichord production had a certain historical importance. He was in fact one of the main composers of keyboard music of the time and, like his contemporary Mattia Vento, was highly appreciated by his contemporaries. His sonatas, belonging to the transitional age from the harpsichord to the fortepiano, present a variable number of movements and often end with a minuet. His non-incisive and expressive themes contributed greatly to the development of the classical style, so much so that Mozart showed a certain interest in the sonatas of the Italian composer.

The other works of the Florentine composer, on the other hand, are almost totally unknown to current critics and await more detailed studies (the only one who commented on one of his works was Andrea Della Corte). In addition to his compositional activity, Rutini was also a teacher and founder of the Leopoldian School of Florentine Composers, to which his son Ferdinando belonged, among others.

== Operas ==
- Alessandro nell'Indie (to the libretto of Pietro Metastasio, 1750, Prague)
- Semiramide (to the libretto of Pietro Metastasio, 1752, Prague)
- Il retiro degli dei (to the libretto of Giovanni Battista Locatelli, 1757, St. Peterburg)
- Il negligente (to the libretto of Carlo Goldoni, 1758, St. Peterburg)
- Il caffè di campagna (to the libretto of Pietro Chiari, 1762, Bologna)
- I matrimoni in maschera (Gli sposi in maschera; Il tutore burlato) (to the libretto of F. Casorri, 1763, Cremona)
- Ezio (to the libretto of Pietro Metastasio, 1763, Florence)
- L'olandese in Italia (to the libretto of N. Tassoi, 1765, Florence)
- L'amore industrioso (to the libretto of G. Casorri, 1765, Venice)
- Il contadino incivilito (to the libretto of O. Goretti, 1766, Florence)
- Le contese domestiche (Le contese deluse) (intermezzo, 1766, Florence)
- L'amor tra l'armi (to the libretto of N. Tassi, 1768, Siena)
- Faloppa mercante (Gli sponsali di Faloppa) (1769, Florence)
- La Nitteti (to the libretto of Pietro Metastasio, 1770, Modena)
- L'amor per rigiro (to the libretto of N. Tassi, 1773, Florence)
- Vologeso re de' Parti (to the libretto of Apostolo Zeno, 1775, Florence)
- Sicotencal (to the libretto of C. Olivieri, 1776, Turin)
- Il finto amante (1776, Pistoia)
- Gli stravaganti
