= Giuseppe Belli (singer) =

Italian castrato-soprano singer at the Saxon court

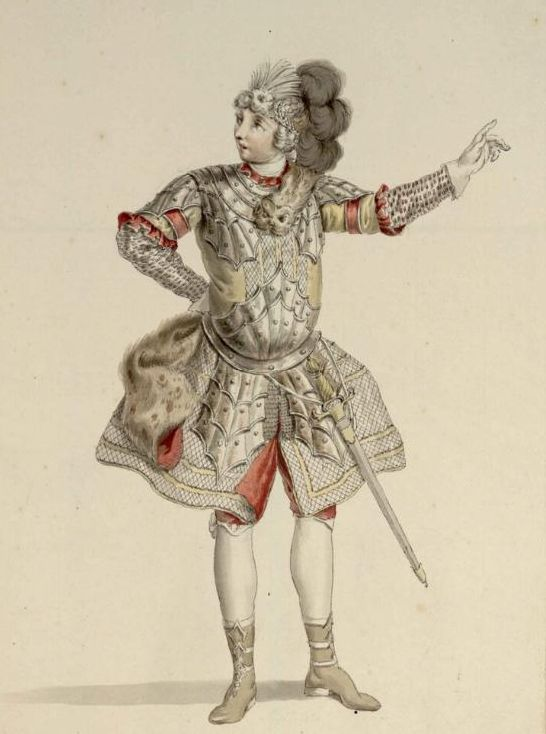
Giuseppe Belli as Segimiro in Hasse's opera Arminio (costume design by Francesco Ponte; Dresden 1753)

Giuseppe Belli, also Giovanni Belli, also known as 'Il Cortonesino' (born 1732 in Cortona; died 19 January 1760) was an Italian castrato-soprano singer at the Saxon court.

== Life ==
In 1752 Belli replaced the castrato Giovanni Bindi who had died in 1750 as secundo uomo in Dresden. That was the beginning of his career. During the Seven Years' War he returned to Italy, and died in Naples at the beginning of 1760, when he was fatally stabbed one day before the premiere of Johann Adolph Hasse's new opera.

During his time in Dresden, he performed at the following operas by Hasse:

- Arminio ( January 1753 in Dresden) - as Segimiro (his first role in Saxony)
- Solimano ( February 1753 in Dresden) - as Acomate
- L'eroe cinese (7 October 1753 in Hubertusburg) - as Minteo
- Artemisia (6 February 1754 in Dresden) - as Idaspe
- Ezio (20 January 1755 in Dresden) - as Varo
- Il re pastore ( 7 October 1755 in Hubertusburg, second time on 7 October 1762 in Warsaw) - as Agenore
- L'olimpiade (16 February 1756 in Dresden and in Turin) - as Licida

Ernst Ludwig Gerber relates that he "moved everyone to tears" with Licida's aria Consola il genitore. This aria was especially written for him by Hasse. Gottlieb Wilhelm Rabener called him in a letter to his friend "the divine" Belli. Belli was also loved for his incredible beauty (by German men and women equally). He was tall (as all castrati were), lean, with pale complexion, face like an angel and big eyes. As Johann Joachim Winckelmann reports in a letter to his friend on 30 September 1758:

"In the evening I am going to the opera [....] I am in Dresden, for the Pilaja is singing, and Lenzi and his wife are dancing. The beautiful, indeed the most beautiful, Belli is going to sing today"

But when the Seven Years' War started, he, Hasse and many other singers went to Italy. Belli remained in contact with Hasse and continued to sing for him. But one day before the premiere of Hasse's new opera (or rather, newly-rewritten opera) Artaserse, Belli died, stabbed by a jealous Venetian, as Winckelmann notes in a letter. On 28 January 1760, the funeral service took place in the church of San Giovanni dei Fiorentini, Naples, where numerous "Signori Virtuosi di Musica Napoletani" participated. The musical direction of the funeral service lay in the hands of the Court Kapellmeister Giuseppe de Majo.

Winckelmann, who was in Italy at the time, was truly saddened by the death of Belli. In his letter, he again refers to the particular beauty of Belli: one might think that he shared a predilection for the singer, as might be suggested by Rabener. In a letter to Baron von Stosch he wrote about Belli's death:

"The beautiful, indeed the most beautiful, Belli has died, as you will know ... I mourn as much about him as she does."

According to Fürstenau Belli was also the "favourite of the ladies in Dresden" (especially for his fine voice and beautiful face).

== Sources ==
- Moritz Fürstenau: Zur Geschichte der Musik und des Theaters am Hofe der Kurfürsten von Sachsen und Könige von Polen: Friedrich August I. (August II.) u. Friedrich August II. (August III.). Dresden 1862: Kuntze (MDZ: online version)
- Karl-Josef Kutsch, Leo Riemens: Großes Sängerlexikon. Volume 1: Aarden-Castles. 4th, extended and updated edition. Saur, Munich 2003, ISBN 3-598-11598-9, p. 329 (online via De Gruyter online)
