= Peter Ritter =

German composer, conductor, chorus master and cellist

Johann Peter Ritter (2 July 1763 - 1 August 1846) was a German composer, conductor, chorus master, and cellist born and died in Mannheim, Karlsruhe, Baden-Württemberg, Germany). He is best known in the United States for "Sun of My Soul" and "Holy God, We Praise Thy Name."

Peter Ritter was son of the oboist Georg Wilhelm Ritter and the nephew of the bassoonist Georg Wenzel Ritter. He was a student of Abbé Vogler, who also taught Giacomo Meyerbeer and Carl Maria von Weber. He played cello in the orchestra of the Mannheim National Theatre beginning in 1786 and became one of its concertmasters in 1801. From 1803 to 1823 he worked as its conductor. His successor was the Antonio Salieri student, Michael Frey.

In addition to more than 20 stage works, including Die lustige Weiber, one of the earliest known operas after William Shakespeare and one of ten operatic adaptations of The Merry Wives of Windsor. Ritter also composed church music and various instrumental works. His brother, Heinrich Ludwig Ritter, became known as a violinist, his, son Karl August Ritter, was a singer.

== Works ==
- Der Eremit auf Formentera (Libretto: August von Kotzebue), komische Oper, 1788
- Der Sklavenhändler (Libretto: Christian Friedrich Schwan), Singspiel, 1790
- Die Weihe (Libretto: Georg Christian Römer), musikalisches Schauspiel, 1792
- Die lustigen Weiber (Libretto: Georg Christian Römer after Shakespeare), Singspiel, 1794
- Dilara oder Die schwarze Zauberinsel (Libretto: Wolfgang Heribert von Dalberg after Carlo Gozzi), Singspiel, 1798
- Das Fest in Apollons Haine (Libretto: Georg Christian Römer), Festspiel zu Ehren des schwedischen Königspaares, 1803
- Das neue Jahr (Neujahr) in Famagusta (after Clemens Brentano, Die lustigen Musikanten), Singspiel, 1804
- Das Fest am Rheine (Libretto: Siegfried August Mahlmann), 1806
- Salomon's Urtheil (Libretto: Georg Christian Römer), Oper, 1808
- Das Fest im Olymp, musikalischer Prolog zum Namenstag der Großherzogin Stephanie von Baden, 1808
- Der Zitherschläger (Libretto: Heinrich Seidel), Singspiel, 1810
- Das Tal von Barzelonetta oder Die beiden Eremiten, Singspiel, 1811
- Feodore (Libretto: August von Kotzebue), Singspiel, 1811
- Alexander in Indien (Die Macedonier am Indus) (Libretto: Georg Christian Römer after Pietro Metastasio), Oper, 1811
- Die Jubelfeier (Libretto: Karl Ludwig Kaibel), musikalisches Drama, 1816
- Leonore oder Das Geistergericht (after Gottfried August Bürger), Ballade, 1815
- Der Schutzgeist (Libretto: August von Kotzebue), dramatische Legende, 1816
- Alfred (Libretto: August von Kotzebue), Oper, 1820
- Der Mandarin oder Die gefoppten Chinesen (Libretto von Heinrich Ritter), komisches Singspiel, 1821
- Hoang-Puff oder Das dreifache Horoskop (Libretto: Hermann Herzenskron), Singspiel, 1822
- Bianca (Libretto: Albert Ludwig Grimm), Oper, 1825
- Der Talisman, Singspiel, 1825
- Das Grubenlicht (Libretto: Louise Beck), romantische Oper, 1833
