= Giovanni Ambrogio Migliavacca =

Italian poet and librettist

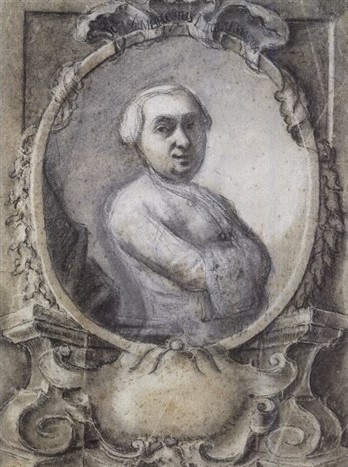
- Portrait of Migliavacca by Bartolomeo Nazari
- Born: c. 1718; Milan, Italy
- Died: c. 1795
- Occupations: Poet and librettist

Giovanni Ambrogio Migliavacca (Note: Migliavacca's first name is sometimes rendered as Giannambrogio or Gianambrogio.) (c. 1718 – c. 1795) was an Italian poet and librettist. A student and protégé of Metastasio, he was primarily active in the court theaters of Dresden and Vienna. His most successful work was the libretto for the opera Solimano, first set by Johann Adolph Hasse in 1753 and subsequently set by eighteen other composers in the following decades.

== Life and career ==
Migliavacca was born in Milan around 1718, but the exact date of his birth as well as his parentage and early life are unknown. Much of the information about his life has come from Metastasio's letters. At the age 18, in 1736, Migliavacca edited a collection of poetic tributes dedicated to the Duke of Noailles. Soon after, he became a member of the Accademia dei Filodossi and was active in the Milanese intellectual milieu of the Enlightenment. He initially opted for a career as a diplomat, working as the imperial secretary of the Italian legation to the court of Charles VII where he became a favourite of the emperor. After the death of Charles VII in 1745, Migliavacca saw little future in a diplomatic career and instead focused on his literary pursuits.

He moved to Vienna and between 1748 and 1752, and worked there as a secretary, copyist, and later a collaborator of Metastasio. At the time, Metastasio was the court poet to Holy Roman Empress Maria Theresa. One of his duties was to supervise opera rehearsals and give directions to the singers. When Jommelli's Merope was to be performed in 1749, Metastasio delegated his directorial duties to Migliavacca. Tensions arising from a feud between two of the opera's star singers, Migliavacca's close friend Vittoria Tesi, and the castrato Caffarelli, and from Caffarelli's refusal to attend rehearsals reached a climax when he and Migliavacca fought a duel at Vittoria Tesi's house. However, her entreaties to the combatants ended the incipient sword fight before anyone was hurt.

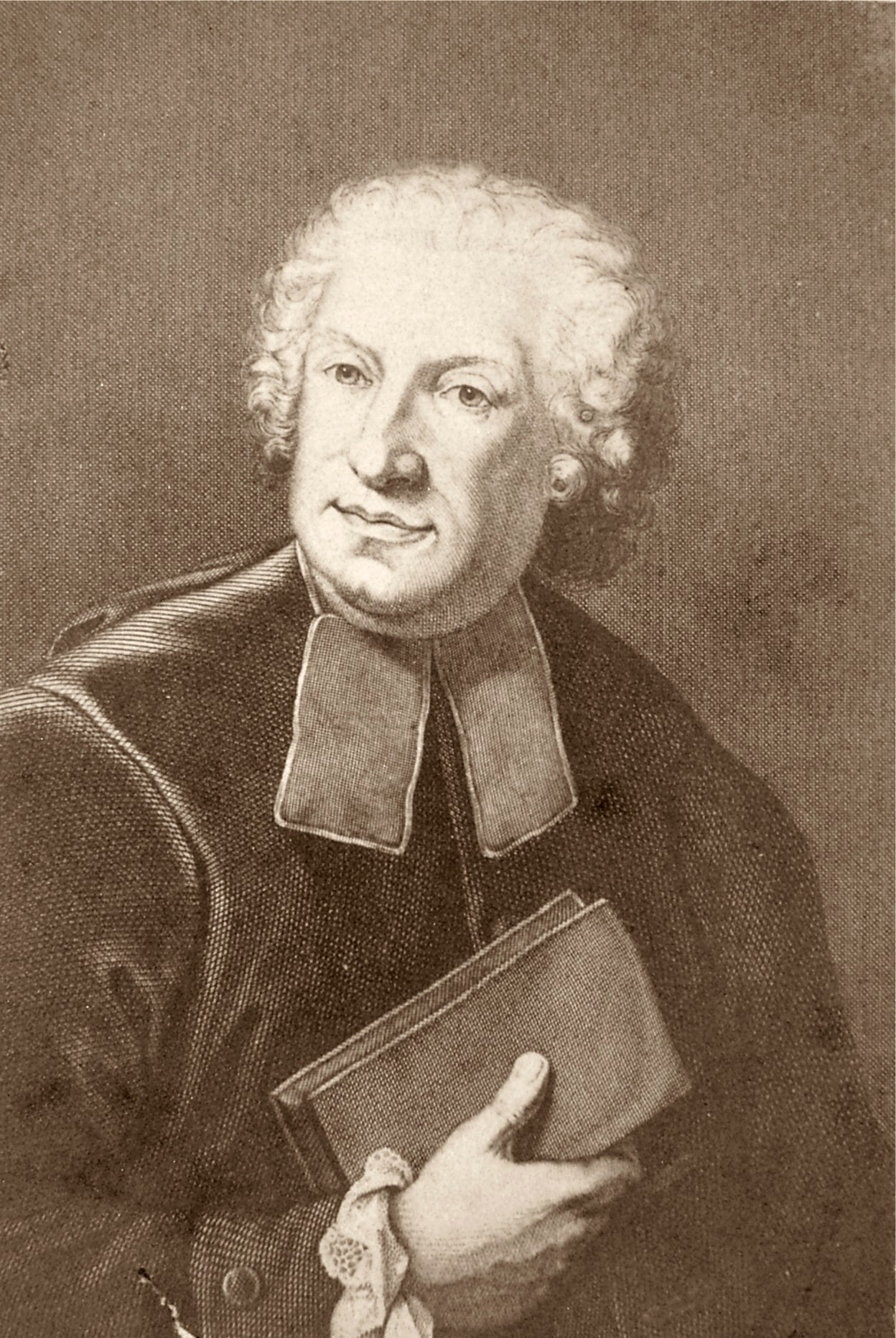
Pietro Metastasio, Migliavacca's mentor

Migliavacca made his debut as a librettist in his own right (albeit closely supervised by Metastasio) in 1750 with Armida placata, composed by Giovanni Battista Mele and performed in Madrid to celebrate the marriage of Maria Antonia Ferdinanda of Spain and Victor Amadeus III of Sardinia. It was performed again in Vienna later that year in a pastiche version with music by several composers including Luca Antonio Predieri and Johann Adolph Hasse. Through Metastasio, Migliavacca had also become acquainted with Duchess Maria Antonia of Bavaria. She was the wife of Frederick Christian, heir to the thrones of Saxony and Poland, and was a patron of the arts as well as gifted composer, singer, and harpsichordist. Two of her operas, Il trionfo della fedeltà and Talestri, have survived, but according to Bruno Brunelli, (Note: Bruno Brunelli Bonetti (1885–1958) was an Italian literary scholar and historian. Amongst his works were the curation of the five-volume collection of Metastasio's complete works published in 1951 and a biography of Giustiniana Wynne.) she had earlier composed a short opera (now lost) to a libretto by Migliavacca entitled Giove fulminatore dei giganti.

In 1752, through the intervention of Metastasio, Migliavacca was appointed court poet and diplomatic counselor to Frederick Christian's father Frederick Augustus II. The following year, he produced what was to prove his most enduring work, the libretto for Hasse's opera Solimano. It premiered at the court theatre in Dresden in a spectacular production that included live elephants and camels and hundreds of extras in addition to the seven main singers. His libretto was subsequently set by 18 other composers and saw 36 separate productions over the next 50 years. In 1754 he produced the libretto for Hasse's next opera Artemisia and in 1755 adapted Metastasio's libretto for Hasse's Ezio. Like Solimano, Ezio was a lavish operatic spectacle which included a procession of 400 soldiers and over 100 horses from the royal stable. When the 1756 Prussian invasion of Dresden severely curtailed the musical life of the court, Migliavacca worked in Vienna and then returned to Milan in 1765. During his sojourn in Milan he was instrumental in negotiating the Biblioteca Ambrosiana's acquisition of two valuable book collections belonging to the Clerici and Lambertenghi families.

In 1780 Migliavacca was re-engaged as the poet of the court theatre in Dresden and was paid there regularly through 1795. The cessation of payments after that time without their conversion to a pension suggests that he died shortly after the end of that year. There are no records of the exact date or place of his death. His last known libretto from that period was La reggia d'Imeneo, a festa teatrale performed in Dresden in 1787 to celebrate the marriage of Anton of Saxony. The libretto printed for that performance still listed him as a diplomatic counselor to the Saxony court. (Note: Original Italian: "La poesia è del Sig. Giannambrogio Migliavacca, poeta, e Consigliere di Legazione di sua Altezza Serenissima Elettorale")

Migliavacca's libretti were long ignored by later literary critics who dismissed them as the work of a semi-dilettante and mediocre imitator of Metastasio. However, in the late 20th century, he came to be appreciated as one of a group of reforming Italian librettists which also included Ranieri de' Calzabigi, Mattia Verazi, Giovanni de Gamerra, and Gaetano Martinelli. They moved away from the traditional Metasasian plot structures, increased the number of ensembles relative to solo arias, and organized the ballets, arias, and ensembles into integrated dramatic scenes rather than the series of showy arias which had previously characterised opera seria.

== Libretti ==
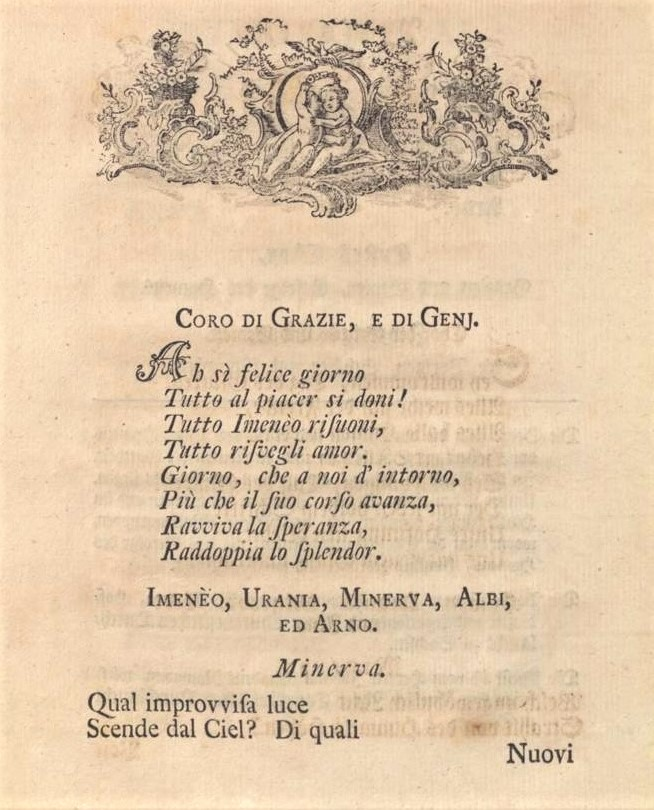
First page of La reggia d'Imeneo, Migliavacca's last known libretto

- Armida placata (opera seria in two acts) first set by Giovanni Battista Mele, premiered Buen Retiro Palace, Madrid, 12 April 1750
- Giove fulminatore dei giganti (opera/cantata) set by Maria Antonia of Bavaria, 1752 (lost)
- Solimano (opera seria in three acts) first set by Johann Adolph Hasse, premiered Opernhaus am Zwinger, Dresden, 5 February 1753 (Note: Solimano was subsequently set by numerous other composers, including Fischietti (1755), Pescetti (1756), Perez (1757), and Galuppi (1760).)
- Artemisia (opera in three acts) first set by Johann Adolph Hasse, premiered Opernhaus am Zwinger, Dresden, 6 February 1754 (Note: Artemisia was subsequently set by Giuseppe Calegari and performed at the Teatro San Benedetto, Venice in 1782.)
- Tetide (serenata in two parts) first set by Christoph Willibald Gluck, premiered Hofburg Palace, Vienna for the wedding of Princess Isabella of Parma and Joseph, Archduke of Austria, 10 October 1760
- Armida (1st version, azione teatrale in one act) co-written with Giacomo Durazzo and based on Quinault's Armide, first set by Tommaso Traetta, premiered Burgtheater. Vienna, 3 January 1761
- Prometeo assoluto (serenata), first set by Georg Christoph Wagenseil, premiered Burgtheater, Vienna to celebrate the birth of Archduchess Maria Theresa of Austria, 24 March 1762
- Arianna (festa teatrale in one act), set to pre-existing arias by Christoph Willibald Gluck, premiered Favorita Palace, Laxenburg, 27 May 1762
- Acide e Galatea (festa teatrale in one act) and Vivan gl'illustri sposi (cantata), both set by Joseph Haydn, premiered Schloss Esterházy, Eisenstadt for the wedding of Prince Anton Esterházy, 11 January 1763
- Armida (2nd version, opera in three acts) co-written with Giacomo Dubrazzo and based on Quinault's Armide, first set by Tommaso Traetta, premiered Teatro San Carlo, Naples, 30 May 1763 (Note: This three-act version of Armida was subsequently set by several other composers, including Josef Mysliveček whose Armida was performed at La Scala in 1779.)
- Il ritorno del figliuol prodigo (azione sacra), set by Johann Gottlieb Naumann, premiered Royal Chapel, Dresden, 10 April 1784
- Mosè riconosciuto figura di Gesù Cristo salvator nostro (oratorio), set by Joseph Schuster, premiered Royal Chapel, Dresden, 15 April 1786
- La reggia d'Imeneo (festa teatrale in one act), set by Johann Gottlieb Naumann, premiered Opernhaus am Zwinger, Dresden for the wedding of Anton of Saxony, 21 October 1787
