= Alexander Soddy =

British composer and pianist (born 1982)

Alexander Soddy (born 20 December 1982) is a British conductor and pianist.

Since the 2016–17 season, Soddy has been general music director at the Nationaltheater Mannheim and in this capacity also artistic director of the Musikalische Akademie des Nationaltheater-Orchesters Mannheim. From 2013 to 2016, he was chief conductor at the Stadttheater Klagenfurt. From 2010 to 2012, he was engaged as Kapellmeister at the Hamburg State Opera.

== Artistic career ==
Soddy was born in Oxford and trained as a chorister at Magdalen College in his home town before beginning his conducting and vocal studies at the Royal Academy of Music in London. At the same time he was a piano student of the pianist and chamber music expert Michael Dussek. Subsequently, Soddy studied musicology and music analysis at Cambridge on a choral scholarship from Selwyn College. After graduating in 2004, he was engaged as a répétiteur and conductor at the National Opera Studio in London, where he was supported by the Friends of Covent Garden and the Scottish Opera.

In October 2005, Soddy became répétiteur at the Hamburg State Opera and, after only a short time, first musical assistant to general music director Simone Young. From 2010 to 2012, he was engaged as Kapellmeister at the Hamburg State Opera. In the 2008–09 season, he made his debut there with Mozart's The Magic Flute and subsequently conducted among others La bohème, Rigoletto, Don Giovanni, La traviata, Lucia di Lammermoor as well as Gounod's Faust and Bizet's Carmen. Engagements followed at the Bavarian State Opera in Munich (Die Zauberflöte, La bohème), the Berlin State Opera (Die Zauberflöte, Der Freischütz) and the Royal Swedish Opera (La bohème, Madama Butterfly). From 2013 to 2016, he was chief conductor at the Stadttheater Klagenfurt, where he led among others the new productions of Der Rosenkavalier and Macbeth. In the new production of Der Ring des Nibelungen at the Bayreuth Festival from 2013 to 2015, he took over the musical study direction alongside Kirill Petrenko. In the 2014–15 season, Soddy made his debut at the Oper Frankfurt and the Cologne Opera. In the 2017–18 season followed his debut at houses such as New York's Metropolitan Opera with Puccini's La bohème, at the Semperoper Dresden with Weber's Der Freischütz, at the Vienna State Opera with Il barbiere di Siviglia as well as at the English National Opera with Britten's A Midsummer Night's Dream.

Since the beginning of the 2016–17 season, Soddy has been General Music Director at the Mannheim National Theatre and has conducted the premieres of Giuseppe Verdi's Aida, Schumann's Genoveva, Beethoven's Fidelio and Mozart's Don Giovanni as well as numerous revivals, including Hansel and Gretel, Madama Butterfly, Elektra, Der Rosenkavalier, Tannhäuser, Lohengrin and Parsifal. Under his direction, a large-scale Bruckner cycle was performed from 2017 to 2023. He also champions works rarely heard in Germany such as Benjamin Britten's War Requiem and the premiere of symphonic commissions. In the 2018–19 season, Soddy conducted the new productions of Die Meistersinger von Nürnberg (directed by Nigel Lowery) and Pelléas et Mélisande (directed by Barrie Kosky) at the Nationaltheater Mannheim. In addition to the Academy Concerts in Mannheim, concert engagements have taken him to Germany and the US.

== Private life ==
Soddy lives in Mannheim with his wife, soprano Trine Wilsberg Lund, and two daughters. His parents and two siblings live in Oxfordshire and London, England. Soddy is related to Frederick Soddy, winner of the Nobel Prize in Chemistry in 1921.

== Press commentaries ==
- "The musical side of [the Mozart premiere of Don Giovanni] succeeded to the fullest extent this evening, and was downright thrilling. The Mannheim Opera Orchestra was well rehearsed, immensely inspired and beautiful in sound. GMD Alexander Soddy brought out the drama of the music effectively. He excitingly shaped the climaxes, emphasised the changing dynamics with striking sforzati and crescendi, and formed magnificent lines. Thus the music gained transparency and volume." (Bachtrack, 17 July 2018.)
- "What came to an end here was not music, or a symphony or anything like that, but the darkness and the doubt that gnaws at us. A kind of 'White Mass', then. And when it came to an end, in the Rosengarten in Mannheim ..., it was not applause that was heard. It was jubilation such as has not been experienced in an Academy concert, at least not in the past thirteen years. ... Soddy manages, with a completely light and ... direct approach, to free Bruckner from all earthiness ... and allow him to fly. ... Soddy arranges things on the spot and knows what belongs where. This leads to the unbelievably perfect sound picture." – Stefan Dettlinger (Mannheimer Morgen, 3 July 2018)
- "How Soddy holds the three levels of the work [War Requiem by Benjamin Britten] ... together and cleverly interweaves them: great! ... In general, this evening is one of the most impressive that the Academy has produced in recent years. Consternation and jubilation last for a long time." (Mannheimer Morgen, April 2018)
- "Britten's atmospheric score, with its contrasting textures for the three worlds, is beautifully played under the Germany-based English conductor Alexander Soddy, a notable ENO debut." – Martin Kettle (The Guardian, 2 March 2018)
- "The orchestra is in extremely good shape after general music director Alexander Soddy took over." – Stefan Dettlinger (Mannheimer Morgen, 11 January 2017)
- "Alexander Soddy, the young orchestra director, is – after four encounters in recent years, it may be said decidedly – one of the most eminent conducting talents in opera for years. In these actually undramatic 'Conversations' [Dialogues des Carmélites] ... he instinctively sets precisely sounded out dramatic accents, as it were from within. The delicate colourfulness and luminosity that he creates thanks to the fabulous homogeneity and playing culture of the Carinthian Symphony Orchestra is exemplary. His unerring sense of sound perfectly benefits the idiom of the work, gives it intelligent contour and, through its austere beauty, banishes the ever latent danger of being suspected of kitsch." – Karl Harb (Salzburger Nachrichten, 21 February 2015)
