= Richard Laugs =

German conductor and pianist

Richard Fritz Alfred Laugs (10 March 1907 in Hagen - 13 June 1978 in Mannheim) was a German conductor and pianist.

Laugs was the son of conductor Robert Laugs. He studied at the University of Music and Theatre Munich and the Berlin University of the Arts, under both Joseph Pembaur and Artur Schnabel amongst others. After his academic studies he undertook a concert tour as a pianist and worked as a Répétiteur in Hannover and Berlin.

From 1945 to 1947 Laugs was musical director at the National Theater, Mannheim, and then until 1950 the first Kapellmeister there. In 1951 he was appointed director of the Mannheim University of Music and Performing Arts, and in 1955 he became a professor there.

In 2000 his widow and the Mannheimer law professor Claus Meissner created the Beethoven Klavierwettbewerb Richard Laugs (Richard Laugs Beethoven piano competition) in Laugs' memory.

== Discography ==
- 1967 - Kammermusik Für Bassetthorn, with Heinrich Fink (basset horn), Rudolf Krauslich (cello), Jürgen Kussmaul (viola) and Rainer Kussmaul (violin). (Da Camera Magna SM 92507)
- 1976 - Variations on "To jsou konè", with Heinrich Fink. (Musical Heritage Society MHS 1182)
