= Teresa Albuzzi-Todeschini =

Italian opera singer

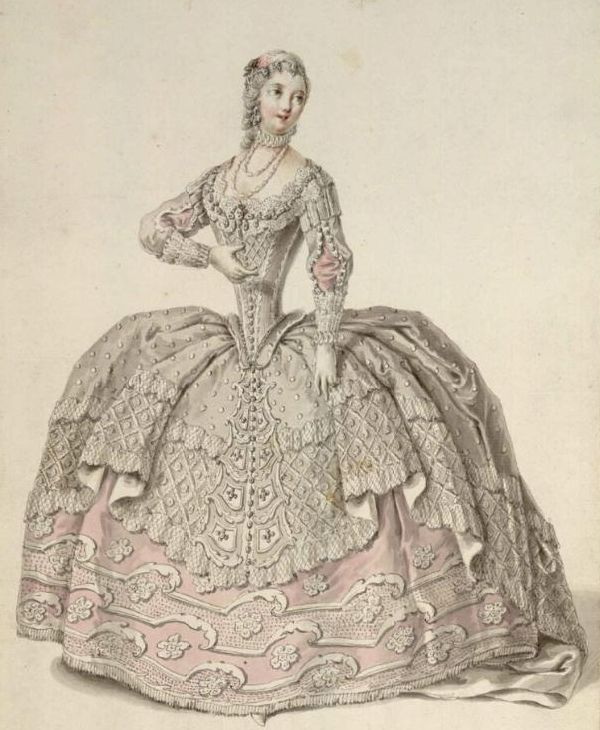
Albuzzi-Todeschini as Tusnelda in Hasse's Arminio (Dresden 1753)

Teresa Albuzzi-Todeschini (26 December 1723 – 30 June 1760) was an Italian opera singer (contralto) who performed in Germany.

== Life ==
Born in Milan, Albuzzi-Todeschini was hired at the Opernhaus am Zwinger in Dresden on 1 January 1750. Along with Regina Mingotti she was the successor of Faustina Bordoni and was considered a "prima donna at more than one place". Critics praised her for her "full, sonorous and extremely trained voice [and] her masterful and gorgeous performance". Albuzzi-Todeschini was earning 2000 thalers per year in 1750, and 3000 thalers per years three years later in 1753.

Prime Minister Heinrich von Brühl fell in love with Albuzzi-Todeschini and he had a gazebo built for her outside the Dresden town walls, called "Brühl's Rotunda" but nicknamed "Albuzzi's Bush". Albuzzi-Todeschini remained in Dresden during the Seven Years' War but joined her mother, her husband Antonio Schreivogel-Todeschini, and her two children in Milan in December 1758. She died after a long illness in 1760 at the inn "Zum Einhorn" and was buried on 25 May 1760 in Prague.
