= Michael Frey (composer) =

Michael Frey (1787 – 10 August 1832) was a German violinist, chorus master, and composer.

Frey studied composition with Antonio Salieri in Vienna. From 1823 to 1832 he was conductor of the orchestra of the Mannheim National Theatre. His successor was Joseph Eschborn. He composed a violin concerto and three operas, including the singspiel Jery und Bätely, based on a libretto by Johann Wolfgang von Goethe, which was received with applause by music critics.

== Sources ==
- Musikalische Akademie des National-Orchesters Mannheim - Geschichte
- Josef Schmidt-Görg: Wiener Opernaufführungen im Winter 1815/1816 Nach den Tagebuchaufzeichnungen eines jungen Geigers
