= Tetide =

Opera by Christoph Willibald Gluck

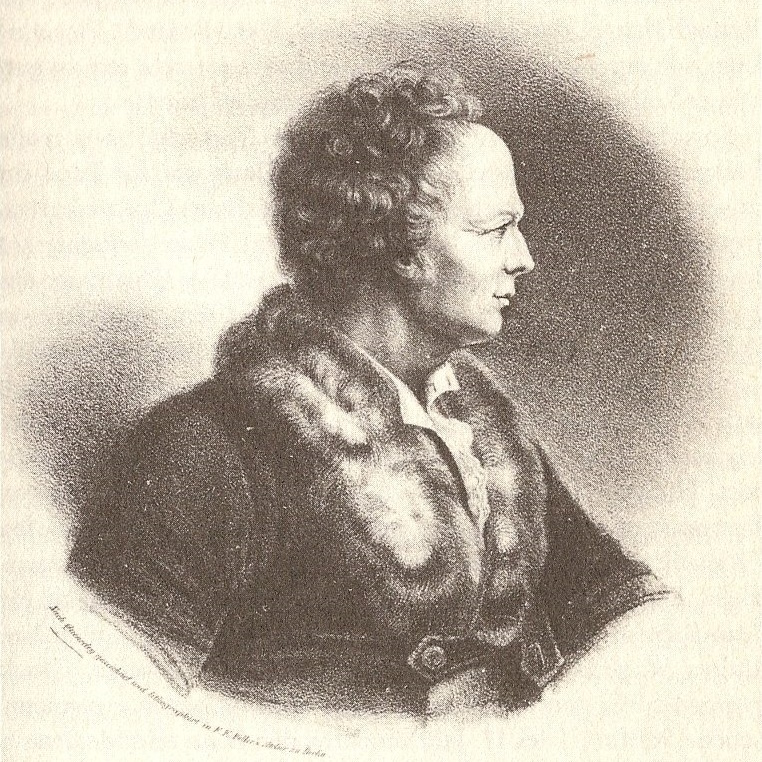
Portrait of Christoph Willibald Gluck, ca. 1750

Tetide (Thetis) is an opera by the composer Christoph Willibald Gluck. It takes the form of a serenata in two parts. The Italian-language libretto is by Giovanni Ambrogio Migliavacca. The opera premiered on 10 October 1760 at the Hofburg Palace, Vienna.

== Roles ==
Cast	Voice type	Premiere cast
Tetide (Thetis)	soprano	Caterina Gabrielli
Apollo	soprano castrato	Giovanni Manzoli
Marte (Mars)	tenor	Carlo Carlani
Imeneo (Hymen)	soprano castrato	Antonio Priori
Pallade (Pallas Athena)	soprano	Maria Picinelli
Venere (Venus)	soprano	Teresa Giacomazzi
Chorus: Sea gods and goddesses

== Sources ==
- Holden, Amanda The Viking Opera Guide (Viking, 1993), page 374.
- Gluck Gesamtausgabe Tetide
