= Mannheim National Theatre =

Theatre and opera company in Mannheim, Germany

Coordinates: 49°29′16″N 8°28′41″E

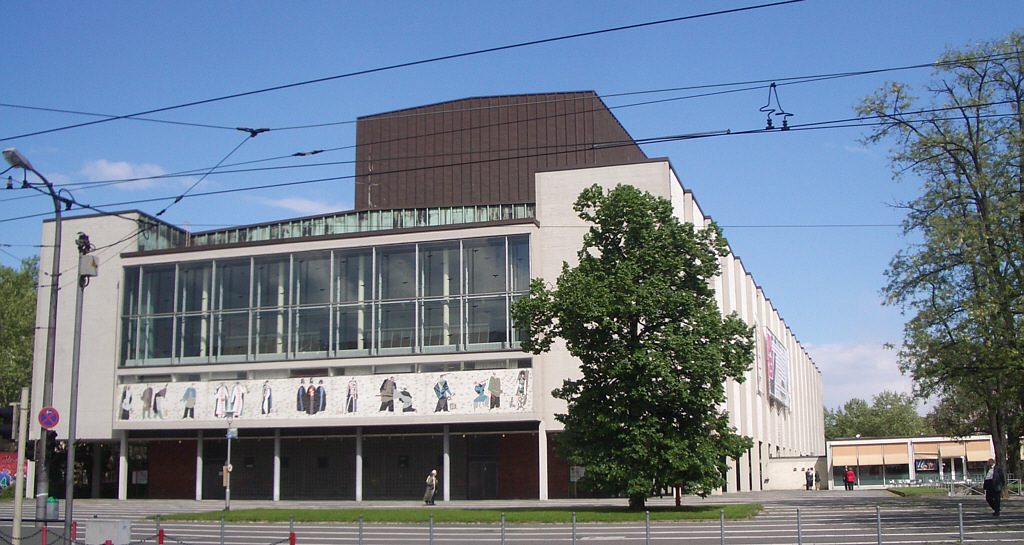
Nationaltheater Mannheim

The Mannheim National Theatre (German: Nationaltheater Mannheim) is a theatre and opera company in Mannheim, Germany, with a variety of performance spaces. It was founded in 1779 and is one of the oldest theatres in Germany.

== History ==
Abel Seyler, the theatre's first artistic director

In the 18th century Mannheim was the capital of the Electoral Palatinate and the residence city of the reigning prince-electors. When Charles Theodore also became the Duke of Bavaria in 1777, he moved to Munich and brought the theatre company of Theobald Marchand with him from Mannheim. In 1778 he instructed the courtier Wolfgang Heribert von Dalberg—the brother of Prince-Elector and Grand Duke Karl Theodor von Dalberg—to establish a new theatre in Mannheim. At first Dalberg contracted Abel Seyler's theatre company with performing in Mannheim on an occasional basis from 1778 to 1779. Performances included Shakespeare plays such as Hamlet and Macbeth. In the autumn of 1779 Seyler moved permanently to Mannheim with the remaining members of his theatre company. Several actors who had been affiliated with the Gotha Court Theatre under Konrad Ekhof's direction—essentially an offshoot of the Seyler Theatre Company—also joined him; Ekhof himself had died the previous year. The Mannheim National Theatre opened in October 1779 with Seyler as its first artistic director (Direktor) and Dalberg as its general administrator (Intendant). Seyler remained as director until 1781.

In the past three hundred years, an important part of the history of German theatre and music history was written both in the original theatre and in Mannheim where new artistic styles were developed and refined in theatre, music and dance. Thus it reflects the tradition of many of the major names of the German arts such as Friedrich Schiller and Wolfgang Amadeus Mozart.

In terms of the history of the company, Schiller's first major drama, The Robbers (Die Räuber) was given its inaugural performance in 1782 in presence of the playwright at the National Theatre. The response was overwhelming: "the theatre resembled a lunatic asylum, rolling eyes, clenched fists, ramming feet, hoarse proclamations in the auditorium! Strange humans fell onto each other locked together…."

=== History since 1900 ===
By the early 19th century, disagreements between the Grand-Duchy of Baden and the City of Mannheim over the financing of the theatre finally resulted in a ministerial order in April 1839 that the responsibility for running the theatre be handed over to the City of Mannheim, and thus it became the first locally-administered theatre in Germany.

Following the destruction of the theatre and parts of the city of Mannheim in September 1943, ten years were to pass before an architectural competition for a new theatre was proposed. The original design, while still considered a classic of modern theatre architecture, was not used. Instead, between 1955 and 1957 a new theatre building was constructed at Goethe Place (not in the same location as the original National Theatre) utilizing the designs of the architect Gerhard Weber. The new National Theatre building was inaugurated in 1957 with simultaneous productions of Carl Maria von Weber's Der Freischütz in the opera house and (fitting for its reflection of the theatre's early history) Schiller's The Robbers in the playhouse. In 1979, the youth and children's theatre ensemble (Schnawwl) was set up with its main theatre space being the converted from an old fire station in the Mannheim suburb Neckarstadt.

== Performance venues ==
The venues of the present-day theatre consist of:

- Opera house with 1,200 seats, used primarily for opera, operetta, and ballet
- Schauspielhaus (playhouse) with 800 seats, used for small presentation such as chamber music and theatre
- Schnawwl, the youth and children's theatre

Opera house and Schauspielhaus are two theatres under one roof. They share foyers and other facilities.

== Theatre and other festivals ==
The Schillertage, the biannual festival of Schiller's plays that has existed since 1979, selects a group of productions for the Mannheim festival presented both on the theatre's mainstage (plus an experimental series of plays elsewhere). In the past, the main stage series has featured multiple productions of Schiller's early play, The Robbers (in addition to a production of Verdi's opera based on that play, I masnadieri), as well as Intrigue and Love, and his later plays William Tell (1804) (the basis for Rossini's opera of the same name in 1829) and The Maid of Orleans (Die Jungfrau von Orléans), some of which became part of Tchaikovsky's opera.

=== Music at the National Theatre ===
Mannheim was home to the so-called Mannheim School of 18th-century classical composers. It was reputed to have one of the best court orchestras in Europe and, for more than 200 years, the Mannheim School had been recognized by musicians all over the world. Johann Stamitz and his pupil and successor Christian Cannabich were instrumental for the Mannheim Court Orchestra. In the 18th century this court ensemble attracted many musicians. Thus numerous famous soloists came to Mannheim to work as composers as well as pedagogues.

== People ==
=== Administrators and directors ===
- Wolfgang Heribert von Dalberg (as administrator from 1779)
- Abel Seyler (as director 1779–1781)

=== Conductors ===
The leading conductors were first named Hofkapellmeister. From 1923 the title was Generalmusikdirektor.

- Ignaz Fränzl (1779–1803)
- Johann Peter Ritter (1803–1823)
- Michael Frey (1823–1832)
- Joseph Eschborn (1832–1834)
- Franz Lachner (1834–1836)
- Vinzenz Lachner (1836–1872)
- Ernst Frank (1872–1877)
- Franz Fischer (1877–1880)
- Emil Paur (1880–1889)
- Felix Weingartner (1889–1891)
- Hugo Röhr (1892–1896)
- Emil von Reznicek (1896–1899)
- Willibald Kaehler (1899–1906)
- Hermann Kutzschbach (1906–1909)
- Artur Bodanzky (1909–1915)
- Wilhelm Furtwängler (1915–1920)
- Franz von Hoeßlin (1920–1922)
- Erich Kleiber (1922–1923)
- Richard Lert (1923–1928)
- Erich Orthmann (1928–1930)
- Joseph Rosenstock (1930–1933)
- Philipp Wüst (1933–1936)
- Karl Elmendorff (1936–1942)
- Eugen Bodart (1942–1944)
- Richard Laugs (1945–1947)
- Fritz Rieger (1947–1950)
- Eugen Szenkar (1950–1951)
- Herbert Albert (1951–1963)
- Horst Stein (1963–1970)
- Hans Wallat (1970–1980)
- Wolfgang Rennert (1980–1985)
- Peter Schneider (1985–1987)
- Friedemann Layer (1987–1990 und 2007–2009)
- Miguel Ángel Gómez Martínez (1990–1993)
- Jun Märkl (1993–2000)
- Ádám Fischer (2000–2005)
- Frédéric Chaslin (2005–2006)
- Axel Kober (2006–2007)
- Dan Ettinger (2009–2016)
- Alexander Soddy (2016–2023)
- Roberto Rizzi Brignoli (2023–present)

== Administration and musical performances in the 21st century ==
At the beginning of the 21st century, the National Theatre has revived the "Mannheim Tradition" with the inauguration of the International Orchestra Academy in Mannheim. Experts in the field of historic instruments and performance and musicians from the orchestra of the National Theatre will work with young musicians and music students. They will teach the special stylistic requirements of orchestral playing in the 18th century.

From September 2000, Ádám Fischer was general music director of National Theater Mannheim and he completed his term in July 2005 with a performance of Götterdämmerung. During his tenure, Fischer made the theatre one of the best interpreters of Mozart in Europe. He started two major projects in Mannheim, one the Mannheim Mozart Week, the other the Mannheim School, a summer seminar for young people from all over the world.

Highlighting works by Mozart, the National Theatre focused on his music and performed many of his works including unknown pieces composed for the Mannheim Orchestra. Overall, Fischer conducted two or three new productions each year including the Mannheim Ring cycle. The four productions were produced separately in 2000, then Fischer conducted 9 cycles over 5 years.

Fischer's successor, Frédéric Chaslin, took over in 2005 and was succeeded in 2007 by Axel Kober.
