= Zenobia (Hasse) =

Zenobia is a 1761 opera by Johann Adolph Hasse, one of several based on Metastasio's libretto. It premiered for carnival in Vienna, and then in October performed in Warsaw.

== Recording ==
- Zenobia. (excerpts). Władysław Kłosiewicz, Musicae Antiquae Collegium Varsoviense. PMC Pro Musica Camerata (Poland) 023. (1 CD 1997).
