= Domenico Fischietti =

Italian composer

Domenico Fischietti (1725–1810) was an Italian composer.

He was born in Naples and studied at the Conservatory of Sant'Onofrio Porta Capuana under the leadership of Leonardo Leo and Francesco Durante.

His first opera, Armindo, premiered in 1742 at the Teatro dei Fiorentini in Naples, though there are doubts about whether he could have started composing at such a young age - it may have been by his father. In 1755 he was in Venice to present Lo speziale (the apothecary), the first opera with a libretto by Carlo Goldoni. He followed this success with La ritornata a Londra (The Return to London) in 1756, Il mercato di Malmantile (The Market of Malmantile) in 1758, Il signor dottore (The Doctor) also in 1758, and La fiera di Sinigaglia in 1760. These works, all drammi giocosi, represent Fiscietti's chief claim to fame.

In 1764, he moved to Prague where he was associated with the impresario Giuseppe Bustelli at the Divadlo v Kotcích (German "Kotzentheater"). Besides a number of operas, it is known that Fischietti's oratorio La morte d'Abel was staged in this theater in 1763. In 1766 he became the master of the chapel court and the director of sacred music in Dresden. Here he worked with Johann Gottlieb Naumann. In 1772, he left Dresden and first travelled to Vienna and then to Salzburg where he became a master of the chapel of the prince-archbishop, Count Hieronymus von Colloredo despite Leopold Mozart’s protests. In 1775 he composed a Serenade to celebrate the visit there of Archduke Maximilian Francis of Austria; it was for the same occasion that Wolfgang Amadeus Mozart composed his opera Il re pastore. He got to know the Mozart family quite well, particularly Maria Anna Mozart who may have given her counterpoint lessons. Fischietti died in Salzburg in or after 1810.

== Operas ==
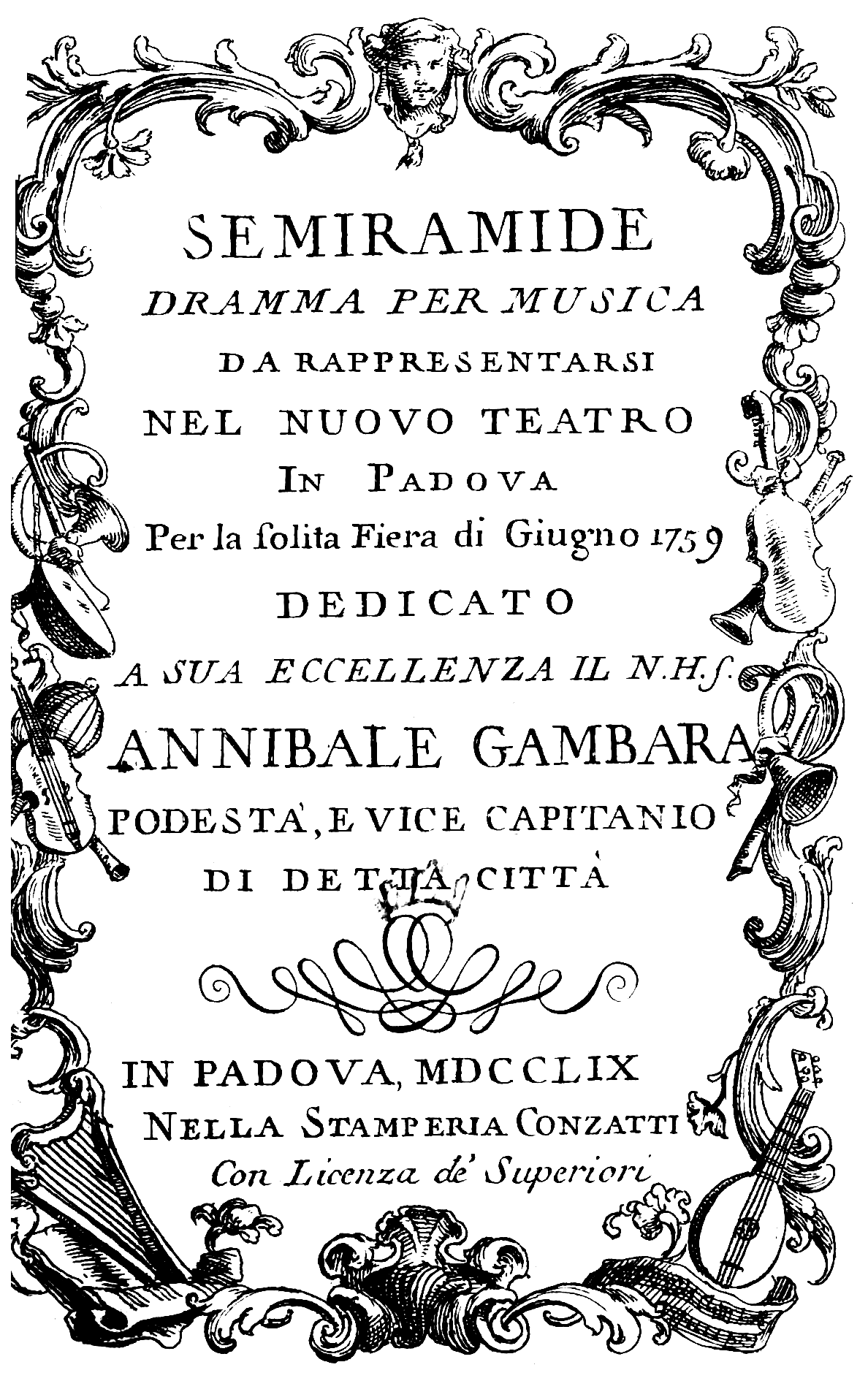
Domenico Fischietti - Semiramide - titlepage of the libretto - Padua 1759.

- Armindo (libretto by Paolo Saracino, 1742, Naples)
- L'abate Collarone (libretto by Pietro Trinchera, 1749, Naples)
- Il pazzo per amore (1752, Naples)
- La finta sposa (1753, Palermo)
- La Sulamitide (1753, Florence)
- Artaserse (libretto by Pietro Metastasio, 1754, Piacenza)
- Lo speziale (libretto by Carlo Goldoni, 1755, Venice)
- Solimano (libretto by Giovanni Ambrogio Migliavacca, 1755, Venice)
- La ritornata di Londra (libretto by Carlo Goldoni, 1756, Venice)
- Il mercato di Malmantile (libretto by Carlo Goldoni, 1758, Venice)
- Il signor dottore (libretto by Carlo Goldoni, 1758, Venice)
- Semiramide (libretto by Pietro Metastasio, 1759, Naples)
- La fiera di Sinigaglia (libretto by Carlo Goldoni, 1760, Rome)
- Tetide (1760, Vienna)
- Siface (libretto by Pietro Metastasio, 1761, Venice)
- Olimpiade (libretto by Pietro Metastasio, 1763, Prague)
- La donna di governo (libretto by Carlo Goldoni, 1763, Prague)
- Alessandro nell'Indie (libretto by Pietro Metastasio, 1764, Prague)
- Vologeso, re de Parti (libretto by Apostolo Zeno, 1764, Prague)
- Il dottore (revision of Il signor dottore, 1764, Crema)
- Nitteti (libretto by Pietro Metastasio, 1765, Prague)
- Les metamorphoses de l'amour, ou Le tuteur dupé (1769)
- Il bottanico novellista (revision of Lo speziale, 1770, Treviso)
- Talestri, regina dell'amazzoni (libretto by Maria Antonia Walpurgis of Bavaria, 1773, Salzburg)
- L'isola disabitata (libretto by Pietro Metastasio, 1774, Salzburg)
- Gli orti esperidi (libretto by Pietro Metastasio, 1775, Salzburg)
- Il creso (1776, Teatro di San Carlo, Naples)
- Arianna e Teseo (libretto by Pietro Pariati, 1777, Naples)
- La molinara (libretto by Filippo Livigni, 1778, Venice)
