= Enea in Caonia =

Enea in Caonia (Aeneas in Chaonia) is a 1727 serenata by J. A. Hasse to a libretto by Luigi Maria Stampiglia for Naples. Stampiglia's libretto was a revision of his father Silvio Stampiglia's libretto for an earlier opera of the same title set by Giovanni Bononcini for the emperor's name day which had been performed in Vienna in 1711.

== Recording ==
Carmela Remigio, Francesca Ascioti, Celso Albelo, Paola Valentina Molinari, Enea Barock Orchestra, Stefano Montanari CPO 2019
