= Luigi Gatti (composer) =

Composer

Luigi Gatti (7 October 1740 – 1 March 1817) was a classical composer. He was born in Lazise in 1740, the son of an organist, Francesco della Gatta. He was ordained a priest in Mantua. In the 1780s, he became Hofkapellmeister in Salzburg, and Leopold Mozart showed his irritation at not receiving it himself. Between 1801 and 1804, Gatti helped Mozart's sister, Nannerl, to locate unknown pieces by Mozart. He died in Salzburg in 1817.

He is famous for writing oratorios, cantatas, sextets and septets.

== Famous works ==
- Septet concertante in F for oboe, 2 horns, violin, viola, cello and double bass
- Sextet in E flat for English horn, bassoon, violin, viola, cello and double bass
- Concerto per pianoforte e orchestra in do Maggiore L7e5
