= Giovanni Battista Locatelli (opera director) =

Italian opera director and impresario (1713–1785)

Giovanni Battista Locatelli (7 January 1713 – 14 March 1785) was an Italian opera director, impresario and owner of a private opera company.

Locatelli was the court poet at Bonn in 1741. From 1748 to 1756, he presented opera productions in Prague, including works by Gluck to libretti by Metastasio. He presented other operas in Dresden as well in the 1750s. He went bankrupt in 1757 and left for Russia to relaunch his career as an impresario.

In 1757, he and his troupe were invited to St. Petersburg. They put on an opera every week for the court, and two to three times a week, they were allowed to give open public performances. The repertoire was mostly of Italian opera buffa, including one titled Sanctuary of the Gods. The Empress and Grand Duke Peter each attended at least one performance. He moved his troupe to Moscow in 1759 where he operated a theater with financial support from the state until he declared bankruptcy in 1762, after the theater was unable to present performances following the death of Empress Elizabeth. Empress Catherine II paid him 3,000 rubles for his years of service in presenting the highest standard of opera performance Russia had ever seen. He ended his career running a cabaret on the outskirts of St. Petersburg that "enjoyed the patronage of an exclusive clientele".

During its years in Russia, the troupe presented seven operas by Baldassare Galuppi (1706–1785):

- Il mondo della luna (Russian: Лунный мир – The World of the Moon, previously premiered in 1750, Venice)
- Il filosofo di campagna (Деревенский философ – The Village Philosopher, 1754, Venice)
- L'Arcadia in Brenta (Аркадия в Бренте – Arcadia in Brenta, 1749, Venice)
- I bagni d'Abano (Купанье в Абано – The Spa of Abano, written together with Bertoni, 1753, Venice)
- Il conte Caramella (Граф Карамелла – Count Caramella, 1749, Verona?)
- La calamità de' cuori (Сердечное бедствие – A Calamity of Hearts, 1752, Venice)
- Il mondo alla roversa, ossia Le donne che commandono (Мир наизнанку, или Женщины командуют – The World Upside Down, or Women in Command, 1750, Venice)
