= Joseph Eschborn =

German composer, violinist and conductor

Peter Joseph Eschborn (March 4, 1800, in Mainz – November 17, 1881, in Coburg) was a German composer, violinist and conductor.

== Life ==
Eschborn studied composition with Friedrich Witt. From 1821 to 1827 he was music director at the theater in Düsseldorf and from 1832 to 1834 conductor of the orchestra of the Mannheim National Theatre. His successor was Franz Lachner. He then worked as music director in Cologne, Stuttgart, Amsterdam and in 1845/1846 was director at Theater Aachen, living his last years in Coburg.

A setting of Friedrich Schiller's poem, "Das Lied von der Glocke," "as a declamatorium and set up for the stage by C. Simons" is in a printed piano version preserved from the year 1827. An opera, Der Bastard oder Das Stiergefecht "made in music by Joseph Eschborn" from the year 1836 is also preserved.

Eschborn was married to the singer Maria Angelika Ciscewski. Their daughter, Natalie, also became known as a singer under the stage name, Natalie Frassini.
