= Davide Perez =

Italian composer (1711–1778)

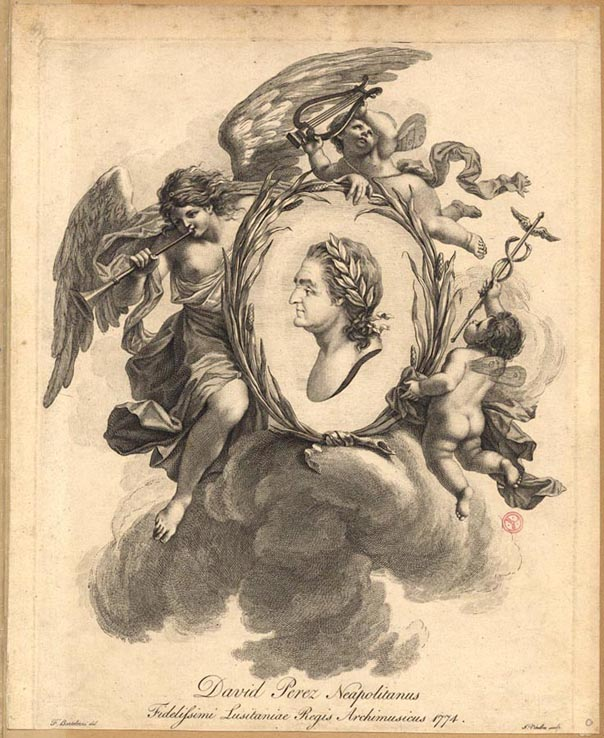
Davide Perez. Copper engraving by J. Vitalba after a drawing by Francesco Bartolozzi, 1774–1780?

Davide Perez (1711 – 30 October 1778) was an Italian opera composer born in Naples of Italian parents, and later resident court composer at Lisbon from 1752. He staged three operas on librettos of Metastasio at Lisbon with huge success in 1753, 1754, and 1755. Following the 1755 Lisbon earthquake, Perez turned from opera mostly to church music.

== Early years ==
Perez was born in Naples, the son of Giovanni Perez and Rosalina Serrari, both Neapolitans. At the age of 11 he became a student at the Conservatorio di S Maria di Loreto in Naples, where he remained until 1733, studying counterpoint with Francesco Mancini, singing and keyboard playing with Giovanni Veneziano, and violin with Francesco Barbella.

On completion of his studies, Perez immediately entered the service of the Sicilian Prince d’Aragona, Naselli. From 1734 date his first known pieces, the Latin cantatas Ilium Palladio astu Subducto Expugnatum and Palladium performed in Palermo's Collegio della Società di Gesù, for the laurelling festivities. In the following years, he was active both in Palermo and Naples, as his patron became Chamberlain of the newly crowned king, Carlo I. His first opera, La nemica amante, was composed for the king's birthday on 4 November 1735 and presented in the gardens of the Neapolitan royal palace and later in the Teatro S Bartolomeo. In the libretto's dedication the impresario of the theatre, Angelo Carasale, referred to Perez and Pergolesi as 'dei buoni virtuosi di questa città'. Unlike Pergolesi's opera, which was then considered a failure, Perez's was a great success, and his early career granted him, in 1738, an appointment as vicemaestro di cappella at Palermo's Cappella Palatina, the Church of St. Peter in the royal palace, to become maestro the next year upon the death of its former titular, Pietro Puzzuolo.

== Maturity ==
In the early 1740s Perez firmly established himself as a mature master. The opera he composed for the Roman Teatro d’Alibert, in the Carnival of 1740, was not presented due to the sudden death of Pope Clement XII, but on Perez's return to Naples he staged an opera buffa, I travestimenti amorosi and a serenata L’amor pittore for the court, and an opera seria, Il Siroe, for the Teatro San Carlo. Caffarelli and Manzuoli sang in the later.

Opera was not an easy enterprise in Palermo and, until 1745, most of Perez's compositions as chapel master there were cantatas or serenatas and church music - including in 1742 a setting of Metastasio's oratorio La Passione di Gesù Cristo. In addition he composed church music for Naples, and two operas for the Genovese Carnival season of 1744. After March 1748 Perez was granted a leave of absence and never returned to Palermo, though he continued to receive half of his Palermo salary until his death. In rapid succession, he then staged his operas in Naples, Rome, Florence, Venice, Milan, Turin, and Vienna. In February 1749 Perez competed with Niccolò Jommelli in a public examination for the position as chapel master in the Vatican. The influence of Cardinal Albani and Cardinal Passionei granted Jommelli the appointment, even though Perez was the musicians' favourite (Girolamo Chiti, the chapel master of another Papal chapel, St. John in Lateran, commented that Perez 'composes, sings and plays as an angel' and 'is very much superior to Jommelli in groundwork, singing and playing. He is, however, an imaginary hypochondriac').

== Career in Portugal ==
In 1752 King José I of Portugal invited Perez to become mestre de capela and music master to the royal princesses, a position he occupied until his death. The annual stipend of 2:000$000 (two contos de réis), coupled with the excellent musical and theatrical resources of the Portuguese court, undoubtedly influenced his decision to remain in Lisbon. The ambition of the recently crowned Portuguese king was to depart from his father's musical policy, almost uniquely concerned with church music, and to give Italian opera a central position in the court. Sumptuous scenic treatment was the rule, and Perez's operas were mounted by such famous designers as Berardi, Dorneau, Bouteux and Galli-Bibiena. Equally important were the great singers who appeared at the Portuguese court, including Raaf, Elisi, Manzuoli, Gizziello and Caffarelli.

The terrible earthquake that destroyed Lisbon on 1 November 1755, changed forever Perez's output. The Ópera do Tejo was destroyed six months after opening and the court withdrew from the theatres. No operas were produced for the next seven years, and thereafter only in a less spectacular fashion. During the last 23 years of his life, Perez wrote just three new operas. Instead he composed a huge amount of church music, covering almost all the rituals and practices of the two main musical chapels of Lisbon, the Royal and the Seminário da Patriarcal. He never left Portugal, so that his international acclaim slowly declined. Still, Gerber noted that since 1766 Perez's compositions were known and in demand in Germany and that he was in 1790 'one of the most celebrated and beloved composers among the Italian masters ... one of the latest composers who maintained the rigour of counterpoint'. J. C. Krause named Hasse, Perez and Paisiello as satisfactory models. In 1774 Perez became by acclamation a member of the London Academy of Ancient Music, and had the only full-scale piece printed in his lifetime, the Mattutino de' Morti (his third set of the Office of the Dead), published there by Bremner. His music, especially the religious, was widely copied in Italy. During the last four years of his life Perez suffered from a chronic disease, eventually losing his sight, but continued to compose. In 1778 his pupil, now Queen Maria I of Portugal, made him a Knight of the Order of Christ; when he died in Lisbon, she ordered an elaborate funeral at the Crown's expense.

== Operas ==
Perez composed more than 44 dramatic works between 1735 and 1777, 22 operas between 1744 and 1755, the period when he almost exclusively concentrated on the genre. Excerpts from Arminio, La Didone abbandonata, Ezio, Farnace, Solimano and Vologeso were published in London by John Walsh, and at least 24 exist in manuscript.

In the opere serie written before 1752 Perez was often bound by the forms of Metastasian opera. Il Siroe, Andromaca and Alessandro nell’Indie (1744 version) are prime examples: 20 or more full da capo arias (more than half accompanied by strings alone) are consistently used, with between one and four accompanied recitatives, usually a single duet, a perfunctory three-movement sinfonia and a simple choral finale for the principals. The arias are usually written in the Baroque concerto idiom, with extravagant word painting in the orchestra and extensive vocal bravura passages. Adhering to Metastasio's prescription of character definition as the sum of a pattern of dramatic reversals, each aria usually depicts a single affect, with few exceptions: Artaserse and Alessandro each contain a scene complex of related arias and accompanied recitatives.

With Demofoonte in 1752, as Perez began his lengthy residence in Lisbon, the monumental idiom declined and a sentimental style gained increasing prominence, with a resultant clarity of texture, greater symmetry of phrase, frequent rhythmic motives and emphasis on the pathetic. Formal modifications include the frequent absence of ritornellos, truncated da capo arias, between five and nine accompanied recitatives and several small ensembles. Perez's operas of the 1750s frequently display an orchestral mastery superior to that of the contemporary Italian opera school, incorporating features that during the 1740s he could only use in his church music. The strings are in three to five parts, the wind are often used for solo passages, and there is less doubling of the vocal parts and an increase in concertante passages. Among the better examples of this later manner are Olimpiade, Demofoonte, Ipermestra and Alessandro nell’Indie (1755 version).

Demetrio (1766 version) represents a transitional aesthetic, in which Perez combined a modified Baroque dramaturgy with a more up-to-date musical style: he eliminated 14 Metastasio aria texts, used eight accompanied recitatives and two duets for moments of personal reflection, and gave the da capo aria more musical and dramatic coherence. Solimano (1768) is his acknowledged masterpiece. It contains 14 dal segno arias, one cavatina and six accompanied recitatives, the scope and procedures of which are exceptional; several times the individual numbers are integrated into large-scale scene complexes. Kretzschmar (1919) claimed that Solimano 'belongs under the heading of masterworks ... richness of invention and of feeling, originality of means and of form, everything is therein, which makes an art great' and 'if all opera composers of the Neapolitan school had been of his stamp, there would have been no need of a Gluck’.

=== Operas list ===
- La nemica amante (librettist unknown), dramma per musica (4 Nov. 1735, Naples, Palazzo reale)
- I travestimenti amorosi (Antonio Palomba), commedia per musica (10 July 1740, Naples, Palazzo reale)
- Siroe (Pietro Metastasio) (4 Nov. 1740 Naples, Teatro S. Carlo)
- Demetrio (Pietro Metastasio), (13 June 1741, Palermo, Teatro S. Cecilia)
- Alessandro nell'Indie (Pietro Metastasio), (Carnaval 1744, Génova, Teatro Falcone)
- Merope (Apostolo Zeno) (1744 Gènova, Teatro Falcone)
- Leucippo (Giovanni Claudio Pasquini), favola pastorale (1744, Palermo, Teatro S. Cecilia)
- L'errore amoroso (Antonio Palomba), comedia per musica (Carnaval 1745, Palermo, Teatro S. Lucia)
- L'amor fra congionti, commedia (Carnaval 1746, Palermo, Teatro S. Lucia)
- Artaserse (Pietro Metastasio) (Autumn 1747, Florence, Teatro della Pergola)
- Semiramide riconosciuta' (Pietro Metastasio) (3 Feb. 1749, Roma, Teatro Alberto)
- La clemenza di Tito' (Pietro Metastasio) (1749, Naples, Teatro San Carlo)
- Andromeda (1750, Vienna, Hoftheater)
- Vologeso (Apostolo Zeno) (1750, Vienna, Hoftheater)
- Ezio (Pietro Metastasio) (26 Dec. 1750, Milan, Teatro regio ducale)
- Il Farnace (Apostolo Zeno, revised Antonio Maria Lucchini?) (Carnaval 1751 Turin, Teatro real)
- La Didone abbandonata (Pietro Metastasio) (1751, Genova)
- La Zenobia (Pietro Metastasio) (Autumn 1751, Milan, Teatro regio ducal)
- Il Demofoonte (Pietro Metastasio) (Autumn 1752 Lisboa, Teatro di Corte)
- L'Olimpiade (Pietro Metastasio) (Spring 1753, Lisboa, Teatro di Corte)
- L'eroe cinese (Pietro Metastasio) (6 June 1753, Lisboa, Teatro di Corte)
- Adriano in Siria (Pietro Metastasio) (Carnaval 1754, Lisboa, Salvaterra)
- L'Ipermestra (Pietro Metastasio) (31 Mar. 1754, Lisboa, Teatro Real Corte)
- Il re pastore (Pietro Metastasio) (Spring 1756, Cremona)
- Solimano (Textdichter unbekannt), 3 acts (31 Mar. 1758, Lisbon, Teatro de la Ajuda)
- Arminio (Antonio Salvi), Pasticcio (1760, London, King's Theatre)
- Creusa in Delfo (Gaetano Martinelli), dramma per musica 2 acts (Carnaval, 1774 Lisbon, Salvaterra)
- Attributed Astarto (1743 Palermo); Medea (1744, Palermo); L'isola incantata (1746 Palermo)

== Church music ==
The two long periods of employment Perez had during his life gave him enormous opportunities to write for the church, and religious music represents the largest and most elaborate part of his output. In his earliest career he is reported by Florimo to have 'enriched with his compositions' Palermo's Cappella Palatina, but there are many pieces written for Naples as well. In Lisbon, the deep religiosity of his pupil, the Royal Princess Maria and his own, combined with the directions taken by the musical policy of the court, had himself concentrating in church music for the royal chapels for the last 23 years of his life. His first mass is dated February 1736, and most of his early works have very ample and careful use of orchestral and choral resources. For example, the mass dated 24 February 1740 is scored for two choirs (the final 'cum Sancto Spiritu' is a ten voice fugue), full strings divided, in some sections, in two orchestras, woodwinds (no clarinets), horns and trumpets in pairs. It displays a highly detailed orchestral writing: muted strings, seconda corda instructed in passages for the violins, plenty of orchestral crescendos and diminuendos, solo parts for the woodwinds and for the viola. In this period, Perez treated solo voices in a manner similar to operatic arias, most fugues or fugato sections have very symmetrical entries of themes, and the pieces in the so-called stile antico are conservative in harmony and notation.

Unlike the operas, there is no definite date when it is possible to see a change in the style of Perez's late church music. However, the production in his later years at Lisbon is quite distinct from his earliest. The orchestral writing continued to be as detailed as before, but instruments like recorders and lutes are no longer to be found. There is less use of separated sections for solo voices. Most pieces are now concertate, that is, with one or more soloists emerging from the choir for short passages, thus creating numerous distinct vocal textures. A striking difference is the counterpoint technique, that, still being strict, became eloquent and sentimental. Now the pieces rarely show distinct sections in modern style and in archaistic counterpoint. In his later style, the musical presentation of the words acquired a pietist overtone. The sections alternate freely between polyphonic and chordal writing; the harmony is constantly elaborate; chromaticism is freely used. It is however a style that strongly favours variety over coherence, as there is not regular thematic recurrence throughout the pieces.

Eighteenth century critics often ranked Perez with Hasse and Jommelli. Charles Burney found 'an original spirit and elegance in all his production'. Nineteenth and twentieth century commentary, based for the most part on very few earlier operas, has generally downgraded this judgement. A more complete examination of his works affirms the stature his contemporaries assigned to him. While he was essentially a transitional figure in eighteenth-century opera, he was nevertheless one of the great composers of opera seria. However it was in his later compositions for the church that Perez had the best possibility to develop his style. His is one of the finest corpuses of music for the Roman Catholic rituals in the eighteenth century.

=== List of church music ===
- Dottori, Mauricio. List of David Perez's Church Music at

== Discography ==
- Mattutino de' morti by Davide Perez, Ghislieri Choir & Consort, Giulio Prandi, Invernizzi, Vitale, (Sony International - Deutsche Harmonia Mundi) 2014.
