= Center for Retrospective Digitization =

Online archive of academic journals

The Center for Retrospective Digitization in Göttingen (German: Göttinger DigitalisierungsZentrum, GDZ) is an online system for archiving academic journals maintained by the University of Göttingen.

== See also ==
- JSTOR
- List of retrodigitized Mathematics Journals and Monographs
