= Opernhaus am Zwinger =

Former opera house in Dresden

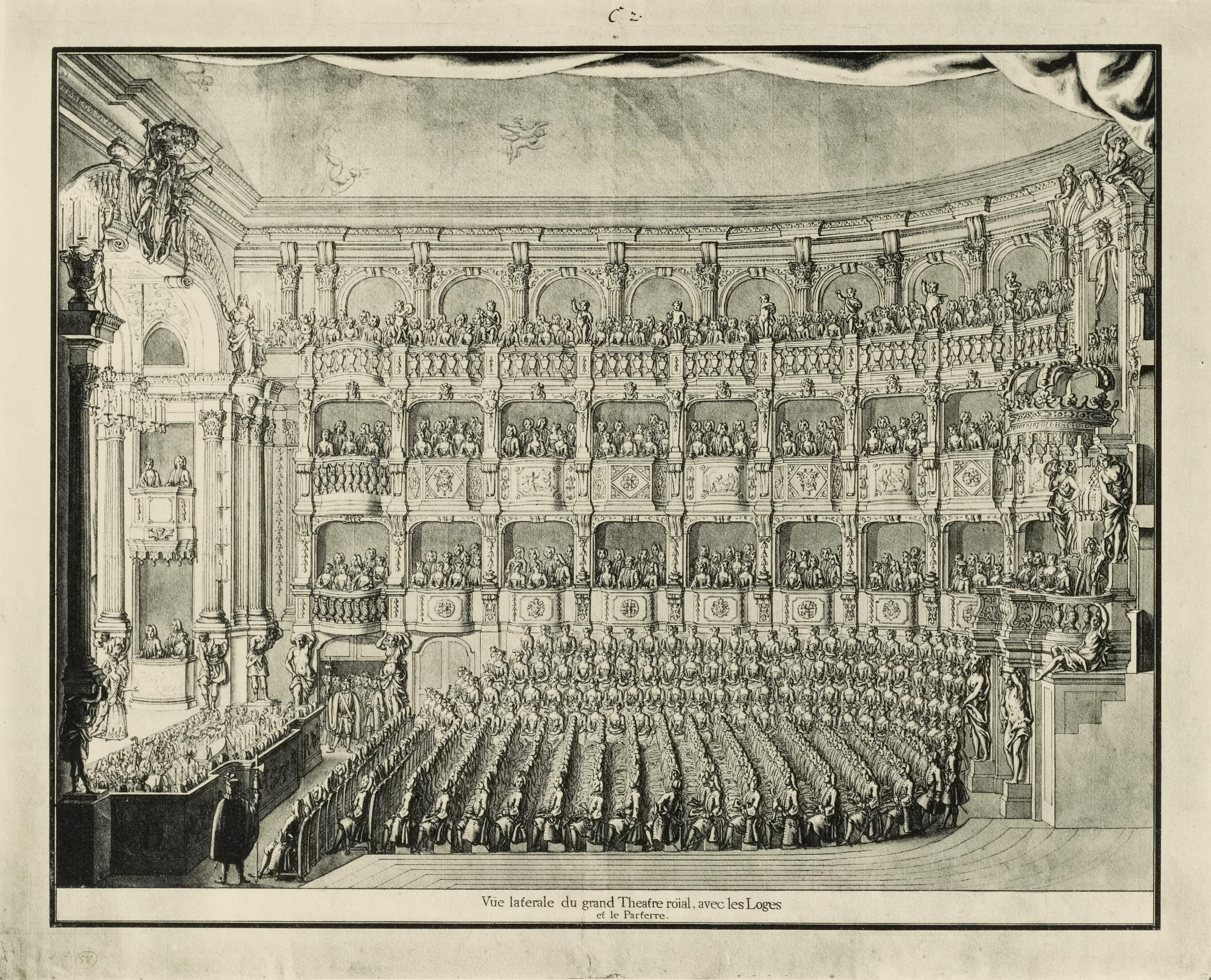
- Interior
- Interactive map of Opernhaus am Zwinger

General information
- Type: Opera house
- Architectural style: Baroque
- Location: Dresden, Germany
- Coordinates: 51.0597°N 13.7339°E
- Construction started: 1718
- Opened: 1719
- Destroyed: 1849

Design and construction
- Architect: Matthäus Daniel Pöppelmann

The Opernhaus am Zwinger (Opera house at the Zwinger) was a theatre in Dresden, Saxony, Germany, opened in 1719. The architect of the Zwinger, Matthäus Daniel Pöppelmann, was also responsible for the opera house situated next to its south-western pavilion. The building replaced the first opera house of Dresden, the Opernhaus am Taschenberg, which was transformed to a church.

The three-tier hall seated up to 2000 people and was at the time one of the largest opera houses in Europe. The first performance was on 3 September 1719 Antonio Lotti's Giovi in Argo, followed on 13 September by the premiere of Lotti's Teofane on the occasion of the wedding of prince Friedrich August II, later the elector and as August III king of Poland, and Maria Josepha of Austria. The house flourished when he, an opera enthusiast, reigned as elector, and Johann Adolph Hasse was musical director. Due to the Seven Years' War, the last opera, Hasse's Olimpiade, was performed in 1756. The building was used for balls and concerts. It burned down during the May Uprising in Dresden in 1849. The next opera house, the Semperoper, was built at a different location.
