= List of operas by Giuseppe Bonno =

This is a list of operas by Giuseppe Bonno, also known as Josef or Josephus Johannes Baptizta Bon, (1711–1788).

== List ==
Title	Genre	Subdivisions	Libretto	Première date	Place, theatre	Notes
Nigella e Nise	pastorale		Giovanni Claudio Pasquini	1732	Naples	
L'amore insuperabile	festa di camera	1 act	Giovanni Claudio Pasquini	26 July 1736	Vienna, Burgtheater	
Trajano	festa di camera	1 act	Giovanni Claudio Pasquini	1 October 1736	Vienna Burgtheater	
La gara del genio con Giunone	serenata	1 act	Giovanni Claudio Pasquini	13 May 1737	Laxenburg	
Alessandro Severo	festa di camera	1 act	Giovanni Claudio Pasquini	1 October 1737	Vienna, Burgtheater	
La generosità di Artaserse	festa di camera		Giovanni Claudio Pasquini	4 November 1737	Vienna, Burgtheater	
?	pastorale	2 acts		19 November 1737	Vienna, Burgtheater	
La pace richiamata	festa di camera		Giovanni Claudio Pasquini	26 July 1738	Vienna, Burgtheater	
La pietà di Numa	festa di camera	1 act	Giovanni Claudio Pasquini	1 October 1738	Vienna, Burgtheater	
La vera nobilità	festa di camera		Giovanni Claudio Pasquini	26 July 1739	Vienna, Burgtheater	
Il natale di Numa Pompilio	festa di camera	1 act	Giovanni Claudio Pasquini	1 October 1739	Vienna, Burgtheater	
Il nume d'Atene	festa di camera			19 November 1739	Vienna, Burgtheater	
La generosa Spartana	serenata	1 act	Giovanni Claudio Pasquini	13 May 1740	Laxenburg	
Il natale di Giove	azione teatrale	1 act	Metastasio	1 October 1740	Vienna, Teatro della Favorita	
Catone in Utica (with other composers)				1742	Vienna, Burgtheater	
Il vero omaggio	componimento drammatico	1 act	Metastasio	13 March 1743	Vienna, Schlosstheater Schönbrunn	
Danae					unperformed?	composed 1744, now lost
Ezio					unperformed?	composed 1749, now lost
L'Armida placata (with Wagenseil, Luca Antonio Predieri, Hasse, and Abos)	pasticcio			8 October 1750	Vienna, Burgtheater	
Il re pastore	dramma per musica	3 acts	Metastasio	27 October 1751	Vienna, Schlosstheater Schönbrunn	
L'eroe cinese	dramma per musica	3 acts	Metastasio	13 May 1752	Vienna, Schlosstheater Schönbrunn	
L'isola disabitata	azione teatrale	1 act	Metastasio	23 September 1754	Vienna, Burgtheater	
Didone abbandonata			Metastasio		unperformed?	composed 1752, now lost
L'Atenaide ovvero Gli affetti più generosi	azione teatrale	2 acts	Metastasio		unperformed?	composed 1762
Il sogno di Scipione			Metastasio		unperformed?	composed 1763
