= Luca Antonio Predieri =

Italian composer (1688-1767)

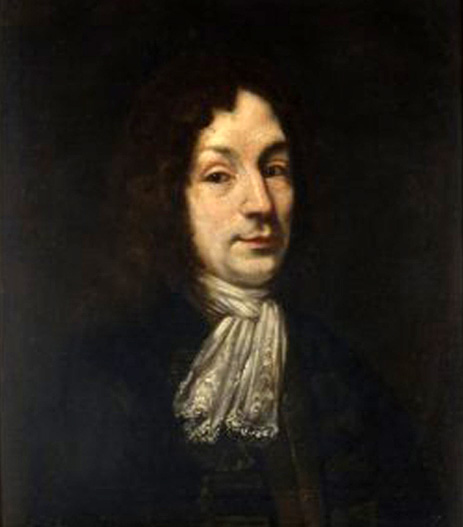
Luca Antonio Predieri

Luca Antonio Predieri (13 September 1688 – 3 January 1767) was an Italian composer and violinist. A member of a prominent family of musicians, Predieri was born in Bologna and was active there from 1704. In 1737 he moved to Vienna, eventually becoming Kapellmeister to the imperial Habsburg court in 1741, a post he held for ten years. In 1765 he returned to his native city where he died two years later at the age of 78. A prolific opera composer, he was also known for his sacred music and oratorios. Although his operas were largely forgotten by the end of his own lifetime and most of their scores lost, individual arias as well some of his sacred music are still performed and recorded.

== Life ==
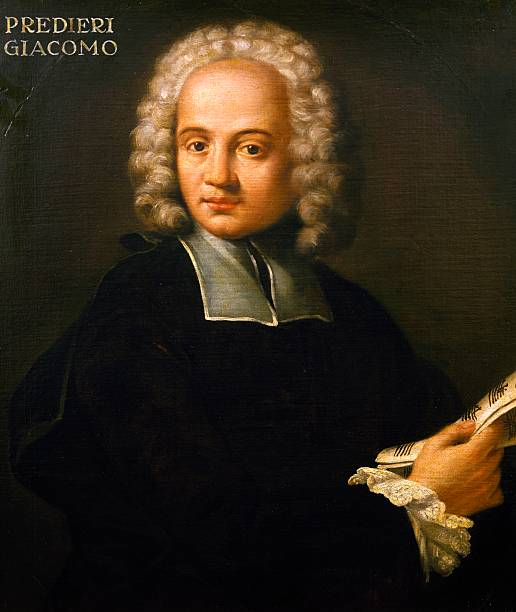
Predieri's uncle and teacher, Giacomo Cesare Predieri

The son of Vitale Predieri and Maria Menzani, Predieri was born in Bologna to a prominent family of musicians which included organist and composer Giacomo Maria Predieri (1611–1695), singer Antonio Predieri (1650–1710), singer and composer Angelo Predieri (1655–1731), and singer and composer Giacomo Cesare Predieri (1671-1753). He studied the violin with Abondio Bini and Tommaso Vitali, and counterpoint with Giacomo Cesare Predieri, Angelo Predieri, and Giacomo Antonio Perti. He is recorded as having been a viola player in the orchestra of the Basilica of San Petronio in Bologna at the age of 16 and later served as a violinist there from 1706 to 1711. By 1715 he had composed his first oratorio, Santi Cipriano e Giustina (Saints Cyprian and Justina), and five operas, the first of which, La Partenope, inaugurated the Marsigli-Rossi theatre on 28 October 1710. Predieri's compositions gained him an appointment to the Accademia Filarmonica di Bologna in 1716. In 1723 he was elected its Principe (literally "Prince", but the Academy's traditional name for its presiding officer) In addition to his duties at the Accademia, Predieri served as the maestro di capella (music director) at various churches in Bologna including San Paolo Maggiore, Madonna di Galliera, Santa Maria della Vita, and lastly the Cathedral of San Pietro. By the time he left Bologna in 1737 he had composed 25 operas, five oratorios, many pieces of church music, and several secular instrumental works.

Predieri became known in Vienna through performances there of his operas, Amor Prigioniero in 1731, and Il sogno di Scipione, first performed in 1735 as part of the birthday celebrations for Emperor Charles VI. Following the death of Antonio Caldara in December 1736, Johann Fux (at the time Kapellmeister to Charles VI), invited Predieri to Vienna to serve as his assistant. Predieri arrived there towards the end of 1737 and in 1739 was officially appointed Vice Kapellmeister, the post previously held by Caldara. On Fux's death in 1741, he assumed to the duties of Kapellmeister, although he did not use the official title until 1746. During his time in Vienna he composed several more operas, often performed to mark special occasions at the imperial court, two oratorios, a Stabat Mater, and many other pieces of sacred music. Predieri retired as Kapellmeister in 1751, but kept his title and his salary for the remainder of his time in Vienna even though Georg Reutter had taken over his duties. In 1765, he returned to his native Bologna where he died on 3 January 1767 at the age of 78.

== Works ==
According to musicologist Anne Schnoebelen, Predieri's sacred music demonstrated his "mastery of vocal polyphony and polychoral writing" while the operas he composed in Vienna to texts by Metastasio and Giovanni Pasquini were marked by carefully set recitatives and arias with impressive dynamic colouring. The imperial court in Vienna made extensive use of trumpets for ceremonial occasions and employed 14 court trumpeters. In common with those of his predecessors at the court, Fux and Caldara, Predieri's Viennese operas and oratorios contained what Trevor Herbert has described as "spectacular high trumpet parts surpassing all others anywhere in terms of range and technical difficulty." An example of this can be seen in the aria "Pace una volta" from his 1740 opera Zenobia.

By the end of Predieri's lifetime, his operas were no longer performed, having been superseded by the reforms to the genre initiated by Jommelli and furthered by Gluck. Most of the scores for his operas and oratorios have been lost or survive only in fragments. Today, his most well-known composition is the Stabat Mater he wrote in Vienna, but he also composed many other pieces of church music, both for choir and solo voice, as well as a number of secular cantatas and instrumental pieces which have extant scores. Some of his works have received modern editions, including his Violin Concerto in B minor, a Stabat Mater, and the aria "Pace una volta". The following is a list of Predieri's principal works.

=== Operas and oratorios ===
Operas

- La Partenope (Parthenope), libretto by Silvio Stampiglia, premiered Bologna, Teatro Marsigli-Rossi, 28 October 1710 for the inauguration of the theatre (score lost)
- La virtù in trionfo o sia La Griselda (The triumph of virtue, or Griselda) dramma per musica in three acts, libretto by Tomaso Stanzani after Apostolo Zeno, premiered Bologna, Teatro Marsigli-Rossi, 18 Oct 1711 (score lost apart from the aria "Fa' di me ciò che ti piace")
- La Giuditta (Judith), libretto by Francesco Silvani, premiered Ancona, Teatro La Fenice, 1713 (score lost)
- Lucio Papirio (Lucius Papirius), libretto by Antonio Salvi, premiered Pratolino, Villa Medici, 1714; performed in Rome the same year and in Venice in 1715 (score lost apart from 4 arias)
- Astarte, libretto by Apostolo Zeno and Pietro Pariati, premiered Rome, Teatro Capranica, 1715 (score lost)
- Il pazzo per politica, libretto by Giovanni Battista Gianoli, premiered Livorno, Teatro San Sebastiano, 1717 (score lost)
- Il duello d'amore e di vendetta, (The duel of love and revenge), dramma giocoso in three acts, librettist Francesco Salvi, premiered Livorno, Teatro San Sebastiano, 1718 (score lost)
- La fede ne' tradimenti (Faith amidst treachery), libretto by Girolamo Gigli, premiered Florence, Teatro della Pergola, 1718 (score lost)
- Merope (Merope), libretto by Apostolo Zeno and Pietro Pariati, premiered Livorno, Teatro San Sebastiano, 1718 (score lost)
- Anagilda, libretto by Girolamo Gigli, premiered Turin, Teatro Carignano, 1719 (score lost)
- Il trionfo della virtù (The triumph of virtue), libretto by Francesco Pecori, premiered Florence, Teatro della Pergola, 1719 (score lost)
- Il trionfo di Solimano, ovvero Il trionfo maggiore è vincere se stesso (The triumph of Suleiman, or The greatest triumph is to conquer oneself), libretto by Francesco Pecori, premiered Florence, Teatro della Pergola, summer 1719 (score lost)
- La finta pazzia di Diana (The feigned madness of Diana), dramma pastorale in 3 acts, librettist unknown, premiered Florence, Teatro della Pergola, 1719; also performed in Venice and Vienna in 1748 (score lost)
- Astarto, libretto by Apostolo Zeno and Pietro Pariati, dramma per musica in 3 acts, premiered Florence, Teatro della Pergola, 1720 (score lost)
- Tito Manlio (Titus Manlius), libretto by Matteo Noris, premiered Florence, Teatro della Pergola, 1720 (score lost)
- Sofonisba, libretto by Francesco Silvani, premiered Rome, Teatro Alibert, 1722 with Farinelli in the title role. (score lost apart from the aria "Ricordati o bella che un caro tuo sguardo")
- Scipione (Scipio), libretto by Apostolo Zeno, premiered Rome, Teatro Alibert, 1724 with Farinelli in the role of Salonice (score lost apart from 3 arias)
- Cesare in Egitto (Caesar in Egypt), libretto by Giacomo Francesco Bussani, premiered Rome, Teatro Capranica, 1728 (score lost apart from 4 arias)
- Astianatte (Astyanax), libretto by Antonio Salvi, premiered Alessandria, Teatro Soleri, autumn 1729 (score lost)
- Eurene, libretto by Claudio Nicola Stampa, Milan, Teatro Regio Ducale, 1729; revised as Sirbace, premiered Pistoia, Teatro degli Accademici dei Risvegliati, 2 July 1730 (score lost)
- Ezio (Aetius), libretto by Metastasio, premiered Milan, Teatri Regio Ducal, 1730 (score lost)
- Alessandro nell'Indie (Alexander in India), libretto by Metastasio, premiered Milan, Teatro Regio Ducale, 1731 (score lost)
- Scipione il giovane (Scipio the Younger), libretto attributed to Giovanni Francesco Bortolotti, premiered Venice, Teatro San Giovanni Grisostomo, 19 November 1731 with Antonio Bernacchi in the title role
- Amor prigionero (Amor imprisoned), libretto by Metastasio, premiered Vienna, 1732
- Il sogno di Scipione (The dream of Scipio), azione teatrale in 1 act, libretto by Metastasio, first performed 1735 during the birthday celebrations for Emperor Charles VI, revived in 1739
- Zoe, libretto by Francesco Silvani revised from his La forza del sangue, premiered Venice, Teatro San Cassiano, 10 November 1736 (score lost)
- Gli auguri spiegati, libretto by Giovanni Claudio Pasquini, premiered Laxenburg, 3 May 1738
- La pace tra la virtù e la bellezza (Peace between virtue and beauty), libretto by Metastasio, premiered Vienna, 15 October 1738
- Perseo (Perseus), festa di camera, libretto by Giovanni Claudio Pasquini, premiered Vienna, 4 November 1738
- Astrea placata, ossia La felicità della terra (Astraea placated, or Happiness returns to the earth), festa di camera , libretto by Metastasio, premiered Vienna, 28 August 1739
- Zenobia (Zenobia), libretto by Metastasio, first setting, Vienna, Favorita Palace, 28 August 1740
- Armida placata (Armida placated), pasticcio (composed in collaboration with Wagenseil, Hasse, Bonno, and Abos), libretto by Giovanni Ambrogio Migliavacca, premiered Vienna 1750 on the occasion of the birthday of Empress Elisabeth Christine

Oratorios

- Santi Cipriano e Giustina martiri (Saints Cyprian and Justina, martyrs) Bologna, Church of Santa Maria della Vita, first performed 17 March 1712 (score lost)
- L'Adamo, (Adam) text by Girolamo Melani, first performed Bologna, Church of La Madonna di Galliera, 1723 (score lost)
- La caduta di Gerusalemme (The fall of Jerusalem), first performed Bologna, Church of Santa Maria della Vita, 1st Thursday of Lent, 1727 (score lost)
- San Pellegrino Laziosi (Saint Peregrine Laziosi), first performed Bologna, Church of La Madonna di Galliera, 1729; also performed in Cento as I prodigi del crocifisso nella conversione di S Pellegrino Laziosi, 1734
- Gesù nel tempio (Jesus in the temple), first performed Bologna, Church of Santa Maria della Vita, 31 March 1735 (score lost)
- Il sacrificio d'Abramo (The sacrifice of Abraham), text by Francesca Menzoni-Giusti, first performed Vienna, 1738
- Isacco figura del Redentore (Isaac, figure of the Redeemer), first performed Vienna, 12 February 1740

=== Sacred music ===
In addition to the following, Predieri also composed numerous other masses and mass parts, antiphons, and psalms, for churches in Bologna and for the imperial court in Vienna.

- Stabat Mater (SATB chorus, 2 violins, viola, cello, contrabass and organ continuo)
- Lamentations for Holy Week: Mercoledì Santo (soprano and basso continuo), Giovedì Santo (contralto and basso continuo), Venerdì Santo (soprano and basso continuo)
- Motets: Dulcis plaga, Ecce dies, Super astra in corde meo, Tuba canit (all for solo voice and orchestra)
- Te Deum (SATB chorus and orchestra)
- Hymn: Inno alla Beata Vergine Maria (SATB chorus and orchestra)
- Ave Maris Stella (SATB chorus and orchestra; 3 versions composed in 1738, 1740, 1746)
- Magnificat (SATB chorus and orchestra; 3 versions composed in 1739, 1740, 1746)
- Missa Sanctissimi Francisci (Mass for the feast of Saint Francis; SATB chorus, 2 trumpets 2 violins and 2 trombones; composed 1746)
- Missa Nativitatis (Christmas Mass; SATB chorus, trumpets and violins; composed 1747)

=== Secular music ===
- Concerto in B minor for violin and string orchestra
- Cantatas: "Quel ruscel che tra sassi si frange" and "Or che Lidia adorata"
- Aria: "Doppio tormento m'affanna"
- Sonatas for harspichord in G major, C major, and D major
- Sinfonia in B-flat major

== Recordings ==
Two of Predieri's Lamentations for solo voice and basso continuo can heard on Baroque Nocturnes For The Liturgy Of Holy Week performed by the La Flora ensemble (Bongiovanni Records). "Pace una volta", an aria for soprano and solo trumpet from his opera Zenobia was recorded by Kathleen Battle and Wynton Marsalis on their album Baroque Duet (Sony Classical).
