= Livia Accarigi =

Italian poet (1719–1786)

Countess Livia Accarigi
- Born: 1719; Siena, Italy
- Died: 15 August 1786 (aged 67); Siena, Italy
- Occupations: Poet, dramatist
- Notable work: Rime (1758); Tomiri (1762); Componimento drammatico (1767)
- Movement: Arcadianism

Livia Accarigi (/ɑːkəˈriːdʒi/; ah-kə-REE-jee; sometimes spelled Accarisi; 1719 – 15 August 1786) was an Italian poet, noblewoman, and literary figure from Siena. Active in the mid-to-late eighteenth century, she was a member of the improvisatori and considered a leading improvisational poet.

She was a member of the Academy of Arcadians from 1743 to 1766, writing under the pastoral pen name Delinda Calcidica. She collaborated with Pietro Metastasio, the most celebrated Italian poet and librettist of the era. He reviewed her tragedy about Tomyris, written in 1762 but never published.

Originally writing anonymously, she began attributing her name to written works after her poetry began to enjoy popularity. Surviving works include excerpts of poetic verse and a drama. She is counted among the most notable learned women of Tuscany in the 1770s by the poet and critic Aurelio de' Giorgi Bertola.

== Biography ==
Accarigi was born in Siena, a city in the Grand Duchy of Tuscany. Contemporary publications describe her as a nobil donna, indicating that she was born into a Sienese noble family. Her parents were Elisabetta and Alfonso Accarigi.

She received an education in literature, physics, and moral philosophy from her parents suited to her "precocious intelligence" and lively "passion for study". An abbot named Pasquini frequented the Accarigi house and pushed her to present her works to the public. She first performed her poetry to Leopold II, Holy Roman Emperor and his wife Maria Luisa of Spain through song.

Siena in the eighteenth century had an active literary circle centered on civic academies. The city was connected to broader Italian literary movements following the Age of Enlightenment and had its own Arcadian colony. She enrolled in the Arcadian academy in 1743 and took the pastoral pseudonym of Delinda Calcidica (Delinda of Chalcidice). Accarigi was influenced by writers in Florence and Rome and was involved with the academy until 1766. She never married or had children.

=== Arcadian circle and literary reputation ===
Accarigi was a participant in the culture of the Academy of Arcadians, an influential literary institution founded in Rome in 1690 that dominated Italian letter composition throughout the eighteenth century. The Academy, established in honor of Christina, Queen of Sweden, promoted a classical and bucolic reform of Italian poetry in contrast to the elaborate ornamentation of Baroque compositions, especially Marinism. Notably, women were permitted to join the academy. Each member took on a pastoral pseudonym, and Accarigi used the name Gentile Faresia. She initially published her poetry anonymously but revealed her authorship when her poems began to enjoy popularity.

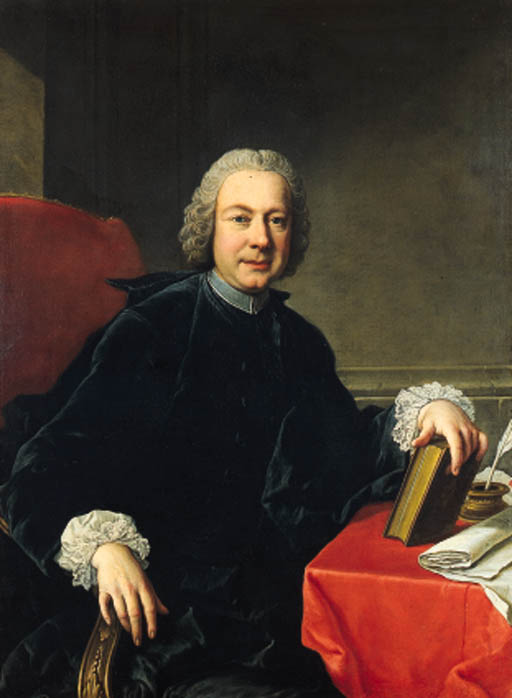
Pietro Metastasio, a supporter of her literary work (c. 1770)

The most direct evidence of her standing comes from the correspondence of Aurelio de' Giorgi Bertola (1753–1798), a prominent poet and critic. In a letter to the scholar Giovanni Cristofano Amaduzzi dated November 1774, Bertola described himself as bound in friendship with many celebrated women of Tuscany, singling out Accarigi and the poet Maria Fortuna (known under her Arcadian name of Iside) as figures he particularly valued. His accounts suggest that Accarigi worked at the center of a circle of learned Tuscan women that included figures like Maria Maddalena Morelli (Arcadian name of Corilla Olimpica) who were particularly adept at improvisational poetry. The genre saw a flourishing of activity from women between 1700 and 1850 and included Rosa Taddei, Teresa Gnoli, and Beatrice di Pian degli Ontani.

Accarigi is also known to have exchanged letters with Pietro Metastasio (1698–1782), the Vienna-based poeta cesareo whose lyric dramas and verse dominated European literary taste in the mid-eighteenth century, between 1762 and 1764. Metastasio had been adopted as a child by the Arcadian founder Gian Vincenzo Gravina and maintained an enormous correspondence with Italian literary figures throughout his career.

She died of apoplexy in Siena on 15 August 1786, aged 67.

== Works ==
Accarigi often wrote anonymously, and all of Accarigi's surviving works appear in anthologies rather than as independent novels or poetry collections. From her letters with Metastasio, it is apparent that she composed a tragedy on the subject of Tomyris, the Scythian queen celebrated in antiquity for her defeat of Cyrus the Great, in 1762. In one of his letters to her, Metastasio critiqued her handling of the heroine's dramatic arc: following a precedent set by the playwright Marc'Antonio Ingegneri, Accarigi had Tomyris undergo an abrupt change of character near the play's conclusion, but unlike Ingegneri, without softening the transition through repentance. The result, Metastasio argued, was a "duplicity of character" as jarring to dramatic principles as parallel fifths are to musical harmony, since the heroine retains heroic and grandiose sentiments incompatible with her supposed conversion. He believed that the complexity and nuance of the character did not suit the theater, which demands clearly defined characters. The tragedy was apparently never published; a contemporary critic described its loss as regrettable given the exceptional talent of its author and the distinguished guidance she had received.

Some of her poetry was published in a wedding anthology printed in 1758 by the Pallade press in Rome. The volume celebrated the marriage between the Corsini and Barberini families, two of Rome's most distinguished aristocratic houses. Her inclusion in a publication of such prestige and social reach demonstrates the extent of her influence outside of Siena.

In 1767, Accarigi contributed a componimento drammatico, a short dramatic or cantata-like piece, to a volume of commemorative poetry published in Siena by the printer Francesco Rossi. The work was produced to honor the ceremonial arrival of distinguished visitors to the city. Such pieces were a standard genre of academic literary culture in eighteenth-century Italy, commissioned to mark important political events. No standalone volume of her verse is known to survive.
