= Gnoli =

Gnoli is a surname of Italian origin. Notable people with the surname include:

- Claudio Tommaso Gnoli (born 1969), Italian information scientist
- Domenico Gnoli (author) (1839–1915), Italian author
- Domenico Gnoli (painter) (1933–1970), Italian painter and stage designer
- Raniero Gnoli (1930–2025), Italian Orientalist and historian
