= Marianna Martines =

Austrian composer, singer, and pianist

Marianne von Martinez
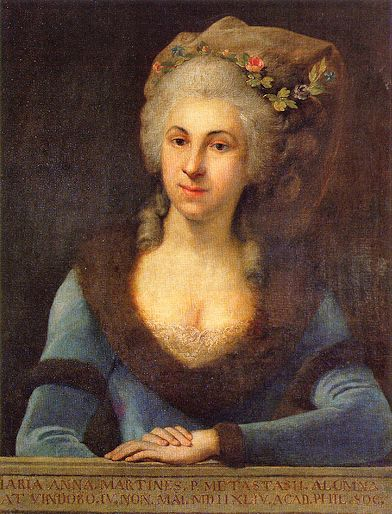
- Portrait of Marianna Martines by Anton von Maron, dated by Lorenz ca. 1773 (Note: For discussion, including translation of the inscription at the bottom of the portrait, see this blog article by Michael Lorenz.)
- Born: 4 May 1744; Vienna, Austria
- Died: 13 December 1812 (aged 68); Vienna, Austria
- Occupations: Composer; pianist; singer
- Father: Nicolo Martines
- Relatives: Joseph Martines (brother)

Marianna Martines, also Marianne von Martinez (Note: "Martinez" is often employed in older reference sources; however, there is no primary source in Vienna in which the name of the family is actually spelled thus. The composer always signed herself "Marianna von Martines". See: Verlassenschaftsabhandlung Maria Theresia Martines, A-Whh, OMaA, Gruppe II, 54/1775. See also the Wiener Diarium of 4 August 1773) (4 May 1744 – 13 December 1812), was an Austrian composer, pianist, and singer of the Classical period, based in Vienna.

== Early life ==
Marianna Martines's paternal grandfather was a Spanish soldier who had settled in Naples. Her father, Nicolo Martines, grew up there and for a time pursued a career as a soldier. He later changed careers, serving in Vienna as Maestro di Camera (major-domo) at the papal nuncio; that is, the Pope's embassy to the Austrian Empire. For service to the Empire, Marianna's brother Joseph in 1774 acquired a patent of nobility, hence the "von" in the family surname.

In his youth in Italy, Nicolo had befriended the poet Pietro Trapassi, who wrote under the name Metastasio. The latter had risen in eminence, to the point that in 1730 he was called to Vienna to serve as the Poet Laureate of the Empire. Metastasio resided with the Martines family for the entire rest of his life (from about 1734 to 1782). His presence would prove crucial to Marianne's career.

The Martines family lived in an apartment in a large building on the Michaelerplatz in Vienna, "a stately building still standing in the Kohlmarkt", the so-called "Altes Michaelerhaus". As was common in the days before elevators, the floors of the building corresponded to the social class of the inhabitants. On the lowest floor were the rooms of the dowager princess of the wealthy Esterházy family. The Martines family were on the third floor. Another resident of the middle floors was Nicola Porpora, a well-known Italian singing teacher and composer. At the very top, in a cold and leaky attic room, lived a struggling young composer, Joseph Haydn, who was trying to make his way as a freelance musician. The lives of all of these people ultimately came to be connected, in part through Marianna Martines. (Note: The only connection not related is that Haydn ultimately became the Kapellmeister for the Esterházy family, including the dowager's sons Paul Anton and Nicolaus.)

She was born into this home in 1744. Though baptized Anna Catherina, she chose to go by the name Marianna.

Metastasio, the family friend, made it a practice to help out with the raising and careers of the Martines children; for instance, at one point he helped Giuseppe obtain an important job as custodian of the Imperial Library. In the case of Marianna, he noticed her precocious talents early, and thus came to oversee her education, musical and otherwise.

He first arranged for her to take keyboard lessons from Haydn, whom Metastasio had met as a result of their living in the same building. These lessons began when Marianna was aged seven, and lasted until she was ten. When she turned ten, Marianna began singing lessons with Porpora, who had also met Haydn and taken him on as his assistant; Haydn played the harpsichord while Porpora taught Marianne to sing.

Soon after Marianna began her music lessons she demonstrated a talent for composition, so she began still further lessons with Johann Adolph Hasse and the Imperial court composer Giuseppe Bonno.

Metastasio also saw to it that Marianna received a thorough general education, which far surpassed what was considered standard for women of her social class at that time. She was a native speaker of both Italian and German, and in an autobiographical letter to Padre Martini indicated that she had good command of French. The musicologist Charles Burney, visiting Vienna, found that she also could speak English.

== Career as performer and composer ==
Already as a child Martines was good enough to perform before the Imperial court, where according to Helene Wessely, she "attracted attention with her beautiful voice and her keyboard playing." The adult Marianna was frequently asked to perform before the Empress Maria Theresa.

A number of the works that Martines composed are set for solo voice, and her biographers (Godt, Wessely) conjecture that the first singer of these works was their composer. If so, they constitute further evidence for her ability, as the music shows a "predilection for coloratura passages, leaps over wide intervals and trills indicat[ing] that she herself must have been an excellent singer." (Wessely).

Martines wrote a number of secular cantatas and two oratorios to Italian texts. These texts are, naturally enough, the work of her mentor Metastasio.

Her surviving compositions include four masses, six motets, and three litanies for choir. She wrote in the Italian style, as was typical for the early Classical period in Vienna. Her harpsichord performance practice was compared to the style of C.P.E. Bach. Martines's compositions were well regarded in her time, and some scholars have suggested that Mozart modeled his 1768 Mass, V. 139, after the "Christe" of Martines's Mass No. 1 in D major. The Michaelerkirche (St. Michael's Church, next door to the Martines home), saw a performance of her third mass in 1761. Her fourth mass was completed in 1765.

== Later life ==
Martines's name and music were known throughout Europe, and she was admitted to the Accademia Filarmonica of Bologna in 1773, the first woman to gain admission.

Her Italian oratorio Isacco figura del redentore was premiered by massive forces in concerts (17 and 19 March 1782) of the Tonkünstler-Societät, a long-standing series that also performed large-scale works by Haydn, Mozart, Beethoven, and Handel. The vocal soloists included Caterina Cavalieri and Ludwig Fischer.

Martines and her sister, neither of whom ever married, looked after their family friend Metastasio until his death in 1782. Metastasio left his estate to the Martines family; Marianna received 20,000 florins, Metastasio's harpsichord, and his music library. Marianna and her sister hosted musical soirees at their home. These weekly musical events attracted many distinguished guests, including Haydn and Irish tenor Michael Kelly. Mozart also was a frequent guest at the soirees and composed four-hand piano sonatas to perform with Marianne.

Though she was an active and highly accomplished performer and composer she never sought an appointed position; it would have been unacceptable for a woman in her social class to seek such employment.

Her last known public appearance was on 23 March 1808, attending a performance of Haydn's oratorio Die Schöpfung conducted by Salieri, in tribute to the composer. She died on 13 December 1812 and was buried in St. Marx's Cemetery.

== List of surviving works ==
2 oratorios; 4 masses; 6 motets; psalm cantatas; secular cantatas; 3 keyboard sonatas, 3 keyboard concertos; and 1 symphony.

Several of her pieces have been published in recent years. The three keyboard sonatas (in E Major, G Major and A Major) are available through Hildegard Publishing. Many works are also available through Furore-Verlag, a German publisher that specializes in works by women composers. They offer many first publications, including: the Keyboard Concerto in A; Dixit Dominus for Soli, Choir and Orchestra; In Exitu Israel de Agypto, Psalm for Soli, Choir and Orchestra; Laudate Pueri Dominum, Psalm 112, for SATB choir and orchestra; the Fourth Mass. The Symphony in C (Sinfonia), edited by Nan H. Washburn, is available through Women's Philharmonic Advocacy.

== Discography ==
- Martines: The Complete Keyboard Works. Idith Meshulam Korman, Oxford Philharmonic Orchestra, Cayenna Ponchione-Bailey. Signum Records SIGCD934, 2026. Compact disc.
- Marianna Martines: "Il primo amore". concertos and cantatas. Núria Rial, DHM 2011 Compact disc.
- Marianna Martines: Psalm 110 Dixit Dominus; Psalm 151 Come le limpide onde; Symphony in C major. Salzburger Hofmusik, Wolfgang Brunner. CPO Records 777985-2, 2021. Compact disc.
- Marianna Martines: Psalm Cantatas. Elke Mascha Blankenburg, Koch Schwann B000001SOK, 1995. Compact disc.
- Sinfonia in C. Bay Area Women's Philharmonic; JoAnn Falletta, conductor. Newport Classics NCD 60102, 1990.

Selections:

- on 18th Century Woman Composers. Barbara Harbach, fortepiano. Gasparo Records: B000025YJJ, 1995. Compact Disc.
- on Haydn, Martines and Auenbrugger. Monica Jakuc Leverett, fortepiano. Titanic, B000001I7X, 1993. Compact disc.
- on Spanish Piano Concertos. Concerto for piano and orchestra in A major. Melani Mestre, conductor & piano. Hänssler, CD HC20016, 2021. Compact Disc.
- on Woman Composers and the Men in Their Lives. Leanne Rees, Fleur de Son, B0000479BH, 2000. Compact disc.

== Bibliography ==
- Engel, Judith Valerie (2025). "Marianna Martines at the keyboard: music, agency, and self-fashioning". PhD Thesis, University of Oxford.
- Godt, Irving (1995). "Marianna in Italy: The International Reputation of Marianna Martines". The Journal of Musicology. 13 (4). University of California Press: 538–61. doi:10.2307/763898. eISSN 1533-8347. ISSN 0277-9269. JSTOR 763898.
- Godt, Irving (1998). "Marianna in Vienna: A Martines Chronology". The Journal of Musicology. 16 (1). University of California Press: 136–58. doi:10.2307/764080. eISSN 1533-8347. ISSN 0277-9269. JSTOR 764080.
- Godt, Irving (2010). Rice, John A. (ed.). Marianna Martines: A Woman Composer in the Vienna of Mozart and Haydn. Eastman Studies in Music (New ed.). University of Rochester Press. ISBN 978-1-58046-351-5. ISSN 1071-9989. JSTOR 10.7722/j.ctt7zsvc0.
- Harer, Ingeborg (2004). Martines, Marianna von. Die Musik in Geschichte und Gegenwart: Personteil. Vol. 11. Bärenreiter. pp. 1188–89.
- Jackson, Barbara Garvey (1991). Pendle, Karin (ed.). Women and Music: A History. Bloomington: Indiana University Press. pp. 54–94. ISBN 978-0-253-34321-5. JSTOR j.ctt16gz6w7.
- Neuls-Bates, Carol, ed. (1996). Women in Music. Boston: Northeastern University Press. ISBN 978-1-55553-240-6.
- Pendle, Karin (1987). Briscoe, James (ed.). Historical Anthology of Music by Women. Bloomington: Indiana University Press. pp. 88–89. ISBN 978-0-253-05574-3.
- Pohl, Carl Ferdinand (1871). Denkschrift aus Anlass des hundert-jährigen Bestehens der Tonkünstler-societät, im Jahre 1862 reorganisirt als "Haydn", Witwen und Waisen-Versorgungs-Verein der Tonkünstler in Wien. Vienna: Selbstverlag des "Haydn" Collection. OCLC 29131722.
