= Partenza =

Partenza may refer to:

- Partenza, a novel by Achille Essebac
- "La Partenza", a canzonetta by Pietro Metastasio
- Partenza (EP), an EP by Buono!
- "La partenza", a canzonetta from Soirées musicales (Rossini)
