= Gioas (Mayr) =

Musical composition

Innalzamento al trono del giovane re Gioas is an oratorio by Simon Mayr premiered in Florence in 1823. The anonymous libretto is unrelated to the two dozen other oratorios of the name Gioas, all of them based on the 1735 libretto Gioas re di Giuda by Metastasio.

Musically the oratorio is a reworking of Mayr's own opera I misteri eleusini (La Scala, 1802), an opera loosely based on the Eleusinian Mysteries, which Stendhal had praised as one of the strongest operas of the age. Mayr's opera had come to Florence in 1806, and it was for the Florentine Confraternita degli Scolopi or Piarists that Mayr reworked it as an oratorio in 1823.

== Recording ==
- Gioas - Cornel Frey (tenor), Andrea Lauren Brown (soprano), Andreas Burkhart (bass), Robert Sellier (tenor). Bavarian State Opera Chorus, Simon Mayr Choir, Simon Mayr Ensemble, Franz Hauk 2CD Naxos
