= Rosa Taddei =

Italian actress and poet (1799–1869)

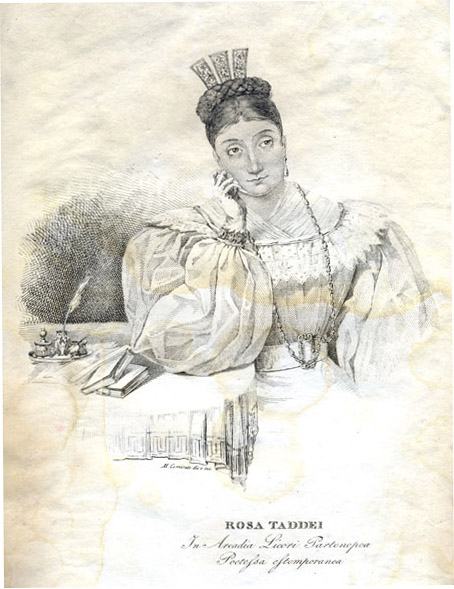
- Taddei at the Carnival of Venice, 1832
- Born: August 30, 1799; Possibly Trento, Corato, or Naples, Italy
- Died: March 3, 1869 (aged 69); Rome, Italy
- Other names: Rosa Mozzidolfi; Licori Partenopea
- Known for: actress; improvisational poet
- Spouse: Vincenzo Mozzidolfi (m. 1832)

Rosa Taddei (August 30, 1799 – March 3, 1869) was an Italian actress and poet, celebrated as one of the foremost improvisatrici of the nineteenth century. She was also known by her married name Rosa Mozzidolfi and wrote under the pastoral pen name Licori Partenopea as a member of the Academy of the Arcadians.

== Early life and family ==
Although Taddei considered herself a Neapolitan, her birthplace has been reported variously as Naples, Trento, and Corato in Apulia. She was born into a prominent theatrical family. Her father, Francesco ("Ciccio") Taddei (1770–1830), led a successful comic troupe for thirty years and was a well-known figure in Italian theatre. Her mother, Maddalena (d. 1830), was also an actress, and her brother Luigi Taddei (1802–1866) became one of the most famous actors of his generation, as well as a painter and poet.

== Career ==
=== Acting ===
Taddei made her mark on stage at approximately age 17 and went on to be regarded as one of the most beautiful and talented tragic actresses in Italy. She came from a tradition of Italian family troupes in which all members contributed to the company's repertoire, and her early immersion in theatrical life shaped her commanding stage presence.

=== Improvisational poetry ===
Taddei was best known, however, for her skill as an improvisatrice — a composer of extemporaneous poetry. This demanding art form required the ability to improvise, with ease and fluency, poetic works of at times considerable scope, on subjects proposed by members of the audience on the spot. The genre was especially popular in Italy during the eighteenth century and the first half of the nineteenth century, and several of its practitioners achieved continental fame, performing in theatres, academies, courts, and salons across Europe.

Taddei was among the most celebrated of these performers. She was admitted as a distinguished member of the Accademia degli Arcadi in Rome, receiving the Arcadian name Licori Partenopea — a classicizing pseudonym evoking the ancient Greek name for Naples (Parthenope), reflecting her Neapolitan identity. She was also a member of the Accademia Spoletina of Spoleto.

In 1832, she performed at various academies in Venice during the carnival season; a record of this is preserved in the frontispiece illustration associated with her work Arcadia Parthenopean Liquors.

== Personal life ==
In 1832, Taddei married Vincenzo Mozzidolfi, described as an educated man well-versed in foreign languages. The couple settled in Rome, where she spent the remainder of her life. She mentored Teresa Gnoli and her brother Domenico Gnoli.

== Death ==
Rosa Taddei died in Rome on March 3, 1869.

== Legacy ==
Taddei is noted in the Enciclopedia Biografica e Bibliografica Italiana (1941) in its series on poets and women writers, and in the Dizionario Enciclopedico Italiano (1961). Her life and work are documented in the University of Chicago Italian Women Writers project.
