= I disingannati =

Comic opera

I disingannati (The Undeceived) is a comic opera in three acts composed by Antonio Caldara to an Italian libretto by Giovanni Claudio Pasquini based on Molière's play Le Misanthrope. It premiered on 8 February 1729 at the court theater in Vienna.

Amongst its revivals in modern times was the 1993 production at the Innsbruck Festival of Early Music conducted by Sigiswald Kuijken.
