= Johann Georg Reutter =

Austrian composer (1708–1772)

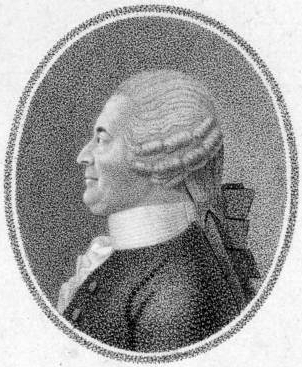
Georg Reutter

Johann Adam Joseph Karl Georg Reutter, during his life known as Georg Reutter the Younger (6 April 1708 – 11 March 1772) was an Austrian composer. According to David Wyn Jones, in his prime he was "the single most influential musician in Vienna".

== Early life ==
Reutter was born and died in Vienna. His father Georg Reutter (the Elder) was also a notable composer. He was the 11th of 14 children and received his early musical training from his father, assisting him as court organist.

A period of more formal instruction from Antonio Caldara ensued, leading to the composition of an oratorio in 1726 and, in 1727, his first opera for the imperial court, Archidamia. On three separate occasions during this period, Reutter applied for a position as court organist and was each time rejected by Johann Joseph Fux. At his own expense he travelled to Italy in 1730 (possibly in 1729); in February 1730 he was in Venice and in April 1730 in Rome. He returned to Vienna in autumn 1730, and early in the following year he successfully applied for a post as court composer, the formal beginning of a lifetime of service at the Habsburg court. After his father's death he became Kapellmeister of St. Stephen's Cathedral in 1738.

== As Kapellmeister ==
The Kapellmeister position had existed since the fifteenth century and Reutter was the 27th to occupy the post. The job provided living space directly adjacent to the cathedral, the Kapellhaus (demolished in 1803), which also housed Reutter's family and the choirboys.

Reutter supervised a staff of 31 musicians, as follows:

- 5 choirboys, who sang the treble (soprano) part
- 12 adult male singers: basses, tenors, and countertenors. The latter sang the alto part.
- 12 string players
- an organist
- a subcantor, who assisted Reutter

When trumpets, timpani, or trombones were needed, they were recruited on an ad hoc basis, often borrowed from the musical establishment of the imperial court (Hofkapelle).

According to Jones, the repertoire of church music "constituted a continually unfolding tradition that is poorly served by the familiar division of the [18th] century into Baroque and Classical." Much of this repertoire was by Reutter himself (see Works, below); other composers prominently represented were Bonno, Tuma, and Fux.

== Reutter and Haydn ==
In 1739, while visiting the town of Hainburg, Reutter auditioned the seven-year-old Joseph Haydn; Haydn joined his ensemble the following year, later to be joined by his younger brother Michael. Both served until they were teenagers and had lost their soprano voices.

It was naturally assumed that the youngsters were likely to become professional musicians in adulthood and they were trained accordingly. Joseph Haydn was given singing lessons by the tenor Ignaz Finsterbusch and taught violin by the ensemble's bass player, Adam Gegenbauer. He was also taught keyboard. The training did not include serious instruction in musical theory; this was a thirst that Joseph was able to satisfy (by studying Fux and Mattheson) only after he had left the Kapelle.

The choirboys were also given a basic ordinary education, including reading, writing, arithmetic, and some Latin. Jones suggests that "Haydn's formal education was rather patchy, perhaps less regular than it had been in [his previous home in] Hainburg."

The memoirs dictated by Joseph to biographers in his old age indicate that Reutter's choristers often were underfed, thanks to Reutter's reluctance to spend money on them. Reutter was also not particularly helpful in providing feedback on Haydn's earliest efforts at musical composition.

== Later career ==
Reutter later advanced to the position of court Kapellmeister, and Empress Maria Theresa gave him the sole management of the court orchestra in 1751. Reutter died in Vienna.

== Music ==
In addition to the works mentioned above, Reutter wrote a great deal of church music. Jones lists the following:

- about 80 masses
- 6 requiems
- 17 graduals
- 31 offertories
- 126 motets
- 151 psalm settings
- 53 hymns
- 48 antiphons
- 7 responses
- 20 litanies

Reutter is believed to be the author of a setting of the De profundis, KV 93, formerly ascribed to Wolfgang Amadeus Mozart.

=== Oratorios ===
The following oratorios are mentioned in Eitner's Quellen-Lexicon:

- La morte d'Abele (1727) Metastasio
- Elia (1728) Leopoldo de Villati, 24 February
- Bersabea, ovvero il pentimento di David (1729) text by Giovanni Battista Catena
- La Divina provvidenza in Ismael (1732) Antonio Maria Lucchini
- Il ritorno di Tobia (1733) text by Giovanni Claudio Pasquini, 5 March 1733
- La Betulia liberata (1734) text by Metastasio
- Gioas re di Giuda (1735) (Joash, King of Judah) text by Metastasio
- La Maria lebbrosa (1739)

=== Stage works ===
The following stage works are listed in Eitner's Quellen-Lexicon:

- Archidamia (1727)
- Dialogo tra la inclinazione ed il bene (1728)
- Dialogo tra Minerva ed Apollo (1728)
- La forza dell'amicizia ovvero Pilade ed Oreste (1728)
- Alcide transformato in Dio (1729)
- La Magnanimita di Alessandro (1729)
- Plotina (1730)
- La generosita di Artaserse con Temistocle (1731)
- La Pacienza do Socrate (1731)
- Il tempo e la verita (1731)
- Alessandro il grande (1732)
- Zenobia (1732)
- Ciro in Armenia (1733)
- Dafne (1734)
- La Gratitudine di Mitridate (1734)
- Mitridate e di Ponto (1734)
- Il Palladio conservato (1735)
- Il sacrifizio in Aulide (1735)
- Diana vendicta (1736)
- La speranza assicurata (1736)
- L'alloro illustrata (1738)
- Il parnasso accusato e difeso (1738)
- L'Eroina d'Argo (1739)
- Amor prigioniero (1741)
- La Corona (1754)
- La Gara (1755)
- Il sogno (1756 or 1757)

== Selected recordings ==
- Mozart/Reutter: De profundis clamavi, Choir and Orchestra of the Vienna Volksoper, Peter Maag
- Johann Georg Reutter: Portus Felicitatis – Motetten und Arien für das Pantaleon, Monika Mauch, Stanislava Jirku, La Gioia Armonica, Jürgen Banholzer. Ramee 2013
- Johann Georg Reutter: Arie & Sinfonie, Olivia Vermeulen, Nuovo Aspetto. Accent 2013
