= Georg Reutter =

Georg Reutter (3 November 1656 – 29 August 1738) was an Austrian organist, theorbo player, and composer.

== Biography ==
Georg Reutter was born in Vienna and became a pupil of Johann Caspar Kerll, whom he later succeeded as organist at St. Stephen's Cathedral, Vienna, in 1686. In 1695 he spent some time in Italy. He was ennobled in Rome on 8 January 1695 by Prince Sforza; unlike his son, he did not use his title. Between 1696 and 1703 Reutter was employed in the Viennese court chapel as continuo player on the theorbo. The principal Kapellmeister, Antonio Draghi, recommended him to the emperor as ‘a virtuoso player able to play many instruments’. He was married three times and was the father of 15 children, of whom two became musicians (Karl and the younger Georg). In 1700 Reutter was formally appointed court organist. In 1712 he succeeded Fux as vice-Kapellmeister and in 1715 as first Kapellmeister of the cathedral; he retained that position until 1728. He passed on the position of cathedral organist to his son Georg Reutter II in 1720. He died in Vienna.

As a composer Reutter is best known for his collection of toccatas. He also composed a large number of so-called Versetteln or short organ preludes.
