= Nicolo Martines =

Papal nuncio in Wien

Nicolo Martines was Maestro di Camera (major-domo) at the papal nuncio in Wien, the Pope's embassy to the Austrian Empire.

== Life ==
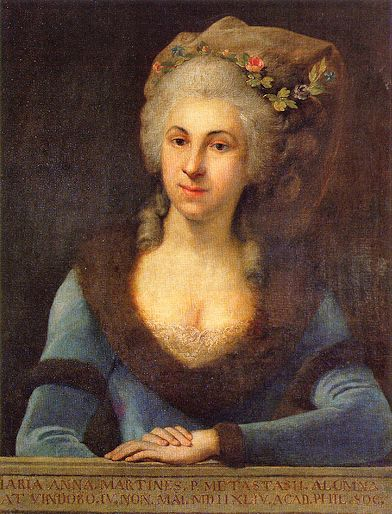
Portrait of Marianna Martines by Anton von Maron, dated by Lorenz ca. 1773

Nicolo Martines's father was a Spanish soldier who had settled in Naples in the late 17th century. He grew up there and for a time pursued a career as a soldier. In the early 1730s he became Maestro di Camera of the papal nuncio at the Habsburg court.

For service to the Empire, Nicolo's sons in 1774 acquired a patent of nobility, hence the "von" in the family surname.

== Pietro Metastasio ==
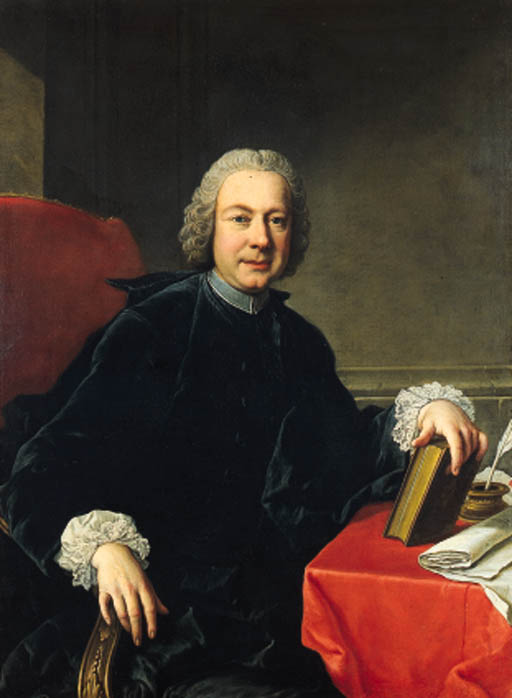
Portrait of Italian poet Pietro Metastasio (1698-1782), attributed to Pompeo Batoni (1708–1787)

Pietro Metastasio was an Italian poet and librettist, considered the most important writer of opera seria libretti. At the age of thirty-two, he was appointed court poet to Emperor Charles VI of Vienna. There he met his lifelong friend and companion Nicolo Martines.

Metastasio was the landlord of the Martines family for the entire rest of his life (from about 1734 to 1782). His presence would prove crucial to Nicolo's daughter, Marianne's career. Marianna Martines was an Austrian singer, pianist and composer of the classical period.

The Martines family lived in rooms in a large building on the Michaelerplatz, "a stately building still standing in the Kohlmarkt."
