= Teresa Gnoli =

Italian poet (1833–1886)

Countess Teresa Gnoli
- Born: 23 August 1833; Rome, Papal States
- Died: 14 November 1886 (aged 53); Rome, Italy
- Occupation: Poet

Teresa Gnoli Gualandi (née Gnoli; /ˈnjoʊli/; NYOH-lee; 23 August 1833 – 14 November 1886) was an Italian poet, noblewoman, and educator. Born into a cultured Roman family during the final years of the Papal States, she displayed a precocious gift for verse from childhood. Her first poems were published when she was ten years old.

As a young woman, she wrote patriotic hymns in support of the Risorgimento during the upheavals of 1848–1849, before the political and personal losses of the following decade drew her toward Classicism and, eventually, devotional verse. She joined the Academy of the Arcadians and the Tiberian Academy, writing under the pastoral pen name of Irminda Aonia.

At the invitation of Pope Leo XIII, she turned to educational and charitable work in her later years, directing a girls' school in Rome and helping to establish an institute for the deaf. Her younger brother Domenico Gnoli and sister Elena Gnoli also became noted poets.

== Early life ==
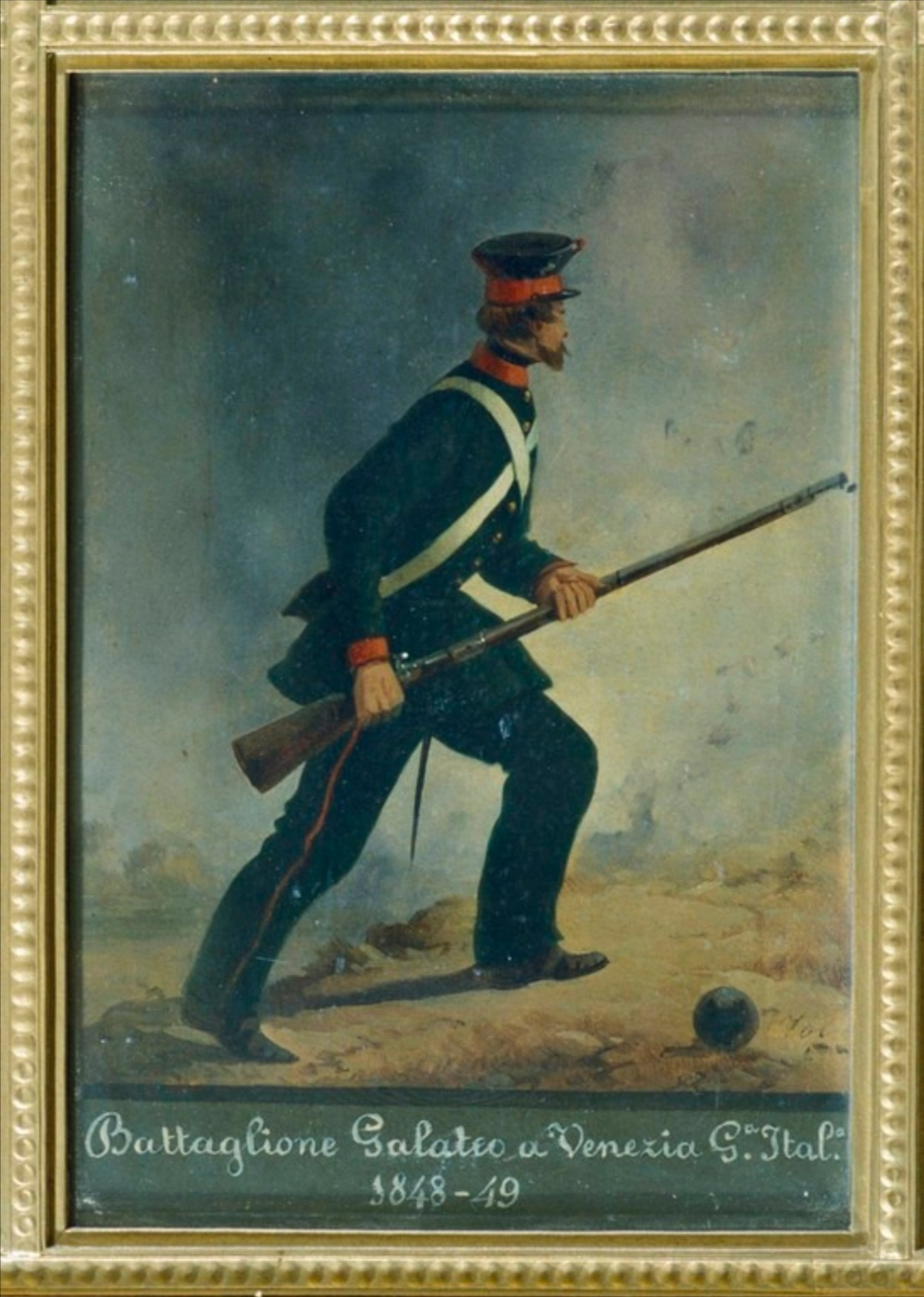
Volunteer soldier during the First Italian War of Independence (1848)

Gnoli was born in Rome, then capital of the Papal States, to a family of the Italian nobility on 23 August 1833. Her father was Count Tommaso Gnoli, a lawyer for the Papal consistory, who had seven children with Maddalena, née Dini. The household was an intellectually lively one: the Roman dialect poet Giuseppe Gioachino Belli was a close friend of her father's, and regularly visited the Gnoli residence to dine and recite his sonnets. Teresa's father also entrusted the education of his daughters Teresa and Elena to the poet Rosa Taddei, who was celebrated in Rome for her improvised verse at public events such as the Carnival of Venice.

Her younger brother Domenico Gnoli, who later wrote a biography of his elder sister, recorded that at the age of seven she was already capable of writing sweet, musical verse in the manner of Pietro Metastasio, and produced complete poems by the age of ten. Her younger sister Elena Gnoli also became a poet. Two lyrics by the young Teresa, Alla rosa (To the rose) and La vera patria (The true homeland), were published by Orresti Raggi in 1844, when she was ten years old. Some of her poems were also published in celebration of the amnesty that Pope Pius IX granted to political prisoners in the Papal States following his election in 1846, when Teresa was just twelve years old.

== Literary career ==
=== Roman Republic ===
Much of Gnoli's early work was shaped by the turbulent events of the Risorgimento. The assassination of Pellegrino Rossi, the papal prime minister, in November 1848, prompted Pope Pius IX to flee to Gaeta, leaving Rome in the hands of republican patriots. As Giuseppe Garibaldi passed through Rieti gathering volunteers, many young Romans joined his cause, and Teresa responded to the moment with her patriotic hymn Siam tutti fratelli! (We are all brothers!), composed in February 1849 and published with the subtitle "offered to the city militias and volunteers of Rome before their departure." The work was strongly influenced by Il Canto degli Italiani, the popular anthem among liberal revolutionaries composed by Michele Novaro to words by Goffredo Mameli, and Gnoli's verse was explicitly intended to be sung to the same tune.

Her father, anxious to avoid being compelled to swear allegiance to the short-lived Roman Republic (1849–1850), moved the family to Montepulciano in Tuscany on 16 May 1849, where they stayed with his wife's relatives for three months. The pastoral landscapes of the Tuscan countryside made a lasting impression on Gnoli, awakening an interest in bucolic poetry that would shape her later work and her eventual affiliation with the Academy of the Arcadians.

=== Early years of the Restoration ===
Following the collapse of the Roman Republic and the death of her mother in 1850, the family returned to Rome. Teresa, along with her siblings Domenico and Elena, was welcomed into both the Academy of the Arcadians and the Tiberian Academy, two literary societies devoted to the composition and recitation of verse. She participated in their weekly meetings and presented her poems under the pastoral pen name Irminda Aonia. Around this time her "quick and fresh" verse began appearing in pamphlets for weddings and social occasions throughout Lazio.

In 1856, she composed a series of poems to mark the occasion of her cousin Vincenza Tarugi taking religious vows to become a nun. Her father and siblings Elena and Tommaso each contributed verse to the occasion, and their work was published as a single volume. The collection was written in loose verse in the manner of Giacomo Leopardi, though Teresa's contributions were noted for an originality and clarity of expression that anticipated the more mature work of her later years.

=== Roman School period ===
Exposed to a wide circle of contemporary writers in Rome, Gnoli gravitated toward the Poets of the Roman School, a group that repudiated Romanticism and sought a return to the perceived purity of Classicism. In this period she produced some of her most celebrated works, including L'incontro di Beatrice e Laura (The Meeting of Beatrice and Laura), Teresa La notte (Teresa the Night), Il pellegrino e la speranza (The Pilgrim and Hope), and Una madre indiana (An Indian Mother).

An important patron during these years was the poet and Duke Giovanni Torlonia (1831–1858), who in 1856 addressed an ode to Teresa and invited her to study German philosophy with him. He actively promoted her work among his circle of Roman intellectuals and included her poems in two anthologies he edited: I fiori della Campagna romana (Flowers of the Roman countryside) in 1857 and Strenna Romana (Roman Strenua) in 1858. During this period she also became a close friend and confidant of the poet Giannina Milli (1825–1888), a celebrated improviser of verse who toured the Italian peninsula to wide acclaim. When the remains of the Renaissance poet Torquato Tasso were transferred to the church of Sant'Onofrio in Rome, Gnoli composed verse for the occasion, and she also wrote a lyrical drama that was set to music by the Roman composer Giuseppe Branzoli.

This productive period was shadowed by personal loss. Her sister Elena died on 15 November 1857 after a prolonged illness, and the following year Torlonia also died. Struck by grief and despondency, Gnoli sought to enter religious life, but was dissuaded by her father.

=== Later life ===
In 1863, Gnoli married Giovanni Gualandi, a physician who had managed the Jesuit journal La Civiltà Cattolica and served as director of an asylum for the mentally ill in Rome. The following year the couple relocated to Frascati, where Gualandi sought to establish a psychiatric hospital. When the venture proved unsuccessful, they returned to Rome in 1870, and Gualandi became secretary of the Merode Institute at the Palazzo Altemps (now the Museo Nazionale Romano).

Her poetry in this period took on a more devotional and moralistic character, as in La preghiera del sordomuto (The prayer of the deaf-mute, 1872). She and her husband also became deeply involved in the education of deaf and mute children, inspired by the work begun in Bologna in 1849 by Gualandi's brothers. In 1884, their Rome residence became the local branch of the Gualandi Institute for the Deaf.

In 1879, Pope Leo XIII invited Gnoli to found a girls' school dedicated to Catherine of Alexandria. She served as its director until her death, teaching Italian literature and history.

Gnoli died in Rome on 14 November 1886, aged 53. Her great grandnephew was the Italian painter Domenico Gnoli (painter) (1933–1970). A street in Rome was named Via Teresa Gnoli in her honor.

== Poetry ==
La Notte (1844)

La mia dimora bruna
Sorgeva in mezzo ai campi: io la rammento.
Al raggio della luna,
Quando taceva il vento;
L'acque parean d'argento,
Biancheggiavan confusi a noi dinante
I sentieri e le piante!

The Night (1844)

My brown and humble dwelling
Rose in the midst of fields: I still remember.
Beneath the moonlight's swelling,
When winds would cease their tremor;
The waters shone like silver,
And there before us, pale and undefined,
The paths and trees entwined!
