= Sebben, crudele =

Aria composed by Antonio Caldara

"Sebben, crudele" is an aria from Antonio Caldara's 1710 opera, La costanza in amor vince l'inganno (Faithfulness in love conquers treachery). It comes from the third scene of the opera's first act, and is sung by the character Aminta after his lover, Siliva, has become inexplicably cruel and unresponsive.

Although the opera itself has been rarely performed in modern times, Sebben, crudele remains a popular concert aria. It has been recorded by Cecilia Bartoli, Beniamino Gigli and Janet Baker, amongst others.

== Text ==
Italian

Sebben, crudele,
mi fai languir,
sempre fedele
ti voglio amar.
Con la lunghezza
del mio servir
la tua fierezza
saprò stancar.

Translation in English

Although, cruel one,
me you make languish,
always faithful
you I want to love.
With the length
of my servitude
your pride,
I will know how to wear down.

== Bibliography ==
- Anthology of Italian Song of the Seventeenth and Eighteenth Centuries - Selected and edited with biographical notes by Alessandro Parisotti, G. Schirmer, 1926
