= La clemenza di Tito (Caldara) =

La clemenza di Tito is a 1734 opera by Antonio Caldara, the original setting of the libretto by Metastasio.

== Roles ==
Role	Voice Type
Sesto, a young patrician, friend of Tito, in love with Vitellia	Soprano Castrato
Annio, a young patrician, friend of Sesto, in love with Servilia	Soprano Castrato
Tito Vespasian, Roman Emperor	Soprano Castrato
Vitellia, daughter of the deposed Emperor Vitellio	Soprano
Servilia, sister of Sesto	Soprano
Publio, Praetorian prefect, commander of the Praetorian Guard	Bass

== Recordings ==
- Sergio Balestracci, Bongiovanni Musica, 2004
