= Missa Liberae dispositionis =

- Mass by Antonio Caldara
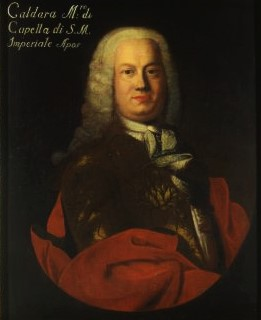
- Antonio Caldara, 18th-century portrait
- Key: B-flat major
- Text: Mass ordinary
- Language: Latin
- Composed: 1734
- Scoring: SATB soloists and choir; strings; continuo

Missa Liberae dispositionis (Mass for free disposition) is a mass in B-flat major by Antonio Caldara for four voices, strings and basso continuo. It has no Credo. The work was published in 19th-century collection of sacred music.

== History ==
The Baroque composer Antonio Caldara, born in Venice, was from 1716 until his death vice chapel master at the Vienna court of Charles VI, where he was a prolific composer of operas and church music. He composed the mass in B-flat major there in 1734. The mass is scored for soprano, alto, tenor and bass soloists and a four-part choir, strings and basso continuo. It has no Credo.

The title page bears no title; it was named Missa Liberae dispositionis when it was included in a 19th-century collection of masses and other sacred pieces by different composers. The title indicates that it is free to be used anytime within the liturgical year. Another name used for the work is Missa S. Josephi.
