= Gioas re di Giuda =

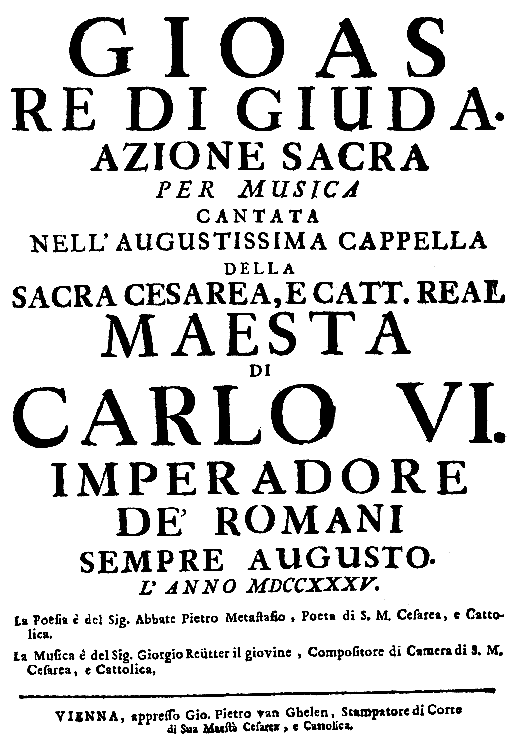

Gioas re di Giuda (Joas, king of Judah) is an Italian-language oratorio libretto by Pietro Metastasio written in 1735 for imperial court composer Georg Reutter the younger and later set by at least 25 composers. The plot is based on the life of King Joash of Judah.

== Settings ==
- Johann Georg Reutter, 1735, Hofburgkapelle, Vienna
- Vaclav Matyas Guretzky, 1736, Brünn
- Giuseppe Maria Orlandini, 1744, Pistoia
- Niccolò Jommelli, 1745, Ospedale degl’Incurabili, Venice
- Gennaro Manna, 1747, Naples
- Georg Christoph Wagenseil, 1755, Burgtheater, Vienna
- Antonio Sacchini, 1767, Oratorio dei Filippini di Santa Maria in Vallicella, Rome
- Luigi Boccherini, 1770, S. Maria di Corteorlandini, Lucca
- J. C. Bach, 22 March 1770, King's Theatre, Haymarket, London
- Antonio Cartellieri, 29 March 1795, Vienna
- Joseph Schuster, 1803, Dresden
- Luigi Mosca, 1806, Palermo

The 1823 setting of an anonymous libretto by Simone Mayr, Innalzamento al trono del giovane re Gioas, is only thematically based on Metastasio's original.
