= Tommaso Sgricci =

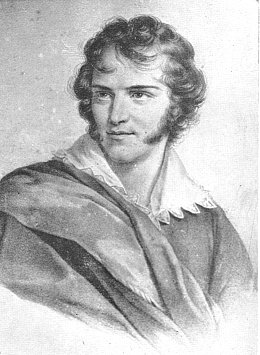
- Engraving after the 1824 portrait by Baron François Gérard.
- Born: 31 October 1789; Castiglion Fiorentino, Arezzo (Grand Duchy of Tuscany)
- Died: 23 July 1836 (aged 46); Arezzo (Grand Duchy of Tuscany)
- Resting place: Santa Croce, Florence
- Education: University of Pisa
- Notable work: Idomeneo, La caduta di Missolungi, Crispo, Tieste, Sansone
- Patrons: Leopold II, Grand Duke of Tuscany

Tommaso Sgricci (31 October 1789 – 23 July 1836) was an Italian poet and actor, hugely admired in his time for his talent in improvisation.

== Biography ==
Tommaso Sgricci was born in Castiglion Fiorentino, Arezzo (Grand Duchy of Tuscany) into a modest family, from Jacopo, a physician, and the Florentine Assunta Lorenzi. On 6 June 1810, he graduated in law in Pisa.

Tommaso Sgricci was one of the last heirs to the tradition of Italian improvvisatori. He practiced improvisation from an early age, and in 1813, he began a life of touring throughout Italy and even abroad. He knew how to create spontaneous poetry by using the Italian poetic language of prefabricated sentences, and to interpret it spectacularly on stage, declaiming so quickly that his audience can not evaluate the quality of the verse (thus receiving criticism from famous writers of the time, such as Pietro Giordani, a dear friend of Giacomo Leopardi). His good looks, despite a slight lameness, and innate stage presence favored his success as much as his celebrated memory and fantasy.

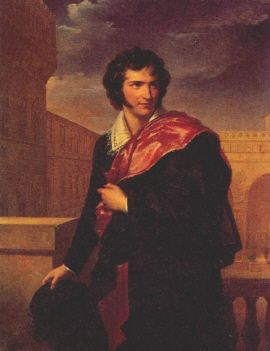
Tommaso Sgricci, by François Gérard (1824). Museo Civico d'Arte, Modena.

Successfully filling entire theaters, he received delirious welcomes. During these shows, he usually invited the audience to write topics on tickets: after having shot one, he composed an entire piece in verse (but not in rhymes) and recited all the roles. During a visit to Paris in 1824, he performed in front of a chosen society and successfully improvised tragedies in five acts on the themes of Bianca Cappello and the execution of Charles I of England. In 1825, in front of the Grand Duke of Tuscany, he improvised a tragedy on the death of Mary, Queen of Scots and succeeded so well that the enthusiastic Grand Duke assured him a pension of 2400 livres. In the same year, he was ascribed to the nobility of Arezzo.

His success allowed him not to hide his homosexuality, and he created around him an atmosphere of accursed scandal that fascinated the public. Lord Byron, who met him in Ravenna, wrote on 3 March 1820:

Sgricci is here improvisating away with great success – he is also a celebrated Sodomite, a character by no means so much respected in Italy as it should be; but they laugh instead of burning – and the Women talk of it as a pity in a man of talent.

The greatest scandal happened in 1819 when, at the height of his glory, he came to Rome to be crowned poet on the Capitoline Hill, but he was expelled from the Papal States a few days before this great honor. The official explanation was that he would have criticized the Pope's government, but the rumour of a homosexual scandal spread, as the poet Count Giovanni Giraud wrote:

Batillo, il tragico / dai falsi allori / stuprando Apolline / a posteriori, / le inimitabili / Sacre Eminenze / lo rincularono / sino a Firenze.
Bathyllus the fakely laureate / playwright / violated Apollo / from behind, / the incomparable / Holy Eminences / sent him back / to Florence.

Nevertheless, he continued to perform with great success in Paris, London and Naples. As his career declined, he returned to Florence in 1826 where the protection of the Grand Duke guaranteed him impunity despite police surveillance. He died on 23 July 1836 in Florence and was buried in the Basilica of Santa Croce.

== Bibliography ==
- Aldrich, Robert; Wotherspoon, Garry, eds. (2002). Who's Who in Gay & Lesbian History. London – New York: Routledge. pp. 476–477. ISBN 0415159830.
- Giordani, Pietro (1961) [1816]. "Dello Sgricci e degl'improvvisatori in Italia". Scritti (in Italian). Florence: Sansoni. pp. 133–142.
- Pocci, Carlo (15 July 1943). "Sgricci Tommaso, cenni critico-biografici". Rivista italiana del teatro (in Italian): 84–88.
- Viviani, Ugo (1928). Un genio aretino: Tommaso Sgricci, poeta tragico e improvvisatore (in Italian). Arezzo: Scuola Tipografica Aretina.
