= Domenico Gnoli (painter) =

Italian painter and stage designer (1933–1970)

- Born: 3 May 1933; Rome, Italy
- Died: 17 April 1970 (aged 36)
- Known for: Painting; Stage design

Domenico Gnoli (3 May 1933 – 17 April 1970) was an Italian painter and stage designer, born in Rome. He studied stage design at the Accademia di Belle Arti, and began a short stint designing stages, for which he was well received. Following this, he spent the better part of his life in New York City, working for magazines such as Sports Illustrated, and Fortune, where he found favour with art director Leo Lionni. He is known most for his work "Orestes or The Art of Smiling".

== Biography ==
Son of ceramicist Annie de Garrou (1900–1994) and Umberto Gnoli, who was an art historian and superintendent of arts in Umbria, Domenico Gnoli was born in Rome in 1933. His sister Marzia was born the following year. Gnoli's paternal grandfather was the poet and historian of the same name – Domenico Gnoli. His great-aunts were also poets, Teresa Gnoli and Elena Gnoli. His paternal uncle, Tommaso (1874–1958) was a literary critic and expert on German culture.

The cultural influence of his family created in Gnoli, as he grew up, a passion for drawing and painting. Illustrating this, his father sent him a letter, when Gnoli was just 10 years old, that contained architectural lessons. Gnoli spent his first years in Rome and Spoleto.

He made a series of surrealist drawings, one of which – depicting a sea creature in a snail's shell on a couch – is often confused with Edward Gorey's work.

Because of his death at the age of 36 from cancer, there are very few mature works by him held in public collections. The vast majority of his major works are held by private collectors in Italy. One estimate places the number of mature paintings at only 140.

== Sources ==
- artnet.com: Resource Library: Gnoli, Domenico (ii) artnet.com, (reproduced from The Grove Dictionary of Art (Macmillan Publishers Limited, 2000.) (Retrieved 2 March 2011.)
- ULAN Full Record Display (Getty Research) J. Paul Getty Trust. (Retrieved 2 March 2011.)
- Domenico Gnoli, the Alphabet of Illustrators Chris Mullen. (Retrieved 2 March 2011.) (Retrieved 2 March 2011.)
