= La Partenza =

1749 canzonetta by poet Pietro Metastasio

"La partenza" is a 1749 canzonetta by Pietro Metastasio (1698-1782). It is among his most famous canzonettas and after being set by the poet himself was set again by many composers including Farinelli, Caffarelli, Giovanni Paisiello, Mozart, Beethoven himself and Beethoven's pupil Archduke Rudolph.

The first stanza goes:

Ecco quel fiero istante:
Nice, mia Nice, addio.
Come vivrò ben mio,
Così lontan da te?

== Settings ==
- Pietro Metastasio
- Farinelli
- Caffarelli
- Giovanni Paisiello
- Mozart as "Ecco quel fiero istante", K. 436
- Beethoven, as WoO. 124
- Carl Blum
- Friedrich August Bungert 1884
- Johann Wilhelm Hertel
- Friedrich Wilhelm Rust as "La Partenza di Nice", 1784
- Rossini
- Bortniansky
