= Antonio Caldara =

Italian composer (c.1670–1736)

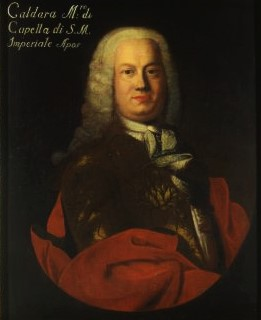
- Born: c. 1670; Venice
- Died: 28 December 1736; Vienna
- Occupation: Composer

Antonio Caldara (c. 1670 – 28 December 1736) was an Italian Baroque composer.

== Life ==
Caldara was born in Venice (exact date unknown), the son of a violinist. He became a chorister at St Mark's in Venice, where he learned several instruments, probably under the instruction of Giovanni Legrenzi. In 1699 he relocated to Mantua, where he became maestro di cappella to the inept Charles IV, Duke of Mantua, a pensionary of France with a French wife, who took the French side in the War of the Spanish Succession. Caldara removed from Mantua in 1707, after the French were expelled from Italy, then moved on to Barcelona as chamber composer to Charles III, the pretender to the Spanish throne (following the death of Charles II of Spain in 1700 without any direct heir) and who kept a royal court at Barcelona. There, he wrote some operas that are the first Italian operas performed in Spain. He moved on to Rome, becoming maestro di cappella to Francesco Maria Marescotti Ruspoli, 1st Prince of Cerveteri. While there he wrote in 1710 La costanza in amor vince l'inganno (Faithfulness in Love Defeats Treachery) for the public theatre at Macerata.

With the unexpected death of Emperor Joseph I from smallpox at the age of 32 in April 1711, Caldara deemed it prudent to renew his connections with Charles III – soon to become Holy Roman Emperor Charles VI – as he travelled from Spain to Vienna via northern Italy. Caldara visited Vienna in 1712, but found Marc'Antonio Ziani and Johann Joseph Fux firmly ensconced in the two highest musical posts. He stopped at the Salzburg court on his return journey to Rome, where he was well received (and to which he subsequently sent one new opera annually from 1716 to 1727). In 1716, following the death the previous year of Ziani and the promotion of Fux to Hofkapellmeister, Caldara was appointed Vize-Kapellmeister to the Imperial Court in Vienna, and there he remained until his death.

Caldara composed more than 70 operas, more than 30 oratorios, and other works including motets and sonatas. Several of his compositions have libretti by Pietro Metastasio, the court poet at Vienna from 1729.

== Noted works ==
Operas

- Sofonisba (F. Silvani), Venezia, Teatro San Giovanni Grisostomo/Teatro Malibran, 1708.
- Il più bel nome (P. Pariati), Barcelona, 1708.
- Tito e Berenice (1714)
- Ifigenia in Aulide (Zeno), Vienna, 1718.
- Lucio Papirio dittatore (Zeno), Vienna, 1719.
- I disingannati (Pasquini), Vienna, 1729.
- Adriano in Siria (Metastasio), Vienna, 1732.
- L'Olimpiade (Metastasio), Vienna, 1733.
- La clemenza di Tito (Metastasio), Vienna, 1734
- Achille in Sciro (Metastasio), Vienna, 1736.

Oratorios

- Maddalena ai piedi di Cristo (c. 1700)
- Santo Stefano, primo Re d'Ungheria (1713)
- La Conversione di Clodoveo Re di Francia (1715)
- La passione di Gesù Cristo (1730)
- Il Re del dolore (1722)
- Stabat Mater (c. 1725)

Others

- Il più bel nome, serenata on the occasion of the marriage of Archduke Charles of Austria to Elisabeth Christine of Brunswick-Wolfenbüttel on 2 August 1708
- "Sebben, crudele" (Aria from La costanza in amor vince l'inganno, 1710)
- D'improvviso (cantata)
- "Alma del core" (aria)
- "Selve amiche" (aria)
- Missa Providentiae
- Missa Dolorosa (1735)
- Missa Liberae dispositionis
- La Costanza vince il rigore (cantata)
- Crucifixus
- Come Raggio di Sol
- Christmas Cantata

== Discography ==
- Antonio Caldara, La Concordia De' Pianeti vocals, Carlos Mena, Daniel Behle, Delphine Galou, Franco Fagioli, Luca Tittoto, Ruxandra Donose, Veronica Cangemi Orchestra, La Cetra Barockorchester Basel (Deutsche Grammophon/Archiv Produktion 479 3356, 2014) - Recorded at the Konzerthaus Dortmund, 13 - 19 January 2014 in conjunction with the modern world premiere on 18 January 2014 World-premiere recording
- Antonio Caldara, Sonatas & Cantatas for soprano, violin and continuo - I Solisti Ambrosiani: Tullia Pedersoli soprano, Davide Belosio violin, Claudio Frigerio cello, Mauro Pinciaroli archlute, Emma Bolamperti harpsichord (Urania Records, LDV 14045, 2019) - first world recording
