= Pietro Metastasio =

Italian poet and librettist (1698–1782)

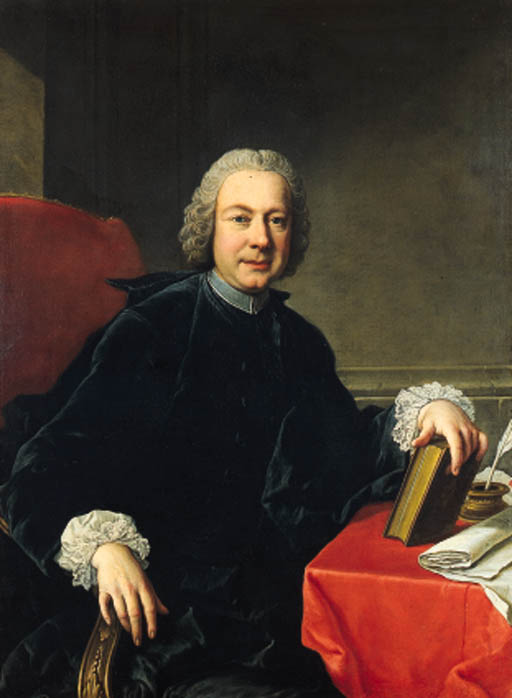
- Metastasio, c. 1770 by Meytens or Batoni
- Born: Pietro Antonio Domenico Trapassi; 3 January 1698; Rome, Papal States
- Died: 12 April 1782 (aged 84); Vienna, Holy Roman Empire
- Occupations: Writer; poet
- Writing career
- Pen name: Pietro Metastasio
- Movement: Rococo

Pietro Antonio Domenico Trapassi (3 January 1698 – 12 April 1782), better known by his pseudonym of Pietro Metastasio (Italian: [ˈpjɛːtro metaˈstaːzjo]), was an Italian poet and librettist, considered the most important writer of opera seria libretti.

== Early life ==
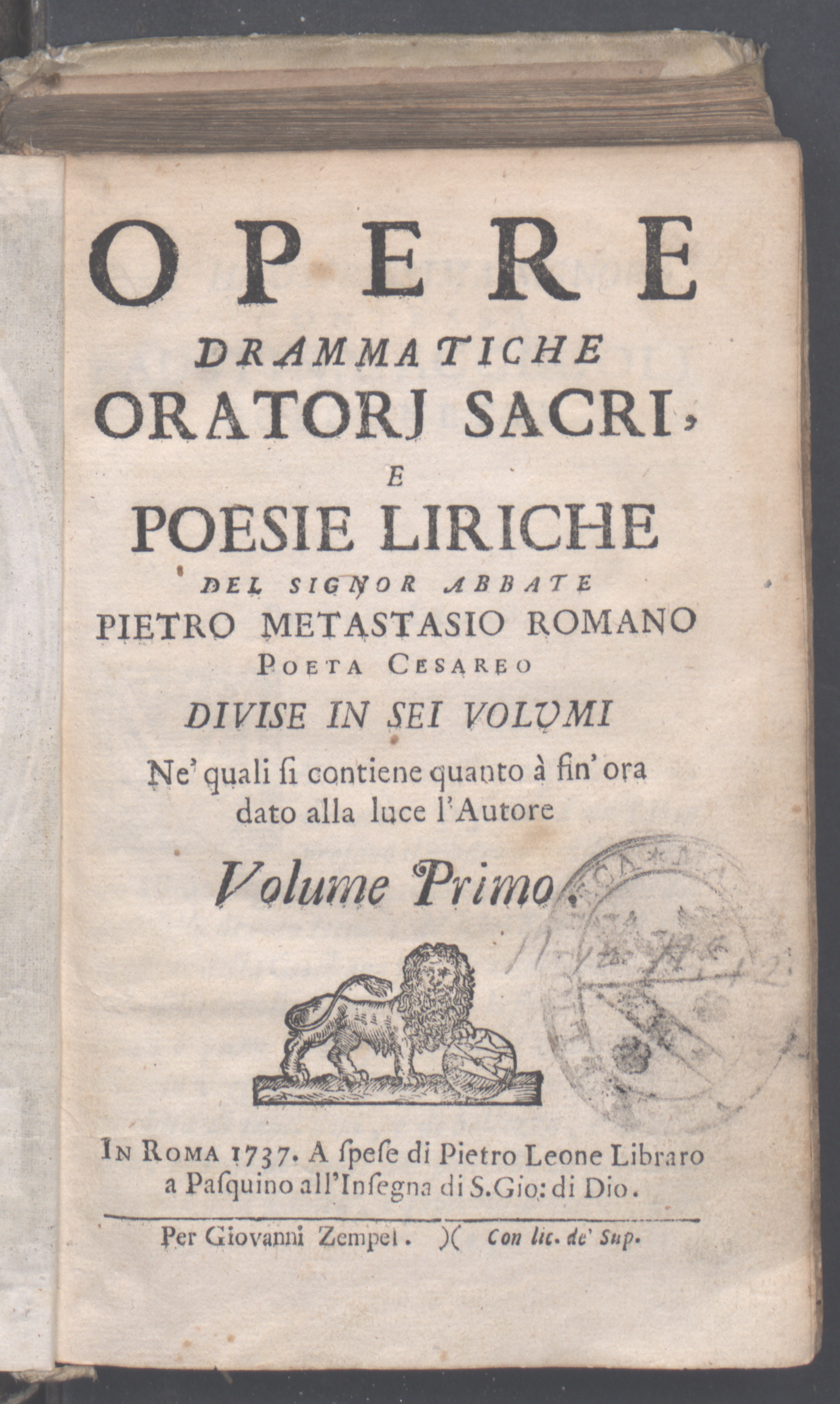
Opere drammatiche, oratorj sacri e poesie liriche (1737)

Metastasio was born in Rome, where his father, Felice Trapassi, a native of Assisi, had taken service in the Corsican regiment of the papal forces. Felice married a Bolognese woman, Francesca Galasti, and became a grocer in the Via dei Cappellari. The couple had two sons and two daughters; Pietro was the younger son.

Pietro, while still a child, is said to have attracted crowds by reciting impromptu verses on a given subject. On one such occasion in 1709, two men of distinction stopped to listen: Giovanni Vincenzo Gravina, famous for legal and literary erudition as well as his directorship of the Arcadian Academy, and Lorenzini, a critic of some note. Gravina was attracted by the boy's poetic talent and personal charm, and made Pietro his protégé; in the course of a few weeks he adopted him. Felice Trapassi was glad to give his son the chance of a good education and introduction into society.

Gravina hellenized the boy's name Trapassi into Metastasio, and intended his adopted son to be a jurist like himself. He therefore made the boy learn Latin and law. At the same time he cultivated his literary gifts, and displayed the youthful prodigy both at his own house and in the Roman coteries. Metastasio soon found himself competing with the most celebrated improvvisatori of his time in Italy. However, his days full of study and evenings devoted to improvising poetry took a toll on Pietro's health.

Gravina, making a business trip to Calabria, exhibited Metastasio in the literary circles of Naples, then placed him in the care of his kinsman Gregorio Caroprese at Scaléa. In country air and the quiet of the southern seashore Metastasio's health revived. Gravina decided that he should never improvise again, but should be reserved for nobler efforts, when, having completed his education, he might enter into competition with the greatest poets.

Metastasio responded to his patron's wishes. At the age of twelve he translated the Iliad into octave stanzas; and two years later he composed a Senecan tragedy on a subject from Gian Giorgio Trissino's Italia liberata – Gravina's favourite epic. It was called Giustino, and was printed in 1713; forty-two years later, Metastasio told his publisher that he would willingly suppress this juvenilia.

Caroprese died in 1714, leaving Gravina his heir; and in 1718 Gravina also died. Metastasio inherited a fortune of 15,000 scudi. At a meeting of the Arcadian Academy, he recited an elegy to his patron, and then settled down to enjoy his wealth.

== Roman fame ==
Metastasio was now twenty. During the last four years he had worn the costume of abbé, having taken the minor orders without which it was then useless to expect advancement in Rome. His romantic history, personal beauty, charming manners and distinguished talents made him fashionable. Within two years he had spent his money and increased his reputation. He decided to apply himself seriously to the work of his profession. He migrated to Naples, and entered the office of an eminent lawyer named Castagnola, who exercised severe control over his time and energies.

While slaving at the law, Metastasio in 1721 composed an epithalamium, and probably also his first musical serenade, Endimione (about Endymion), on the occasion of the marriage of his patroness Donna Anna Francesca Ravaschieri Pinelli di Sangro (later 6th Principessa di Belmonte) to the Marchese Don Antonio Pignatelli (later His Serene Highness Prince of Belmonte). In 1722, while Naples was under Austrian rule, the birthday of Empress Elisabeth Christine had to be celebrated with more than ordinary honours, and the viceroy asked Metastasio to compose a serenata for the occasion. Metastasio accepted, but kept his authorship secret. He wrote Gli orti esperidi, which was set to music by Nicola Porpora, and sung by Porpora's pupil, the castrato Farinelli, making a spectacular début, it won the most enthusiastic applause. The Roman prima donna, Marianna Bulgarelli, who played Venus in this opera, spared no pains until she had discovered its author.

Bulgarelli persuaded the poet to give up the law, and promised to secure for him fame and independence if he would devote his talents to the musical drama. In her house Metastasio became acquainted with the greatest composers of the day: Johann Adolph Hasse, Giovanni Battista Pergolesi, Alessandro Scarlatti, Leonardo Vinci, Leonardo Leo, Francesco Durante, and Benedetto Marcello, all of whom would later set his plays to melody. Here too he studied the art of singing, and learned to appreciate the style of such men as Farinelli. Metastasio wrote quickly and his plays were enhanced by being set to music and sung by the greatest singers of the day.

Statue of Metastasio in Rome, in front of the Santa Maria in Vallicella

Metastasio lived with Bulgarelli and her husband in Rome. Moved by an affection half maternal, half romantic, and by admiration for his talent, she adopted him more passionately even than Gravina had done. She took the whole Trapassi family – father, mother, brother, sisters – into her own house. She fostered the poet's genius and pampered his caprices. Under her influence he wrote in rapid succession Didone abbandonata, Catone in Utica, Ezio, Alessandro nell'Indie, Semiramide riconosciuta, Siroe and Artaserse. These dramas were set to music by the chief composers of the day, and performed in the chief towns of Italy.

But meanwhile Bulgarelli was growing older; she had ceased to sing in public; and the poet increasingly felt his dependence upon her kindness irksome. He gained 300 scudi for each opera; this pay, though good, was precarious and he longed for some fixed engagement. In September 1729 he received the offer of the post of court poet to the theatre at Vienna, succeeding Pietro Pariati, with a stipend of 3,000 florins. This he at once accepted. Bulgarelli unselfishly sped him on his way to glory. She took charge of his family in Rome and he set off for Austria.

== Vienna ==
In the early summer of 1730, Metastasio settled at Vienna in an apartment in the so-called 'Michaelerhaus'. This date marks a new period in his artistic activity. Between the years 1730 and 1740 his finest dramas, Adriano in Siria, Demetrio, Issipile, Demofoonte, Olimpiade, La clemenza di Tito, Achille in Sciro, Temistocle and Attilio Regolo, were produced for the imperial theatre. Some of them had to be composed for special occasions, with almost incredible rapidity: Achille in eighteen days, Ipermestra in nine. Poet, composer, musical copyist and singer did their work together in frantic haste. Metastasio understood the technique of his peculiar art in its minutest details. The experience gained at Naples and Rome, quickened by the excitement of his new career at Vienna, enabled him almost instinctively, and as it were by inspiration, to hit the exact mark aimed at in the opera.

The libretto Adriano in Siria was used by more than 60 other composers in the 18th and early 19th century: Antonio Caldara (1732), Giovanni Battista Pergolesi (1734), Francesco Maria Veracini (1735), Baldassare Galuppi (1740), Carl Heinrich Graun (1746), Johann Adolph Hasse (1752), Johann Christian Bach (1765), Luigi Cherubini (1782) and in Adriano in Siria (Mysliveček) from 1776.

In Vienna Metastasio met with no marked social success. His plebeian birth excluded him from aristocratic circles. To make up in some measure for this comparative failure, he enjoyed the intimacy of the Countess Althann, sister-in-law of his old patroness the Princess Belmonte Pignatelli. She had lost her husband, and had some while occupied the post of chief favourite to the emperor. Metastasio's liaison with her became so close that it was believed they had been privately married. He also sent letters to poets like Livia Accarigi, whose work he reviewed and encouraged for publication.

Bulgarelli tired of his absence, and asked Metastasio to get her an engagement at the court theatre. He was ashamed of her and tired of her, and wrote dissuading her from the projected visit. The tone of his letters alarmed and irritated her. She seems to have set out from Rome, but died suddenly upon the road. All we know is that she left him her fortune after her husband's life interest in it had expired, and that Metastasio, overwhelmed with grief and remorse, immediately renounced the legacy. This disinterested act plunged the Bulgarelli-Metastasio household at Rome into confusion. Bulgarelli's widower married again. Metastasio's brother, Leopoldo Trapassi, and his father and sister, were thrown upon their own resources.

As time advanced, the life which Metastasio led at Vienna, together with the climate, told on his health and spirits. From about the year 1745 onward he wrote little, though the cantatas which belong to this period, and the canzonetta Ecco quel fiero istante, which he sent to his friend Farinelli, rank among the most popular of his productions. It was clear, as Vernon Lee has phrased it, that "what ailed him was mental and moral ennui". In 1755 the Countess Althann died, and Metastasio's social contacts were reduced to the gatherings round him in the bourgeois house of his friend Nicolo Martines, the secretary to the papal Nuncio in Vienna. He sank rapidly into the habits of old age; and, though he lived till the year 1782, he was very inactive. He died on 12 April, bequeathing his whole fortune of some 130,000 florins to the six children of Nicolo Martines. He had survived all his Italian relatives.

Throughout the forty years of his career in Vienna, in the course of which Metastasio eventually outlived his own originality and creative powers, his fame went on increasing. In his library he counted as many as forty editions of his own works. They had been translated into French, English, German, Spanish, and modern Greek. They had been set to music over and over again by every composer of distinction. They had been sung by the best virtuosi in every capital, and there was not a literary academy of note which had not conferred on him the honour of membership. Strangers of distinction passing through Vienna made a point of paying their respects to the old poet at his lodgings at Kohlmarkt.

But his poetry was intended for a certain style of music – for the music of omnipotent vocalists, of exceedingly skilled sopranos and castrati. When the operas of Christoph Willibald Gluck and Wolfgang Amadeus Mozart—focusing more on psychology and less on virtuoso singing—came into vogue, a new style of libretto was needed (Mozart did use an old Metastasio libretto for his renowned opera La clemenza di Tito, but, it was substantially re-written for the purpose). The demise of castrato singing meant that Metastasio's operas dropped out of the repertory.

Metastasio's poetry is emotional, lyrical, and romantic. His chief dramatic situations are expressed by lyrics for two or three voices, embodying the several contending passions of the agents brought into conflict by the circumstances of the plot. The total result is not pure literature, but literature fit for musical effect. Language in Metastasio's hands is musical, lucid, and songlike, perhaps due to his experience as an improvisatory poet. He was an admirer of Torquato Tasso, Giambattista Marino, Giovanni Battista Guarini, and Ovid.

Composers continued to set Metastasio's poetry to music even after his death. German composer Georgina Schubert (1840–1878) used his text for her lieder "Gondoliera".

== Works ==
The name of the first composer to set the respective text to music is indicated next to the title

=== Operas ===
- Siface, re di Numidia (1723) – Francesco Feo
- Didone abbandonata (1724) – Domenico Sarro
- L'impresario delle Isole Canarie (1724) – Domenico Sarro
- Siroe re di Persia (1726) – Leonardo Vinci
- Catone in Utica (1728) – Leonardo Vinci
- Ezio (1728) – Nicola Porpora
- Alessandro nell'Indie (1729) – Leonardo Vinci
- Semiramide riconosciuta (1729) – Leonardo Vinci
- Artaserse (1730) – Leonardo Vinci
- Demetrio (1731) – Antonio Caldara
- Issipile (1732) – Francesco Conti
- Adriano in Siria (1732) – Antonio Caldara
- L'Olimpiade (1733) – Antonio Caldara
- Demofoonte (1733) – Antonio Caldara
- La clemenza di Tito (1734) – Antonio Caldara
- Achille in Sciro (1736) – Antonio Caldara
- Ciro riconosciuto (1736) – Antonio Caldara
- Temistocle (1736) – Antonio Caldara
- Zenobia (1737) – Giovanni Bononcini
- Antigono (1743) – Johann Adolph Hasse
- Ipermestra (1744) – Johann Adolph Hasse
- Attilio Regolo (1750) – Johann Adolph Hasse
- Il re pastore (1751) – Giuseppe Bonno
- L'eroe cinese (1752) – Giuseppe Bonno
- Nitteti (1756) – Nicola Conforto
- Il trionfo di Clelia (1762) – Johann Adolph Hasse
- Romolo ed Ersilia (1765) – Johann Adolph Hasse
- Ruggiero (1771) – Johann Adolph Hasse

=== Serenades ===
- Angelica (1720) – Nicola Porpora
- Endimione (1721) – Domenico Sarro
- Gli orti esperdi (1721) – Nicola Porpora
- La Galatea (1722) – Gioseffo Comito
- La contesa de' numi (1729) – Leonardo Vinci
- Il tempio dell'Eternità (1731) — Johann Joseph Fux
- Amor prigioniero (1732) – Luca Antonio Predieri
- L'asilo d'Amore (1732) – Antonio Caldara
- Le cinesi (1735) – Antonio Caldara
- Le grazie vendicate (1735) – Antonio Caldara
- Il palladio conservato (1735) – Johann Georg Reutter
- Il sogno di Scipione (1735) – Luca Antonio Predieri
- Il Parnaso accusato e difeso (1738) – Johann Georg Reutter
- La pace fra la virtù e la bellezza (1738) – Luca Antonio Predieri
- Astrea placata (1739) – Luca Antonio Predieri
- Il natal di Giove (1740) – Giuseppe Bonno
- Il vero omaggio (1743) – Giuseppe Bonno
- La danza (1744) – Giuseppe Bonno
- Augurio di felicità (1749) – Johann Georg Reutter
- La rispettosa tenerezza (1750) — Johann Georg Reutter
- L'isola disabitata (1753) – Giuseppe Bonno
- Tributo di rispetto e d'amore (1754) – Johann Georg Reutter
- Il ciclope (1754)
- La gara (1755) – Johann Georg Reutter
- Il sogno (1756) – Johann Georg Reutter
- La ritrosia disarmata (1759)
- L'ape (1760)
- Il quadro animato (1760) – Georg Christoph Wagenseil
- Alcide al bivio (1760) – Johann Adolph Hasse
- L'Atenaide (Gli affetti generosi) (1762) – Giuseppe Bonno
- Egeria (1764) – Johann Adolph Hasse
- Il Parnaso confuso (1765) – Christoph Willibald Gluck
- Il trionfo d'Amore (1765) – Florian Leopold Gassmann
- La pace fra le tre dee (1765) – Nicola Conforto?
- La corona (1765) – Christoph Willibald Gluck
- Partenope (1767) – Johann Adolph Hasse

=== Oratorios ===
- Per la festività del santo natale (1727) – Giovanni Battista Costanzi
- La passione di Gesù Cristo (1730) – Antonio Caldara
- Sant'Elena al Calvario (1731) – Antonio Caldara
- La morte d'Abel (1732) – Antonio Caldara
- Giuseppe riconosciuto (1733) – Giuseppe Porsile
- Betulia liberata (1734) – Johann Georg Reutter
- Gioas re di Giuda (1735) – Johann Georg Reutter
- Isacco, figura del Redentore (1740) – Luca Antonio Predieri

=== Cantatas ===
- Amor timido
- Il consiglio
- Il nido degli amor
- Il nome
- Il primo amore
- Il ritorno
- Il sogno
- Il tabacco
- Il trionfo della gloria
- Irene
- La cacciatrice
- La cioccolata
- La gelosia
- La Pesca
- La primavera
- L'Armonica
- La scusa
- La tempesta
- L'Aurora
- L'estate
- L'inciampo
- L'inverno
- Pel giorno natalizio di Francesco I
- Pel giorno natalizio di Maria Teresa
- Pel nome glorioso di Maria Teresa
- Primo omaggio del canto
- 11 other cantatas without title

=== Canzonettas ===
- A Nice
- Canzonetta
- La libertà
- La partenza
- La primavera
- L'estate
- Palinodia

=== Other works ===
- Giustino (1712)
- 9 compliments
- 33 stanzas for music
- 32 sonnets
- 4 sacred poems
- Numerous texts for arias
