= Domenico Gnoli (author) =

Italian writer and librarian (1838–1915)

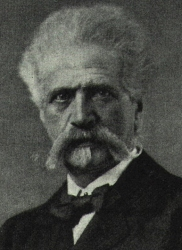
Domenico Gnoli

Domenico Gnoli (6 February 1838 – 12 April 1915) was an Italian author, librarian and art historian.

== Biography ==
Gnoli was born in Rome. He attracted public attention by his volume of poems published under the pseudonym of Dario Gaddi, and a collection of critical essays, Odi Tiberine. He was a professor of Italian literature at Turin, and in 1893 was made prefect of the Library Vittorio Emanuele at Rome. He collaborated on the Nuova Antologia, and co-founded and co-edited the magazine Archivio Storico dell'Arte. He also wrote poetry with his sister, Teresa Gnoli. His translations include the Römische Elegien of Goethe, and various other German classics. Many of his original essays were published in the Nuova Antologia. His other writings are:

- E morto il re (1882).
- Canto dei pellegrini alla tomba del gran re (1883).
- Le opere di Donatello in Roma.
- Il banco d'Agostino Chigi.
