= Giovanni Claudio Pasquini =

Italian poet and librettist

Giovanni Claudio Pasquini (1695 – 1763) was an Italian poet and librettist. Born in Siena, he served at the court of Charles VI, Holy Roman Emperor in Vienna, first as the Italian teacher to Maria Theresa and her younger sister Maria Anna, and from 1733 as the court poet. After the death of Charles VI, he worked in the Habsburg courts of Mannheim and Dresden before returning to Siena in 1749 where he remained for the rest of his life. He wrote the libretti for numerous operas, including Caldara's I disingannati, as well as courtly entertainments and oratorios. From 1754 he devoted himself to religious life and lost his sight the following year. He was appointed vice-rector of the University of Siena in 1758, but his last years were marked by financial worries when his nephew died and Pasquini became to the sole support of his five children.
