= Giuseppe Bonno =

Italian-Austrian composer (1711-1788)

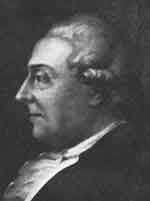
Giuseppe Bonno

Giuseppe Bonno (29 January 1711 – 15 April 1788) (Note: Michael Lorenz gives his first name as "Joseph" because Emperor Joseph I was his godfather; Lorenz also asserts that Bonno was born on 30 January: Haydn Singing at Vivaldi's Exequies: An Ineradicable Myth, 9 June 2014) was an Austrian composer of Italian origin. (His name is sometimes given as Josef or Josephus Johannes Baptizta Bon.)

The son of a footman from Brescia who served at the Austrian court, he was born in Vienna and studied music with Johann Georg Reinhardt, imperial court organist, later Kapellmeister of St Stephen's. A gifted pupil, he was then sent to Naples in 1726 where he studied church music under Francesco Durante and opera under Leonardo Leo. He moved back to Vienna in 1736, becoming a court composer there, and working as Kapellmeister to the Prince of Saxe-Hildburghausen in the 1750s and 1760s. In 1774, Bonno was made Imperial court conductor to Joseph II, following the death of Florian Leopold Gassman. He died in Vienna.

While Bonno's music is rarely heard today, he was a prominent figure in the Viennese musical life of his time and his works were often performed. He worked with two main librettists: Giovanni Claudio Pasquini and Metastasio. The latter was Bonno's contemporary in Vienna, and the composer wrote the first music for Metastasio's Il natale di Giove (also set by Hasse), Il vero omaggio, Il re pastore (later set by Hasse and Mozart), L'eroe cinese (also set by Hasse), L'isola disabitata (also set by Haydn) and L'Atenaide ovvero Gli affetti più generosi.

Most of his output was for vocal forces, including stage works, oratorios, masses and other sacred pieces.

He is a silent supporting character in the play Amadeus written by Peter Shaffer. He is played by Patrick Hines in the film version Amadeus.

== Works ==
=== Oratorios ===
- Eleazaro (1739)
- San Paolo in Athene (1740)
- Isacco figura del redentore (1759) – see Isacco figura del redentore for Metastasio's libretto and settings by other composers
- Il Giuseppe riconosciuto (1774) – see Giuseppe riconosciuto for Metastasio's libretto and settings by other composers

== Sources ==
- Operaglass List of Opera Composers
- Angermüller, Rudolph (1992), 'Bonno, Giuseppe' in The New Grove Dictionary of Opera, ed. Stanley Sadie (London) ISBN 0-333-73432-7
