= Improvisatori =

Italian improvisational poets

The Improvisatori (also spelled "improvvisatori") were a group of Italian improvisational poets who first appeared during the Trecento, and gradually disappeared around 1840. Although few written copies of their poems exist today, the importance of the improvisatori to Italian literature is significant for both their original poetic compositions as well as for the effect they had on the Italian madrigal and the role they may have played in preserving older Italian epics.

== History ==
James Haar traces the figure of the improvisatore (the singular male form of "improvisatori") back to the middle of the 14th century. Throughout the Renaissance (which Haar defines as the period spanning 1350 to 1600), an improvisatore or improvisatrice (singular feminine form of “improvisatori”) was unlikely to glean a living solely from performing improvised poetry (although some, like the Brandolini brothers of the 15th century achieved a modicum of renown). Instead, the improvisatori of the Renaissance were likely to have participated in religious festivals and community celebrations, performing mainly for their friends and neighbours. During this time, however, the improvisatori were closely linked with the performance of sung madrigals, as well as the recitation of Italian oral epics, and the survival of these songs and poems is due in large part to the improvisatori of the Renaissance.

During the Italian literary "period of decadence," which spanned most of the 17th century, Italian literature as a whole produced little notable work. Although the improvisatori likely continued to exist in some fashion during the 17th century, they did not contribute significantly to Italian literature for most of the century.

1690, however, marked the dawn of what Benedetto Croce dubbed a "Golden Era" ("epoca d'oro") of Italian improvisational poetry, which would last until around 1840. During this time, not only did the numbers of the improvisatori increase greatly, but their influence on Italian literature likewise expanded. During the first half of the 18th century, the French diplomat Charles de Brosses wrote about encountering a famous Florentine improvisatore named Bernardo Perfetti, and expressed admiration for Perfetti’s ability to express "true feeling"” in his extemporaneously-composed poetry. By 1754, the improvisatori were relevant enough within Italy that the Italian dramatist Carlo Goldoni published a play titled Poeta fanatico, in which the protagonist is an improvisational poet. During the second half of the 18th century, the importance of the improvisatori continued to increase.

By the dawn of the 19th century, the influence of the improvisatori had expanded beyond the realm of art, and improvisational poets like Corilla were receiving the laurel of Petrarch, Italy's highest poetic honor. Moreover, the improvisatori were by this time so widely respected that they were frequently lauded in foreign travel journals (see “Significance outside of Italy”).

The improvisatori continued to enjoy widespread fame and success during much of the Romantic Era. Improvisatori like Tommaso Sgricci mingled with leading English Romantic poets, including Percy Shelley and Lord Byron. Early 19th century novels, like Germaine de Staël's Corinne, or Italy (1807) and Francesco Furbo’s Andrew of Padua (1820), featured improvisatori as protagonists. By 1840, however, the popularity of the improvisatori had begun to wane, likely due to some combination of stagnation in form and their overexposure to foreign tourists. However, academic interest in the improvisatori remained strong until the end of the nineteenth century, and numerous articles were published on topics ranging from the relation of the improvisatori to the German Meistersinger to the effect Sgricci had on the poetry of Shelley and Byron

== The performance ==
In his Remarks on Antiquities, Art, and Letters during an Excursion in Italy..., a work "cited as a travel classic for over a century", Joseph Forsyth describes an encounter with an improvisatrice as follows:

This lady convenes at her house a group of admirers, whenever she chooses to be inspired… She went round her circle and called on each person for a theme. Seeing her busy with her fan, I proposed the Fan as a subject. In tracing its origin she followed Pignotti and in describing its use she acted and analyzed to us all the coquetry of the thing. She allowed herself no pause… So extensive is her reading, that she can challenge any theme. One morning, after other classical subjects had been sung, a Venetian count gave her the boundless field of Apollonius Rhodius, in which she displayed a minute acquaintance with all the Argonautick [sic] fable.

This improvisatrice (Signora Fantastici) and her rival La Bandettini were street performers, who would frequently pass a hat around before, during, and after improvisations, into which appreciative listeners would make donations. However, there were other settings and styles in which improvisatori might perform.

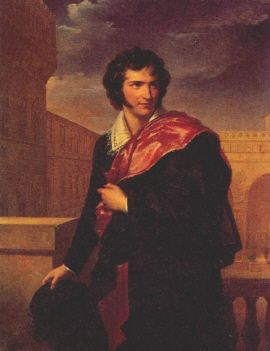
Tommaso Sgricci, by François Gérard (1824). Museo Civico d'Arte, Modena

Beyond using the streets as theatres, some improvisatori performed at private shows. The less-famous of these improvisatori frequently performed at private residences, in which "a small table with writing implements, and an old shattered jingling piano, occupied one side of the room, and a small space was left in front for the poet." Other, more famous improvisatori like Tommaso Sgricci and Bernardo Sestini, could sell out entire theatres, and had to be accompanied by retinues of bodyguards. In both types of private performances, the improvisatore or improvisatrice would still take suggestions for topics to perform on. However, rather than listening to the audience call out themes, the poet requested that audience members write down suggestions on spare pieces of paper and deposit them in a box before the show. The suggestions would then be read to the poet and the audience at the same time, and seconds later, the poet would begin his composition (these readings could elicit significant audience reactions in their own right – Lord Byron reports that, upon hearing "the apotheosis of Vittorio Alfieri" suggested as a topic for Sgricci to improvise upon, "the whole theatre burst into a shout, and the applause was continued for some moments").

In addition to private performances, nationally-celebrated improvisatori (like Sgricci, or Corilla Olimpica, the improvisatrice whose fame and high repute in Italy inspired Madame de Staël's novel Corinne, or Italy, before him) could be called upon to improvise for state functions and national celebrations, while lesser-known improvisatori might solicit donations from wealthy foreign travellers. Moreover, rural improvisatori continued performing for family and neighbours in Tuscan villages, just as their predecessors in the Renaissance used to do. Whatever the occasion or setting, the improvisatori rarely failed to impress their audience. Forsyth writes:

An Italian improvisatore has the benefit of a language rich in echoes. He generally calls in the accompaniment of song, a lute, or a guitar, to set off his verse and conceal any failures. If his theme be difficult, he runs from that into the nearest common place, or takes refuge in loose lyrick [sic] measures. Thus he may always be fluent, and sometimes by accident be bright… Such strains pronounced and sung unmediated, such prompt eloquence, such sentiment and imagery flowing in rich diction, in measure, in rhyme, and in musick [sic], without interruption, and on subjects unforeseen, all this must evince in [the improvisatore] a wonderful command of powers…

== Significance outside of Italy ==
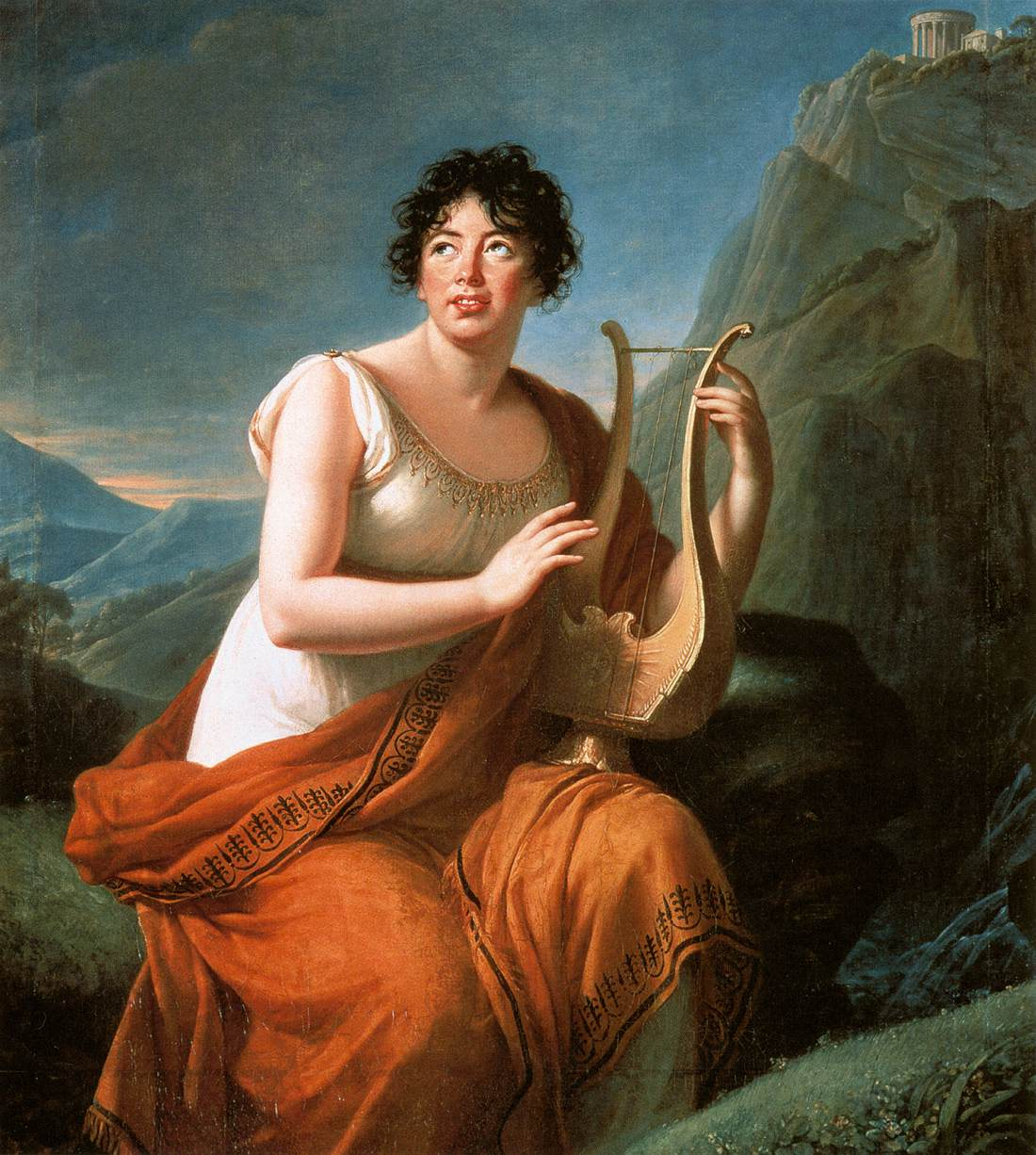
Portrait of Madame de Staël as Corinne on Cape Misenum by Élisabeth Vigée Le Brun, Musée d'Art et d'Histoire (Geneva)

Despite the significant role the improvisatori played in Italian literature from the Renaissance onward, non-Italian recognition of the medium was slow to crystallize. The first French mention of the improvisatori came in de Brosses's letter, which was written circa 1750. According to the Oxford English Dictionary, the first published English mention of the word “improvisatori” or any of its variants came in 1766, with the publication of Tobias Smollett's Travels through France and Italy. During the Romantic Era (c. 1785–1830), however, the improvisatori were frequently mentioned in published travel journals. French writers interested in the improvisatori included Madame de Staël (author of Corinne, or Italy [published 1807], a novel in which the protagonist is an improvisatrice) and Antoine Claude Pasquin (better known as Valery; he mentions no fewer than four improvisatori in his Historical, Literary, and Artistic Travels in Italy… [written between 1826 and 1828]), while the Dutch had Hans Christian Andersen (author of The Improvisatore, published in 1835), and the Germans had Johann Wolfgang von Goethe (whose Italian Journey was written between 1786 and 1788, but not published until 1816).

Despite heavy Continental European interest in the improvisatori, the poets were most enthusiastically admired in England, where they influenced the poets Lord Byron, Percy Shelley, Samuel Taylor Coleridge, John Keats, and Laetitia Landon, among others. The improvisatori naturally appealed to Romantic writers captivated by concepts like William Wordsworth's "spontaneous overflow of emotion" and the broad Romantic concept of untutored genius.

== Criticism of the Improvisatori ==
Although the improvisatori were almost universally admired, the degree of admiration varied considerably. Some writers, like Mary Shelley, believed that extemporaneous composition seemed to connote "a divine inspiration" in the performer. Others, like Byron, were more skeptical. Esterhammer notes "available paradigms for representing the nineteenth-century improvisatore… ranged from Romantic genius to manipulative professional, and responses varied from ridicule to rapture."

While some criticism was directed at the quality of an improvised poem, most critiques were instead focused on the incompatibility of improvisation with the written medium. So, while Caesar notes that the Anglo-Irish diarist Anna Jameson classified one particular improvisation of Sestini’s to be "a failure", and Forsyth discusses an improviser unable to satisfactorily end his performance ("with each verse, he further complicated his plot, frustrating himself and his audience [until] he cursed 'Maledetto!’ and ran off"), these sentiments are exception, rather than rule. Instead, it is far more common for writers to complain about the supposed inconsistencies of improvised works – inconsistencies that usually appear once an improvised poem is examined in a written medium. For example, Byron told Shelley "[Sgricci’s] printed poetry is tame stuff" during a conversation about the phenomenon of improvisational poetry. Similarly, Forsyth lamented

Lady Fantastici [has] a wonderful command of powers; yet, judging from her studied and published compositions, which are dull enough, I should suspect that this impromptu exercise seldom leads to poetical excellence. Serafino d'Acquila, the first improvvisatore that appeared in the language, was gazed at in the Italian courts as a divine and inspired being, till he published his verses and dispelled the illusion.

The notion that improvisers were skilled performers who possessed "skill, practice, [and] talent; but none of the felicities of higher art" frequently accompanied accounts of improvisation, forming a curious contrast with prevailing opinions that improvisers exemplified the Romantic notion of untutored genius.
