= Dido, Queen of Carthage (opera) =

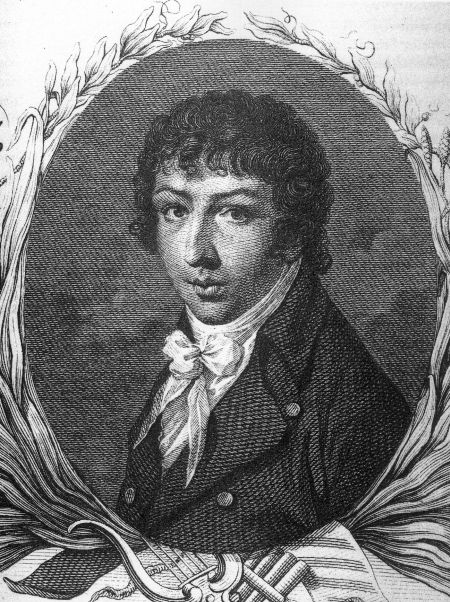
Stephen Storace

Dido, Queen of Carthage was an opera in three acts by Stephen Storace. Its English libretto by Prince Hoare was adapted from Metastasio's 1724 libretto, Didone abbandonata (Dido Abandoned), which had been set by many composers. Storace's opera premiered on 23 May 1792 at The King's Theatre in London combined with a performance of his masque, Neptune's Prophecy. The story is based on that of Dido and Aeneas in the fourth book of Virgil's Aeneid. The opera was not a success and was never revived after its original run of performances. The score has been lost.

== Background and performance history ==
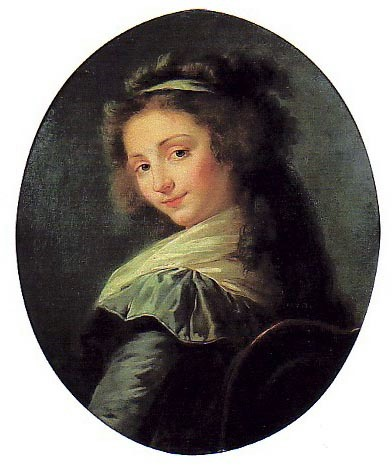
Elisabeth Mara sang the role of Dido in the premiere

Dido, Queen of Carthage, was Storace's first opera seria, and the fourth of his operas to be written for the London stage. His librettist, Prince Hoare, had previously worked with Storace on several afterpieces, including No song, no supper and The Cave of Trophonius. His re-working of Metastasio's Didone abbandonata was to be Hoare's first full-length opera libretto. The 1792 edition of the libretto described the music as "principally new, and composed by Mr. Storace", although there were some arias with music from previous settings of Metastasio's text, most notably Antonio Sacchini's "Son regina e sono amante".

Operas set to Metastasio's Didone abbandonata were not new to the London stage. Previous productions had included: Leonardo Vinci's Didone abbandonata (Royal Opera House, 1737); Johann Hasse's Didone (The King's Theatre, 1748); Vincenzo Ciampi's Didone (The King's Theatre, 1754); Baldassare Galuppi's La Didone abbandonata (The King's Theatre, 1761); Antonio Sacchini's Didone abbandonata (The King's Theatre, 1775); and Pasquale Anfossi's pastiche opera Didone abbandonata (The King's Theatre, 1786)

The lead singers of Storace's opera were well known to London audiences. The celebrated German soprano, Elisabeth Mara, who sang the role of Dido, had made her London stage debut in 1786 in the title role of Anfossi's Didone abbandonata and had sung at the King's Theatre several times in the intervening years. The role of Aeneas was sung en travesti by the English soprano and stage actress, Anna Maria Crouch. Her lover and frequent stage partner, Michael Kelly, sang the tenor role of Iarbas. The pair had appeared in several earlier works by Storace, including No song, no supper (1790) and The Siege of Belgrade (1791) and would later appear in his comic opera The Pirates.

Dido, Queen of Carthage opened on 23 May 1792 at The King's Theatre and was scheduled to run for five performances, one of which (28 May) was a benefit performance for Storace. The production was a lavish one with sets and stage machinery by the noted stage designer, Thomas Greenwood. According to a review in The Morning Herald (24 May 1792), "a procession was introduced in which an ostrich, a dromedary and an elephant marched to slow music". Despite the pageantry, the opera's reception by audiences and critics was tepid and the work was never revived after its initial run. The British playwright and theatre critic, James Boaden, attended the opening night and later recalled:

Mr. Prince Hoare was employed upon the Didone Abbandonata of Metastasio; and fitted its music, I fear, not with syllable, but English words, distributed into recitative and air; and Dido, with immense splendour of scenery, dresses, and decorations, was brought out on the 23rd of May. Madame Mara was your Dido, Kelly Iarbas, and the pious Eneas Mrs Crouch herself! There was, for garnish, a masque, in which Bannister was the Neptune, Miss Collins Venus, and the three Graces, Misses Decamp, Jacobs, and Heard. And yet, all this, with the aid of Sedgewick, and Dignum, and Master Welsh, with supernumeraries out of number, lived only three or four nights, and then vanished like a dream. But the power of Metastasio must not suffer from the harshness of another language, and the taste of a people requiring bolder situations in the drama and a crowd of incidents arranged with little artifice, and ambitious of only striking effects.

No copies of Storace's score exist. It was never published and the original was lost (possibly in the fire that destroyed the Theatre Royal, Drury Lane in 1809).

== Roles ==
- Dido – created by Gertrud Elisabeth Mara
- Aeneas – created by Anna Maria Crouch
- Iarbas – created by Michael Kelly
- Abdalla – created by Charles Dignum
- Almidah – created by Thomas Sedgwick
- Anna – created by Caroline Barclay
- Trojan soldiers, Getulian and Numidian troops, Trojan and Carthaginian attendants

== Synopsis ==
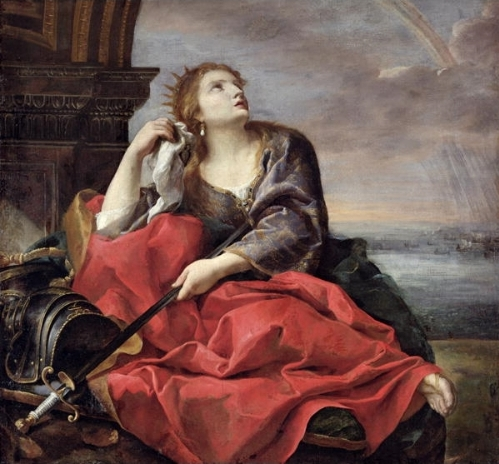
The Death of Dido by Andrea Sacchi

Main opera: Dido, Queen of Carthage

Setting: Ancient Carthage

Dido, Queen of Carthage, is promised in marriage to Iarbas, King of Getulia but has fallen in love with the Trojan warrior Aeneas, who had been shipwrecked on the shores of her city. Iarbas appears (disguised as his own ambassador and using the name "Orodes") to warn Dido that Aeneas cannot become King of Carthage. Nevertheless, Dido refuses to marry Iarbas. Although Aeneas is now in love with Dido, he asks her sister Anna to tell Dido of his plans to leave Carthage for Italy. War then breaks out between Aeneas and Iarbas. Dido convinces Aeneas to become her husband and share the throne of Carthage. However, when the ghost of Aeneas' father reminds him of his duty to his people, Aeneas realises that he must abandon Dido. As Aeneas and his men set sail for Italy and Carthage is besieged by Iarbas and his troops, the heartbroken Dido commits suicide and dies amidst the flames of the city.

Masque: Neptune's Prophecy

Setting: A temple to Neptune

In the patriotic masque which followed the opera performance, Neptune, the god of the sea, appears along with Venus, Ascanius, and the Three Graces to praise the glory of Great Britain as a "god-like race" and to predict that the nation will eclipse both Tyre and Carthage in naval fame.

== Sources ==
- Boaden, James, Memoirs of the Life of John P. Kemble, R.H. Small, 1825
- Bono, Paola and Tessitore, Maria Vittoria, "Didone en travesti: un'eroina tragica in commedia" in Viola Papetti (ed.), Le forme del teatro, Volume 8, Edizioni di Storia e Letteratura, 1997. ISBN 88-87114-04-8
- Burden, Michael, Metastasio on the British Stage 1728–1840, a catalogue, Oxford University Research Archive, 2008 (accessed 6 December 2009)
- Edgcumbe, Richard, Musical Reminiscences of an Old Amateur, W. Clarke, 1827
- Girdham, Jane (2001). "Storace, Stephen (John Seymour)". In Sadie, Stanley; Tyrrell, John (eds.). The New Grove Dictionary of Music and Musicians (2nd ed.). London: Macmillan. ISBN 978-1-56159-239-5.
- Marshall, Julian (2001). "Mara, Gertrud Elisabeth". In Sadie, Stanley; Tyrrell, John (eds.). The New Grove Dictionary of Music and Musicians (2nd ed.). London: Macmillan. ISBN 978-1-56159-239-5.
- Nicoll, Allardyce, A History of English Drama 1660-1900, Volume 3, Cambridge University Press, 2009. ISBN 0-521-10930-2
- Price, Curtis Alexander et al., Italian Opera in Late Eighteenth-century London: The King's Theatre, Haymarket, 1778-1791, Oxford University Press, 1995. ISBN 0-19-816166-2
- The Gentleman's Magazine, Obituary: Prince Hoare, Esq. F.S.A., Volume 158, June 1835, p. 662
- Walker's Hibernian Magazine, "Account of a new serious opera, called Dido Q. of Carthage" Part 2, 1792
