= Gli equivoci =

Italian opera buffa

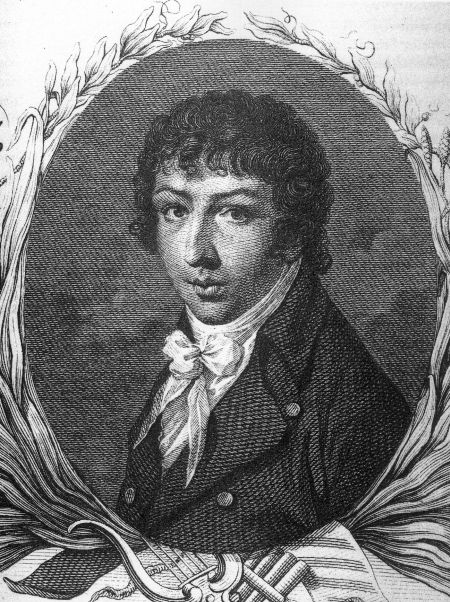
Stephen Storace

Gli equivoci (The Misunderstandings), is an Italian opera buffa by Stephen Storace to a libretto by Lorenzo Da Ponte, based on Shakespeare's The Comedy of Errors.

Following the success of his libretto for The Marriage of Figaro, Da Ponte was asked by Storace to provide for him a libretto based on Shakespeare. Da Ponte compressed Shakespeare's plot into two acts, but retained nearly all the key elements. Gli equivoci was the second of Storace's operas to be performed at the Burgtheater.

Storace composed the opera following the success of his opera Gli sposi malcontenti in the previous year.

Storace reused some of the music of Gli equivoci in his English operas, including No Song, No Supper and The Pirates.

== Performance history ==
The opera was first performed on 27 December 1786 in the Burgtheater, Vienna.

== Roles ==
Roles, voice types, premiere cast
Role	Voice type	Premiere cast, 27 December 1786
Eufemio of Syracuse, son of Egeon and twin brother of Eufemio of Ephesus	tenor	Vincenzo Calvesi
Dromio of Syracuse, servant of Eufemio of Syracuse and twin brother of Dromio of Ephesus	baritone	
Eufemio of Ephesus, son of Egeon and twin brother of Eufemio of Syracuse	tenor	Michael Kelly
Dromio of Ephesus, servant of Eufemio of Ephesus and twin brother of Dromio of Syracuse	baritone	
Silinus, Duke of Ephesus	baritone	
Egeon, a merchant from Syracuse	baritone	
Sofronia, wife of Eufemio of Ephesus	soprano	Nancy Storace
Sostrate, sister of Sofronia	soprano	
Angelo, a goldsmith	baritone	
Lesbia, wife of Dromio of Syracuse	soprano	
Dromia, young child of Lesbia and Dromio of Syracuse	soprano	
