= Prima la musica e poi le parole =

Opera by Antonio Salieri

- Opera by Antonio Salieri
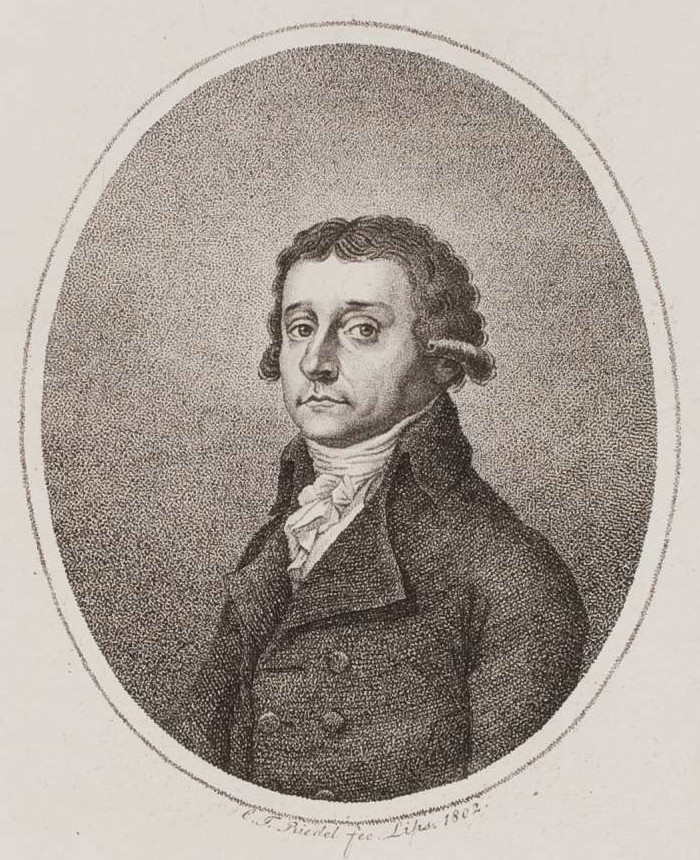
- Antonio Salieri, 1802 engraving
- Librettist: Giovanni Battista Casti
- Language: Italian
- Premiere: 7 February 1786; Orangery of Schönbrunn Palace, Vienna

Prima la musica e poi le parole (First the music and then the words) is an opera in one act by Antonio Salieri to a libretto by Giovanni Battista Casti. The work was first performed on 7 February 1786 in Vienna, following a commission by the Emperor Joseph II. The opera (more specifically, a divertimento teatrale) was first performed at one end of the orangery of the Schönbrunn Palace in Vienna by an Italian troupe; on the same occasion, Mozart's Der Schauspieldirektor was staged at the other end.

The title of the opera is the theme of Richard Strauss's opera Capriccio which debates the relative importance of music and drama in opera.

The autograph manuscript of the opera is preserved in the Austrian National Library.

== Roles ==
Roles, voice types, premiere cast
Role	Voice type	Premiere cast, 7 February 1786
Eleonora, a prima donna	soprano	Nancy Storace
The composer	bass	Stefano Mandini
The poet	bass	Francesco Benucci
Tonina, a comic singer	soprano	Celeste Coltellini

== Synopsis ==
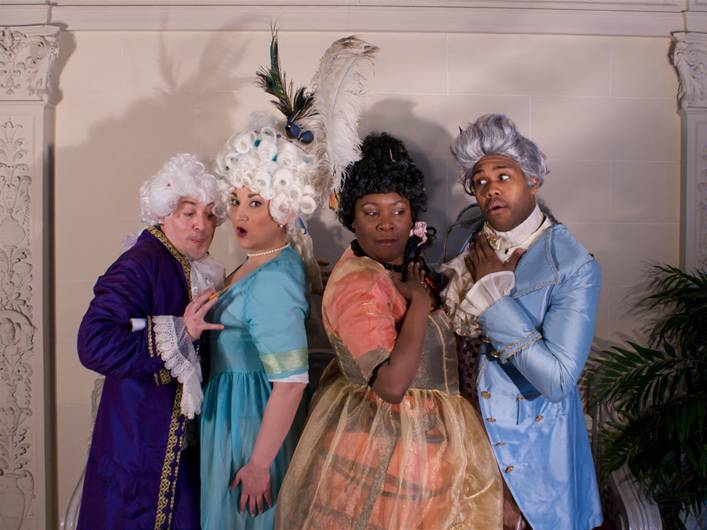
Scene from a performance by Pittsburgh Festival Opera

Count Opizio contracts a new opera to be written to be ready in four days. The composer has already created the score, but the poet is suffering from writer's block and resorts to trying to adapt previous verses he has written to the existing music. The composer and poet are interrupted when Eleonora, the prima donna hired by the Count, enters and delivers a sample of her vocal artistry. Together with the Poet and the Maestro, she acts out a scene from Giuseppe Sarti's Giulio Sabino that devolves into a grotesque parody. Eleonora exits, and the librettist and the composer again wrestle with the problems of the libretto for the new opera in which a lengthy dispute between the two men ensues. Tonina (whose character is a parody of opera buffa) enters and demands a role in the new opera. The composer and the librettist quickly concoct a vocal number for her. A quarrel then erupts between Eleonora and Tonina over which of them should sing the opera's opening aria. The scene culminates in having both sing their arias simultaneously. The composer and the librettist are able to pacify the two ladies by agreeing to a juxtaposition of the seria and buffa styles, thereby putting a conciliatory end to their quarrel.

== Recordings ==
Year	Cast: Eleonora, The composer, The poet, Tonina	Conductor, opera house and orchestra	Label
1986	Maria Casula, Graziano Polidori, Giorgio Gatti, Kate Gamberucci	Domenico Sanfilippo, Orchestra da Camera della Filarmonica della Boemia del nord	CD: Bongiovanni; Cat: GB 2063/4-2
1987	Roberta Alexander, Robert Holl, Thomas Hampson, Julia Hamari	Nikolaus Harnoncourt, Royal Concertgebouw Orchestra	CD: Teldec; Cat: 8 43336
2002	Melba Ramos, Manfred Hemm, Oliver Widmer, Eva Mei	Nikolaus Harnoncourt, Concentus Musicus Wien	CD: Belvedere; Cat: 08035
