= Vincenzo Calvesi =

Italian opera singer

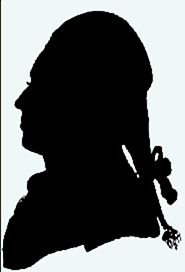
Silhouette of Vincenzo Calvesi

Vincenzo Calvesi (fl. 1777–1811) was an Italian operatic tenor and impresario. A skillful lyric tenor, he began his career performing in opera houses in Italy during the 1770s. He was active in Dresden in 1782 to 1783 and then spent most of his time performing in Vienna from 1785 to 1794. He is best remembered today for creating the role of Ferrando in the world premiere of Wolfgang Amadeus Mozart's Così fan tutte in 1790. That same year the Viennese publication Grundsätze zur Theaterkritik described him as "one of the best tenors from Italy…with a voice naturally sweet, pleasant and sonorous." He was later active in Rome as an impresario up until 1811.

== Life and career ==
Calvesi was born in Rome, the son of Bernhard Calvesi, a papal chamberlain. His date of birth, his musical education, and the details of his youth are now unknown. The first definite account of the singer was in 1777 for a series of performances in operas in Rome. He actively performed in comic operas in Italy up through 1782. From 1782 to 1783 he sang in Dresden at the newly opened Kurfürstliches Hoftheater. In 1784 he appeared at La Scala in the Milan premiere of Domenico Cimarosa's Chi dell'altrui si veste presto si spogli. While performing in Italy he married the soprano Teresa Calvesi who specialized in comprimario and soubrette roles.

In 1785 Calvesi and his wife joined the roster of singers at the Burgtheater in Vienna. Calvesi made his first appearance at that opera house as Sandrino in Giovanni Paisiello's Il re Teodoro in 1785. In July of that year he created the role of Casimiro in the premiere of Stephen Storace's Gli sposi malcontenti. On 8 January 1788 he performed the role of Atar in the premiere of Antonio Salieri's Axur, re d'Ormus opposite his wife as Fiammetta. Tesesa sang supporting roles in Vienna, often in productions with her husband, up through 1791; with Ippolito in Paisiello's Fedra being her greatest success. She was then active in theatres in London and Italy while her husband remained in Austria.

Calvesi continued to perform at the Burgtheater until 1794, with the exception of the majority of 1788, when he was at the Teatro di San Carlo in Naples. He sang in several more world premieres at the Burgtheater, most notably portraying the role of Ferrando in the premiere of Mozart's Così fan tutte on 26 January 1790. Other roles he created in Vienna were Artemidoro in Salieri's La grotta di Trofonio (12 October 1785), Eufemio of Syracuse in Storace's Gli equivoci (27 December 1786), Prince Don Giovanni in Vicente Martín y Soler's Una cosa rara (17 November 1786), and Endimione in Soler's L'arbore di Diana (1 October 1787). On 5 November 1785 he performed the part of the Count in the world premiere of Mozart's quartet Dite almeno, in che mancai, K. 479. He also sang in the premiere of Mozart's trio Mandina amabile, K. 480 on the following 21 November, which was written by Mozart for Francesco Bianchi's La villanella rapita.

In 1794 Calvesi retired from the stage and returned to his native Italy. Somewhere around 1796 he began working in Rome as an impresario. He was one of the city's leading organizers of concerts and theatrical events up through 1811. After that his whereabouts and activities are unknown.
