= The Siege of Belgrade =

1791 pasticcio opera by Stephen Storace

The Siege of Belgrade is a comic opera in three acts, principally composed by Stephen Storace to an English libretto by James Cobb. It incorporated music by Mozart, Salieri, Paisiello and Martini, and is therefore considered a pasticcio opera, as well as a Singspiel in English language, as it contained a spoken dialogue. It premiered on 1 January 1791 at the Theatre Royal, Drury Lane, in London with a great success, featuring many famous singers and actors of the time, such as sopranos Nancy Storace and Anna Maria Crouch, tenor Michael Kelly as well as Shakespearean actors with singing skills such as John Bannister and Richard "Dicky" Suett.

== Roles ==
Roles and performers at the premiere in London on 1 January 1791:

Men

- Saraskier, the leader of Turkish forces (tenor) – Mr. Kelly
- Colonel Cohenberg, Austrian Commander (spoken role) – Mr. Palmer
- Krohnfeldt (spoken role) – Mr. R. Palmer
- Ismael, Commissioner of Saraskier and Yuseph (baritone) – Mr. Fox
- Yuseph, Turkish kadi (tenor) – Mr. Suett
- Leopold, Serbian peasant, in love with Lilla (tenor) – Mr. Bannister Jr.
- Peter, Serbian peasant, Lilla's brother and in love with Ghita (tenor) – Mr. Dignum
- Anselm, Serbian peasant (baritone) – Mr. Cook (later Mr. Sedgewick)
- Michael (spoken role) – Mr. Hollingsworth
- Soldier (tenor) – Mr. Dubois

Women

- Lilla, Serbian peasant girl, Peter's sister (soprano) – Signora Storace
- Catherine, wife of colonel Cohenberg (soprano) – Mrs. Crouch
- Ghita, Serbian peasant girl (soprano) – Mrs. Bland
- Fatima (spoken role) – Miss Hagley

Soldiers, Guards, Peasants, etc.

== Notable musical numbers ==
- "When justice claims the victim due" (Act 1, Trio for the Seraskier, Lilla and Ghita), originally sung by Michael Kelly, Nancy Storace and Mrs. Bland
- "Domestic peace, my soul's desire" (Act 3, Lilla's aria), originally sung by Nancy Storace

== See also ==
- Siege of Belgrade (1789)
