= Stefano Mandini =

Italian operatic baritone (1750–c. 1810)

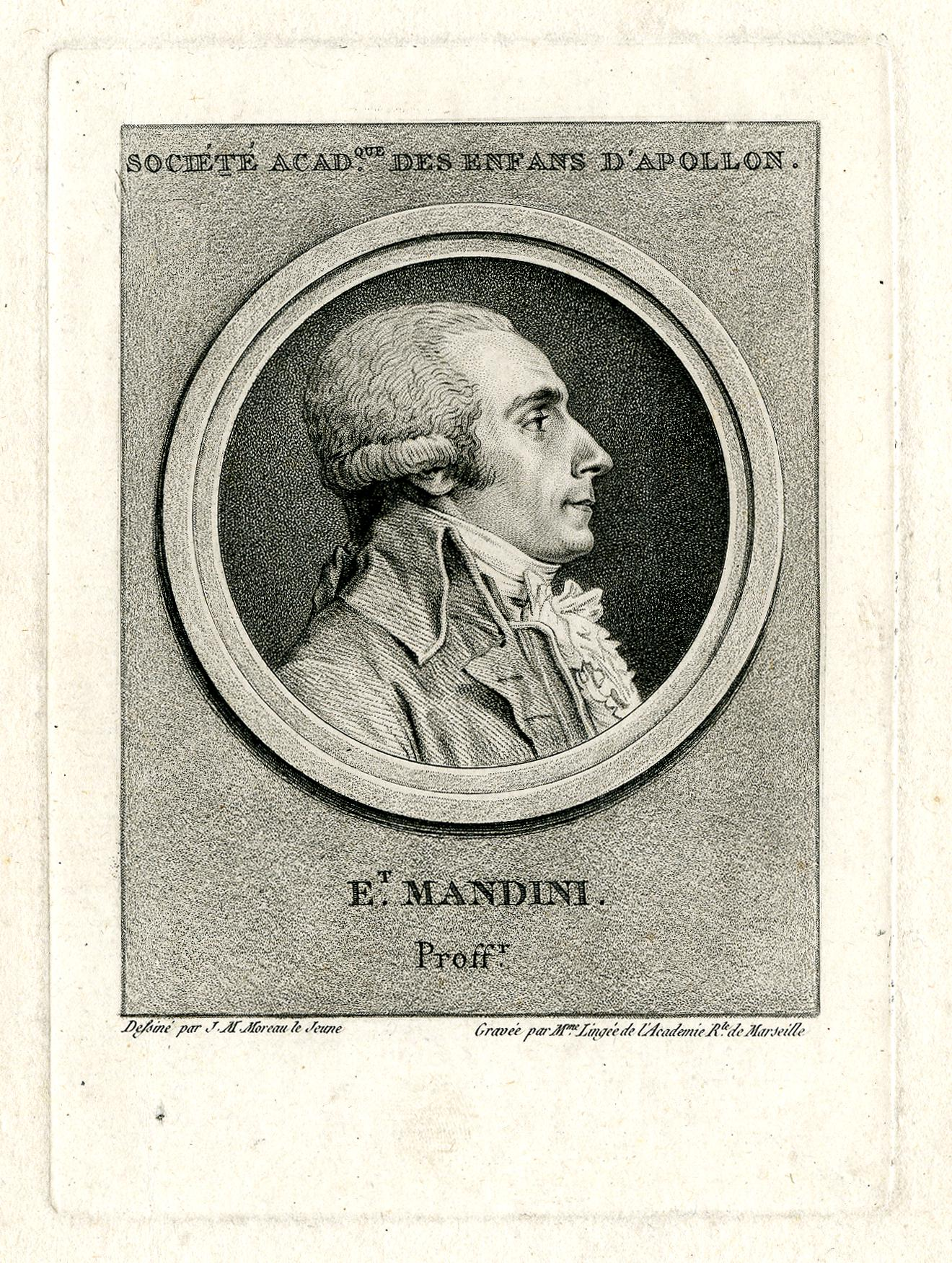
Stefano Mandini; engraving from the late 1780s by Thérèse Eléonore Lingée after a drawing by Jean-Michel Moreau the Younger. From the collections of the British Museum. The French caption reads "Academic Society of the Children of Apollo / Et(ienne) Mandini, Professor", where "Etienne" is French for "Stefano".

Stefano Mandini (1750 – ca. 1810) was an outstanding Italian operatic baritone of the second half of the 18th century. He appeared in the premieres of many well-known operas of his day, of which the most famous at the present time is Mozart's The Marriage of Figaro, for which Mandini created the role of Count Almaviva.

== Career ==
His career began in Italy with performances in Ferrara in 1774 and Parma in 1776. A key event occurred when Emperor Joseph II of Austria chose to found a top-rank Italian opera company at his capital in Vienna, and sent his representatives seeking the best available talent. Mandini was recruited during this search, and first sang in the Emperor's company on 5 May 1783 as Milord Arespingh in L'italiana in Londra by Domenico Cimarosa. He sang in a number of operas with the company, including the following:

- 1783
  - Mingone in Giuseppe Sarti's Fra i due litiganti il terzo gode
  - Don Fabio in Cimarosa's Il falegname
  - Count Almaviva in Giovanni Paisiello's The Barber of Seville
- 1784
  - Le vicende d'amore (P. A. Guglielmi)
  - La finta amante and Il re Teodoro in Venezia (Paisiello)
  - La vendemmia (Giuseppe Gazzaniga)
- 1785
  - Artidoro in Stephen Storace's Gli sposi malcontenti
  - Plistene in Antonio Salieri's La grotta di Trofonio
- 1786
  - the Poet in Salieri's Prima la musica e poi le parole
  - Count Almaviva in Mozart's Le nozze di Figaro (1 May)
  - Lubino in Martín y Soler's Una cosa rara
  - Sarti's I finti eredi
  - Paisiello's Le gare generose
- 1787–88
  - Leandro in Paisiello's Le due contesse
  - Doristo in Martín y Soler's L'arbore di Diana
  - Biscroma in Salieri's Axur, re d'Ormus

It can be seen that Mandini created the role of Count Almaviva twice: the Count appears as a character in two operas derived from the plays of Beaumarchais, The Barber of Seville (set by Paisiello, and later, more famously, by Rossini); and The Marriage of Figaro, set by Mozart. Remarkably, the Paisiello role is for a tenor, the Mozart role for baritone; Mandini's great vocal range enabled him to take both parts.

Mandini left Vienna, following a gala benefit concert for himself, in 1788. He moved to sing in Naples, later Paris, again Vienna, and Saint Petersburg.

He was married to Maria Mandini, a French soprano, also member of the Vienna company.

== His connection with Mozart ==
The first time Mozart composed music for Mandini to sing was not a complete opera but rather an insertion piece, composed for a revival performance of Francesco Bianchi's opera La villanella rapita. This is the trio "Mandina amabile", K. 480, from act 1 of the opera, performed 5 and 21 November, 1785.

When Mandini was cast as Count Almaviva in Mozart's Le Nozze di Figaro (premiered 1 May 1786), Mozart followed his normal practice in tailoring the music to the singer's strengths. In the opera, the biggest scene for the Count is his long solo appearance near the start of Act 3, where he first ponders his options (recitative), then expresses rage at Figaro (Allegro maestoso), and finally breaks out into triumph and joy (Allegro assai) as he imagines revenge. Keefe notes that in preparing this scene, Mozart followed his normal practice, preparing a particella, a score "comprising vocal lines, an instrumental bass line and occasional instrument material" (this is known today because the parts of the particella were in darker ink). Keefe suggests that, at Mozart's invitation, Mandini inspected the particella and requested a change, namely the insertion of coloratura material near the very end. Mozart obliged him with three measures of virtuosity, with rapid triplets rising to a trill on C sharp. Thus some of the actual content of the opera may be attributable to Mandini's influence.

Lyrics: "and makes me rejoice"

Dietrich Fischer-Dieskau

== Assessment ==
Keefe (2017), drawing on press comments of Mandini's time, infers he was capable of "splendid acting" and possessed "strong vocal technique". The tenor Michael Kelly, who sang with Mandini in the Marriage of Figaro premiere, felt that his two baritone collaborators, Mandini and the celebrated Francesco Benucci (who sang Figaro) were "the two best comic singers in Europe". When he journeyed to Saint Peterburg, his singing was admired by the painter Élisabeth Vigée Le Brun.
