= The Pirates (opera) =

1792 opera by Stephen Storace

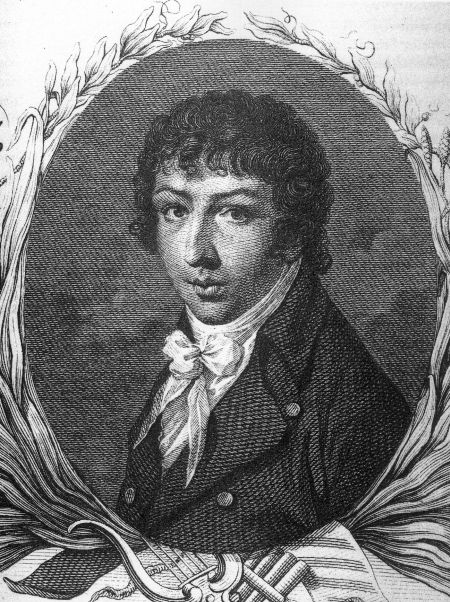
Stephen Storace

The Pirates is an opera by composer Stephen Storace with an English libretto by James Cobb. The work was partly adapted from Storace's 1786 opera Gli equivoci and is remarkable as affording one of the earliest instances of the introduction of a grand finale into an English opera. The work premiered at the Haymarket Theatre on November 21, 1792. The opera became a huge success and is considered by many music critics to be Storace's best composition. It was chosen as the starring prima buffa to be performed for King George III at the King's Theatre, London on 16 May 1794.

== Roles ==
Role	Voice type	Premiere Cast, November 21, 1792
Don Altador	tenor	Michael Kelly
Don Gaspero	tenor	Richard "Dicky" Suett
Don Guilermo	baritone	Mr. Sedgwick
Blazio	tenor	John Bannister
Genariello	tenor	Charles Dignum
Sotillo	-	Ralph Wewitzer
Captain of the Guard	bass	Mr. Cook
Cosmino	-	Mr. Phillimore
Captain of the ship	-	Mr. Benson
Donna Aurora	soprano	Anna Maria Crouch
Fidelia	soprano	Maria Bland
Fabulina	soprano	Nancy Storace
Marietta	soprano	Adelaide Du Camp

== Musical numbers ==
Act I

- "Overture" – The Orchestra
- Chorus: "Thanks to the brisk and fav'ring gale" - chorus of sailors and lazzaroni
- Air: "Of a vile lack of honesty Grumblers complain" - Genariello
- Air: "Some device my aim to cover" - Altador
- Duet: "Signor! Signor!" - Fabulina and Altador
- Air: "Oh! the pretty creature!" - Blazio
- Air: "Love, like the opening flower" - Aurora
- Trio: "Past toils thus recompensing" - Guillermo, Aurora, Altador
- Finale: "Peaceful slumb'ring on the ocean"

Act II

- Trio: "To hear our suit do not refuse" - Aurora, Fabulina, Gasparo
- Air: "There, the moon-silver'd waters roam" - Guillermo
- Air: "A saucy knave who pass'd the door" - Fabulina
- Air: "Oh dear! What shall I do?" - Blazio
- Glee: "Let mirth and joy appear" - Fabulina, Marietta, etc.
- Air: "Memory repeating" - Altador
- Air: "In childhood's careless happy day" - Fidelia
- Second Finale: "Unhand me, cowards, give me way" - Altador, etc.

Act III

- Chorus: "To the vineyard's praise, the chorus raise" - chorus of vintagers
- Air: "My rising spirits thronging" - Fidelia
- Air: "As wrapt in sleep I lay" - Aurora
- Air: "No more his fears alarming" - Fabulina
- Chorus: "Our faith thus pledg'd, join hand to hand" - chorus and Guillermo
- Air: "Scarcely had the blushing morning" - Altador
- Duet: "The jealous Don won't you assume when you marry?" - Fabulina and Blazio
- Air: "Careful the winding path explore" - Marietta
- Trio: "We the veil of fate undraw" - Fabulina, Fidelia, and Altador
- Trio: "Oh! softly flow thou briny tide - Fabulina, Fidelia, and Altador
- Finale: "Now constancy its meed shall gain" -

Storace reused some of the music from his 1785 opera Gli sposi malcontenti in The Pirates.

== Later productions ==
On 29 November 1827, the opera was revived at Drury Lane with the title Isidore de Merida. Most of Storace's music was retained but set to a new libretto, probably due to the original libretto's lack of publication.

== Works consulted ==
- Cobb, James (1792), The Songs, Duets, Trios, Chorusses, &c. In The Pirates, An Opera, In Three Acts, London: E. Cox
- Girdham, Jane (2002), "Pirates, The", Grove Music Online, Oxford University Press
