= Axur, re d'Ormus =

Opera by Antonio Salieri

- Opera by Antonio Salieri
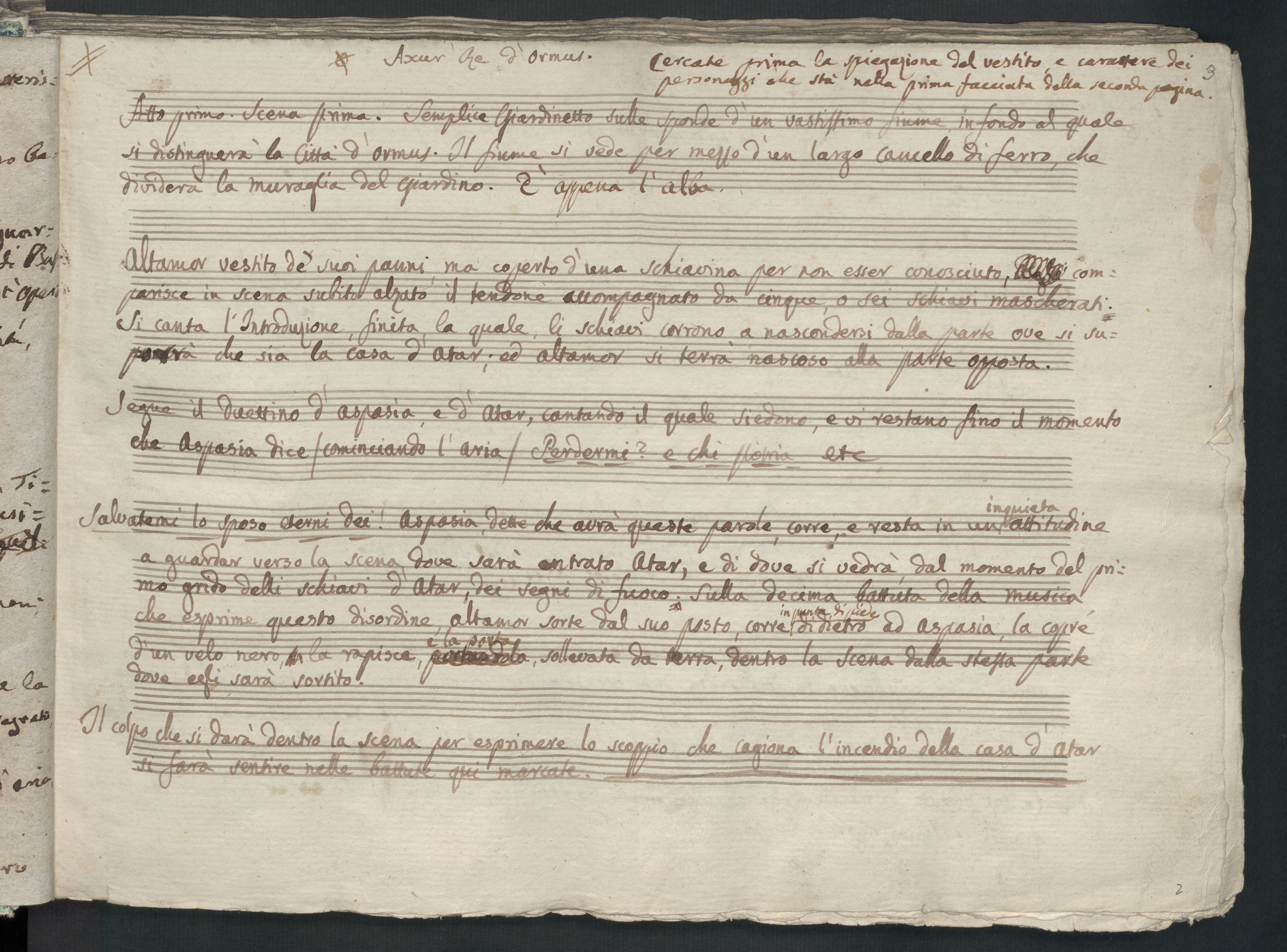
- Page from the manuscript
- Librettist: Lorenzo Da Ponte
- Language: Italian
- Premiere: 8 January 1788; Burgtheater, Vienna

Axur, re d'Ormus ("Axur, king of Ormus") is an operatic dramma tragicomico in five acts by Antonio Salieri. The libretto was by Lorenzo Da Ponte. Axur is the Italian version of Salieri's 1787 French-language work Tarare which had a libretto by Beaumarchais.

== Synopsis ==
Axur, King of the Persian Gulf kingdom of Ormus, orders one of his soldiers, Altamor, to abduct Aspasia, the wife of Atar, the heroic commander of Axur's army. Not knowing who kidnapped Aspasia but suspecting an overseas enemy, Atar speaks with the king and begs for justice. Moved by his appeal, Axur allows Atar to take a ship and seek his wife. Before Atar leaves, Axur's slave-servant, Biscroma, tells the general that the king has abducted Aspasia and hidden her in the royal harem. Enemy troops now threaten to invade Ormus, and the people plead with Atar to save them. Axur undermines Atar by telling the people that the general has better things to do than lead the army. Enraged, Atar declares himself ready to stand at the head of the army and wipe out the nation's enemies.

While a feast is being held prior to the battle, Biscroma disguises Atar as a Nubian and smuggles him into the harem. Axur discovers "the Nubian" in the harem, but does not realize who he is. Axur decides to marry Aspasia to the Nubian as punishment for being unfaithful to Atar. Axur then changes his mind, and instead sends a squad of soldiers into the harem to kill "the Nubian". The soldiers discover "the Nubian's" true identity. They decide not to kill Atar, because they only have orders to kill "the Nubian" and not the general of the army. But they have orders to arrest Atar, so they do so and bring him before the king. Atar is dragged into court as Axur is wooing Aspasia. The husband and wife embrace. Axur sentences Atar to death for violating the royal harem, and Atar is dragged off to the place of execution. But a crowd surrounds the palace and demands Atar's freedom so that he can save the nation. Axur, realizing he has lost the love of the people, removes his crown and commits suicide. The people proclaim Atar the new King of Ormus.

== Performance history ==
Axur premiered at the Burgtheater in Vienna on 8 January 1788, the title role being sung by Francesco Benucci, Mozart's first Figaro. It became one of the most famous operas in Vienna.

The finale of Axur appears in the 1984 film Amadeus. The film is incorrect in presenting Axur as being performed soon after the ninth and final performance of Mozart's Marriage of Figaro in 1786, and before the death of Mozart's father Leopold Mozart on 28 May 1787. Also, the end of the aria "Son Queste Le Speranze" appears briefly at the beginning of the film, Salieri remembering Caterina Cavalieri singing this, as he demonstrates to the priest a sample of pieces he wrote.

== Roles ==
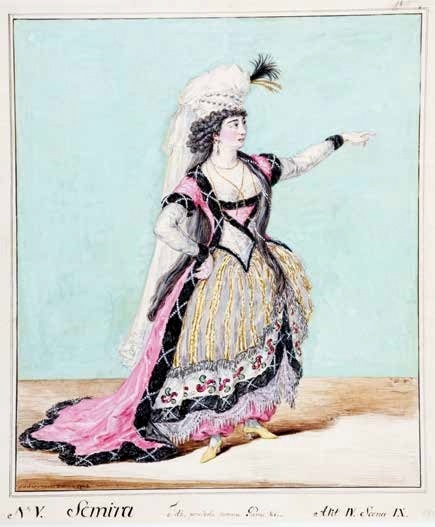
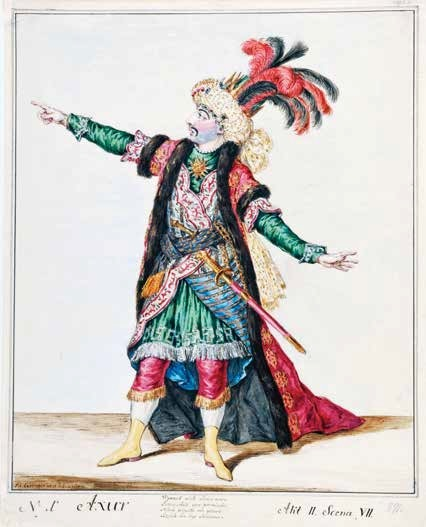
Costume design

Roles, voice types, premiere cast
Role	Voice type	Premiere cast, 8 January 1788 Conductor: Antonio Salieri
Axur, King of Ormus	baritone	Francesco Benucci
Arteneo, High Priest of Brahma	baritone	Francesco Bussani
Altamor, a soldier, Arteneo's son	bass	Lodovico Trentanove
Atar, a soldier	tenor	Vincenzo Calvesi
Aspasia, Atar's wife	soprano	Luisa Laschi-Mombelli
Biscroma, a slave	Bass/Baritone	Stefano Mandini
Fiammetta, Biscroma's wife	soprano	Teresa Calvesi
Elamir	soprano	Franziska Distler
Urson, a soldier	bass	Niccolò Del Sole
A slave	bass	
Arlecchino	tenor	
Smeraldina	soprano	
Brighella	baritone	
Slaves, soldiers, priests of Brahma, people

== Recordings ==
- 1989 – Andrea Martin (Axur), Curtis Rayam (Atar), Eva Mei (Aspasia), Ettore Nova (Biscroma), Ambra Vespasiani (Fiammetta), Massimo Valentini (Arteneo), Michele Porcelli (Altamor), Mario Cecchetti (Urson), Sonia Turchetta (Elamir), Giovanni Battista Palmieri (Arlecchino) – Coro "Guido d'Arezzo", Russian Philharmonic Orchestra, René Clemencic – 3 CDs Nuova Era

Clemencic's recording was and still is the only recording of the complete opera, but it was criticised for its bad sound quality and overall mediocre orchestral playing.

In 1984, Sir Neville Marriner recorded two excerpts from Axur, re d'Ormus for the film Amadeus – the aria "Son queste le speranze" and the finale – with the soprano Suzanne Murphy and the Academy and Chorus of St. Martin in the Fields. The finale was featured in the release of the film's album, with the aria being included in only select albums as a bonus track. The overture was recorded in 1992 by the Slovak Radio Symphony Orchestra under Michel Dittrich on the Naxos label, and the aria "Son queste le speranze" was recorded in 2014 with the soprano Sen Guo and the Musikkollegium Winterthur under Douglas Boyd on the MDG label.
