= Francesco Benucci =

Italian operatic bass-baritone

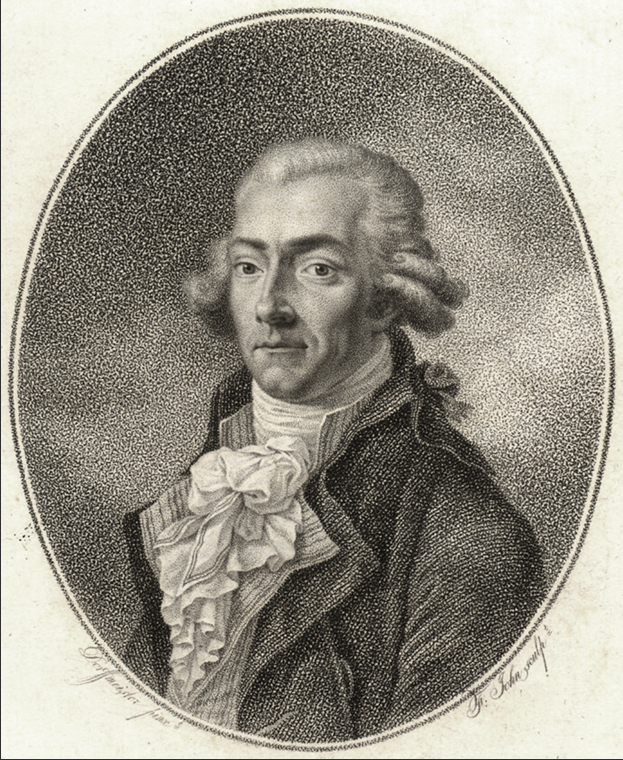
Engraved portrait of Francesco Benucci by Friedrich John, after a painting by Joseph Dorffmeister, c. 1800

Francesco Benucci (c. 1745 – 5 April 1824) was an Italian bass singer of the 18th century. He sang a number of important roles in the operas of Wolfgang Amadeus Mozart, Antonio Salieri and other composers.

== Life ==
=== Historical background and early career ===
He was born c. 1745 in Livorno and began his early career there around 1768. The start of Benucci's career took place in an already flourishing world of opera buffa, which provided an existing role type, the comic bass singer or buffo, at which Benucci came to excel. The historical background is described by Rice:

In one of his earliest appearances (Livorno 1768) Benucci sang Tritemio in Il filosofo di campagna. That he began his career in an opera by Galuppi and Goldoni and in a role created by Carattoli is emblematic of his place in the history of opera buffa. He took up the tradition ... to which Goldoni, in collaboration with composers as Galuppi and such singers as Carattoli, had contributed so much in the late 1740s and 1750s; he maintained and developed that tradition for a new generation of operatic audiences, many of whom had never seen Carattoli perform.

He performed in Florence in 1769. No record survives of Benucci's activities between spring 1769 and 1774. He spent the years 1774 to 1777 in Madrid, and starting in autumn 1777, there is documentation of performances in the major opera houses of Italy, including Venice, Milan, and Rome.

=== The move to Vienna ===
In 1783 the Austrian Emperor Joseph II founded a new opera company specializing in Italian opera buffa. At the time Benucci was singing at the Teatro San Samuele in Venice. Count Giacomo Durazzo, who was both an experienced former theater director and the Emperor's ambassador, was able to secure his services. At the same time Durazzo recruited the English soprano Nancy Storace, who was also singing at San Samuele. Storace was later to sing the role of Susanna when Benucci sang the title role at the premiere of The Marriage of Figaro. Both singers were offered high salaries, over 4000 florins. With further recruitment (notably the librettist Lorenzo Da Ponte), an outstanding ensemble was formed.

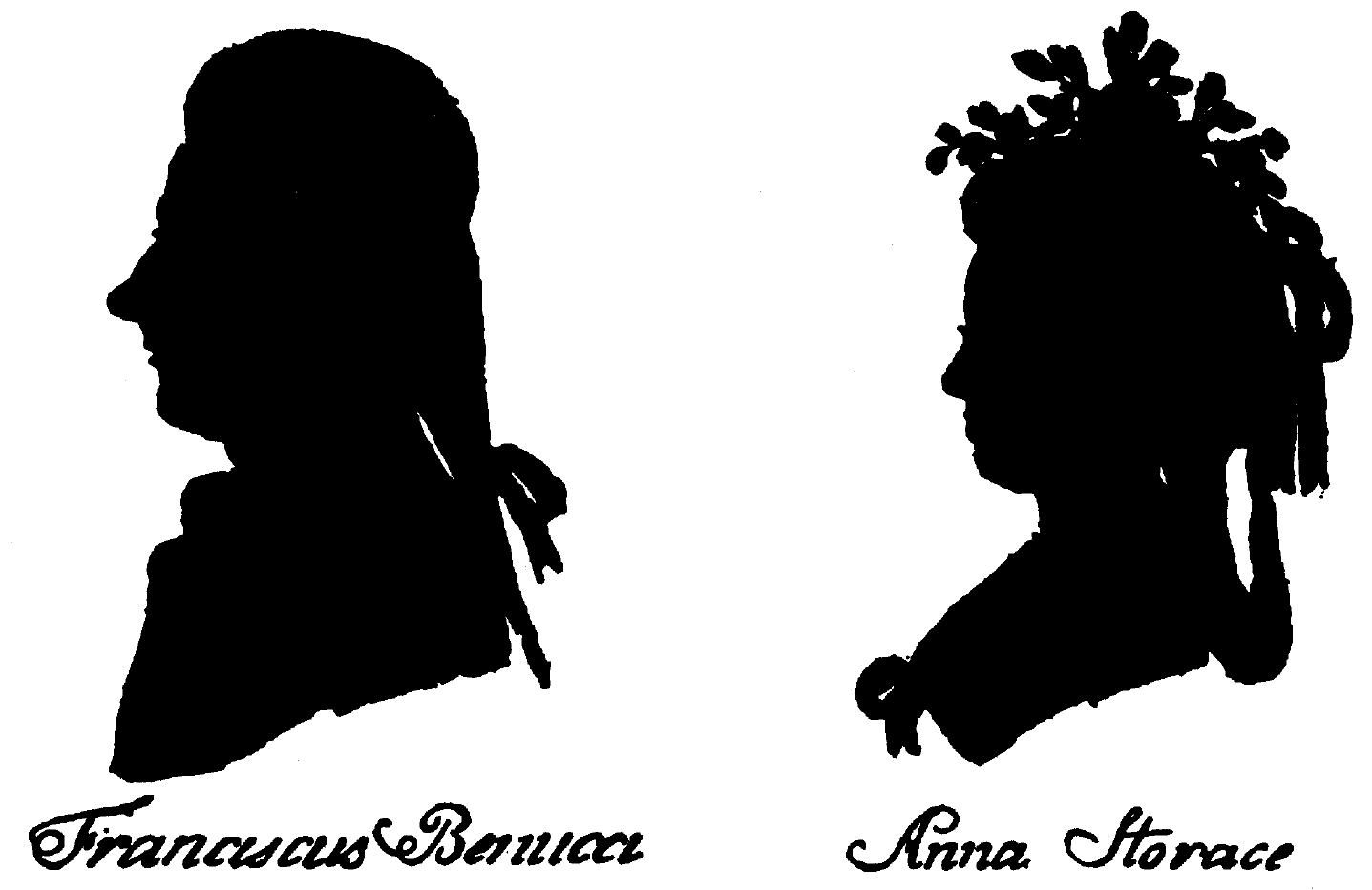
Silhouette of Francesco Benucci and Nancy Storace by Hieronymus Löschenkohl (1786)

The new company opened 2 April 1783 with a performance of Antonio Salieri's La scuola de' gelosi; Benucci took the buffo role of Blasio. This opera was an immediate success, with over 25 performances, and a critic wrote, "the buffo is so natural that he is regarded as the best ever seen here. The others are not worth mentioning." Mozart evidently attended, and on 7 May wrote home to his father Leopold, "The Italian opera buffa has started up here again and is proving very popular. The buffo is particularly good, he's called Benucci."

Benucci continued with the Emperor's company for a total of twelve years. Among other roles he played:

- Rosmondo in Gli sposi malcontenti by Stephen Storace (1785)
- Trofonio in La grotta di Trofonio by Salieri (1785)
- Tita in Una cosa rara by Martín y Soler (1786)
- Axur in Axur, re d'Ormus by Salieri (1788)

His participation in the company appears to have been so important that it would not have survived without him. On 7 June 1783, the Emperor wrote to the theater director, Count Franz Orsini-Rosenberg, "Since it appears to me that the singer Benucci finds favor with the public, I would like you to try to convince him to stay until Easter and then for one year further; if he agrees to this in a new contract, and if Storace, who also is liked by the public, says, then you can keep the best from among the rest of the troupe; if Benucci and Storace do not stay, then the others need not be kept on."

During his earlier years in Vienna Benucci also performed in private concerts in collaboration with Nancy Storace. The diarist Count Zinzendorf noted that each singer served as the other's keyboard accompanist.

Twice during his tenure in Vienna Benucci traveled to perform elsewhere. In 1783 he visited Rome to fulfil a commitment already made when he had been hired at Vienna; his "enormous popularity" there (Link) was witnessed by the Emperor, traveling there at the time. In August 1788, the Emperor, having launched an expensive and futile war with Turkey, proposed to abolish his Italian opera company. On hearing this, Benucci asked for leave and obtained an engagement at the King's Theatre in London, where he performed with Storace, who had returned there in February 1787. He achieved only mixed success. One opera in which Benucci and Storace appeared was La vendemmia by Giuseppe Gazzaniga. They interpolated into it a performance of a duet from The Marriage of Figaro, "Crudel! perche finora". Benucci returned to Vienna in the same year, as the emperor had relented of his decision to abolish the company.

=== Mozart roles ===
Mozart had no affiliation with the Emperor's Italian opera company and had to work for some time before he could get an opera commission. A failed early effort was the fragment Lo sposo deluso (1783), for which he wrote five numbers before abandoning the project. The marginal notes in the score indicate that Mozart was writing with specific singers in mind, including Benucci.

In the years that followed, three completed operas by Mozart were performed by the Emperor's Italian company. All three number among the composer's most celebrated works, and Benucci took an important role in each.

In the premiere of The Marriage of Figaro (1786), Benucci performed the title role; Storace played his betrothed Susanna. The rehearsals for this work gave rise to an anecdote related by the tenor Michael Kelly (who was in the cast) in his 1824 memoirs, attesting to Mozart's esteem for Benucci:

I remember Mozart was on the stage with his crimson pelisse and gold laced cocked hat giving the time of the music to the orchestra. Figaro's song, "Non piu andrai, farfallone amoroso" Benucci gave with the greatest animation and power of voice. I was standing close to Mozart who, sotto voce, was repeating' 'Bravo, bravo! Benucci;' and when Benucci came to the fine passage 'Cherubino, alla vittoria, alla gloria militar,' which he gave out with stentorian lungs, the effect was electricity itself, for the whole of the performers on the stage and those in the orchestra, as if actuated by one feeling of delight, vociferated 'Bravo! bravo! maestro. Viva! viva grande Mozart!

The "electric" moment involved a rising major third near the top of Benucci's range, a musical gesture that Link sees as having been later repeated in other music composed for Benucci, by Mozart as well as Salieri.

Don Giovanni (1787) was premiered not in Vienna but in Prague. For the subsequent Vienna premiere (1788) Benucci took the role of Leporello. Mozart wrote three new numbers for the Vienna version, including the duet "Per quelle tue manine", K. 540b, which Benucci performed with the soprano Luisa Laschi-Mombelli.

Così fan tutte premiered in 1790; Benucci performed the role of Guglielmo. The high standing of Benucci, both within the company and in Mozart's own estimation, led to difficulties in the composition of the opera. Mozart's original version included a long and elaborate first-act aria for Benucci, "Rivolgete a lui lo sguardo", K. 584, which ultimately had to be discarded as dramatically inappropriate. In what Woodfield calls a "drastic step" it was replaced by the more lightweight "Non siate retrosi". Woodfield suggests that it may have been in compensation that Mozart altered Benucci's second act aria, the flamboyant "Donne mie", adding new musical material and parts for trumpets and timpani.

=== Later life ===
Benucci continued in the Italian opera in Vienna until 1795. His greatest success during this period was in Il matrimonio segreto by Domenico Cimarosa (1792). He performed at La Scala in Milan in 1795, in operas by Giuseppe Sarti and by Angelo Tarchi. He returned to Livorno in 1797, and eventually stopped performing around 1800. He died in Florence 5 April 1824.

== Assessment ==
In 1793 a critic for the Berliner Musikalische Zeitung wrote:

Benucci, one of the premier buffos in opera buffa, combines unaffected, excellent acting with an exceptionally round, beautiful, and full bass voice. He is as much a complete singer as a choice actor. He has a rare habit that few Italian singers share: he never exaggerates. Even when he brings his acting to the highest extremes, he maintains propriety and secure limits, which hold him back from absurd, vulgar comedy. I like him particularly in the opera Il matrimonio segreto. He acts and sings the role of the Count in a masterly fashion. I wouldn't have believed that, in spite of being a comedian, he nonetheless still manages to portray Axur by Salieri in a rather serious manner.

The modern scholar Christopher Raeburn describes Benucci thus:

He had a round, beautifully full voice, more bass than baritone; probably he was the finest artist for whom Mozart wrote, and as a buffo outshone his contemporaries as singer and actor.
