= No Song, No Supper =

1790 opera by Stephen Storace

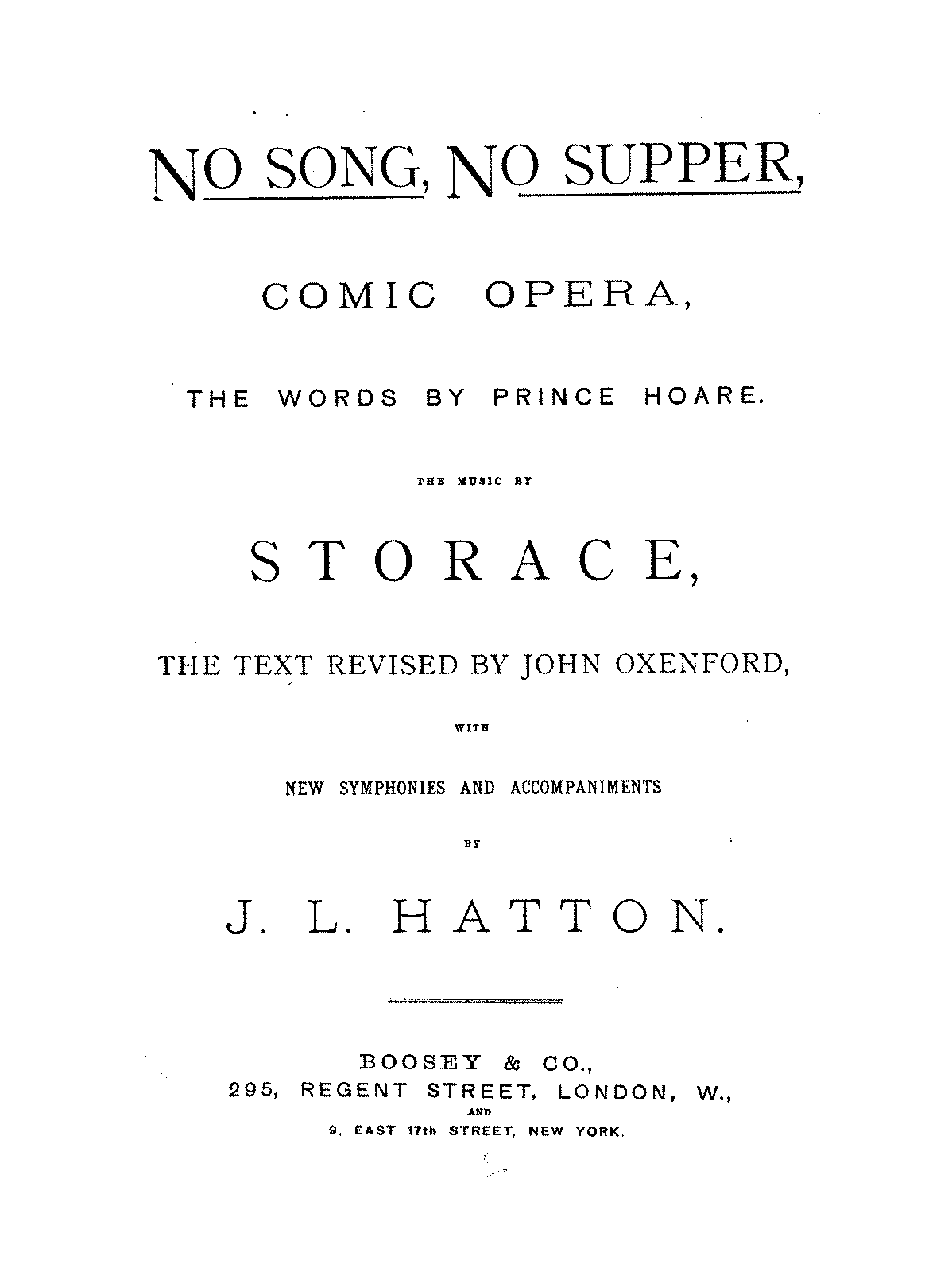
Piano reduction by John Liptrot Hatton, published in the 1880s

No Song, No Supper is an opera with music by Stephen Storace to a libretto by Prince Hoare.

No Song, No Supper is an operatic afterpiece which is the first of Storace's five collaborations with Hoare. Its premiere was at the Drury Lane Theatre in London, on April 16, 1790.

The piece was first given as a part of a benefit evening for Michael Kelly. He took the role of Frederick, with Nancy Storace taking the role of Margaretta, a role which she was also to sing at her farewell performance in 1808. It was immediately put into the Drury Lane repertoire and remained popular during Storace's lifetime.

== Plot ==
- Act 1
- Scene 1

Having been cast ashore from a shipwreck, Frederick is glad to be alive ("The lingering pangs of hopeless love, condemn'd"). He sees his shipmate Robin who recognize that they have landed on the shore of Cornwall within the vicinity of Robin's brother-in-law, George Crop, "an honest farmer." At mention of the name, Frederick realizes that Crop is also the father of his lover, Louisa. Robin explains that Crop married his sister, since deceased, and is now married to another wife. William and other shipmates reveal that nothing has been salvages from the ship and they will stand watch while Frederick and Robin go to Crop.

Robin reveals to Frederick that he went to see to escape a lawyer who took property Robin had wanted to give to Louisa. Frederick reveals that he went to sea on a ruse: he pretended to be poor so that Louisa would not love him for his money, but the plan backfired: Louisa rejected him because she did not want her family to be burdened by poverty. Robin promises not to reveal Frederick's secret.

- Scene 2

George Crop and his wife Dorothy enter and argue, she complaining ("Go, George, I can't endure you") followed by his complaining ("No care beyond the morrow"). Louisa enters but after a few words Crop scolds his wife for tormenting Louisa, who reflects on their poor relationship ("I thought our quarrels ended"). Crop leaves and Dorothy's servant Nelly enters. The dialogue between the two women reveal that Dorothy is very fond of Mr. Endless who is due at the house before Crop returns.

- Scene 3 - outside of Crop's house

Margaretta enters, singing ("With lowly suit and plaintive ditty"). She reveals that she wanted to marry Robin, but her father refused on account of the potential groom's lack of money. But Margaretta still loves Robin. Nelly and Dorothy enter and tell Margaretta she must leave. Margaretta becomes suspicious at their insistence, and leaves briefly. In her absence, Mr. Endless's servant Thomas delivers bottles of wine to Nelly. Margaretta notices and wonders what is the occasion. Mr. Endless enters and reveals a plan to disposes Crop of the house and take his wife Dorothy. Margaretta exits in such as way as to make Endless take notice.

- Scene 4

Inside the house, Crop and Dorothy argue and agree that the first person to speak shall shut the door. Crop stays silent as Robin and Frederick approach the house. After not receiving any words from Crop, Dorothy speaks up first, causing her to shut the door. Crop tells Robin that Louisa is away but, despite his years at sea, continues to pine for him. Robin is delighted at the confirmation of Louisa's continued affection for him.

- Scene 5 - Act 1, Finale

Crop enters with Robin, Frederick and William, bemoaning their walking ("How often thus, I'm forc'd to trudge"). Margaretta and Dorothy enter and join in singing of how their efforts will be rewarded.

- Act 2
- Scene 1

William leads the sailors in song ("From aloft the sailor looks around"). Robin tells Crop that some of the ship's material has been salvaged; the sailors have hidden in. Meanwhile he still loves Margaretta and hope she feels similarly.

- Scene 2

Margaretta wanders by and is upset at having to make entreaties to a lawyer ("A Miser bid to have and hold me"). She encounters Crop, asking whether she can have lodging for the night.

- Scene 3

Inside of Deborah's Cottage. Deborah, Louisa's grandmother, tells Louisa to forget Frederick, but Louisa says she won't. Frederick enters disguised. He sings to her ("Pretty maid, your fortune's here") and tells her that her Frederick was on a ship that hit a rock. Upset at the news, she faints, at which point Frederick removes the disguise and proves to her that he's still alive. The two are happy that they have been reunited ("Thus every hope obtaining, the doubtful conflict o'er ").

- Scene 4

In Crop's house, Endless and Dorothy are discussing Endless's plan. As Nelly serves dinner there is a knock at the door. It is Crop, and both Dorothy and Nelly rush to hide Endless in a sack and put him with other sacks. Crop enters with Margaretta, wondering what took them so long to answer the door. He asks for dinner but is told there is only cheese. Robin enters happily carrying a keg from the ship which is revealed to be holding a cache of gold ("Three years a sailor's life I led"). Unseen, Margaretta worries that Robin will marry a rich woman, but when Robin reveals he wants to marry Margaretta, she enters. Although there is little food, he encourages to sing a song before dinner and she complies ("Across the Downs this morning"). After the first verse, it is revealed there is lamb, to which Margaretta sings the second verse ("This lamb so blithe as Midsummer"). In singing the third verse ("This monstrous stone, the shepherd flung") Margaretta reveals that Endless is hiding in a sack. Crop finds Endless and throws him out of the house. Crop and Dorothy agree to put their quarreling behind them. Frederick enters with Louisa, now having unmasked himself as affluent and everyone sings optimistically of the future ("Let shepherd lads and maids advance")>

== Roles ==
Role	Voice type	Premiere Cast, April 16, 1790
Frederick	tenor	Michael Kelly
Robin	tenor	John Bannister
Endless	tenor	Richard "Dicky" Suett
George Crop, father of Louisa, brother-in-law of Robin	tenor	Charles Dignum
Thomas	-	Mr. Alfred
William, a shipmate	baritone	Mr. Sedgwick
Margaretta	soprano	Nancy Storace
Louisa	soprano	Anna Maria Crouch
Dorothy	soprano	Maria Bland
Nelly, a servant in the Crop household	-	Ms. Hagley
Deborah	-	Ms. Booth

== Works consulted ==
- Girdham, Jane (2002), "No Song, No Supper", Grove Music Online (Oxford Music Online), Oxford University Press
- Michael Kelly, ed.Herbert van Thal, Solo Recital, London, 1972
