= Luisa Laschi =

Italian operatic soprano

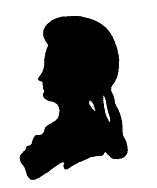
- Silhouette portrait of Laschi by Hieronymus Löschenkohl
- Born: 1760; Florence, Italy
- Died: c.1790
- Other name: Luisa Laschi-Mombelli
- Occupation: opera singer (soprano)

Luisa Laschi, also known as Luisa Laschi-Mombelli, (1760 – c. 1790) was an Italian operatic soprano prominent in the opera houses of Austria and Italy. Amongst the numerous roles she created in her brief but intense career were Countess Almaviva in Mozart's Le nozze di Figaro and Zerlina in his Don Giovanni; Aspasia in Salieri's Axur, re d'Ormus; and Isabella in Martín y Soler's Una cosa rara as well as Amore in the same composer's L'arbore di Diana. Laschi was the first wife of the tenor Domenico Mombelli by whom she had two children, both of whom died in infancy.
