= Madame Ronssecy =

Madame Ronssecy (active 1780-1820) was a French composer and harpist who emigrated to England. Little is known about her, although several of her works for harp were published in the late 18th and early 19th centuries.

After moving to England in the 1790s, Ronssecy taught in London. She bought Sébastien Érard harp #333, as well as several other Érard harps, probably acting as an agent for her students. Her compositions and arrangements for harp were published by S. Straight (London), and included:

- Andantino Variations
- Dirge in Cymbeline (by Venanzio Rauzzini; arranged for harp or piano by Ronssecy)
- Lullaby (by Stephen Storace; arranged for harp with variations by Ronssecy)
- Minuetto Variations (by Jean Baptiste Krumpholtz; variations by Ronssecy)
- Scotch Air Variations
- Scotch Tune Variations
- Shepherds I Have Lost My Love
