= James Cobb (librettist) =

English librettist (1756–1818)

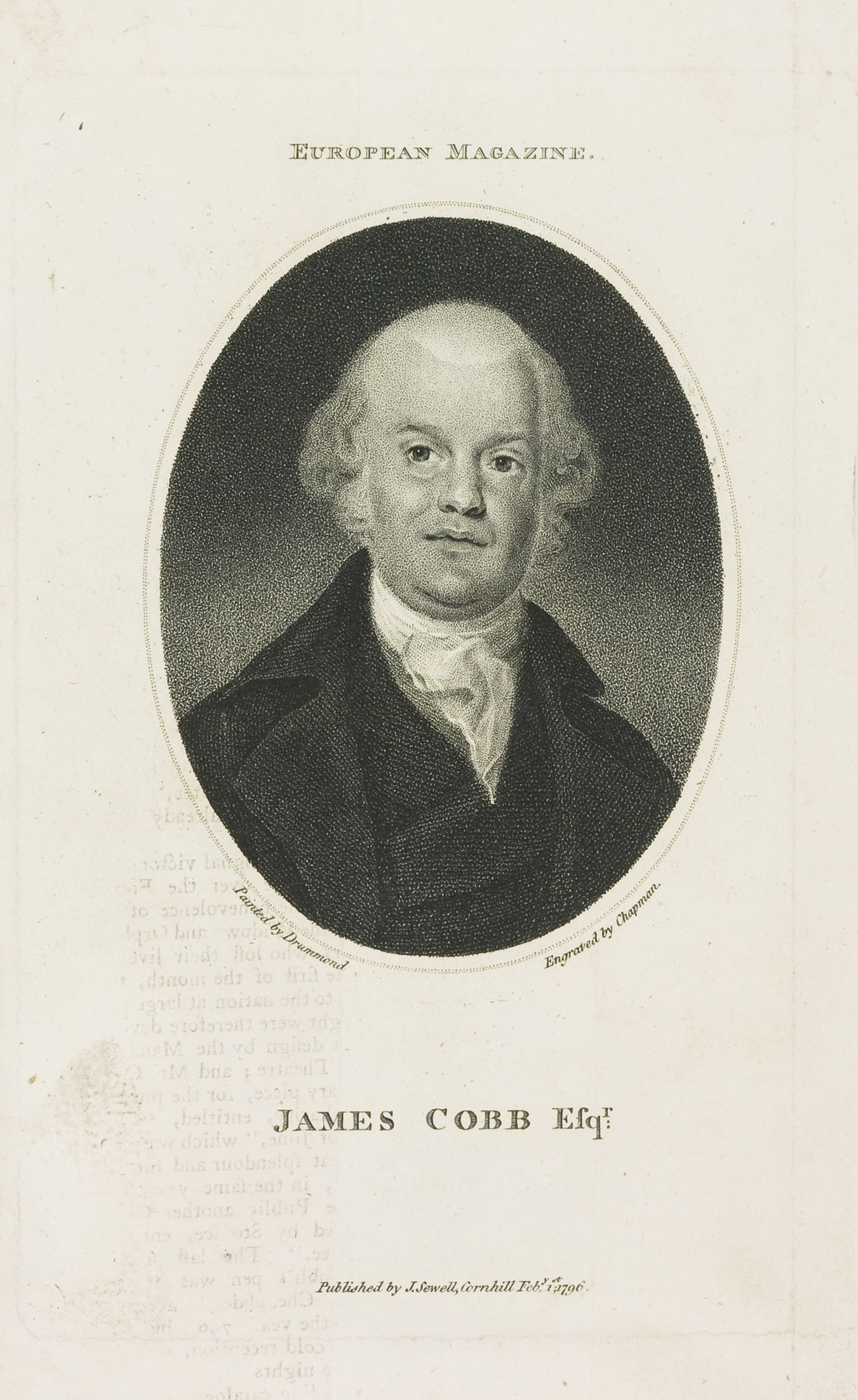
James Cobb

James Cobb (1756–1818) was an English librettist. He provided texts for the opera composers such as Stephen Storace (The Doctor and the Apothecary, The Haunted Tower, The Siege of Belgrade, The Pirates, etc.), and Lord Burghersh.

== Life ==
He entered in 1771 the secretary's office of the East India Company, in which he rose to the post of secretary.

Cobb sent anonymously, for the benefit of Jane Pope (Drury Lane, 30 March 1773), an occasional prologue, which was recited with some slight alteration by David Garrick, to whom it was submitted. For the benefit of the same lady he produced at Drury Lane, on 5 April 1779, his first dramatic piece, 'The Contract, or Female Captain,' which all the popularity of the actors could not galvanise into life, but which under the second title was acted at the Haymarket on 26 August 1780.

This was followed by many operas, farces, preludes, and comedies, most of which are now largely forgotten. Such interest as any of Cobb's pieces possess arises generally from association with actors or composers. In the 'Humourist ' (Drury Lane, §7 April 1785), which owed its production to the application of Burke to Sheridan, John Bannister made a great hit as Dabble, a dentist. This piece was burned in the fire at Drury Lane in 1809. Genest, not too good-naturedly, says that if the whole of Cobb's pieces— about twenty-four in number— had shared the same fate, 'the loss would not have been very great.'

In 'Strangers at Home,' an opera, with music by Linley, Dorothea Jordan is said to have made her first appearance as a singer, and to have played her first original character. 'Doctor and Apothecary,' a two-act musical farce (Drury Lane, 25 Oct. 1788), introduced to the London stage Stephen Storace, from whose 'Singspiele' 'Der Doctor und der Apotheker' performed at Vienna on 11 July 1786, music and plot were taken. 'The Haunted Tower' (Drury Lane, 24 Nov. 1789), also with music by Stephen Storace, served for the debut in English opera of his sister, Anna Selina Storace. It was very successful, and frequently revived.

== Works ==
The works of Cobb which were printed with his sanction are :

- 'Strangers at Home,' comic opera, 8vo, 1786 (Drury Lane, 8 Dec. 1785).
- 'English Readings,' an occasional prologue, 8vo, 1787 (Haymarket, 7 Aug. 1787).
- 'The First Floor,' farce, 8vo, 1787 (Drury Lane, 13 Jan. 1787).
- 'Love in the East,' comic opera, 8vo, 1788 (Drury Lane, 25 Feb. 1788).
- 'Doctor and Apothecary,' musical farce, 8vo, 1788 (see above).
- 'The Haunted Tower' opera, 1789 (Drury Lane, 24 November 1789)
- 'Ramah Droog, or Wine does Wonders,' comic opera, 8vo, 1800 (Covent Garden, 12 Nov. 1798).
- 'A House to be sold,' musical piece in two acts, 8vo, 1802 (Drury Lane, 17 Nov. 1802). This is a clumsy expansion of 'Maison a vendre,' a one-act opera of Duval, with music by D'Aleyrac, played in 1800.
- 'The Wife of Two Husbands,' musical drama, 8vo, 1803 (Drury Lane, 1 Nov. 1803), a translation of 'La Femme a deux Maris' of Guilbert de Pixrcourt, Paris, 1803. Surreptitious editions were issued of (10) the 'Cherokee,' opera, 1795, 8vo (Drury Lane, 20 Dec. 1796).
- 'Paul and Virginia,' musical drama, 12mo, 1801 (Covent Garden, 1 May 1800).
- 'Siege of Belgrade,' comic opera, 12mo, 1792 (Drury Lane, 1 Jan. 1791), and other works.
- 'The Pirates,' comic opera in three acts (Drury Lane company at Haymarket, 21 Nov. 1792),
- The Shepherdess of Cheapside,' musical farce (Drury Lane, 20 Feb. 1796)
- 'Wedding Night,' musical farce (Haymarket, 12 Aug. 1760 ?).
- 'Who'd have thought it ?' farce (Covent Garden, 28 April 1781).
- 'Kensington Gardens, or the Walking Jockey,' prelude (Haymarket, 22 Aug. 1791?), unmentioned by Genest.
- 'Hurly Burly,' a pantomime (Drury Lane, 1785-6). In this Cobb was assisted by Thomas King the comedian.
- 'Poor Old Drury,' prelude (Haymarket, by the Drury Lane company, 22 Sept. 1791).
- 'The Algerine Slaves,' a musical entertainment abridged from 'The Strangers at Home,' and given at the Haymarket Opera House in 1792.
- 'Algonah,' a comic opera (Drury Lane, 30 April 1802).
- 'Sudden Arrivals; or Too Busy by Half,' a comedy (Lyceum, by Drury Lane company, 19 Dec. 1809), making, with ' The Contract ' and ' The Humourist ' mentioned above, twenty-four works.

Besides the composers previously named, Joseph Mazzinghi, Kelly, and Dr. Arnold supplied music to Cobb's pieces. In Gifford's 'Mseviad' Cobbe (sic) is mentioned in contemptuous terms.

== Family ==
Cobb married in 1800 Miss Stanfell of Fratton, Hampshire, and died in 1818.
