= Una cosa rara =

Opera by Vicente Martín y Soler

- Opera by Vicente Martín y Soler
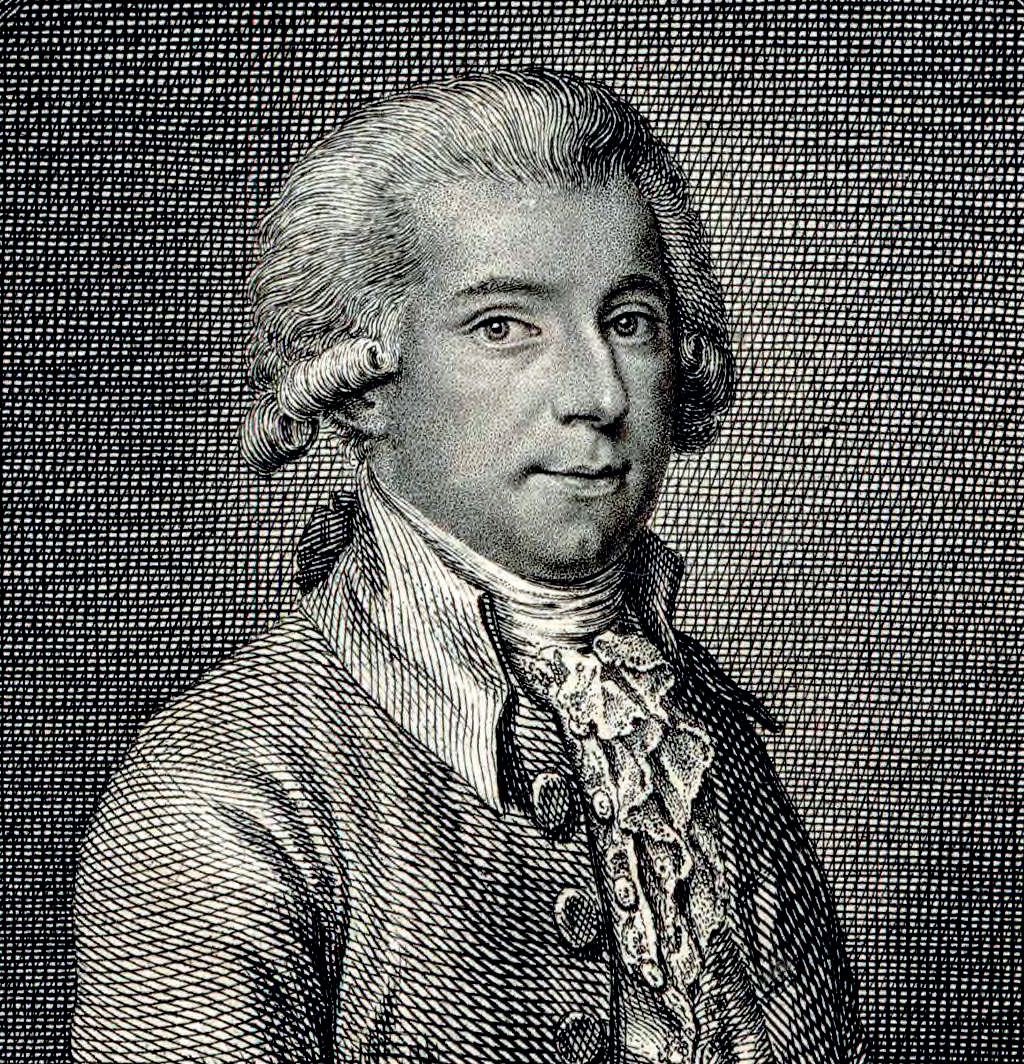
- Vicente Martín y Soler
- Librettist: Lorenzo Da Ponte
- Premiere: 17 November 1786; Burgtheater, Vienna

Una cosa rara, ossia Bellezza ed onestà (A Rare Thing, or Beauty and Honesty) is an opera by the composer Vicente Martín y Soler. It takes the form of a dramma giocoso in two acts. The libretto, by Lorenzo Da Ponte, is based on the play La luna de la sierra by Luis Vélez de Guevara. The opera was first performed at the Burgtheater, Vienna, on 17 November 1786. It was a huge success and was shown 78 times. Mozart quotes a melody from this opera, "O quanto un sì bel giubilo", in the orchestral accompaniment to the trio "Già la mensa è preparata" of the finale of Don Giovanni.

== Roles ==
Roles, voice types, premiere cast
Role	Voice type	Premiere cast 17 November 1786
Isabella, Queen of Spain	soprano	Luisa Laschi-Mombelli
Prince Don Giovanni, Isabella's son	tenor	Vincenzo Calvesi
Corrado, squire	tenor	Michael Kelly
Lilla, a peasant	soprano	Nancy Storace
Ghita, a peasant	soprano	Dorotea Bussani
Tita, betrothed to Ghita	bass	Francesco Benucci
Lubino, betrothed to Lilla	baritone	Stefano Mandini
Lisargo, village mayor	bass	Johann Hoffmann
Chorus of hunters, shepherds and shepherdesses

== Synopsis ==
The town mayor and the Spanish prince Don Giovanni try to seduce the virtuous Lilla, who is engaged to Lubino. The queen finds out and resolves the state of affairs so Lilla is able to marry her beloved.
