= Charles Dignum =

English singer, actor and composer

Charles Dignum (c. 1765 – 29 March 1827) was a popular tenor singer, actor and composer of English birth and Irish parentage who was active in recital, concert and theatre stage, mainly in London, for about thirty years.

== Origins and early training ==
Charles was the son of an Irish Roman Catholic tailor, whose home and business moved from Rotherhithe to Lincoln's Inn Fields during the boy's childhood. He became a chorister in the Sardinian Embassy Chapel in Duke Street, where he was taken on as a vocal pupil by Samuel Webbe, the organist. The boy had plans to enter the church, but was apprenticed by his father to a carver-gilder, with whom, however, he soon fell out, and after some months he articled himself to Thomas Linley the elder, the composer and singing master.

== Career ==
Linley launched him on his public career in spring 1784, at first in the Handel memorial concerts at Westminster Abbey and the Pantheon, and then at Theatre Royal, Drury Lane, where he first appeared as Young Meadows in Love in a Village: 'His figure was rather unfavourable for the part, but his voice was so clear and full-toned, and his manner of singing so judicious, that he was received with great applause.' His next role was Cymon in Michael Arne's opera. In a busy first year he was well-received, appearing in various roles, and made his place alongside many well-established performers. 'On the removal of the elder Bannister to the Royalty Theatre, Dignum succeeded to a caste of parts more suited to his person and his voice, which was a fine tenor. Amongst other characters those of Hawthorn' (Love in a Village) 'and Giles' (The Maid of the Mill) (libretti by Isaac Bickerstaffe, 1762 and 1765 respectively) 'particularly suited him: indeed he was thought superior in them to any actor that had appeared since the days of John Beard, their original representative.' Dignum was the original performer of Crop the miller, in Stephen Storace's No song, no supper, and of Abdalla in Storace's Dido, Queen of Carthage. He was also well known as Tom Tug in Dibdin's The Waterman, in which role there is an illustration of him in the Garrick Club.

His career progressed, principally at Drury Lane, in musical theatre (mainly ballad opera) and pantomime, in lesser roles in Shakespearean theatre. He remained a popular choice in ballad recitals, singing much at Ranelagh Gardens and in taverns: in the summer seasons he continued singing at Vauxhall Gardens until at least 1810. He was specially associated with the songs of James Hook, but also composed and arranged many songs both for his own use and for others to perform.

== Character and fortune ==
He and William Shield, Charles Incledon, Charles Bannister, 'Jack' Johnstone, Charles Ashley and William Parke (oboeist) in 1793 formed themselves into 'The Glee Club', a set which met on Sunday evenings during the season at the Garrick's Head Coffee House in Bow Street, once a fortnight, for singing among themselves and dining together. A project to erect a bust to Dr Thomas Arne, which this group proposed to fund by charitable performances, was vetoed by the management of Covent Garden.

He served on the committee of the Drury Lane Theatrical Fund alongside De Camp, Dowton, Maddox et al.

His obituarist remarked, 'Dignum, with many ludicrous eccentricities, was an amiable, good-natured, jolly fellow.' He married Miss Rennett, the daughter of an attorney, whose fortune helped to sustain them. After her death he suffered a period of 'mental derangement' in misery at her loss, and also suffered from much unhappiness when his granddaughter was kidnapped for a period, for which the offender was prosecuted and transported. A contemporary of the great Michael Kelly, of Charles Incledon and (latterly) of John Braham, he had to work hard for public favour and to withstand attacks referring to his humble origins, his religion and his physical ungainliness (he became quite fat): but, having obtained respect for his skills and good character, he held his place in the affection of his admirers, made large sums at his benefits in later years, and was able to retire with some fortune. He died of inflammation of the lungs in Gloucester Street, London, aged 62 in 1827.

There are various portraits and illustrations of Charles Dignum.
