= Eva Mei =

Italian opera singer (born 1967)

Eva Mei (born 3 March 1967) is an Italian coloratura soprano.

== Life and career ==
Eva Mei was born on 3 March 1967 in Fabriano, Italy. She graduated from the Conservatorio Luigi Cherubini in Florence in 1989. In 1990, at the Mozart Competition in Vienna, she won the Catarina Cavalieri Prize for her interpretation of Konstanze in Mozart's Die Entführung aus dem Serail, an award which led to a contract with the Vienna State Opera where she performed later that same year. She had previously made her professional opera debut in 1989 as Aspasia in Antonio Salieri's Axur, re d'Ormus at the opera house in Siena.

Mei has performed the role of Donna Anna in Don Giovanni with the Zurich Opera and the Dutch National Opera. She made her debut at the Hungarian State Opera House as the Queen of the Night in The Magic Flute, and her first performance at the Teatro Carlo Felice in Genoa was as Musetta in La bohème. At the Berlin State Opera she performed the role of Violetta in La traviata, and at the Bavarian State Opera she portrayed Norina in Don Pasquale.

In 1992 Mei appeared as the soprano soloist in Ludwig van Beethoven's Missa solemnis at the Salzburg Festival. In 1993 she made her debuts at La Scala as Amenaide in Tancredi, and as the Queen of the Night at the Royal Opera House, Covent Garden. She returned to the latter opera house as Mozart's Konstanze. Other theatres she has performed with on the international stage include the Rossini Opera Festival in Pesaro (1996) and the Opera Nomori in Tokyo.

In 1994, Mei performed in Norma as Adalgisa alongside Jane Eaglen in the title role conducted by Riccardo Muti at the Ravenna Festival.

In February 2011, she sang the part of Pamina in a new production of The Magic Flute premiered at the Vorarlberger Landestheater.

She has worked with the conductors Roberto Abbado, Bruno Campanella, Nikolaus Harnoncourt, and Zubin Mehta.

Mei's discography includes the operas Don Pasquale, I Capuleti e i Montecchi, Norma, Tancredi, and Il re pastore. She has also recorded arias by Bellini, Donizetti and Rossini. He concert repertoire recordings include Beethoven's Missa solemnis, Handel's cantatas, and Pergolesi's Stabat Mater.

== Recordings ==
- Thaïs by Massenet: Eva Mei, Michele Pertusi. La Fenice, Venice (2004) (video)
