= Suzanne Murphy =

Irish soprano

Suzanne Murphy (born 15 October 1941) is an Irish soprano.

== Life and career ==
Suzanne Murphy was born in Limerick on 15 October 1941. She began her career working as a folk singer before training as a classical soprano at the Dublin College of Music. She made her professional debut at the Irish National Opera in La Cenerentola. In 1976 she became a resident soprano at the Welsh National Opera (WNO). Repertoire she performed with the WNO includes Alice Ford in Falstaff, Elvira in Ernani and the title roles in Lucia di Lammermoor and Norma.

Murphy provided vocals for the soundtrack to the 1984 film Amadeus. In 1987 she made her debut at the Vienna State Opera as Electra in Idomeneo, and in 1988 she performed Alice Ford at the Royal Opera House, Covent Garden. She sang this latter role again in 1989 at both La Scala and the New York City Opera (NYCO). She performed the roles of both Amelia in Un ballo in maschera and Bellini's Norma with both the NYCO and the Bavarian State Opera.

She is a founder-director of Opera Collective Ireland. As of 2020, she teaches singing at the Royal Welsh College of Music and Drama.
