= Anna Maria Crouch =

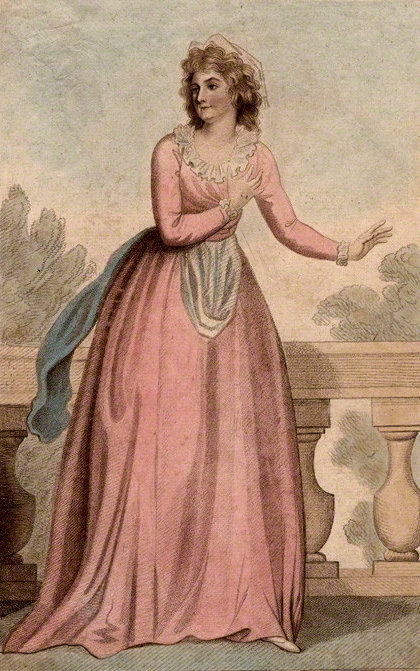
Anna Maria Crouch.

Anna Maria Crouch (20 April 1763 – 2 October 1805), often referred to as Mrs Crouch, was a singer and stage actress in the London theatre. She was (briefly) a mistress of George, Prince of Wales.

== Biography and stage career ==
Born Anna Maria Phillips, she first went on stage as a child, acting and singing. Articled to Thomas Linley, she made her debut at Drury Lane theatre in 1780 as Mandane in Thomas Arne's Artaxerxes, and became a principal in the regular company of the theatre under the management of Sheridan and Linley. In 1781, she made a great success as the heroine in Charles Dibdin's Lionel and Clarissa. She was a notable Ophelia, Olivia and Celia. Her Polly Peachum in The Beggar's Opera was well known. In 1787, her stage partnership began with the Irish actor and singer, Michael Kelly, on his arrival in London with Stephen and Nancy Storace from the Viennese court.

== Marriage and affair ==
In 1784 she had married a naval lieutenant named Crouch. In 1790 she was at Brighton to perform at the opening of the Duke Street Theatre. By 1791, her marriage was suffering, and she was deeply involved in an affair with Kelly. However, this did not prevent her from entering into an affair with the Prince of Wales, occurring while he was living with Maria Anne Fitzherbert. The affair was brief, but she benefited financially, with the general belief being that she received somewhere in the amount of 10,000 pounds from the Prince when the affair ended. Following her marital separation from Crouch in 1791, her domestic partnership with Michael Kelly became generally known.

She died suddenly, of unknown causes, on 2 October 1805, while in Brighton. There are reports that indicate that her death was possibly as a result of a carriage accident. She is buried at St Nicholas of Myra Church, Brighton, where a monument provided by Michael Kelly commemorates her. The monument has been documented and photographed as part of the Historic England, Images of England project.

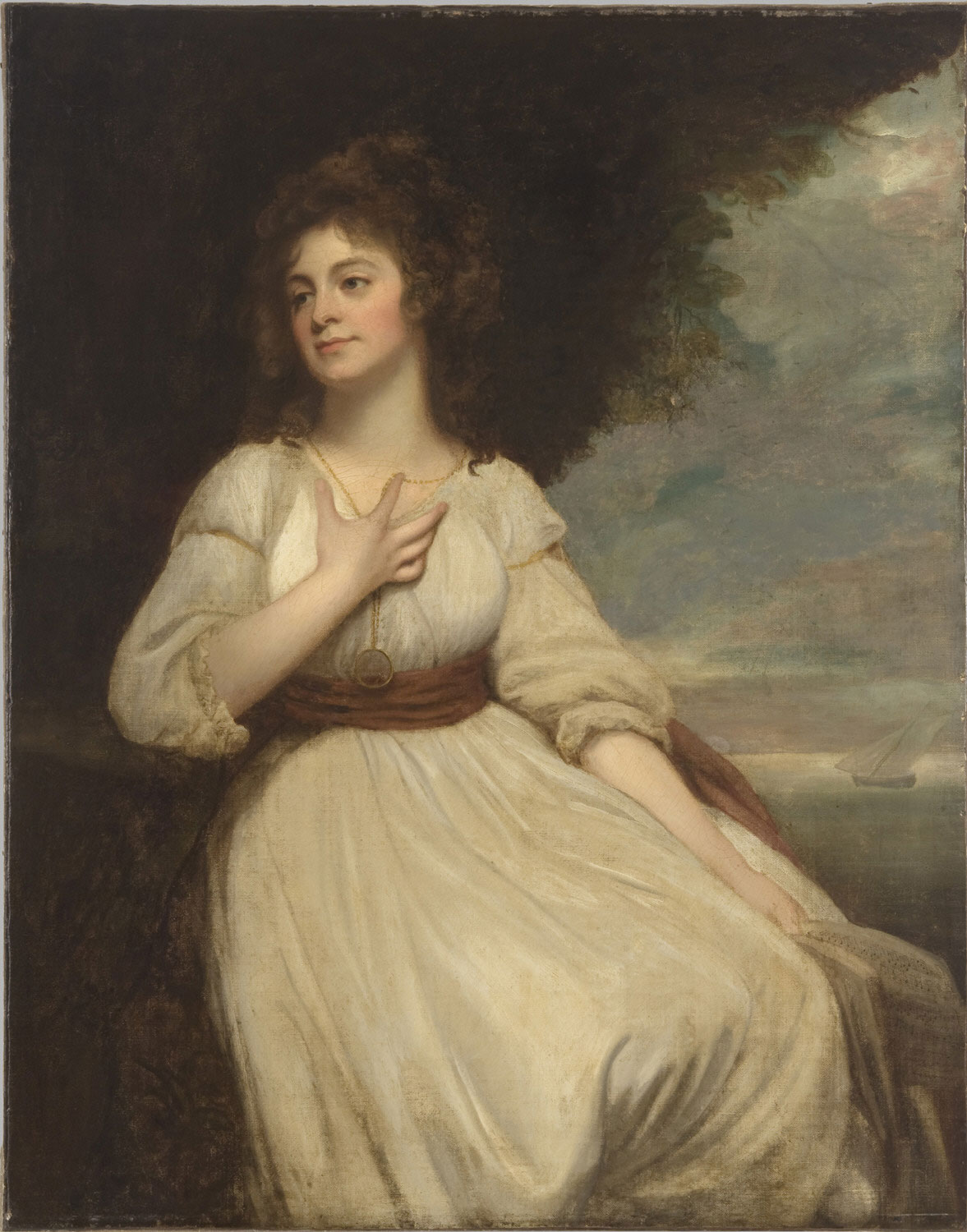
