= Nancy Storace =

English operatic soprano

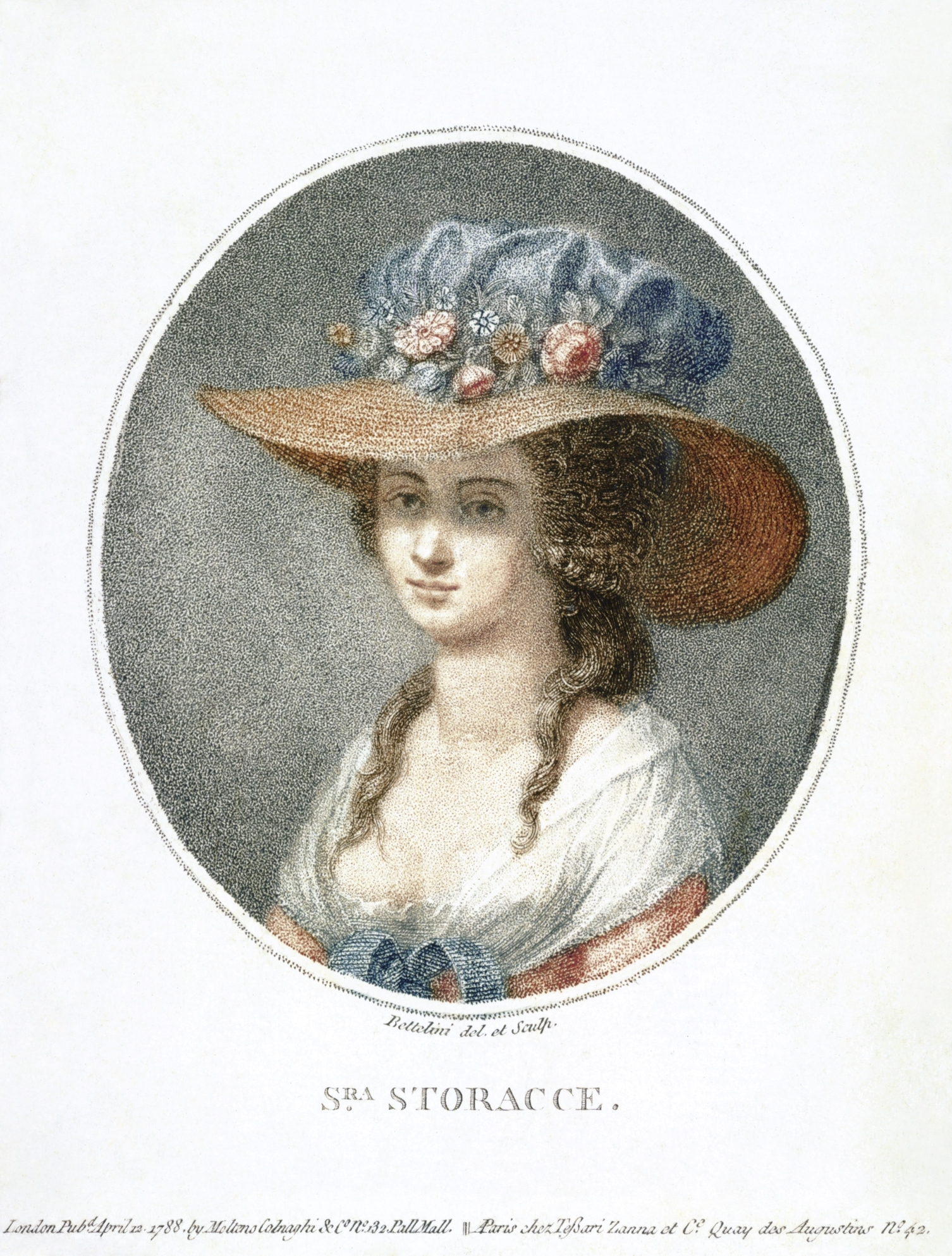
Portrait of Nancy Storace, circa 1788 by Pietro Bettelini. Retouched version; click for original.

Anna (or Ann) Selina Storace (Italian: [stoˈraːtʃe];27 October 1765 – 24 August 1817), known professionally as Nancy Storace, was an English operatic soprano. The role of Susanna in Mozart's Le nozze di Figaro (The Marriage of Figaro) was written for and first performed by her.

Born in London, she began her singing career as a child prodigy in England by the age of 12. This led to further study in Italy and to a successful singing career there during the late 1770s. While in Monza (or shortly before in Milan) in 1782, she was recruited to form part of Emperor Joseph II's new Italian opera company in Vienna, where the assembled singers who joined her "created in the two years leading up to the premiere of The Marriage of Figaro, were welded into the finest buffa ensemble anywhere."

In Vienna, she befriended both Mozart and Joseph Haydn. A sudden failure of her voice in 1785 caused her to withdraw from the stage for five months; though her career continued to be successful, she never fully recovered her former vocal prowess. After marrying in 1784, she left Vienna in 1787 and returned to London, where she continued her career, notably singing in her brother Stephen Storace's operas. She remained in London, but by 1808 had retired from the stage. She died in 1817.

== Ancestry and childhood ==
Nancy Storace's mother was Elizabeth Trusler, the daughter of a pastry cook and the proprietor of Marylebone Gardens. Her father was Stefano Storace, an Italian who had emigrated to Ireland in 1750 and worked there as a double bass player until 1756. By 1759 he was performing in London; a reviewer called him "the first performer of his time on the double-bass". Storace also translated opera libretti from Italian into English, and arranged music for performance. Their older child Stephen Storace, who also achieved fame as a musician, was born in 1762.

Nancy Storace was born 1765 in London. She was a child prodigy: she first performed in public in Southampton in 1773; in April 1774 she made her first London appearance at the Haymarket Theatre. She studied voice with the celebrated castrato Venanzio Rauzzini and premiered the role of Cupido in Rauzzini's opera L'ali d'amore on 29 February 1776.

== Italy ==
In 1778, Storace travelled to Naples in the company of her parents; her older brother Stephen was already there studying composition. She studied in Venice under Antonio Sacchini. The visit to Italy became an extended one as Storace embarked on a very successful career there, singing at first minor roles, then major ones. The composer Giuseppe Sarti wrote his opera Fra i due litiganti il terzo gode (1782, Milan) specifically for her; it achieved great success. Shortly afterwards, Storace was recruited for Vienna along with the outstanding basso buffo Francesco Benucci. Storace as the prima donna and Benucci, who was also singing with her, were offered high salaries, over 4000 florins.

While in Italy, Storace met the Irish tenor Michael Kelly, who was for a long time her colleague as well as a friend. Kelly mentions her frequently in his memoirs.

The skill and self-confidence of the young soprano is illustrated by an oft-repeated anecdote told by Kelly:

She was very well liked, and afterward went to Florence, where the celebrated soprano singer, Marchesi, [a castrato] was engaged at the Pergola theatre. He was then in his prime, and attracted not only all Florence, but I may say all Tuscany. Storace was engaged to sing second woman in his operas; and to the following circumstance, well known all over the Continent, did she owe her sudden elevation in her profession. Bianchi had composed the celebrated cavatina 'Semianza amabile del mio bel sole', which Marchesi sung with the most ravishing taste; in one passage he ran up a voletta of semitone octaves, the last of which he gave with such exquisite power and strength, that it was ever after called 'La Bomba di Marchesi!' Immediately after this song, Storace had to sing one, and was determined to bring a bomba into the field also. She attempted it, and executed it, to the admiration and astonishment of the audience, but to the dismay of poor Marchesi. Campigli, the manager, requested her to discontinue it, but she peremptorily refused, saying that she had as good a right to shew the power of her bomba as any body else. The contention was brought to a close by Marchesi's declaring that if she did not leave the company, he would; and unjust as it was, the manager was obliged to dismiss her, and engage another lady, who was not so ambitious of exhibiting a bomba.

Goldovsky suggests that in such exploits Storace was "planting the seeds" of later vocal trouble:

As any singing teacher will tell you, a fifteen or sixteen-year-old girl sustaining extremely high tones "with exquisite power and strength" is likely, sooner or later, to injure her vocal cords.

== Vienna ==
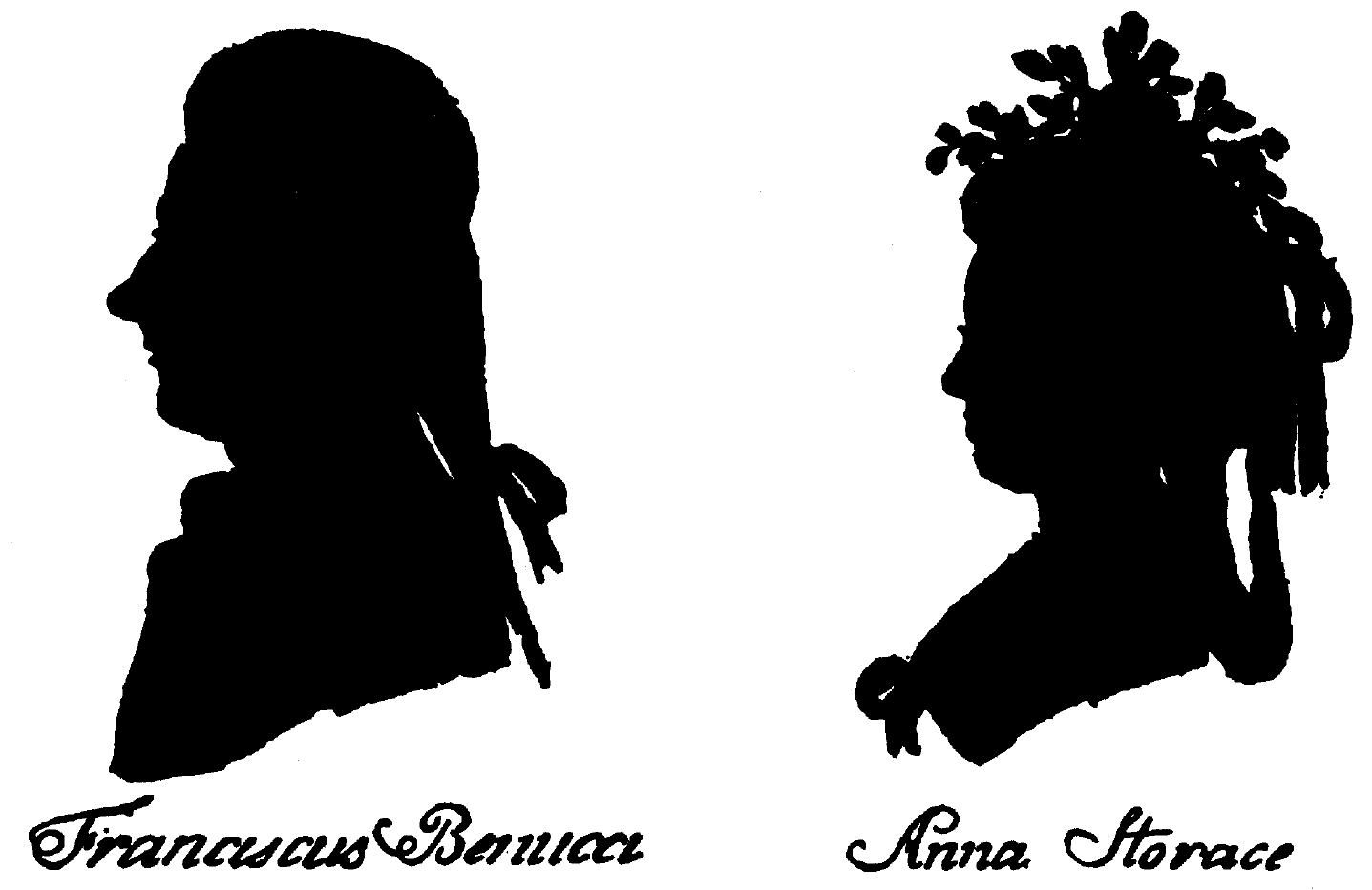
Silhouette of Francesco Benucci and Anna Storace by Hieronymous Loeschenkohl, from Oesterreichischer National Taschenkalender, Vienna 1786-1787

In 1783 the Austrian Emperor Joseph II founded a new opera company specialising in Italian opera buffa. At the time Storace was singing at the Teatro San Samuele in Venice. Count Giacomo Durazzo, who was both an experienced former theatre director and the Emperor's ambassador, engaged Michael Kelly, as he states in his Reminiscences. With further recruitment like the librettist Lorenzo Da Ponte an outstanding ensemble was formed.

=== Vienna performances ===
According to Dorothea Link, Storace performed in about 20 operas during her stay in Vienna. She sang in several world premieres in 1780s, including Susanna in Mozart's Le nozze di Figaro (with Francesco Benucci in the title role), the Countess in Salieri's La scuola de' gelosi (also with Benucci) and Angelica in Vicente Martín y Soler's Il burbero di buon cuore.

Storace seems often to have made a powerful impression on audience members. Hunter describes and quotes the diary of Count Karl von Zinzendorf, a government official who regularly attended the theater in Storace's time.

[His] 1783 comments about Nancy Storace as Dorina in Fra i due litiganti seem astonishingly unguarded: "Storace played [the role] like an angel. Her beautiful eyes, her white neck, her beautiful throat, her fresh mouth, made a charming effect." His 1787 comments on the duet, "Pace, caro mio sposo," in Una cosa rara suggest comparable enthusiasm for the music Storace sang: "I find the duo between Mandini and Storace so tender and so expressive that it poses a danger to the young members of the audience. One needs to have had some experience in order to see it with a cool head".

After Storace left Vienna in 1787, Zinzendorf's diary entries repeatedly express regret that later sopranos could not live up to her performances.

The Hungarian poet Ferenc Kazinczy attended a performance of The Marriage of Figaro and later remembered the powerful impression the work made on him, mentioning Storace in particular:

Storace, the beautiful singer, enchanted eye, ear, and soul. – Mozart directed the orchestra, playing his fortepiano; the joy which this music causes is so far removed from all sensuality that one cannot speak of it. Where could words be found that are worthy to describe such joy?

=== Friendships with Haydn and Mozart ===
Storace was on friendly terms with both Mozart and Joseph Haydn. Mozart had been living and working in Vienna since 1781; Haydn enjoyed his visits to Vienna but was compelled by his employment with Prince Nikolaus Esterházy to spend most of his time at Esterháza, Hungary, and Eisenstadt, Austria.

Storace sang in Haydn's oratorio Il ritorno di Tobia in March 1784. Haydn later visited Storace with her brother Stephen in their home and played chamber music. He also wrote a cantata "for the voice of my dear Storace", thought to be Miseri noi, H. XXIVa.

Storace would have worked closely with Mozart on The Marriage of Figaro, which premiered in Vienna on 1 May 1786; it is possible that her lively acting style was the inspiration for the central character of Susanna. Mozart evidently made on-the-spot changes to the vocal part in response to Storace's special needs. Author Piero Melograni, expanding on earlier claims of musicologist Alfred Einstein, suggested that Mozart and Storace may have had a love affair.

When she was about to leave Vienna, Storace performed in a farewell concert on 23 February 1787. For this occasion Mozart wrote the concert recitative and aria "Ch'io mi scordi di te? [...] Non temer, amato bene" for her. The work, which is headed "Recitativo con Rondò. Composto per la Sigra: storace / dal suo servo ed amico W: A: Mozart. / viena li 26 / di decbr: 786", is a duet for soprano and piano with orchestra which, in view of Mozart's note in his own thematic catalogue ("Scena con Rondò mit klavierSolo. für Mad:selle storace und mich."), was very likely performed by her, with Mozart himself playing the piano part, at her farewell concert. In 2011 the British composer Peter Seabourne was commissioned by Staatsorchester Rheinische Philharmonie to write an orchestral work Tu Sospiri taking words from this concert aria as a starting point.

=== Failure of her voice ===
On 1 June 1785, Storace suffered a catastrophic failure of her voice during a performance of her brother's opera Gli sposi malcontenti ("The unhappily married couple"). Kelly describes the event in his memoirs:

A new opera, composed by Stephen Storace, was produced... Signora Storace and myself had the two principal parts in it. In the middle of the first act, Storace all at once lost her voice, and could not utter a sound during the whole of the performance; this naturally threw a damp over the audience, as well as the performers. The loss of the first female singer, who was a great and deserved favourite, was to the composer, her brother, a severe blow. I never shall forget her despair and disappointment, but she was not then prepared for the extent of her misfortune, for she did not recover her voice sufficiently to appear on stage for five months.

In Autumn 1785 Mozart collaborated with Antonio Salieri (in whose operas Storace also performed) and an unknown composer, Cornetti, on a short cantata entitled Per la ricuperata salute di Ofelia, celebrating Storace's return to the stage. The cantata was believed to be lost until its discovery in November 2015 by musicologist and composer Timo Jouko Herrmann while doing research on Salieri in the collections of the Czech Museum of Music.

Even after the five months absence was over, Storace's voice was apparently far from fully recovered. Goldovsky recounts the subterfuges that both Salieri and Mozart engaged in to make it possible for the recovering soprano to take major roles in their operas; Mozart in particular rewrote passages of The Marriage of Figaro at lower pitch to help Storace get through her performances. Modern performances use the pitch values assigned by Mozart to later sopranos in the Prague and Vienna revival performances.

== England ==
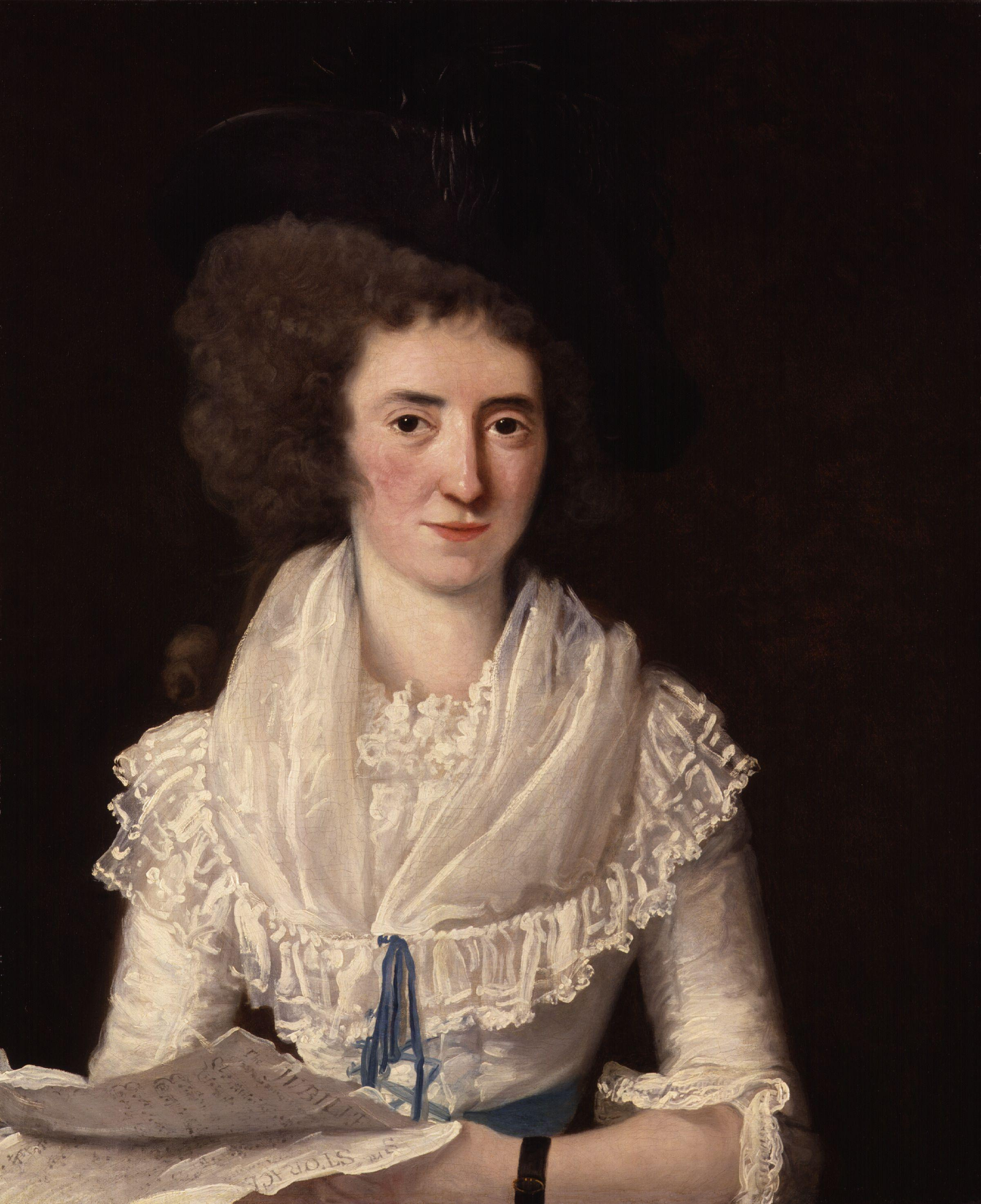
Nancy Storace, c. 1790, by Benjamin van der Gucht (1753–1794)

In 1787 she returned to England, where she first appeared at the King's Theatre in London that year. In fact, she hoped to return to Vienna for the 1788 Easter season, but the Emperor's opera budget would no longer permit it, as he had embarked on an expensive war with Turkey.

She contributed greatly to the success of her brother Stephen Storace's operas, including The Haunted Tower and The Siege of Belgrade, and she also appeared at the Handel Commemoration in Westminster Abbey in 1791 and numerous concerts.

In 1791, Joseph Haydn arrived in London on the first of his two visits there, during which he achieved wealth and fame and for which composed his twelve London symphonies. Storace resumed her friendship and collaboration with Haydn at this time. She appeared in the first two of the Salomon concerts that featured Haydn's music. She also sang in the ninth and eleventh concerts as well as in the benefit concert for Haydn, and in the concert that celebrated the awarding of an honorary doctorate to Haydn by the University of Oxford. She also performed in concerts with Haydn during his second visit in 1794/1795.

== Personal life ==
On 29 March 1784, Storace was married to John Abraham Fisher, a 40-year-old composer and violinist. The marriage went badly, as Fisher abused and may have beaten her. In his memoirs Michael Kelly, who was Storace's friend, wrote "it was said he had a very striking way of enforcing his opinion." Word of this got to the Emperor, who was heavily involved in running his opera company, and he ordered Fisher to leave Vienna. Fisher complied, moving to Ireland. Storace was pregnant with a child which was born on 30 January 1785; this daughter, Josepha Fisher, died on 17 July 1785.

At a time when a divorce required an Act of Parliament, Storace remained married to Fisher, although separated from him, until his death in 1806, so could not have married again before that.

By 1796, Storace had begun a long liaison with the tenor John Braham, although they never married. Rumors about their affair first appeared in the English newspapers in May 1796. Their break-up in 1815 was acrimonious and may have contributed to Storace's sudden death the following year; at any rate their son, William Spencer Harris Braham, certainly believed it had. Spencer, who had become an Anglican clergyman and a minor canon of Canterbury Cathedral, years later sought and obtained leave from Queen Victoria to change his family name to Meadows, his petition having been received on the ground that his wife was the sole heir of her maternal grandfather of that name.

In Storace's will, bequeathing property to the amount of £50,000, she styled herself a "spinster", although in the eyes of the law she died a widow. She was survived by her son and her widowed mother.

Storace is buried at St Mary-at-Lambeth (now the Garden Museum), where there is a commemorative plaque.

== Assessment ==
Charles Burney, writing in 1788, reported on one of her performances "though a lively and intelligent actress, and an excellent performer in comic operas, her voice, in spite of all her care, does not favour her ambition to appear as a serious singer. There is a certain crack and roughness . . . [In] airs of tenderness, sorrow, or supplication, there is always reason to lament the deficiency of natural sweetness." Matthews (1969) writes: "Even after her great success in Vienna and her subsequent popularity on the English stage, her voice was said to have had a sort of twang, and it was her vivacity and gift for comedy which made her reputation."
