= Stephen Storace =

English composer

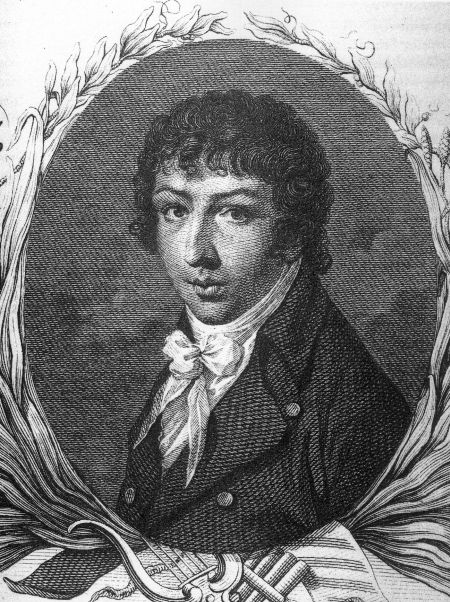
Stephen Storace

Stephen John Seymour Storace (4 April 1762 – 19 March 1796) was an English composer of the Classical era, known primarily for his operas. His sister was the famous opera singer Nancy Storace.

He was born in London in the Parish of St Marylebone to an English mother and Italian father. Relatively little is known through direct records of his life, and most details are known second-hand through the memoirs of his contemporaries Michael Kelly, the actor John Bannister, and the oboist William Thomas Parke.

== Early years: 1762–1780 ==
His father, Stefano Storace (b. Torre Annunziata, ca. 1725; d. London, ca. 1781), an Italian contrabassist and composer, taught him the violin so well that at ten years old he played successfully the most difficult music of the day. The composer's youth was spent entirely in the company of musicians, since his father (also a composer and arranger) was the musical director of Marylebone Gardens. Mistrusting the quality of musical education available in England, Stefano Storace sent his son to Italy to study, at the Conservatorio di Sant' Onofrio, Naples. Stephen neglected his musical studies in Italy, and went on painting expeditions with Thomas Jones. His interest in art may not have been entirely extinguished, however – unlike the works of any of his English contemporaries, the printed vocal scores of all his operas feature elaborate engravings of what are presumed to be the stage-designs, and it is suggested that these drawings were Stephen's own work. No other artist, at least, seems to have claimed credit for them. Towards the end of their studies, Stephen and Nancy first made the acquaintance of Michael Kelly, whom they encountered by chance in Livorno. Kelly was with English-speaking friends, and ventured an opinion (in English) as to whether the young person with Stephen was a boy or a girl. "The person is a she-animal" retorted an offended Nancy in English as the first remark in what would be a lifelong friendship with both the Storaces.

Kelly tells the story with an important difference. He was as thin as a rake, coming from Sicily to Livorno, and with a mass of fair hair, and he had not long ceased singing treble. Nancy and Stephen, whom he did not know, stood together on the Livorno Mole, and Nancy said in English to her brother, 'Look at that girl dressed in boy's clothes." Kelly then astonished her by replying, also in English, 'You are mistaken, Miss; I am a very proper he animal, and quite at your service!'

== Return to England; employment in Vienna: 1780–1787 ==
Stephen Storace returned to England sometime between the years of 1780 and 1782, most likely to settle his father's affairs after his death in Naples, which probably happened around 1780–1781. Nancy, accompanied by her mother, Elizabeth, went to Vienna in January 1783. Nancy entered into an arranged marriage (most likely arranged by her mother) to the English violinist and composer John Fisher in March 1784. The marriage only lasted a few months. It is unclear how Stephen obtained his first commission to compose an Italian opera for the Viennese stage, but the commission was most likely obtained by Nancy sometime in the fall of 1784, with Stephen arriving in Vienna sometime in late December of that same year.

Stephen produced his first opera, Gli sposi malcontenti, at Vienna, on 1 June 1785. The premiere, however, was marred by the failure of his sister's voice. She was singing the prima buffa role and collapsed on-stage in mid-aria, causing the performance to be abandoned. Nancy was pregnant and gave birth to a baby girl a few weeks later. The child was given to a foundling home by Elizabeth Storace, who claimed that it belonged to Nancy's estranged husband, John Fisher, who had been banished by the Emperor some months earlier for beating Nancy. Elizabeth Storace claimed that they did not care if the child lived or died; the child died in the foundling home a month after she was born. Nancy's return to the stage four months later was marked by the performance of Per la ricuperata salute di Ofelia, composed specially for the occasion by a trio of composers – Mozart, Salieri, and the unknown "Cornetti" (which may have been a pen-name for Stephen, Salieri, or even perhaps Emperor Joseph II). This rare example of a Mozart-Salieri collaboration was discovered only in 2016.

In Vienna, the Storaces knew Mozart very well. Nancy sang Susanna at the premiere of Mozart's Le nozze di Figaro, and Kelly sang Don Curzio. Stephen was regularly playing pool with Wolfgang. One interesting anecdote is that at one occasion in 1785 Haydn, Dittersdorf, Mozart and Wanhal played Storace's string quartet, Dittersdorf taking first violin, Haydn second violin, Mozart viola and Wanhal cello. The "English circle" in Vienna also included the composer Thomas Attwood.

Stephen produced a second opera in Vienna, Gli equivoci, founded on Shakespeare's The Comedy of Errors.

== The English Operas: 1787–1796 ==
There is no clear explanation why the Storaces abandoned Vienna at the height of their success there. The reasons are suggested to be more personal than professional. Certainly the emperor spoke of her with great admiration, even using her abilities as an arbitrary unit of currency – "I'd not give you a Storace for it!". Quite possibly Nancy was under pressure from Elizabeth, who was not at all happy in Vienna, and wished to return to England with both of her children in tow. Nancy left Vienna in February 1787, along with her "entourage" of Michael Kelly, her brother, and Thomas Attwood. Buoyed-up by their success on the Viennese stage, the coach-party which left for London could not have imagined they would find themselves rejected and unwanted in London, where their names were quite forgotten after such a long absence. Stephen was remembered – if at all – as an infant prodigy violinist at Vauxhall Gardens, and found it very hard to secure paying work without the cherubic charm of youth behind him, and moreover as an unknown composer.

Both Nancy and Stephen imagined they might find work at the King's Theatre, which was – at that time – the home of the Royal Italian Opera, a troupe which enjoyed a royal monopoly on the presentation of Italian opera, and in fact of any musical works which were through-composed without dialogue. Kelly succeeded in getting a few roles there (on the basis of his wider professional experience, knowing roles the King's Theatre already had in repertoire, and his legendary charm), but both Storaces found themselves excluded by the group of native Italian musicians already well-established there. Stephen too worked at the King's Theatre as music director for some operas, including his own La Cameriera Astuta, before moving in 1789 to the Theatre Royal, Drury Lane, which at this time was under the management of Richard Brinsley Sheridan. Sheridan's personal interest in the theatre had largely dried-up by this point in his career, and he was more interested in politics – his theatrical interests were primarily financial, and he had established a successful format of lavish musical spectaculars, more remarkable for their visual than musical content. To evade the royal monopoly on opera at the King's Theatre, Sheridan presented a mixture of Singspiel-type works specially written in English in the ballad-opera style, with "English'd" versions of popular operas playing in continental Europe in which he saw some commercial opportunity. Stephen Storace's first job at Drury Lane was to make an "English" version of Dittersdorf's German Singspiel Doktor und Apotheker, which appeared in English as Doctor & Apothecary in 1787 in Storace's version. The work of making "English" versions was not just a question of translation – all complicated musical numbers (especially trios, quartets etc.) had to be "cut" to make them performable by English casts who were primarily pantomime comedians without any great musical talent. This also meant transposition of some numbers, making a fresh English text, cutting whole numbers and replacing them with dialogue, and sometimes inserting new comic songs and "patter-songs" which the public greatly enjoyed.

Stephen quickly established his credentials with Sheridan as a young man who could quickly and competently produce good results. He also had an impresario's skill for judging what would make good box-office and bring in good receipts, and he took to adding famous numbers from the Vienna stage to "spice-up" works which needed it. Seeing that the repertoire of the King's Theatre was still largely made-up of opera seria works about ancient gods or monarchs of antiquity, Storace spotted a niche in the market for the new "romantic" style of ghost-stories, gothic horror, and romance, and his first purpose-written work for Drury Lane employed all these elements. The Haunted Tower (1789) was a box-office sensation, selling out for 50 nights in succession. No little part of the success was the performance of Michael Kelly in the male lead role. Up to this time, high notes in the male parts in the theatre had been crooned falsetto by performers who were more actors than singers. Kelly's aria to the ghost of the Haunted Tower – "Spirit of My Sainted Sire!" included a top B♭ which he took in full voice in the Italian style, and proved such a success that at most performances it was encored in full. This aria outlived the rest of Storace's output by decades, and was still being reprinted in parlour songbook anthologies for the amateur tenor a century later.

However, The Haunted Tower still included "borrowings" from other composers on whose reputations tickets might be sold, and Sheridan remained adamant – despite the success of the piece – that he did not want Storace composing fresh work as a regular occurrence. Storace was put to work producing an "English" version of André Grétry's Richard Cœur-de-Lion, with the unfortunate difficulty that John Bannister – the famous tragedian – was cast in the main role, and was tone-deaf. No amount of re-writing could get around the problem that Richard was supposed to sing his famous ballad so that Blondin would hear it outside the castle walls. As so often in Storace's life, he was saved by his friends. Michael Kelly was now established as the audience's favourite star after Bannister, and was given a Benefit Night in 1790 – by tradition, he could choose whatever piece he believed would bring in the best receipts at the box-office. At this period a "programme" at Drury Lane would always be a double-bill – a main work, and a one-act "afterpiece" which was usually a comedy. Kelly broke with tradition and risked his income by announcing – to Sheridan's disapproval – that instead of a popular favourite, he would premiere a new afterpiece by Storace, called No song, no supper. No Song outsold even The Haunted Tower, and proved the best-selling show at Drury Lane for the following decade. Nancy had appeared as a Guest Artist in The Haunted Tower – the success of No Song obliged Sheridan to take her "onto the books", and at last she secured a full-time engagement in Britain.

It seems likely that Storace had been working on an "English" version of Vicente Martín y Soler's (known as Martini) comedy Una cosa rara – an opera which had already been cited by Mozart in the final scene of Don Giovanni. However, presumably at around the date of the No Song triumph, Storace abruptly discarded all of Martini's music in Acts II and III, and had librettist James Cobb produce an entirely new libretto, creating another "romantic" hit situated in the midst of the Ottoman-Austrian war of a few years earlier, The Siege of Belgrade (1791). From this point on Storace abandoned the ballad-opera style completely, and wrote the entire piece in the Mozartian "Singspiel" style. The Siege is remarkable for the extended ensemble numbers such as the Act I Trio for the Seraskier, Lilla and Ghita, "Your passions thus deceiving" – divided into allegro-andante-allegro sections. Alive to what the public cheered most, Storace included a bravura coloratura aria for Mrs Crouch as the imprisoned Austrian hostage, Princess Catherine, "My plaint in no-one pity moves"; a warlike Act III aria for Kelly as the "noble Turk"; and an extraordinary "Queen of the Night"-style dramatic-coloratura Act III aria for Nancy, "Domestic Peace", with a string of double-octave fast upward scales to top c'' over French-horn fanfares that brought the house down. The printed vocal score not only includes one of the famous "scenery" engravings, but cast a glove down to the King's Theatre – avoiding all euphemism the work is clearly described as "an Opera, in three acts".

The year 1792 saw Storace produce the boldest of his operatic projects, Dido, Queen of Carthage, with a libretto by Prince Hoare after Metastasio's Didone abbandonata. This was the only all-sung opera Storace produced in English – all his other works had spoken dialogue between the musical numbers. His sister regarded it as Stephen's finest work. However, for whatever reason, the piece proved unpopular with the public, and was withdrawn after a short run. The music was not thought worth printing commercially, with the result that not a note of this opera now survives, nor were any solo numbers from it printed separately.

The Pirates, also produced in 1792, was partly adapted from Gli Equivoci, and is remarkable as affording one of the earliest instances of the introduction of a grand finale into an English opera. These works were followed by some less successful productions; but The Cherokee (1794) and The Three and the Deuce (1795) were very favourably received. The Cherokee did not, unlike The Siege of Belgrade, attempt to add any "exotic" music for the Cherokee – their "War March" is disappointingly four-square and tonal, but the "War Whoop" is an exciting number. The work also introduced the public to the boy-treble star, "Master Walsh", whose coloratura talents must have been remarkable as his numbers are no less complex than Crouch's or Nancy Storace's. He was to figure regularly in Storace's works thereafter.

Storace collaborated with Sheridan in bringing William Godwin's controversial novel Caleb Williams to the stage. In the light of the French Revolution, the work – about a faithful servant whose life is ruined by a vicious master – had gained considerable notoriety, and was produced under the title The Iron Chest, first performed on 12 March 1796.

Storace's final work was Mahmoud, Prince of Persia, but he never saw the premiere.

== Death ==
He caught cold at rehearsals for The Iron Chest, and died on 15 or 16 March 1796, aged 34. He is buried in Marylebone Parish Church with a monument by the celebrated sculptor Thomas Banks.

Nancy Storace organised to have the unfinished work completed. Kelly claims to have had a hand in doing so, but it is more likely that he paid other hands to do it, since he freely admitted he could not read the bass clef. The work was most likely finished and orchestrated by Orchestra Leader, John Shaw, who was Kelly's collaborator on all his later projects. The work was given as a Benefit Performance for Storace's widow. Mahmoud survives, but it is clear that the completed version was very makeshift.

Storace is also known to have been involved in preparing musical spectaculars for isolated events. It is intriguing to speculate what performances like The English Fleet in 1391 may have resembled, but no details survive. He also wrote pieces "to order" for favourite performers at the Drury Lane Theatre, such as the musical comedian Richard "Dicky" Suett, for whom he wrote the musical farce My Grandmother. Unfortunately we can only imagine the visual effect of numbers such as "Dicky's Walk", which must have accompanied some on-stage buffoonery of a greatly amusing nature.

== Legacy ==
Although Storace's English operas were popular in their time, their failure to endure in performance is in part due to the financial caution of his employer, Sheridan. A legendarily shrewd man with money, Sheridan refused to allow any copies of the Storace's works to be circulated, for fear of pirate versions being performed from which no royalties would be paid. In fact history shows that Sheridan's best attempts failed, and pirated versions of Storace's works were playing in New York by the end of the century. In 1800, the French composer Madame Ronssecy arranged and published variations on Storace's Lullaby (from his opera The Pirates) for harp.

It is assumed that Storace's carefully guarded opera scores and parts perished in the Drury Lane Theatre Fire. His two Viennese operas have been preserved, but only one of his English operas survives complete in score and parts – No Song, No Supper (published in Musica Britannica editions, edited by Roger Fiske). The other works survive only in piano and voice vocal scores issued by Storace's publishers, Longman & Broderip. (A number of these scores were reprinted by Kalmus Edition in the 1970s in the US, but all have been deleted and no details are available from Kalmus). The surviving vocal scores have clearly been prepared by an expert hand, and are extensively "cued" with the orchestral parts in smaller notes – it seems possible that Storace himself, or one of his closer assistants, must have prepared these vocal scores. There are, to date, no commercially available recordings of any of Storace's operas. In addition to the overtures for his operas, Storace wrote various instrumental works for chamber ensemble.

The character of Storace's music is preeminently English; but his early intercourse with Mozart gave him an immense advantage over his contemporaries in his management of the orchestra, while for the excellence of his writing for the voice he was no doubt indebted to the vocalisation of his sister Ann (Nancy) Storace.

== Musical compositions ==
=== Operas ===
- Gli sposi malcontenti (libretto by G. Brunati, opera buffa, 1785, Vienna)
- Gli equivoci (libretto by Lorenzo da Ponte based on Shakespeare's Comedy of Errors, opera buffa, 1786, Vienna)
- La cameriera astuta (Librettist unknown, comic opera, 1788, London)
- The Doctor and the Apothecary (libretto by James Cobb, afterpiece, 1788, London)
- The Haunted Tower (libretto by James Cobb, mainpiece, 1789, London)
- No song, no supper (libretto by Prince Hoare, afterpiece, 1790, London)
- The Siege of Belgrade (libretto by James Cobb, mainpiece, 1791, London)
- The Cave of Trophonius (libretto by Prince Hoare, afterpiece, 1791, London)
- Poor Old Drury (libretto by James Cobb, prelude, 1791, London)
- Dido, Queen of Carthage (libretto by Prince Hoare based on Metastasio, opera seria, 1792, London)
- The Pirates (libretto by James Cobb, mainpiece, 1792, London)
- The PricecThe Price (libretto by Prince Hoare, afterpiece, 1793, London)
- My Grandmother (libretto by Prince Hoare, afterpiece, 1794, London)
- Lodoiska (libretto by John Philip Kemble, afterpiece, 1794, London; an "English'd" version of the Cherubini opera, compiled by Storace, largely with Cherubini's music).
- The Glorious First of June (libretto by James Cobb and R. B. Sheridan, afterpiece, 1794)
- The Cherokee (libretto by James Cobb, afterpiece, 1794, London)
- The Three and the Deuce (libretto by Prince Hoare, afterpiece, 1795, London)
- The Iron Chest (libretto by George Colman II, mainpiece, 1796, London)
- Mahmoud (libretto by Prince Hoare, mainpiece, 1796, London)

=== Ballet ===
- Venus and Adonis (1793, London)
