= Vicente Martín y Soler =

Spanish composer (1754–1806)

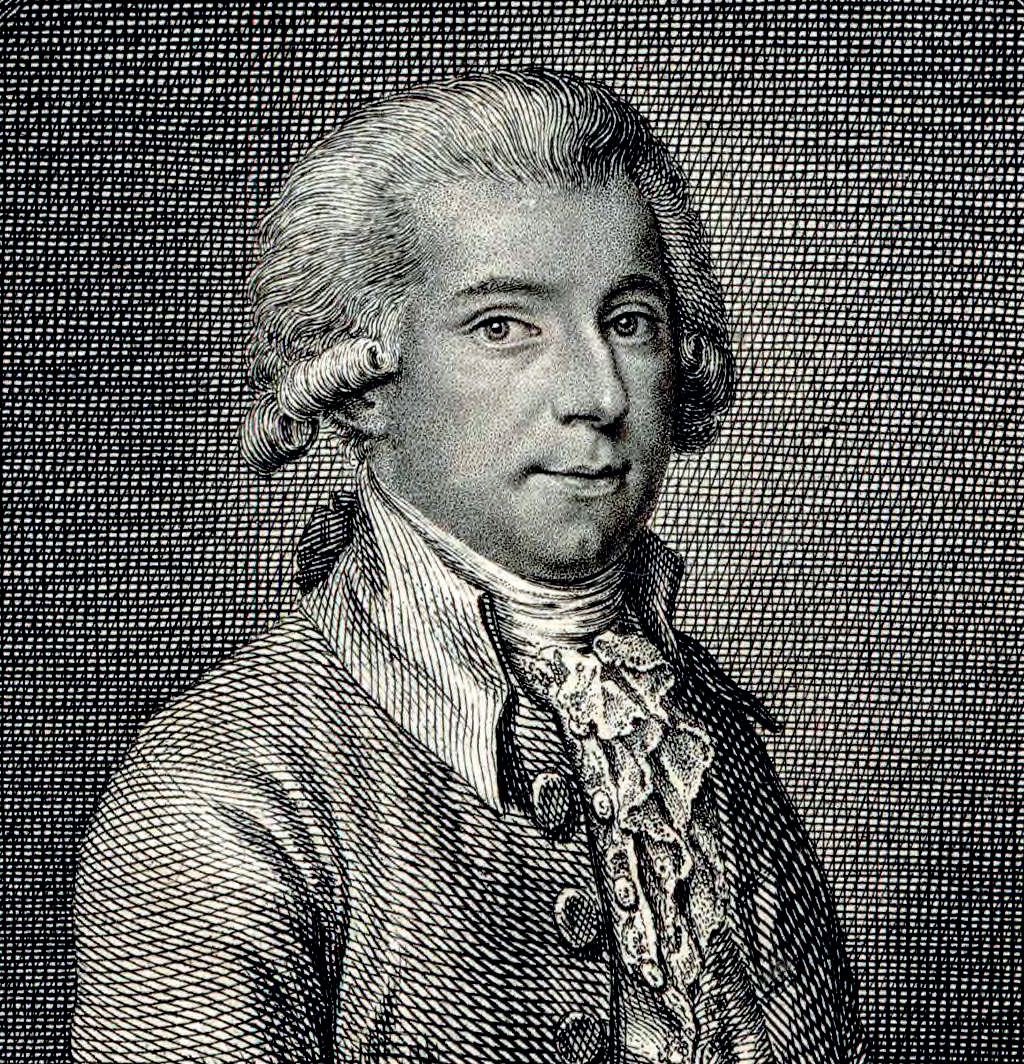
Vicente Martín y Soler

Anastasio Martín Ignacio Vicente Tadeo Francisco Pellegrin Martín y Soler (2 May 1754 – 30 January or 10 February 1806) was a Spanish composer of opera and ballet. Although relatively obscure now, in his own day he was compared favorably with his contemporary and admirer, Wolfgang Amadeus Mozart, as a composer of opera buffa. In his time he was called "Martini lo spagnuolo" ("Martini the Spaniard"); in modern times, he has been called "the Valencian Mozart". He was known primarily for his melodious Italian comic operas and his work with Lorenzo Da Ponte in the late 18th century, as well as the melody from Una cosa rara quoted in the dining scene of Mozart's Don Giovanni.

== Biography ==
Martín y Soler was born in Valencia. His father, Francisco Xavier Martín, was a tenor at the cathedral in town, where Vicente was a chorister in his youth. Vicente moved to Madrid probably around 1775, and studied music in Bologna under Giovanni Battista Martini. His first opera was Il tutore burlato (1775), to an Italian libretto adapted from Giovanni Paisiello's La frascatana, which in turn was based on a play of the same title by Filippo Livigni. This was premiered in 1775 at the Teatro Real Coliseo in San Lorenzo de El Escorial, north of Madrid. In 1776 or 1777 the composer had the libretto translated into Spanish and put it into zarzuela form, adding spoken dialogue, as La madrileña, o El tutor burlado. This was performed in Madrid during 1778, by which time Martín y Soler was back in Italy.

After 1776, he wrote Italian operas, both comic and serious, which were performed throughout Italy. In 1777, he travelled to Naples, where he composed for the Teatro di San Carlo. During this period, he worked with choreographer Charles le Picq to compose four ballets d’action: La Griselda (1779, derived from the libretto by Apostolo Zeno), Il ratto delle Sabine (1780), La bella Arsene (1781), and Tamas Kouli-Kan (1781, an interpretation of Vittorio Amedeo Cigna-Santi's libretto). He also worked with Zeno on an opera seria, Andromaca, in 1780. In addition, he composed two mezzocarattere ballets, La sposa persiana (1778) and Il barbiere di Siviglia (1781, based on the play by Pierre Beaumarchais). In Naples, he also worked with court librettist Luigi Serio on the composition of opere serie, producing Ifigenia (1779) and Ipermestra (1780). Around 1780, he was also appointed court composer for Charles IV of Spain.

In 1785 he moved to Vienna, where he enjoyed great success with three operas composed to texts by Lorenzo Da Ponte, who was simultaneously collaborating with Mozart and Antonio Salieri, the rival of the former. These three comedies were Una cosa rara (1786, based on the play La luna de la sierra by Luis Vélez de Guevara); Il burbero di buon cuore (1786, based on Carlo Goldoni's French-language play Le bourru bienfaisant); and L'arbore di Diana (1787). He is credited with introducing, in Una cosa rara, the waltz to Vienna; and a melody from the same work is quoted by Mozart in the banquet scene in Act 2 of Don Giovanni (1787). Soon, Martín y Soler was also composing highly successful operas for Joseph II's imperial theater.

In 1788, Martín y Soler was invited to serve as composer and singing instructor at Catherine's Russian court at St. Petersburg, where he wrote three Russian-language operas, The Unfortunate Hero Kosmetovich (1789, libretto written in part by Catherine the Great), Melomania (1790), and Fedul and his Children (1791, with Vasili Pashkevich). Moving to London for the 1795 season, he provided three more Italian language operas: La capricciosa corretta (libretto again by Lorenzo Da Ponte, partly adapted from Shakespeare's The Taming of the Shrew); L'isola del piacere and Le nozze de' contadini spagnuoli. He returned to St. Petersburg and was appointed maestro di capella at the Smolny Institute (then called the Educational Society of Noble Maidens) in 1796. After returning to St Petersburg, he wrote his last opera, La festa del villaggio (1798).

He also wrote a number of tragic ballets during his residence as Court Composer there, including Didon abandonée (1792), Amour et Psyché (1793, based on Psyché by Molière, Corneille and Philippe Quinault), Tancrède (1799) and Le retour de Poliorcète (1799). Shortly before his 1806 death in Saint Petersburg, he served as inspector for the Italian opera there. He was still in his post when he died. His grave is located next to the St. Alexander Nevsky Monastery, alongside those of composers such as Tchaikovsky and Glinka.
