= Giovanni Battista Lorenzi =

Giovanni Battista Lorenzi (or Giambattista; 1721–1807) was an Italian librettist. He was born in Puglia and died in Naples and was a friend of Giovanni Paisiello, with whom he collaborated on numerous operas.

== Libretti ==
- Fra i due litiganti il terzo gode (set by Giovanni Battista Pescetti, 1749)
- Le gelosie (set by Niccolò Piccinni, 1755)
- L'idolo cinese (set by Giovanni Paisiello, 1767; set by Giacomo Rust, 1773; set by Joseph Schuster, 1776)
- Il furbo malaccorto (set by Giovanni Paisiello, 1767)
- La luna abitata (set by Giovanni Paisiello, 1768)
- La finta maga per vendetta (set by Giovanni Paisiello, 1768)
- Don Chisciotte della Mancia (set by Giovanni Paisiello; set by Marcello Bernardini, 1769; set by Niccolò Piccinni, 1770; set by Giovanni Paisiello e Florian Leopold Gassmann, 1771, as Don Quischott von Mancia)
- Gelosia per gelosia (set by Niccolò Piccinni, 1770)
- La corsara (set by Niccolò Piccinni, 1771)
- Gli amanti comici (set by Giovanni Paisiello, 1772)
- Le trame zingaresche (set by Niccolò Piccinni, 1772)
- Il tamburo (set by Giovanni Paisiello, 1773)
- Il duello (set by Giovanni Paisiello, 1774)
- Le finte zingarelle (set by Agostino Accorimboni, 1774)
- Il divertimento de' numi (scherzo rappresentativo per musica; set by Giovanni Paisiello, 1774)

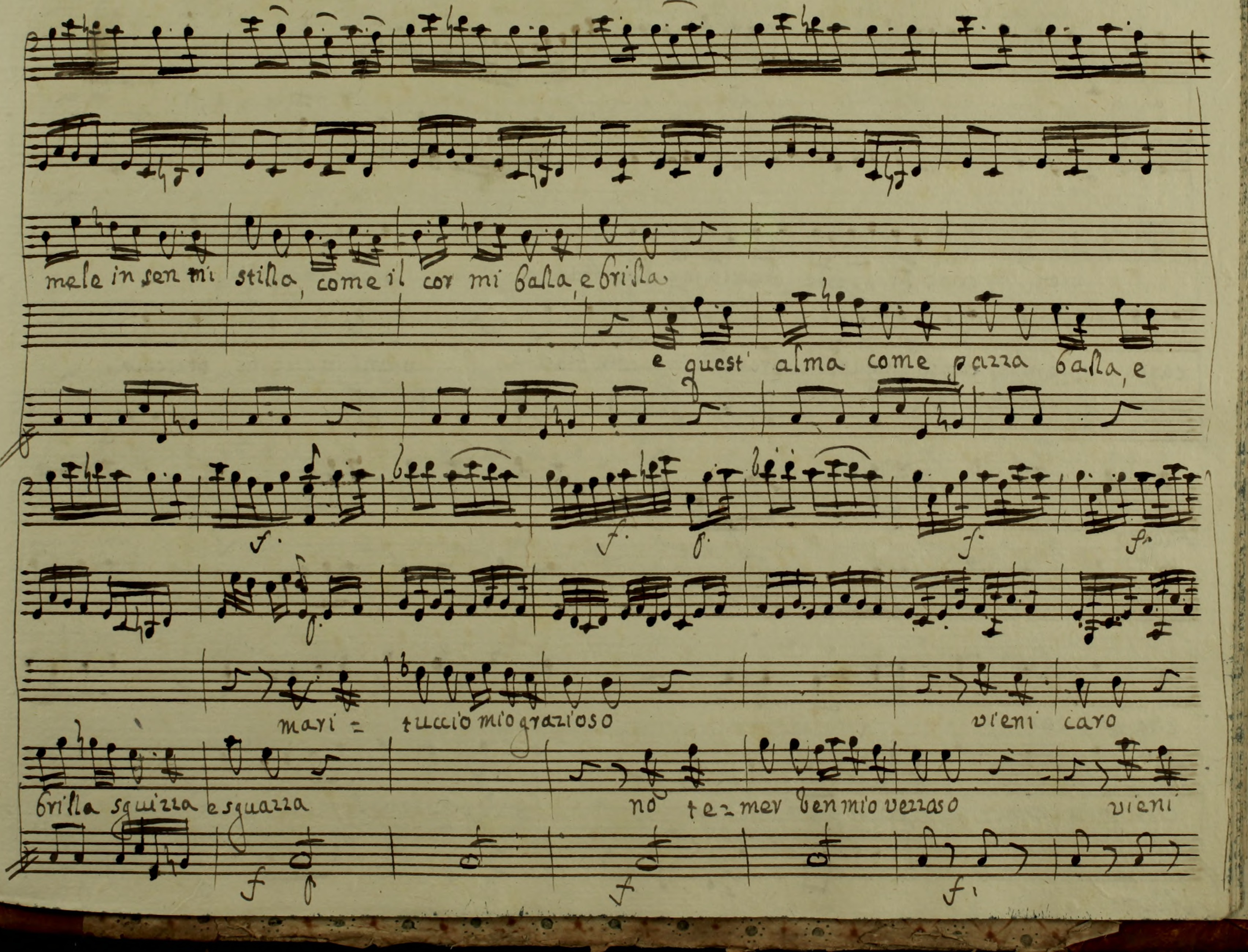
Part of the score for Il Socrate immaginario

- Il Socrate immaginario (set by Giovanni Paisiello, 1775; set by Giacomo Rust, 1776)
- La fuga (set by Gaetano Monti, 1777)
- Il geloso sincerato (set by Gaetano Monti, 1779; set by Giuseppe Nicolini, 1804)
- L'infedeltà fedele (set by Domenico Cimarosa, 1779; set by Joseph Haydn, 1780, as L'infedeltà premiata)
- I due gemelli (set by Giacomo Tritto, 1783; set by Salvatore Agnelli, 1839)
- Il convitato di pietra (set by Giacomo Tritto, 1783; set by Vincenzo Fabrizi, 1787)
- La scuffiara (set by Giacomo Tritto, 1784)
- L'apparenza inganna ossia La villeggiatura (set by Domenico Cimarosa, 1784)
- Il marito disperato (set by Domenico Cimarosa, 1785)
- La finta zingara (set by Pietro Alessandro Guglielmi, 1785)
- Le sventure fortunate (set by Pietro Alessandro Guglielmi, 1785)
- La modista raggiratrice (basato su Il Filippo di Gennaro Antonio Federico; set by Giovanni Paisiello, 1787)
- Le vane gelosie (set by Giovanni Paisiello, 1790)
- Il dottorato di Pulcinella (set by Giuseppe Farinelli, 1792)
- La serva onorata (basato su Le nozze di Figaro di Lorenzo Da Ponte; set by Niccolò Piccinni, 1792)
- Le fallaci apparenze (set by Gennaro Astarita, 1793)
- La pietra simpatica (set by Silvestro Palma, 1795)
- Gli amanti ridicoli (set by Silvestro Palma, 1797)
- Don Anchise campione (set by Johann Nepomuk Hummel, 1800)
- L'equivoco (set by Pietro Casella, 1804)
- Le seguaci di Diana (set by Silvestro Palma, 1805)
