= List of operas by Antonio Salieri =

This is a list of the operas by Antonio Salieri (1750–1825).

== List ==
Operas by Antonio Salieri
Title	Genre	Acts	Libretto	Premiere	
Title	Genre	Acts	Libretto	Date	Venue
La Vestale	dramma per musica	3 acts	Unknown	Unperformed, a culminating study for his teacher Gassmann	Vienna
Le donne letterate	commedia per musica	3 acts	Giovanni Gastone Boccherini, after Molière's Les femmes savantes	Carnival 1770	Vienna, Burgtheater (or Kärtnertortheater)
L'amore innocente	pastorale	2 acts	Giovanni Gastone Boccherini	1770	Vienna, Burgtheater (or Kärtnertortheater)
Don Chisciotte alle nozze di Gamace	divertimento teatrale	2 acts	Giovanni Gastone Boccherini, after Miguel de Cervantes' Don Quixote	Carnival 1771	Vienna, Burgtheater (or Kärtnertortheater)
La moda, ossia scompigli domestici	pasticcio	2 acts	Pietro Cipretti	1771	Vienna
Armida	dramma per musica	3 acts	Marco Coltellini, after Torquato Tasso's Gerusalemme liberata	2 June 1771	Vienna, Burgtheater (or Kärtnertortheater)
La fiera di Venezia	commedia per musica	3 acts	Giovanni Gastone Boccherini	29 January 1772	Vienna, Burgtheater (or Kärtnertortheater)
Il barone di Rocca antica	dramma giocoso	2 acts	Giuseppe Petrosellini	12 May 1772	Vienna, Burgtheater (or Kärtnertortheater)
La secchia rapita	dramma eroicomico	3 acts	Giovanni Gastone Boccherini, after Alessandro Tassoni's play of the same name	21 October 1772	Vienna, Kärtnertortheater
La locandiera	dramma giocoso	3 acts	Domenico Poggi, after Carlo Goldoni's play of the same name	8 June 1773	Vienna, Burgtheater
La calamita de' cuori	dramma giocoso	3 acts	Giovanni de Gamerra, after Carlo Goldoni	11 October 1774	Vienna, Kärtnertortheater
La finta scema	commedia per musica	2 acts	Giovanni de Gamerra	9 September 1775	Vienna, Burgtheater
Daliso e Delmita	azione pastorale	3 acts	Giovanni de Gamerra	29 July 1776	Vienna, Burgtheater
Europa riconosciuta	dramma per musica	2 acts	Mattia Verazi	3 August 1778	Milan, Teatro alla Scala (inauguration)
La scuola de' gelosi	dramma giocoso	2 acts	Caterino Mazzolà	Carnival 1779	Venice, San Moisè
La partenza inaspettata	intermezzo	2 parts	Giuseppe Petrosellini	Carnival 1779	Rome, Teatro Valle
Il talismano (Acts 2 and 3 by Giacomo Rust)	dramma giocoso	3 acts	Carlo Goldoni; revised by Lorenzo Da Ponte	21 August 1779; Revised: 10 September 1788	Milan, Teatro Cannobiana; revised: Vienna, Burgtheater
La dama pastorella	intermezzo	2 parts	Giuseppe Petrosellini	1780	Rome, Teatro Valle
Der Rauchfangkehrer, oder Die unentbehrlichen Verräther ihrer Herrschaften aus Eigennutz	musikalisches Lustspiel	3 acts	Leopold von Auenbrugger	30 April 1781	Vienna, Burgtheater
Semiramide	dramma per musica	3 acts	Metastasio	14 January 1782	Munich, Residenz Theatre
Les Danaïdes	tragédie lyrique	5 acts	Marius François Louis Gaud Du Roullet and Louis Théodore Baron de Tschudi, after Raniero de Calzabigi	26 April 1784	Paris, Opéra
Il ricco d'un giorno	dramma giocoso	3 acts	Lorenzo Da Ponte after Giovanni Bertati	6 December 1784	Vienna, Burgtheater
La grotta di Trofonio	opera comica	2 acts	Giovanni Battista Casti	12 October 1785	Vienna, Burgtheater
Prima la musica e poi le parole	divertimento teatrale	1 act	Giovanni Battista Casti	7 February 1786	Vienna, Schloss Schönbrunn Orangerie
Les Horaces	tragédie lyrique	3 acts	Nicholas-François Guillard, after Pierre Corneille	2 December 1786	Versailles
Tarare	opéra	prologue and 5 acts	Pierre Beaumarchais	8 June 1787	Paris, Opéra
Axur, re d'Ormus	dramma tragicomico	5 acts	Lorenzo Da Ponte, after Pierre Beaumarchais' Tarare	8 January 1788	Vienna, Burgtheater
Cublai, gran kan de' Tartari	dramma eroicomico	2 acts	Giovanni Battista Casti	composed 1788; first performed 1998	Würzburg, Mainfrankentheater
Il pastor fido	dramma tragicomico	4 acts	Lorenzo Da Ponte, after Battista Guarini's play of the same name	11 February 1789	Vienna, Burgtheater
La cifra	dramma giocoso	2 acts	Lorenzo Da Ponte, after Giuseppe Petrosellini's La dama pastorella	11 December 1789	Vienna, Burgtheater
Catilina	dramma eroicomico	2 acts	Giovanni Battista Casti	composed 1792; first performed 1994	Staatstheater Darmstadt
Il mondo alla rovescia	dramma giocoso	2 acts	Caterino Mazzolà, after his libretto L'isola capricciosa	13 January 1795	Vienna, Burgtheater
Eraclito e Democrito	commedia per musica	2 acts	Giovanni de Gamerra	13 August 1795	Vienna, Burgtheater
Palmira, regina di Persia	dramma eroicomico	2 acts	Giovanni de Gamerra, after Voltaire's La princesse de Babylone	14 October 1795	Vienna, Kärtnertortheater
Il moro	commedia per musica	2 acts	Giovanni de Gamerra	7 August 1796	Vienna, Burgtheater
I tre filosofi		2 acts	Giovanni de Gamerra	composed 1797, but unperformed	
Falstaff, ossia Le tre burle	dramma giocoso	2 acts	Carlo Prospero Defranceschi, after William Shakespeare's The Merry Wives of Windsor	3 January 1799	Vienna, Kärtnertortheater
Cesare in Farmacusa	dramma eroicomico	2 acts	Carlo Prospero Defranceschi	2 June 1800	Vienna, Kärtnertortheater
L'Angiolina ossia Il matrimonio per Susurro	opera buffa	2 acts	Carlo Prospero Defranceschi, after Ben Jonson's Epicœne	22 October 1800	Vienna, Kärtnertortheater
Annibale in Capua	dramma per musica	3 acts	Antonio Simone Sografi	19 May 1801	Trieste, Teatro Nuovo
La bella selvaggia	opera buffa	2 acts	Giovanni Bertati	composed 1802, but unperformed	
Die Neger	Singspiel	2 acts	Georg Friedrich Treitschke	10 November 1804	Vienna, Theater an der Wien
