= Teresa Saporiti =

Italian operatic soprano and composer (1763–1869)

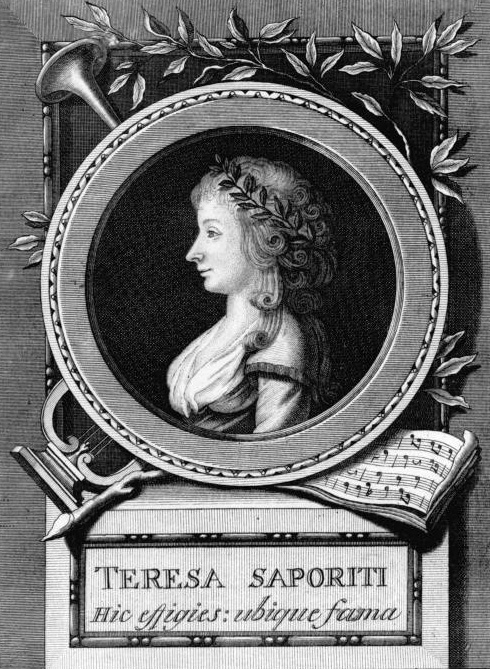
1791 portrait of Teresa Saporiti. The Latin inscription reads: "Her image here, her fame everywhere"

Teresa Saporiti (1763 – 17 March 1869) was an Italian operatic soprano and composer most remembered today for creating the role of Donna Anna in Mozart's opera Don Giovanni. She was born in Milan and died there at the age of 106. In her later years, she was often referred to by her married name, Teresa Saporiti-Codecasa.

== Life and career ==
Saporiti was born in Milan. Little is known about her early life, but in 1782 she and her elder sister Antonia were engaged by the impresario, Pasquale Bondini, to sing with his Italian opera company in Leipzig. According to The Cambridge Mozart Encyclopedia (and several other sources), Theresa and Antonia may have been the sisters of opera singer Caterina Bondini (born as Caterina Saporiti), who was the first Zerlina in Don Giovanni and Pasquale Bondini's wife. Antonia abandoned her career early on and died in Milan in 1787. Teresa, however, stayed with the company until 1788 and performed with them in Leipzig, Dresden and Prague, most famously as Donna Anna in the 1787 world premiere of Don Giovanni. She was an attractive woman, and several authors have speculated that Don Giovanni's emphatic line in the act 2 dinner scene, "Ah che piatto saporito!" (Ah, what a tasty dish!) is a punning reference to Saporiti.

Between 1788 and 1789, she sang in Venice at the Teatro Venier as Mandane in Ferdinando Bertoni's Artaserse (November 1788); as Selene in the world premiere of Pietro Alessandro Guglielmi's Arsace (26 December 1788); and as Armida in the world premiere of Guglielmi's Rinaldo (28 January 1789). She then appeared at La Scala where on 20 April 1789 she sang the title role in the world premiere of Francesco Bianchi's Nitteti. She went on to perform in Parma, Modena, Bologna, Vienna, Moscow, and Saint Petersburg. In Saint Petersburg she was the prima buffa assoluta in Gennaro Astarita's opera company and sang in operas by Astarita, Giovanni Paisiello, and Domenico Cimarosa. Saporiti also composed two arias, "Dormivo in mezzo al prato" and "Caro mio ben, deh senti", which were published in 1796.

In her later years, she was often referred to by her married name, Teresa Saporiti-Codecasa, and lived in Milan where she held salon concerts in her house. At one of these concerts in 1841, Verdi presented the music for his opera Nabucco which was to premiere the following year at La Scala. Teresa Saporiti died in Milan on 17 March 1869 at the age of 106. Her daughter, Fulvia, continued corresponding with Verdi for several years afterwards.

== Sources ==
- Cairns, David, Mozart and His Operas, University of California Press, 2006. ISBN 0-520-22898-7
- Campana, Alessandra, "The performance of opera buffa" in Stefano La Via and Roger Parker (eds.), Pensieri per un maestro: studi in onore di Pierluigi Petrobelli, EDT srl, 2002, pp. 125–134. ISBN 88-7063-645-3
- Casaglia, Gherardo (2005)."Saporiti". L'Almanacco di Gherardo Casaglia (in Italian).
- Deutsch, Otto Erich, Mozart, A Documentary Biography (English translation by Eric Blom), Stanford University Press, 1965, p. 102. ISBN 0-8047-0233-0
- Keefe, Simon, "Saporiti, Teresa" in Cliff Eisen and Simon P. Keefe (eds.), The Cambridge Mozart Encyclopedia, Cambridge University Press, 2006, pp. 444–445. ISBN 0-521-85659-0
- Kelly, Thomas Forrest, First Nights at the Opera, Yale University Press, 2006, pp. 95–96. ISBN 0-300-11526-1
- Phillips-Matz, Mary Jane, Verdi: A Biography, Oxford University Press, 1933, p. 110 and note 35, p. 794. ISBN 0-19-313204-4
- Randel, Don Michael (ed.), The Harvard Biographical Dictionary of Music, Harvard University Press, 1996 p. 785. ISBN 0-674-37299-9
- Sadie, Stanley (ed.) The New Grove Dictionary of Music and Musicians, Macmillan, 1980, Vol. 1, pp. 488–489. ISBN 0-333-23111-2
