= David Wyn Jones =

British musicologist (born 1950)

David Wyn Jones FLSW
- Born: 1950 (age 75–76)
- Education: University of Wales (Ph.D.)
- Occupation: musicologist
- Known for: expert on music of the Classical period
- Notable work: Oxford Composer Companions: Haydn

David Wyn Jones FLSW (born 1950) is a British musicologist. He is an expert on music of the Classical period, including that of Haydn and Beethoven.

== Professional life ==
Wyn Jones received his Ph.D. from the University of Wales in 1978, on the basis of a doctoral dissertation in three volumes entitled The String Quartets of Vanhal. Earlier (1974) he had been appointed as a Lecturer at Cardiff University, and was subsequently promoted there several times: Senior Lecturer (1998), Reader (2002), Professorial Chair (2007). He served as Head of School from March 2008 to July 2013. He serves on the editorial board of the journal Eighteenth-Century Music and the e-journal Haydn. He has given lectures and talks at the BBC Proms, the Edinburgh Festival, and at the Royal Festival Hall and other major venues.

== Honors ==
His book Oxford Composer Companions: Haydn was awarded a prize by the International Association of Music Librarians (UK and Ireland) in 2002. He has served as chairman of the Music Libraries Trust since 2005 and was elected a Vice President of the Royal Musical Association in 2009. In 2019, he was elected as a Fellow of the Learned Society of Wales.

== Books ==
Wyn Jones's books incorporate a large amount of factual information, much of it from recent scholarly research. He tends to favor trustworthy over vivid sources (e.g. for Haydn, the sober Griesinger, in preference to the tale-spinning Dies and Carpani).

List of books:

- (1988, with H. C. Robbins Landon) Haydn. His Life and Music. London: Thames and Hudson.
- (1995) Beethoven. Pastoral Symphony. Cambridge: Cambridge University Press.
- (1996, ed. with Otto Biba) Studies in Music History presented to H. C. Robbins Landon on his Seventieth Birthday. London: Thames and Hudson.
- (1996, ed.) Music in Eighteenth-Century Austria. Cambridge: Cambridge University Press.
- (1998) The Life of Beethoven. Cambridge: Cambridge University Press.
- (2000, ed.) Music in Eighteenth-Century Britain. Aldershot: Ashgate.
- (2002/rev. 2009, ed.) Oxford Composer Companions: Haydn. Oxford: Oxford University Press.
- (2006) The Symphony in Beethoven’s Vienna. Cambridge: Cambridge University Press.
- (2009) The Life of Haydn. Cambridge: Cambridge University Press.

Editions of music:

- (1980) Vanhal, Johann Baptist, Six quartets : an edition and commentary. Cardiff: University College Cardiff Press.
- (ca. 1982) Vanhal, Johann Baptist, Divertimento in G for violin, viola and violone (double bass). London: Yorke Edition.
- (1984) Joseph Haydn, Fifteen Scottish, Welsh, and Irish folksongs. University College Cardiff Press.
- (1989) J. C. Bach. Symphonies III. Seven Symphonic Works from Eighteenth-Century Printed Sources. The Collected Works of Johann Christian Bach 1735-1782, Volume 28. New York: Garland Press.
- (ca. 1992) Joseph Haydn, Missa "Sunt bona mixta malis" : Hob. XXII:2 (with H.C. Robbins Landon) Paris: M. Bois.
