= Giovanni Bertati =

Italian librettist

Giovanni Bertati (10 July 1735 – 1 March 1815) was an Italian librettist.

Bertati was born in Martellago, Republic of Venice. In 1763, he wrote his first libretto, La morte di Dimone ("The Death of Dimone"), set to music by Antonio Tozzi. Two years later, L'isola della fortuna ("The Island of Fortune"), based on Bertati's libretto and Andrea Luchesi's music, was performed in Vienna. During 1770, Bertati visited Vienna several times, where he collaborated with Baldassare Galuppi. Emperor Leopold II gave Bertati the title of Poeta Cesareo ("Imperial Poet") of the Italian Opera in Vienna, previously held by Lorenzo Da Ponte, who, a year earlier, fell in disgrace with the emperor. He died in Venice, Italy.

During his career as a librettist, Bertati was almost exclusively devoted to writing drammi giocosi. His most celebrated libretto is Il matrimonio segreto ("The Secret Marriage"), set to the music of Domenico Cimarosa, and premiered on 7 February 1792, in Vienna.

== Libretti ==
The following is the list of 70 libretti by Bertati; the years refer to first performances.

- La morte di Dimone ossia L'innocenza vendicata (music by Antonio Tozzi, 1763)
- Serenata per musica (music by Andrea Luchesi, 1764)
- L'isola della fortuna (music by Andrea Luchesi, 1765)
- Il villano geloso (music by Baldassare Galuppi, 1769; music by Johann Gottlieb Naumann, 1770; music by Giuseppe Sarti under the title I finti eredi, 1785)
- L'anello in cantanto (music by Ferdinando Bertoni, 1771)
- Calandrino (music by Giuseppe Gazzaniga, 1771; music by Giuseppe Gazzaniga and Giacomo Rust under the title L'avaro deluso, 1773; music by Antonio Sacchini, 1778)
- L'inimico delle donne (music by Baldassare Galuppi, 1771; music by Giuseppe Gazzaniga under the title Zon-Zon principe di Kibin-Kinka, 1773)
- La locanda (music by Giuseppe Gazzaniga, 1771; music by Giovanni Paisiello under the title Il fanatico in berlina, 1791)
- L'isola di Alcina (music by Giuseppe Gazzaniga, 1771–72; music by Giacomo Rust, 1772; music by Alessandro Bianchi, 1794)
- I visionari (music by Gennaro Astarita, 1772; music by Giovanni Paisiello under the title Gli astrologi immaginari, 1779)
- La contessa di Bimbimpoli (music by Gennaro Astarita, 1772)
- La tomba di Merlino (music by Giuseppe Gazzaniga, 1772)
- Armida (music by Johann Gottlieb Naumann, 1773; music by Johann Rudolf Zumsteeg, 1786)
- Mirandolina (music by Pietro Alessandro Guglielmi, 1773; music by Luigi Caruso under the title La virtuosa alla moda, 1776; music by Vincenzo Fabrizi under the title L'amore per interesse, 1787)
- Il tamburo notturno (music by Giovanni Paisiello, 1773; music by Giovanni Battista Lorenzi under the title Il tamburo)
- La villanella incostante (music by Johann Gottlieb Naumann, 1773)
- Il marito che non ha mogli (music by Gennaro Astarita, 1774)
- Il geloso in cimento (music by Pasquale Anfossi, 1774)
- Il principe ipocondriaco (music by Gennaro Astarita, 1774; music by Johann Gottlieb Naumann, 1776)
- L'avaro (music by Pasquale Anfossi, 1775; also set by Gennaro Astarita, 1776 and Ferdinando Orlandi, 1801)
- L'amor bizzarro ossia La gelosa di sé stesso (music by Giacomo Rust, 1775)
- La novità (music by Felice Alessandri, 1775; music by Giovanni Valentini under the title Il capriccio drammatico, 1787)
- La donna instabile (music by Giovanni Battista Borghi, 1776; music by Antonio Boroni, 1776; music by Giovanni Battista Borghi under the title Gli tre pretendenti, 1777)
- Isabella e Rodrigo ossia La costanza in amore (music by Pasquale Anfossi, 1776)
- Lo sposo disperato (music by Pasquale Anfossi, also under the title Il zotico incivilito, 1777; music by Vicenzo Nusco, 1808)
- Il curioso indiscreto (music by Pasquale Anfossi, 1777) – disputed attribution
- La forza delle donne (music by Pasquale Anfossi, also under the title Il trionfo delle donne, 1778; music by Bernardo Ottani under the title Le amazzoni, 1784; music by Peter von Winter under the title Ogus ossia Il trionfo del bel sesso; music by Giuseppe Nicolini under the title Ogus ossia Il trionfo del bel sesso, 1799)
- Il cavalier errante (music by Tommaso Traetta, 1778)
- Le industrie amorose (music by Bernardo Ottani, 1778; music by Pasquale Anfossi under the title Il matrimonio per inganno, 1779)
- La vendemmia (music by Giuseppe Gazzaniga, also under the title Le vendemmie, 1778)
- Azorre di Kibinga (music by Pasquale Anfossi, 1779)
- Le nozze in contrasto (music by Giovanni Valentini, 1779)
- Il più bel dono inutile (music by Antonio Rosetti, 1779)
- I quaqueri (music by Antonio Rosetti, 1779)
- Li rivali ridicoli (music by Michele Mortellari, 1780)
- La statua matematica (music by Giovanni Valentini, 1780; music by Luigi Caruso under the title L'antiquario burlato ossia La statua matematica, 1786)
- Le teste deboli (music by Francesco Salari, 1780)
- L'imbroglio delle tre spose (music by Pasquale Anfossi, 1781)
- Il marito geloso (music by Luigi Caruso, 1781)
- L'opera nuova (music by Matteo Rauzzini, 1781)
- Lo sposalizio per dispetto (music by Gaetano Monti, 1781)
- Gli amanti alla prova (music by Luigi Caruso, 1783; music by Francesco Piticchio, also under the title Gli amanti dispettosi, 1784)
- Le due sorelle incognite (music by Antonio Calegari, 1783)
- La villanella rapita (music by Francesco Bianchi, 1783)
- Il serraglio di Osmano (music by Giuseppe Gazzaniga, 1784)
- Le spose ricuperate (music by Luigi Caruso, also under the title I campi elisi ossia Le spose ricuperate, 1785)
- L'amore costante (music by Giuseppe Gazzaniga, 1786; music by Pierre Dutillieu under the title Nannerina e Pandolfino ossia Gli sposi in cimento, 1792)
- La contessa di Novaluna (music by Vincenzo Fabrizi, 1786)
- Le donne fanatiche (music by Giuseppe Gazzaniga, 1786)
- Chi sta bene non si muova (music by Ferdinando Robuschi, 1787)
- Don Giovanni Tenorio (music by Giuseppe Gazzaniga, 1787)
- L'orfanella americana (music by Pasquale Anfossi, 1787; music by Friedrich Christoph Gestewitz, 1791)
- Il curioso accidente (music by Gennaro Astarita, 1789)
- La fata capricciosa (music by Francesco Gardi, 1789)
- Il pazzo glorioso (music by Marcello Bernardini, 1790)
- Il fanatico in berlina (music by Giovanni Paisiello, 1791)
- L'impresario in scompiglio (music by Gennaro Astarita, 1791)
- Il matrimonio segreto (music by Domenico Cimarosa, 1792; music by Anchille Graffigna, 1883)
- Amor rende segace (music by Domenico Cimarosa, 1793)
- La principessa di Amalfi (music by Joseph Weigl, also under the title La contessa di Amalfi, 1794)
- La bella Lauretta (music by Francesco Gardi, 1795)
- L'intrigo amoroso (music by Ferdinando Paer, also under the titles Il male vien dal buco, Saed ossia Il serraglio and Gli intrighi del serraglio, 1795)
- Andromeda (music by Niccolò Antonio Zingarelli, 1796)
- La donna innamorata (music by Giuseppe Nicolini, 1796)
- La donna di genio volubile (music by Marcos António Portugal, 1796)
- L'amor l'astuzia insegna (music by Francesco Gardi, 1797; music by Francesco Gardi, 1801)
- Il medico di Lucca (music by Sebastiano Nasolini, also under the title Il medico dei bagni, 1797)
- La pace (music by Vincenzo Panza; music by Simon Mayr and Gaetano Marinelli, 1798)
- Le tre orfanelle ossia la Scola di musica (music by Marcello Bernardini, 1798)
- Gli umori contrari (music by Sebastiano Nasolini, 1798)

"Melinda" (1798)

- La bella selvaggia (music by Antonio Salieri, 1802)

== Sources ==
- Warrack, John and West, Ewan (1992), The Oxford Dictionary of Opera, 782 pages, ISBN 0-19-869164-5
