= Ferdinando Orlandi =

Italian composer

Ferdinando Orlandi (7 October 1774 – 5 January 1848), also referred to as Orland and Orlando. Little is known of his early life and his year of birth is also cited as 1777. He was an Italian musician and teacher of singing who composed cantatas and sacred music (including four masses), but was particularly known for his operas, not all of which have survived. He was born and died in Parma.

== Life ==
Orlandi studied music with Gaspare Rugarli, organist at the ducal chapel of Colorno, then in Parma with Gaspare Ghiretti and probably with Ferdinando Paer. In 1793 he entered the Conservatorio della Pietà della Turchini in Naples, where he studied counterpoint with Nichola Sala and Giacomo Tritto. In 1799 he returned to Parma, where he was appointed choirmaster. In 1801, his theatrical career began with the comic opera The Scottish Pupil (La pupilla scozzese) based on a libretto by Lorenzo Da Ponte that had earlier been set by Antonio Salieri in Vienna in 1789.

When the Duchy of Parma and Piacenza was annexed to the French Republic in 1801, Orlandi moved to Milan, where his very successful comic opera The Mayor of Chioggia (Il podestà di Chioggia) was performed. Contemporary publicity noted that it was a satire on a Venetian magistrate during the turmoil of the Cisalpine Republic. Thereafter Orlandi pursued his career in Milan, where he had become professor at the Conservatory of Music, even after the duchy was restored to Austrian control in 1814. In 1822 he moved to Munich, the Bavarian capital, and the following year to the court of Württemberg in Stuttgart, where he remained as Kapellmeister until 1828. At that period a cantata dedicated to Queen Pauline Therese of Württemberg was published. On his return to Parma, Orlandi applied unsuccessfully for the post of professor of singing at the Ospizio delle Arti. In November 1835 he was given the honorary appointment of choirmaster by the Duchess Maria Luigia and later teacher of choral music. In 1837 he was appointed to the Order of the Golden Spur by Pope Gregory XVI.

== Work ==
Orlandi came to prominence in the first decade of the 19th century, between the death of Domenico Cimarosa and the advent of Gioachino Rossini. By 1813 his operatic career had all but come to an end but saw a last flowering in 1820. Both the texts he set then were based on foreign themes. The libretto of Rodrigo di Valenza by Felice Romani had already been set by Pietro Generali in 1817 and performed in Milan. Loosely based on William Shakespeare’s King Lear, the scene was transposed to Spain. Fedra, Orlandi’s final opera, was based on the Classical story of Phaedra but completely failed. Giovanni Bertati's libretto for L'Avaro was based on Molière's L'Avare. It had already been set by Pasquale Anfossi in 1775 and in 1776 by Gennaro Astarita.

The following are the operas whose titles are recorded:

- La pupilla scozzese (libretto by Lorenzo Da Ponte, Parma, Teatro Ducale, 1801)
- Il podestà di Chioggia (comic opera, libretto by Angelo Anelli, Milan, Teatro alla Scala, 1801)
- Azemira e Cimene (libretto by Gaetano Rossi, Florence, Teatro alla Pergola, 1801)
- Il deputato di Rocca (Teatro San Luca, Venice, 1801)
- L'amore deluso (Florence, Teatro alla Pergola, 1802)
- L'amor stravagante (libretto by Florimondo Ermioneo, Milan, Teatro alla Scala, 1802)
- I furbi alle nozze (comic opera, Florence, Teatro del Cocomero, 1803)
- L'avaro (comic opera, libretto di Giovanni Bertati, Florence Teatro del Cocomero, 1803)
- Il fiore or Il matrimonio per svenimento (opera buffa, libretto by Giuseppe Maria Foppa, Venice, Teatro San Benedetto, 1803)
- I furbi alle nozze (Florence, Teatro del Cocomero, 1803)
- Le nozze chimeriche (libretto by Adrante Locrense, Milan, Teatro Carcano, 1804)
- Nino (libretto by Ippolito Zanelli, Brescia, Teatro Grande, 1804)
- Le lettere or Il sarto declamatore (libretto by Angelo Anelli, Milan, Teatro Carcano, 1804)
- La sposa contrastata (libretto by Francesco Saverio Zini, Rome, Teatro Valle, 1804)
- La villanella fortunata) libretto by Giovanni Bertati, Turin, 1805)
- I raggiri amorosi (Milan, Teatro alla Scala, 30 maggio 1806)
- Corrado (Turin, Teatro Regio, 1806)
- Pandolfo e Baloardo (libretto by Giuseppe Maria Foppa, Venice, Teatro San Moisè, 1807)
- L'amico dell'uomo (libretto by Giuseppe Maria Foppa, Novara, Teatro Nuovo, 1808)
- La donna (dama) soldato (comic opera, libretto by Caterino Mazzolà, Milan, Teatro alla Scala, 1808)
- L'uomo benefico (libretto by Giuseppe Maria Foppa, Turin, Teatro Regio, 1808)
- Il cicisbeo burlato (comic opera, libretto by Angelo Anelli, Milan, Teatro alla Scala, 1812)
- Il qui pro quo (opera buffa, libretto by Gaetano Rossi, Milan, Teatro di Santa Radegonda, 1812)
- Amore intraprendente (libretto by Giuseppe Maria Foppa, 1812)
- Zulema e Zelima (Venice, 1813)
- Rodrigo di Valenza (libretto by Felice Romani, Turin, Teatro Regio, 1820)
- Fedra (libretto by Luigi Romanelli, Padua, Teatro Nuovo, 1820)
