= Vincenzo Fabrizi =

Italian composer

Vincenzo Fabrizi (1764 – c. 1812) was an Italian composer of opera buffa.

Little is known of Fabrizi's life, perhaps because of his many journeys to various parts of Italy and Europe. He was born in Naples, in 1764 and studied under the guidance of Giacomo Tritto. The Neapolitan Carnival of 1783 saw his first premiere: the intermezzo I tre gobbi rivali. In 1786, he was appointed maestro di cappella at the University of Rome and later, in the same city, became director of the Teatro Capranica.

Some three years later, Fabrizi began to travel further afield to put on his works, spending time in Dresden, Lisbon, London and Madrid. Of his works about fifteen opera buffe are known, largely composed during the years 1783–1788.

Like Wolfgang Amadeus Mozart, Giuseppe Gazzaniga and Francesco Gardi he composed a version of Don Giovanni. It premiered in Rome, in 1787, under the title Il convitato di pietra.

== Works ==
A list of Fabrizi’s known works, together with genre, librettist, and date and place of first performance:

- I tre gobbi rivali (intermezzo, libretto by Carlo Goldoni, 1783, Naples)
- La ncessità non ha legge (opera buffa, 1784, Bologna)
- I due castellani burlati (opera buffa, libretto by Filippo Livigni, 1785, Bologna)
- La sposa invisibile (intermezzo, 1786, Rome)
- La contessa di Novara (opera buffa, libretto by Giovanni Bertati, 1786, Venice)
- L'amore per interesse (opera buffa, libretto by Giovanni Bertati, 1786, Padua)
- Chi la fa l'aspetti ossia I puntigli di gelosia (opera buffa, libretto by Filippo Livigni, 1786, Florence)
- La nobiltà villana (opera buffa, 1787, Rome)
- Gli amanti trappolieri (opera buffa, libretto by Giuseppe Palomba, 1787, Naples)
- Il convitato di pietra ossia il Don Giovanni (opera buffa, libretto by Giovanni Battista Lorenzi, 1787, Rome)
- Il viaggiatore sfortunato in amore (dramma giocoso, libretto by Bellani, 1787, Rome)
- Il caffè di Barcellona (opera buffa, 1788, Barcelona)
- Il Colombo e La scoperata delle Indie (farsa per musica, 1789, Rome)
- L'incontro per accidente ossia Il maestro di cappella (opera buffa, libretto by Giovanni Maria Diodati, 1788, Naples)
- Impresario in rovina (dramma giocoso, libretto by Antonio Piazza, 1797, Casale Monferrato).
