= Il mio tesoro =

Aria from Mozart's opera Don Giovanni

"Il mio tesoro" (or "Il mio tesoro intanto") is an aria for lyric tenor voice from scene 2 in act 2 of Mozart's opera Don Giovanni. It is often performed in recitals and featured in anthologies of music for tenor. In the aria, Don Ottavio, a young nobleman, urges the listener to assure his (the nobleman's) beloved fiancée, Donna Anna, that he intends to secure vengeance for her against the man who murdered her father.

== Libretto ==
Il mio tesoro
Anton Dermota, from a 1955 recording by Josef Krips and the Vienna State Opera

Il mio tesoro intanto
andate a consolar,
E del bel ciglio il pianto
cercate di asciugar.

Ditele che i suoi torti
a vendicar io vado;
Che sol di stragi e morti
nunzio vogl'io tornar.

My treasure, meanwhile,
Go and console.
And from her beautiful eyes, the tears,
Try to wipe away.

Tell her that the wrongs against her,
I'm going to avenge,
That only of killing and death
As announcer will I return.

== Music ==
The aria is set in B-flat major and in cut common time, with tempo indication of Andante grazioso. It is 101 bars long and takes about four minutes to perform. Its vocal range covers D3 to A4, while its tessitura is roughly F3 to G4. For most of the piece, the violins and violas play con sordino (with mutes) for a mellow effect. In addition to the strings, the aria uses clarinets in B-flat, bassoons and B♭ alto horns.

== In other media ==
A concert performance of "Il mio tesoro" is mentioned in the opening paragraphs of Tolstoy's novel Anna Karenina Excerpts from it are sung by the protagonist's father in the 1949 black comedy film Kind Hearts and Coronets.
