= Marcello Bernardini =

18th-century Italian composer and librettist

Marcello Bernardini (or Marcello da Capua; near Capua, 1730 or 1740 – around 1799) was an Italian composer and librettist. Little is known of him, save that he wrote 37 operas in his career. His father was most likely the composer Rinaldo di Capua.

== Operas ==
- La schiava astuta (intermezzo, 1765, Rome)
- La pescatrice (farsetta, 1768, Rome)
- Il Don Chisciotte della Mancia (dramma giocoso, libretto by Giovanni Battista Lorenzi, 1769, Turin)
- Il cavaliere errante (farsetta, libretto by Marcello Bernardini, 1770, Rome)
- La donna di spirito (farsetta, libretto by Marcello Bernardini, after that for La vedova scaltra by Carlo Goldoni, 1770, Rome)
- La molinara astuta (intermezzo, 1770, Rome)
- Amore in musica (opera buffa, 1773, Rome)
- La contessina (dramma giocoso, libretto by Marco Coltellini, after Carlo Goldoni, 1773, Rome)
- La bella forestiera ossia La viaggiatrice fortunata (farsetta, 1776, Rome)
- La finta sposa olandese (farsetta, 1777, Rome)
- L'isola incantata (intermezzo, 1778, Rome)
- L'ambizione delusa (intermezzo, 1779, Rome)
- Il bassà generoso (intermezzo, 1780, Rome)
- Il vecchio ringiovanito (intermezzo, 1781, Rome)
- Le vendette giocose ossia Il conte pasticcio (intermezzo, 1782, Rome)
- Il conte di bell'umore (intermezzo, 1783, Florence)
- La poetessa fanatica ossiano Li due gemelli (opera buffa, 1784, Rome)
- Li due Orfei (intermezzo, 1784, Rome)
- Le donne bisbetiche ossia L'antiquario fanatico (farsetta, libretto by Marcello Bernardini, 1785, Rome)
- Li muti per amore ossia La schiava fedele (farsetta, libretto by Marcello Bernardini, 1786, Florence)
- Gli amanti confusi ossia Il brutto fortunato (farsetta, 1786, Rome)
- La fonte d'aqua gialla ossia Il trionfo della pazzia (opera buffa, libretto by Marcello Bernardini, 1786, Rome)
- Barone a forza ossia il trionfo di Bacco (opera buffa, 1786, Florence)
- La fiera di Forlinpopoli (opera buffa, 1789, Rome)
- Gl'incontri stravaganti (opera buffa, 1790, Naples)
- L'ultima che si perde è la speranza (opera buffa, libretto by Francesco Saverio Zini, 1790, Naples)
- Il pazzo glorioso (opera buffa, libretto by Giovanni Bertati, 1790, Casalmaggiore)
- Pizzarro nell'Indie (opera seria, 1791, Naples)
- L'allegria della campagna (opera buffa, 1791, Naples)
- L'amore per incanto (opera buffa, 1791, Naples)
- La statua per puntiglio (opera buffa, 1792, Venice)
- Il conte brillante (opera buffa, 1792, Varese)
- Achille in Sciro (opera seria, libretto by Pietro Metastasio, 1794, Venice)
- La sposa polacca (dramma bernesco, libretto by Marcello Bernardini, 1796, Rome)
- Don Simoncino ossia Furberia e puntiglio (farsa giocosa, libretto by Giuseppe Maria Foppa, 1798, Venice)
- Le tre orfanelle ossia La scuola di musica (farsa, libretto by Giovanni Bertati, 1798, Venice)
- Il muto per astuzia (farsa giocosa, libretto by Giuseppe Maria Foppa, 1799, Venice)
