= Silvestro Palma =

Italian composer

Silvestro Palma sometimes De Palma or Da Palma (March 15, 1754 – August 8, 1834) was an Italian composer, primarily of operas.

He was born in Barano d'Ischia, was a student of Giovanni Paisiello, and collaborated on a number of works with Paisiello's friend Giovanni Battista Lorenzi. He died, aged 80, in Naples.
