= Luigi Bassi =

Italian opera singer

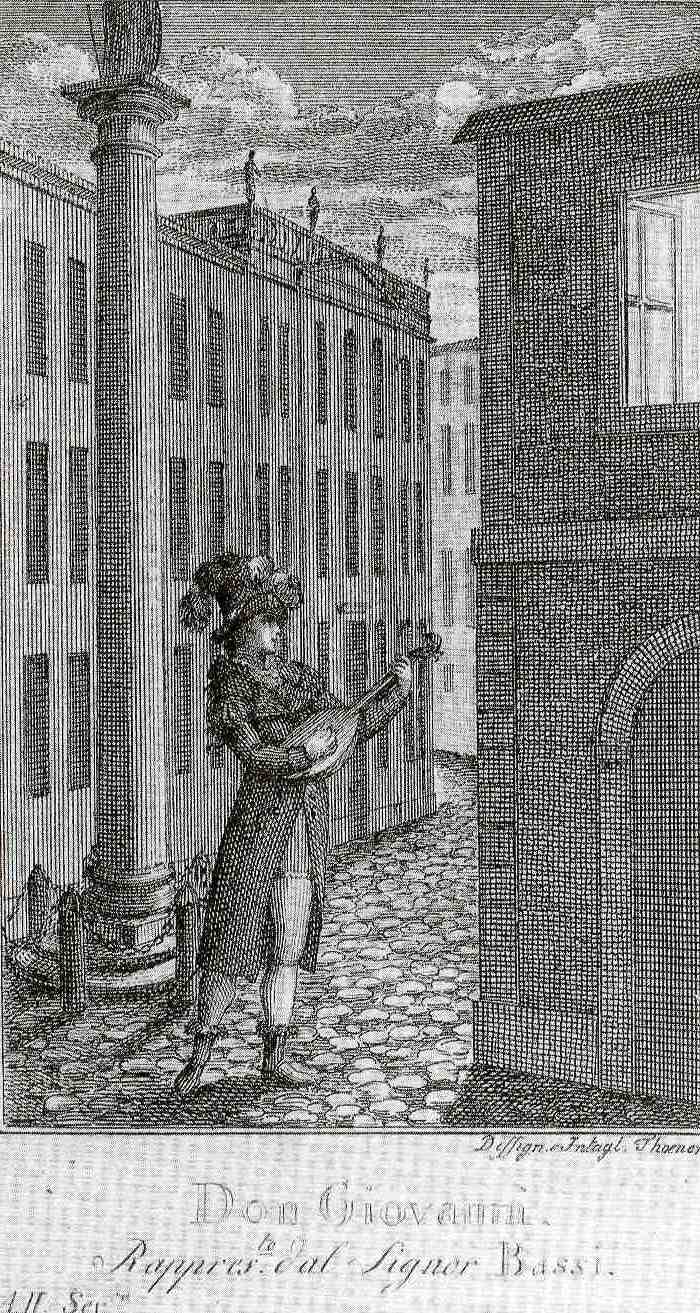
Luigi Bassi in the title role of Mozart's Don Giovanni in 1787

Luigi Bassi, Pesaro, 5 September 1766 – Dresden, 13 September 1825, was an Italian operatic baritone.

When writing his Life of Rossini, Stendhal tells of the time in 1813 when he met Bassi in Dresden and spoke of "Mr Mozart;" Bassi said he was entranced that someone should still refer to him as "Mr" Mozart. The affection he felt for the great master was thus clear to the casual visitor, but can also be understood from the importance of the roles he gave Bassi towards the end of his life.

At the age of just twenty, he sang the role of Count Almaviva at the Prague premiere of Mozart's Le nozze di Figaro, after which contemporaries said,

Bassi is also a very skilful actor, who handles tragedy without being absurd, and comedy without lapses of taste. When he is in a mischievous mood he will, for instance, parody the faults of the other singers so exquisitely that only the audience, not the singers, are aware of it... He never spoils a part.

The people of Prague were so happy with this performance of the opera composed by "Mozard" that they asked Domenico Guardasoni, impresario of the Prague National Theatre, to organise another opera. Guardasoni wrote to Da Ponte and work began on Don Giovanni. It was only natural that Bassi was called upon to sing again, and the role of Don Giovanni was written specially for him (with several joking references to the performance given the previous year). He did not like Finch'han dal vino, and asked Mozart to write another number where he could show off his vocal talents to the best; Mozart wrote Là ci darem la mano for Bassi, who is said to have forced five re-writes until he was satisfied.

Bassi moved to Leipzig, and there he sang Papageno in the Magic Flute in 1793, but shortly afterwards his singing ability had deteriorated (although his acting ability was as great as ever). A newspaper article said of him:

Bassi was an excellent singer before he lost his voice, and he still knows very well how to use what remains. It lies between tenor and bass, and though it sounds somewhat hollow, it is still very flexible, full and pleasant. Herr Bassi is furthermore a very skilled actor in tragedy with no trace of burlesque, and with no vulgarity or tastelessness in comedy. In his truly artful and droll way he can parody the faults of the other singers so subtly that only the audience notices and they themselves are unaware of it. His best roles are Axur, Don Giovanni, Teodoro, the Notary in La Molinara, the Count in Figaro, and others.

Bassi moved to Prague, but the war forced him to seek protection from Prince Lobkowitz, and he occasionally travelled to Vienna to sing. In 1814, he moved to Dresden, where he worked for the Italian company. He still sang Mozart roles, and he was popular with audiences, although his voice was beginning to fail. Until his death, he would occasionally travel to Italy for singing engagements, but in later life only sang sacred works.
