= Zotico (name) =

Zotico is an Italian male given name.

== Variations in other languages ==
- Catalan: Zòtic
- French: Zotique
- Ancient Greek: Ζωτικος (Zotikos)
- Latin: Zoticus
- Lithuanian: Zotikas
- Polish: Zotyk
- Portuguese: Zótico
- Spanish: Zotico

== Origins and diffusion ==
The name originates with the Latin variant Zoticus, which is based on its ancient Greek version: Ζωτικος (Zotikos); originally ζωτικος (zotikos), which means "full of life" or "life-giving". Hence the name shares a common root with the names Zosimo, Zoilo and Zoe, and therefore has a similar meaning to the name Vitale.

The name, in Italian, coincides with the term "zotico", which means "villain", "rough", "ignorant", "rude". Etymologists speculate that the name's meaning is related to "idiot".

== People ==
- Aurelio Avito Zotico, lover of Eligabalus
- Zotico (prefect of the praetorium), official of the Eastern Roman Empire
- Zotico of Constantinople, Roman saint
- Zotico of Nicomedia, Roman saint

== Name-day ==
Several saints have the name Zotico, hence the name-day can be celebrated on any of the following dates:

- 12 January, san Zotico, martyr of Tivoli
- 12 January, san Zotico, soldier and martyr with his comrades; Castolo, Modesto and Rogato as well as others during their services for the Church in Africa
- 10 February, san Zotico, martyr with Amanzio and other priests in Rome
- 11 February, san Zotico, martyr in Africa
- 21 July, san Zotico, bishop of Comana of Armenia and martyr
- 21 August, san Zotico, martyr with Agatonico and others in Selymbria (Tracia)
- 21 October, Zotico of Nicomedia, soldier and martyr with Caio, Dasio and others in Nicomedia
- 23 December, san Zotico, martyr in Gortyna
- 31 December, Zotico Of Constantinoples, priest and martyr in Constantinople

== Bibliography ==
- Burgio, Alfonso (1992). Dizionario dei nomi propri di persona. Roma: Hermes Edizioni. ISBN 88-7938-013-3.
- Ferrari, Claudio Ermanno (1830). "Vocabolario de' nomi proprj sustantivi tanto d'uomini che di femmine". In Carrer, Luigi; Federici, Fortunato (eds.). Dizionario della lingua italiana (in Italian). Vol. 7. Padua: Tipografia della Minerva. pp. 571–732.
- Nocentini, Alberto (2010). L'etimologico. Le Monnier. ISBN 978-88-00-20781-2.
