= Pasquale Cafaro =

Italian composer

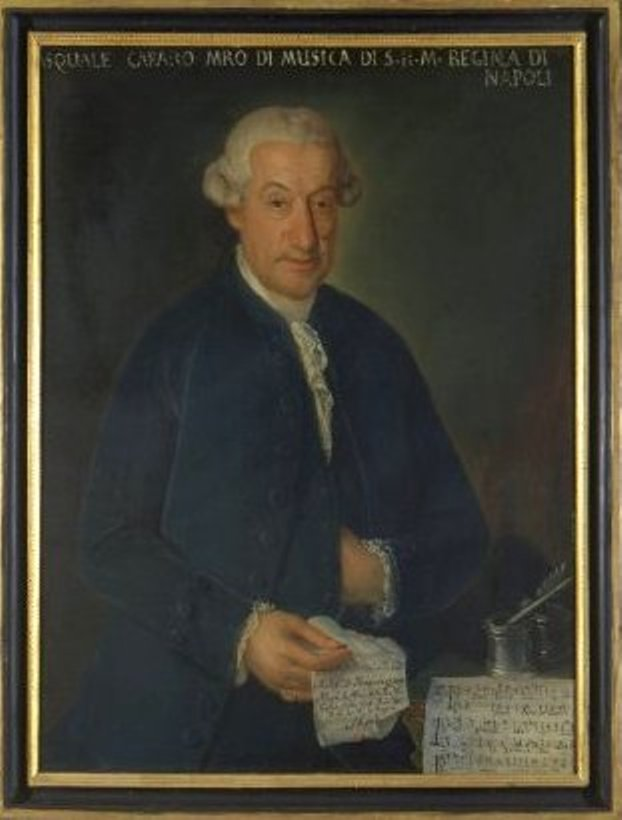
Pasquale Cafaro (1779)

Pasquale Cafaro (also known as Caffaro or Cafariello, 8 February 1715 or 1716 – 25 October 1787) was an Italian composer, who was particularly known for his operas and the significant amount of sacred music he produced, including oratorios, motets, and masses.

Born in San Pietro, Galatina, Cafaro entered the Conservatorio della Pietà dei Turchini in Naples in December 1735, where he was a pupil of Lorenzo Fago and Leonardo Leo. He remained in Naples for the rest of his life and taught at the conservatorio from 1759 until 1785. His most famous pupil was Giacomo Tritto.

In 1771, he succeeded Giuseppe de Majo as maestro di cappella of the Chapel Royal of Naples. Among his operatic works are Disfatta di Dario and L'Olimpiade. Cafaro died in Naples, aged 71 or 72 years.
