= Gaetano Monti (composer) =

Italian composer (1750–1816)

Gaetano Monti (born in Naples, c. 1750 – died there, c. 1816) was an Italian composer. His name is first recorded in 1758, when he was eight years old, singing in a small part in a performance of Il curioso del suo proprio danno by Niccolò Piccinni. His first opera, Adriano in Siria, was performed in Modena in 1775, and he was later named organist of the Treasury Chapel at Naples Cathedral; there he remained until 1788. Moreover, in 1776 he became an impresario at the Teatro San Carlo. Most of his works were opere buffe, and were seen in theatres in Rome, Venice, and Naples. His most popular works were Le donne vendicate and Lo studente. It was believed at one time that he was the brother of the poet Vincenzo Monti, but this is uncertain.

== Operas ==
- Adriano in Siria (opera seria, libretto by Pietro Metastasio, 1775, Modena)
- Il cicisbeo discacciato (opera buffa, 1777, Naples)
- La fuga (opera buffa, libretto by Giovanni Battista Lorenzi, 1777, Naples)
- Il geloso sincerato (opera buffa, libretto by Giovanni Battista Lorenzi, 1777, Naples)
- La contadina accorta (intermezzo, 1781, Rome)
- Le donne vendicate (opera buffa, libretto by Giuseppe Palomba, 1781, Naples)
- Il Molaforbice (opera buffa, libretto by Giuseppe Palomba, 1781, Naples)
- Lo sposalizio per dispetto (dramma giocoso, libretto by Giovanni Bertati, 1781, Venice)
- La viaggiatrice di bell'umore (intermezzo, 1782, Rome)
- Lo studente (opera buffa, libretto by Francesco Saverio Zini, 1783, Naples)
- La donna fedele (opera buffa, libretto by Francesco Saverio Zini, 1784, Naples)
