= Gennaro Astarita =

Italian composer

Gennaro Astarita (also spelled Astaritta) (c.1745–49 – 18 December 1805) was an Italian composer, mainly of operas. The place of his birth is unknown, although he was active in Naples for many years. He began his operatic career in 1765, collaborating with Niccolò Piccinni in the writing of the opera L'orfana insidiata. He became the maestro di cappella in Naples in 1770.

Astaritta is also considered to have played an important role in the development of opera in Russia. He first visited the country in 1781 and by 1784, he had become the director of Moscow's Petrovsky Theatre (the predecessor of the Bolshoi Theatre). In 1794, Prince Nicolai Yusupov, who at the time was the director of the Imperial Theatres in St Petersburg, asked him to bring an Italian opera troupe to the city, which he did in 1796. Astarita ran the troupe until 1799. Amongst the singers he recruited was Teresa Saporiti, who had created the role of Donna Anna in Mozart's Don Giovanni.

He wrote over 35 operas, most of them in the opera buffa genre. Although forgotten now, in their day they were well regarded and performed all over Italy, as well as in Germany, Austria, Spain, Portugal, and Russia. He also wrote ballet and sacred music.

He died at Rovereto.

== Operas ==
- Il corsaro algerino (opera buffa, libretto by Giuseppe Palomba, 1765, Naples)
- L'astuta cameriera (dramma giocoso, 1770, Turin)
- Gli amanti perseguitati (opera semi-seria, 1770, Turin)
- Il re alla caccia (1770, Torino)
- La critica teatrale (opera buffa, libretto by Ranieri de' Calzabigi, 1771, Turin)
- La contessa di Bimbimpoli (Il divertimento in campagna) (dramma giocoso, libretto by Giovanni Bertati, 1772, Venice (reprised as Il divertimento in campagna in Dresden, 1783)
- L'avaro in campagna (dramma giocoso, libretto by Giovanni Bertati, 1772, Turin)
- La tomba di Merlino (opera buffa, libretto by Giovanni Bertati, 1772, Turin)
- La contessina (dramma giocoso, libretto by Marco Coltellini, after Carlo Goldoni, 1772, Livorno)
- L'isola disabitata and Le cinesi (drammi per musica, libretto by Pietro Metastasio, 1773, Florence)
- Le finezze d'amore, o sia La farsa non si fa, ma si prova (farsa, libretto by Giovanni Bertati, 1773, Venice)
- Li astrologi immaginari (dramma giocoso, 1774, Lugo)
- Il marito che non ha moglie (dramma giocoso, libretto by Giovanni Bertati, 1774, Venice)
- Il principe ipocondriaco (dramma giocoso, libretto by Giovanni Bertati, 1774, Venice)
- La villanella incostante (dramma giocoso, Cortona, 1774)
- Il mondo della luna (dramma giocoso, libretto by Carlo Goldoni, 1775, Venice)
- Li sapienti ridicoli, ovvero Un pazzo ne fa cento (dramma giocoso, libretto di Giovanni Bertati, 1775, Prague)
- L'avaro (dramma giocoso, libretto by Giovanni Bertati, 1776, Ferrara)
- Armida (opera seria, libretto by Giovanni Ambrogio Migliavacca and Giacomo Durazzo, 1777, Venice)
- La dama immaginaria (dramma giocoso, libretto by Pier Antonio Bagliacca, 1777, Venice)
- L'isola del Bengodi (dramma giocoso, libretto by Carlo Goldoni, 1777, Venice)
- Il marito indolente (dramma giocoso, 1778, Bologna)
- Le discordie teatrali (dramma giocoso, 1779, Florence)
- Il francese bizzarro (dramma giocoso, 1779, Milan)
- Nicoletto bellavita (opera buffa, 1779, Treviso)
- La Didone abbandonata (opera seria, libretto by Pietro Metastasio, 1780, Bratislava)
- Il diavolo a quattro (farsa, 1785, Naples)
- I capricci in amore (dramma giocoso, 1787, St. Petersburg)
- Il curioso accidente (dramma giocoso, libretto by Giovanni Bertati, 1789, Venice)
- Ipermestra (opera seria, libretto by Pietro Metastasio, 1789, Venice)
- L'inganno del ritratto (dramma giocoso, 1791, Florence)
- La nobiltà immaginaria (intermezzo, 1791, Florence)
- Il medico parigino o sia L'ammalato per amore (dramma giocoso, libretto by Giuseppe Palomba, 1792, Venice)
- Le fallaci apparenze (dramma giocoso, libretto by Giovanni Battista Lorenzi, 1793, Venice)
- Rinaldo d'Asti (opera buffa, libretto by Giuseppe Carpani, 1796, St. Petersburg)
- Gl'intrighi per amore (opera buffa, 1796, St. Petersburg)

== Sources ==
- Casaglia, Gherardo (2005). "Astarita". L'Almanacco di Gherardo Casaglia (in Italian).
- Randel, Don Michael (ed.), The Harvard Biographical Dictionary of Music, Harvard University Press, 1996 p. 785. ISBN 0-674-37299-9
- Warrack, John; West, Ewan (1996). "Astarita, Gennaro". The Concise Oxford Dictionary of Opera. Oxford University Press.

== See also ==
- List of opera genres
