= Caterina Bondini =

Italian opera singer

Caterina Saporiti Bondini (1757 – after 1791) was an Italian opera singer. She was engaged in the Estates Theatre in Prague from 1784 until 1791, where she performed important roles in operas by Mozart.

By 1773, Caterina had married the impresario Pasquale Bondini and she was a popular soprano in her husband's company in the mid-1780s. The couple had five children, only two of whom lived to adulthood, among them the soprano Marianna Bondini Barilli Caterina sang Susanna in the first Prague production of Le nozze di Figaro in early December 1786, and on 14 December a performance was given for her benefit.
