= Giuseppe Carpani =

Italian writer (1752–1825)

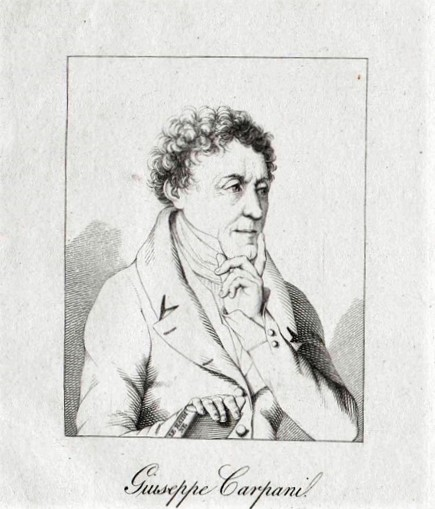
Giuseppe Carpani

Giuseppe Carpani (28 January 1752 – 22 January 1825) was an Italian man of letters. He is remembered in large part for his role in the history of classical music: he knew Haydn, Mozart, Salieri, Beethoven, and Rossini, and served them in various ways as poet, translator, and biographer.

== Life ==
He was born at Vill'albese, in Brianza, Duchy of Milan (in what is now Lombardy) and was educated in Milan by the Jesuits. His father wanted him to study law, which he did in Pavia. Already during his studies, he turned to literature on his own time, writing poetry and plays, some in standard Italian and some in Milanese dialect. An early success (1780) was Gli antiquari in Palmira, an opera composed by Giacomo Rust to Carpani's libretto, which led to his being invited to write libretti for the Milanese court, performed in the country residence at Monza. These were translations/revisions of French works, some of which appeared under Carpani's own name.

From 1792 to 1796, Carpani edited the Gazzetta di Milano. This was the historical period in which Napoleon's conquests in Italy began, and Carpani wrote some sharply anti-French pieces in the journal. In 1796, the French occupied Milan, and Carpani, needing to leave, fled to Vienna. In 1797, he was nominated to serve as became censor and stage director in the theaters of Venice, but apparently remained in Vienna.

Carpani was a "passionate royalist", supporting the (at the time, highly repressive) imperial Austrian government by working as an internal spy. He sent his reports (written in French) to his superiors in the Police and Censorship Office, Baron Hager and later Count Sedlnitzky. Eventually, Carpani received a pension from the Emperor.

Carpani was acquainted with Ludwig van Beethoven and in 1822 apparently mediated the only visit to Beethoven by Gioachino Rossini. He interpreted the conversation (in one direction: on paper, since Beethoven was totally deaf at the time). Beethoven received Rossini politely and expressed praise for his comic operas (which were, at the time, greatly eclipsing Beethoven's work in popularity in Vienna). Rossini, who admired Beethoven greatly, later expressed sorrow over the squalor of his surroundings and the "indefinable sadness spread over his features".

In August 1824, the aging Carpani marshaled his efforts in defense of the composer Antonio Salieri, at a time when the story that Salieri had poisoned Wolfgang Amadeus Mozart was circulating broadly. Carpani obtained testimony from Guldener von Lobes, a doctor who was close to those treating the dying Mozart, and from two nurses who had attended Mozart. Carpani published his findings in an Italian journal. They constitute part of the evidence on the basis of which the poisoning myth is generally discredited today.

Carpani died of natural causes in the smaller Liechtenstein Palace in Vienna at the age of 73.

== Works ==
=== Verse and libretti ===
He published a number of translations of French and German operas, and also wrote an oratorio on La passione di Gesù Christo, which was set to music by Joseph Weigl, and performed in 1808, in the palace of Prince Lobkowitz, and in 1821 by the Gesellschaft der Musikfreunde. He translated Haydn's The Creation into Italian, and wrote a sonnet on the celebrated performance of that work at which Haydn was present the year before his death. This sonnet was set to music for four voices and orchestra by Antonio Salieri in 1820.

In 1808, composers were invited to set his poem "In questa tomba oscura". Of the 63 composers who did so, only Beethoven created a setting that is still popular today (WoO 133, 1807).

=== His Haydn biography ===
Carpani was a great admirer of Haydn, and published a book about him and his compositions entitled Le Haydine. The work is fairly thin concerning facts about the composer, and has many long passages expressing Carpani's critical opinions; Jones calls it "a garrulous account of the composer's life with large digressions on the perceived significance of his music." The book is generally considered unreliable as a factual source. To give one example, Carpani asserts that Haydn did not bring his mistress Luigia Polzelli to London with him in his journey of 1791 because she had died; in fact, she lived on for decades, was the recipient of letters from Haydn, and received a small pension from him. Gidwitz (n.d.) calls the Carpani biography "somewhat fictionalized;" Heartz says, "his credibility does not extend beyond what he actually witnessed."

Carpani's Haydn biography was plagiarized anonymously by the French writer Stendhal. In a public letter Carpani denounced his plagiarist, calling him "a literary cuckoo who does not lay his egg in another's nest but warms eggs he has not laid."

=== Rossini ===
Carpani later conceived a great enthusiasm for the work of Rossini and wrote a book about him called Le Rossiniane (Carpani 1824).

=== Books by Carpani ===
- Carpani, Giuseppe (1812) Le Haydine, ovvero Lettere su la vita e le opere del celebre maestro Giuseppe Haydn. Milan.
- Carpani, Giuseppe (1824) Le rossiniane ossia Lettere musico-teatrali. Padua.

== References and links ==
- Branscombe, Peter (1990) Review of Helmut C. Jacobs (1988) Literatur, Musik und Gesellschaft in Italien und Oesterreich in der Epoche Napoleons und der Restauration. Studien zu Giuseppe Carpani (1751–1825). Frankfurt: Lang. In The Modern Language Review 85:257–258.
- Clive, Peter (2001) Beethoven and His World: A Biographical Dictionary. Oxford: Oxford University Press.
- Gidwitz, Patricia Lewy (no date) "Giuseppe Carpani," article in Grove Music Online, published by Oxford University Press. Accessed 4 October 2012.
- Heartz, Daniel (2009) Mozart, Haydn and Early Beethoven, 1781–1802. New York: W. W. Norton & Company.
- Jones, David Wyn (ed., 2009) Oxford Composer Companions: Haydn, article "Carpani, Giuseppe". The article is by David Wyn Jones.
- Pohl, C. Ferdinand (1900) "Carpani, Giuseppe". Article in the first edition of the Grove Dictionary of Music and Musicians. Available on line at .
- Sonneck, Oscar (1926) Beethoven: Impressions by His Contemporaries. New York: G. Schirmer.
- Stafford, William (1993) The Mozart Myths: A Critical Reassessment. Stanford, CA: Stanford University Press.
- Steblin, Rita (2009) "Vienna", in David Wyn Jones, ed., Oxford Composer Companions: Haydn. Oxford: Oxford University Press.
