= Don Giovanni =

1787 opera by Wolfgang Amadeus Mozart

- Opera by W. A. Mozart
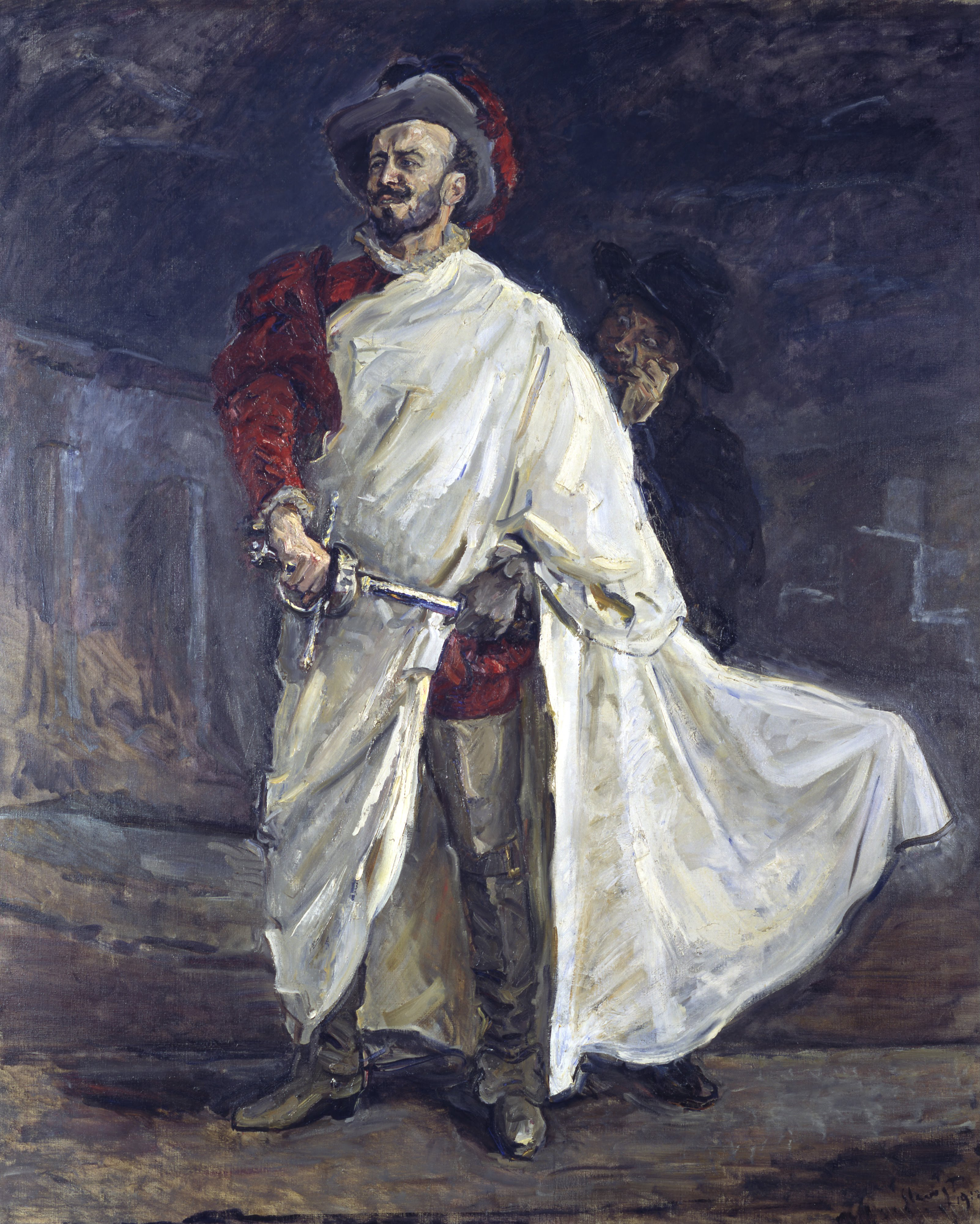
- Portrait of Francisco D'Andrade in the title role by Max Slevogt, 1912
- Other title: Il dissoluto punito, ossia il Don Giovanni
- Librettist: Lorenzo Da Ponte
- Language: Italian
- Based on: Don Giovanni Tenorio, libretto by Giovanni Bertati
- Premiere: 29 October 1787; Estates Theatre, Prague

Don Giovanni (Italian pronunciation: [ˈdɔn dʒoˈvanni]; K. 527; full title: Il dissoluto punito, ossia il Don Giovanni, literally 'The Rake Punished, or Don Giovanni') is an opera in two acts with music by Wolfgang Amadeus Mozart to an Italian libretto by Lorenzo Da Ponte. Its subject is a centuries-old Spanish legend about a libertine, Don Juan, as told by playwright Tirso de Molina in his 1630 play El burlador de Sevilla y convidado de piedra. It is a dramma giocoso blending comedy, melodrama and supernatural elements (although the composer entered it into his catalogue simply as opera buffa). It was premiered by the Prague Italian opera at the National Theatre (of Bohemia), now called the Estates Theatre, on 29 October 1787. (Note: The theatre is referred to as the Teatro di Praga in the libretto for the 1787 premiere (Deutsch 1965, pp. 302–303); for the current name of the theatre see "The Estates Theatre" Archived 27 September 2011 at the Wayback Machine at the Prague National Theatre website.) Don Giovanni is regarded as one of the greatest operas of all time and has proved a fruitful subject for commentary in its own right; critic Fiona Maddocks has described it as one of Mozart's "trio of masterpieces with librettos by Da Ponte".

== Composition and premiere ==
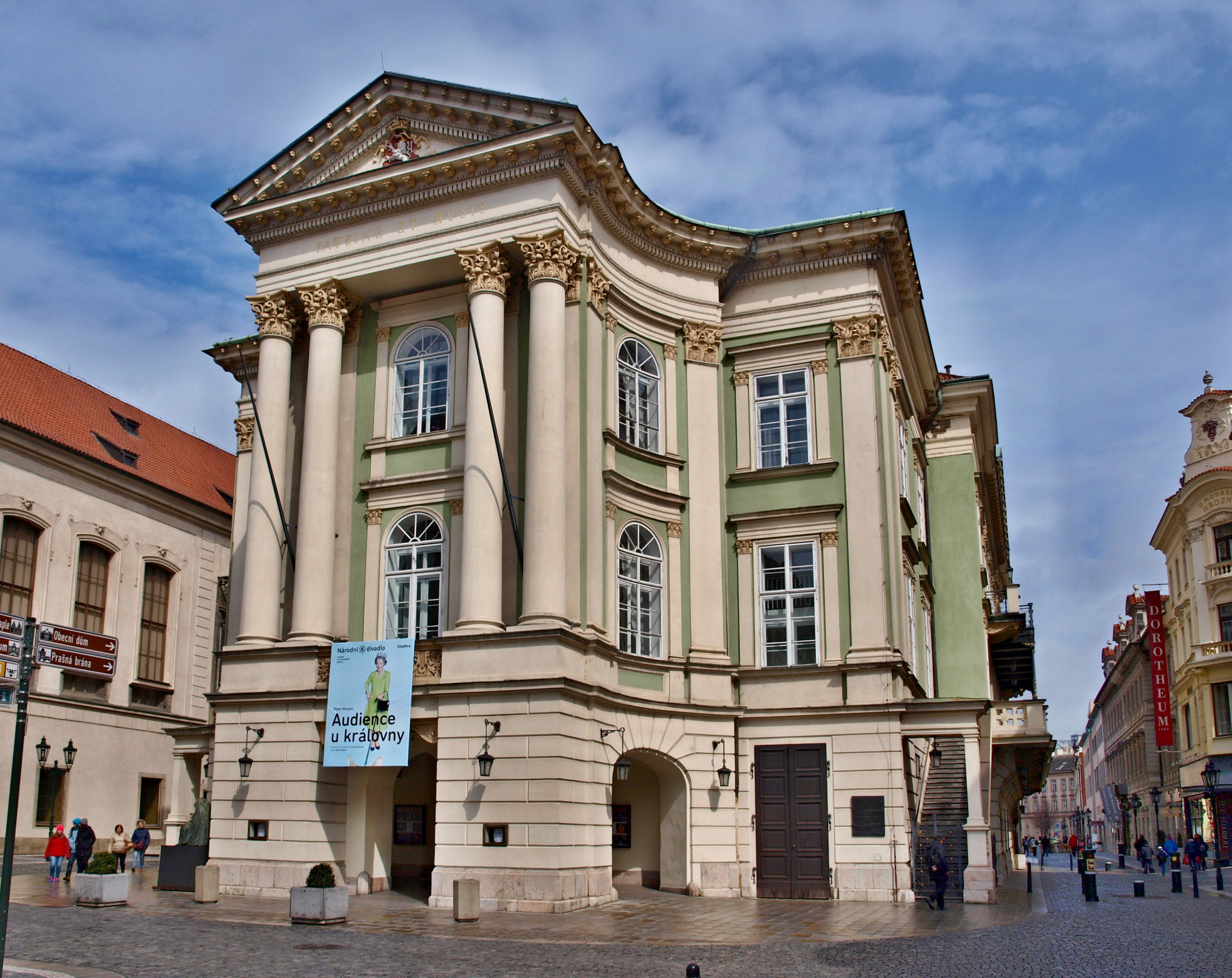
The Estates Theatre in Prague, venue of the world premiere of Don Giovanni in 1787. The theatre had opened four years earlier as the Comital Nostitz National Theatre (Gräflich Nostitzsches Nationaltheater).

The opera was commissioned after the success of Mozart's trip to Prague in January and February 1787. The subject may have been chosen because the sub-genre of Don Juan opera originated in that city. Lorenzo Da Ponte's libretto is based on Giovanni Bertati's for the opera Don Giovanni Tenorio, which premiered in Venice early in 1787. In two aspects he copied Bertati: by opening with the Commendatore's murder and by avoiding mention of Seville (for Bertati the setting was Villena, Spain; Da Ponte simply writes "city in Spain").

The opera was supposed to premiere on 14 October 1787 for Archduchess Maria Theresa of Austria's visit, but it was not ready in time and Le nozze di Figaro was substituted. Mozart recorded its completion, finally, on 28 October, the night before the premiere (29 October).

The opera was rapturously received, as was often true of Mozart's work in Prague. The Prager Oberpostamtzeitung reported, "Connoisseurs and musicians say that Prague has never heard the like", and "the opera ... is extremely difficult to perform." The Provincialnachrichten of Vienna reported, "Herr Mozart conducted in person and was welcomed joyously and jubilantly by the numerous gathering."

=== Scoring ===
The score calls for double woodwinds, two horns, two trumpets, three trombones (at the end of act 2 only, alto, tenor, bass), timpani, basso continuo for the recitatives, and the usual string section. The composer also specified occasional special musical effects. For the ballroom scene at the end of the first act, Mozart calls for two onstage ensembles to play separate dance music in synchronization with the pit orchestra, each of the three groups playing in its own metre (a 3/4 minuet, a 2/4 contradanse and a fast 3/8 peasant dance), accompanying the dancing of the principal characters. In act 2, Giovanni is seen to play the mandolin, accompanied by pizzicato strings. In the same act, two of the Commendatore's interventions ("Di rider finirai pria dell'aurora" and "Ribaldo, audace, lascia a' morti la pace") are accompanied by a wind chorale of oboes, clarinets, bassoons, and trombones (with cellos and basses playing from the string section).

=== Revision for Vienna ===
Playbill for the 1788 Vienna premiere of Don Giovanni

Mozart also supervised the Vienna premiere of the work, which took place on 7 May 1788. For this production, he wrote two new arias with corresponding recitatives – Don Ottavio's aria "Dalla sua pace" (K. 540a, composed on 24 April for the tenor Francesco Morella), Elvira's aria "In quali eccessi ... Mi tradì quell'alma ingrata" (K. 540c, composed on 30 April for the soprano Caterina Cavalieri) – and the duet between Leporello and Zerlina "Per queste tue manine" (K. 540b, composed on 28 April). He also made some cuts in the Finale in order to make it shorter and more incisive, the most important of which is the section where Anna and Ottavio, Elvira, Zerlina and Masetto, Leporello reveal their plans for the future ("Or che tutti, o mio tesoro"). In order to connect "Ah, certo è l'ombra che l'incontrò" ("It must have been the ghost she met") directly to the moral of the story "Questo è il fin di chi fa mal" ("This is the end which befalls to evildoers"), Mozart composed a different version of "Resti dunque quel birbon fra Proserpina e Pluton!" ("So the wretch can stay down there with Proserpina and Pluto!"). These cuts are very seldom performed in theatres or recordings.

=== Later performance traditions ===
The opera's final ensemble was generally omitted until the early 20th century, a tradition that apparently began very early on. According to the 19th-century Bohemian memoirist Wilhelm Kuhe, the final ensemble was only presented at the first performance in Prague, then never heard again during the original run. It does not appear in the Viennese libretto of 1788; thus the ending of the first performance in Vienna without the ensemble as depicted in the film Amadeus may be an accurate portrayal. Nonetheless, the final ensemble is almost invariably performed in full today.

Modern productions sometimes include both the original aria for Don Ottavio, "Il mio tesoro", and its replacement from the first production in Vienna that was crafted to suit the capabilities of the tenor Francesco Morella, "Dalla sua pace". Elvira's "In quali eccessi, o Numi ... Mi tradì quell'alma ingrata" is usually retained as well. The duet "Per queste tue manine" and the whole accompanying scene involving Zerlina and Leporello from the Viennese version is almost never included.

Although the same singer played both Masetto and the Commendatore roles in both the Prague and Vienna premieres, in modern-day productions, the roles are typically taken by different singers (unless limited by such things as finance or rehearsal time and space). The final scene's chorus of demons after the Commendatore's exit gives the singer time for a costume change before entering as Masetto for the sextet, though not much time.

== Roles ==
Roles, voice types, premiere casts
Role	Voice type	Prague premiere cast, 29 October 1787 Conductor: W. A. Mozart	Vienna premiere cast, 7 May 1788 Conductor: W. A. Mozart
Don Giovanni, a young, extremely licentious nobleman	baritone	Luigi Bassi	Francesco Albertarelli
Il Commendatore	bass	Giuseppe Lolli	Francesco Bussani
Donna Anna, his daughter, promised in marriage to Don Ottavio	soprano	Teresa Saporiti	Aloysia Weber (Note: Aloysia Weber, Mozart's sister-in-law, frequently sang in his works.)
Don Ottavio	tenor	Antonio Baglioni	Francesco Morella
Donna Elvira, a lady of Burgos abandoned by Don Giovanni	soprano	Katherina Micelli	Caterina Cavalieri (Note: Caterina Cavalieri was the first Konstanze in Die Entführung aus dem Serail.)
Leporello, Don Giovanni's servant	bass	Felice Ponziani	Francesco Benucci (Note: Francesco Benucci was the first Figaro in Le nozze di Figaro.)
Masetto, a peasant, in love with Zerlina	bass	Giuseppe Lolli	Francesco Bussani
Zerlina, a peasant	soprano	Caterina Bondini	Luisa Mombelli
Chorus: peasants, servants, young ladies, musicians, demons

== Instrumentation ==
The instrumentation is:

- Woodwinds: two flutes, two oboes, two clarinets and two bassoons
- Brass: two horns, two trumpets, three trombones (trombones in act 2 only)
- Percussion: timpani
- Strings: first violins, second violins, violas, cellos and double basses
- Basso continuo (harpsichord and violoncello)
- Mandolin

== Synopsis ==
Don Giovanni, a young, arrogant, and sexually promiscuous nobleman, abuses and outrages everyone else in the cast until he encounters something he cannot kill, beat up, dodge, or outwit.

=== Act 1 ===
Overture
Fulda Symphonic Orchestra

"Notte e giorno faticar", "Non sperar, se non m'uccidi"
Fernando Corena (Leporello), Suzanne Danco (Donna Anna), Cesare Siepi (Don Giovanni); Vienna Philharmonic, Josef Krips (1955)

The overture begins with a thundering D minor cadence, followed by a short misterioso sequence which leads into a light-hearted D major allegro.

The garden of the Commendatore

Leporello, Don Giovanni's servant, grumbles about his demanding master and daydreams about being free of him ("Notte e giorno faticar" – "Night and day I slave away"). He is keeping watch while Don Giovanni is in the Commendatore's house attempting to seduce the Commendatore's daughter, Donna Anna. (Note: In the absence of an unambiguous indication in Da Ponte's libretto, it is reasonable to interpret this incident variously. However, in a discussion of the literary tradition available to Da Ponte as detailed in Freeman 2021, pp. 254–262, it is clear that there was no precedent for the portrayal of Don Juan as a rapist in the literary tradition that extended from Da Ponte's time back to the prototype Don Juan drama, Tirso de Molina's early seventeenth-century play El burlador de Sevilla. Da Ponte's scene at the beginning of the opera is based on a standard scenario of earlier dramas in which Don Juan attempts to seduce a noblewoman in disguise as her lover, one of his standard burlas (or "tricks" of seduction). Besides no precedent for rape, there is also no portrayal in the Don Juan literature before Da Ponte of impregnation or the contraction of venereal disease in spite of Don Juan's numberless sexual encounters.) Don Giovanni enters the garden from inside the house, pursued by Donna Anna. Don Giovanni is masked and Donna Anna tries to hold him and to unmask him, shouting for help. (Trio: "Non sperar, se non m'uccidi, Ch'io ti lasci fuggir mai!" – "Do not hope, unless you kill me, that I shall ever let you run away!"). He breaks free and she runs off as the Commendatore enters the garden. The Commendatore blocks Don Giovanni's path and forces him to fight a duel. Don Giovanni kills the Commendatore with his sword and escapes with Leporello. Donna Anna, returning with her fiancé, Don Ottavio, is horrified to see her father lying dead in a pool of his own blood. She makes Don Ottavio swear vengeance against the unknown murderer. (Duet: "Ah, vendicar, se il puoi, giura quel sangue ognor!" – "Ah, swear to avenge that blood if you can!")

A public square outside Don Giovanni's palace

"Madamina, il catalogo è questo"
Fernando Corena, Vienna Philharmonic, Josef Krips (1955)

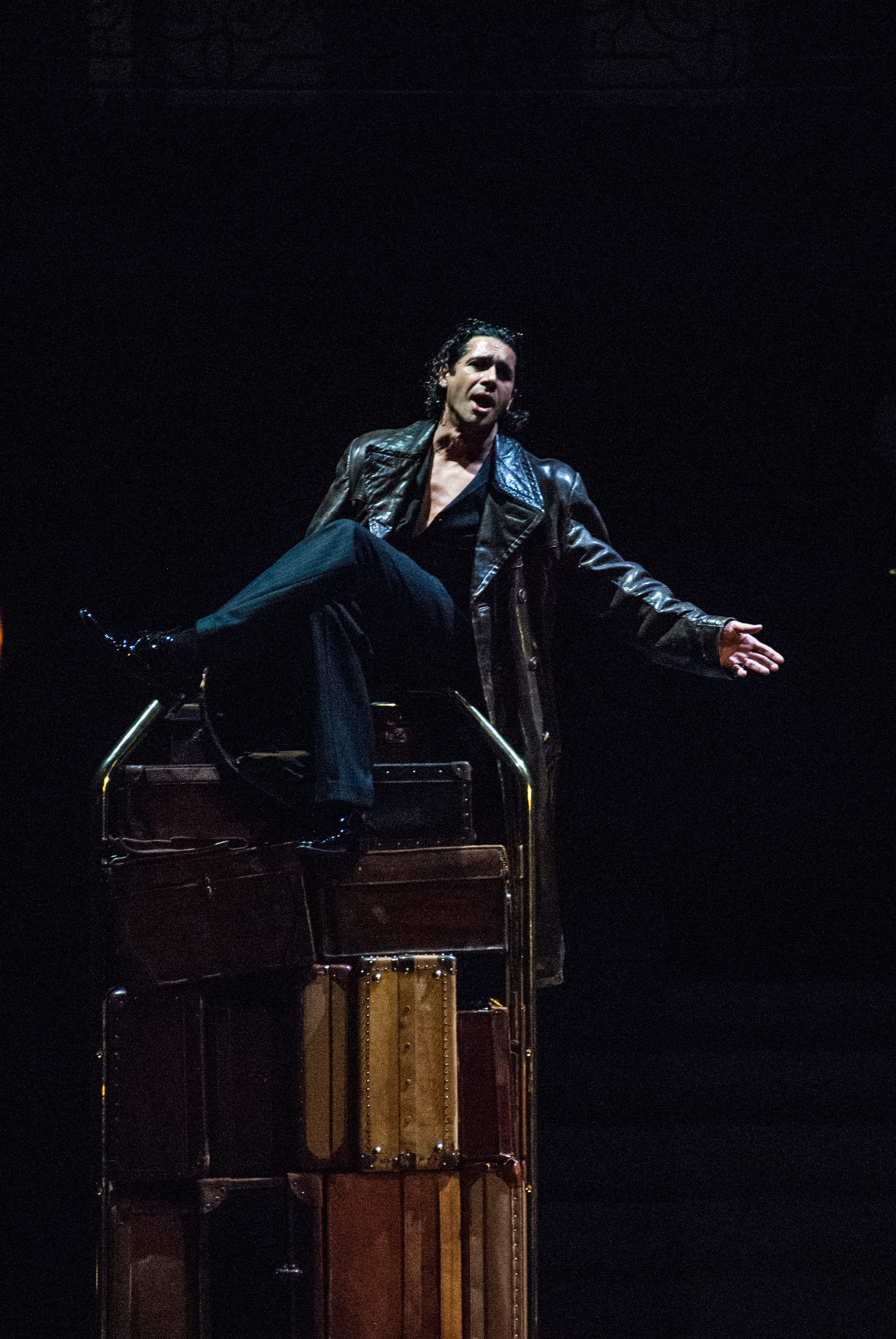
Ildebrando D'Arcangelo as Don Giovanni, Salzburg Festival 2014

Leporello tells Don Giovanni that he (Giovanni) is leading a rotten life; Don Giovanni reacts angrily. They hear a woman (Donna Elvira) singing of having been abandoned by her lover, on whom she is seeking revenge ("Ah, chi mi dice mai" – "Ah, who could ever tell me"). Don Giovanni starts to flirt with her, but it turns out he is the former lover she is seeking. The two recognise each other and she reproaches him bitterly. He shoves Leporello forward, ordering him to tell Donna Elvira the truth about him, and then hurries away.

Leporello tells Donna Elvira that Don Giovanni is not worth her feelings for him. He is unfaithful to everyone; his conquests include 640 women and girls in Italy, 231 in Germany, 100 in France, 91 in Turkey, but in Spain, 1,003 ("Madamina, il catalogo è questo" – "My dear lady, this is the catalogue"). In a frequently cut recitative, Donna Elvira vows vengeance.

The open country

A marriage procession with Masetto and Zerlina enters. Don Giovanni and Leporello arrive soon after. Don Giovanni is immediately attracted to Zerlina, and he attempts to remove the jealous Masetto by offering to host a wedding celebration at his castle. On realising that Don Giovanni means to remain behind with Zerlina, Masetto becomes angry ("Ho capito! Signor, sì" – "I understand! Yes, my lord!") but is forced to leave. Don Giovanni and Zerlina are soon alone and he immediately begins his seductive arts (Duet: "Là ci darem la mano" – "There we will entwine our hands").

"Dalla sua pace"
Anton Dermota, Vienna Philharmonic, Josef Krips (1955)

"Champagne Aria"
Cesare Siepi, Vienna Philharmonic, Josef Krips (1955)

Donna Elvira arrives and thwarts the seduction ("Ah, fuggi il traditor" – "Flee from the traitor!"). She leaves with Zerlina. Don Ottavio and Donna Anna enter, plotting vengeance on the still unknown killer of Donna Anna's father. Donna Anna, unaware that she is speaking to her attacker, pleads for Don Giovanni's help. Don Giovanni, relieved that he is unrecognised, readily promises it, and asks who has disturbed her peace. Before she can answer, Donna Elvira returns and tells Donna Anna and Don Ottavio that Don Giovanni is a false-hearted seducer. Don Giovanni tries to convince Don Ottavio and Donna Anna that Donna Elvira is insane (Quartet: "Non ti fidar, o misera" – "Don't trust him, oh sad one"). As Don Giovanni leaves, Donna Anna suddenly recognises him as her father's murderer and tells Don Ottavio the story of his intrusion, claiming that she was deceived at first because she was expecting a night visit from Don Ottavio himself, but managed to fight Don Giovanni off after discovering the impostor (long recitative exchange between Donna Anna and Don Ottavio). She repeats her demand that he avenge her and points out that he will be avenging himself as well (aria: "Or sai chi l'onore Rapire a me volse" – "Now you know who wanted to rob me of my honour"). In the Vienna version, Don Ottavio, not yet convinced (Donna Anna having only recognised Don Giovanni's voice, not seen his face), resolves to keep an eye on his friend ("Dalla sua pace la mia dipende" – "On her peace my peace depends").

Leporello informs Don Giovanni that all the guests of the peasant wedding are in Don Giovanni's house and that he distracted Masetto from his jealousy, but that Zerlina, returning with Donna Elvira, made a scene and spoiled everything. However, Don Giovanni remains cheerful and tells Leporello to organise a party and invite every girl he can find. (Don Giovanni's "Champagne Aria": "Fin ch'han dal vino calda la testa" – "Till they are tipsy"). They hasten to his palace.

A garden outside Don Giovanni's palace

"Batti, batti, o bel Masetto"
Hilde Güden, Vienna Philharmonic, Josef Krips (1955)

Zerlina follows the jealous Masetto and tries to pacify him ("Batti, batti o bel Masetto" – "Beat, O beat me, handsome Masetto"), but just as she manages to persuade him of her innocence, Don Giovanni's voice from offstage startles and frightens her. Masetto hides, resolving to see for himself what Zerlina will do when Don Giovanni arrives. Zerlina tries to hide from Don Giovanni, but he finds her and attempts to continue the seduction, until he stumbles upon Masetto's hiding place. Confused but quickly recovering, Don Giovanni reproaches Masetto for leaving Zerlina alone, and returns her temporarily to him. Don Giovanni then leads both offstage to his ballroom. Three masked guests – the disguised Don Ottavio, Donna Anna, and Donna Elvira – enter the garden. From a balcony, Leporello invites them to his master's party. They accept the invitation and Leporello leaves the balcony. Alone, Don Ottavio and Donna Anna pray for protection, Donna Elvira for vengeance (Trio: "Protegga il giusto cielo" – "May the just heavens protect us").

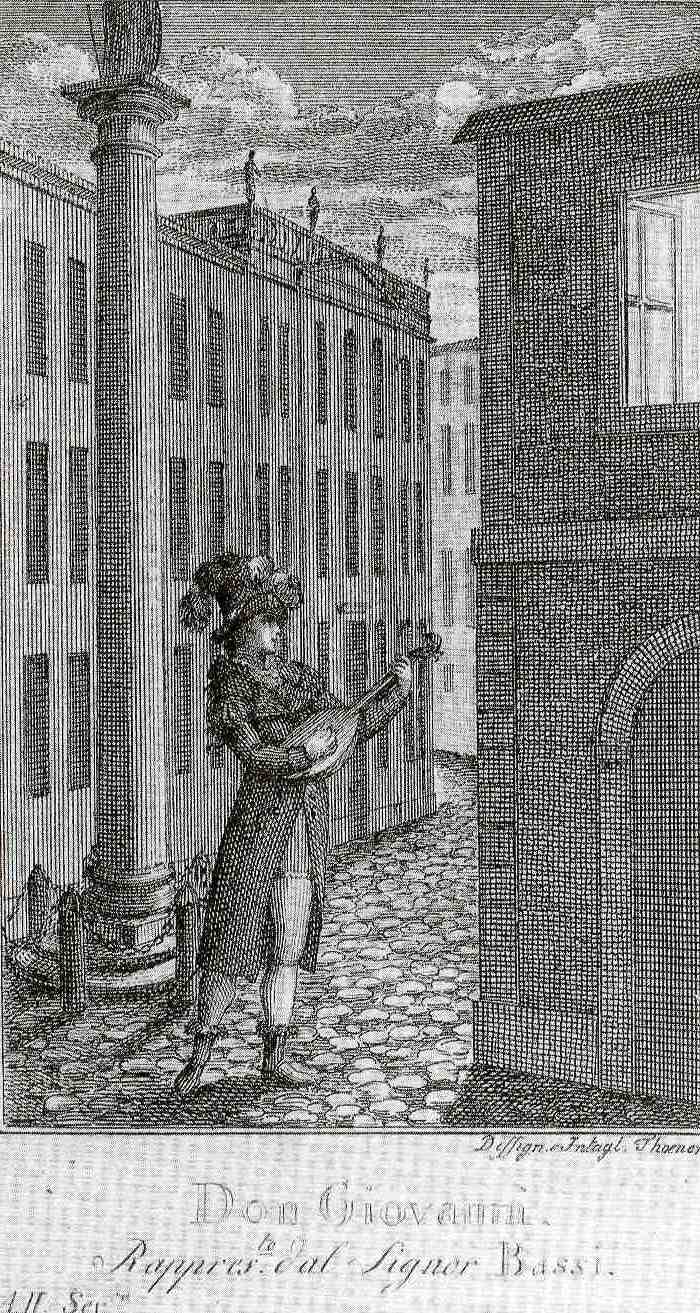
Luigi Bassi in the title role of Don Giovanni in 1787. The mandolin music for the premiere performance was played by J. B. Kucharz.

Don Giovanni's ballroom

As the merriment, featuring three separate chamber orchestras on stage, proceeds, Leporello distracts Masetto by dancing with him, while Don Giovanni leads Zerlina offstage to a private room and tries to assault her. When Zerlina screams for help, Don Giovanni drags Leporello onstage from the room, accuses Leporello of assaulting Zerlina himself, and threatens to kill him. The others are not fooled. Don Ottavio produces a pistol and points it at Don Giovanni, and the three guests unmask and declare that they know all. But despite being denounced and menaced from all sides, Don Giovanni remains calm and escapes – for the moment.

=== Act 2 ===
Outside Donna Elvira's house

"Deh, vieni alla finestra"
Cesare Siepi, Vienna Philharmonic, Josef Krips (1955)

Leporello threatens to leave Don Giovanni, but his master calms him with a peace offering of money (Duet: "Eh via buffone" – "Go on, fool"). Wanting to seduce Donna Elvira's maid, and believing that she will trust him better if he appears in lower-class clothes, Don Giovanni orders Leporello to exchange cloak and hat with him. Donna Elvira comes to her window (Trio: "Ah taci, ingiusto core" – "Ah, be quiet unjust heart"). Seeing an opportunity for a game, Don Giovanni hides and sends Leporello out in the open wearing Don Giovanni's cloak and hat. From his hiding place Don Giovanni sings a promise of repentance, expressing a desire to return to her and threatening to kill himself if she does not take him back, while Leporello poses as Don Giovanni and tries to keep from laughing. Donna Elvira, convinced, descends to the street. Leporello, continuing to pose as Don Giovanni, leads her away to keep her occupied while Don Giovanni serenades her maid with his mandolin. ("Deh, vieni alla finestra" – "Ah, come to the window").

Before Don Giovanni can complete his seduction of the maid, Masetto and his friends arrive, looking for Don Giovanni in order to kill him. Don Giovanni poses as Leporello (whose clothes he is still wearing) and joins the posse, pretending that he also hates Don Giovanni. After cunningly dispersing Masetto's friends (Don Giovanni aria: "Metà di voi qua vadano" – "Half of you go this way. the others, go that way"), Don Giovanni takes Masetto's weapons away, beats him up, and runs off, laughing. Zerlina arrives and consoles the bruised and battered Masetto ("Vedrai carino" – "You'll see, dear one").

A dark courtyard

Sextet: "Sola, sola in buio loco"
Vienna Philharmonic, Josef Krips (1955)

"In quali eccessi ... Mi tradì quell'alma ingrata"
Lisa Della Casa, Vienna Philharmonic, Josef Krips (1955)

Leporello abandons Donna Elvira. (Sextet: "Sola, sola in buio loco" – "All alone in this dark place"). As he tries to escape, he bumps into Don Ottavio and Donna Anna. Zerlina and Masetto also enter the scene. Everyone mistakes Leporello for Don Giovanni, whose clothes he is still wearing. They surround Leporello and threaten to kill him. Donna Elvira tries to protect the man who she thinks is Don Giovanni, claiming him as her husband and begging the others to spare him. Leporello takes off Don Giovanni's cloak and reveals his true identity. He begs for mercy and, seeing an opportunity, runs off (Leporello aria: "Ah pietà signori miei" – "Ah, have mercy, my lords"). Don Ottavio is now convinced that Don Giovanni murdered Donna Anna's father (the deceased Commendatore). He swears vengeance ("Il mio tesoro" – "My treasure" – though in the Vienna version this was cut).

In the Vienna production of the opera, Zerlina follows Leporello and recaptures him. Threatening him with a razor, she ties him to a stool. He attempts to sweet-talk her out of hurting him. (Duet: "Per queste tue manine" – "For these hands of yours"). Zerlina goes to find Masetto and the others; Leporello escapes again before she returns. This scene, marked by low comedy, is rarely performed today. Also in the Vienna production, Donna Elvira is still furious at Don Giovanni for betraying her, but she also feels sorry for him. ("Mi tradì quell'alma ingrata" – "That ungrateful wretch betrayed me"). (Note: This scene was added at the same time as the preceding Zerlina / Leporello duet, but is generally retained and sung directly after "Il mio tesoro".)

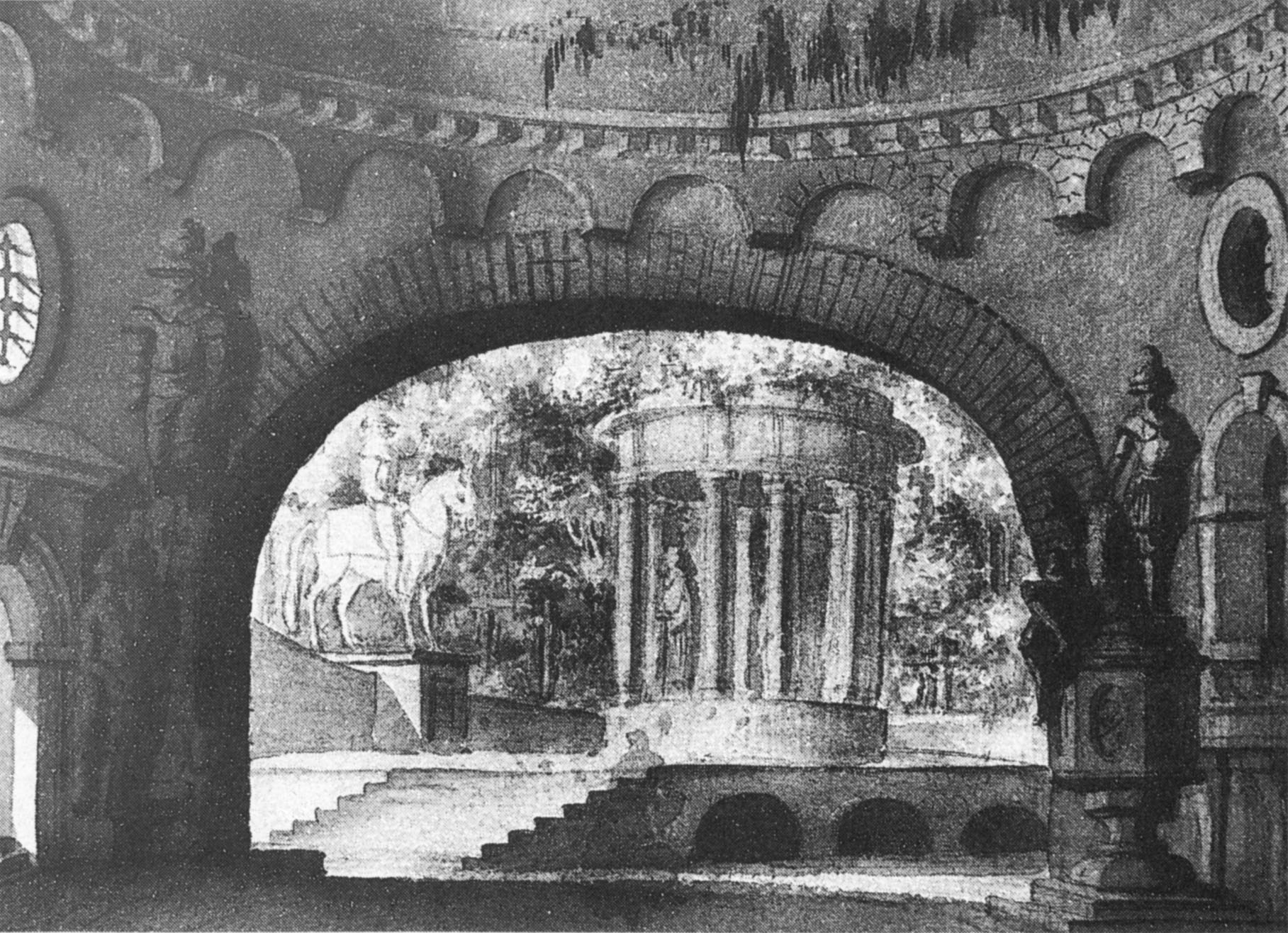
Graveyard scene of act 2 (Prague, probably 1790s), the earliest known set-design for the opera

A graveyard with the statue of the Commendatore

Don Giovanni wanders into a graveyard. Leporello arrives and the two reunite. Leporello tells Don Giovanni of his brush with danger, and Don Giovanni laughingly taunts him, saying that he took advantage of his disguise as Leporello by trying to seduce one of Leporello's girlfriends. The voice of the statue interrupts and warns Don Giovanni that his laughter will not last beyond sunrise. At the command of his master, Leporello reads the inscription upon the statue's base: "Here am I waiting for revenge against the scoundrel who killed me" ("Dell'empio che mi trasse al passo estremo qui attendo la vendetta"). The servant trembles, but Don Giovanni scornfully orders him to invite the statue to dinner, and threatens to kill him if he does not. Leporello makes several attempts to invite the statue to dinner, but is too frightened to complete the invitation (Duet: "O, statua gentilissima" – "Oh most noble statue"). Don Giovanni invites the statue to dinner himself. Much to his surprise, the statue nods its head and responds affirmatively.

Donna Anna's room

Don Ottavio pressures Donna Anna to marry him, but she thinks it is inappropriate so soon after her father's death. He accuses her of being cruel, and she assures him that she loves him, and is faithful ("Non mi dir" – "Tell me not").

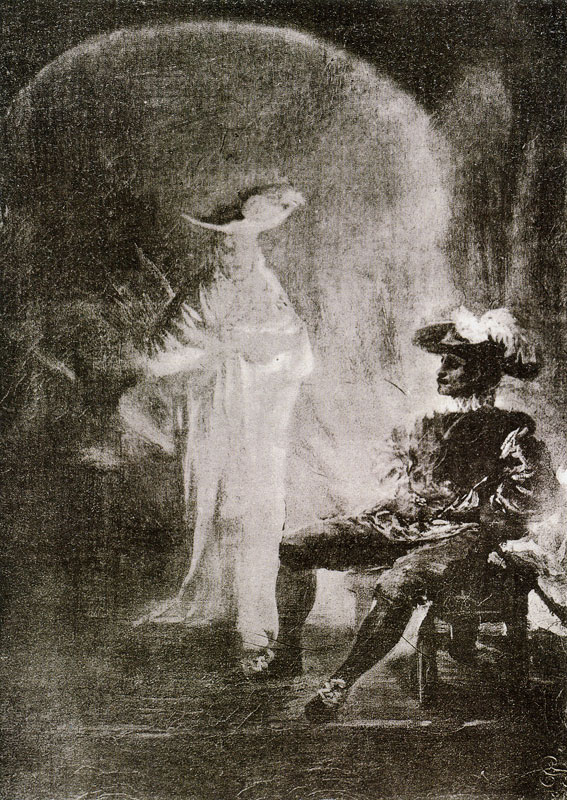
Don Juan and the Commander or The Stone Guest

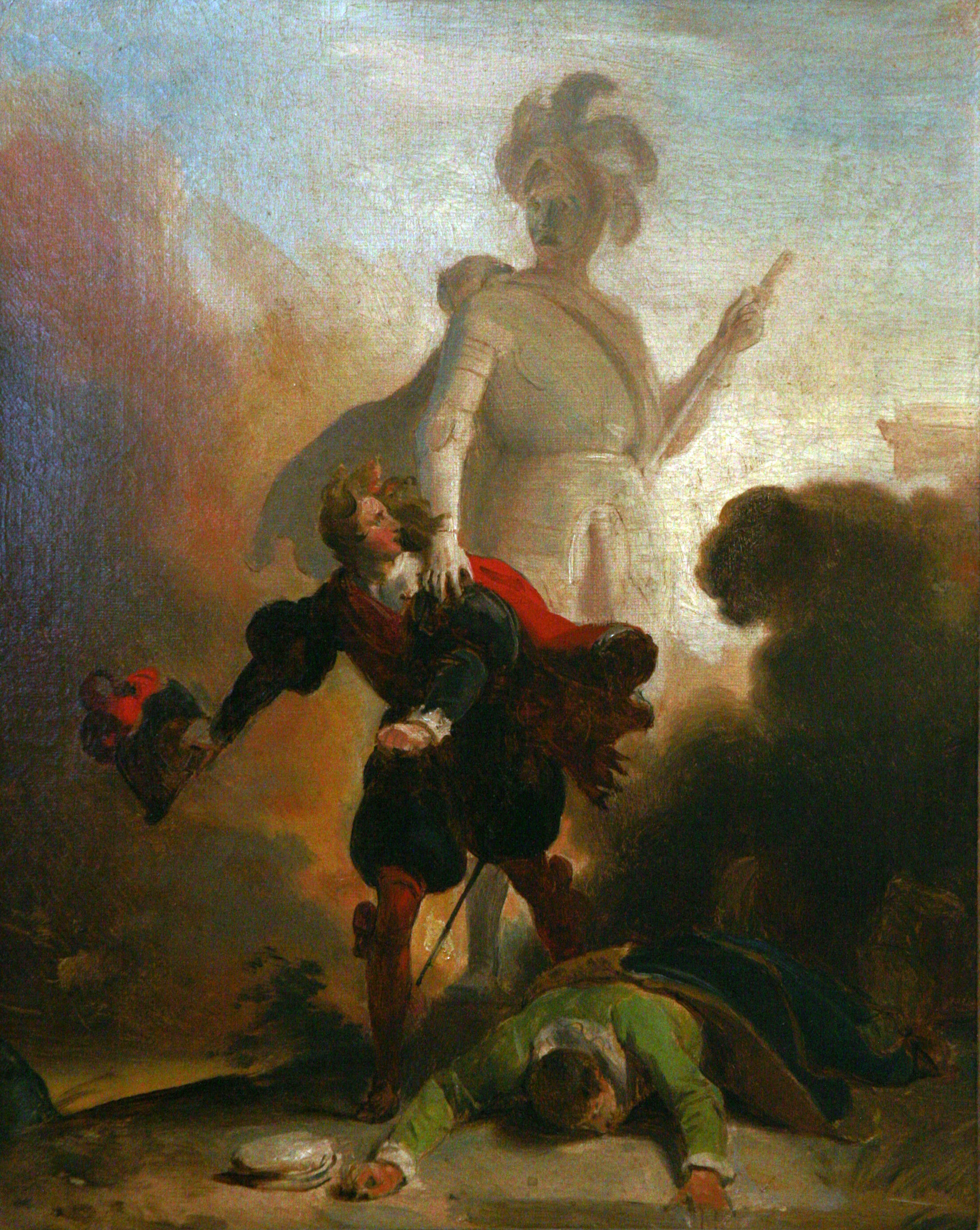
Don Giovanni confronting the stone guest; painting by Alexandre-Évariste Fragonard, c. 1830–35

Don Giovanni's chambers

"Don Giovanni, a cenar teco"
Kurt Böhme (Commendatore), Cesare Siepi (Don Giovanni), Fernando Corena (Leporello); Vienna Philharmonic, Josef Krips (1955)

Don Giovanni revels in the luxury of a great meal, served by Leporello, and musical entertainment during which the orchestra plays music from popular (at the time) late-18th-century operas: "O quanto un sì bel giubilo" from Vicente Martín y Soler's Una cosa rara (1786), "Come un agnello" from Giuseppe Sarti's Fra i due litiganti il terzo gode (1782), and finally "Non più andrai" from Mozart's own The Marriage of Figaro (1786). Leporello comments that he is all too familiar with the final tune (Questa poi la conosco purtroppo) – likely a joke understandable for the original audience, as Felice Ponziani, who sang Leporello's part at the premiere, also sang Figaro's part (including "Non più andrai") earlier in Prague. (Note: Freeman 2021, pp. 284–286, points out that the purpose of excerpting music from other composer's operas is an assertion of superiority – and a highly effective one. The impact of Mozart's music after hearing insipid examples by other composers' work is striking indeed. The dialogue that accompanies this vignette does not appear in the libretto published for the first performance, thus the idea was almost certainly Mozart's, and he must have written the lines of text himself.) (Finale "Già la mensa è preparata" – "Already the table is prepared"). Donna Elvira enters, saying that she no longer feels resentment against Don Giovanni, only pity for him. ("L'ultima prova dell'amor mio" – "The final proof of my love"). Don Giovanni, surprised, asks what she wants, and she begs him to change his life. Don Giovanni taunts her and then turns away, praising wine and women as the "support and glory of humankind" (sostegno e gloria d'umanità). Hurt and angry, Donna Elvira gives up and leaves. Offstage, she screams in sudden terror. Don Giovanni orders Leporello to see what has upset her; when he does, he also cries out, and runs back into the room, stammering that the statue has appeared as promised. An ominous knocking sounds at the door. Leporello, paralyzed by fear, cannot answer it, so Don Giovanni opens it himself, revealing the statue of the Commendatore. With the rhythmic chords of the overture, now reharmonized with diabolic diminished sevenths accompanying the Commendatore ("Don Giovanni! A cenar teco m'invitasti" – "Don Giovanni! You invited me to dine with you"), the statue asks if Don Giovanni will now accept his invitation to dinner. Don Giovanni brazenly accepts, and shakes the statue's proffered hand, only to collapse as he is overcome by sudden chills. The statue offers him a final chance to repent as death draws near, but Don Giovanni adamantly refuses. The statue disappears and Don Giovanni cries out in pain and terror as he is surrounded by a chorus of demons, who carry him down to Hell. Leporello, watching from under the table, also cries out in fear.

Donna Anna, Don Ottavio, Donna Elvira, Zerlina, and Masetto arrive, searching for the villain. They find instead Leporello hiding under the table, shaken by the supernatural horror he has witnessed. He assures them that no one will ever see Don Giovanni again. The remaining characters announce their plans for the future: Donna Anna and Don Ottavio will marry when Donna Anna's year of mourning is over; Donna Elvira will withdraw from society for the rest of her life; (Note: Freeman 2021, p. 287, points out that the correct translation of Donna Elvira's line Io men vado in un ritiro a finir la vita mia! indicates that she intends to remove herself to a "retreat" instead of entering a convent (as the line is frequently mistranslated into English). Neither in eighteenth-century Italian nor modern Italian could ritiro be construed as a synonym for convento (convent) or monastero (monastery). Rather, it has the connotation of a comfortable, secluded private dwelling in the countryside.) Zerlina and Masetto will finally go home for dinner; and Leporello will go to the tavern to find a better master.

The concluding ensemble delivers the moral of the opera – "Such is the end of the evildoer: the death of a sinner always reflects his life" (Questo è il fin di chi fa mal, e de' perfidi la morte alla vita è sempre ugual). As mentioned above, productions for over a century – beginning with the original run in Prague – customarily omitted the final ensemble, but it frequently reappeared in the 20th century and productions of the opera now usually include it. The return to D major and the innocent simplicity of the last few bars conclude the opera.

== Recordings ==
Paul Czinner directed a filming of the Salzburg Festival presentation in 1954.

A 1979 screen adaptation was directed by Joseph Losey with Ruggero Raimondi in the leading part.

== Cultural influence ==
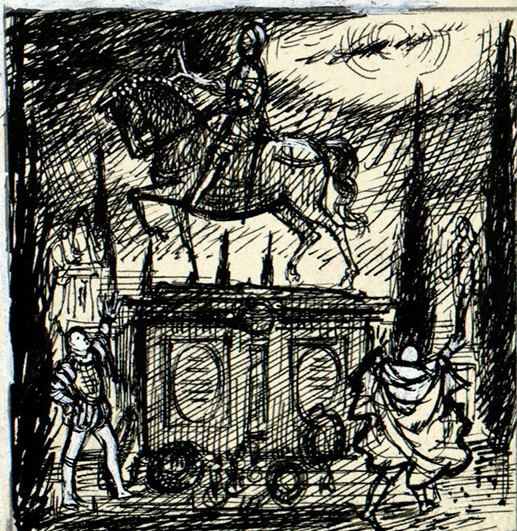
Drawing for the coverpage of a libretto (19th century)

The Danish philosopher Søren Kierkegaard wrote a long essay in his book Enten – Eller in which he argues, writing under the pseudonym of his character "A", that "among all classic works Don Giovanni stands highest." Charles Gounod wrote that Mozart's Don Giovanni is "a work without blemish, of uninterrupted perfection". The finale, in which Don Giovanni refuses to repent, has been a captivating philosophical and artistic topic for many writers including George Bernard Shaw, who in Man and Superman parodied the opera (with explicit mention of the Mozart score for the finale scene between the Commendatore and Don Giovanni). Gustave Flaubert called Don Giovanni, along with Hamlet and the sea, "the three finest things God ever made". E. T. A. Hoffmann also wrote a short story derived from the opera, "Don Juan", in which the narrator meets Donna Anna and describes Don Juan as an aesthetic hero rebelling against God and society.

In some Germanic and other languages, Leporello's "Catalogue Aria" provided the name "Leporello list" for pamphlets, as used for brochures, photo albums, computer printouts and other continuous stationery.

Playwright Peter Shaffer used Don Giovanni for a pivotal plot point in his play Amadeus, a fictional biography of its composer. In it, Antonio Salieri notices how Mozart composed the opera while tortured by the memory of his imposing, deceased father Leopold, and uses the information to psychologically torture Mozart even further.

=== Don Giovanni and other composers ===
The sustained popularity of Don Giovanni has resulted in extensive borrowings and arrangements of the original. The most famous and probably the most musically substantial is the operatic fantasy, Réminiscences de Don Juan by Franz Liszt. The minuet from the finale of act 1 ("Signor, guardate un poco"), transcribed by Moritz Moszkowski, also makes an incongruous appearance in the manuscript of Liszt's Fantasy on Themes from Mozart's Figaro and Don Giovanni, and Sigismond Thalberg uses the same minuet, along with "Deh, vieni alla finestra", in his Grand Fantaisie sur la serenade et le Minuet de Don Juan, Op. 42. Thalberg also included a piano arrangement of "Il mio tesoro" in his L'art du chant appliqué au piano", Op. 70. This minuet was also used for sets of variations for piano by Franz Xaver Wolfgang Mozart (Op. 2), Fanny Hünerwadel and János Fusz (Op. 10, the latter for four hands). "Deh, vieni alla finestra" also makes an appearance in the Klavierübung of Ferruccio Busoni, under the title Variations-Studie nach Mozart (Variation study after Mozart). Schumann included a piano arrangement of "Vedrai carino" in his Kleiner Lehrgang durch die Musikgeschichte, which was originally intended for his Album for the Young, whereas Muzio Clementi wrote piano variations on Zerlina's other aria, "Batti, batti". Johann Wilhelm Wilms took a theme from the duet "O, statua gentilissima" for his set of piano variations. Chopin wrote Variations on "Là ci darem la mano" (the duet between Don Giovanni and Zerlina) for piano and orchestra. Beethoven and Danzi also wrote variations on the same theme. And Beethoven, in his Diabelli Variations, cites the beginning of the opera "Notte e giorno faticar" in variation 22. Cipriani Potter wrote piano variations on "Fin ch'han dal vino", Op. 2 (1816). The turkeys in Chabrier's "Ballade des gros dindons" (1889) finish each verse imitating the mandolin accompaniment of the Serenade.

Pyotr Ilyich Tchaikovsky always regarded Don Giovanni – and its composer – with awe. In 1855, Mozart's original manuscript had been purchased in London by the mezzo-soprano Pauline Viardot, who was the teacher of Tchaikovsky's one-time unofficial fiancée Désirée Artôt (whom Viardot may have persuaded not to go through with her plan to marry the composer). Viardot kept the manuscript in a shrine in her Paris home, where it was visited by many people. Tchaikovsky visited her when he was in Paris in June 1886, and said that when looking at the manuscript, he was "in the presence of divinity". So it is not surprising that the centenary of the opera in 1887 would inspire him to write something honouring Mozart. Instead of taking any themes from Don Giovanni, however, he took four lesser known works by Mozart and arranged them into his fourth orchestral suite, which he called Mozartiana. The baritone who sang the title role in the centenary performance of Don Giovanni in Prague that year was Mariano Padilla y Ramos, the man Désirée Artôt married instead of Tchaikovsky.

Michael Nyman's popular, short band piece In Re Don Giovanni (1981, with later adaptations and revisions) is constructed on a prominent 15-bar phrase in the accompaniment to Leporello's catalogue aria.

In addition to instrumental works, allusions to Don Giovanni also appear in a number of operas: Nicklausse of Offenbach's The Tales of Hoffmann sings a snatch of Leporello's "Notte e giorno", and Rossini quotes from the same aria in the duettino between Selim and Fiorilla following the former's cavatina in act 1 of Il turco in Italia. (Note: Leporello's F major e non voglio più servir becomes Fiorilla's A major così pien di civiltà, the music being quoted verbatim.)

Ramón Carnicer's opera Don Giovanni Tenorio (1822) is a peculiar reworking of Mozart's opera to adapt it to Rossinian fashion. It comprises new music by Carnicer on a new text (e.g. the first half of act 1), new music on Da Ponte's text (e.g. Leporello's aria) or on a mixture of both (e.g. the new trio for the scene in the cemetery); the whole collated with extensive quotations or entire sections borrowed directly from Mozart (e.g. Finale 1 and Finale 2, and even some music from Le nozze di Figaro (Note: But not in the dinner scene; here Carnicer borrows some different tunes from Una cosa rara and Litiganti and presumably some music of his own as third quotation)), though usually slightly reworked and re-orchestrated.

== Notes and references ==
Notes

Sources

- Abert, Hermann (2007). Cliff Eisen (ed.). W. A. Mozart. Translated by Stewart Spencer. Yale University Press. ISBN 978-0300072235.
- Casaglia, Gherardo (2005)."Don Giovanni, 29 October 1787". L'Almanacco di Gherardo Casaglia (in Italian).
- Deutsch, Otto Erich (1965). Mozart: A Documentary Biography. Stanford University Press. ISBN 978-0-8047-0233-1.
- Freeman, Daniel E. (2021). Mozart in Prague. Edina, Minnesota: Calumet Editions. ISBN 9781950743506.
- Gounod, Charles (1970). Mozart's Don Giovanni: A Commentary (from the third French edition of Le Don Juan de Mozart, London, R. Cocks, 1895). Translated by Windeyer Clark; J. P. Hutchinson. New York: Da Capo Press.
- Kierkegaard, Søren (1992). Victor Eremita (ed.). Either/Or (abridged, translated, and with an introduction and notes, by Alastair Hannay). London: Penguin.
- Schneider, Magnus Tessing (2021). The Original Portrayal of Mozart's Don Giovanni. Routledge. doi:10.4324/9780429281709. ISBN 978-0-429-28170-9.
