= Zoilos (disambiguation) =

Zoilos I (reigned c. 130 BCE – 120 BCE), Indo-Greek king, known as "The Just", who ruled in Northern India.

Zoilos or Zoilus may also refer to:

- Zoilos II (reigned c. 55 BCE – 35 BCE), Indo-Greek king, known as "Soter" ("Saviour"), who ruled in eastern Punjab; his predecessor was Dionysios and his successor was Apollophanes
- Zoilus of Amphipolis (c. 400 BCE – 320 BCE), Greek grammarian, Cynic philosopher and literary critic from East Macedonia (Thrace); remembered as detractor of Homer; his own writings have not survived
