= Giuseppe Nicolini (composer) =

Italian composer

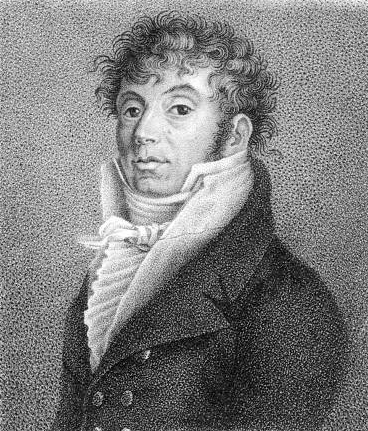
Giuseppe Nicolini on a stipple engraving by Luigi Rados (1773–1840)

Giuseppe Nicolini (or Niccolini; 29 January 1762 – 18 December 1842) was an Italian composer who wrote at least 45 operas. From 1819 onwards, he devoted himself primarily to religious music. He was born and died in Piacenza. The music conservatory of Piacenza is named after him.

== Operas ==
Nicolini's operas include:

- La famiglia stravagante (dramma giocoso, 1793, Parma)
- La clemenza di Tito (opera seria, libretto by Pietro Metastasio, 1797, Livorno)
- I due fratelli ridicoli (Li fratelli ridicoli) (dramma giocoso, libretto by Filippo Livigni, 1798, Rome)
- Il trionfo del bel sesso (dramma giocoso, libretto by Giovanni Bertati, 1799)
- I baccanali di Roma (1801, Milan)
- Il geloso innamorato (farsa, libretto by Giambattista Lorenzi, 1804, Naples)
- Traiano in Dacia (opera seria, libretto by Michelangelo Prunetti, 1807, Rome)
- Le due gemelle (farsa, 1808, Rome)
- Coriolano ossia L'assedio di Roma (opera seria, libretto by Luigi Romanelli, 1808, Milan)
- Angelica e Medoro ossia L'Orlando (opera seria, libretto by Gaetano Sertor from Pietro Metastasio, 1810, Turin)
- Abradate e Dircea (opera seria, libretto by Luigi Romanelli, 1811, Milan)
- Quinto Fabio (Quinto Fabio Rutililiano) (opera seria, libretto by Giuseppe Rossi, 1811, Vienna)
- La casa dell'astrologo (dramma giocoso, libretto by Luigi Romanelli, 1811, Milan)
- Le nozze dei Morlacchi (I Morlacchi) (opera seria, 1811, Vienna)
- La feudataria ossia Il podestà ridicolo (dramma giocoso, 1812, Piacenza)
- Carlo Magno (opera seria, libretto by Antonio Peracchi, 1813, Piacenza)
- L'eroe di Lancastro (opera seria, libretto by Giuseppe Rossi, 1821, Turin)
- Aspasia e Agide (opera seria, libretto by Luigi Romanelli, 1824, Milan)

== Bibliography ==
- "Niccolini (Joseph)", in François-Joseph Fétis, Biographie universelle des musiciens et bibliographie générale de la musique, vol. 6, Paris, Firmin-Didot, 1866–1868, pp. 310–311
- Andrea Lanza: "Nicolini, Giuseppe", The New Grove Dictionary of Music and Musicians, 2001
- G. Nicolini: "Gratias agimus Tibi", dal "Gloria" della Missa Brevis in Re for 3 voices and orchestra, edition by Mario G. Genesi, Piacenza, P. M. Edizione, 2008, pp. 10.
- Mario Genesi, "La cantata italiana mitologico-occasionale da palazzo e l'oratorio biblico per soli, coro ed orchestra (1800–1830) nelle frequentazioni di due compositori piacentini: l'operista Giuseppe Nicolini e il conte Daniele Nicelli" in Archivio Storico per le Province Parmensi, Parma, Tip. Riunite Donati, vol. 64, 2013, pp. 323–383.
- Mario Genesi, "Nicolini Vs.Mozart: La Cantata Il Sogno di Scipione su versi dell'abate Pietro Trapassi detto Metastasio"in Archivio Storico per le Province Parmensi, Parma, Tip. Riunite Donati
- G. Nicolini, Violin concert in D major, modern edition by Luca Brignole, premiere: Piacenza, 21 December 2014
