= Otto Biba =

Austrian musicologist

Otto Biba (born 9 August 1946) is an Austrian musicologist and archive director of the Gesellschaft der Musikfreunde in Vienna.

== Career ==
Born in Vienna, after studying history and musicology (doctorate University of Vienna in 1974), Biba has been working in the field of musicology since 1973 in the Gesellschaft der Musikfreunde archive, library and collections. In 1979, he succeeded Hedwig Mitringer as its director. Since then, he has been active as a scholarly author, editor of musical works, exhibition curator and lecturer in Vienna and internationally. As a researcher, he was particularly concerned with Joseph Haydn, Franz Schubert and Johannes Brahms, but also with the Piarists order and with Gottfried von Einem. Biba has published over 120 editions of compositions.
