= Antonio Tozzi =

Italian opera composer

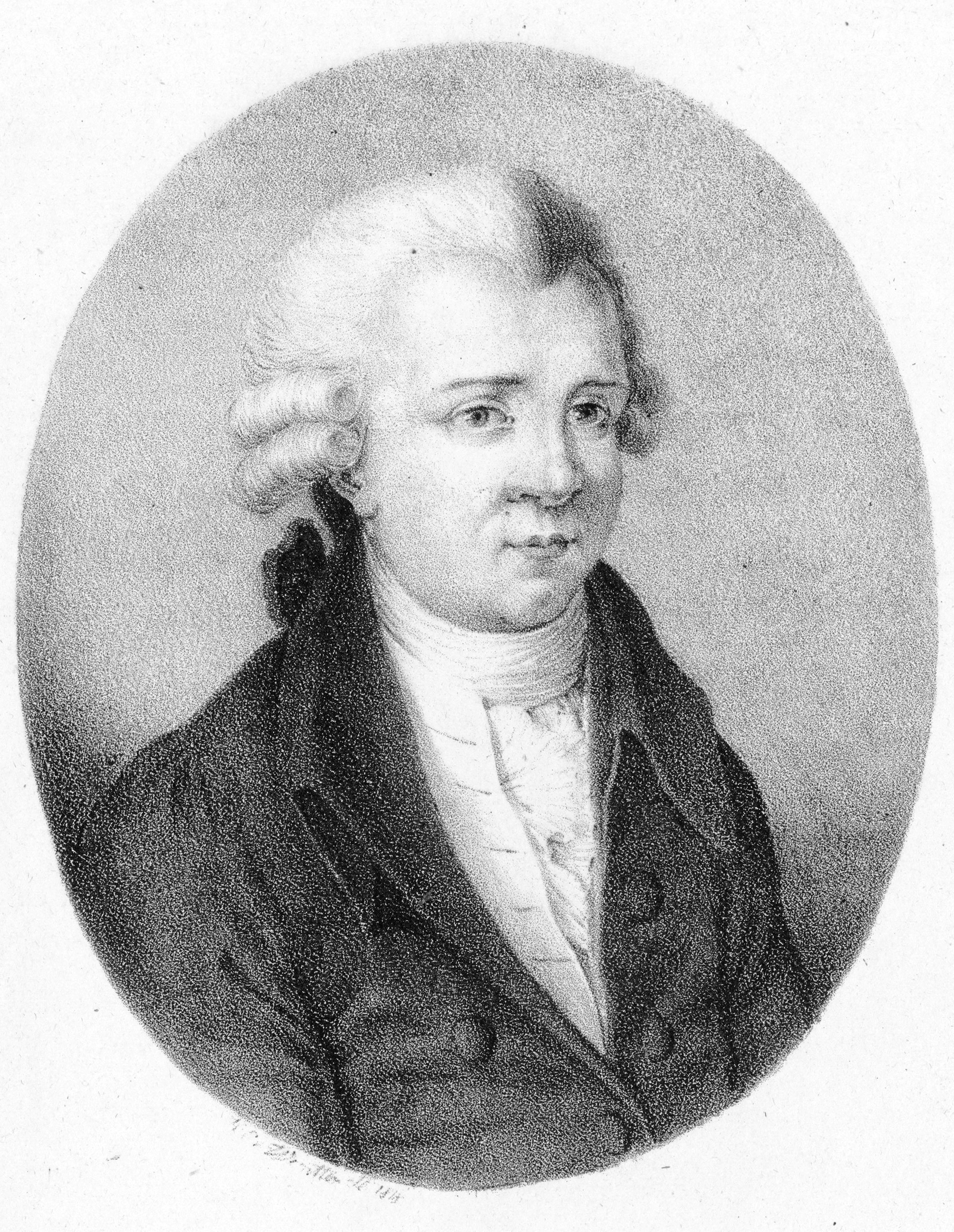
Antonio Tozzi

Antonio Tozzi (c. 1736 - after 1812) was an Italian opera composer.

He was born at Bologna, Italy. He studied with Padre Martini and became a member of the Accademia Filarmonica di Bologna in 1761. His first opera Tigrane, was performed in Venice in 1762. His La morte di Dimone of 1763 was an early opera semiseria. In 1764 he was asked to work for the court in Brunswick. In 1774 he became Hofkapellmeister in Munich and his Orfeo ed Euridice was performed there in 1775. Shortly afterwards however a scandal involving the Countess von Törring-Seefeld caused him to flee the city and he returned to Venice. The following year he was in Spain, working in Madrid and later Barcelona where he did a substantial part of his work, finally leaving Spain for Italy in 1805. He died at Bologna.

== Sources ==
- Stevenson, Robert and McClymonds, Marita P (1992), 'Erismena' in The New Grove Dictionary of Opera, ed. Stanley Sadie (London) ISBN 0-333-73432-7
