= Giacomo Tritto =

Italian composer (1733–1824)

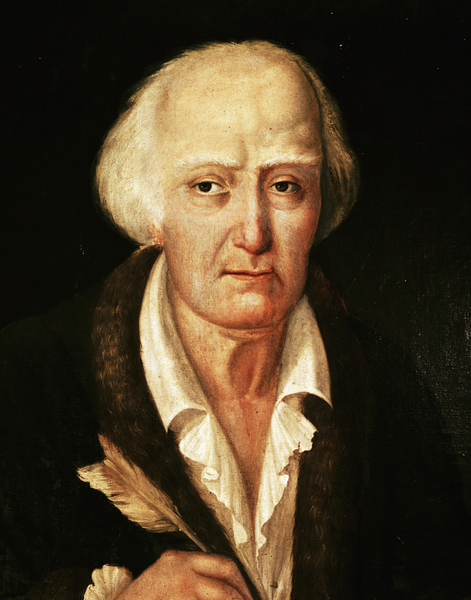
- Born: Giacomo Domenico Mario Antonio Pasquale Giuseppe Di Tritto; 2 April 1733; Altamura, Kingdom of Naples
- Died: 16 September 1824 (aged 91); Naples, Kingdom of the Two Sicilies
- Education: Conservatorio della Pietà dei Turchini
- Occupation: Composer
- Era: Classical
- Known for: Composing 54 operas
- Notable work: Le nozze contrastate, Fedeltà in amore

Giacomo Domenico Mario Antonio Pasquale Giuseppe Di Tritto (2 April 1733 – 16 September 1824) was an Italian composer, known primarily for his fifty-four operas. He was born in Altamura, and studied in Naples; among his teachers were Nicola Fago, Girolamo Abos, and Pasquale Cafaro. Amongst his pupils were the young Vincenzo Bellini around 1821, plus Ferdinando Orlandi. He died in Naples.

== Biography ==
Giacomo Tritto was born in Altamura. He began studying music at the Conservatorio della Pietà dei Turchini in Naples, where his teachers included Nicola Fago, Girolamo Abos, and Pasquale Cafaro.

Also in Naples, in 1754, he began his career as an opera composer with the performance of the opera buffa Le nozze contrastate at the Teatro dei Fiorentini. However, advised by his teacher Cafaro not to continue his just-begun theatrical career, he left the stage for about ten years. He resumed opera composition in 1764 with the staging of Fedeltà in amore at the Teatro Nuovo (Naples). From that point on, until 1810, he composed no fewer than 54 operas.

== Operas ==
- Le nozze contrastate (opera buffa, 1754, Naples)
- La fedeltà in amore (opera buffa, libretto by Francesco Cerlone, 1764, Naples)
- Li furbi (intermezzo, 1765, Naples)
- Il principe riconosciuto (opera buffa, libretto by Francesco Cerlone, 1780, Naples)
- La francese di spirito o La viaggiatrice di spirito (opera buffa, libretto by G. M. Mililotti, 1781, Rome)
- La Bellinda o L'ortolana fedele (opera buffa, libretto by Francesco Cerlone, 1781, Naples)
- Don Procopio in corte del Pretejanni (opera buffa, 1782, Naples)
- Don Papirio (opera buffa, libretto by Giuseppe Palomba, 1782, Naples)
- I due gemelli (opera buffa, libretto by Giovanni Battista Lorenzi, 1783, Naples)
- Il convitato di pietra (opera semiseria, libretto by Giovanni Battista Lorenzi, 1783, Naples)
- La sposa stramba (opera buffa, 1783, Naples)
- La scuola degli amanti (opera buffa, libretto by Giuseppe Palomba, 1783, Naples)
- La scuffiara (opera buffa, libretto by Giovanni Battista Lorenzi, 1784, Naples)
- Il matrimonio negli Elisii ovvero La sposa bizzarra (opera buffa, libretto by Carlo Giuseppe Lanfranchi-Rossi, 1784, Rome)
- L'Artenice (opera seria, 1784, Naples)
- L'Arminio (opera seria, libretto by Ferdinando Moretti, 1786, Rome)
- Le gelosie ovvero I due fratelli burlati (farsetta, 1786, Rome)
- Li raggiri scoperti (opera buffa, 1786, Rome)
- La vergine del sole (opera seria, libretto by Carlo Giuseppe Lanfranchi-Rossi, 1786, Naples)
- Armida (opera seria, 1786, Naples)
- Le vicende amorose (dramma giocoso, libretto by Pastor Arcade Timido, 1787, Rome)
- La molinara spiritosa (opera buffa, libretto by Francesco Saverio Zini, 1787, Naples)
- La bella selvaggia (opera semiseria, 1788, Rome)
- La scaltra avventuriera (opera buffa, libretto by Giuseppe Palomba, 1788, Naples)
- Il giuocatore fortunato (opera buffa, libretto by Giuseppe Petrosellini, 1788, Naples)
- Il finti padroni (farsa, 1789, Rome)
- La prova reciproca (L'inganno fortunato ossia La prova reciproca) (opera buffa, libretto by Giuseppe Palomba, 1789, Naples)
- I servi padroni (farsetta, 1790, Rome)
- La cantarina (opera buffa, libretto by Carlo Goldoni, 1790, Rome)
- Il cartesiano fantastico (opera buffa, libretto by Giuseppe Maria Diodati, 1790, Naples)
- Le astuzie in amore (opera buffa, libretto by Giuseppe Maria Diodati, 1790, Naples)
- L'inganno amoroso (opera buffa, 1790, Madrid)
- L'equivoco (opera buffa, libretto by C. Fiori, 1791, Naples)
- La creduta selvaggia (farsetta, 1792, Rome)
- Gli amici rivali (opera buffa, 1792, Vienna)
- Le trame spiritose (commedia, libretto by Giuseppe Palomba, 1792, Naples)
- La fedeltà nelle selve (La fedeltà tra le selve) (opera buffa, libretto by Michelangelo Prunetti, 1793, Venice)
- Le nozze in garbuglio (opera semiseria, libretto by Giuseppe Maria Diodati, 1793, Naples)
- L'ordine del disordine (opera buffa, 1793, Naples)
- L'impostore smascherato (opera buffa, libretto by Giuseppe Maria Diodati, 1794, Naples)
- Gli amanti in puntiglio (opera buffa, libretto by Giuseppe Maria Diodati, 1794, Naples)
- Apelle e Campaspe (opera seria, libretto by Simeone Antonio Sografi, 1795, Milan)
- Il barone in angustie (opera buffa, libretto by Giuseppe Palomba, 1797, Naples)
- La donna sensibile o sia Gli amanti riuniti (opera buffa, libretto by Domenico Piccinni, 1798, Naples)
- La morte di Cesare (opera seria, libretto by Gaetano Sertor, 1798, Brescia)
- Micaboro in Jucatan (opera seria, libretto by Domenico Piccinni, 1799, Naples)
- I matrimoni in contrasto (opera semiseria, libretto by Giuseppe Ceccherini, 1800, Rome)
- Ginevra e Ariodante (opera seria, libretto by Domenico Piccinni, 1801, Naples)
- Gli americani (Gonzalvo ossia Gli americani) (opera seria, libretto by Giovanni Schmidt, 1802, Naples)
- Cesare in Egitto (opera seria, libretto by Giovanni Schmidt, 1805, Rome)
- Lo specchio dei gelosi (opera buffa, 1805, Rome)
- Elpinice e Vologeso (opera seria, libretto by Domenico Piccinni, 1806, Rome)
- Andromaca e Pirro (opera seria, 1807, Rome)
- Marco Albino in Siria (opera seria, 1810, Naples)
