= Giacomo Rust =

Italian composer

Giacomo Rust or Rusti (1741 in Rome, Italy – 1786 in Barcelona, Spain) was an Italian opera composer, probably of German ancestry.

Not a great deal is known about Rust. Between 1763 and 1777, Rust was active in Venice, where his first opera, a dramma giocoso, La contadina in corte, to a libretto by Niccolò Tassi, was performed in 1763. During this period, Rust acquired great fame as opera composer, not only in Italy, but also abroad, which gained him an invitation to be employed in the service of the Archbishop of Salzburg. On 12 June 1777, he was named a choir master at the Salzburg court, a post that he abandoned towards the end of the year. Some time later, Rust returned to Venice to continue his operatic activity. In 1783, he settled down in Barcelona, where he assumed the office of the Maestro de capilla.

== Works ==
The following is the list of the operas composed by Rust.

Title	Genre	Subdivisions	Libretto	Première date	Place, theatre
La contadina in corte	dramma giocoso per musica	3 acts	Niccolò Tassi	1763	Venice, Teatro San Moisè
La finta semplice	dramma giocoso	3 acts	Pasquale Mililotti	spring 1772	Bologna, Formagliari
L'idolo cinese	dramma giocoso	3 acts	Giovanni Battista Lorenzi	28 December 1773	Venice, Teatro San Samuele
Il conte Baccellone	dramma giocoso	3 acts	Marco Coltellini, from La contessina by Carlo Goldoni	autumn 1774	Venice, Teatro San Moisè
I cavalieri lunatici	farsa	3 acts		autumn 1774	Venice, San Cassiano
L'amor bizzaro	dramma giocoso	3 acts	Giovanni Bertati	carnival 1775	Venice, Teatro San Moisè
Li due amanti in inganno (Acts 1 & 3, act 2 by Matteo Rauzzini)	dramma giocoso	3 acts		carnival 1775	Venice, San Cassiano
Alessandro nelle Indie	dramma per musica	3 acts	Metastasio	Ascension 1775	Venice, Teatro San Samuele
Il baron in terra asciuta	dramma giocoso	8 scenes		26 December 1775	Venice, Teatro San Samuele
Il Socrate immaginario	dramma giocoso	15 scenes	Giovanni Battista Lorenzi	carnival 1776	Venice, Teatro San Samuele
Calliroe	dramma per musica	3 acts	Mattia Verazi	June 1776	Padua, Nuovo
Il Giove di Creta	dramma giocoso	3 acts		autumn 1776	Venice, San Cassiano
Li due protetti	dramma giocoso	2 acts	Pier Antonio Bagliacca	26 December 1776	Venice, Teatro San Moisè
Il Parnaso confuso	festa teatrale	1 act	Metastasio	17 May 1778	Salzburg, Hof
Vologeso, re de' Parti	dramma per musica	2 acts	A Zeno	28 December 1778	Venice, Teatro San Benedetto
Il talismano (Act 2, Act 3) (Act 1 by Antonio Salieri)	dramma giocoso	3 acts	Carlo Goldoni	21 August 1779	Milan
L'isola capricciosa	dramma giocoso	2 acts	Caterino Mazzolà	carnival 1780	Venice, Teatro San Samuele
Gli antiquari in Palmira	commedia per musica	3 acts	Giuseppe Carpani	autumn 1780	Milan, Teatro alla Scala
Demofoonte	dramma per musica	3 acts	Metastasio	autumn 1780	Florence, Pergola
Il castellano deluso				carnival 1781	Parma, Ducale
Artaserse	dramma per musica	3 acts	Metastasio	autumn 1781	Perugia, Civico
Adriano in Siria	dramma per musica	3 acts	Metastasio	26 December 1781	Turin, Teatro Regio
L'incognita fortunata	farsa	1 act	G. Ciliberti	summer 1782	Naples, Fondo
L'incontri inaspettati				February 1783	Rome, Capranica
La caccia d'Enrico IV	dramma giocoso	2 acts	A. Dian	autumn 1783	Venice, Teatro San Moisè
Il marito indolente	dramma giocoso	2 acts	Caterino Mazzolà	1784	Vienna, Hoftheater
Berenice	dramma per musica	3 acts	Jacopo Durandi	carnival 1786	Parma
