= Catalogue aria =

Opera aria in which the singer recounts a list of information

A catalogue aria is a genre of opera aria in which the singer recounts a list of information (people, places, food, dance steps, etc.). This style was popular in Italian comic opera in the latter half of the eighteenth and early nineteenth centuries.

The traditional devices of the catalogue aria include a solidly neutral opening, a section of rising comic excitement full of rapid patter and an emphatic final cadence, normally closing with an epigram. Common features include asyndeton, anaphora, rhyme schemes, and complete phrases stacked two to a line, typically expressed with joy, anger, excitement or fear, routinely fast declamation of patter in a generally mechanical and often impersonal way.

== History ==
"Madamina, il catalogo è questo" from Wolfgang Amadeus Mozart's Don Giovanni is the most famous example, and is often referred to as "the catalogue aria". Leporello notes how many lovers the title character has had in each country he has visited. Pasquale sings two such arias in Joseph Haydn's Orlando paladino, "Ho viaggiato in Francia, in Spagna" in act 1, which lists the countries to which he has traveled, and "Ecco spiano" in act 2, which rattles off all of his varied musical talents.

The clearest antecedent of the catalogue aria of Mozart and librettist Lorenzo Da Ponte can be found in the 1787 opera, Don Giovanni Tenorio, with which they were both familiar, composed by Giuseppe Gazzaniga on a libretto by Giovanni Bertati. Da Ponte based much of his libretto on Bertati's, heavily revised for content and language but significantly retaining much of the narrative structure. In this opera, one finds a similar catalogue aria for the equivalent character of Leporello, Pasquariello. John Platoff sees superiority in Da Ponte's text as well as Mozart's music. The Bertati aria, "Dell' Italia ed Alemagna" uses punch lines such as "ve ne sono non se quante" (there I know not how many) while Da Ponte uses specific numerical figures to add to the humor (e.g. "ma in Espagna, son già mille e tre" (But in Spain he had one thousand and three). Bertati also structures the aria differently, beginning immediately with the list and not including an introduction, which is in the preceding recitative. Da Ponte removed ugly words and references to women of lower social station ("cuoche", "guattere"), and took a reference that being female is enough to be of interest to Giovanni (although Bertati's Giovanni, unlike Da Ponte's, is not interested in old ladies), to a more subtle conclusion shifted to the closing that it Giovanni wants anyone who wears a skirt. Platoff considers Mozart's approach to the music "genius" in that Mozart finishes the patter in the first part of the aria before going on to the second. His unconventional approach divides the aria "based on content rather than metre". By dividing the aria at line 14, Mozart separates the numbers of women from the kinds of women, "contrary to the natural tendency to put the energetic high point at the end of the comic aria", although Platoff also notes that Giovanni Paisiello does this in "Scorsi già molti paesi", a buffa aria from Il barbiere di Siviglia (libretto by Giuseppe Petrosellini) to which Platoff compares catalogue arias in general. The minuet for of the andante section allows Leporello to imitate his master. This, Platoff argues, "draws comedy from human foible rather than mechanized display of patter declamation", suggesting that Leporello is telling us as much about himself as he is about Giovanni. Leporello's aria contains no epigram—the Andante section takes its place.

Headington, Westbrook, and Barfoot in Opera: A History (1987) say that "Ho viaggiato in Francia, in Spagna" "must surely be ranked as the forerunner of Leporello's... aria", but they seem to have gone to the next most familiar piece of music rather than digging into research. Platoff notes that catalogue arias were a particular specialty of Bertati.

== Examples ==
(in chronological order)

- "A Lion la Contessa la Cra", Il viaggiatore ridicolo (1757) by Carlo Goldoni and set by multiple composers
- "Voi sapete aliogiato nelle stanze medesime", L'isola de Alcina (1772) by Giuseppe Gazzaniga and Giovanni Bertati
- "Quano vedrai chi sono" (Comte Zeffiro), La vendemmia (1778) by Giuseppe Gazzaniga and Giovanni Bertati
- "Contesse, baronesse" (Monsieur de Crotignac), Il pittore parigina (1781) by Domenico Cimarosa and Giuseppe Petrosellini
- "Ho viaggiato in Francia, in Spagna" (Pasquale), Orlando paladino (1782) by Joseph Haydn and Nunziato Porta
- "Ecco spiano" (Pasquale), Orlando paladino (1782) by Joseph Haydn and Nunziato Porta
- "I capricci del cervello", Il ricco d'un giorno (1784) by Antonio Salieri and Lorenzo Da Ponte
- "Che sei und grand asino" (Lena), Il mercato de Malmantile (1784) by Josef Bárta and Giacomo Francesco Bussani
- "Aprite un po' quegli occhi" (Figaro), Le nozze di Figaro (1786) by Wolfgang Amadeus Mozart and Lorenzo Da Ponte
- "Dell' Italia ed Alemagna" (Pasquariello), Don Giovanni Tenorio (1787) by Giuseppe Gazzaniga and Giovanni Bertati
- "Madamina, il catalogo è questo" (Leporello), Don Giovanni (1787) by Wolfgang Amadeus Mozart and Lorenzo Da Ponte
- "Rivolgete a lui lo sguardo" (Guglielmo), intended for Così fan tutte (1789) by Wolfgang Amadeus Mozart and Lorenzo Da Ponte, though not included in the performed version
- "Venti mila gigliati ai Tunisini" (Messer), Il re Teodoro in Venezia (1789) by Giovanni Paisiello and Giovanni Battista Casti

== See also ==
- Patter song
- List song
