= Gaetano Rossi =

Italian opera librettist (1774–1855)

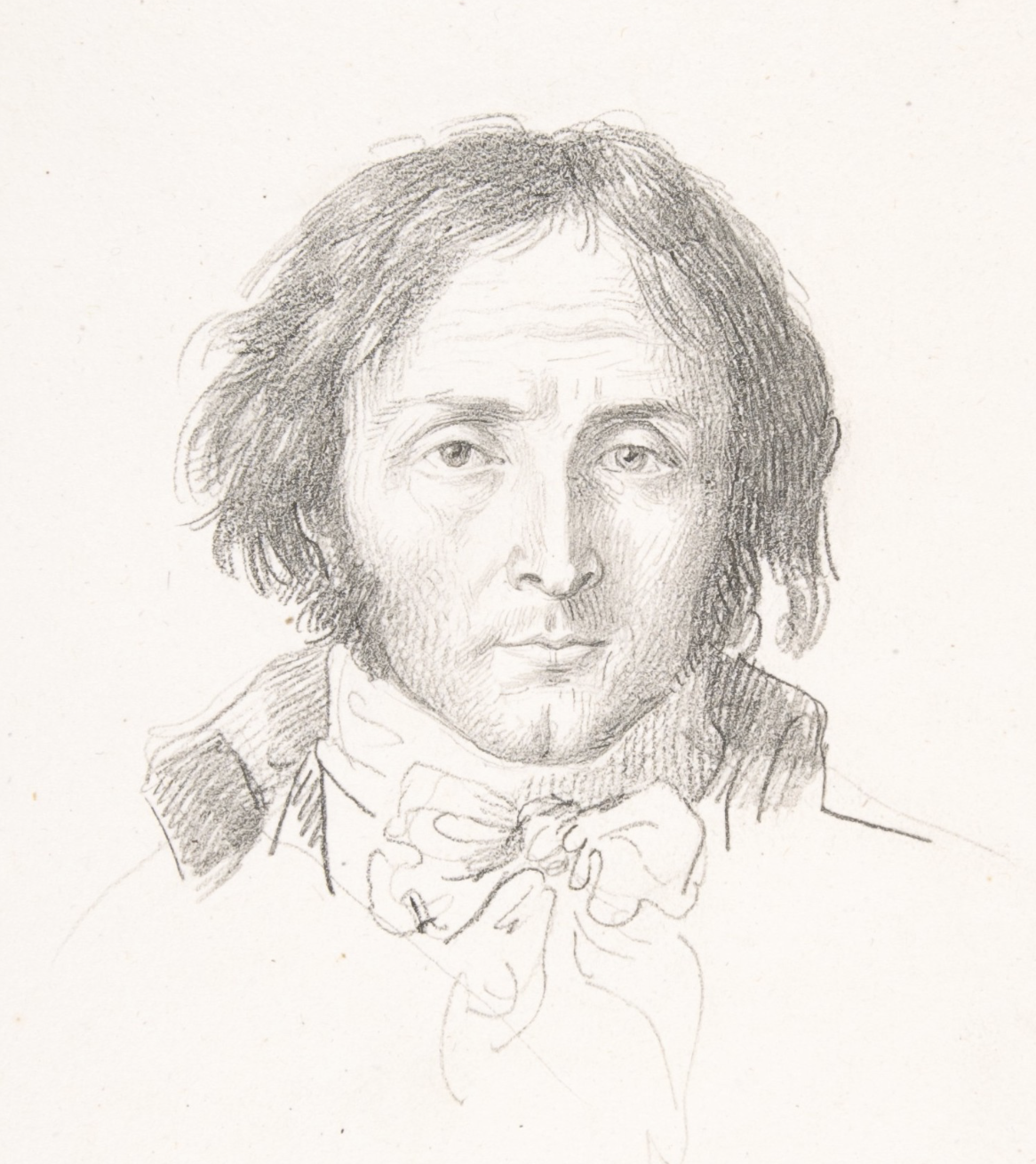
Gaetano Rossi

Gaetano Rossi (Italian: [ɡaeˈtaːno ˈrossi]; 18 May 1774 – 25 January 1855) was an Italian opera librettist for several of the well-known bel canto-era composers including Gioachino Rossini, Gaetano Donizetti, and Saverio Mercadante in Italy and Giacomo Meyerbeer in one of his early Italian successes. Other composers with whom he worked included Simon Mayr, a composer and Donizetti's teacher, as well as the prolific Giovanni Pacini.

== Biography ==
Born in Verona, Rossi was writing religious verse by the time he was 13 years old. He wrote libretti for about 60 years, beginning in 1797 with mostly farsas. Rossi wrote the texts for some significant operas by the well-known composers of the era. These included Tancredi and Semiramide for Rossini and Il crociato in Egitto for Meyerbeer, as well as later operas for Donizetti such as Maria Padilla (as co-author) and Linda di Chamounix. In addition to his writing, he also worked for a time as the stage director for the Teatro Filarmonico in Verona. Musicologist John Black regards him as producing crude versification, "but nevertheless he had an eye for dramatic situations and his texts, if long-winded, were effective." His success was twofold: in finding mostly foreign sources to utilize, as well as introducing "strongly romantic plots to the Italian stage".

== Works ==
Legend: Autumn = Autumn season (Autunno); Carnival = Carnival season (i. e. from 26 December to Easter); Spring = Spring season (Primavera)

Date first performed	Title of opera	Composer(s)	Location of premiere	Genre or subtitle
Autumn 1797	Alzira (after Voltaire; authorship unsure)	Giuseppe Nicolini	Florence, Teatro della Pergola	dramma per musica
26 December 1797	Carolina e Mexicow	Niccolò Antonio Zingarelli	Venice, La Fenice	tragedia per musica
18 October 1798	Che originali! (also given as: La musicomania ossia Il pazzo per la musica, Vienna, 9 May 1803, Il fanatico per la musica, Venice 1815, and Oh! Che originali, Milan 1829)	Johann Simon Mayr; Adolfo Bassi (with Mayr and Ruggero Manna) as Il musicomaniaco (Trieste, Teatro della Società filarmonico-drammatica, 1830); Francesco Schira (1835)	Venice, Teatro San Benedetto	farsa per musica
8 December 1798	Amore e paura (also as: Amore e paura ossia il conte Pimpinella, Padua, Autumn 1802)	Vittorio Trento	Venice, Teatro San Benedetto	farsa di un atto per musica
January 1799	Gli sciti (after Voltaire's Les Scythes)	Giuseppe Nicolini; Johann Simon Mayr (Venice, La Fenice, 21 February 1800)	Milan, Teatro alla Scala	dramma per musica
Carnival 1799	Le quattro mogli (also as: Il concorso delle spose ossia il letterato alla moda, Milan, Teatro Carcano, Spring 1806)	Gaetano Marinelli	Venice, Teatro San Benedetto	dramma giocoso per musica
1 May 1799	Adelaide di Guesclino (after Voltaire)	Johann Simon Mayr; Francesco Gnecco (1800)	Venice, La Fenice	dramma di sentimento
9 October 1799	Labino e Carlotta (probably after Johann Wolfgang von Goethe; also as: Werter e Carlotta, Sabino e Carlotta)	Johann Simon Mayr	Venice, Teatro San Benedetto	farsa per musica in un solo atto
9 October 1799	L'avaro (after Carlo Goldoni)	Johann Simon Mayr	Venice, Teatro San Benedetto	farsa per musica in un solo atto
15 October 1799	Il sarto di Milano	Vincenzo Fiocchi	Venice, Teatro San Samuele	farsa giocosa per musica
24 November 1799	L'accademia in musica (after Francesco Albergati Capacelli)	Johann Simon Mayr	Venice, Teatro San Samuele	farsa giocosa per musica
5 December 1799	Antigona	Francesco Basili	Venice, La Fenice	dramma per musica
28 December 1799	Il ratto delle Sabine	Niccolò Antonio Zingarelli	Venice, La Fenice	dramma per musica
27 December 1799	La pazza giornata ovvero Il matrimonio di Figaro	Marcos António da Fonseca Portugal, then known as Marco Antonio Portogallo	Venice, Teatro San Benedetto	dramma comico per musica
May 1800	La locandiera (after Carlo Goldoni)	Johann Simon Mayr; Giuseppe Farinelli as Chi la dura la vince ossia La locandiera (Rome, Teatro Valle, Carnival 1803) and La locandiera di spirito (Parma 1805)	Vicenza, Teatro Berico	farsa giocosa per musica
Autumn 1800	I due cognomi	Vittorio Trento	Venice, Teatro San Samuele	farsa giocosa per musica
14 January 1801	Gli sposi infatuati	Sebastiano Nasolini	Venice, Teatro San Moisè	farsa giocosa per musica
21 April 1801	Ginevra di Scozia (after Orlando furioso by Ludovico Ariosto; also given as: Ariodante)	Johann Simon Mayr; Giuseppe Mosca as G. di Sc. ossia Ariodante (Turin, Carnival 1802); Marcos António Portugal (Lisbon 1805); Vincenzo Pucitta (King's Theatre, London, 1812)	Trieste, Teatro Nuovo (inaugural opera)	dramma serio eroico per musica
26 December 1801	I virtuosi (also as: I virtuosi di teatro, Venice, Carnival 1818)	Johann Simon Mayr	Venice, Teatro San Luca	farsa giocosa
26 December 1801	Argene	Johann Simon Mayr; Stefano Pavesi as Aristodemo (Naples, Teatro San Carlo, 13 August 1807)	Venice, La Fenice	dramma eroico
26 December 1801	Adelaide e Tebaldo	Raffaele Orgitano	Venice, Teatro San Benedetto	dramma sentimentale
1802	La Giulietta	Giuseppe Farinelli	Parma	dramma semi-serio
Autumn 1802	Pamela (after Samuel Richardson's Pamela, or Virtue rewarded)	Giuseppe Farinelli	Padua, Teatro Nuovo	farsa in musica
23 July 1803	Il ventaglio	Giuseppe Farinelli	Padua, Teatro Nuovo	farsa comica in musica
26 December 1803	I riti d'Efeso	Giuseppe Farinelli; Sebastiano Nasolini (1812)	Venice, La Fenice	dramma eroico
31 December 1803	Arsace e Semira	Francesco Gnecco	Venice, La Fenice	dramma eroico in musica
Spring 1804	Il sordo	I. Girace; Giuseppe Farinelli as Il finto sordo (1805)	Venice, Teatro San Benedetto	farsa comica in musica
Spring 1804	Pamela nubile	Pietro Generali	Venice, Teatro San Benedetto	farsa in musica
1804	La calzolaia	Pietro Generali	Venice	farsa comica in musica
5 July 1804	Elisa (after Eliza, ou Le voyage aux glaciers du Mont St. Bernard by Saint-Cyr)	Johann Simon Mayr	Venice, Teatro San Benedetto	dramma sentimentale per musica
8 January 1805	Eraldo ed Emma		Milan, Teatro alla Scala	dramma eroico per musica
9 February 1805	Il trionfo d'Emilia	Stefano Pavesi; António José do Rego (Lisbon, Teatro Nacional de São Carlos, 1807); Francesco Sampieri as Il trionfo di Emilia (Rome, Teatro Argentina, 19 January 1818)	Milan, Teatro alla Scala	dramma eroico per musica
Spring 1805	Don Chisciotte de la Mancia	Pietro Generali	Milan, Teatro alla Scala	dramma giocoso per musica
26 July 1805	L'amor coniugale (after Léonore, ou L'amour conjugal by Jean-Nicolas Bouilly)	Johann Simon Mayr	Padua, Teatro Nuovo	dramma di sentimento
26 October 1805	La roccia di Frauenstein (after I fuorusciti by Angelo Anelli; also given as: Gli emigrati di Franconia)	Johann Simon Mayr	Venice, La Fenice	melodramma eroi-comico
4 January 1806	Gli americani (after Voltaire's Alzire, ou les Américains)	Johann Simon Mayr; Nicola Antonio Manfroce (1810) as Alzira; Marcos António Portugal (1816) as Il trionfo di Gusmano	Venice, La Fenice	melodramma eroico
1806	Attila	Giuseppe Farinelli	unknown (est. 1807, Rome, Teatro delle Dame)	dramma serio per musica
Carnival 1807	I Cherusci (also as: Gli antichi Cherusci, Milan 1818)	Stefano Pavesi; Johann Simon Mayr (Rome, Teatro Argentina, carnival 1808)	Venice, La Fenice	melodramma eroico
19 March 1807	Elisa ovvero L'ospizio del Gran S. Bernardo	Giovanni Paisiello (using Mayr's composition)	Naples, Teatro di San Carlo	azione drammatica
Summer 1807	Amor soldato	Luigi Antonio Calegari	Venice, Teatro San Benedetto	dramma giocoso per musica
26 December 1807	Calliroe	Giuseppe Farinelli	Venice, La Fenice	melodramma eroico
27 April 1808	La festa della rosa	Stefano Pavesi; Carlo Coccia (Lisbon, 13 August 1821)	Venice, La Fenice	melodramma comico
26 December 1808	Ippolita, regina delle Amazzoni	Stefano Pavesi	Bergamo, Teatro della Società (=Teatro Sociale)	melo-dramma eroico
Carnival 1809	Guerra in pace	Nicola Giuliani	Venice, Teatro San Moisè	farsa per musica
Carnival 1809	Il trionfo delle belle	Stefano Pavesi	Venice, Teatro San Moisè	dramma eroi-comico in un atto
Autumn 1809	Zilia	Carlo Mellara	Padua, Teatro Nuovo	farsa in musica
22 February 1810	I Gauri (after Voltaire's Les Guèbres, ou la Tolérance)	Carlo Mellara	Venice, La Fenice	melodramma eroico
15 September 1810	Adelina	Pietro Generali	Venice, Teatro San Moisè	melo-dramma sentimentale
Autumn 1810	La cambiale di matrimonio	Gioachino Rossini	Venice, Teatro San Moisè	farsa comica in musica
Carnival 1811	Cecchina suonatrice di Ghironda	Pietro Generali	Venice, Teatro San Moisè	melodramma comico
Carnival 1811	L'amor figliale	Johann Simon Mayr	Venice, Teatro San Moisè	melo-dramma di sentiment
Autumn 1811	I solitarj	Carlo Coccia	Venice, Teatro San Moisè	melodramma di sentiment
26 December 1811	Idomeneo	Giuseppe Mosca; Gaetano Carulli (Milan, June 1825); Giovanni Luigi Bazzoni (Milan, Teatro Canobbiana, 24 June 1836)	Venice, La Fenice	melodramma eroico
27 December 1811	Tre mariti	Giuseppe Farinelli	Venice, Teatro San Moisè	farsa comica in musica
30 December 1812	Il qui pro quo	Ferdinando Orlandi	Macerata, Teatro Comunale	Melo-dramma comico
Carnival 1812	Il finto Stanislao, re di Polonia	Giuseppe Mosca	Venice, Teatro San Moisè	Melodramma comico in un atto
Autumn 1812	Carlo Mellara	Il marito imbarazzo	Venice, Teatro San Moisè	farsa in un atto
26 December 1812	Teodoro	Stefano Pavesi	Venice, La Fenice	melodramma eroico
6 February 1813	Tancredi	Gioachino Rossini	Venice, La Fenice	melodramma eroico
7 January 1813	I baccanti	Ferdinando Paër; Pietro Generali as I baccanti di Roma (Venice, La Fenice, 4 January 1816), later also given as I baccanali di Roma	Paris, Théâtre des Tuileries	dramma per musica
4 January 1814	Avviso al pubblico (also given as: La gazzetta)	Giuseppe Mosca	Milan, Teatro alla Scala	melodramma comico
16 February 1814	Il crescendo (possibly written by Giuseppe Foppa)	Carlo Coccia	Venice, Teatro San Moisè	?
14 July 1814	Trajano in Dacia	Felice Blangini	Munich	dramma eroico per musica
26 December 1814	Evellina	Carlo Coccia	Milan, Teatro Re	melodramma eroico
30 January 1815	La fedeltà coniugale	Antonio Brunetti	Parma, Teatro Imperiale	dramma semiserio
21 June 1815	La figlia dell'aria	Ferdinando Paini; Manuel del Pópulo Vicente Rodriguez García (New York, Teatro Italiano, March 1827)	Venice, Teatro San Moisè	melodramma eroi-comico
27 May 1815	Celanira	Stefano Pavesi	Venice, Teatro San Benedetto	melo-dramma eroico
8 June 1815	Clotilde	Carlo Coccia	Venice, Teatro San Benedetto	melo-dramma semi-serio
26 December 1815	Zoraide	Giuseppe Farinelli	Venedig, La Fenice	melodramma eroico
8 June 1816	Malvina	Nicola Vaccaj	Venice, Teatro San Benedetto	melodramma di sentimento
26 December 1816	Etelinda	Carlo Coccia; Peter von Winter (Milan, Teatro alla Scala, 23 March 1818); Angelo Pellegrini (Como, Teatro Sociale, 10 September 1831)	Venice, Teatro San Benedetto	melodramma semiserio
19 July 1817	Romilda e Costanza	Giacomo Meyerbeer	Padua, Teatro Nuovo	melodramma semiserio
26 December 1817	Lanassa (after La veuve du Malabar [1770] by Antoine Lemierre)	Johann Simon Mayr	Venice, La Fenice	melodramma eroico
1817	Adelaide e Comingio	Giovanni Pacini		melodramma semi-serio
1819	La sposa fedele	Giovanni Pacini		melodramma semiserio
1819	Emma di Resburgo	Giacomo Meyerbeer; F. Celli (1821); Carolina Uccelli as Anna di Resburgo (1835)		melodramma eroico
1820	Il conte di Lenosse	Giuseppe Nicolini		melodramma eroico
1821	L'eroe di Lancastro	Giuseppe Nicolini; Lord Burghersh (1829)		melodramma serio
1821	Maria Stuarda, regina di Scozia	Saverio Mercadante		dramma serio per musica
1821	Valmiro e Zaida	Francesco Sampieri		dramma per musica
1822	Tebaldo e Isolina	Francesco Morlacchi		melodramma eroico
1823	Semiramide	Gioachino Rossini		melodramma tragico
1824	Ilda d'Avenel	Francesco Morlacchi; Giuseppe Nicolini (1828)		melodramma eroico
1824	Il crociato in Egitto	Giacomo Meyerbeer		melodramma eroico
4 February 1826	Il paria	Michele Carafa	Venice, La Fenice	melodramma tragico
1826	Mitridate	Giovanni Tadolini		melodramma eroico
1827	Giovanna d'Arco	Nicola Vaccaj		melodramma romantico
1828	I cavalieri di Valenza	Giovanni Pacini; A. Gandini as Isabella di Lara (1830); Francesco Schira as Os cavalleiros de Valenca (1836); U. Fontana as Isabella di Lara (1836)		melodramma tragico
1828	L'orfano della selva	Carlo Coccia; N. Paoletti (1839)		melodramma comico
25 February 1830	Maria di Brabante	Albert Guillon; Alessandro Gandini (Modena 1833)	Venice, La Fenice	melo-dramma eroico
1830	Amore e mistero	Feliciano Strepponi		melodramma comico
1830	La donna bianca di Avenello	Stefano Pavesi; Gallieri (1854)		melodramma comico
8 February 1830	Malek-Adel	Giuseppe Nicolini; Benedetto Bergonzi (Cremona 1835)	Verona, Teatro Filarmonico	melodramma eroico
5 February 1831	Fenella ossia La muta di Portici (after Germain Delavigne's and Eugène Scribe's La muette de Portici)	Stefano Pavesi	Venice, La Fenice	melodramma in quattro parti
17 March 1831	Beniowski	Pietro Generali	Venice, La Fenice	melodramma
11 October 1831	Chiara di Rosenberg	Luigi Ricci	Milan, La Scala	melodramma
1831	Enrico di Monfort	Carlo Coccia		melodramma
1832	Ivanhoe	Giovanni Pacini		melodramma
1833	Gli Elvezi	Giovanni Pacini		melodramma
1833	Irene	Giovanni Pacini?		tragedia lirica
25 November 1834	Hernani (it. Ernani)	Vincenzo Gabussi	Paris, Théâtre-Italien	mélodrame en trois actes
21 February 1835	Carlo di Borgogna	Giovanni Pacini	Venice, La Fenice	melodramma romantico in tre parti
1835	La fidanzata delle isole	P. Candio		melodrammo romantico
1835	Chiara di Montalbano in Francia	Luigi Ricci		melodramma semiserio
1837	Il giuramento	Saverio Mercadante		melodramma
1837	Iginia d'Asti	S. Levy		melodramma
1837	Il rapimento	Placido Mandanici		melodramma comico
1838	Le nozze di Figaro	Luigi Ricci		melodramma comico
1838	Le due illustri rivali	Saverio Mercadante		melodramma
1838	La prigione d'Edimburgo	Federico Ricci		melodramma semiserio
1838	Alisia di Rieux	Giuseppe Lillo		melodramma
1839	Romilda	Ferdinand Hiller; L. Gavazzeni (1845); C. Boniforti as Velleda (1847); B. Prati as Amilda (1854)		melodramma
1839	Rossane	Franz Schoberlechner		melodramma
1839	Il bravo	Saverio Mercadante		melodramma
1840	Giovanna II regina di Napoli	Carlo Coccia		melodramma
1840	Ginevra degli Almieri	Samuele Levi		melodramma
1841	Clemenza di Valois	Vincenzo Gabussi		melodramma
1841	Il proscritto	Otto Nicolai		melodramma tragico
26 December 1841	Maria Padilla	Gaetano Donizetti	Milan, La Scala	melodramma in tre atti (with Gaetano Donizetti)
19 May 1842	Linda di Chamounix	Gaetano Donizetti	Vienna, Kärntnertortheater	melodramma
1846	Romea di Monfort	Carlo Pedrotti		melodramma
1851	Il Lazzarone	Francesco Berger; G. Rota; Alberto Randegger; A. Zelman		melodramma comico
1852	Il perruchiere della reggenza	Carlo Pedrotti		melodramma comico
1852	Il marito e l'amante	Federico Ricci		dramma comico
1853	Il paniere d'amore	Federico Ricci		melodramma comico
20 March 1854	Genoveffa del Brabante	Carlo Pedrotti	Milan, La Scala	melodramma
1856	I Romani in Pompejano	G. Rota		melodramma
1859	Il diavolo a quattro	Luigi Ricci		melodramma comico
1880	Tancreda	Theodor Döhler		dramma lirico
