= Madamina, il catalogo è questo =

Aria from Mozart's opera Don Giovanni

"Madamina, il catalogo è questo" (also known as the Catalogue Aria) is a bass catalogue aria from Mozart's opera Don Giovanni to an Italian libretto by Lorenzo Da Ponte, and is one of Mozart's most famous and popular arias.

It is sung by Don Giovanni's servant Leporello to Elvira during act 1 of the opera. Sung to a mostly light-hearted tune, it consists of a description and detailed count of his master's numerous conquests.

== Text ==
Madamina, il catalogo è questo
Fernando Corena, from a 1955 recording by Josef Krips and the Vienna State Opera

Madamina, il catalogo è questo
Delle belle che amò il padron mio;
un catalogo egli è che ho fatt'io;
Osservate, leggete con me.

In Italia seicento e quaranta;
In Alemagna duecento e trentuna;
Cento in Francia, in Turchia novantuna;
Ma in Ispagna son già mille e tre.

V'han fra queste contadine,
Cameriere, cittadine,
V'han contesse, baronesse,
Marchesane, principesse.
E v'han donne d'ogni grado,
D'ogni forma, d'ogni età.

Nella bionda egli ha l'usanza
Di lodar la gentilezza,
Nella bruna la costanza,
Nella bianca la dolcezza.

Vuol d'inverno la grassotta,
Vuol d'estate la magrotta;
È la grande maestosa,
La piccina è ognor vezzosa.

Delle vecchie fa conquista
Pel piacer di porle in lista;
Sua passion predominante
È la giovin principiante.

Non si picca – se sia ricca,
Se sia brutta, se sia bella;
Purché porti la gonnella,
Voi sapete quel che fa.

My dear lady, this is the list
Of the beauties my master has loved,
A list which I have compiled.
Observe, read along with me.

In Italy, six hundred and forty;
In Germany, two hundred and thirty-one;
A hundred in France; in Turkey, ninety-one;
But in Spain already one thousand and three.

Among these are peasant girls,
Maidservants, city girls,
Countesses, baronesses,
Marchionesses, princesses,
Women of every rank,
Every shape, every age.

With blondes it is his habit
To praise their kindness;
In brunettes, their faithfulness;
In the white-haired, their sweetness.

In winter he likes fat ones.
In summer he likes thin ones.
He calls the tall ones majestic.
The little ones are always charming.

He seduces the old ones
For the pleasure of adding to the list.
His greatest favourite
Is the young beginner.

It doesn't matter if she's rich,
Ugly or beautiful;
If she wears a skirt,
You know what he does.

== Structure and previous versions ==
The aria's two halves reverse the usual order of cavatina followed by cabaletta: in the first, a quick Allegro in 4/4, Leporello has a patter summarizing the number and occupations of Don Giovanni's lovers, while in the second, an Andante con moto in 3/4, in the style of a polonaise (with a melody similar to that of the Larghetto of Mozart's earlier Quintet for Piano and Winds), he describes his approaches and preferences, while Donna Elvira presumably listens in horror.

A corresponding scene in which Don Giovanni's servant expounds the catalogue of his master's lovers was already present in several versions of Don Juan's story, in opera, theatre and Commedia dell'arte: probably the initiator was a version of Il convitato di pietra (The Stone Guest) attributed to Giacinto Andrea Cicognini. The most immediate forerunner (premiering in 1787, a few months before Mozart's Don Giovanni) was the opera Don Giovanni, o sia Il convitato di pietra composed by Giuseppe Gazzaniga to a libretto by Giovanni Bertati. In Gazzaniga's opera, the aria in which Don Giovanni's servant, Pasquariello, describes his master's catalogue of lovers to Donna Elvira begins:

Dell'Italia, ed Alemagna
ve ne ho scritte cento, e tante.
Della Francia, e della Spagna
ve ne sono non so quante:
fra madame, cittadine,
artigiane, contadine,
cameriere, cuoche, e sguattere;
perché basta che sian femmine
per doverle amoreggiar.
...

From Italy and Germany
I have written here a hundred and more.
From France and from Spain
there are more than I know:
be they ladies, city women,
artisans, peasants,
waitresses, cooks and scullery maids,
it suffices they be female
for him to have to make love to them.
...

== Commentary ==
Kierkegaard discusses the aria in the section "The Immediate Stages of the Erotic, or Musical Erotic" of his Either/Or. He conjectures that the number 1003, the number of Spanish women seduced by Don Giovanni, might be a last remnant of the original legend about Don Giovanni (or Don Juan); moreover, the number 1003 being odd and somewhat arbitrary suggests in Kierkegaard's opinion that the list is not complete and Don Giovanni is still expanding it. The comic sides of this aria have dramatic and ominous undertones. Kierkegaard finds in this aria the true epic significance of the opera: condensing in large groups countless women, it conveys the universality of Don Giovanni as a symbol of sensuality and yearning for the feminine.

Some commenters have found that several devices in the text and the music manage to convey a universal meaning, something beyond a simple, humorous list of women: for instance, Luigi Dallapiccola remarks that the line "Cento in Francia, in Turchia novantuna", breaks the rhythm of octosyllables and so illuminates the whole aria. According to Massimo Mila, "this Commedia dell'arte gag (which used to be accompanied by the gesture of unrolling the catalogue's scroll towards the audience) had incalculable consequences in determining the romantic interpretation of Don Giovanni's character". Romanticism interpreted the obsession expressed in the catalogue as a longing for the absolute.
