= Giuseppe Farinelli =

Italian composer

Giuseppe Farinelli (7 May 1769 – 12 December 1836) was an Italian composer active at the end of the 18th century and the beginning of the 19th century who excelled in writing opera buffas. Considered the successor and most successful imitator of Domenico Cimarosa, the greatest of his roughly 60 operas include I riti d'Efeso (1803, Venice), La contadina bizzarra (1810, Milan) and Ginevra degli Almieri (1812, Venice). More than 2/3 of his operas were produced between 1800 and 1810 at the height of his popularity. With the arrival of Gioachino Rossini his operas became less desirable with the public, and by 1817 his operas were no longer performed. His other compositions include 3 piano forte sonatas, 3 oratorios, 11 cantatas, 5 masses, 2 Te Deums, a Stabat Mater, a Salve Regina, a Tantum ergo, numerous motets, and several other sacred works.

== Biography ==
Born Giuseppe Francesco Finco in Este, he assumed the professional name of Farinelli after the famous castrato of that name in gratitude to the singer for his help in his musical education and his protection. He studied with Lionelli in Este and with Antonio Martinelli in Venice before going to Naples in 1785 to pursue studies at the Conservatorio della Pietà dei Turchini. While at the conservatory, he was a pupil of Lorenzo Fago (harmony), Nicola Sala (counterpoint), Giacomo Tritto (composition), and Barbiello (singing). His first opera, Il dottorato di Pulcinella, displayed a talent for comedy and was performed at the conservatory in 1792 to an enthusiastic reception. His first opera performed in one of the public Italian opera houses was L’uomo indolente in Naples at the Teatro Nuovo in 1795. In 1808, his Cantata in three voices, words by Gaetano Rossi, titled Il nuovo destino was performed in celebration of the birthday of Emperor Napoleon in the hall of Monsignor Nicola Saverio Gamboni, Patriarch of Venice.

After several more years in Naples, Farinelli moved to Turin in 1810. He left there in 1817, to assume the position of maestro al cembalo at the Teatro Nuovo in Trieste. In 1819, he became maestro di cappella and organist of the Susa Cathedral, a position he held until his death in Trieste in 1836.

== Operas ==
(selection)

- Il dottorato di Pulcinella (farsa, G. Lorenzi), Naples, Conservatorio della Pietà dei Turchini, 1792
- L’uomo indolente (dramma giocoso, 2 acts, G. Palomba), Naples, Teatro Nuovo, 1795
- Annetta, o La virtù trionfa (farsa, 1 act, G. Artusi), Venice, S Samuele, 11 January 1800
- Teresa e Claudio (farsa, 2 acts, G.M. Foppa), Venice, S Luca, 9 Sept 1801
- Giulietta (dramma semiserio, G. Rossi), Parma, Ducale, carn. 1802; revised as Le lagrime d’una vedova, Padua, Nuovo, 1802
- Il Cid della Spagna (dramma per musica, 2 acts A. Sografi, after P. Corneille's Le Cid), Venice, La Fenice, 17 February 1802
- Pamela (farsa in musica, 1 act, Rossi, after C. Goldoni), Venice, S Luca, 22 Sept 1802; revised as Pamela maritata, Cingoli, 1806
- Chi la dura la vince, (melodramma buffo, 2 Acts, G. Rossi), Rome, Teatro Valle, 2 January 1803
- I riti d'Efeso (dramma eroico, 2 acts, Rossi), Venice, Fenice, 26 Dec 1803
- Odoardo e Carlotta (opera buffa, 2 acts, L. Buonavoglia), Venice, S Moisè, 12 Dec 1804
- Il finto sordo, (opera buffa, 2 acts, Angelo Anelli), Milan, Teatro Carcano, 18 April 1805
- Climene (opera seria, 2 acts), Naples, S Carlo, 27 June 1806
- Il testamento, o Seicentomila franchi [I seicentomila franchi] (farsa giocosa, 1 act, Foppa), Venice, Teatro San Moisè, 24 October 1806
- Calliroe (melodramma eroico, 2 acts, libretto by Rossi), Venice, La Fenice, 3 January 1808
- La contadina bizzarra (melodramma serio, Romanelli, after F. Livigni: La finta principessa), Milan, La Scala, 16 August 1810
- Amor muto (Farsa, Foppa), Venice, Teatro San Moisè, 1811
- Annibale in Capua (melodramma eroico, Romanelli), Milan, La Scala, 1811
- Idomeneo (melodramma eroico, 2 acts, libretto by Rossi), Venice, La Fenice, 1812
- Ginevra degli Almieri (tragicommedia, 3 acts, libretto by Foppa), Venice, Teatro San Moisè, 8 December 1812
- Lauro e Lidia (dramma eroico, 2 acts, libretto by Andreoli), Turin, Teatro Regio, 1813
- Il matrimonio per concorso (dramma giocoso, libretto by Foppa), Venice, Teatro San Moisè, 1813
- Caritea regina di Spagna (opera seria, 2 acts), Naples, San Carlo Theater, 16 September 1814
- Scipione in Cartagena (opera seria, libretto by Andreoli), Turin, Teatro Regio, 1815
- La donna di Bessarabia (dramma per musica, 1 act, libretto by Foppa), Venice, Teatro San Moisè, January 1817
