= Rivolgete a lui lo sguardo =

1789 bass aria by W. A. Mozart

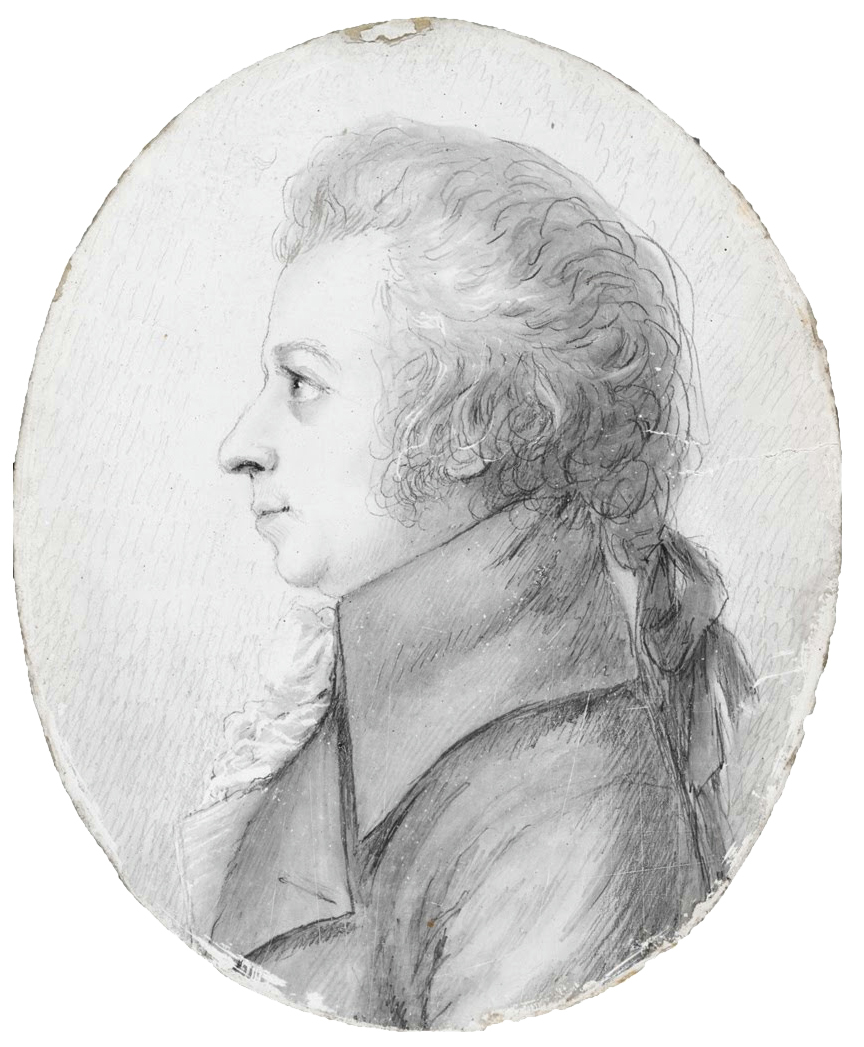
Dora Stock's 1789 miniature of Mozart

"Rivolgete a lui lo sguardo", K. 584, is a concert aria by Wolfgang Amadeus Mozart for solo bass and orchestra conceived for the role of Guglielmo the opera Così fan tutte but replaced by "Non siate ritrosi". It is considered one of the outstanding opera buffa arias for the bass voice. The text of this aria is by Lorenzo Da Ponte.

== Description ==
The aria is marked allegro, of 195 bars in common time, in the key of D major. The vocal range reaches from G_{2} to F♯_{4}. In this catalogue aria, the singer Guglielmo declares how his fiancée Fiordiligi is unlikely to betray him due to his many admirable qualities and his faithfulness for her. He lists how he and his fellow "Albanian" Ferrando possess qualities such as dancing, singing and impressive physical characteristics, and how they are both without equal from Canada to Vienna. An elaborate solo for the oboe commences at bar 94. A typical performance lasts for around five and a half minutes.

The work calls for two oboes, two bassoons, two trumpets, timpani and strings.

== History ==
Composed in December 1789, the aria was first published around the year 1855. The original singer was Francesco Benucci, who notably sung the title role in The Marriage of Figaro and Leporello in Don Giovanni. In his own catalogue, Mozart referred to the title as Rivolgete à me (note also the accent on a). In what Ian Woodfield calls a "drastic step", the aria was replaced for dramatic reasons by the more lightweight brevity of "Non siate retrosi".

However, "Rivolgete a lui lo sguardo" remains a popular and often performed concert piece today, and is sometimes included in full productions of the opera. In compensation for the deletion of this showpiece aria, Mozart may have altered Benucci's second act aria, the flamboyant "Donne mie", adding new musical material and parts for trumpets and timpani. The original manuscript consists of 12 pages, 24 sides, and is housed in the Berlin State Library.

== Text ==
Rivolgete a lui lo sguardo
E vedrete come sta:
Tutto dice, io gelo, io ardo
Idol mio, pietà, pietà,
Io ardo, io gelo, io ardo
Idol mio, pietà, pietà,

E voi cara un sol momento
Il bel ciglio a me volgete
E nel mio ritroverete
Quel che il labbro dir non sa.

Un Orlando innamorato
Non è niente in mio confronte;
Un Medoro il sen piagato
Verso lui per nulla io conto:

Son di foco i miei sospiri
Son di bronzo i suoi desiri,
Se si parla poi di merto
Certo io sono e egli è certo
Che gli uguali non si trovano
Da Vienna al Canadà,

Siam due Credi per ricchezza,
Due Narcisi per bellezza
In amor i Marcantoni
Verso noi sarian buffoni
Siam più forti d'un ciclopo,
Letterati al par di Esopo.

Se balliamo un Pich ne cede
Sì gentil e snello è il piede,
Se cantiam col trillo solo
Facciam torto all'usignuolo,
E qualch'altro capitale
Abbiam poi che alcun non sa.

Bella, bella, tengon sodo:
Se ne vanno ed io ne godo!
Eroine di costanza,
specchi son di fedeltà.

Look at him
And you will see how it is:
Everything he says, I freeze, I burn
My idol, mercy, mercy,
I burn, I freeze, I burn
My idol, mercy

And you darling, for just one moment
Turn your beautiful eyes to me
And in mine you will find
What the others do not know.

An Orlando in love
It's nothing compared to me;
Medoro the wounded knight
His fame cannot compete.

My sighs are of fire
His desires are of bronze,
If we talk about abilities
Then no equals
To us may be found
From Vienna to Canada.

The two of us are rich as Croesus,
We are two daffodils of beauty
The Marc Anthonys compared
To us are buffoons
We are stronger than Cyclops,
More knowledgable than Aesop.

If we dance, Le Picq bows to
our refined narrow feet,
If we sing with a simple trill
It outshines the nightingale,
Our physical bodies
Are beyond compare.

Beautiful, beautiful fiances,
You will hold firm:
Our heroines of constancy,
Our mirrors of fidelity.
