= Gabussi =

Gabussi is an Italian surname. Notable people with the surname include:

- Rita Gabussi (c. 1815–1891), Italian opera singer
- Vincenzo Gabussi (1800–1846), Italian classical composer
