= Elżbieta Szmytka =

Polish operatic soprano

- Born: 1956 (age 69–70); Prochowice, Lower Silesian Voivodeship, Poland
- Education: Academy of Music in Kraków
- Occupation: Operatic soprano
- Organizations: Vienna State Opera

Elżbieta Szmytka (born 1956) is a Polish operatic soprano. She has appeared internationally, including at the Vienna State Opera, where she performed Mozart roles such as Blonde in Die Entführung aus dem Serail and Despina in Così fan tutte. In 1999, she recorded Chopin's Polish songs and performed in a concert in 2018 celebrating a century of Polish independence as a soloist in Górecki's Symphony of Sorrowful Songs.

== Life and career ==
Born in Prochowice, Lower Silesian Voivodeship, Szmytka studied with Helena Łazarska. and graduated from the Academy of Music in Kraków. She made her debut as Susanna in Mozart's Le nozze di Figaro at the Opera Krakowska. She appeared at the Vienna State Opera as Blonde in Mozart's Die Entführung aus dem Serail, Despina in his Così fan tutte, and Papagena in Die Zauberflöte. She also performed at the Grand Théâtre de Genève, the Opéra Garnier, La Monnaie in Brussels, the Dutch National Opera in Amsterdam, the Berlin State Opera, the Teatro Colón in Buenos Aires, and at festivals such as the Salzburg Festival, the Aix-en-Provence Festival and the Glyndebourne Festival.

Szmytka's repertoire includes other Mozart roles, such as Cinna in Lucio Silla, Donna Anna in Don Giovanni, both Ilia and Elettra in Idomeneo, and Vitellia in La clemenza di Tito. She also has sung Adina in Donizetti's L'elisir d'amore, Gilda in Verdi's Rigoletto, the title role in his La traviata (in Berlin, Brussels and Düsseldorf), Nanetta in his Falstaff, and Oscar in his Un ballo in maschera. In operas by Richard Strauss, she has sung Zerbinetta in Ariadne auf Naxos and Sophie in Der Rosenkavalier.

Szmytka has performed under the direction of conductors such as Claudio Abbado, Pierre Boulez, Sylvain Cambreling, John Eliot Gardiner, Nikolaus Harnoncourt, Neville Marriner, Antonio Pappano, John Pritchard and Georg Solti.

In 2018, she performed in a concert celebrating a century of Polish independence, as a soloist in Górecki's Symphony of Sorrowful Songs with the Szczecin Philharmonic Orchestra conducted by Wojciech Michniewski.

== Recordings ==
The German National Library hold recordings by Szmytka, including:

- Così fan tutte, conducted by Neville Marriner, OCLC 972904455 DNB-IDN 995827761
- La finta giardiniera, OCLC 130941898
- Die Entführung aus dem Serail (Blonde), OCLC 42530533 DNB-IDN 997391677
- Don Giovanni Tenorio, composed by Giuseppe Gazzaniga, conducted by Bruno Weil, OCLC 724916817 DNB-IDN 352666455
- Die lustige Witwe, conducted by Franz Welser-Möst, OCLC 257582103 DNB-IDN 360263712
- Szymanowski's King Roger, with Thomas Hampson, conducted by Simon Rattle, OCLC 163882242 DNB-IDN 357354117

In 1999, she recorded Chopin's Polish songs with pianist Malcolm Martineau (OCLC 950991475). She recorded works by Karol Szymanowski with the City of Birmingham Symphony Orchestra and Chorus, conducted by Simon Rattle, including Stabat Mater and Litany to the Virgin Mary, Op. 59 (OCLC 725006488 DNB-IDN 359405061). A critic noted her "liquid tones".
