= Tieteberga =

Opera by Antonio Vivaldi

- Dramma per musica by Antonio Vivaldi
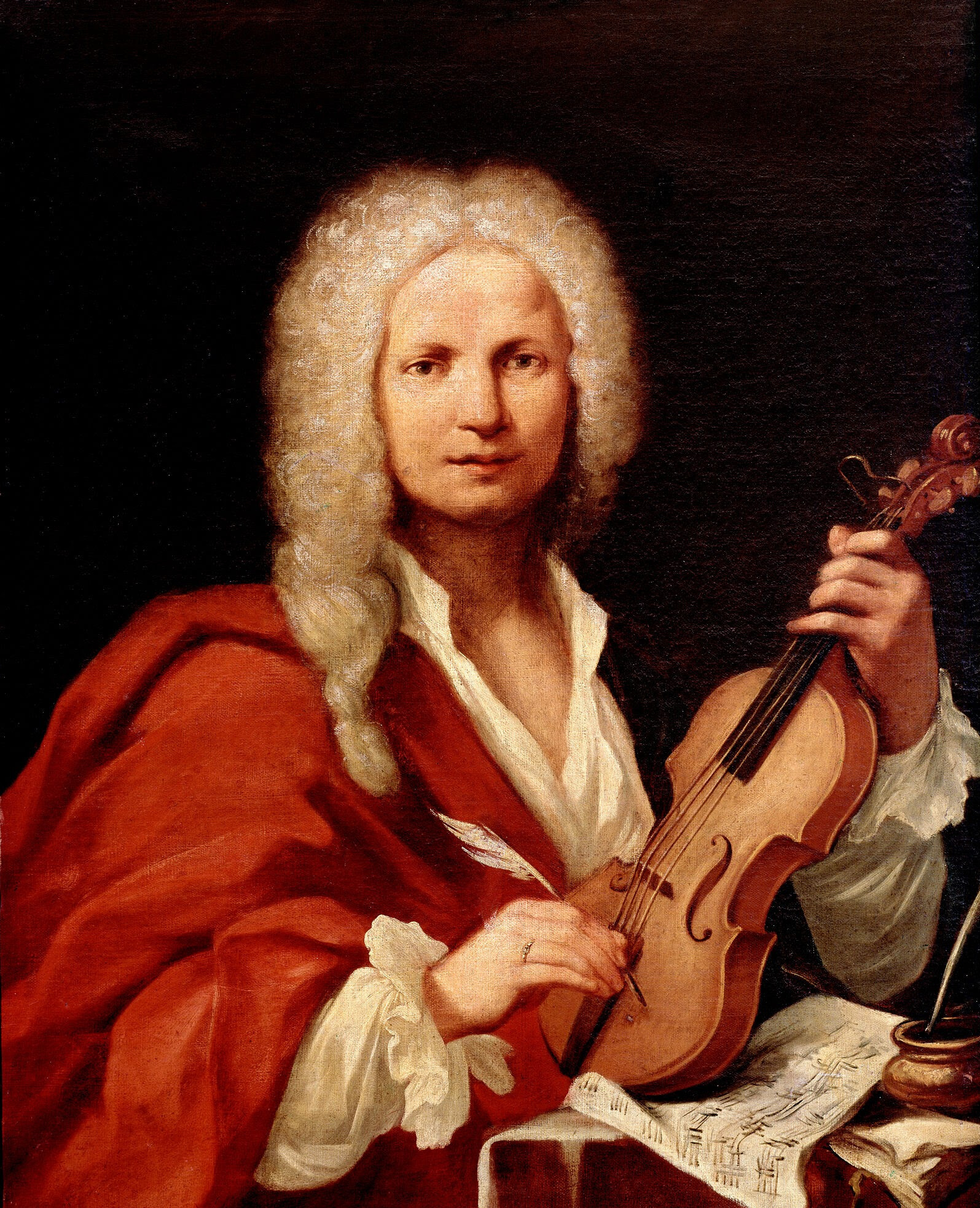
- Putative portrait of Antonio Vivaldi, c. 1723
- Librettist: Antonio Maria Lucchini
- Language: Italian
- Premiere: 16 October 1717; Teatro San Moisè, Venice

Tieteberga (RV 737) is a partially lost dramma per musica by Antonio Vivaldi. The Italian libretto was by Antonio Maria Lucchini.

The opera was first performed at the Teatro San Moisè in Venice on 16 October 1717. The opera included nine arias by other composers.

== Roles ==
Cast	Voice type	Premiere, 16 October 1717
Ercinio	contralto castrato	Francesco Braganti
Guido	soprano (en travesti)	Rosa Venturini
Clotilde	soprano	Chiara Orlandi
Valdrada	contralto	Antonia Merighi
Tieteberga	contralto	Costanza Maccari
Lotario	contralto castrato	Francesco Natali
Marciano	bass	Annibale Imperatori

== Recordings ==
- " L'innocenza sfortunata" and "Se fido rivedro" Ann Hallenberg (mezzo-soprano), Modo Antiquo, Federico Maria Sardelli (conductor), 2005
- "Sento in seno ch'in pioggia di lagrime" (Lotario) Philippe Jaroussky, Ensemble Matheus, Jean-Christophe Spinosi (conductor), 2006
- "La gloria del mio sangue" Nathalie Stutzmann, Orfeo 55 2011
