= Giovanni Valentini (classical era composer) =

Italian composer, poet and painter (c. 1750–1804)

Giovanni Valentini (c. 1750 – 1804) was an Italian classical era composer, poet and painter. He is best remembered for his innovative instrumental music. Among his many works are two operas, La statua matematica and Le nozze in contrasto, the latter of which premiered at the Teatro San Moisè, Venice, in November 1774.
