= Adelina (opera) =

Opera composed by Pietro Generali

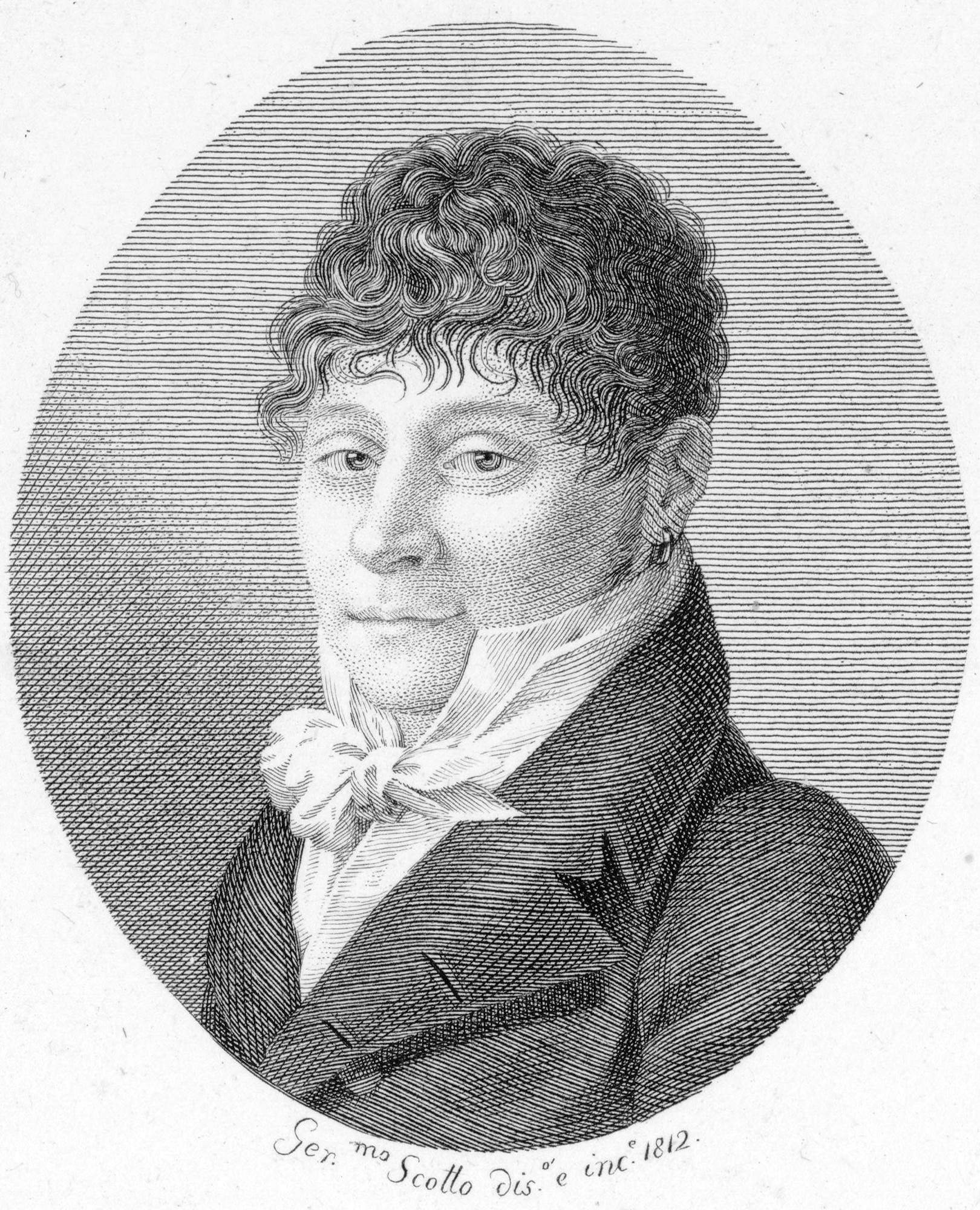
Pietro Generali

Adelina is an opera farsa (described as a ‘melodramma sentimentale’) in one act, by the Italian composer Pietro Generali with words by Gaetano Rossi. It was first performed at the Teatro San Moisè in Venice on either 15 or 16 September 1810. It premiered just before the first of Rossini's farse at the same theatre.

For the inspiration for his libretto Rossi turned to Lisbeth, a drame lyrique with words by Edmond de Favières, set by André Grétry and first performed in 1797 at the Salle Favart in Paris. The libretto is permeated by the ideals of Rousseau and the French Revolution.

== Roles ==
Role	Voice type	Premiere Cast, 15 or 16 September 1810 (Conductor: )
Adelina	soprano	Rosa Morandi
Varner, her father	bass	Luigi Raffanelli
Simone, neighbour	baritone	Nicola de Grecis
Carlotta, Adelina's sister	mezzo-soprano	Clementina Lanari
Erneville	tenor	Tommaso Ricci
Firmino, Erneville's friend	bass	Domenico Remolini
Jacopo		

== Synopsis ==
The setting is a beautiful view outside Zürich with two rocks connected by a rustic bridge under which flows a stream. There is a courtyard with Varner's home, where he lives with his daughters Adelina and Carlotta to the right, and to the left the house of Simone.

Adelina returns home after a long stay with a relative. She has an illegitimate child and is anxious about breaking the news to her father. When she meets the neighbour and teacher Simone (who continually quotes Latin maxims), she asks for his help. Simone suggests an anonymous letter to Varner, who is horrified when he learns of his daughter's situation. Firmino, and then Erneville arrive on the scene, and Erneville, the child's father is reunited with Adelina. Varner considers leaving the town, to avoid shame and disgrace. Following further intervention by Simone, the opera ends with a marriage and forgiveness.

== Musical numbers ==
Overture
1. Introduction
2. Aria – Adelina
3. Trio – Adelina, Varner, Simone
4. Cavatine – Erneville
5. Recitative and Duet – Adelina and Erneville
6. Aria – Simone
7. Recitative and Aria – Adelina
8. Finale
