= I riti d'Efeso =

I riti d'Efeso is a dramma eroico per musica or opera in 2 acts and 26 scenes by composer Giuseppe Farinelli. The work uses an Italian language libretto by Gaetano Rossi. The work premiered at La Fenice in Venice on 26 December 1803 in a double bill with Filippo Beretti's Atamaro e Obeide.

== Roles ==
Role	Voice type	Premiere cast, 26 December 1803 (Conductor: )
Aspasia	soprano	Rosalinda Grossi Silva
Neandro	sopranista	Filippo Boccucci
Agenore	tenor	Diomiro Tramezzani
Glaucia-Gran Gierofante	bass	Zenobio Vitarelli
Clearco	soprano	Brigida Banti
Pamene	tenor	Luigi Santi
Argia	soprano	Angela Rotondi
