= Charles Le Picq =

French dancer and choreographer (1745–1806)

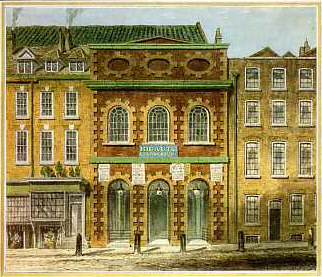
London King's Theater in the Haymarket, where Charles Le Picq worked from 1782 until 1785

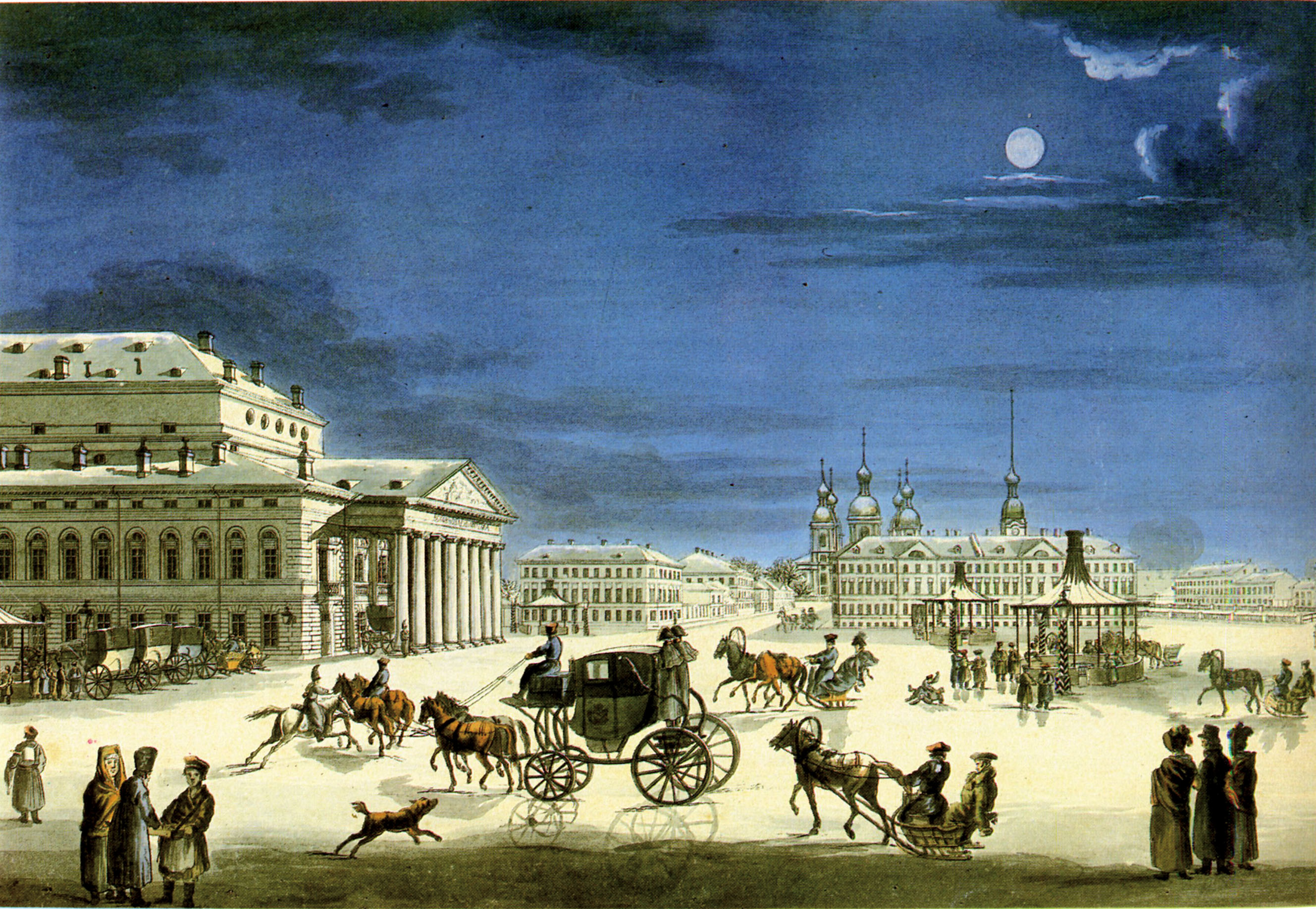
Bolshoi Theatre in Saint Petersburg, where Charles Le Picq worked from 1786 until 1803

Charles Felix Richard Auguste Le Picq (2 March 1745, Strasbourg – 29 October 1806, Saint Petersburg) was a French dancer and choreographer.

== Biography ==
Le Picq was the grandson of the renowned French dance teacher Antoine Le Picq (1673–1759), and the son of a dancer and dance teacher Jean Felix Charles Le Picq (born 1713) and his wife Marie Magdaleine Kugler (1720-1775).

Initially, he learned to dance in Paris with Jean-Baptiste-François Dehesse / Deshayes (1705–1779). Later, he was in Stuttgart (1760–1764) a pupil of Jean-Georges Noverre (1727–1810), one of the creators of modern ballet (ballet d'action). In the years 1765 to 1777, his stage partner was a well-known Italian dancer, Anna Binetti. He was called the "Apollo of the Dance" and performed in many countries, such as Württemberg (1760–1764 and 1770), Austria (1764–1765, 1767–1769 and 1771), Poland (1765–1767 and 1785), Italy (1769–1782), France (1776), Spain (1780), England (1782–1785) and Russia (1786–1803). In the Mozart aria "Rivolgete a lui lo sguardo" (an alternate aria from Così fan tutte), Guglielmo boasts that he and Ferrando dance so elegantly "that Le Picq would bow before us".

In 1786, Charles Le Pic was invited to Russia, to St. Petersburg, to head the Imperial ballet. He arrived in St. Petersburg with his wife, who also got an invitation to work in the Imperial ballet, and his stepson. The family remained forever in Russia. He was a huge influence on the development of Russian ballet. Thanks to him, Noverre's book Lettres sur la danse (Letters on the Dance) was published in Russia (in French) in 1803. He advised in 1801 to invite the French choreographer Charles Didelot to Russia.

His wife and stage partner was Bavarian ballerina Gertrude Ablöscher-Rossi (1756–1799). His stepson was Carlo Rossi (1775–1849), who became the famous Russian architect, son of Gertrude's first husband, Italian dancer and choreographer Domenico Rossi. The children of Charles Le Picq and Gertrude were: Caroline (the second wife of the Spanish composer Vincente Martín y Soler), Henriette Wilhelmine (wife of a German pharmacist Johann Moritz Bartels) and Marie Gertrude (wife of a French dancer and ballet master Auguste Antoine Poireau), they also had a son Charles. They were short dancers in Russia at the end of the 18th century.
