= Carolina Uccelli =

Italian composer (1801–1858)

Carolina Uccelli (1801–1858) was an Italian composer known for opera.

== Biography ==
Carolina Pazzini was born into a minor noble family in Florence and married Filippo Uccelli, a prominent surgeon from Pisa who supported her music career.

She made her debut as a composer with the performance of the sacred opera Saul at the Teatro della Pergola in Florence on 21 June 1830. Uccelli wrote both libretto and music for the opera. A two-act melodrama Anna di Resburgo with a libretto by Gaetano Rossi was performed in Naples in 1832. It employed a libretto previously set by Meyerbeer in his opera Emma di Resburgo (1819). It enjoyed only two performances. Its failure is generally ascribed to the similarity of its plot to Donizetti's Lucia di Lammermoor, which had proved a great success just a month earlier in Naples. The overture of her opera Eufemio da Messina was performed in Milan in 1833.

At some point she won a testimonial from Rossini, who noted her "expressiveness and elegance in declamation and melody".

When her husband died in 1843, Uccelli moved to Paris with her daughter Giulia. The two women performed concert tours in Belgium, the Netherlands and Switzerland. Uccelli died in Florence in 1858.

Anna di Resburgo had its modern premiere on 20 July 2024 in Montclair, New Jersey, in a staging by Teatro Nuovo. Alex Ross, writing in The New Yorker, said it "gives the impression of a wide-ranging musical mind that possesses historical consciousness and experimental intelligence in equal measure". He had reservations about some of her innovations, but praised her modifications to the libretto and thought that "throughout, Uccelli’s orchestration adds fascinating nuances to the narrative". In the New York Times Joshua Barone was equally enthusiastic.

== Works ==
- Saul 1830 opera
- Anna di Resburgo 1832 opera
- Eufemio da Messina 1833 opera
- Sulla morte di Maria Malibran cantata for chorus and orchestra
- Quattro ariette e due cavatine for voice and keyboard, printed, Milan 1827
