= Calliroe (Farinelli) =

Calliroe is a melodramma eroico or opera in 2 acts and 23 scenes by composer Giuseppe Farinelli. The work uses an Italian language libretto by Gaetano Rossi. The work premiered at La Fenice in Venice on 3 January 1808 in a double bill with the house premiere of Urbano Garzia's ballet Il calunniatore punito ossia Il conte Lenosse.

== Roles ==
Role	Voice type	Premiere cast, 3 January 1808 (Conductor: )
Calliroe	soprano	Francesca Festa Maffei
Agenore	contralto	Augusta Schmaltz
Oreso	tenor	Francesco Fiorini
Pamene	bass	Michele Benedetti
Idante	soprano	Anna Cajani
Euriso	tenor	Pietro Vasoli
Mintea	soprano	Giuditta Favini
The Oracle	bass	
