= L'arbore di Diana =

- Opera by Vicente Martín y Soler
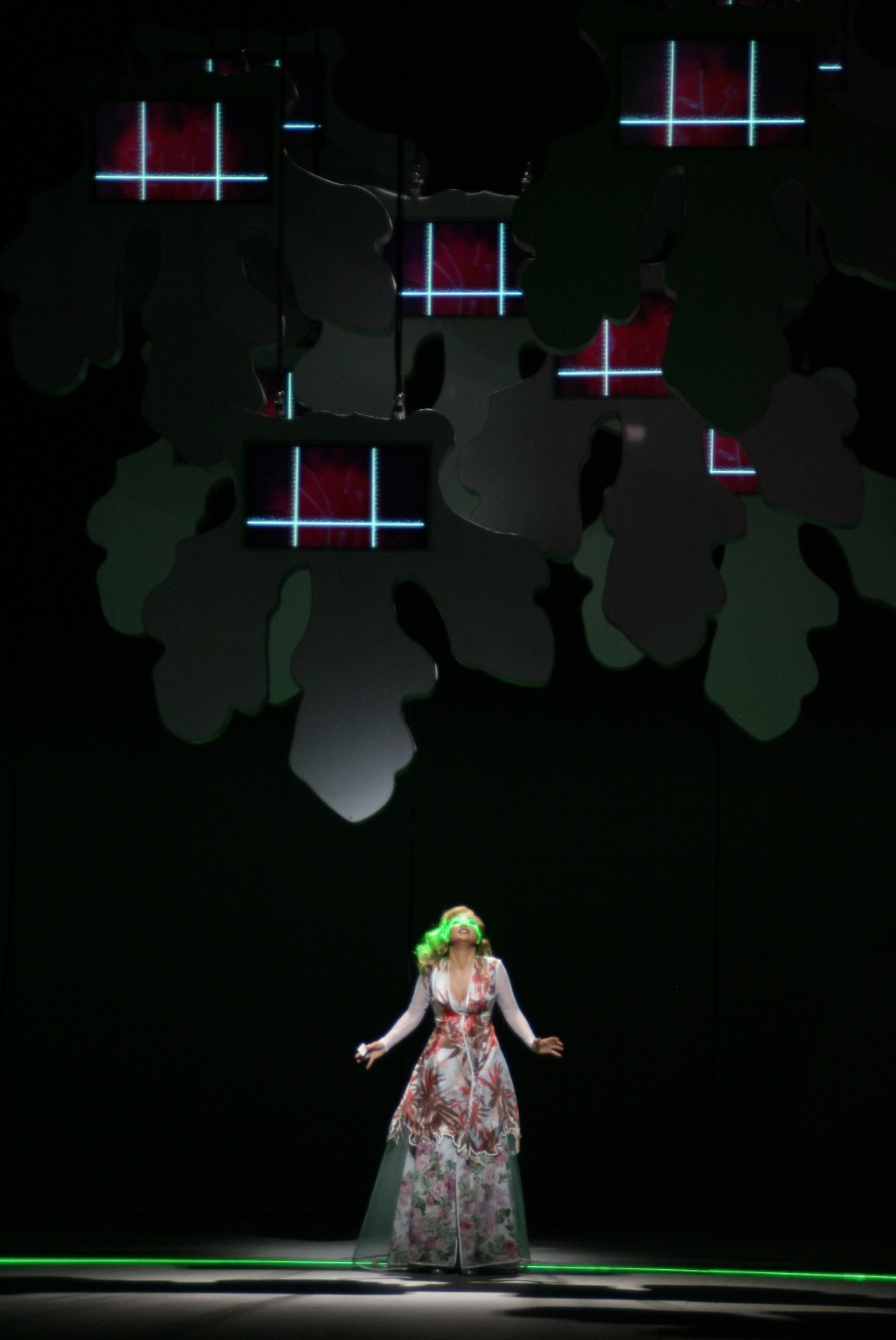
- Laura Aikin (Diana). A scene from the 2009 production of the opera at the Gran Teatre del Liceu, Barcelona
- Librettist: Lorenzo Da Ponte
- Premiere: 1 October 1787; Burgtheater, Vienna

L'arbore di Diana (The Tree of Diana) is an opera in two acts composed by Vicente Martín y Soler, with an original libretto by Lorenzo da Ponte. It premiered at the Burgtheater in Vienna on 1 October 1787.

== Background and performance history ==
Da Ponte's librettos for L'arbore di Diana and Così fan tutte were the only ones of his not taken from an existing plot. The opera's premiere on 1 October 1787 marked a visit to Vienna of the niece of Holy Roman Emperor Joseph II, the Archduchess Maria Teresa, who was on her way to Dresden to marry Prince Anton Clemens of Saxony in person (they had been married by proxy in Florence the month before). The work was enormously successful in its day, but Martín's operas have since fallen from the repertoire. A revival was performed during the 2007/2008 season at the Theater Bielefeld in North Rhine Westphalia, Germany. The opera was revived and recorded in Valencia in 2008 at the Palau de les Arts Reina Sofía. It has also been revived in Barcelona in 2009 at the Gran Teatre del Liceu, at the Minnesota Opera in 2017 conducted by Michael Christie, and at New England Conservatory in 2023.

The music consists of "an amalgam of through-composed conversations and encounters, punctuated by brief songs and ariettas"; the plot concerns the goddess Diana's attempts to defend her island as a stronghold of chastity. When confronted by the good-looking shepherd Doristo her defences fall down.

== Roles ==
Role	Voice type	Premiere Cast 1 October 1787
Amore	soprano	Luisa Laschi-Mombelli
Diana	soprano	Anna Bosello-Marichelli
Doristo	bass	Stefano Mandini
Endimione	tenor	Vincenzo Calvesi
Silvio	tenor	Nicolò del Sole
Britomarte	soprano	Louise Villeneuve
Chloe	contralto	
Clizia	mezzo-soprano	

== Recordings ==
- Soler: L'arbore di Diana – Laura Aikin (Diana), Michael Maniaci (Amore), Ainhoa Gramendia (Britomarte/Genio 1), Marisa Martins (Clizia/Genio 2), Jossie Pérez (Cloe/Genio 3), Charles Workman (Silvio), Steve Davislim (Endimione), Marco Vinco (Doristo); Gran Teatre del Liceu Orchestra and Chorus; Harry Bicket (conductor); Francisco Negrin (director). Recorded Barcelona, 2009. Label: Dynamic DVD 33651

== Score ==
L'arbore di Diana, critical edition by Leonardo Waisman, IBERAUTOR/ICCMU. Madrid, 2001. ISBN 84-8048-379-2
