= Il barone di Trocchia =

Il barone di Trocchia was the first of fifty-one operas written by Italian composer Giuseppe Gazzaniga. The two-act intermezzo has an Italian libretto by Francesco Cerlone and premiered at the Teatro Nuovo in Naples, Italy during carnival 1768.

== Roles ==
Role	Voice type	Premiere Cast, 1768 (Conductor: - )
Fulvia		Maria Cecilia Colletti
Luigi		Costantino Busnetti
Cilla Panarella		Vincenza Caravano
Nardone		Giuseppe Moretti
