= Martino Carbonaro =

Martino Carbonaro, o sia Gli sposi fuggitivi was the last of fifty-one operas written by Italian composer Giuseppe Gazzaniga. The farsa has an Italian libretto by Giuseppe Foppa and premiered at the Teatro San Moisè in Venice, Italy in 1801.

== Roles ==
Role	Voice type	Premiere Cast, 1801 (Conductor: - )
Isabella		Orsola Fabrizj Bertini
Lucindo		Giovanni Battista Benelli
Agrippa		Cesare Biscossi
Martino		Giambattista Brocchi
Tognino		Clemente Acquisti
