= Teatro San Moisè =

Theatre in Venice, Italy

Coordinates: 45.4331°N 12.3361°E

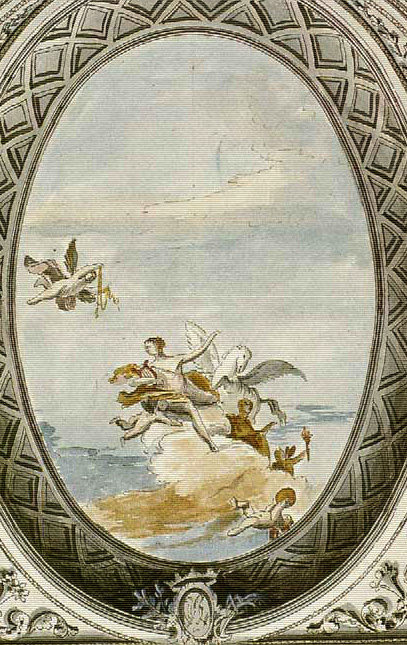
Watercolour depiction of a ceiling fresco in the Teatro San Moisè

The Teatro San Moisè was a theatre and opera house in Venice, active from 1620 to 1818. It was in a prominent location near the Palazzo Giustinian and the church of San Moisè at the entrance to the Grand Canal.

== History ==
Built by the San Bernaba branch of the Giustiniani family c. 1620, it was originally a prose theatre. Its first opera production was Claudio Monteverdi's (now lost) opera L'Arianna in 1640 by which time the ownership had passed to the Zane family who had long intermarried with the Giustiniani. It was used by the Ferrari company, and the librettist Giovanni Faustini was one of the theatre's first impresarios.

From the outset it was one of the smaller theatres of Venice, but also one of the most influential. In 1668 it was enlarged to 800 seats, although this did not result in a significant increase on the size of the stage which limited the theatre's ability to stage large-scale productions throughout its existence. In 1674 theatre was revived by the impresario Francesco Santurini, who caused a revolution by halving the price of tickets to 2 lire, leading to an opera 'boom' and a further proliferation of active theatres in the city.

During the early 18th century Gasparini, Vivaldi and Albinoni were all active in San Moisè. During the 1740s, Neapolitan opera buffa reached Venice and San Moisè was one of the first theatres to concentrate on this genre, with works by Baldassare Galuppi, in partnership with Carlo Goldoni, being seen in the theatre. This trend continued through most of the century. In the 1770s and 1780s the theatre was under the control of the prolific librettist Giovanni Bertati, the Poeta Cesareo ("Imperial Poet") of the Italian Opera in Vienna, who concentrated on drammi giocosi with Pasquale Anfossi and other composers.

The San Moisè finally closed in 1818 after producing a series of farse by Rossini. It later re-opened as a puppet theatre and was known as the Teatro Minerva. In July 1896, the Minerva saw Venice's first cinema projection when the Lumière brothers brought their equipment to the theatre. It was still being used as a cinema in 1906 but was later demolished. By the end of the 20th century the site was occupied by a shop and a block of flats.

== Premieres at the theatre ==
- 1642: L'amore innamorato by Francesco Cavalli
- 1649: L'Euripo by Francesco Cavalli
- 1685: Clearco in Negroponte by Domenico Gabrielli
- 1716: La costanza trionfante degl'amori e de gl'odii by Vivaldi
- 1717: Tieteberga by Vivaldi
- 1718: Artabano, re dei Parti by Vivaldi
- 1718: Armida al campo d'Egitto by Vivaldi
- 1718: Gl’inganni per vendetta by Vivaldi
- 1750: Il mondo nella luna by Baldassare Galuppi
- 1757: Merope by Florian Leopold Gassmann
- 1758: Issipile by Leopold Gassmann
- 1759: Gli uccellatori by Leopold Gassmann
- 1760: Filosofia in amore by Leopold Gassmann
- 1761: Li tre amanti ridicoli by Baldassare Galuppi
- 1762: Un pazzo ne fa cento by Leopold Gassmann
- 1765: L'amore in ballo by Giovanni Paisiello
- 1766: Le serve rivali by Tommaso Traetta
- 1773: L'innocente fortunata by Giovanni Paisiello
- 1774: Le nozze in contrasto by Giovanni Valentini
- 1775: La contadina incivilita by Pasquale Anfossi
- 1775: Didone abbandonata by Pasquale Anfossi
- 1775: L'avaro by Pasquale Anfossi
- 1776: Le nozze disturbate by Giovanni Paisiello
- 1777: Lo sposo disperato by Pasquale Anfossi
- 1778: Ezio by Pasquale Anfossi
- 1778: La forza delle donne by Pasquale Anfossi
- 1779: Azor Re di Kibinga by Pasquale Anfossi
- 1781: Gli amanti canuti by Pasquale Anfossi
- 1781: Il trionfo di Arianna by Pasquale Anfossi
- 1787: L'orfanella americana by Pasquale Anfossi
- 1787: Don Giovanni Tenorio by Giuseppe Gazzaniga
- 1801: Martino Carbonaro by Giuseppe Gazzaniga
- 1802: Le metamorfosi di Pasquale by Gaspare Spontini
- 1810: Adelina by Pietro Generali
- 1810: La cambiale di matrimonio by Gioachino Rossini
- 1811: L'equivoco stravagante by Gioachino Rossini
- 1812: L'inganno felice by Gioachino Rossini
- 1812: La scala di seta by Gioachino Rossini
- 1812: L'occasione fa il ladro by Gioachino Rossini
- 1813: Il signor Bruschino by Gioachino Rossini
- 1815: Bettina vedova by Giovanni Pacini

== See also ==
- Opera houses and theatres in Venice
