= Don Giovanni Tenorio =

1787 opera by Giovanni Gazzaniga

Don Giovanni, o sia Il convitato di pietra, (English: Don Giovanni, or The Stone Guest) also known as Don Giovanni Tenorio is a one-act opera (dramma giocoso) by the Italian composer Giuseppe Gazzaniga. The opera was first performed at the Teatro San Moisè, Venice, on 5 February 1787, the same day as Francesco Gardi's opera Don Giovanni in the same city at the Teatro San Samuele. The libretto, by Giovanni Bertati, is based on the legend of Don Juan as told by Tirso de Molina in his play The Trickster of Seville and the Stone Guest (c. 1630), leading to comparisons with Mozart's Don Giovanni which had its premiere later in 1787. Mozart's librettist, Lorenzo Da Ponte, certainly knew the earlier opera. Gazzaniga's work is much shorter than Mozart's, and originally formed part of a double-bill with another piece, Il capriccio drammatico.

== Roles ==
- Don Giovanni (tenor) The role was created by Antonio Baglioni, who sang Don Ottavio in the premiere of Mozart's opera.
- Pasquariello, Don Giovanni's manservant (bass)
- The Commendatore (bass)
- Donna Anna, the Commendatore's daughter (soprano)
- Duca Ottavio, Donna Anna's fiancé (tenor)
- Donna Elvira, a former lover of Don Giovanni (soprano)
- Donna Ximena, a lady from Villena (soprano)
- Biagio, a peasant (bass)
- Maturina, Biagio's fiancée (soprano)
- Lanterna, Don Giovanni's cook (tenor)

== Synopsis ==
With his manservant Pasquariello keeping watch outside, Don Giovanni attempts to seduce Donna Anna. Donna Anna's father, the Commendatore, challenges Giovanni to a duel and is killed. Ottavio, Anna's fiancé, swears vengeance. Meanwhile Don Giovanni encounters his old lover, Donna Elvira outside the walls of Villena. As Don Giovanni woos Donna Ximena, Pasquariello gives Elvira a detailed account all his master's amorous conquests. Maturina and Biagio, accompanied by a party of peasants, arrive. Maturina and Biagio are about to be married, but Don Giovanni chases off a furious Biagio and attempts (unsuccessfully) to seduce Maturina.

Don Giovanni and Pasquariello follow Ottavio when he visits the Commendatore's tomb. Pasquariello is terrified when he hears the statue accept an invitation to dinner. Later that evening at Don Giovanni's house, Elvira pleads with the Don to mend his ways. She leaves when he refuses. Giovanni and Pasquariello enjoy their dinner and sing the praises of food, wine, and Venetian women. The statue suddenly arrives and drags Don Giovanni to his death. Ottavio and the women enter. Pasquariello and Lanterna describe Giovanni's fate to them. The opera ends as all rejoice at his downfall.

== Recordings ==
Gazzaniga: Don Giovanni – Orchestra e coro della RCA Italiana

- Conductor: Herbert Handt
- Principal singers: Laerte Malagutti, Alfonso Nanni, James Loomis, Maria Minetto, Luciana Ticinelli-Fattori
- Recording date: 1963
- Label: Nuova Era (CD)

Gazzaniga: Don Giovanni – Kammerchor Stuttgart, Tafelmusik Baroque Orchestra

- Conductor: Bruno Weil
- Principal singers: Douglas Johnson, Luciana Serra, Elżbieta Szmytka, Edith Schmid-Lienbacher, Ferruccio Furlanetto, Carlo Allemanno
- Recording date: 1991
- Label: Sony Vivarte (CD) SK 46693
