= Vincenzo Gabussi =

Italian classical composer (1800–1846)

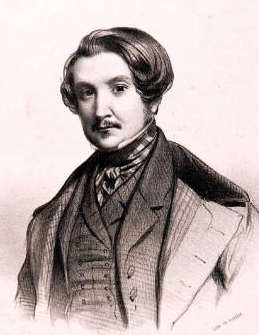
- Vincenzo Gabussi by Marie-Alexandre Alophe (1835)
- Born: 1800; Bologna, Italy
- Died: 12 September 1846 (aged 45–46); London, United Kingdom
- Occupation: Composer

Vincenzo Gabussi (1800 – 1846) was an Italian classical composer.

== Life and career ==
Born in Bologna, from a young age Gabussi studied music under Stanislao Mattei, and made his operatic debut in 1825, with the opera I furbi al cimento. Shortly afterwards he moved to London, where he successfully engaged as a singing teacher for members of the high society. Occasionally he returned to opera composition, in 1834 with Ernani and in 1841 with Clemenza di Valois, both with librettos by Gaetano Rossi. The resounding failure of the latter at La Scala in Milan in 1842 prompted Gabussi to abandon opera forever.

Gabussi garnered major success in his prolific chamber music composition of romances and more than a hundred duets, trios, and quartets for piano and voice. Despite the conventional verses and simple melodies, or perhaps because of them, his compositions enjoyed great success with the public, both in London and in Italy, and led him to be nicknamed "New Schubert".
