= Pietro Generali =

Italian composer

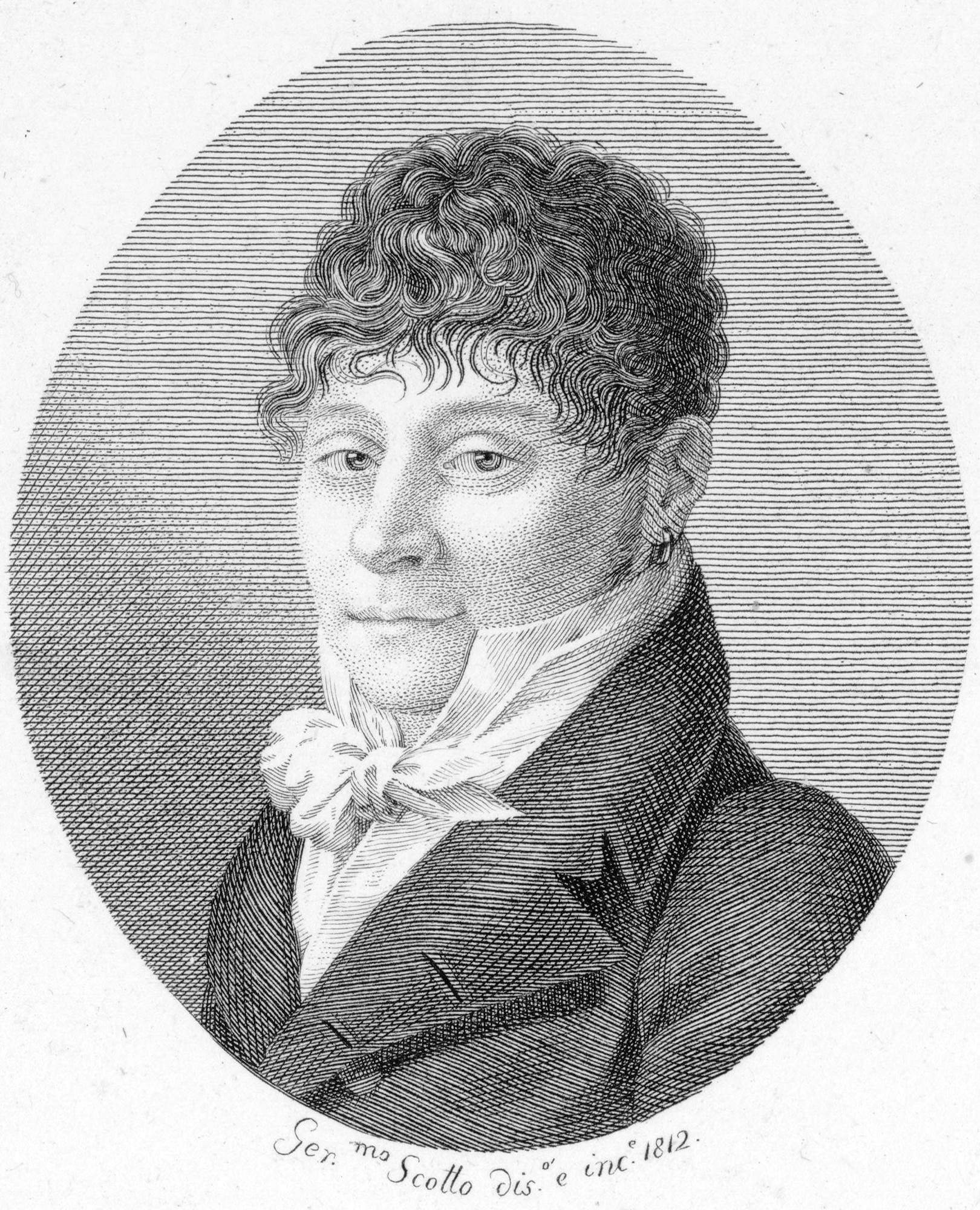
- Generali in a stipple engraving by Luigi Rados
- Born: 23 October 1773; Masserano, Italy
- Died: 3 November 1832 (aged 59); Novara, Italy
- Occupation: Composer

Pietro Generali (born Mercandetti Generali; 23 October 1773 – 3 November 1832) was an Italian composer primarily of operas and vocal music.

Generali was born in Masserano. He studied counterpoint with Giovanni Masi in Rome and spent a few months at the Conservatoire in Naples. After graduation in Rome Generali began composing sacred music. Having produced his first opera in 1800, his first success came with Pamela nubile (Venice, 1804), followed by other farsa, such as Adelina in 1810.

When Rossini began his rise to prominence, Generali moved first to Barcelona, directing the opera company of the Teatre de la Santa Creu (named later the Teatre Principal) and from 1820 conducted and taught in Naples. In his last years, disappointed with the reception of his works, he held the position of Maestro di cappella at Novara Cathedral. He died, aged 59, in Novara.

== Selected works ==
- Pamela nubile (1804)
- Don Chisciotte (1805)
- Le lagrime d'una vedova (1808)
- L'amore prodotto dall'odio (1810)
- Adelina (1810)
- La vedova delirante (1811)
- Chi non risica non rosica (1811)
- La vedova stravagante (1812)
- L'impostore (1815)
- I baccanali di Roma (1816)
- Rodrigo di Valenza (1817)
- Il servo padrone (1818)
- Adelaide di Borgogna (1819)
- Jefte (1823)
- Il divorzio persiano (1828)
- Francesca da Rimini (1829)
- Il romito di Provenza (1831)
