= Giuseppe Gazzaniga =

Italian composer (1743–1818)

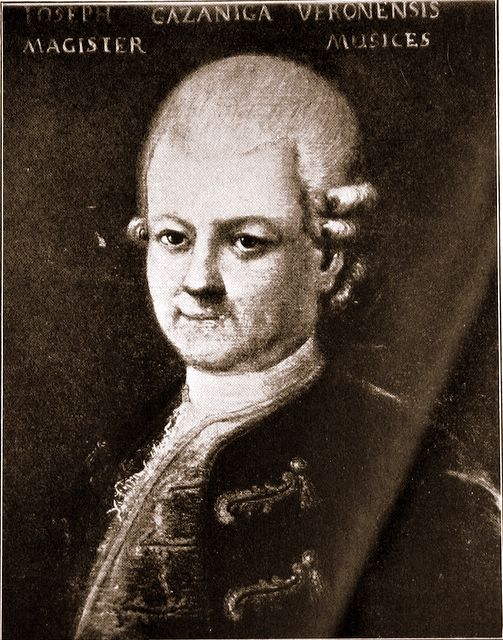
Giuseppe Gazzaniga

Giuseppe Gazzaniga (5 October 1743 – 1 February 1818) was a member of the Neapolitan school of opera composers. He composed fifty-one operas, particularly opera buffa.

== Biography ==
Born in Verona, Gazzaniga was initially intended for the priesthood at the urging of his devout parents. He eventually convinced his father to allow him to pursue a career in music and began studies first in Venice and then at the Conservatorio di Sant'Onofrio a Porta Capuana in Naples. While there, he was a pupil of Niccolò Piccinni and Nicola Porpora. Gazzaniga presented his first opera, Il barone di Trocchia, at the Teatro di San Carlo in 1768. He would spend the next several decades writing mostly operas in Italy with the exception of a few trips to Dresden, Vienna, and Prague. His most successful opera was his Don Giovanni Tenorio written in 1787 to a libretto by Giovanni Bertati, possibly an inspiration for the libretto of Mozart's Don Giovanni. His last opera, Martino Carbonaro, was performed at the Teatro San Moisè in Venice in 1801. He also wrote a symphony and three piano concertos.

In 1791, he became musical director of Crema Cathedral in the Lombardy region of northern Italy, where he composed numerous sacred works including several cantatas, oratorios, and masses. He remained in that position until his death in 1818. His life and works were the subject of a detailed study by the prominent 19th-century German critic Friedrich Chrysander.

== Works ==
=== Operas ===
- Il barone di Trocchia (libretto by Francesco Cerlone, intermezzo, 1768, Naples)
- La locanda (libretto by Giovanni Bertati, opera buffa, 1771, Venice)
- Il Calandrino (libretto by Giovanni Bertati, opera buffa, 1771, Venice)
- Ezio (libretto by Pietro Metastasio, opera seria, 1772, Venice)
- La tomba di Merlino (libretto by Giovanni Bertati, opera buffa 1772, Venice)
- L'isola di Alcina (libretto by Giovanni Bertati, opera buffa, 1772, Venice)
- Zon-Zon (L'inimico delle donne) (libretto by Giovanni Bertati, opera buffa, 1773, Milan)
- Armida (opera seria, 1773, Rome)
- Il matrimonio per inganno (opera buffa, 1773, Pavia)
- Il ciarlatano in fiera (libretto by Pietro Chiari, opera buffa, 1774, Venice)
- Perseo ed Andromeda (libretto by Vittorio Amedeo Cigna-Santi, 1775, opera seria, Florence)
- L'isola di Calipso (libretto by Giovanni Pindemonte, opera seria, 1775, Verona)
- Il re di Mamalucchi (opera buffa, 1775, Prague)
- Gli errori di Telemaco (libretto by Carlo Giuseppe Lanfranchi-Rossi, opera seria, 1776, Pisa)
- La bizzaria degli umori (opera buffa, 1777, Bologna)
- Il marchese di Verde Antico (composto in collaborazione con Francesco Piticchio, opera buffa, 1778, Rome)
- La vendemmia (libretto by Giovanni Bertati, opera buffa, 1778, Florence)
- Il re dei pazzi (opera buffa, 1778, Venice)
- La finta folletto o Lo spirito folletto (opera buffa, 1778, Rome)
- Il disertore (Il disertor francese) (libretto by Ferdinando Casoni, 1779, Florence)
- Antigono (libretto by Pietro Metastasio, opera seria, 1779, Rome)
- Il ritorno di Ulisse e Penelope (libretto by Giovanni Andrea Monigalia, opera seria, 1779, Rome)
- La viaggiatrice (libretto by Francesco Saverio Zini, opera buffa, 1780, Naples)
- Antigona (libretto by Gaetano Roccaforte, opera seria, 1781, Naples)
- La stravagante (libretto by Francesco Saverio Zini, opera buffa, 1781, Naples)
- Amor per oro (libretto by Cerilo Arcomeno, opera buffa, 1782, Venice)
- La creduta infedele (libretto by Francesco Cerlone, opera buffa, 1783, Venice)
- L'intrigo delle mogli (libretto by Giuseppe Palomba, opera buffa, 1783, Naples)
- La dama contadina (opera buffa, 1784, Rome)
- Il serraglio di Osmano o le tre sultane (libretto by Giovanni Bertati, opera buffa, 1784, Venice)
- Tulio Ostilio (libretto by Francesco Ballani, opera seria, 1784, Rome)
- La moglie capricciosa (opera buffa, 1785, Venice)
- Il finto cieco (libretto by Lorenzo Da Ponte opera buffa, 1786, Vienna)
- Circe (libretto by Domenico Perelli, opera seria, 1786, Venice)
- La contessa di Novaluna (libretto by Giovanni Bertati, opera buffa, 1786, Venice)
- Le donne fanatiche (libretto by Giovanni Bertati, 1786, Venice)
- Don Giovanni Tenorio (libretto by Giovanni Bertati, dramma giocoso, 1787, Venice)
- La Didone (opera seria, 1787, Venice)
- La cameriera di spirito (libretto by Gaetano Fiorio, opera buffa, 1787, Venice)
- L'amore costante (La costanza in amor rende felice) (libretto by Giovanni Bertati, opera buffa, 1787, Venice)
- Erifile (opera seria, 1789, Venice)
- Gli Argonauti in Colco (libretto by Antonio Simeone Sografi, opera seria, 1790, Venice)
- Idomeneo (libretto by Gaetano Sentor, opera seria, 1790, Padua)
- La disfatta dei Mori (libretto by Giandomenico Boggio, opera seria, 1791, Turin)
- La dama soldato (libretto by Caterino Mazzolà, opera buffa, 1792, Venice)
- La pastorella nobile (opera buffa, 1793, Fortezza di Palma)
- La donna astuta (opera buffa, 1793, Venice)
- Il divorzio senza matrimonio ossia La donna che non parla (libretto by Gaetano Sentor, opera buffa, 1794, Modena)
- Fedeltà e amore alla pruova (libretto by Giuseppe Foppa, 1798, Venice)
- Il marito migliore (libretto by Tomaso Menucci di Goro, opera buffa, 1801, Milan)
- Martino Carbonaro o sia Gli sposi fuggitivi (libretto by Giuseppe Foppa, farsa, 1801, Venice)

=== Selected sacred music ===
- San Mauro Abate (oratorio)
- Sansone (oratorio)
- I profeti al calvario (oratorio)
- Missa pro defunctis
- Te Deum laudamus
- Requiem
- Gloria in excelsis Deo
- Kyrie breve
- Credo
- Two different Tamtum ergo
- Stabat Mater (1800)

=== Selected instrumental music ===
- Three piano concertos
- One symphony
