= Lorenzo Da Ponte =

Italian librettist, professor, and Roman Catholic priest (1749–1838)

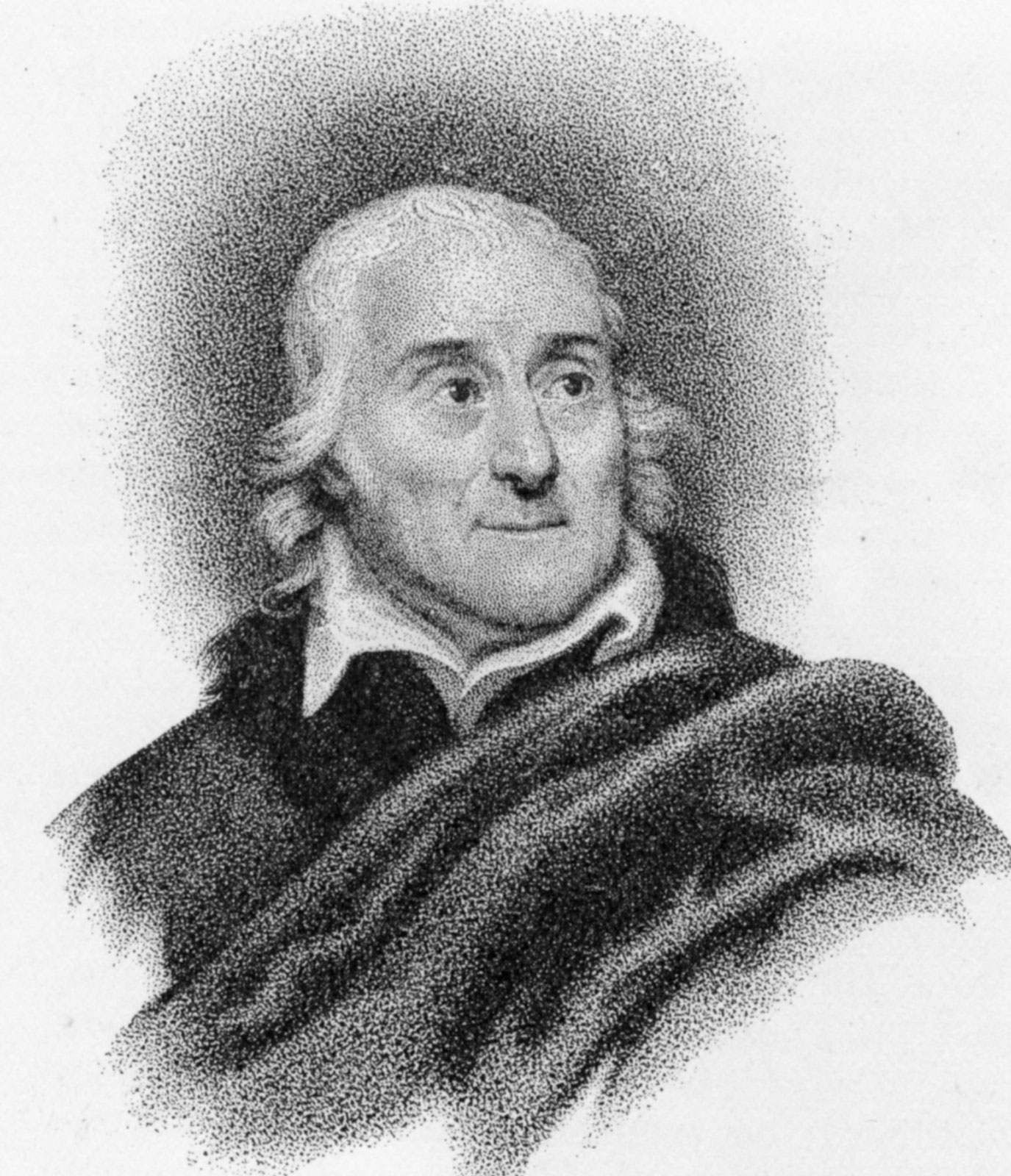
- Lorenzo Da Ponte c. 1822
- Born: Emanuele Conegliano; March 10, 1749; Ceneda, Republic of Venice
- Died: August 17, 1838 (aged 89); New York City, U.S.
- Resting place: Calvary Cemetery (Queens)
- Occupations: librettist; poet; professor; priest
- Years active: 1770–1838
- Partner: Nancy Grahl
- Children: 5
- Father: Geronimo Conegliano

Lorenzo Da Ponte (Note: UK: /dɑː ˈpɒnteɪ/ dah PON-tay, US: /də ˈpɒnti/ də PON-tee, Italian: [loˈrɛntso da (p)ˈponte].) (né Emanuele Conegliano; 10 March 1749 – 17 August 1838) was an Italian and American librettist, poet and Roman Catholic priest. He wrote the libretti for 28 operas by 11 composers, including three of Mozart's most celebrated operas: The Marriage of Figaro (1786), Don Giovanni (1787), and Così fan tutte (1790).

He was the first professor of Italian literature at Columbia University, and with Manuel Garcia, the first to introduce Italian opera to America. Aside from his relationship with Mozart, Da Ponte was also a close friend of Casanova.

== Early career ==
Republic of Venice, birthplace of Lorenzo Da Ponte

Lorenzo Da Ponte was born Emanuele Conegliano in 1749 in Ceneda, in the Republic of Venice (now Vittorio Veneto, Italy). He was Jewish by birth, the eldest of three sons. In 1764, his father, Geronimo Conegliano, then a widower, converted himself and his family to Roman Catholicism in order to marry a Catholic woman. Emanuele, as was the custom, took the name of Lorenzo Da Ponte from the bishop of Ceneda who baptised him.

Thanks to the bishop, the three Conegliano brothers studied at the Ceneda seminary. The bishop died in 1768, after which Lorenzo moved to the seminary at Portogruaro, where he took Minor Orders in 1770 and became Professor of Literature. He was ordained a priest in 1773. He began at this period writing poetry in Italian and Latin, including an ode to wine, "Ditirambo sopra gli odori".

In 1773, Da Ponte moved to Venice, where he made a living as a teacher of Latin, Italian and French. Although he was a Catholic priest, the young man led a dissolute life. While priest of the Church of San Luca, he took a mistress, with whom he had two children. In 1777, he met Giacomo Casanova, who became a close friend for over 20 years and was featured in his memoirs. Both were Venetian adventurers, kindred spirits, and seducers.

At Da Ponte's 1779 trial, where he was charged with "public concubinage" and "abduction of a respectable woman", it was alleged that he had been living in a brothel and organizing the entertainments there. He was found guilty and banished for fifteen years from Venice.

== Vienna and London ==
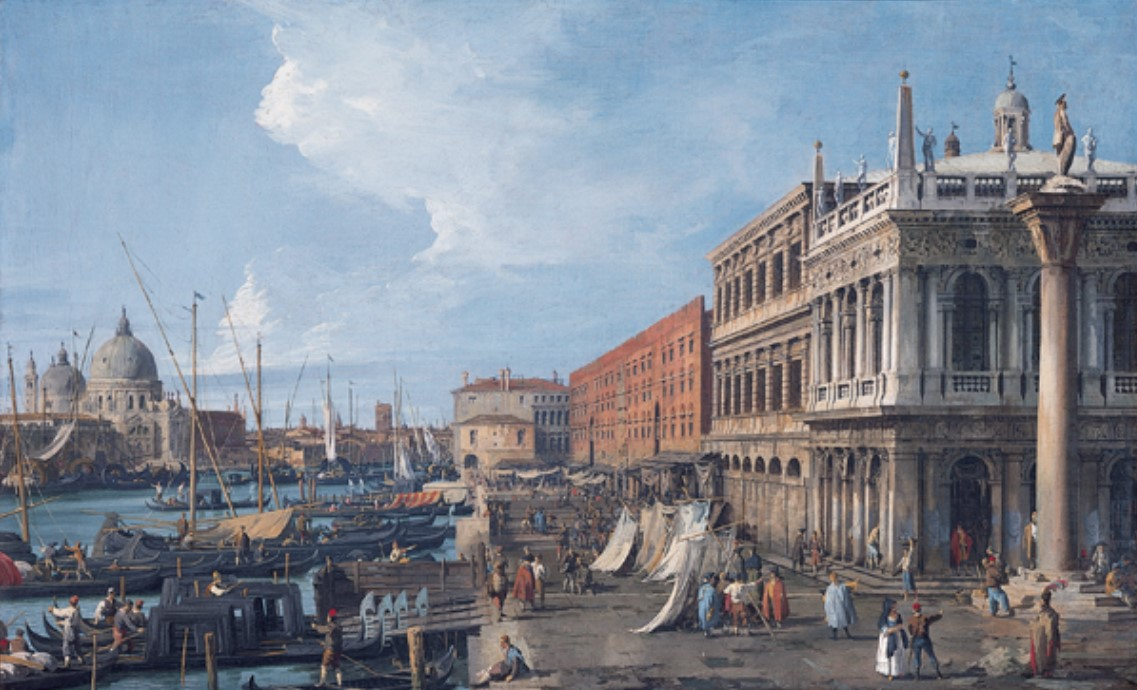
Painting of Venice, Italy, circa 1735, by artist Canaletto

Da Ponte moved to Gorizia (Görz), then part of Austria, where he lived as a writer, attaching himself to the leading noblemen and cultural patrons of the city. In 1781, he believed (falsely) that he had an invitation from his friend Caterino Mazzolà, the poet of the Saxon court, to take up a post at Dresden, only to be disabused when he arrived there. Mazzolà however offered him work at the theatre translating libretti and recommended that he seek to develop writing skills. He also gave him a letter of introduction to the composer Antonio Salieri. In 1784, he met his friend Casanova once again in Vienna, and with his newly made fortune, financed him and received his counsels.

With the help of Salieri, Da Ponte applied for and obtained the post of librettist to the Italian Theatre in Vienna. Here he also found a patron in the banker Raimund Wetzlar von Plankenstern, benefactor of Wolfgang Amadeus Mozart whom he would meet in 1783. As court poet and librettist in Vienna, he collaborated with Mozart, Salieri and Vicente Martín y Soler.

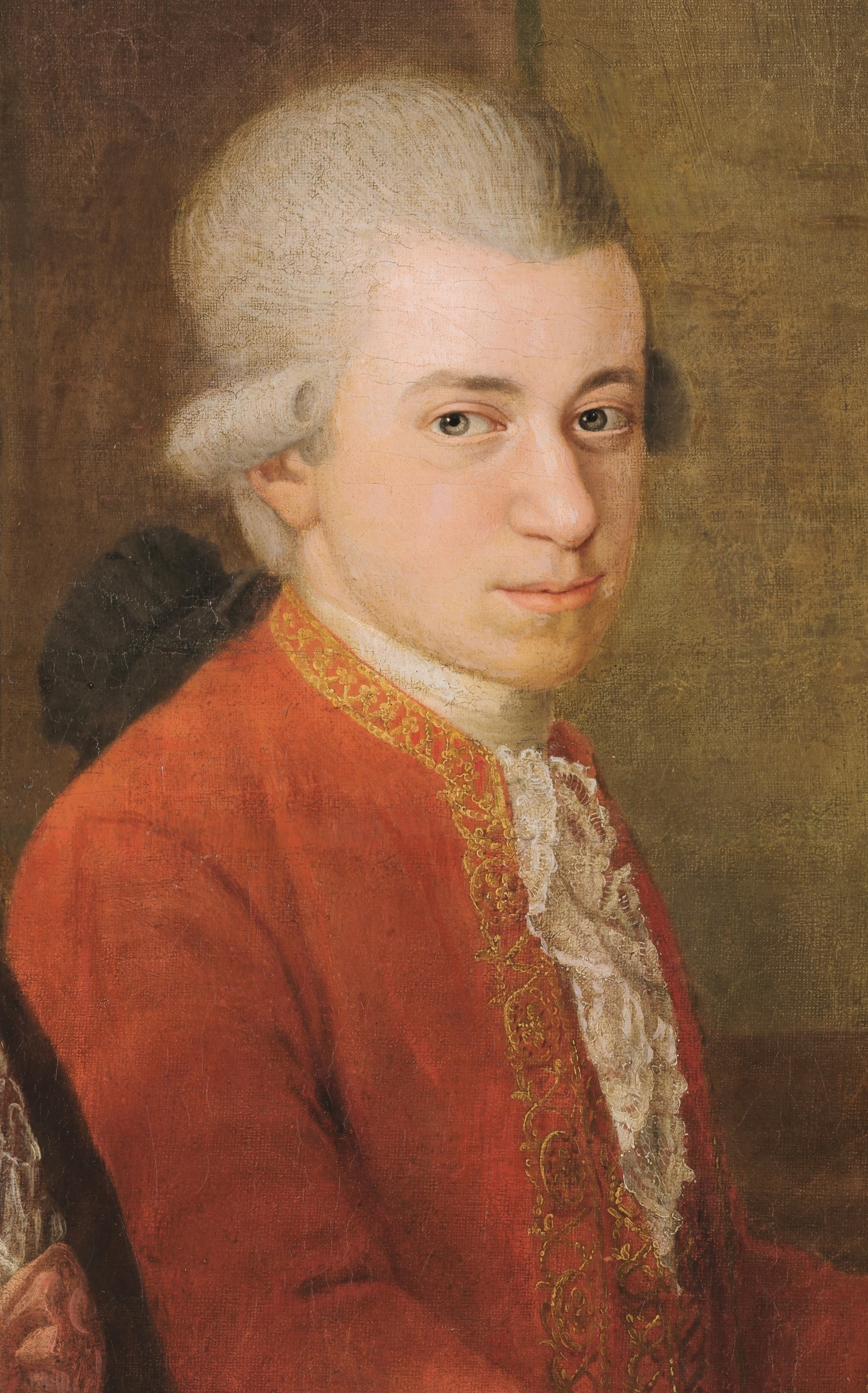
Mozart's portrait. Da Ponte wrote numbers of his libretti, including 1786 comedy opera The Marriage of Figaro.

Da Ponte wrote the libretti for Mozart's most popular Italian operas, The Marriage of Figaro (1786), Don Giovanni (1787), and Così fan tutte (1790), and Soler's Una cosa rara, as well as the text on which the cantata Per la ricuperata salute di Ofelia (collaboratively composed in 1785 by Salieri, Mozart and Cornetti) is based. All of Da Ponte's works were adaptations of pre-existing plots, as was common among librettists of the time, with the exceptions of L'arbore di Diana with Soler, and Così fan tutte, which he began with Salieri, but completed with Mozart. However the quality of his elaboration gave them new life.

In the case of Figaro, Da Ponte included a preface to the libretto that hints at his technique and objectives in libretto writing, as well as his close working with the composer:

I have not made a translation [of Beaumarchais], but rather an imitation, or let us say an extract. ... I was compelled to reduce the sixteen original characters to eleven, two of which can be played by a single actor and to omit, in addition to one whole act, many effective scenes. ... In spite, however, of all the zeal and care on the part of both the composer and myself to be brief, the opera will not be one of the shortest. ... Our excuse will be the variety of development of this drama, ... to paint faithfully and in full colour the divers passions that are aroused, and ... to offer a new type of spectacle. ...

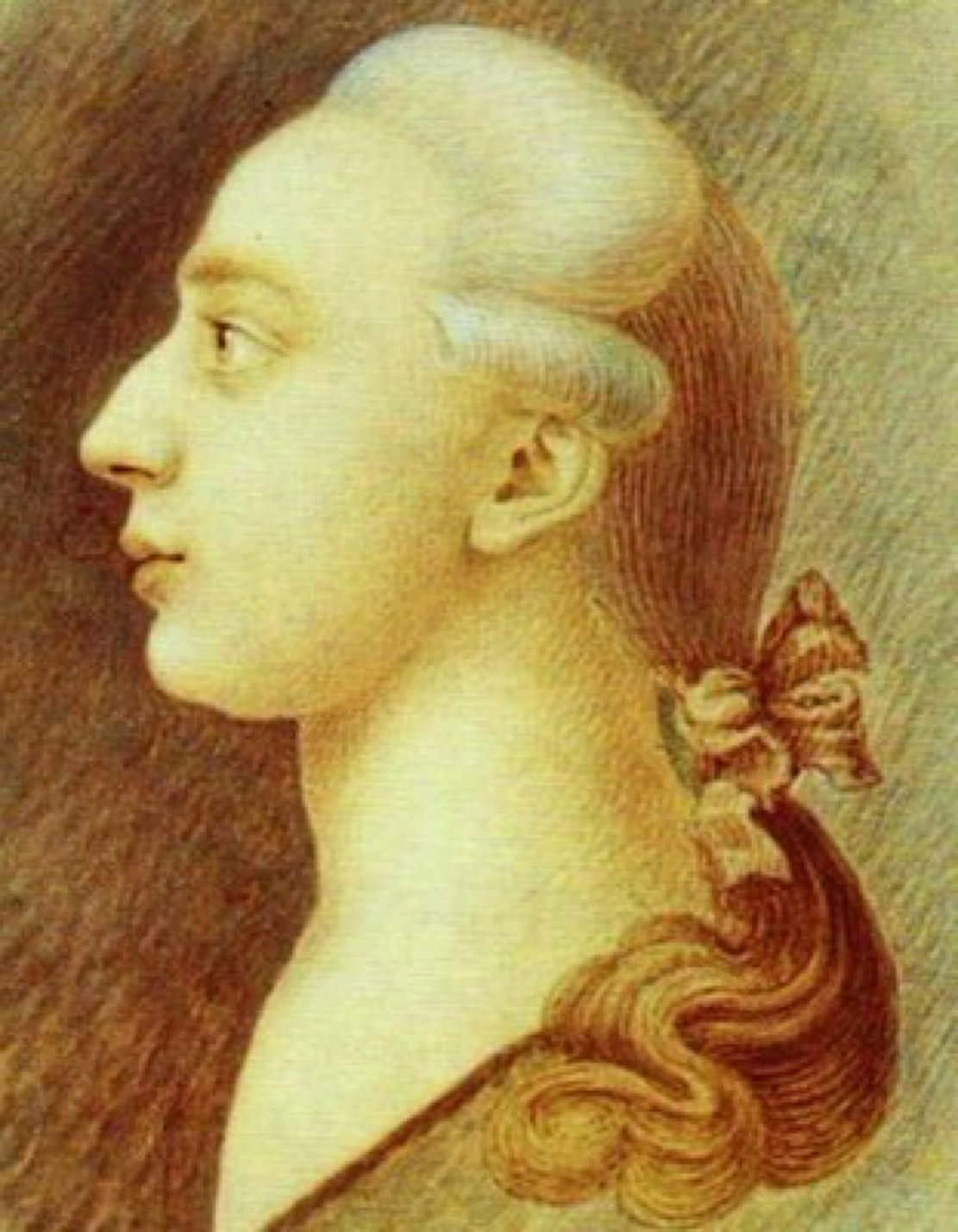
Casanova's portrait. Casanova was placed under arrest and is featured in Da Ponte's memoirs.

Only one address of Da Ponte's during his stay in Vienna is known: in 1788 he lived in the house Heidenschuß 316 (today the street area between Freyung and Hof), which belonged to the Viennese archbishop. There he rented a three-room apartment for 200 Gulden.

With the death of Austrian Emperor Joseph II, brother of Marie-Antoinette, in 1790, Da Ponte lost his patron and position as court theater poet. He was formally dismissed from the Imperial Service in 1791, due to intrigues, receiving no support from the new Emperor, Leopold. At this time, he was still banished from Venice (until the end of 1794), so he would travel elsewhere. In Trieste he met Nancy Grahl, the English daughter of a Jewish chemist (whom he would never marry but with whom he eventually would have four children).

In August 1792, he set off for Paris via Prague and Dresden armed with a letter of recommendation to Queen Marie Antoinette that her brother, the late Emperor Joseph II, had given Da Ponte before his death. On the road to Paris, on learning about the worsening political situation in France and the arrest of the king and queen, he decided to head for London instead, accompanied by his companion Grahl and their then two children.

During this time, he met for the last time Casanova in Vienna, looking for his old friend to settle a debt but after seeing Casanova's poor situation, he decided to not recall the debt. Casanova still accompanied him on his way to Dresden while he was serving as Secretary to Count Waldstein, the patron of Ludwig van Beethoven, and advised him to not go to Paris but London.

Da Ponte would later comment in his memoirs on Casanova's arrest at the Piombi prison in the Doge's Palace in Venice. After a precarious start in England, exercising a number of jobs including that of grocer and Italian teacher, he became librettist at the King's Theatre, London, in 1803. He remained based in London, undertaking various theatrical and publishing activities until 1805, when debt and bankruptcy caused him to flee to the United States with Grahl and their children.

== American career (1805–1838) ==
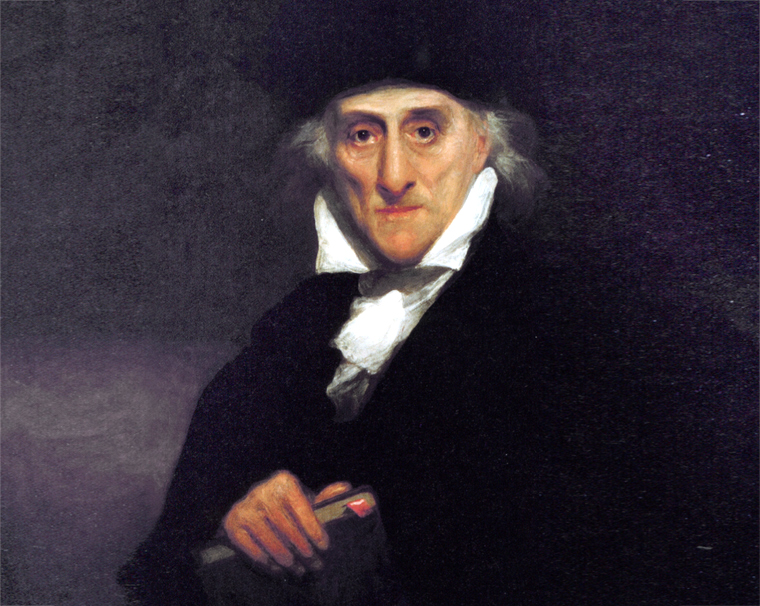
Portrait by Samuel Morse, Lorenzo Da Ponte, at the New York Yacht Club

Having moved to the United States in 1805, Da Ponte settled in New York City first, then Sunbury, Pennsylvania, where he briefly ran a grocery store and gave private Italian lessons while entertaining in some business activities in Philadelphia. He returned to New York to open a bookstore. He became friends with Clement Clarke Moore, and, through him, gained an unpaid appointment as the first professor of Italian literature at Columbia College.

He was the first Roman Catholic priest to be appointed to the faculty, and he was also the first to have been raised a Jew. In New York he introduced opera and produced in May 1826 the first full performance of Don Giovanni in the United States, in which Maria García (soon to marry Malibran) sang Zerlina. He also introduced Gioachino Rossini's music in the U.S., through a concert tour with his niece Giulia Da Ponte.

In 1807 he began to write his Memoirs (published in 1823), described by Charles Rosen as "not an intimate exploration of his own identity and character, but rather a picaresque adventure story." In 1828, at the age of 79, Da Ponte became a naturalized U.S. citizen.

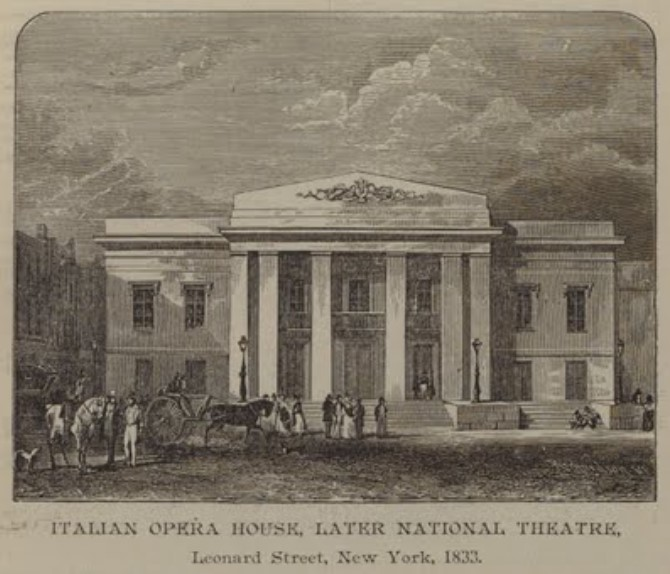
The Italian Opera House, New-York, Lorenzo Da Ponte company

In 1833, at the age of eighty-four, he founded the first purpose-built opera theater in the United States, the Italian Opera House in New York City, on the northwest corner of Leonard and Church Streets, which was far superior to any theater the city had yet seen. Owing to his lack of business acumen, however, it lasted only two seasons before the company had to be disbanded and the theater sold to pay the company's debts. In 1836 the opera house became the National Theater. In 1839 the building was burned to the ground, but it was speedily rebuilt and reopened. On 29 May 1841 however, it was destroyed by fire again. Da Ponte's opera house was, however, the predecessor of the New York Academy of Music and of the New York Metropolitan Opera.

Da Ponte died in 1838 in New York; an enormous funeral ceremony was held in New York's old St. Patrick's Cathedral on Mulberry Street. Records indicate that he was originally buried in a Catholic Cemetery on 11th Street between First Avenue and Avenue A. That cemetery was later paved over and the remains of the people buried there were removed to Calvary Cemetery in 1909. While the exact location of his grave at Calvary is unknown, Calvary Cemetery does contain a stone marker as a memorial.

In 2009 the Spanish director Carlos Saura released his Italian film Io, Don Giovanni, a somewhat fictionalized account of Da Ponte, which attempted to link his life with his libretto for Don Giovanni.

== Da Ponte's libretti ==
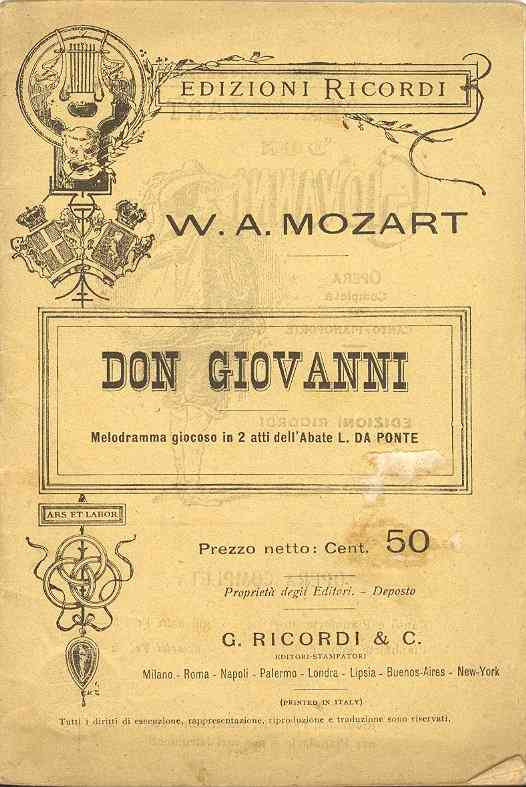
Libretto Don Giovanni, melodrama by Da Ponte and Mozart

The nature of Da Ponte's contribution to the art of libretto-writing has been much discussed. In The New Grove Dictionary of Music and Musicians, it is pointed out that "the portrayal of grand passions was not his strength", but that he worked particularly closely with his composers to bring out their strengths, especially where it was a matter of sharp characterization or humorous or satirical passages.

Richard Taruskin notes that Mozart, in letters to his father Leopold, had expressed concern to secure Da Ponte, but was worried that the Italian composers in town (e.g. Salieri) were trying to keep him for themselves.

He specifically wished to create a buffa comedy opera which included a seria female part for contrast; Taruskin suggests that "Da Ponte's special gift was that of forging this virtual smorgasbord of idioms into a vivid dramatic shape." David Cairns examines Da Ponte's reworking of the scenario for Don Giovanni, (originally written by Giovanni Bertati and performed in Venice as Don Giovanni Tenorio, with music by Gazzaniga, in 1787).

Cairns points out that "the verbal borrowings are few", and that Da Ponte is at every point "wittier, more stylish, more concise and more effective." Moreover, Da Ponte's restructuring of the action enables a tighter format giving better opportunities for Mozart's musical structures. David Conway suggests that Da Ponte's own life 'in disguise' (as a Jew/priest/womaniser) enabled him to infuse the operatic cliche of disguise with a sense of Romantic irony.

== Family ==
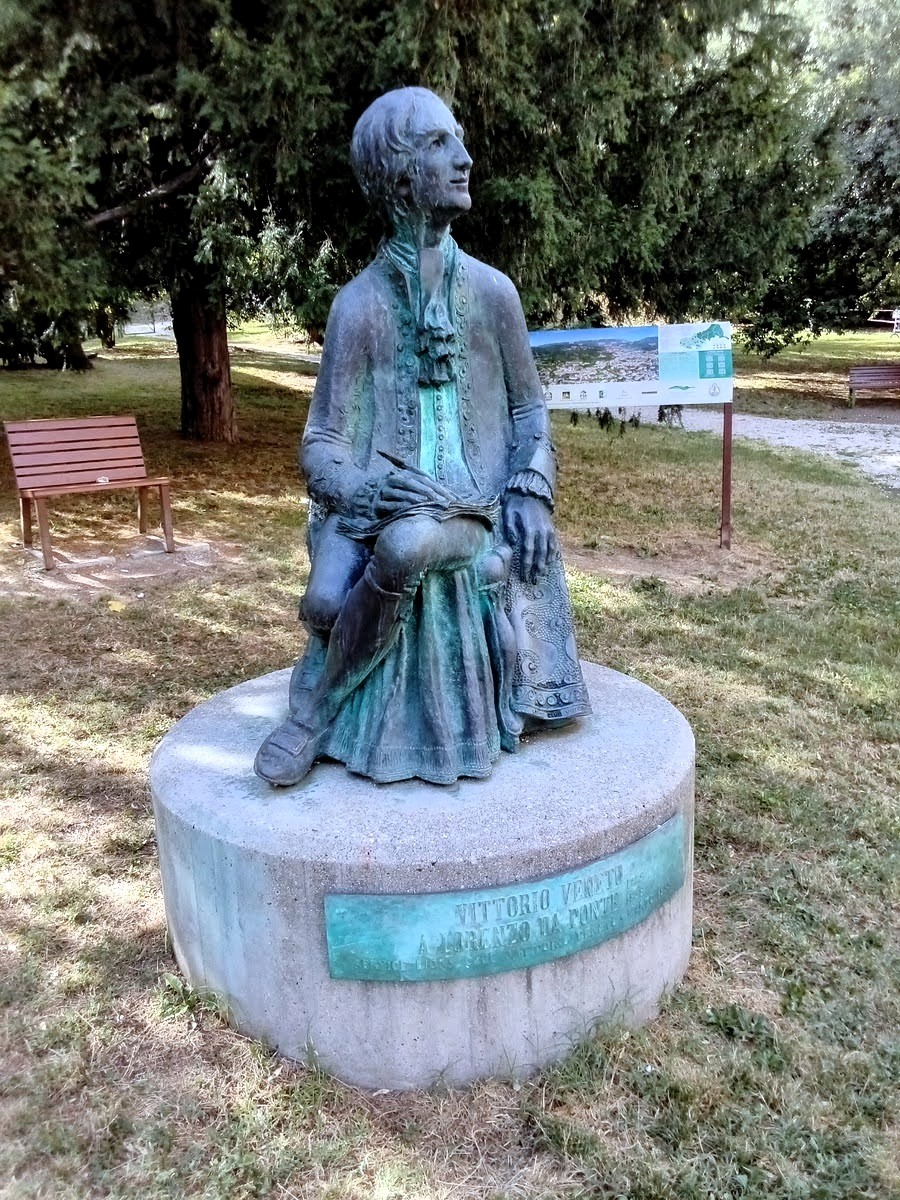
Da Ponte's statue at Papadopoli park, Vittorio Veneto

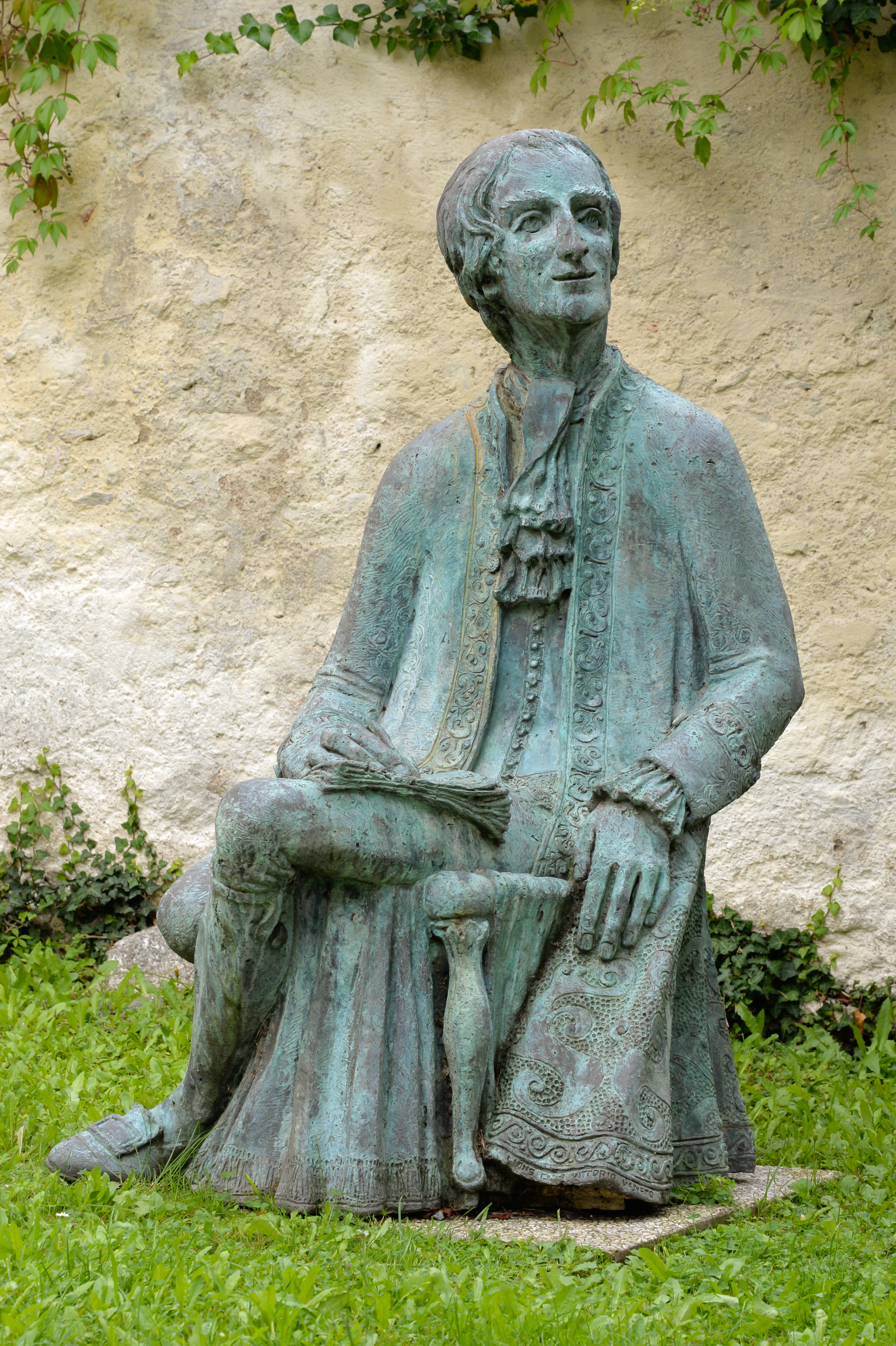
Da Ponte's statue, Millstätter See, Austria

With Nancy Grahl he had five children :

- Louisa (Da Ponte) Clossey (1798–1823)
- Frances (Da Ponte) Anderson (1799–1844)
- Joseph Da Ponte (1800–1821)
- Lorenzo Luigi Da Ponte (1804–1840)
- Charles Grahl Da Ponte (b. 1806)

Frances Da Ponte married Knight commander Henry James Anderson. Their son, Maj. Elbert Ellery Anderson (1833–1903), married to Augusta Chauncey (b. 1835), granddaughter of Commodore Isaac Chauncey, and descendant of Charles Chauncy, the 2nd President of Harvard. Maj. Ellery Anderson was of the family of Founding father William Ellery, and his cousin Elbert Jefferson Anderson, was a millionaire in 1892.

Their son, Peter Chauncey Anderson, was married to Mary Yale Ogden, who was the daughter of Elias Hudson Ogden and Martha Louise Goodrich. Her grandparents were Dr. Oren Goodrich and Olivia Yale, daughter of Colonel Braddam Yale, members of the Yale and Ogden families. She was a distant relative of Edith Ogden, (the wife of Carter Harrison IV –himself a mayor of Chicago and a cousin of US President William Henry Harrison) and of Senator Aaron Ogden (governor of New Jersey).

== Works ==
- Opera libretti:
  - Il ricco d'un giorno (1784) – composer Antonio Salieri
  - Il burbero di buon cuore (1786, from the comedy Le bourru bienfaisant by Carlo Goldoni) – composer Vicente Martín y Soler
  - Il finto cieco (1786, from the comedy L'Aveugle clairvoyant by Marc-Antoine Legrand) – composer Giuseppe Gazzaniga
  - Le nozze di Figaro (1786, from the comedy The Marriage of Figaro by Pierre Beaumarchais) – composer Wolfgang Amadeus Mozart
  - Il Demogorgone ovvero Il filosofo confuso (1786, from the comedy Il filosofo punito by Pietro Antonio Zaguri) – composer Vincenzo Righini
  - Una cosa rara o sia Bellezza ed onestà (1786, from the play La Luna de la Sierra by Luis Vélez de Guevara) – composer Vicente Martín y Soler
  - Gli equivoci (1786, from The Comedy of Errors by William Shakespeare) – composer Stephen Storace
  - Il Bertoldo (1787, from the story Le sottilissime astutie di Bertoldo by Giulio Cesare Croce) – composer Francesco Piticchio
  - L'arbore di Diana (1787) – composer Vicente Martín y Soler
  - Il dissoluto punito o sia Il Don Giovanni (1787, loosely based on the libretto Don Giovanni Tenorio by Giovanni Bertati) – composer Wolfgang Amadeus Mozart
  - Axur, re d'Ormus (1788, translation of the libretto Tarare by Pierre Beaumarchais) – composer Antonio Salieri
  - Il pastor fido (1789, from the tragicomedy Il pastor fido by Giovanni Battista Guarini) – composer Antonio Salieri
  - L'ape musicale (1789) – pasticcio of works by various composers
  - La cifra (1789, from the libretto La dama pastorella attributed to Giuseppe Petrosellini) – composer Antonio Salieri
  - Così fan tutte o sia La scola degli amanti (1790) – composer Wolfgang Amadeus Mozart
  - La caffettiera bizzarra (1790, loosely based on the comedy The Mistress of the Inn by Carlo Goldoni) – composer Joseph Weigl
  - La scola de' maritati (1795, also known as La capricciosa corretta, from the comedy La moglie in calzoni by Jacopo Angelo Nelli) – composer Vicente Martín y Soler
  - L'isola del piacere (1795) – composer Vicente Martín y Soler
  - Il tesoro (1796) – composer Joseph Mazzinghi
  - Il consiglio imprudente (1796, from the comedy Un curioso accidente by Carlo Goldoni) – composer Francesco Bianchi
  - Merope (1797) – composer Francesco Bianchi
  - Armida (1802) – composer Francesco Bianchi
  - La grotta di Calipso (1803) – composer Peter Winter
  - Il trionfo dell'amor fraterno (1804) – composer Peter Winter
  - Il ratto di Proserpina (1804) – composer Peter Winter
- Cantatas and oratorios:
  - Per la ricuperata salute di Ofelia (1785) – composers Wolfgang Amadeus Mozart, Antonio Salieri and "Cornetti"
  - Il Davidde (1791) – Pasticcio from works by various composers
  - Hymn to America – composer Antonio Bagioli
- Poetry:
  - Letter of complaint in blank verse to Leopold II, Holy Roman Emperor
  - 18 sonnets in commemoration of his wife (1832)
- Other
  - translations from English into Italian
  - several books of elementary instruction in the Italian language
  - Memorie (autobiography)

== See also ==
- Teresa Bagioli Sickles

== Sources ==
- Angermüller, Rudolph (1990). "Da Ponte, Lorenzo". In Stanley Sadie (ed.). The New Grove Dictionary of Music and Musicians. London: Macmillan. ISBN 0333231112.
- Dumazet de Pontigny, Victor (1900). "Ponte, Lorenzo da" . A Dictionary of Music and Musicians. Vol. 3. p. 15.
- Cairns, David (2006). Mozart and his Operas. London: Penguin. ISBN 9780713994919.
- Conway, David (2012). Jewry in Music: Entry to the Profession from the Enlightenment to Richard Wagner. Cambridge: Cambridge University Press. ISBN 9781107015388.
- Da Ponte, Lorenzo (2000). A. Livingstone (ed.). Memoirs. Translated by E. Abbott. Introduction Charles Rosen. New York: New York Review of Books. ISBN 9780940322356.
- Einstein, Alfred (1962). Mozart: His Character, His Work. Translated by A. Mendel and N. Broder. Oxford: Oxford University Press. ISBN 0195007328.
- Holden, Anthony (2006). The Man Who Wrote Mozart: The Extraordinary Life of Lorenzo Da Ponte. London: Orion Publishing. ISBN 0-7538-2180-X.
- Taruskin, Richard (2010). Music in the Seventeenth and Eighteenth Centuries. Oxford: Oxford University Press. ISBN 9780195384826.
