= COVID-19 pandemic in popular culture =

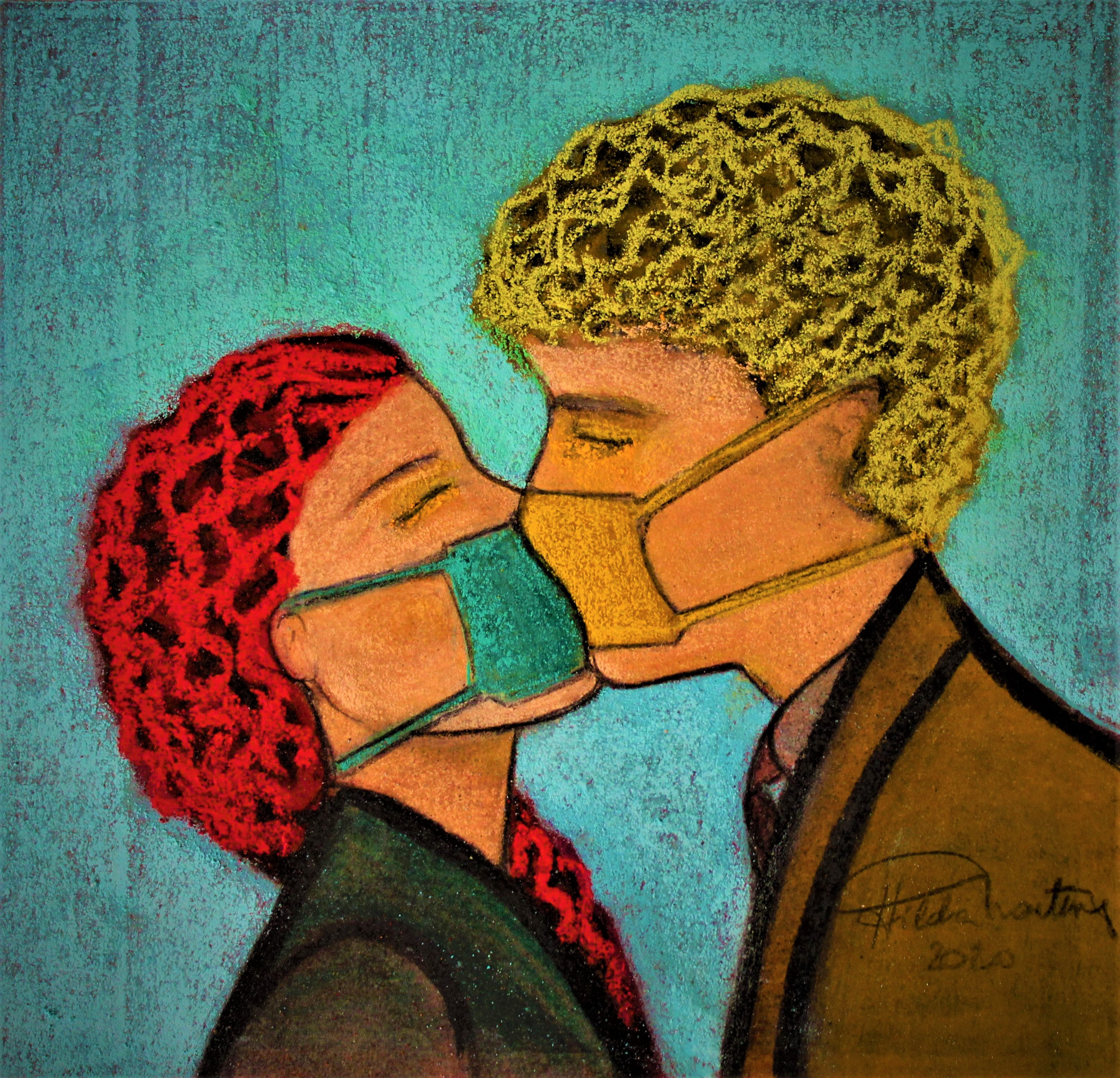
"Afectos en pandemia," by Hilda Chaulo

The COVID-19 pandemic swept the world in the early months of 2020, causing massive economic and social disruption. In addition to the disease itself, populations have often dealt with lockdowns, shortages and pandemic fatigue, political and cultural turmoil. This made the pandemic a time of exceptional stress, driving some people to seek peaceful escapism in media and others to consume media concerning fictional pandemics (i.e., zombie apocalypses) in an effort to make sense of the event. Themes include contagion, isolation and loss of control. The pandemic also impacted people's use of social media as well as the sports industry.

Some commentators have referred to the pandemic as a "distinct cultural era".

== In media ==
The pandemic has been included in the narratives of ongoing pre-pandemic television series and become a central narrative in new ones, with mixed results.

=== Film and television ===
"It was inevitable that films would be made about this significant chapter in global history, in part because a small group of people enduring an extended stay in their own homes is about the only scenario it's safe and logistically possible to actually shoot right now. But did the results have to start arriving while we're all still stuck in this nightmare?"
A. A. Dowd, The A.V. Club

==== Horror ====
The horror film Host (2020), a computer screen film, was produced and released during the pandemic and centers on characters attacked by a supernatural presence after conducting a seance via Zoom.

Another film, Safer at Home, filmed in 2021 and set in 2022, envisions Los Angeles as a police state as a result of the pandemic. It depicts an online party going "terribly wrong."

The slasher film Sick is set during the pandemic.

==== Comedy ====
Staged is a British television comedy series set during the COVID-19 pandemic in the United Kingdom. It was primarily filmed using video-conferencing technology. In the first series, released in June 2020, David Tennant and Michael Sheen play fictionalized versions of themselves, trying to rehearse a play online during lockdown.

The film Borat Subsequent Moviefilm, a sequel to the 2006 mockumentary film Borat, was released on Amazon Prime Video in October 2020. It features the fictional Kazakh journalist Borat Sagdiyev (Sacha Baron Cohen) traveling around the United States and interacting with Americans during the pandemic. The film's conclusion jokingly postulates that COVID-19 was created by the Kazakhstan government, which used Borat to spread it and start the pandemic.

Hemet, or the Landlady Don't Drink Tea is a dystopian dark comedy distributed by BayView Entertainment about a vile landlady who wreaks havoc on her tenants during a zombie epidemic. The screenwriter Brian Patrick Butler was inspired by political division that stemmed from the pandemic.

Writing for The New York Times about the then-upcoming BBC sitcom Pandemonium on 16 December 2020, David Segal asked, "Are we ready to laugh about Covid-19? Or rather, is there anything amusing, or recognizable in a humorous way, about life during a plague, with all of its indignities and setbacks, not to mention its rituals (clapping for health care workers) and rules (face masks, please)."

The film Locked Down, about a jewelry heist during the pandemic, was released on HBO Max on 14 January 2021, after being filmed in September 2020 and set the previous spring. It received mixed reviews.

Bo Burnham: Inside is a Netflix comedy special released in May 2021 and filmed during the pandemic without a crew or audience, with Burnham directing, shooting and editing the special while quarantined. It features themes of balancing the impulses to "stay in bed, stay in the dark, stay alone", and "to create, create, create, stay busy, and make jokes", as well as thoughts on the irrelevance of one's own work during a perceived global collapse.

The satirical American TV cartoon South Park did two double-length episodes about COVID-19, "The Pandemic Special" and "South ParQ Vaccination Special". It then did two approximately hour-long television films, South Park: Post Covid, and South Park: Post Covid: The Return of Covid.

Friend of the World is a COVID satire and body horror film distributed by Troma Entertainment. Similar to The Divine Comedy, The Twilight Zone, and Night of the Living Dead, it was "deeply embedding some of the concerns of civil unrest people were facing at the time with the story of a disturbed man in an underground bunker."

==== Drama/thriller ====
The Gone Game is an Indian psychological thriller web series directed by Nikhil Bhat, shot almost entirely within the confines of homes and directed remotely during the COVID-19 pandemic in India. It premiered on Voot on 20 August 2020. The show follows the death of a COVID-19 patient with the plotline getting messier in each episode.

The U.S. medical drama television series The Good Doctor and Grey's Anatomy began airing their season 4 and season 17, respectively, in November 2020. Both featured COVID-19's impact on the characters working at, and patients of, the hospital where the shows are set – including recurring characters becoming infected by the disease.

The U.S. drama franchise One Chicago premiered on 11 November 2020, with Chicago Med featuring a COVID Unit in the hospital, where incoming patients were tested by paramedics in season 6.

The U.S. procedural drama television series 9-1-1 began airing its season 4 in January 2021. The opening episode number 47, "The New Abnormal" featured a storyline centered around the COVID-19 pandemic and its impacts on both the recurring characters and everyday individuals.

Songbird, an American dystopian romantic thriller film directed by Adam Mason and produced by Michael Bay, in which "COVID-23" has caused the world to remain in lockdown for four years, filmed in Los Angeles during the real-world pandemic with consequently disrupted-production. The initial response was negative, with critics arguing that it was "cashing in on human suffering" and "throwing nightmare fuel on the fire of conspiracy theorists." It is described as the first American film derived entirely from the pandemic, was released on 11 December 2020, to generally negative reviews. At least eight of the 75 movies announced for the 2021 South by Southwest included COVID-19 in their narratives.

Putham Pudhu Kaalai (transl. A brand new dawn) is a 2020 Indian Tamil-language anthology film, consisting of five short film segments. It was entirely shot during the COVID-19 pandemic in India and is set against the backdrop of the country's 21-day lockdown in March 2020, the five short films talk about hope, love, and new beginnings during the pandemic. The film released on Amazon Prime Video on 16 October 2020.

Karthik Dial Seytha Yenn (transl. The number dialled by Karthik) is a 2020 Indian Tamil-language short film written and directed by Gautham Vasudev Menon. A sequel to his Vinnaithaandi Varuvaayaa (2010), it stars Silambarasan and Trisha reprising their roles from that film. The film was primarily shot using an iPhone and released on 20 May 2020 on YouTube. It follows filmmaker Karthik who is at home during the COVID-19 pandemic in Tamil Nadu without work as theatres are shut down, affecting his career as a screenwriter. While experiencing writer's block, he hesitantly calls his ex-girlfriend Jessie, who fled the effects of the pandemic in New York City and is under lockdown in Kerala. After the phone call, Karthik resumes his writing and composes Kamal & Kadambari – A Love Story.

Coronavirus is an Indian Telugu-language film that explores life of a middle-class family amidst COVID-19 lockdown in India. The film was released on 11 December 2020.

Operation MBBS Season 2 is an Indian Hindi-language medical drama set in the COVID-19 pandemic in a medical college which is under the impact of the pandemic. Directed by Amrit Raj Gupta, the series was released on Dice Media YouTube channel, with its first episode uploaded on 15 March 2021.

Eeswaran is a 2021 Indian Tamil-language action-drama film written and directed by Suseenthiran. It tells the story of a familial dispute during and due to the COVID-19 pandemic in India.

A Pencil to the Jugular is a 2021 Australian drama directed by Matthew Victor Pastor. Set during the COVID-19 lockdowns in Melbourne it is the second instalment in a 2020 trilogy of feature films directed by Matthew Victor Pastor. The film premiered at the 43rd Moscow International Film Festival in April 2021.

On 13 March 2025 it was aired 7291, which is focused on the casualties in Madrid and it also includes commentaries about family victims, doctors and responsible of the residence for the elderly.

In May 2025, A24 released the Ari Aster film Eddington, which largely focused on the effects of the COVID-19 pandemic and the George Floyd protests on US political culture. Several critics have noted that Eddington uses the Western genre to explore contemporary American political divisions, conspiracy theories, and pandemic-era paranoia. David Ehrlich of IndieWire described it as "a bleak and brilliant look at post-COVID America."

Season 3 of The Family Man is set during the COVID-19 lockdowns. The series is an Indian espionage thriller created by Raj Nidimoru and Krishna D.K. It follows the story of Project Guan-Yu, planned by Chinese terrorists during the pandemic to strike over India. This was hinted at in the post-credit scene of the second season's final episode. Season 3 is set to be released on 21 November 2025.

In season 1 of The Pitt, an American medical drama that debuted in 2025, the protagonist Dr. Robby is shown to suffer flashbacks of treating patients during the pandemic and losing his mentor to COVID-19.

==== Short film ====
Pablo Larrain coordinated a short film anthology entitled Homemade, created during—and featuring stories about—the COVID-19 lockdown period. Each of the 17 directors were asked to produce a five- to seven-minute-long film, using only equipment found at home, and for a general audience. The project was conceived in March and released only three months later in June, via Netflix.

Gotta Get Some Tissue! is an animated short film and music video inspired by the pandemic, released in 2021.

The Last Butterflies with Cooper Andrews and Whitney Wegman-Wood was inspired by Wegman-Wood's nightmares during the pandemic.

==== Music videos and competitions ====
The annually televised Eurovision Song Contest was forced to be cancelled at short notice, the first time in its 65-year history. A special broadcast called Eurovision: Europe Shine a Light was quickly produced and aired in its place across 45 countries.

The music video for the song "Phenom" by Thao & the Get Down Stay Down was recorded entirely via the "rigid grid format of the teleconferencing app Zoom," while the band members were in home isolation. Described as "the finest music video to emerge from our age of isolation," it took eight days to complete.

The music video for "Lose Somebody" by Kygo and One Republic used large green screen footage and wild images while working remote from each other due to COVID-19 restrictions. The video for "Freedom", also by Kygo and featuring Zak Abel, was shot separately from their homes and focused on their lives while under stay-at-home orders.

In November 2020, K-pop boy band BTS released the song "Life Goes On", which described their lives during the pandemic as they lived in isolation, without the in person interaction of their fans and concerts. More personal and "sentimental" in nature, it presented the band living together in isolation in their dorm. The video is intercut with a clip of V driving his bandmates around South Korea and eventually past Seoul Olympic Stadium, where the band was slated to kickoff their Map of the Soul Tour several months prior before it was cancelled due to the pandemic. The video ends with a sequence of the band envisioning themselves singing the song in the empty stadium. At a press conference held the day of Be's release, Jungkook said that his intent with the music video was to express the "sadness and the longing" the band felt due to the tour's cancellation "and because we couldn't see ARMY much".

Arivum Anbum (transl. Knowledge and Love – transl. Wisdom and Love) is an Indian Tamil-language song released on 23 April 2020, by Think Music India on YouTube in response to the pandemic in India. The song was composed by Ghibran and lyrics by Kamal Haasan. It was sung by 12 singers and recorded by the artistes from their homes. The lyrics of the song talk about the need to use "our heart and intelligence" to battle the crisis. The video also features visuals of the mass exodus of migrant labourers from cities across the country.

==== Release schedules ====
Due to movie theaters shutting down, some movies originally intended for theatrical release have instead premiered on streaming services. Disney's Mulan premiered on Disney+ in September 2020, and Warner Brothers' film Wonder Woman 1984 was released on 25 December on HBO Max.

Some movies, such as the James Bond entry No Time to Die, were postponed for over a year due to the pandemic.

=== Music ===
As people turned to music to relieve emotions evoked by the pandemic, Spotify listenership showed that classical, ambient, and children's genres grew due to COVID-19 while it remained relatively the same for pop, country, and dance. Out of these latter genres, however, country appears to be the most resilient, with popularity soaring by 15.8%.

Other examples of music influenced by COVID-19 include:

- Markus J. Buehler at Massachusetts Institute of Technology produced a musical score from a sonification algorithm and the structure of the virus' S (spike) protein. Beyond the aesthetic appeal of the outcome of the analysis, it may offer another method of finding potential binding sites for therapeutic targets and thereby assist with treatment.
- Australian musicians Tim Minchin and Briggs produced the song HouseFyre—satirising Prime Minister Scott Morrison's leadership during the preceding months—whilst under isolation in their respective homes. The video clip was filmed from their mobile phones, with proceeds from the song's sale going towards a fundraiser for indigenous artists.
- Musician iMarkkeyz remixed an Instagram video by rapper Cardi B to release the song "Coronavirus" in mid-March. It reached No. 1 on the Brazilian iTunes chart and No. 9 the US, and was called "the first stirring of what a future historian may call pandemic pop".
- British Army veteran Captain Tom Moore raised more than $55 million for Britain's National Health Service (NHS) in the middle of the pandemic on the week of his 100th birthday with a version of You'll Never Walk Alone with singer Michael Ball and the NHS Voices of Care Choir, becoming the oldest artist to top the music charts and claim a UK number one single.
- The New York Public Library published an album of "audio landscapes"—recordings of ambient sounds evocative of the city—Missing Sounds of New York (including of the sound of peak hour traffic, a baseball game, a busy restaurant, and of the library's own reading room). Released on 1 May, it had been streamed on Spotify in the first week over 200,000 times and publicly praised by the city's mayor.
- The Finnish National Opera produced the opera Covid fan tutte, which premiered in Helsinki in March 2020. The opera takes its score from Mozart's Così fan Tutte, with an original libretto by Minna Lindgren discussing the effects of the 2020 COVID-19 pandemic on life in Finland.
- Another adaptation designed to give employment to musicians and live entertainment to patrons, was the revival of live concerts played during a break in a restaurant meal, such as the Sydney Symphony Orchestra string trio playing for diners when the restaurant at the Sydney Opera House reopened.
- NPR's "Morning Edition Song Project" has been inviting musicians to submit original songs about their unique experiences during the COVID-19 pandemic.
- Pop stars Justin Bieber and Ariana Grande released a song, "Stuck with U", which was a fundraiser for the First Responders Children's Foundation. The accompanying music video features various celebrities in a video chat, with "squares of Grande and Bieber singing isolated in their homes and video check-ins from fans and famous friends, including Kylie and Kendall Jenner, Stephen and Ayesha Curry and Chance the Rapper with his wife, Kristen Corley."
- British pop musician Charli XCX produced her fourth studio album, how i'm feeling now (2020), during COVID-19 lockdowns as a "do-it-yourself" collaborative process with her fans. Charli XCX has also referred to how i'm feeling now as a "quarantine album", and the album's lyrics contain many references to COVID-19 quarantine and lockdowns. NBC News called how i'm feeling now "the album full of quarantine anthems we need right now" and a "quarantine-defining work".
- New York anti-folk musician Jeffrey Lewis recorded a lo-fi album at home in 2020 inspired by the lockdown experience, entitled 2020 Tapes: Shelter-at-Homerecordings & Pandemos.

=== Literature ===
"For writers, as the tentacles of the coronavirus unfurl each day, everything is copy. But what happens when every writer on the planet starts taking notes on the same subject? Will we all hand in our book reports simultaneously, a year from now? The nature of tragedy is that it takes more than it gives, but it's also produced some of our most iconic literature."
Author Sloane Crosley

- The novel Lockdown by Peter May, written in 2005 and describing a global pandemic, was originally rejected for publication for being "unrealistic". When a fan requested that May write something related to the COVID-19 pandemic, the author said he thought about it for a minute before he "realized that I've kind of already done it." It was published in April 2020.
- Horror and supernatural fiction author Stephen King backdated the setting of Billy Summers from 2020 to 2019, so that the characters could plausibly congregate and go on a cruise ship.
- Paolo Giordano, Italian physicist and award-winning author of the Premio Strega, published his thoughts about the virus outbreak in an essay entitled How Contagion Works in March 2020. It was quickly translated into more than 20 languages.
- Italian virologist and author Roberto Burioni published Virus. La grande sfida [Virus. The Great Challenge], an examination of how epidemics shape civilizations in March 2020. The proceeds went toward research on the virus.
- Italian publisher Garzanti published Andrà tutto bene (Everything will be fine), an anthology of twenty-six short stories and essays about quarantine from a range of writers including children's author Elisabetta Gnone. Profits from the sale of the e-book went to the Pope John XXIII Hospital in Bergamo.
- Inspired by how many compared the COVID-19 response in the UK to the British sitcom Dad's Army, English historian and writer Niles Schilder wrote four scripts for the Dad's Army Appreciation Society, three of which looked at how the characters from the series would have dealt with the pandemic.
- The COVID-19 pandemic inspired the 2020 romance novelette Kissing the Coronavirus.
- LeVar Burton, host of Reading Rainbow, announced his desire to perform live-streamed readings of books for his podcast LeVar Reads but that copyright law was unclear as to whether this was allowed. Neil Gaiman replied to Burton via Twitter, giving him permission to read any of his works.
- The COVID-19 pandemic inspired the Javanese language audiobook novel, Endahe Lintang Kemukus (The Beauty of Comets) by Ki Dr. Budiono Santoso Setradjaja, Ph.D., SpFK, a clinical pharmacologist who was interested about Javanese culture. Published by Yayasan Saworo Tino Triatmo (YASATRI).
- 'Corona Says' is a poem written during COVID-19 pandemic by Nepalese poet Vishnu Singh Rai. The poem is part of English language grade ii school curriculum in Nepal.

=== Performing arts ===
Madrid's Teatro Real debuted a modified version of Verdi's La Traviata where COVID-19 physical distancing restrictions were incorporated into the production. Performers began on stage wearing surgical masks, the staging featured a grid of 2m-wide taped red lines on the floor, with all actors' movements choreographed to remain apart, and the opera itself was selected as the plot features tuberculosis.

Tamas Detrich, director of the Stuttgart Ballet, commissioned eight contemporary dance works "created within and for these straitened circumstances", three of which were premiered at the company's first post-shutdown event Response 1.

Several professional dancers and companies, both classical and contemporary, filmed and published new works which responded to themes of isolation. Either through in the choreography itself (e.g. Rhiannon Faith's Drowntown), in the location (e.g. empty public places Taylor Stanley outside the Lincoln Center, choreography by Kyle Abraham), or the filming technique (e.g. in Flying Home by street dance group BirdGang via "...the now all-too-familiar segmented Zoom-style screen").

The show believed to be the first full capacity premiere of a play anywhere in the world since the pandemic began was a theatrical adaptation of the popular children's television show Bluey entitled Bluey's Big Play, The Stage Show. After months of delay, the play - developed by Windmill Theatre Company from an original story by Bluey's creator Joe Brumm with new music by Bluey composer, Joff Bush - made its debut in Brisbane in late December 2020 at the Queensland Performing Arts Centre.

=== Visual art ===
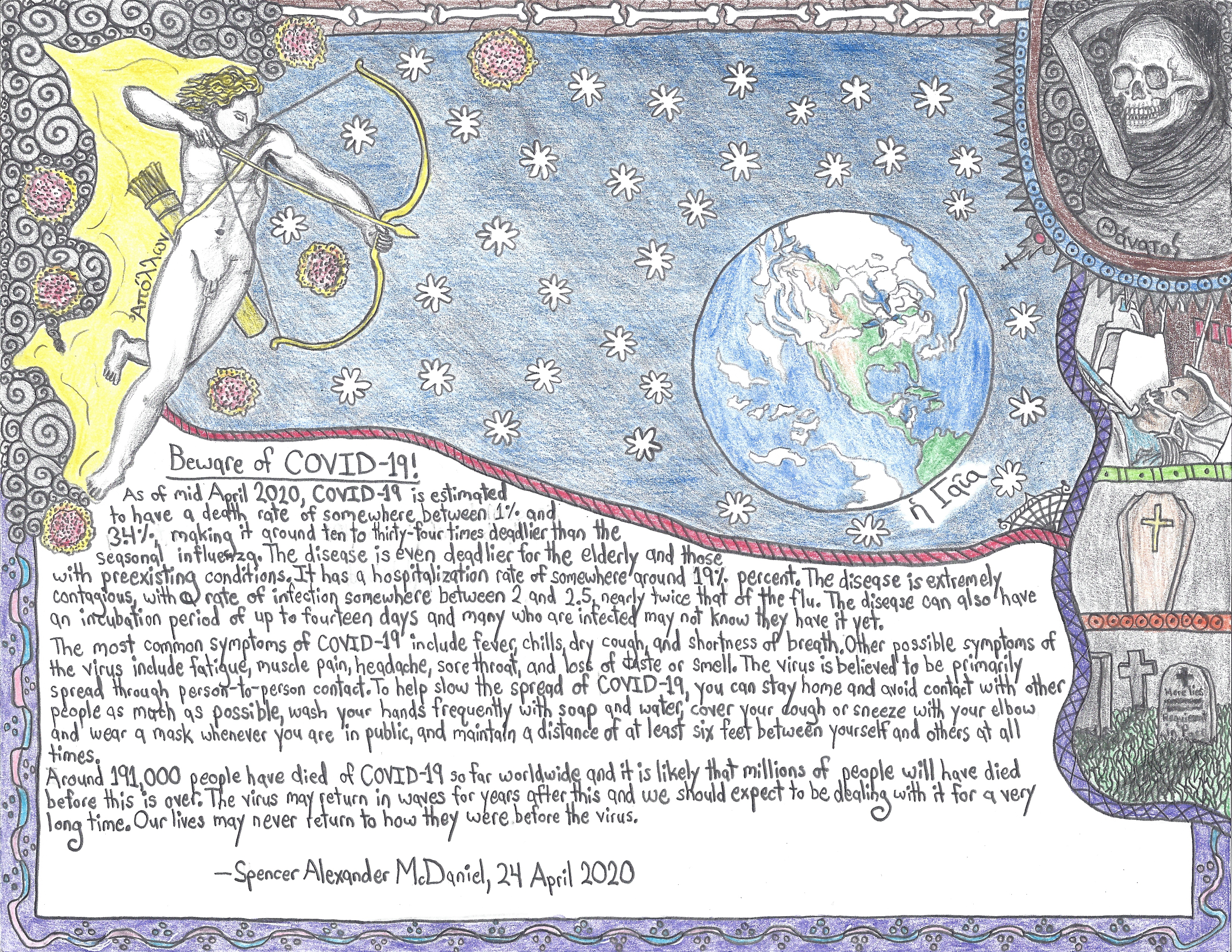
- Illustration of Plague and Death encircling the Earth, by Spencer Alexander McDaniel
  In April, street artist Banksy published a new piece of his trademark wall art—this time located in his own bathroom, referencing the required self-isolation—with coronavirus as the theme and "stir-crazy rats" as its subject. He published photographs of it online. In July he continued the rats theme, with several stencil graffiti of rats wearing and playing with facemasks in a London tube carriage.
- Artists in the United Kingdom painted portraits of National Health Service workers for free, as a way of recognizing their contributions, and with a view to holding an exhibition once the pandemic subsides.
- Damien Hirst produced two versions of a new poster artwork entitled Butterfly Rainbow—one as a free download "to raise the spirits", and another to be sold in limited edition as a fundraiser for the UK's National Health Service.
- Sculptor Antony Gormley created Hold while in lockdown—a small human figure made of dark clay, "resting its head between tightly wound arms, clasping bent knees and shoulders. Toes curled inwards" which he described as "trying to make an objective equivalent for the state that we're all in". It was "exhibited online" at White Cube gallery.
- Artist Sara Shakeel created a series of digital images to encourage proper hand washing and to thank health care workers, by depicting both collaged with the artist's signature glitter and crystals.

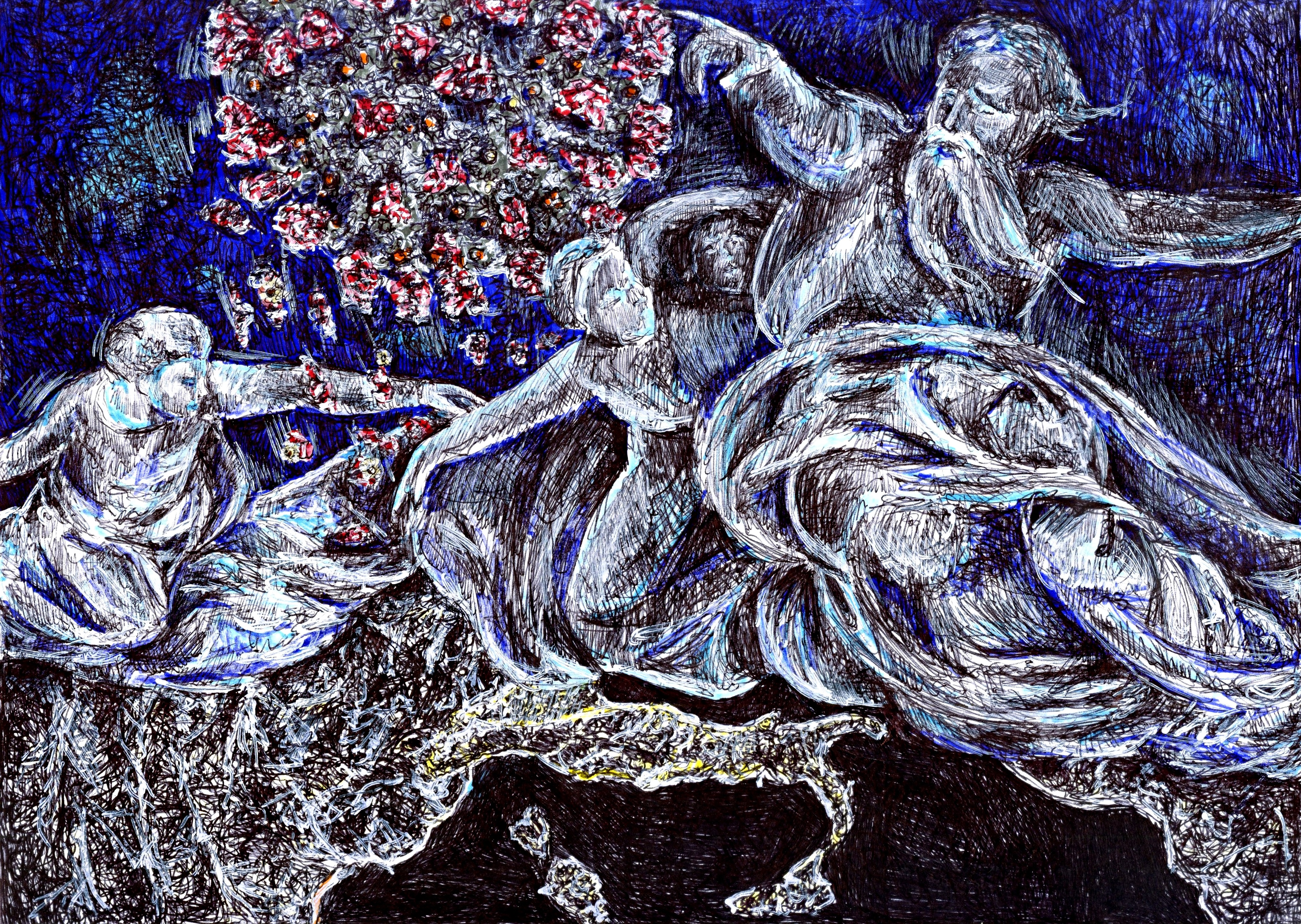
E guarirai da tutte le malattie.. ed io, avrò cura di te, by Giovanni Guida

- Italian artist Giovanni Guida created E guarirai da tutte le malattie.. ed io, avrò cura di te [And you'll be cured of all diseases.. and I'll take care of you], a grattage illustration of God fighting the virus in a composition referencing Michelangelo's The Creation of the Sun and Moon. The work was described by Italian media as having gone "viral".
- Dissident Chinese artist Ai Weiwei created "an initial batch" of 10,000 surgical masks with hand screen-printed illustrations of "sunflower seeds, mythical beasts and... a defiant middle finger". The items are to be sold via eBay with proceeds being donated to Human Rights Watch, Refugees International and Médecins Sans Frontières.
- Over 70 comic strips participated in The Big Thank You Search of 2020. Each strip included six symbols of workers who were essential during the pandemic.
- For the 2020 edition of the annual photography festival Cortona on the Move, organizers commissioned photographers for an exhibition entitled The COVID 19 visual project—the first Italian arts festival since the health emergency began. A virtual exhibition was also produced.
- Graffiti artist Banksy also raised more than £2,500,000 for the NHS, with a production of the work to remain in the hospital. The image is 1m x 1m in size, and it was hung in collaboration with the hospital's managers in foyer near the emergency room. The image shows a child holding a figure of a masked nurse wearing a cape. This black and white painting was considered a " universal tribute" to staff at Southampton General Hospital. The artwork was used to raise money for the hospital.
- Google Arts and Culture digitized thousand museums for people to "visit" these museums virtually from home. These museums include Hammer Museum in L.A, Anne Frank House, National Museum of Indonesia, Ghent Altarpiece in Belgium etc. Google Arts and Culture made visitors become virtual globetrotters and see arts and exhibitions from over 1200 thousand museums around the world. It also provides the Zoom capability for people to explore the artworks in detail. The Ghent Altarpiece in Belgium also includes detailed descriptions of the works to make visitors' virtual learning experiences as good as in-person visits. Google Arts & Culture.
- Artist Francisca Lita Sáez created three artworks that show the experience of physicians during Spain's COVID-19 pandemic. The acrylic and pastel artworks all show the defenseless people's confrontation with the COVID-19 virus, which was hard to control. The combination of physicians' experience and art shows a visual representation of clinical magnitude and human's fight for survival. The three artworks entitled are The Threat (2020); An Unequal Fight (2020) and Stop Pandemic (2020).

==== Digital marketing ====
Many website companies had to alter their digital marketing strategies to either attract more page visits and orders, or discourage misleading advertisements that may reduce website credibility and traffic.

To prevent misleading information, Facebook removed more than seven million ad posts listed as faulty information in relation to the COVID-19 virus. With other marketing techniques, digital marketers began depicting safe habits around the virus, altering their advertisements to include practices of social distancing, staying at home, cleanliness, and the usage of masks. For example, NORAD, the North American Aerospace Defense Command, continued its Santa Claus tracking on 24 December 2020, but added a mask to the cartoon Santa on his sleigh.

==== E-commerce websites ====
A chart from Bazaarvoice.com shows a Year-over-Year ("YoY") increase in monthly page views and order counts from 1 January – 30 June 2020, averaged from 6,200 different e-commerce (ECOM) websites.

As seen from the chart, before major statewide quarantines, ECOM was already starting to see increases in page views and orders from January - March, increasing 14% in page views and 19% in orders. When former President Donald Trump issued COVID-19 a National Emergency in mid-March, both page views and order counts had a YoY increase to 96% and 88%, respectively. The trending psychology behind this surge in ECOM usage is since most people at this time were in fear of in-person and Brick-in-Mortar alternatives that were still open at the time.

The top trending ECOM sites amid the pandemic from highest YoY growth to least were Toys and Games, Business and Industrial, Sporting Goods, Hardware, Home & Garden, Entertainment, Animal & Pet Supplies, Electronics, and Food/Beverages/Tobacco. Down trending ECOM websites include those that sell products used in pre-pandemic times, such as Luggage websites. Luggage and Bag websites were one of the only websites to see over 10% decreases in page views and order counts.

==== Financial technology ====
The COVID-19 pandemic has presented tail-winds to website usage. Financial analysts predicted that for many payment providers, it could also drive new purchasing habits that could leave the companies in a stronger position once the crisis is over. Credit card network websites such as Visa.com, PayPal.com, and Mastercard.com saw page view and payment volume growth pressured by temporary business closures, elevated unemployment, and a cutback on international travel. Due to social distancing and shelter-in-place, these companies saw people increasingly move their spending online, as seen with the increase in E-commerce popularity. However, for websites such as Squareup.com, with many brick and mortar operations, COVID-19 had negative impacts.

==== Live chats and video streaming websites ====
Schools and businesses worldwide have altered their business structure to an online means of learning and work. As a result of the new norm to online chat and video streaming methods, websites such as Zoom saw massive growth in page visits and user volume. Through these websites users could continue work, communication, and education without risks from COVID-19.

== In social media ==
Amateur content creators created and shared among themselves many memes (notably in the form of art-recreations, songs, and videos) during the isolation period.

=== Trends ===
During the course of the pandemic, the social media app TikTok grew the most, lending to a number of new trends in digital pop culture including video games like Animal Crossing, Among Us and Genshin Impact, banana bread baking, Tiger King memes, and quarantines. The increasing popularity of TikTok led to the development of similar-looking features on other social media platforms, such as Instagram Reels and YouTube Shorts.

=== Social media usage ===
People overall spent more time on social media in 2020 than the year before. However, the attitudes and habits did show a change. Users felt less inclined to share overly positive or unimportant information in the midst of the rising death tolls. At the same time, there was increased posting about social activism surrounding the 2020 Black Lives Matter protests. Video-focused sites like TikTok gained attraction, which was speculated as being perhaps due to the social factor of seeing other users.

=== Anxiety ===
In the early stage of the pandemic, a survey conducted by Gao J. Zheng showed a high prevalence of mental health problems, which is positively associated with frequent exposure to social media. Many posts on TikTok focused on young people's anxiety, social distancing, and isolation.

Unlike TikTok, whose users are mostly young people, the overall attitude towards the pandemic was different on Twitter. For example, a study on Twitter users during the pandemic shows overall higher positive sentiments. Among Twitter users, 48,157(51.97%) users expressed positive feelings, while 31,553 (34.05%) were neutral, and the rest of the tweets - amounting to 12,936 (13.96%) - showed negative emotions. One major reason behind the prominence of positive sentiment is that most people still appreciated the government and health workers despite their personal anxieties.

== In sports ==
COVID-19 forced difficult and financially depleting decisions on the sports industry. Nearly every major sporting event in the sports-event industry was canceled, moved, or postponed in the midst of the outbreak. Teams were forced to withdraw from specific tournaments or entire seasons. For example, in March 2020, during the Sweet 16, the Rams were forced to withdraw their position in the tournament after multiple players caught the COVID-19 virus. A 2019-2020 YoY revenue growth chart listed on Forbes Magazine showed that YoY revenue growth had dramatically downsized for major sports leagues due to these cancellations.

A 2020 chart from Forbes Magazine shows a revenue growth comparison of major sports leagues from 2019 to 2020.

For the 2020 Summer Olympics, foreign spectators were banned from attending the games in Japan without a 100 percent refund. Moreover, the vaccinations rates were increased, and Major League Baseball gave the news to provide vaccine facilities in their stadiums. Vaccinations of the athletes were an ethical issue, if it was legal and ethical. The NBA announced vaccinations were not mandatory, but vaccinated players would be more flexible. According to ESPN, the NBA were allowing vaccinated athletes to not wear masks in the training facilities, with extra freedom traveling. Before the vaccinations, the NBA was continuing in a bubble, where players were not allowed to leave. Players inside the bubble were wearing sensors for social distancing. Reporters who wanted to get inside the bubble were required for temperature and oxygen checks and COVID tests. The benches of the NBA athletes were changed, and they became socially distanced. Without their fans, some of the old NBA coaches were still wearing masks during the games. Popovich, the oldest coach in the NBA, who is 74, said that "I don't want to die", when he was asked about wearing masks.

Professional wrestling largely ceased, with WWE holding all events in their empty Performance Center in Orlando, Florida, while AEW held all its shows in an empty arena, also in Florida. Other companies such as ROH, Impact Wrestling and New Japan Pro Wrestling postponed and or outright cancelled shows. WWE would eventually implement the ThunderDome, an arena filled with screens showing fans watching the shows at home.
