= Così fan tutte (disambiguation) =

Così fan tutte is a 1790 Italian-language comic opera by Mozart.

Così fan tutte or variations may also refer to:

- Così fan tutte (film), or All Ladies Do It, a 1992 Italian sex-comedy
- Così fan tutte (TV series), an Italian sketch comedy, 2009–2012
- Così fan tutte pasticcio Coronation Mass, a parody mass based on Mozart's opera
- Cosi Fan Tutti, a 1997 novel by Michael Dibdin

== See also ==
- Cosi (disambiguation)
- Così fan tutte discography, a list of recordings of Mozart's opera
- Cosey Fanni Tutti, an English performance artist, musician, and writer
- Cosi Fan Tutti Frutti, a 1985 album Squeeze
- Covid fan tutte, a 2020 comic opera depicting life during the first several months of the COVID-19 pandemic
