= Ferrarese =

A Ferrarese is a citizen of Ferrara, Italy.

It may also refer to:

== People ==
- Adriana Ferrarese del Bene (c. 1755–after 1804), Italian operatic soprano
- Don Ferrarese (born 1929), former Major League Baseball pitcher
- Enrique Ferrarese (1882–1968), Italian Argentine real estate developer
- Luigi Ferrarese (1795–1855), Italian physician
- Claudio Ferrarese (born 1978), Italian footballer

== Other ==
- Coppia ferrarese, a type of sourdough bread
- Ferrarese dialect of Emilian, spoken in the Province of Ferrara

== See also ==
- Ferrara
