= Melodrama/Random/Melbourne =

2018 film directed by Matthew Victor Pastor

- Theatrical release poster
- Directed by: Matthew Victor Pastor
- Produced by: Matthew Victor Pastor; Odin B. Fernandez
- Music by: Fergus Cronkite
- Release date: March 7, 2018 (Sinag Maynila Film Festival)
- Running time: 82 minutes

Melodrama/Random/Melbourne is an Australian feature film about a young feminist filmmaker documenting the men's rights movement and seduction community pickup artist (PUA) movement. The film is part two in Matthew Victor Pastor's Fil-Aus trilogy. It had its Australian premiere at the 2018 Adelaide Film Festival, Philippine premiere at the 2018 Sinag Maynila Film Festival and its North American premiere at the 2018 Mammoth Lakes Film Festival. In 2019 the film's soundtrack was nominated for the 67th edition of the FAMAS Award (Filipino Academy of Movie Arts and Sciences Award) for composer Fergus Cronkite.

== Synopsis ==
A pickup artist's, a feminist documentarian's and a virgin's lives collide. Aries Santos is struggling to complete her new film. Her subjects are men's rights activists. Meanwhile, a sex worker named Melody works at night. Blood is shed.

== Cast ==
- Celina Yuen as Melody
- Bridget Moy O'Brien as Aries
- Rachel E. Zuasola as Tita Agnes

== Reception ==
"A stunning discovery, Matthew Victor Pastor's Melodrama/Random/Melbourne! is a pastiche of many attempts—both somewhat successful or outright failures—to be something. Vague in terms of form and substance, the film, without even perusing its scatterings of plot and characters, is a brash reflection of the waywardness and captivating caprice of the unique millennial culture brought about by cross-border migration. The setting here is Melbourne, a city that the film depicts as one that is undergoing transformation into a bustling centre of distinct Asian influences. However, its young and rebellious citizens, heirs of those from a generation that needed to make the city its home, are themselves repelling the waves of new migration, sowing seeds of division."

The film was also an honourable mention in Rappler's 12 best Filipino Films of 2018.

Bill Mousoulis the founding editor of Senses of Cinema said: "This is breathtaking cinema that is just extraordinary. It's one of the best Australian films of this decade"

Jake Wilson of The Age put it on his 'top 5 films of the week', "In the spirit of Godard and Wong Kar-Wai, local writer-director Matthew Victor Pastor throws every available idea into this wild goose chase through Melbourne after dark... An arresting introduction to a talent going places."

In a negative review, Stephanie Mayo of Concept News Central said: "Twenty minutes into the movie, I walked out of the cinema. I could no longer endure the film. I thought it pretentious and messy, and the sex talk stilted."

The film premiered at the 2018 Sinag Maynila Film Festival and was awarded Best Original Score (Fergus Cronkite).

== Awards ==
| Year | Award | Category | Artist | Result |
|---|---|---|---|---|
| 2018 | Sinag Maynila Film Festival | Best Original Score | Fergus Cronkite (Composer) | Won |
| 2019 | FAMAS Award | Outstanding Achievement in Musical Score | Fergus Cronkite (Composer) | Nominated |
