= Matthew Victor Pastor =

Filipino Australian film director (born 1989)

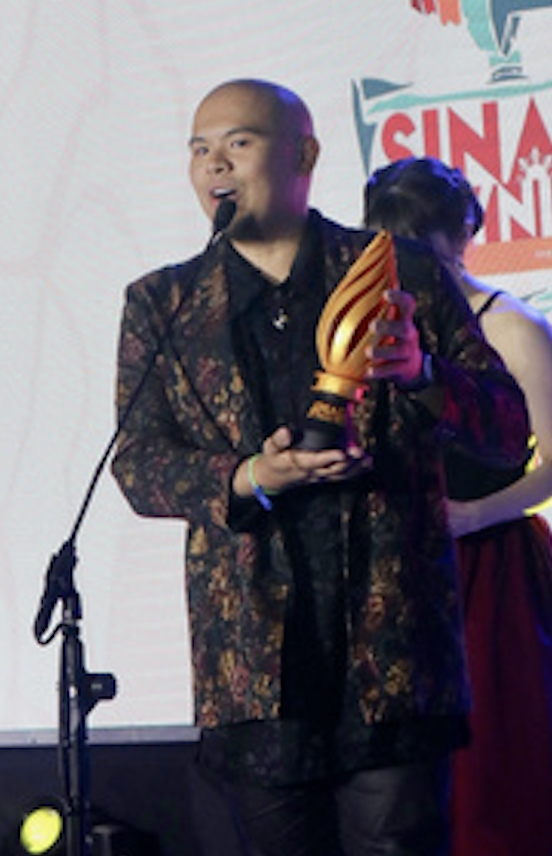
- Pastor at the 2018 Sinag Maynila Film Festival
- Born: 2 March 1989 (age 37); Melbourne, Victoria, Australia
- Education: Victorian College of the Arts
- Occupations: Film director; film producer; screenwriter; actor
- Years active: 2013–present

Matthew Victor Pastor (born 2 March 1989) is an Australian film director. His feature films explore Asian Australian identity, and tell Filipino Australian stories. An alumnus of the Victorian College of the Arts, University of Melbourne Faculty of VCA and MCM, his feature film Melodrama/Random/Melbourne had its Australian premiere at the 2018 Adelaide Film Festival. Part one of his 2020 Trilogy of feature films about the COVID-19 pandemic The Neon Across the Ocean had its world premiere at the 44th São Paulo International Film Festival in the International Perspective section. In 2021 A Pencil to the Jugular had its world premiere at the FIAPF accredited 43rd Moscow International Film Festival.

== Fil-Aus Trilogy ==
The Fil-Aus trilogy are three films exploring Filipino Australians identity.

Part one, I am Jupiter I am the Biggest Planet, is a silent short film set in the red-light district of Manila. Part two, Melodrama/Random/Melbourne!, is a narrative feature film about a young feminist documentarian and her journey documenting the Men's rights movement and Seduction community PUA movement. Part three, Maganda, or (Pinoy Boy vs Milk Man), is an '80s Filipino/Australian B movie throwback about a deranged killer dubbed the Milk Man & the assassin Pinoy Boy on a mission to stop him.

In a review of Melodrama/Random/Melbourne, a critic described the film as an exploration of themes related to identity, migration, and generational change within Melbourne's multicultural environment. The review noted the film's unconventional narrative structure and its depiction of tensions surrounding immigration and cultural transformation in contemporary urban Australia, particularly among younger generations navigating the city's evolving social landscape.

The film was also an honorable mention in Rappler's 12 best Filipino Films of 2018.

On Melodrama/Random/Melborune!, Bill Mousoulis the founding editor of Senses of Cinema said: "This is breathtaking cinema that is just extraordinary. It's one of the best Australian films of this decade." He also described Pastor as "the most dynamic young filmmaker I've come across in 35 years of indie film watching in Australia."

Jake Wilson of The Age said: "In the spirit of Godard and Wong Kar-Wai, local writer-director Matthew Victor Pastor throws every available idea into this wild goose chase through Melbourne after dark... An arresting introduction to a talent going places."

The film premiered at the 2018 Sinag Maynila Film Festival and was awarded Best Original Score (Fergus Cronkite). The film was also nominated for the 67th edition of the FAMAS Award (Filipino Academy of Movie Arts and Sciences Award) in the music category for his composer Fergus Cronkite (Andrew Tran).

In a negative review, Stephanie Mayo of Concept News Central said: "Twenty minutes into the movie, I walked out of the cinema. I could no longer endure the film. I thought it pretentious and messy, and the sex talk stilted."

Part 3 Maganda! Pinoy Boy vs Milk Man had its premiere at Monster Fest. Glenn Cochrane of Fakeshemp.net said, "There isn't a filmmaker in Australia as distinctive or eccentric, and what MVP puts on the screen is the entire inner-workings of his mind. MAGANDA is a culmination of his past work and serves as a self-inflicted exorcism of his mind's congestion."

== 2020 Trilogy ==
He is in post-production on a number of diverse Asian Australian films dealing with social issues unique to the Australian landscape. With these projects currently in post-production If Magazine coined him, "Australia's most prolific filmmaker". 2020 embarks production of his thematic 2020 trilogy capturing the Future, Present & Past of the global pandemic. He explains the process of making the 2020 Trilogy in Issue 97 of Senses of Cinema. "The two films I was working on in early 2020 would eventually become 1 and 2 of the trilogy: The Neon Across the ocean and A Pencil to the Jugular. The rapid changes in society caused me great anxiety and loneliness. The anxiety and isolation are predominant moods felt through the films. The pandemic is not over and globally this is something we can’t even comprehend. Even when these films are completed and released a feeling of melancholy in society will linger, an unresolved pain." The Neon Across the Ocean world premiered at the 44th São Paulo International Film Festival with some of the first films based on the COVID-19 pandemic, such as Coronation (2020 film) by Ai Weiwei. The second installment in the trilogy world premiered at the 43rd Moscow International Film Festival. The film explores some of the social and racial injustices which have arisen during the pandemic. Pastor has said in Philippine Daily Inquirer about the 2020 trilogy "I feel we should talk about these experiences because they encourage people to stand up as opposed to accepting this as normal." The film is unique as it was co-written by international student Lorena Zarate and has a fresh perspective on life in Australia for people who are marginalised.

== Filmography ==
=== Feature films ===
Year	Title	Director	Producer	Writer	Notes
2018	Melodrama/Random/Melbourne	Yes	Yes	Yes	Co-written with Celina Yuen
2019	A Bigger Jail	Yes	Yes	Yes	
2020	The Neon Across The Ocean	Yes	Yes	Yes	Part of the 2020 trilogy
2021	A Pencil to the Jugular	Yes	Yes	Yes	Part of the 2020 trilogy.
2022	In Heaven They Sing Karaoke	Yes	Yes	Yes	In post production.

=== Short films ===
Year	Title	Director	Producer	Writer	Notes
2016	I am JUPITER I am the BIGGEST PLANET	Yes	Yes	Yes	Victorian College of the Arts graduate film
2019	Between Worlds: Filipino/Australian	Yes	Yes	Yes	
2020	Fun Times	Yes			Supported by Film Victoria, AFTRS, Screen Australia diversity talent fund

=== Experimental Works ===
Year	Title	Director	Producer	Writer	Notes
2013	Made In Australia	Yes	Yes	Yes	
2017	Butterfly Flower: Please Wait To Be Seated	Yes			Featuring Poetry by Khavn De La Cruz
2018	MAGANDA! Pinoy Boy vs Milk Man	Yes	Yes	Yes	Co-written with Kiefer Findlow
2019	Repent or Perish	Yes	Yes	Yes	Presented at Australian new wave Bill Mousoulis & Oz Asia Festival

== Awards ==
Year	Award	Category	Work	Result
2017	Los Angeles Asian Pacific Film Festival	Golden Reel Award - Best Short Film	I am JUPITER I am the BIGGEST PLANET	Nominated
2017	Sinag Maynila Film Festival	Best Short Film	I am JUPITER I am the BIGGEST PLANET	Nominated
2018	Sinag Maynila Film Festival	Best Musical Score (Fergus Cronkite)	MELODRAMA / RANDOM / MELBOURNE!	Won
2018	Sinag Maynila Film Festival	Best Director	MELODRAMA / RANDOM / MELBOURNE!	Nominated
2019	67th FAMAS Award	Outstanding Achievement in Musical Score	MELODRAMA / RANDOM / MELBOURNE!	Nominated
