= Palacio Fuentes =

Coordinates: 32.°S 60.°W

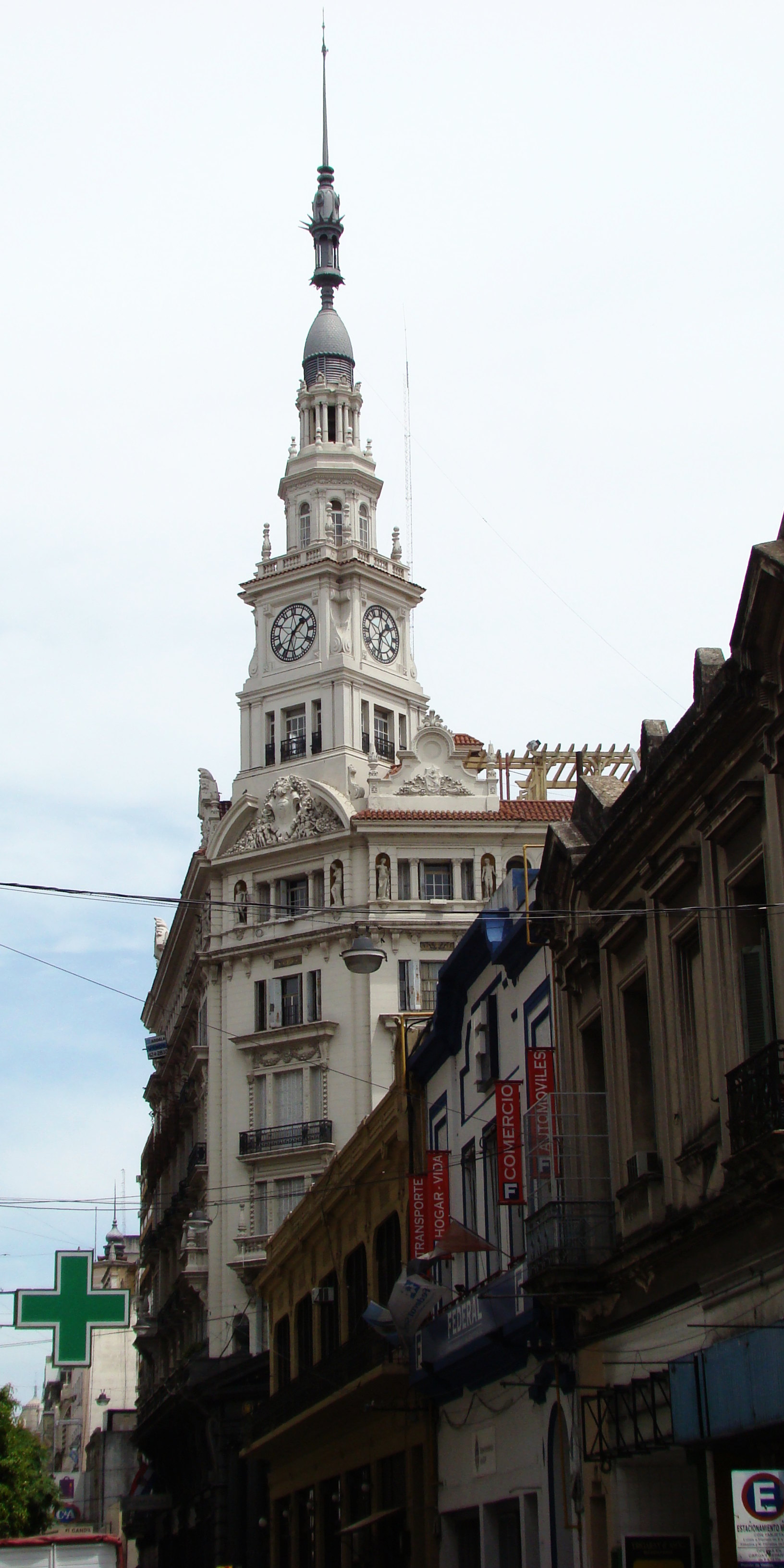
- Palacio Fuentes

General information
- Type: Commercial, Office, Residential
- Location: Rosario, Argentina
- Construction started: 1923
- Completed: 1927

Height
- Height: 60 m (200 ft)

Design and construction
- Architect: Juan Bautista Durand

The Palacio Fuentes is considered one of the architectural landmarks in Rosario, Argentina. The eclectic edifice in a predominantly Beaux-Arts style is located at 722 Sarmiento Street in the heart of Rosario's business district, at the intersection with Santa Fe Street. The palace was named after Juan Fuentes Echeverría, the businessman who commissioned the construction of the building.

== The Developer ==
Ferrarese Bros. Enrico & Guido

Juan Fuentes Echeverría was a Spanish immigrant who settled in Rosario in 1868. Fuentes first worked as a farmer in the neighboring province of Entre Ríos, and later as a dishwasher in Rosario. Eventually he was able to buy a horse-driven cart that he used primarily for scrap metal, which he bought and resold for a good profit. He eventually became a landowner, a stockbreeder and a major player in the agricultural boom of Argentina as a consequence of the high demand for grain in Europe during and after World War I. Immigration to Argentina soon resulted in a shortage of living space, and in the early twenties real estate suddenly became a good business opportunity. Juan Fuentes took advantage of the opportunity, purchasing a lot in the heart of the city's commercial district where he planned to erect the tallest structure in Rosario, a building that would be a reflection of his success.

== The project ==
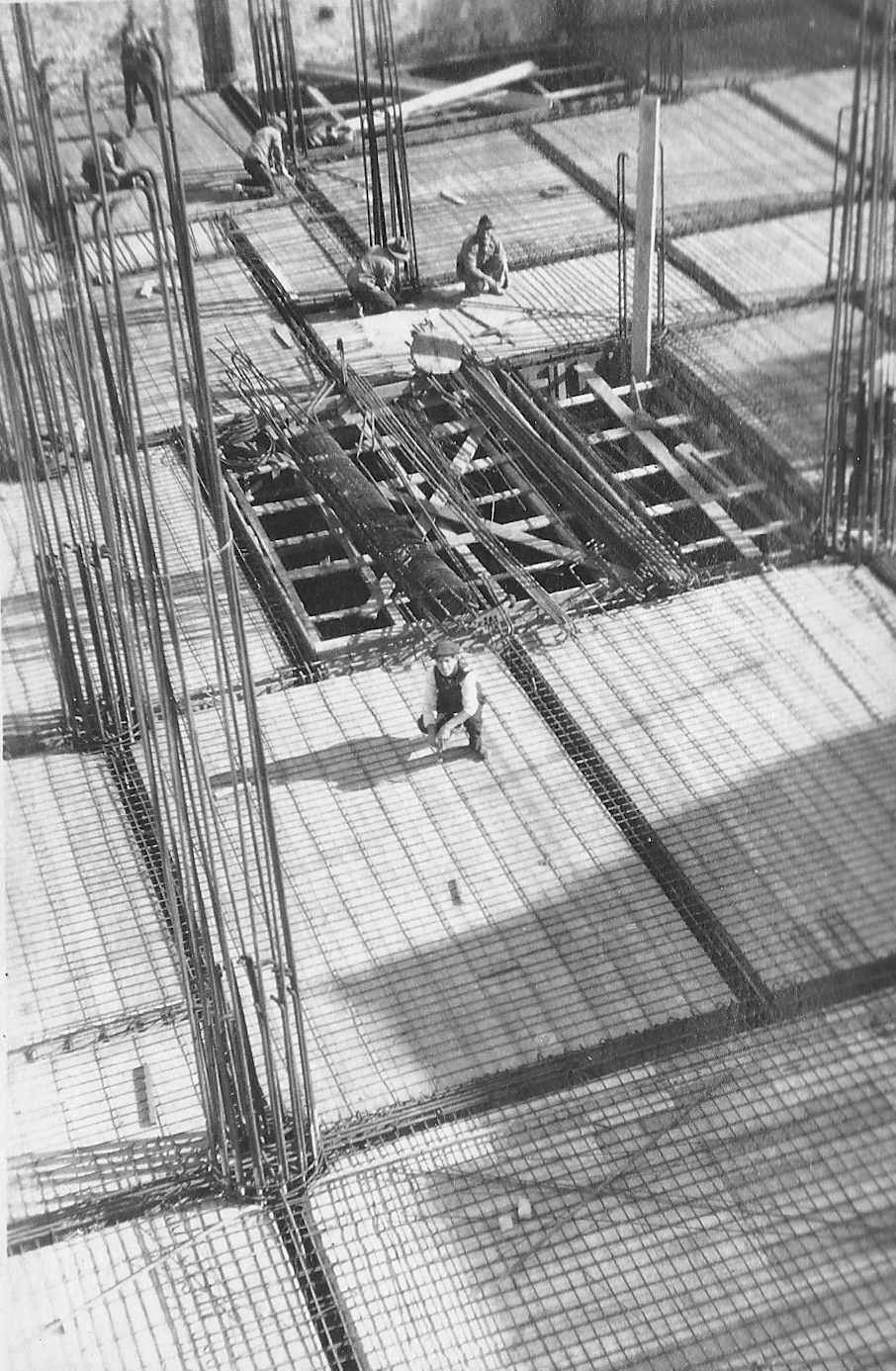
Construction site

Juan Fuentes summoned Juan Bautista Durand, one of the leading architects of his time, one of great experience, not just in Rosario but in the capital city of Buenos Aires, in Córdoba and elsewhere in Argentina. Durand had been responsible for the building of the Federación Agraria Argentina, Club Rosarino de Pelota, and had also been among the founders of the Sociedad de Architectos de Rosario and a faculty member with the Universidad del Litoral, where he pioneered the School of Architecture. Durand was the ideal candidate for the monumental task of building the Palacio Fuentes.

Main brass gates

Detail, bust by Enrique Ferrarese (left panel)

After approval by Fuentes Echeverría, the master plans and blueprints were then turned over to master mason and constructor Enrique Ferrarese of Ferrarese Hnos. y Cía.. The construction took place between 1923 and 1927. The upper floors were to be designated for multiple purposes. The units differ in size and floor plans. Most were conceived as a maze of corridors and openings leading to internal patios. There were offices on the second floor (first in Argentine terms), a dining saloon/tea room and delicatessen, and a cellar with a dance floor in the basement known as the Café Cifré. Ramón Cifré's cafe was richly decorated, some of its details probably inspired by the great coffee houses of Madrid. There were Spanish tiles, dark boiserie with exquisite details, stained glass windows and large mirrors. There was a majolica mural with rural and urban scenes evoking the birthplace of Fuentes in Spain (which still survives, hidden from public view), tapestries by Alfredo Guido, and paintings by Lucio Fontana. The bar counter was made of silver from the mines of Cerro Rico in Bolivia and rested on seven sculptures by Battilana.

The main entrance, at the intersection of the streets named Santa Fe and Sarmiento, was showcased by a magnificent set of brass gates framed by a portico with Corinthian columns. The lower façade of the palace is made of dark green granite. The upper floors feature more Corinthian columns and a loggia with statues. The top floor is crowned by a clock tower guarded by life-sized statues of Venus, Aphrodite and Apollo carved in Italian marble. Above the clock rises a 195-foot lightning rod made from Fuentes's own plow share. Copper lanterns approximately twelve feet tall hang from chains hooked to stands bolted to the exterior walls between the white arches of the balconies, adding a Moorish touch to the already eclectic design.

== The gates ==
The front gates, centered on the southwest corner of the intersection, were made of electrolytic bronze in Greece and consist of a twin set of five paneled vertical sides 3 meters wide by 5 meters high. The door was designed by Manuel Ocampo, inspired by the 14th Century Porta del Paradiso at the Baptistry of San Giovanni in Florence, Italy. Following the Gothic tradition, the door features chiseled bronze busts of the Fuentes, Durand, and Ferrarese. Other reliefs in the gates represent the Seasons, the Four Cardinals, the Muses and the Native Argentine. The central panels bear the monogram of the proprietor, Juan Fuentes. All the inscriptions are in Greek. The other doors on the ground floor have reliefs of the faces of former presidents of Argentina Nicolás Avellaneda and Julio Argentino Roca.
