= Cosi =

Cosi, COSI or CoSi may refer to:

- Così, a 1992 play by Louis Nowra
  - Cosi (film), 1996, based on the play
- Così (restaurant), an American fast-casual restaurant chain
- Compton Spectrometer and Imager, or COSI, a NASA telescope to be launched in 2027
- COSI (Center of Science and Industry), a science museum and research center in Columbus, Ohio, U.S.
- COSI Toledo, now Imagination Station, a science museum in Toledo, Ohio, U.S.
- Cobalt monosilicide, a material with the chemical formula CoSi
- Julián Cosi (born 1998), an Argentine footballer
- Valerio Cosi (born 1985), an Italian musician

== See also ==
- Così fan tutte (disambiguation)
