= Minna Lindgren =

Finnish writer

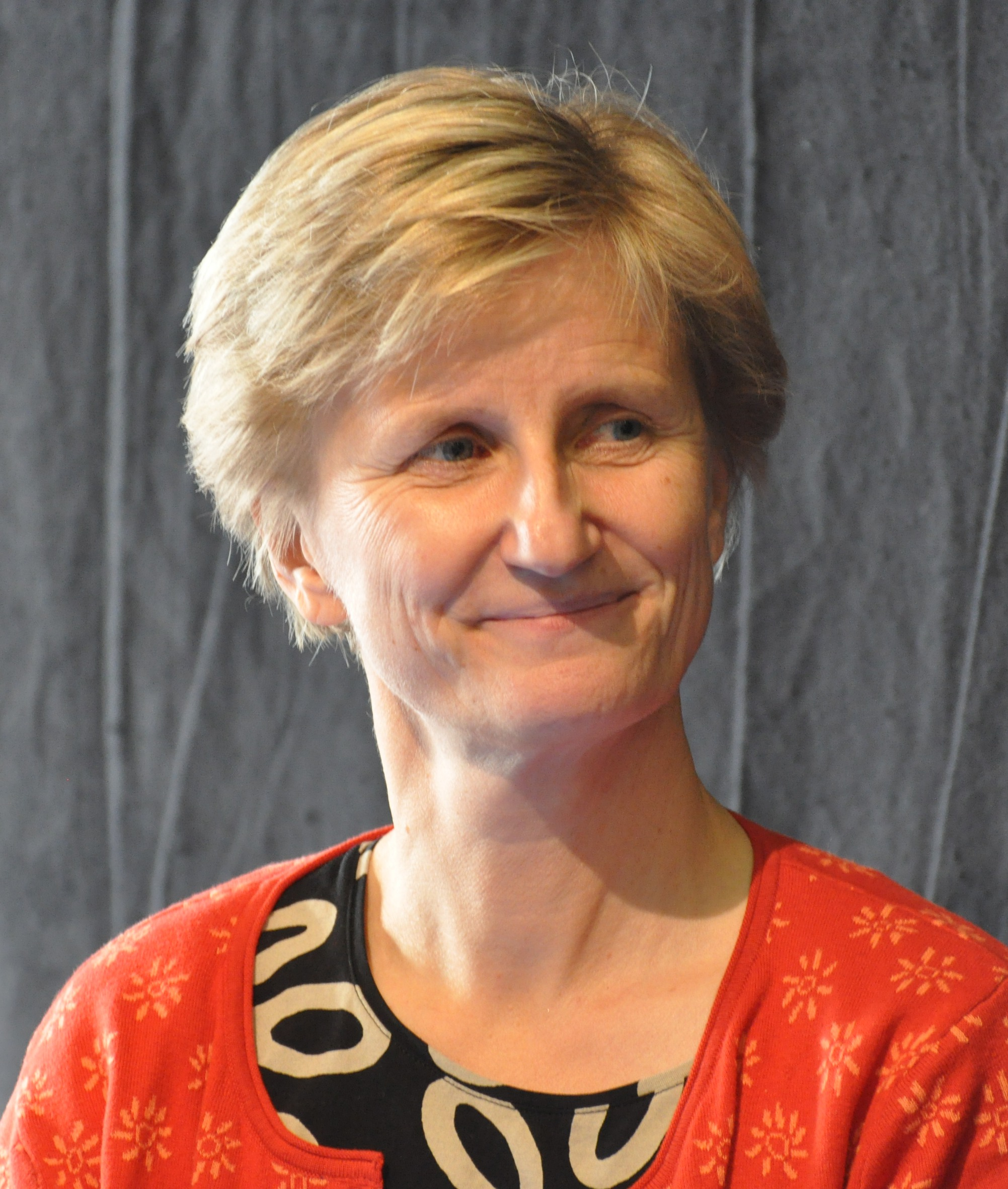
Minna Lindgren

Minna-Liisa Gabriela Lindgren (born 22 January 1963) is a Finnish writer and journalist who is a best-selling crime fiction novelist.

Born in Helsinki, Lindgren has worked as a journalist and columnist and has written works on classical music. Her novels Kuolema Ehtoolehdossa (Death in Twilight Grove, 2013) and Ehtoolehdon pakolaiset (Escape from Twilight Grove, 2014) have both been best-sellers in Finland.

Ehtoolehdon pakolaiset, centred on a 90-year-old female detective living in a senior citizens residence, reached number five on the Finnish best-seller lists in the summer of 2014. The two novels form part of a trilogy, which was completed in 2015 with the publication of The end of Twilight Grove.

The English-language rights to the trilogy were bought by Pan Macmillan. who renamed them the series "The Lavender Ladies Detective Agency". The first of the three novels was translated as Death in Sunset Grove for publication in 2016. Natasha Harding of Pan Macmillan commented "The central characters are both funny and endearing and they make for an interesting detective duo." The second book was published as Escape from Sunset Grove in 2018, followed by The End of Sunset Grove, also in 2018. The books address issues surrounding elder care as a profit-making business, culminating in the third book with the replacement of almost all human contact by technology.

In 2020 Lindgren wrote the libretto for Finnish National Opera's comic opera Covid fan tutte, set to music by Mozart.
