= Così fan tutte pasticcio Coronation Mass =

The Coronation Mass in C major, K. Deest is a parody mass based on Wolfgang Amadeus Mozart's opera Così fan tutte that was offered to Simrock by Carl Zulehner who had also sold the manuscript of the Mass in G major, K. Anh. 232 to the music publisher, with the claim that it was a Mozart "Coronation Mass".

== Background ==
According to von Seyfried's article on the Mass in G major, K. Anh. 232, which is cited by the writer of the music column in The Australasian, Zulehner offered the mass for sale with the claim that it was a "Coronation Mass" by Mozart, but that it was specifically rejected because the prospective purchaser recognised the material used in the setting as coming from Così fan tutte.

Pajot, citing Jahn, states that the manuscript was still in Zulehner's possession when Jahn visited him during the course of writing his biography of Mozart. Jahn noted that Zulehner stated the mass was composed by Mozart some time before he wrote Così fan tutte, but that he believed that it had been created after the publication of that opera by a church musician.

== Structure ==
Pajot, in his summary of Jahn's account, describes the composition as setting all six sections of the mass, but does not make it clear whether the mass was a missa brevis or a missa longa.
