= Enrique Ferrarese =

Italian-Argentine real estate developer

- The Ferrarese Brothers Enrico and Guido
- Born: Enrico Francesco Leopoldo Ferrarese; July 3, 1882; Cerea, Province of Verona, Italy
- Died: January 1, 1968 (aged 85); Rosario, Santa Fe, Argentina
- Other names: Enrico Francesco Leopoldo Ferrarese
- Education: Basic
- Occupations: Builder, Constructor, Mason
- Employer(s): Ferrarese Hermanos & Cia.
- Known for: Palacio Fuentes, Palacio La Rosario
- Successor: Enrique Ferrarese Jr.
- Spouse: Ana Carrasco González
- Partner: Guido Ferrarese
- Children: Enrique, Blanca, Ali, Noemi
- Parent(s): Giuseppe Angelo and Luigia Martini

Enrico Francesco Leopoldo "Enrique" Ferrarese (July 3, 1882 – January 1, 1968) was an Italian Argentine real estate developer.

== Professional life ==
Born in Cerea, Italy in 1882, arrived in Argentina at age 2 with his father, Giuseppe Angelo, and his mother, Luigia Martini, who renamed him Enrique Ferrarese. He married Ana Carrasco González (1888–1924), with whom he fathered four children: Enrique, Blanca, Ali, and Noemí. Enrique founded the construction firm Ferrarese Hermanos & Cia. with his brother Guido. The firm began working mostly on façades, plaster details, and ornamental finishing on other significant projects such as the Bola de nieve (snowball), a large spherical structure on top of a building located in the intersection of Córdoba and Laprida. The warehouse of Ferrarese Hermanos & Cia. was situated at 1251 Callao Street.

The Bola de nieve building is today one of the architectural landmarks of Rosario. Ferrarese Hermanos & Cia. also build family homes and a series of retail service stations for the Dutch oil company, Shell. One of the first major works was the construction of another iconic building in Rosario, the one known as the Palacio "La Rosario", built in 1927 which will later become the birthplace of Ernesto Guevara. "La Rosario", is situated at the intersection of Urquiza and Entre Rios. Next in line came the Palacio Fuentes, A recognizable landmark and one of the first skyscrapers in South America. Other projects carried by Ferrarese Hermanos & Cia. were the "Club Rosarino de Pelota", the "Barrio Fisherton Golf Club", the tribune of "Newell's Old Boys" stadium in Parque de la Independencia, and the building commissioned by Countess of Chateaubriand in Buenos Aires. Enrique Ferrarese died in Rosario on January 1, 1968.

== Gallery ==
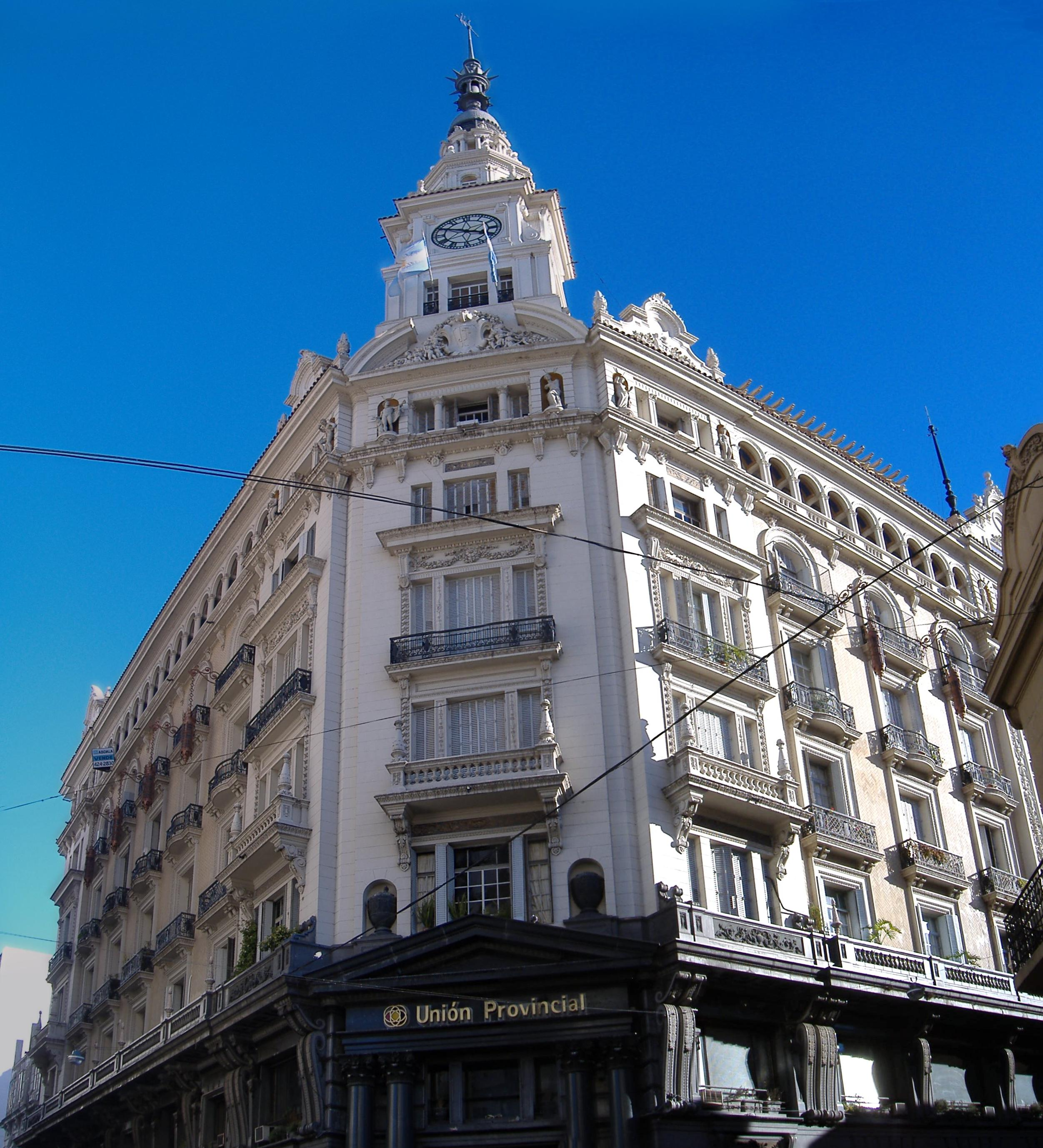
Palacio Fuentes

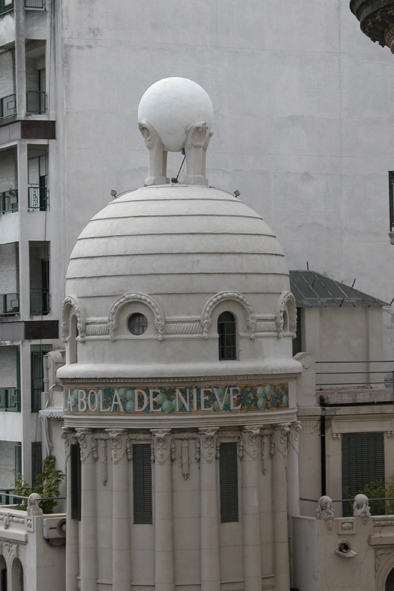
Bola de nieve
