= Bill Mousoulis =

- Born: 14 July 1963; Melbourne, Victoria, Australia
- Other name: Βασίλειος Μουσούλης (Vasilios Mousoulis)
- Occupations: Film director, film critic
- Years active: 1982–present
- Known for: Founding Senses of Cinema

Bill Mousoulis (born Vasilios Mousoulis, Greek: Βασίλειος Μουσούλης; 14 July 1963) is an Australian film director, with approximately 100 films to his name. He is also the founder of the online film journal Senses of Cinema in 1999, and the founder of the film co-operative Melbourne Super 8 Film Group in 1985.

== Biography ==
Bill Mousoulis started making films as an independent filmmaker in 1982, utilising the film medium of Super 8. His films were screened by the Sydney Super 8 Film Group in their annual festivals, and also by Melbourne organisations such as Fringe Network. Mousoulis founded the Melbourne Super 8 Film Group in 1985, to promote and exhibit films by other filmmakers, and the Group lasted until 2001 as an active, recognised organisation.

In the mid-1980s, Mousoulis started receiving grants from the Australian Film Commission to make more professional films. The film Between Us (1989, 37 mins, 16mm) played in film festivals throughout Australia, winning 4th Best Film at the St.Kilda Film Festival, and being nominated for Best Short Fiction at the Dendy Awards, Sydney Film Festival.

Mousoulis started producing and directing feature-length films from 1993, with the film Open City (1993, 80 mins, Super 8). He has made eight feature-length films, including Desire (1999, 77 mins, 16mm), Lovesick (2002, 70 mins, Super 16) and A Nocturne (2007, 70 mins, HDV), which won Best Film at the Melbourne Underground Film Festival in 2007, and is distributed by Troma Entertainment.

Mousoulis' work as a filmmaker is acknowledged by film critic Adrian Martin, who labelled Mousoulis "one of Australia's most committed independent filmmakers". And current writer for The Age newspaper in Melbourne, Jake Wilson, has called Mousoulis "an independent film legend".

Mousoulis has also written occasional film criticism for magazines in the past such as Filmnews, Filmviews and Cantrills Filmnotes. In 1999, Mousoulis founded the online film journal Senses of Cinema, and was the Chief Editor until September 2000, and the Webmaster until May 2001, and the "Great Directors" Editor until July 2002. Senses of Cinema is a continuing journal, with The Times newspaper in the UK naming it "Best Film journal website".

Since 2009, Mousoulis has been based in Greece, doing film reviewing for Senses of Cinema, and journalistic articles for Neos Kosmos, the Greek newspaper based in Melbourne.

== Filmography (selection) ==
- Doubt (1982, 8 mins, Super 8)
- Dreams Never End (1983, 9 mins, Super 8)
- Back to Nature (1985, 13 mins, Super 8)
- Faith (1987, 27 mins, Super 8)
- After School (1988, 20 mins, 16mm)
- Between Us (1989, 37 mins, 16mm)
- Open City (1993, 80 mins, Super 8)
- Ladykiller (1994, 80 mins, Super 8)
- My Blessings (1997, 78 mins, 16mm)
- Desire (1999, 77 mins, 16mm)
- Lovesick (2002, 70 mins, Super 16)
- A Sufi Valentine (2004, 34 mins, video)
- Spring Rhapsody (2004, 84 mins, video)
- Blue Notes (2006, 93 mins, video)
- A Nocturne (2007, 70 mins, video)
- The Experimenting Angel (2010, 7 mins, video)
- Songs of Revolution (2017)

== Awards ==
- 1989 St.Kilda Film Festival – Certificate of Merit, After School
- 1990 St.Kilda Film Festival – 4th Best Film, Between Us
- 1990 Dendy Awards, Sydney Film Festival – nomination Best Short Fiction, Between Us
- 2003 Melbourne Underground Film Festival – Best Cinematography & Most Innovative, Lovesick
- 2005 Melbourne Underground Film Festival – Best Sound & Jury Prize, Spring Rhapsody
- 2006 Melbourne Underground Film Festival – Best Cinematography & Jury Prize & Best Male Support Actor, Blue Notes
- 2007 Melbourne Underground Film Festival – Best Film & Best Female Lead & Best Editing, A Nocturne
