= A Pencil to the Jugular =

2021 Mexican drama film

- Directed by: Matthew Victor Pastor
- Produced by: Matthew Victor Pastor; Evangeline Lee; Lorena Zarate
- Music by: Andrew Tran
- Release date: April 22, 2021 (Moscow International Film Festival)
- Running time: 121 minutes

A Pencil to the Jugular is a 2021 Mexican-Australian drama film set during the COVID-19 lockdowns in Melbourne. It is the second installment in a 2020 trilogy of feature films directed by Matthew Victor Pastor. The film premiered at the 43rd Moscow International Film Festival in April 2021. The film was co-written by Lorena Zarate.

== Synopsis ==
In March 2020 amid the COVID-19 pandemic in Australia, an ensemble of young migrants' lives fall apart. Through the chaos these lives will cross paths and a pencil will be taken to the jugular.

== Cast ==
- Lorena Zarate as Libra
- Felise Morales as Amanda
- Shirong Wu as Ying

== Reception ==
Panos Kotzathanasis of Asian Movie Pulse has said in a review "A Pencil in the Jugular is an uneven film, which can be beautiful at times, features interesting characters and well presented social comments, but suffers from lack of restraint."

== Conception ==
The film is a reaction to the rise of global hate crimes towards Asians during the COVID-19 pandemic. Pastor has stated in inquirer.net “multicultural communities can stand in solidarity ... and allow us (Asians) to write ourselves into history.”

Pastor has also mentioned in an interview with The Swanston Gazette that he is interested in editing a five-hour version of the trilogy making the future, present and past elements of the three films into a singular vision edit with a runtime of 320 minutes. The 5 hour version of the film may act as a full vision.
