= Kissing the Coronavirus =

2020 novel by M. J. Edwards

- First edition
- Author: Robert Winters (under the pseudonym M. J. Edwards)
- Original title: Kissing the Coronavirus
- Language: English
- Genre: Romance
- Published: 22 April 2020
- Publisher: Viral erotica
- Followed by: Kissing the Coronavirus 2: The Second Wave

Kissing the Coronavirus is a 2020 romance novelette written by an anonymous author under the pseudonym M.J. Edwards. The book was published by Viral erotica.

== Background ==
The book was authored by an anonymous author under the pen name M.J. Edwards after he lost his job during the COVID-19 pandemic.

== Synopsis ==
The book centers around a budding romance between Alexa Ashingtonford, a researcher tasked with curing the coronavirus, and an anthropomorphized version of the COVID-19 virus.

== Reception ==
The 35-page-book had a mixed reception due to its premise and writing, which garnered both criticism for its quality and praise for its unintentionally comedic tone. CBR called the book "a masterwork of bad erotica." Dhvani Solani of Vice criticized the novelette's writing, saying "the only place the book is going to is the Bad Sex in Fiction awards." Cassandra Stone of Scary Mommy was similarly negative, saying the book was "as insane as it sounds."

In December 2020, a sequel titled Kissing the Coronavirus 2: The Second Wave was published. Since then numerous sequels have appeared, grouped under the series title Kissing the Coronavirus Chronicles. In April 2021 episodes 1–3 appeared in the anthology Kissing the Coronavirus Chronicles plus an additional unpublished story titled Kissing the Coronavirus: The Legend of Doctor Ashingtonford.

== Kissing the Coronavirus Chronicles ==
- (2020) Kissing the Coronavirus. Episode 1. ISBN 979-8694020954.
- (2020) Kissing the Coronavirus 2: The Second Wave. Episode 2. ISBN 979-8577545635.
- (2021) Kissing the Coronavirus 3: The Mutant Strain. Episode 3. ISBN 979-8736439812.
- (2021) Kissing the Coronavirus Chronicles. Episodes 1–3 plus Kissing the Coronavirus: The Legend of Doctor Ashingtonford. ISBN 979-8737460853.
- (2021) Covid Claus is Coming to Town. Episode 4. ISBN 979-8768478889.
