= 7291 =

Spanish documentary

7291 is a television documentary directed by Juanjo Castro and scored by Jose Camacho. Set in the COVID pandemic and its casualties in Madrid, was aired on 13 March 2025 simultaneously on La 2 and Canal 24 Horas. It is named after the number of deaths without medical assistance due to regional government decision in Madrid nursing homes from March to April 2020. It includes commentaries from family victims, doctors, responsible of the residence for the elderly, etc.

Previously Castro showed the documentary to streaming services and other television channels. Isabel Díaz Ayuso, Community of Madrid president at the time, was asked for appearing on the documentary to be interviewed, but she finally refused.

The documentary got nearby 1.3 millions of viewership and 15% of share, 758.000 of spectators (8.9%) in La 2, and 520.000 spectators (6.1%) in Canal 24 Horas.
