= Gotta Get Some Tissue! =

2021 animated short film

Gotta Get Some Tissue!, also known as GGST!, is an animated short-film and music video created by, and starring Tyrone Evans Clark. The short is inspired by the COVID-19 pandemic.

== Plot ==
The Tissue Man (Tyrone Evans Clark) has a funky experience searching for his abducted tissue pal. While on the hunt for his missing buddy, he becomes submerged in a very strange mystical world populated by questionable characters such as the Tissue People, talking beasts, and others.

== Cast ==
- Tyrone Evans Clark as The Tissue Man

== Production ==
Tyrone Evans Clark wrote, directed, produced, sang, and acted in GGST!.

Rey Morano developed the logo animation from the beginning of GGST!.

Max Matiash was the movie and music video animator.

== Release ==
The film had its worldwide premiere at the 2021 Prague Independent Film Festival.

It was also featured at film festivals such as the IndieX Film Fest and the Gold Star Movie Awards, in November 2021.

It was released online in 2022.

== Reception ==
Chiang Rai Times wrote, “One of my favourite scenes is when ‘The Tissue Man’ dancing with the cartoon tissue characters.”

FilmInk wrote, “Clark knows how to take the familiarity of real life issues, but make fun of them in a comical way. A vision of us seeing the bright side of the horrible pandemic that we experienced and we shouldn't take life so seriously all the time.”

MetalSucks wrote, “The subject matter of this masterpiece is hilarious and it plays off the idea of tissue paper being misused during the season of the beginning of COVID-19.”

1883 Magazine wrote, “‘GGST!’ is uniquely different compared to the past music (Inside of Me!, Video Game, etc.) that he has created since 2019... Again the lyrics are playful and it makes a light out of people buying excessive amounts of tissue/toilet paper.”

== Accolades ==
GGST! was an official selection for the 2021 Prague Independent Film Festival and the 2021 Animaze Montreal International Film Festival. The short film was a semi-finalist in the July 2021 Indie Short Fest.

The animation was awarded a Semi-Finalist for the Best Experimental Music Video category at the 2022 Lonely Wolf Film Festival.
