= Adriana Ferrarese del Bene =

Italian opera singer (1759 – after 1803)

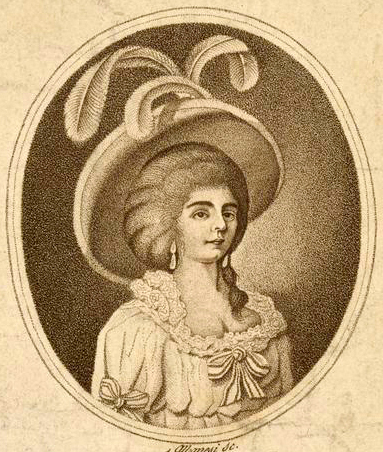
Portrait of Adriana Ferrarese del Bene, c. 1785

Adriana Ferrarese del Bene (September 19, 1759, Ferrara – after 1803) was an Italian operatic soprano. She was one of the first performers of Susanna in Mozart's Le nozze di Figaro and the first performer of Fiordiligi in Così fan tutte.

She has been known under a variety of names. The 1979 edition of the Concise Oxford Dictionary of Opera lists her as born Adriana Gabrieli and later known as La Ferrarese (presumably from the city of her birth). However, Grove Dictionary of Music and Musicians notes that her identification with a Francesca Gabrielli, detta la Ferrarese ("nicknamed the Ferrarese one"), whom Charles Burney heard in Venice in 1770, is not based on solid evidence. What is known is that she married Luigi del Bene in 1782 and performed thereafter as Adriana Ferrarese (or Ferraresi) del Bene.

Ferrarese del Bene studied in Venice and performed in London (1785–1787) before arriving in Vienna, where she made her reputation singing serious roles in opera buffa (1788–1791). The publication Rapport von Wien reported, "She has, in addition to an unbelievable high register, a striking low register and connoisseurs of music claim that in living memory no such voice has sounded within Vienna's walls."

== Performance of Mozart ==
William Mann reports Mozart had an extreme dislike for Ferrarese del Bene, for whom he first created the role of Fiordiligi in Così fan tutte. Aware of her tendency to drop her chin and throw back her head while singing low and high notes respectively, Mozart chose to fill her showpiece aria ("Come scoglio") with continuous harmonic leaps to force her to bob her head "like a chicken".
