= Covid fan tutte =

2020 comic opera

Covid fan tutte is a 2020 comic opera created and produced by the Finnish National Opera. It is a comedic adaptation of Mozart's Così fan tutte, depicting life in the spring of 2020 as disrupted by the COVID-19 pandemic. The libretto is by Minna Lindgren, written to music by Mozart. The idea for the opera was conceived by conductor Esa-Pekka Salonen and soprano Karita Mattila, after the pandemic caused the cancellation of Finnish National Opera's planned production of Wagner's Die Walküre. A filmed performance of the work was available for streaming worldwide through March 2021.

== History ==
The inception of Covid fan tutte came about when the COVID-19 pandemic caused the cancellation of Finnish National Opera's planned production of Die Walküre. The idea was conceived by conductor Esa-Pekka Salonen and soprano Karita Mattila, Finnish natives who both reside in the U.S. but flew to Finland when international borders began closing due to the pandemic, and then found themselves virtually unable to return to the U.S.

Journalist and novelist Minna Lindgren was commissioned in mid May 2020 and given a little over a month to create a libretto, which she wrote to selected music from Mozart's Così fan tutte and an aria each from Don Giovanni and The Magic Flute. Recitatives were eliminated, and Salonen composed additional musical snippets such as interludes and keyboard parts.

The completed opera premiered in Helsinki on 28 August 2020, directed by Jussi Nikkilä and conducted by Salonen, with a total of 12 performances through 23 October 2020, subtitled in English, Finnish, and Swedish. Mattila is a featured performer in the production, playing a parody of herself as an internationally renowned opera diva trapped in Finland because of the pandemic, and also singing the role of Despina.

On 6 October 2020, Finnish National Opera posted a film of the 1 September 2020 performance of the opera online, free to stream worldwide through 30 March 2021, with available subtitles in English and Finnish. On 16 October 2020 OperaVision also posted the entire opera on YouTube, with English subtitles available, for four months.

The Pacific Opera Project in California also staged their COVID-19 adaptation using the same title, Covid fan tutte, in November 2020 as a drive-in production in a parking lot.

== Roles ==
Roles, voice types, premiere cast
Role	Voice type	Premiere cast, 28 August 2020 Conductor: Esa-Pekka Salonen
Fiordiligi	soprano	Miina-Liisa Värelä / Hannakaisa Nyrönen
Dorabella	soprano	Johanna Rusanen / Jenny Carlstedt
Ferrando	tenor	Tuomas Katajala / Markus Nykänen
Guglielmo	baritone	Waltteri Torikka / Arttu Kataja
Despina	soprano	Karita Mattila / Reetta Haavisto
Don Alfonso	bass	Tommi Hakala / Nicholas Söderlund
Interface Manager	non-singing	Sanna-Kaisa Palo
Mozart	non-singing	Ylermi Rajamaa
Covid Virus	dancer	Natasha Lommi
Sign-language interpreter	silent	Outi Huusko

== Synopsis ==
The opera opens with the prelude to Act 1 of Die Walküre, which is eventually interrupted by Finnish National Opera's customer interface manager, who instructs conductor Esa-Pekka Salonen to play Mozart instead. At home, opera singers adjust to the reality of possible COVID-19 restrictions and uncertainties. Government officials try to authoritatively project an air of competence and assurance.

An opera diva rails on her phone to a friend, complaining that she is accidentally stuck in Finland, in a dreadful rented flat, when she should be jet-setting around the world singing leading roles at top venues in productions that have now all been cancelled, without pay, because of the coronavirus. She then gets a call offering her a lead role in a Finnish National Opera production.

The rest of the opera satirizes the lives of ordinary Finns; announcements and news conferences by government officials and scientists; and updates as more data emerges and lives grow more constricted and confusing because of societal, business, educational, and work changes in an atmosphere lacking in consistent clear direction from national and international authorities.
