= Così fan tutte =

1790 Italian-language opera buffa by W. A. Mozart

Così fan tutte, ossia La scuola degli amanti
- Opera by W. A. Mozart
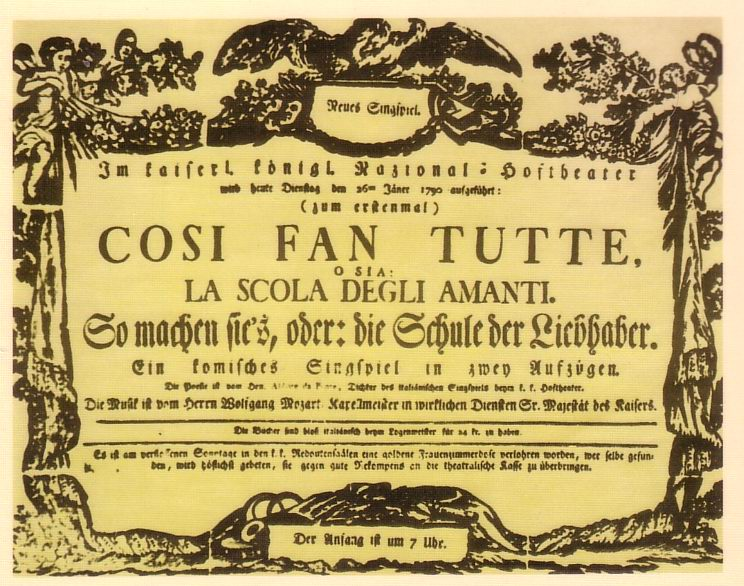
- Playbill of the first performance
- Translation: Women are like that, or The School for Lovers
- Librettist: Lorenzo Da Ponte
- Language: Italian
- Premiere: 26 January 1790; Burgtheater, Vienna

Così fan tutte, ossia La scuola degli amanti (Note: Italian pronunciation: [koˈzi ffan ˈtutte osˈsiːa la ˈskwɔːla deʎʎ aˈmanti, koˈsi -].) (Women are like that, or The School for Lovers), K. 588, is an opera buffa in two acts by Wolfgang Amadeus Mozart. It was first performed on 26 January 1790 at the Burgtheater in Vienna, Austria. The libretto was written by Lorenzo Da Ponte who also wrote Le nozze di Figaro and Don Giovanni.

Although it is commonly held that Così fan tutte was written and composed at the suggestion of the Emperor Joseph II, recent research does not support this idea. There is evidence that Mozart's contemporary Antonio Salieri tried to set the libretto but left it unfinished. In 1994, John Rice uncovered two terzetti by Salieri in the Austrian National Library.

The short title, Così fan tutte, literally means "So do they all", using the feminine plural (tutte) to indicate women. It is sometimes translated into English as "Women are like that". The words are sung by the three men in act 2, scene 3, just before the finale; this melodic phrase is also quoted in the overture to the opera. Da Ponte had used the line "Così fan tutte le belle" earlier in Le nozze di Figaro (in act 1, scene 7).

== Performance history ==
The first performance of Mozart's setting took place at the Burgtheater in Vienna on 26 January 1790. It was given only five times before the run was stopped by the death of the Emperor Joseph II and the resulting period of court mourning. It was performed twice in June 1790 with the composer conducting the second performance, and again in July (twice) and August (once). After that it was not performed in Vienna during Mozart's lifetime. The first British performance was in May 1811 at the King's Theatre, London. Così fan tutte was not performed in the United States until 1922, when it was given at the Metropolitan Opera.

According to William Mann, Mozart disliked prima donna Adriana Ferrarese del Bene, Da Ponte's arrogant mistress for whom the role of Fiordiligi had been created. Knowing her idiosyncratic tendency to drop her chin on low notes and throw back her head on high ones, Mozart filled her showpiece aria "Come scoglio" with constant leaps from low to high and high to low in order to make Ferrarese's head "bob like a chicken" onstage.

The subject matter (see synopsis below) did not offend Viennese sensibilities of the time, but in the 19th and early 20th centuries was considered overly risqué and vulgar. Beethoven is said to have been one of those who found the storyline immoral, and his opera Fidelio has been called a response to Così. Goethe wrote about Da Ponte's libretto, which he found deficient, "To be sure the over-simplicity of its subject, the weak delineation of the characters on the part of the poet, the situations' lack of truth, the feebleness of the denouement, and above all the pitiful translations have contributed much to this judgment. All the greater then were the difficulties with which the composer had to battle." (Goethe liked the music considerably more. "First one is struck by how delicately this opera is scored; how Mozart refrained from the sort of overburdening for which he has otherwise been criticized; how appropriately he has used the wind instruments. Add to that the harmony of the whole ... the grace in the individual paintings, with what tenderness every emotion is handled; the truth of expression! The plot does not suffer any strong coloration, and yet such refined nuancing of the characters.") The opera was rarely performed, and when it did appear it was done in one of several bowdlerised versions. After World War II it regained a place in the standard operatic repertoire and is now frequently performed.

A comedic adaptation, Covid fan tutte, (also using other music by Mozart) depicting life during the first several months of the COVID-19 pandemic was produced by the Finnish National Opera in 2020.

== Roles ==
Roles, voice types, premiere cast
Role	Voice type	Premiere cast, 26 January 1790 Conductor: W. A. Mozart
Fiordiligi, lady from Ferrara and sister to Dorabella, living in Naples	soprano	Adriana Ferrarese
Dorabella, lady from Ferrara and sister to Fiordiligi, living in Naples	soprano	Louise (Luisa) Villeneuve
Guglielmo (spelled "Guilelmo" by the librettist), lover of Fiordiligi, a soldier	baritone	Francesco Benucci
Ferrando, lover of Dorabella, a soldier	tenor	Vincenzo Calvesi
Despina, a maid	soprano	Dorotea Bussani
Don Alfonso, an old philosopher	bass	Francesco Bussani
Chorus: soldiers, servants, sailors

While the use of modern fach titles and voice categories for these roles has become customary, Mozart was far more general in his own descriptions of the voice types, as shown above. Occasionally these voice types are varied in performance practice. Don Alfonso is sometimes performed by baritones such as Thomas Allen, Bo Skovhus, and Thomas Hampson, and Dorabella is almost always performed by a mezzo-soprano. Despina is occasionally performed by a mezzo-soprano, such as Cecilia Bartoli, Frederica von Stade, Agnes Baltsa, Ann Murray and Ginger Costa-Jackson. Ferrando and Fiordiligi, however, can only be sung by a tenor and a soprano because of the high tessitura of their roles.

== Instrumentation ==
The instrumentation is as follows:

- Woodwinds: 2 flutes, 2 oboes, 2 clarinets, 2 bassoons. Fiordiligi's aria "Per pietà, ben mio, perdona", act 2, contains a rare instance of clarinets in B-natural (key of the aria is E major which transposes to F major for the clarinet part, explaining the use of B♮ clarinets). In most modern editions this is made into a part for A clarinets. The NMA keeps the notation for the B clarinet. There is evidence that some of the clarinet writing was intended for basset clarinet due to its low range.
- Brass: 2 horns, 2 trumpets.
- Percussion: 2 timpani – an additional military drum is used on stage.
- Strings: first violins, second violins, violas, violoncellos, double basses.
- Basso continuo in secco recitatives of harpsichord and violoncello

== Synopsis ==
Mozart and Da Ponte use the theme of "fiancée swapping", which dates back to the 13th century; notable earlier versions are found in Boccaccio's Decameron and Shakespeare's play Cymbeline. Elements from Shakespeare's The Merchant of Venice and The Taming of the Shrew are also present. Furthermore, it incorporates elements of the myth of Procris as found in Ovid's Metamorphoses, vii.

Place: Naples
Time: the 18th century

=== Act 1 ===
==== Scene 1: A coffeehouse ====
"Soave sia il vento"
The Singing Sergeants and Concert Band of the United States Air Force Band

In a cafe, Ferrando and Guglielmo (two officers) express certainty that their fiancées (Dorabella and Fiordiligi, respectively) will be eternally faithful; Don Alfonso expresses skepticism and claims that there is no such thing as a faithful woman (trios: "La mia Dorabella capace non è" and "È la fede delle femmine"). He lays a wager with the two officers, claiming he can prove in a day's time that those two, like all women, are fickle. The wager is accepted: the two officers will pretend to have been called off to war; soon thereafter they will return in disguise and each attempt to seduce the other's lover (trio: "Una bella serenata"). The scene shifts to the two women, who are praising their men (duet: "Ah guarda, sorella"—"Ah look sister"). Alfonso arrives to announce the bad news: the officers have been called off to war. Ferrando and Guglielmo arrive, brokenhearted, and bid farewell (quintet: "Sento, o Dio, che questo piede è restio"—"I feel, oh God, that my foot is reluctant"). As the boat with the men sails off to sea, Alfonso and the sisters wish them safe travel (trio: "Soave sia il vento"—"May the wind be gentle"). Alfonso, left alone, gloatingly predicts that the women (like all women) will prove unfaithful (arioso: "Oh, poverini, per femmina giocare cento zecchini?"—"Oh, poor little ones, to wager 100 sequins on a woman").

==== Scene 2: A room in the sisters' home ====
Despina, the maid, arrives and asks what is wrong. Dorabella bemoans the torment of having been left alone (aria: "Smanie implacabili"—"Torments implacable"). Despina mocks the sisters, advising them to take new lovers while their betrotheds are away (aria: "In uomini, in soldati, sperare fedeltà?"—"In men, in soldiers, you hope for faithfulness?"). After they leave, Alfonso arrives. He fears Despina will recognize the men through their disguises, so he bribes her into helping him to win the bet. The two men then arrive, dressed as mustachioed Albanians (sextet: "Alla bella Despinetta"—"Meet the pretty Despinetta"). The sisters enter and are alarmed by the presence of strange men in their home. The "Albanians" tell the sisters that they were led by love to them (the sisters). However, the sisters refuse to give in. Fiordiligi asks the "Albanians" to leave and pledges to remain faithful (aria: "Come scoglio"—"Like a rock"). The "Albanians" continue the attempt to win over the sisters' hearts, Guglielmo going so far as to point out all of his manly attributes (aria: "Non siate ritrosi"—"Don't be shy"), (Note: Originally, Mozart wrote "Rivolgete a lui lo sguardo", K. 584, for Così, but replaced it for dramatic reason with the lighter and shorter "Non siate ritrosi".) but to no avail. Ferrando, left alone and sensing victory, praises his love (aria: "Un'aura amorosa"—"A loving breath").

==== Scene 3: A garden ====
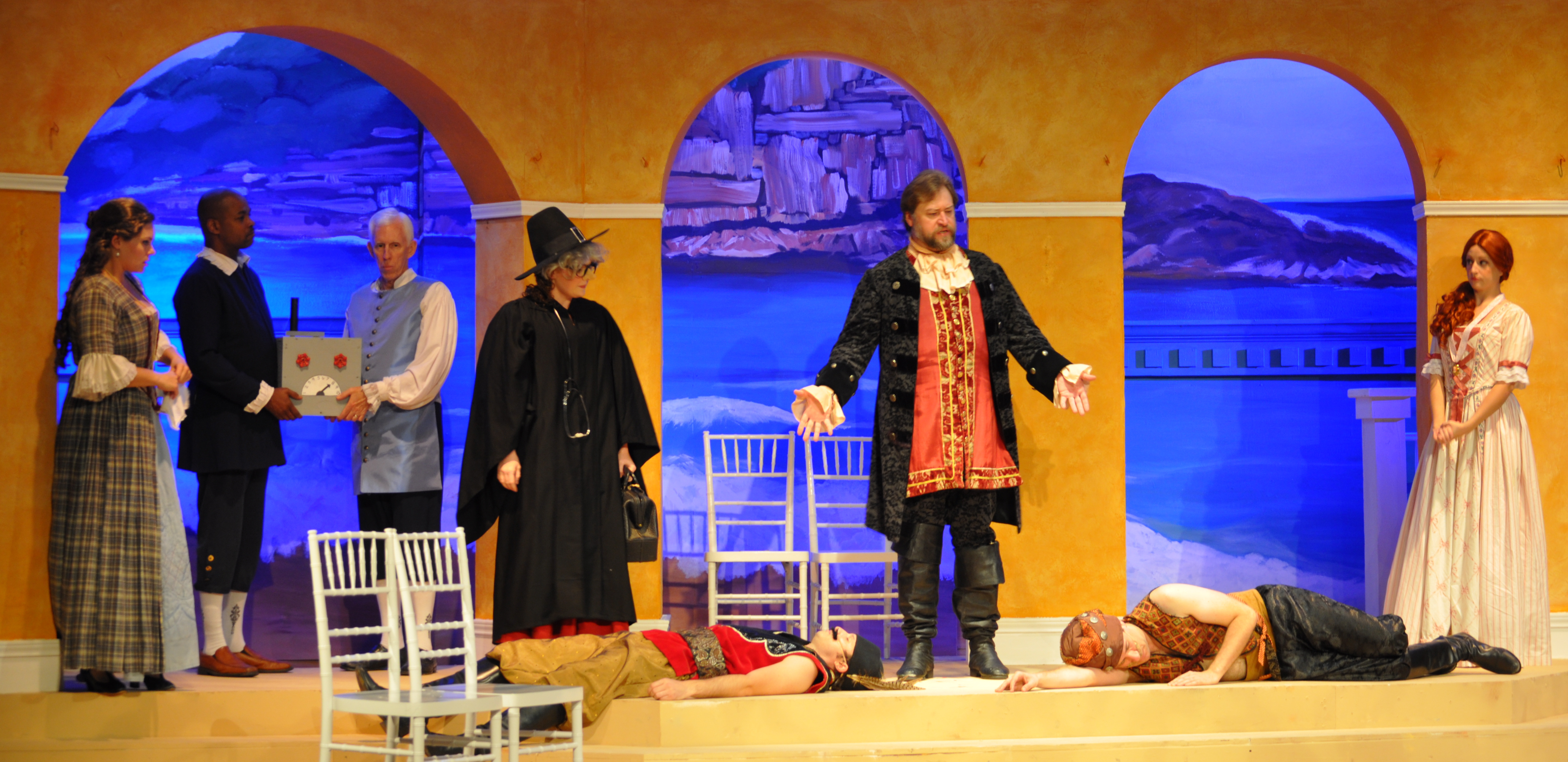
Opera in the Heights ensemble, 2011

The sisters are still pining. Despina has asked Don Alfonso to let her take over the seduction plan. Suddenly, the "Albanians" burst in the scene and threaten to poison themselves if they are not allowed the chance to woo the sisters. As Alfonso tries to calm them, they drink the "poison" and pretend to pass out. Soon thereafter, a "doctor" (Despina in disguise) arrives on the scene and, using magnet therapy, is able to revive the "Albanians". The men, pretending to hallucinate, demand a kiss from Dorabella and Fiordiligi (whom the "Albanians" call goddesses) who stand before them. The sisters refuse, even as Alfonso and the doctor (Despina) urge them to acquiesce.

=== Act 2 ===
==== Scene 1: The sisters' bedroom ====
"Una donna a quindici anni"
From Musopen

Despina urges them to succumb to the "Albanians'" overtures (aria: "Una donna a quindici anni"—"A fifteen year old woman"). After she leaves, Dorabella confesses to Fiordiligi that she is tempted, and the two agree that a mere flirtation will do no harm and will help them pass the time while they wait for their lovers to return (duet: "Prenderò quel brunettino"—"I will take the dark haired one").

==== Scene 2: The garden ====
Dorabella and the disguised Guglielmo pair off, as do Ferrando and Fiordiligi. The conversation is halting and uncomfortable, and Ferrando departs with Fiordiligi. Now alone with Dorabella, Guglielmo attempts to woo her. She puts up a token resistance, and soon she has given him a medallion (with Ferrando's portrait inside) in exchange for a heart-shaped locket (duet: "Il core vi dono"—"I give you my heart"). Ferrando is less successful with Fiordiligi (Ferrando's aria: "Ah, lo veggio"—"Ah, I see it" and Fiordiligi's aria: "Per pietà, ben mio, perdona"—"Please, my beloved, forgive"), so he is enraged when he later finds out from Guglielmo that the medallion with his portrait has been so quickly given away to a new lover. Guglielmo at first sympathises with Ferrando (aria: "Donne mie, la fate a tanti"—"My ladies, you do it to so many"), but then gloats, because his betrothed is faithful.

==== Scene 3: The sisters' room ====
Dorabella admits her indiscretion to Fiordiligi ("È amore un ladroncello"—"Love is a little thief"). Fiordiligi, upset by this development, decides to go to the army and find her betrothed. Before she can leave, though, Ferrando arrives and continues his attempted seduction. Fiordiligi finally succumbs and falls into his arms (duet: "Fra gli amplessi"—"In the embraces"). Guglielmo is distraught while Ferrando turns Guglielmo's earlier gloating back on him. Alfonso, winner of the wager, tells the men to forgive their fiancées. After all: "Così fan tutte"—"All women are like that".

==== Scene 4 ====
The scene begins as a double wedding for the sisters and their "Albanian" grooms. Despina, in disguise as a notary, presents the marriage contract, which only the ladies sign. (The men, of course, realise that this wedding is a sham, and are only playing along with it in order to teach their unfaithful lovers a lesson.) Directly thereafter, military music is heard in the distance, indicating the return of the officers. Alfonso confirms the sisters' fears: Ferrando and Guglielmo are on their way to the house. The "Albanians" hurry off to hide (actually, to change out of their disguises). They return as the officers, professing their love. Alfonso drops the marriage contract in front of the officers, and, when they read it, they become enraged. They then depart and return moments later, half in Albanian disguise, half as officers. Despina has been revealed to be the notary, and the sisters realize they have been duped. All is ultimately forgiven, as the entire group praises the ability to accept life's unavoidable good times and bad times.

== See also ==
- List of operas by Mozart
- Coronation Mass in C major (Così fan tutte pasticcio), setting of the Mass using reworked music from Così fan tutte
- Così, a 1992 play by Louis Nowra, based on the staging of Così fan tutte in a psychiatric hospital
