= Senses of Cinema =

Quarterly online film magazine founded in 1999

- Website type: Online film magazine
- Available in: English
- Owner: Senses of Cinema Inc.
- Creator: Bill Mousoulis (founding editor)
- Website: sensesofcinema.com
- Launched: 1999
- Current status: Active
- ISSN: 1443-4059

Senses of Cinema is a quarterly online film magazine founded in 1999 by filmmaker Bill Mousoulis. Based in Melbourne, Australia, Senses of Cinema publishes work by film critics from all over the world, including critical essays, career overviews of the works of key directors, and coverage of many international festivals.

Its contributors have included Raphaël Bassan, Salvador Carrasco, Barbara Creed, Wheeler Winston Dixon, David Ehrenstein, Thomas Elsaesser, Valie Export, Gwendolyn Audrey Foster, Dušan Makavejev, Edgar Morin, Joseph Natoli, Murray Pomerance, Berenice Reynaud, Jonathan Rosenbaum, David Sanjek, Sally Shafto, David Sterritt, Robert Dassanowsky, and Viviane Vagh.

The magazine's current editors are Nace Zavrl, Leonardo Goi, Abel Muñoz-Hénonin, Fiona Villella, and Alex Williams.

== Format ==
Every issue of Senses of Cinema follows roughly the same format: about a dozen "featured articles," often related to a unifying theme, a special dossier often devoted to some aspect of Australian cinema, reports from various major international, regional and underground film festivals, book reviews, and articles devoted to recent screenings and retrospectives at the Melbourne Cinematheque.

Senses of Cinema regularly publishes interviews in its featured articles section.

=== Great directors ===
Senses of Cinema maintains a database of career overview essays on "great directors." The essays range in scope and length, but they all maintain an auteurist perspective on the filmmakers' work.

== See also ==
- Bright Lights Film Journal
- The Moving Arts Film Journal
