= Antonio Palomba =

Italian opera librettist, poet, and harpsichordist

Antonio Palomba (20 December 1705 – 1769) was an Italian opera librettist, poet, harpsichordist, and music educator. He also worked as a notary.

== Biography ==
Antonio Palomba was born in Naples on 20 December 1705. He apprenticed as a notary under Pietro Trinchera in 1736-1737.

He became a teacher of the harpsichord at the Teatro della Pace in 1749. Most of his more than 50 opera libretti were comedic works written for composers of the Neapolitan school. He also wrote some works for performance in Florence, Bologna and abroad. He died in Naples in 1769; one of the victims of a fever epidemic in the city. Many of his libretti were set more than once to music, and composers continued to use his libretti up into the 1830s.

There is some confusion about whether these libretti were written by Antonio Palomba or his nephew Giuseppe Palomba, also a librettist, who died in 1825. Articles on both men are available on it.wikipedia.org.

== Operas using libretti by Palomba ==
=== 1730-1739 ===
- Li dispiette amoruse (Autumn 1731, Teatro Nuovo, Naples, Michele Gabellone)
- Lo creduto infedele (1735, Naples, Nicola Bonifacio Logroscino)
- Il Carlo (1736, Naples, Matteo Capranica)
- La Camilla (1737, Naples, Ignazio Prota)
- L'errore amoroso (1737, Naples, Niccolò Jommelli)
- Il Marchese Sgrana (1738, Naples, Pietro Auletta)
- La Matilde (Winter 1739, Teatro dei Fiorentini, Naples, Gioacchino Cocchi)

=== 1740-1749 ===
- Gl'intrichi delle cantarine (Carnival 1740, Teatro dei Fiorentini, Naples, Domènech Terradellas)
- Li travestimenti amorosi (10 July 1740, Teatro del Palazzo Reale di Napoli, Naples, Davide Perez)
- L'Origille (8 December 1740, Teatro Nuovo, Naples, Antonio Palella)
- Il trionfo del valore (1741, Teatro Nuovo, Naples, Nicola Porpora)
- La violante (1741, Naples, Nicola Bonifacio Logroscino; after L'amor costante by Pietro Auletta)
- Le due zingare simili (1742, Naples, Girolamo Abos)
- Il geloso (1743, Naples, Girolamo Abos)
- Il giramondo (Spring of 1743, Florence, Teatro di Via del Cocomero, Leonardo Leo)
- Don Saverio (Spring of 1744, Venice, Giuseppe Avossa)
- La fedeltà odiata (Spring of 1744, Teatro dei Fiorentini, Naples, Leonardo Leo)
- L'amante tradito (Summer of 1744, Brescia, music by various composers)
- L'Elisa (Fall of 1744, Teatro dei Fiorentini, Naples, Gioacchino Cocchi)
- L'amore ingegnoso (1745, Naples, Vincenzo Legrenzio Ciampi)
- La moglie gelosa (1745, Naples, Girolamo Abos)
- L'Eugenia (1745, Naples, Matteo Capranica)
- L'errore amoroso (Carnival 1745, Teatro S. Lucia, Palermo, Davide Pérez)
- La maestra (Carnival 1747, Teatro Nuovo, Naples, Gioacchino Cocchi)
- La Faustina (Carnival 1747, Naples, Geronimo Cordella)
- La mogliere traduta (Spring of 1747, Teatro della Pace, Naples, Nicola Calandro)
- Il barone di Vignalomba (1747, Teatro Nuovo, Naples, Gaetano Latilla)
- La Costanza (1747, Naples, Nicola Bonifacio Logroscino)
- Li despiette d'ammore (1748, Naples, Acts 1 and 2 by Nicola Bonifacio Logroscino, Act 3 by Nicola Calandro)
- L'amore in maschera (1748, Naples, Niccolò Jommelli)
- Lo chiacchiarone (1748, Naples, Pietro Comes)
- La scuola moderna o sia la maestra di buon gusto (Fall 1748, Venice, revised version of La maestra, Gioacchino Cocchi)
- Monsieur Petitone (1749, Teatro Nuovo, Naples, Antonio Corbisiero)
- La serva bacchettona (Spring 1749, Teatro dei Fiorentini, Naples, Gioacchino Cocchi)
- La Celia (Autumn 1749, Teatro dei Fiorentini, Naples, Gaetano Latilla)

=== 1750-1759 ===
- L'amor comico (1750, Naples, Giuseppe Sellitto)
- La Gismonda (Spring 1750, Teatro dei Fiorentini, Naples, Gioacchino Cocchi)
- Bernardone (Carnival 1750, Teatro privato Valguarner, Palermo, Gioacchino Cocchi)
- Il chimico (23 September 1750, Teatro de Santa Creu, Barcelona, Giuseppe Scolari)
- Il gioco de' matti (Autumn 1750, Teatro dei Fiorentini, Naples, Gaetano Latilla)
- La villana nobile (1751, Palermo, Niccolò Jommelli)
- Amore figlio del piacere (1751, Naples, Nicola Bonifacio Logroscino and Giuseppe Ventura)
- La Griselda (1752, Naples, Nicola Bonifacio Logroscino)
- Gl'inganni per amore (1752, Naples, Teatro dei Fiorentini, Nicola Conforto)
- L'Orazio (19 September 1752, Académie Royale de Musique, Paris, Pietro Auletta)
- La Costanza (Winter 1752, Teatro dei Fiorentini, Naples, Tommaso Traetta)
- L'Olindo (1753, Teatro dei Fiorentini, Naples, Niccolò Conti and Matteo Capranica)
- La schiava amante (1753, Naples, Matteo Capranica)
- La clemenza di Tito (3 January 1753, Teatro Formagliari, Bologna, Michelangelo Valentini)
- La scaltra governatrice (25 January 1753, Académie Royale de Musique, Paris, final revision of La maestra, Gioacchino Cocchi)
- La serva astuta (Spring 1753, Teatro dei Fiorentini, Naples, Gioacchino Cocchi and Pasquale Errichelli)
- Il finto turco (Winter 1753, Teatro dei Fiorentini, Naples, Gioacchino Cocchi and Pasquale Errichelli)
- La commediante (Carnival 1754, Teatro dei Fiorentini, Naples, Nicola Conforto)
- Le donne dispettose (or: Le trame per amore; La massara spiritosa) (Autumn 1754, Teatro dei Fiorentini, Naples, Niccolò Piccinni)
- L'amore alla moda (1755, Naples, Giuseppe Sellitto)
- La Rosmonda (1755, Naples, Tommaso Traetta, Nicola Bonifacio Logroscino, and Carlo Cecere)
- La madamigella (1755, Naples, possibly Giuseppe Scarlatti)
- Il curioso del suo proprio danno (Carnival 1755 or 1756, Teatro Nuovo, Naples, Niccolò Piccinni)
- La fante furba (Autumn 1756, Teatro Nuovo, Naples, Tommaso Traetta)
- Il chimico (1757, Venice, Vincenzo Legrenzio Ciampi)
- La clemenza di Tito (1757, Venice, Vincenzo Legrenzio Ciampi)
- La fante di buon gusto (1758, Naples, Nicola Bonifacio Logroscino)
- Madama Arrighetta (or Monsieur Petitone) (Autumn 1758, Teatro Nuovo, Naples, Niccolò Piccinni)
- La scaltra letterata (Winter 1758, Teatro Nuovo, Naples, Niccolò Piccinni)
- La ricca locandiera (Carnival 1759, Teatro Capranica, Rome, Pietro Alessandro Guglielmi)
- Il finto pastorello (1759, Teatro Nuovo, Naples, Vincenzo Orgitano)

=== 1760-1769 ===
- L'Origille (Spring 1760, Teatro dei Fiorentini, Naples, Niccolò Piccinni)
- I due soldati (Winter 1760, Teatro Nuovo, Naples, Pietro Alessandro Guglielmi)
- Il curioso imprudente (Autumn 1761, Teatro dei Fiorentini, Naples, Niccolò Piccinni)
- La furba burlata (Summer 1762, Teatro Nuovo, Naples, Giacomo Insanguine)
- La donna di tutti i caratteri (Autumn 1762, Teatro dei Fiorentini, Naples, Pietro Alessandro Guglielmi)
- Il cavalier parigino (Winter 1762, Naples, Niccolo Piccinni)
- Lo sposo di tre e marito di nessuna, 1763, Teatro Nuovo, Naples, Pasquale Anfossi and Pietro Alessandro Guglielmi
- Monsieur Petitone (Spring 1763 Neapel, Teatro Nuovo, Naples, Giacomo Insanguine)
- La giocatrice bizzarra (Spring 1764, Naples, Gaspare Gabellone and Giacomo Insanguine)
- La donna vana (November 1764, Teatro dei Fiorentini, Naples, Niccolò Piccinni)
- Il ciarlone (1765, Milan, Giuseppe Scolari)
- Madama l'umorista o Gli stravaganti (26 January 1765, Teatro Rangoni, Modena, Giovanni Paisiello)
- La vedova capricciosa (Carnival 1765, Teatro Nuovo, Naples, Giacomo Antonio Insanguine) *L'incostante; (or: Il volubile; La capricciosa) (February 1766, Teatro Capranica, Rome, Niccolò Piccinni)
- Le quattro malmaritate (Carnival 1766, Teatro Nuovo, Naples, Giacomo Antonio Insanguine)
- Lo spirito di contradizione (Carnival 1766, Teatro San Moisè, Venice, Pietro Alessandro Guglielmi)
- I matrimoni per dispetto (1767, Teatro Nuovo, Naples, Pasquale Anfossi)
- Monsieur Petiton (1768, Großwardein, Carl Ditters von Dittersdorf)

=== 1770-1799 ===
- Il maestro di cappella (31 December 1771, Burgtheater, Vienna, Florian Johann Deller)
- La donna di tutti caratteri (January 1775, Teatro Nuovo, Naples, Domenico Cimarosa)
- La locandiera strega (Carnival 1778, Cosenza, Giacomo Antonio Insanguine)
- I vecchi burlati (27 March 1783, King's Theatre, London, Pasquale Anfossi)
- Gli sposi in commedia (1784, Teatro Ducale, Piacenza, Pasquale Anfossi)
- La grotta do Trofonio (spring 1785, Teatro dei Fiorentini, Naples, Giovanni Paisiello)
- I zingari in fiera (21 November 1789, Teatro del Fondo, Naples, Giovanni Paisiello)
- Le gare generose (spring 1786, Teatro dei Fiorentini, Naples, Giovanni Paisiello)
- Il fanatico per gli antichi romani (1792, Padua, Antonio Calegari)
- L'inganno felice (Winter 1798, Neapel, Teatro del Fondo, Naples, Giovanni Paisiello)

=== 1800-1839 ===
- Griselda (Carnival 1800, Teatro Santa Cecilia, Palermo, Valentino Fioravanti)
- Il maestro di cappella (March 1818, Teatro Nuovo, Triest, Vincenzo Pucitta)
- I due furbi (1835, Naples, Giacomo Cordella)
- I vecchi burlati (Carnival 1839, Teatro Fenaroli, Chieti, Valentino Fioravanti)

== Sources ==
- Casaglia, Gherardo (2005). "Antonio Palomba". L'Almanacco di Gherardo Casaglia (in Italian).
- Cocchi, Gioacchino at operone.de
- Antonio Palomba at operone.de
