= List of operas by Gaetano Latilla =

This is a list of operas by Gaetano Latilla (1711–1788).

== List ==
Title	Genre	Subdivisions	Libretto	Première date	Place, theatre
Li mariti a forza	opera buffa	3 acts	Bernardo Saddumene	spring 1732	Naples, Teatro dei Fiorentini
L'Ottavio	commedia per musica	3 acts	Gennaro Antonio Federico	winter 1733	Naples, Teatro dei Fiorentini
Gl'ingannati	commedia per musica	3 acts	Gennaro Antonio Federico	winter 1734	Naples, Teatro dei Fiorentini
Angelica ed Orlando	commedia per musica	3 acts	Francesco Antonio Tullio after Ludovico Ariosto	autumn 1735	Naples, Teatro dei Fiorentini
Lo sposo senza moglie (I due supposti conti)	commedia per musica	3 acts	Carlo di Palma	autumn 1736	Naples, Nuovo
Temistocle	dramma per musica	3 acts	Metastasio	carnival 1737	Rome, Tor di Nona
Gismondo	commedia per musica	3 acts	Gennaro Antonio Federico	summer 1737	Naples, Teatro dei Fiorentini
La finta cameriera (revised version of Gismondo)	commedia per musica	3 acts	Giovanni Gualtiero Barlocci	spring 1738	Rome, Valle
Demofoonte	dramma per musica	3 acts	Metastasio	carnival 1738	Venice, San Giovanni Grisostomo
Polipodio e Rocchetta	intermezzo	2 acts		carnival 1738	Rome, Argentina
Madama Ciana	commedia per musica	3 acts	Giovanni Gualtiero Barlocci	February 1738	Rome, Pallacorda
Romolo	dramma per musica	3 acts		carnival 1739	Rome, Dame
Siroe	dramma per musica	3 acts	Metastasio	carnival 1740	Rome, Dame
Olimpia nell'isola in Ebuda	dramma per musica	3 acts	Andrea Trabucco	20 January 1741	Naples, San Carlo
La vendetta generosa	commedia per musica	3 acts		autumn 1742	Naples, Teatro dei Fiorentini
Zenobia	dramma per musica	3 acts	Metastasio	autumn 1742	Turin, Regio
La gara per la gloria	divertimento teatrale	3 acts	Bartolomeo Vitturi	carnival 1744	Venice, Teatro San Moisè
Amare e fingere	commedia per musica	3 acts		carnival 1745	Naples, Nuovo
Il concerto	commedia per musica	3 acts	Pietro Trinchera	spring 1746	Naples, Nuovo
Catone in Utica	dramma per musica	3 acts	Metastasio	carnival 1747	Rome, Teatro Capranica
Il vecchio amante	opera buffa	3 acts	Giovanni Gualtiero Barlocci	carnival 1747	Turin, Carignano
Adriano in Siria	dramma per musica	3 acts	Metastasio	19 December 1747	Naples, San Carlo
Il barone di Vignalomba	commedia per musica	3 acts	Antonio Palomba	1747	Naples, Nuovo
Ciascheduno ha il suo negozio	commedia per musica			1747	Madrid, Buen Retiro
La Celia	commedia per musica	3 acts	Antonio Palomba	autumn 1749	Naples, Teatro dei Fiorentini
La vecchia mmaretata	commeddja		Pietro Trinchera	carnival 1750	Naples, Pace
Amore in Tarantola	commedia per musica	3 acts	Abate Vaccina	autumn 1750	Venice, Teatro San Moisè
Il giuoco de' matti	commedia per musica	3 acts	Antonio Palomba	autumn 1750	Naples, Nuovo
La maestra	commedia per musica	3 acts	Antonio Palomba	carnival 1751	Naples, Teatro dei Fiorentini
L'opera in prova alla moda	dramma giocoso	3 acts	Giovanni Fiorini	carnival 1751	Venice, San Moisè
La pastorella al soglio	dramma per musica	3 acts	Giovanni Carlo Pagani	ascension 1751	Venice, San Moisè
Griselda	dramma per musica	3 acts	Apostolo Zeno	autumn 1751	Venice, San Cassiano
Gl'impostori	dramma giocoso	3 acts		autumn 1751	Venice, San Moisè
L'isola d'amore	commedia per musica	3 acts	Antonio Rigo	carnival 1752	Venice, San Moisè
Olimpiade	dramma per musica	3 acts	Metastasio	autumn 1752	Venice, San Cassiano
Alessandro nell'Indie	dramma per musica	3 acts	Metastasio	carnival 1753	Venice, San Cassiano
Antigona	dramma per musica	3 acts	Gaetano Roccaforte	1753	Modena, Corte
Il protettor del poeta	intermezzo	2 acts	Gaetano Piccinelli	carnival 1754	Rome, Valle
Venceslao	dramma per musica	3? acts	Apostolo Zeno	1754	Barcelona
Tito Manlio	dramma per musica	3 acts	Gaetano Roccaforte	carnival 1755	Rome, Teatro Capranica
La finta sposa	dramma giocoso	3 acts		1755	Bologna, Formagliari
Ezio	dramma per musica	3 acts	Metastasio	10 July 1758	Naples, San Carlo
L'amore artigiano	dramma giocoso	3 acts	Carlo Goldoni	carnival, 1761	Venice, San Angelo
Merope	dramma per musica	3 acts	Apostolo Zeno	carnival 1763	Venice, San Benedetto
La buona figliuola supposta vedova	dramma comica per musica	3 acts	Antonio Bianchi	carnival 1766	Venice, San Cassiano
Gl'inganni amorosi	commedia per musica	3 acts	Pasquale Mililotti	carnival 1774	Naples, Teatro dei Fiorentini
Il maritato fra le disgrazie	dramma giocoso		Giuseppe Palomba	autumn 1774	Naples, Teatro dei Fiorentini
Antigono	dramma per musica		Metastasio	13 August 1775	Naples, San Carlo
I sposi incognito	commedia per musica		Pasquale Mililotti	1779	Naples, Nuovo
