= Tommaso Mariani =

Tommaso Mariani (flourished 1728–1739) was an Italian librettist active in Naples who penned the texts to one opera seria and many comic operas and intermezzi. His nickname, "romano", suggests that he may have been born in Rome. This is further bolstered by the topics and settings of the majority of his operas, which unlike his contemporary Neapolitan writers, moved away from stories about Naples and its citizens. More than half of his comedies are set in other Italian cities such as Rome, Pistoia, Pisa, and Antignano. However, according to Pietro Napoli Signorelli, Mariani was educated in Naples.

The libretto for Mariani's 1730 comic opera, L’impresario di teatro, states that he was impresario of the Teatro Nuovo at that time. His most successful work was the intermezzo La contadina astuta (1734, now more well known as Livietta e Tracollo) with music by Giovanni Battista Pergolesi. This work was widely performed throughout Europe from the time of its premiere until 1757. However, critical assessment of Mariani's works consider his best comedic libretto Il baron della Trocciola (1736); a work based on Molière’s 1668 play George Dandin ou le Mari confondu. His only opera seria, Il castello d’Atlante, was based on the epic poem Orlando Furioso by Ludovico Ariosto and premiered at the Teatro San Bartolomeo in 1734 with a cast led by Italian prima donna Maria Giustina Turcotti in the role of Alcina.

== Opera libretti ==
- Lo cecisbeo coffeato (1728, composer Costantino Roberto)
- La pastorella commattuta (1728, composer Leonardo Leo)
- Lo matremmoneio pe’ mennetta (1729, composer Francesco Araja)
- La schiava per amore (1729, composer Leonardo Leo)
- L’impresario di teatro (1730, unknown composer)
- Lo ggeluso chiaruto (1731, composer Francesco Speltra)
- Il castello d’Atlante (1734, unknown main composer but includes interludes by composer Francesco Feo)
- La contadina astuta (1734, composer Giovanni Battista Pergolesi)
- La franchezza delle donne (1734, composer Giuseppe Sellitti)
- Chi dell’altrui si veste presto si spoglia (1734, composer Antonio Aurisicchio)
- Gl’amanti generosi (1735, composer Domenico Sarro)
- Il finto pazzo per amore (1735, composer Giuseppe Sellitti)
- La vedova ingegnosa (1735, composer Ignazio Prota)
- La maga per vendetta, e per amore (1735)
- Il baron della Trocciola (1736, composer Domenico Fischietti)
- Fingere per godere (1736, composer Domenico Sarro)
- L’inganno felice (1739, composer Nicola Logroscino)
