= Caterina Aschieri =

Italian soprano

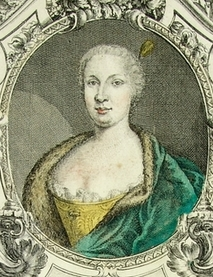
- Born: 1715; Rome
- Occupation: Opera singer

Caterina Aschieri (c. 1710 – after 1757), also known as La Romanina, was an Italian opera singer. A soprano, she premiered a number of roles in the operas of Christoph Willibald Gluck.

Caterina Aschieri was born in Rome around 1710. From 1735 to 1736, she performed in a number of comic opera at the Teatro dei Fiorentini in Naples: Gli amanti generosi by Domenico Sarro, Angelica e Orlando by Gaetano Latilla, Il finto pazzo per amore and I due baroni by Giuseppe Sellitti, and Il barone de la Trocciola by Giovanni Fischietti. In July 1736, she, her brother, mother, and sister were exiled from the Kingdom of the Two Sicilies, possibly for reasons related to sexual morality.

At Carnival in 1737, she performed as seconda donna in opera seria in Parma. The next year, she was prima donna in Carnival at Milan and returned for six more seasons. She performed in numerous opera at the Teatro Regio Ducale, including the premieres of a number of works by Gluck: Artaxerxes (1741), Demofoonte (1742), La Sofonisba (1744), and Ippolito (1745). Marcantonio Dal Re produced an engraving of Aschieri in her role as Arsione in Ippolito. In Venice, she starred in the premieres of Artamene (1740) by Tomaso Albinoni, Berenice (1741) by Baldassare Galuppi, Arsace (1743) by Gluck, and others.

A 1744 letter by Jean-Jacques Rosseau praises a performance by a singer who has been identified as Aschieri.

Caterina Aschieri left the stage in 1757. Her date of death is unknown.
