= Adriano in Siria (Metastasio) =

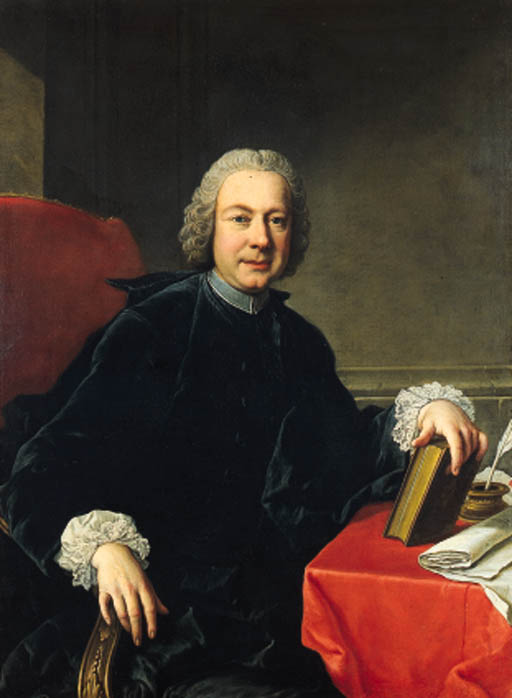
Metastasio by Batoni

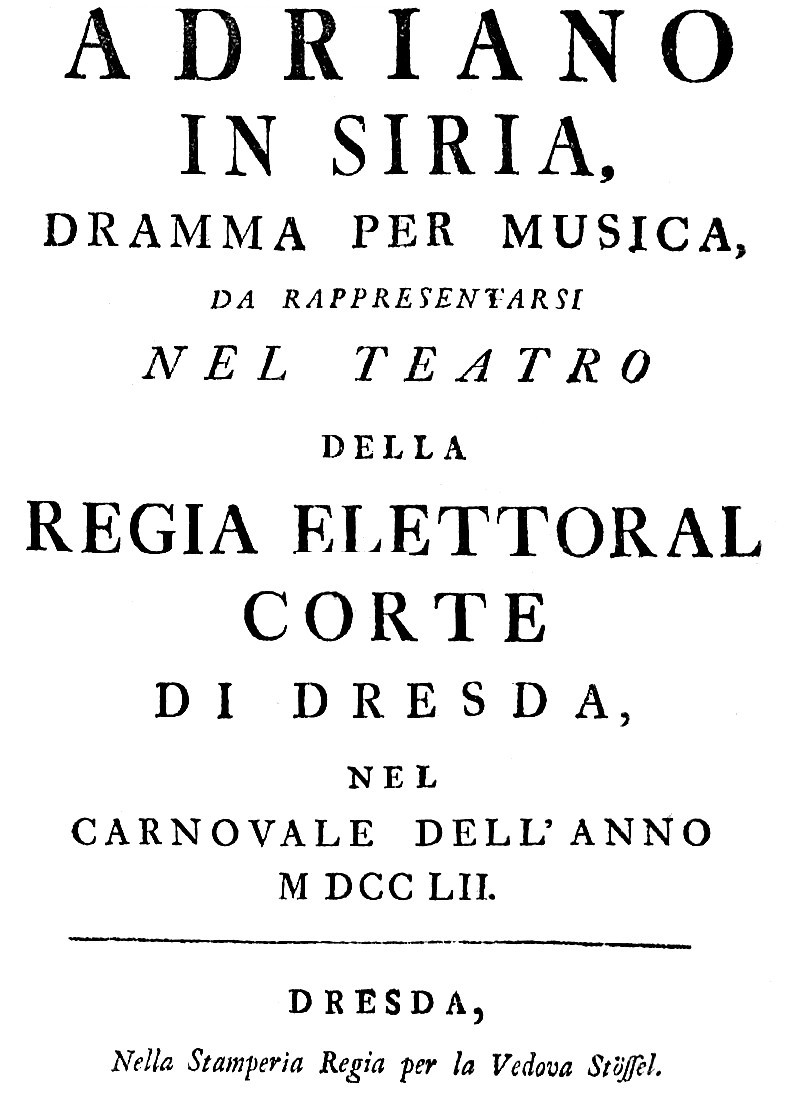
Title page of a 1752 version of the libretto, for the performance in Dresden of the Johann Adolph Hasse opera

Adriano in Siria (Hadrian in Syria) is a libretto by Italian poet Metastasio first performed, with music by Antonio Caldara, in Vienna in 1732, and turned into an opera by more than 60 other composers during the next century. Metastasio based the background of the story on late Classical works by Cassius Dio (Book 19 of the Roman History) and Elio Sparziano (Vita Hadriani Caesaris).

The aria Che fa il mio bene? also known as L'amante impaziente, sung by the character Emirena, was set to music by Ludwig van Beethoven in his Opus 82: 4 Arietten und ein Duett.

== Performances ==
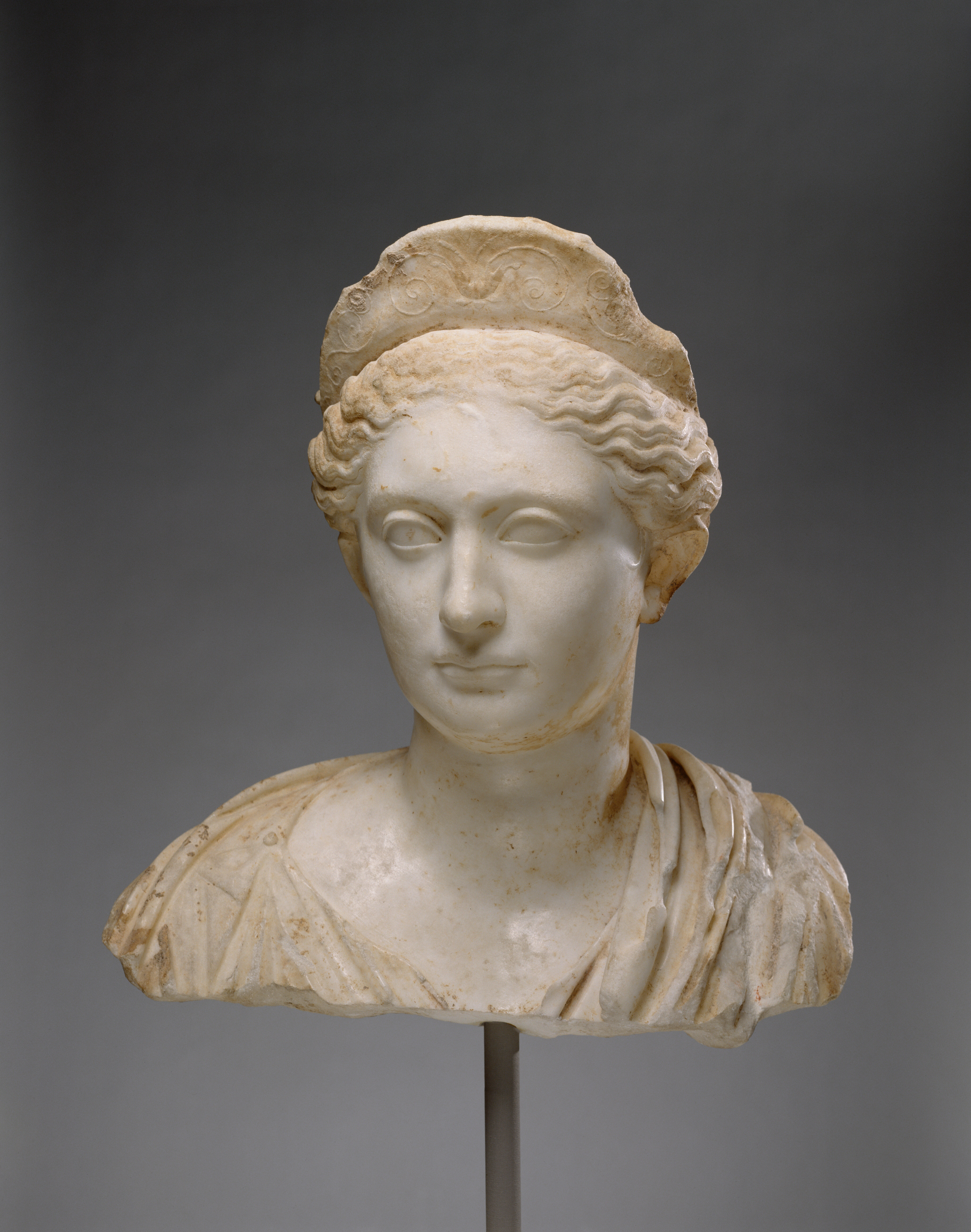
Bust of Sabina (Collection of the Getty Villa, Los Angeles)

The libretto was composed for Charles VI, Holy Roman Emperor and premiered in the Theater am Kärntnertor in Vienna on 4 November 1732. The scenes were designed by Antonio Galli da Bibiena (1697–1774). A revised version was first performed in 1733, with music by Giacomelli.

Some of the later operas based on this libretto were also created for royal festivities: the version by Pergolesi was intended for the birthday of Elisabeth Farnese, the Queen of Spain, and premiered at the Teatro San Bartolomeo in Naples on 25 October 1734, with the castrato Caffarelli singing the part of Farnaspe, which was radically altered from the first version of just two years earlier. In the yet again altered version of 1735 by Francesco Maria Veracini, written for the short-lived but ambitious Opera of the Nobility in London, the same role was sung by Farinelli, joined in an all-star cast by Senesino, Francesca Cuzzoni and Antonio Montagnana (Burden 2007, 31). George Frederic Handel was present at the premiere in Haymarket Theatre. Charles Jennens liked the opera and ordered a score; Lord Hervey, not known for his musical perception, and Henry Liddell, 1st Baron Ravensworth were bored (Dean 2006, 278–79; Van Til 2007, 121). However, the work enjoyed a run of twenty performances over six months (Helyard 2000).

In 1768–69, Ignaz Holzbauer also composed an opera based on the libretto by Metastasio, this time to be performed at the royal wedding between Amalie of Zweibrücken-Birkenfeld and Frederick Augustus I of Saxony on 29 January 1769. The 1765 version by Johann Christian Bach, while not especially created for a royal occasion, was even visited twice by George III of the United Kingdom and his wife Charlotte of Mecklenburg-Strelitz when it was performed in London in 1765.

As a royalist or even imperialist opera, it was badly received by Republicans and revolutionaries. In 1792, Étienne Méhul had finished his version Adrien with a libretto by François-Benoît Hoffman based on Metastasio; it was set to premier at the Paris Opera on 6 March 1792, but the Commune opposed it, as the opera was written by an Austrian (Anti-Austrian sentiments were running high at the time and France would declare war on Austria the next month), and the theme was imperialistic, which went against the ideals of the French Revolution. The premier was postponed for a week, and Hoffman defended his work in an open letter, but to no avail, as the work was banned on 12 March 1792. It finally premiered in 1799, but was again shut down by the Directory after four performances.

== Roles ==
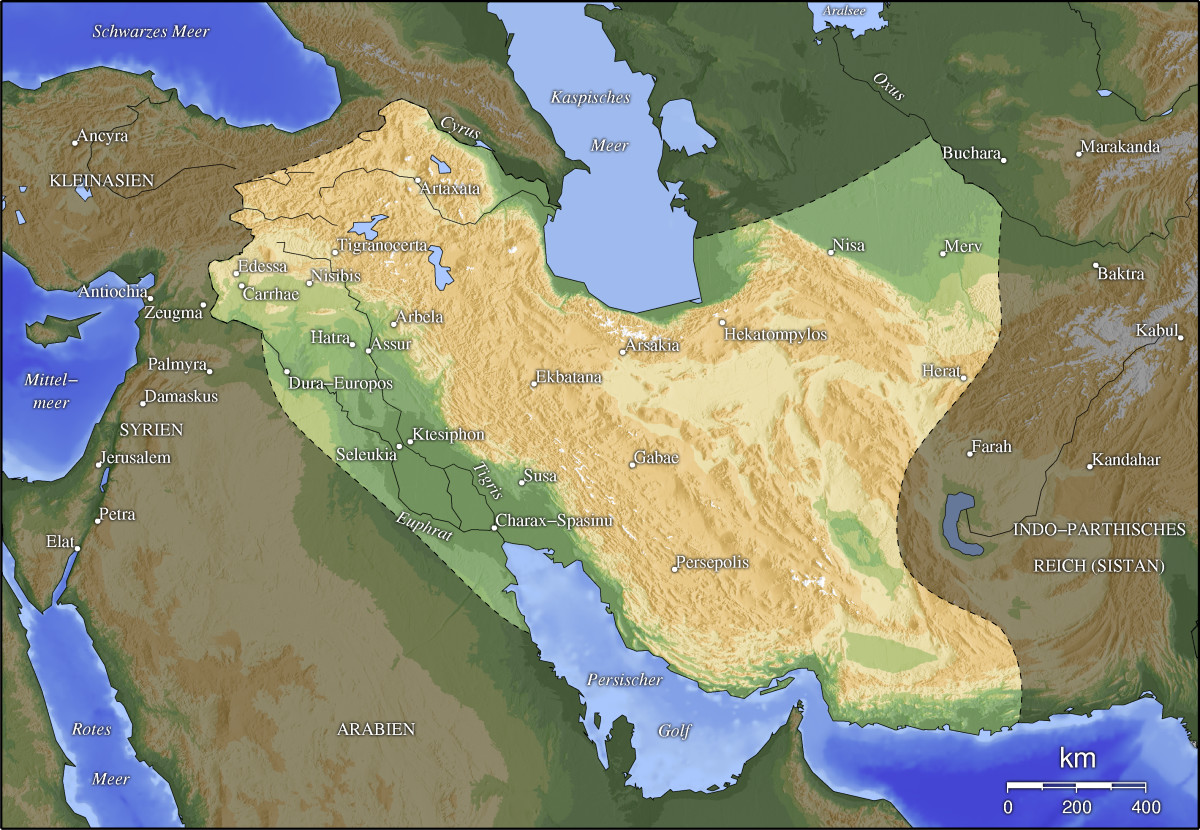
Parthian Empire

- Adriano: Emperor of Rome, in love with Emirena
- Emirena: prisoner of Adriano, in love with Farnaspe
- Farnaspe: friend of Osroa and prince of the Parths, in love with and betrothed to Emirena
- Osroa: King of the Parthian Empire, father of Emirena
- Sabina: in love with and betrothed to Adriano
- Aquilio: tribune, friend of Adriano and secretly in love with Sabina

== Synopsis ==
Set in Antioch against the historic background of the early reign of the Roman Emperor Hadrian (r. 117-138), the libretto tells a fictional love story in which the virtue of Adriano is tested by his infatuation with Emirena, a Parthian princess, before his marriage to the Roman noblewoman Sabina. One of the subplots in the story is the attempt by Osroa to kill Adriano in a fire. Eventually, all ends well; Osroa is spared, Farnaspe marries Emirena, and Adriano renews his original engagement to Sabina. The scenario contradicts the true chronology of the relationship between Hadrian and Sabina, who was actually married to Hadrian in the year 100, long before he became emperor. Hadrian was appointed governor of the Roman province of Syria by the Emperor Trajan in 117, just before he became emperor, and he tarried there for a time during his early reign.

== Operas based on the Metastasio libretto ==
- 1732: Antonio Caldara
- 1733: Geminiano Giacomelli
- 1734: Giovanni Battista Pergolesi, Adriano in Siria
- 1734: Pietro Giuseppe Sandoni
- 1735: Francesco Maria Veracini (adaptation of the libretto by Angelo Cori)
- 1735: Riccardo Broschi
- 1736: Egidio Duni
- 1737: Giovanni Battista Ferrandini
- 1737: José de Nebra, Adriano en Siria o Más gloria es triunfar de sí
- 1737: Giovanni Porta
- 1739: Giovanni Alberto Ristori
- 1740: Baldassare Galuppi
- 1740: Michele Caballone
- 1740: Giovanni Battista Lampugnani
- 1740: Antonio Giai
- 1745: Giovanni Verocai, Die getreue Emirena Parthische Prinzeßin
- 1745: Carl Heinrich Graun, Artabanus
- 1746: Girolamo Abos
- 1746: Paolo Scalabrini
- 1747: Gaetano Latilla
- 1747-48: Vincenzo Legrenzio Ciampi
- 1750: Ignazio Fiorillo
- 1750: Giovan Battista Pescetti
- 1750: Antonio Gaetano Pampani
- 1751: Andrea Adolfati
- 1752: Giuseppe Scarlatti
- 1752: Johann Adolph Hasse
- 1752: Davide Perez
- 1753: Michelangelo Valentini
- 1753: Giuseppe Scolari
- 1754: Nicola Conforto
- 1755: Andrea Bernasconi
- 1756: Rinaldo di Capua
- 1757: Francesco Uttini
- 1757: Francesco Brusa
- 1758: Giovanni Battista Borghi
- 1758: Baldassare Galuppi (second version)
- 1760: Antonio Maria Mazzoni
- 1762: Johann Gottfried Schwanenberger
- 1762: Giuseppe Colla
- 1763: Gregorio Sciroli
- 1764: Marian Wimmer
- 1765: Pietro Alessandro Guglielmi
- 1765: Johann Christian Bach
- 1768: Ignaz Holzbauer
- 1768: Hieronymus Mango
- 1769: Gian Francesco de Majo
- 1769: Carlo Monza
- 1770: Antonio Sacchini
- 1770: Antonio Tozzi
- 1773: Giacomo Insanguine
- 1775: Gaetano Monti
- 1776: Josef Mysliveček, Adriano in Siria
- 1777: Pasquale Anfossi
- 1778: Giuseppe Sarti
- 1779: Felice Alessandri
- 1781: Giacomo Rust
- 1782: Luigi Cherubini
- 1788: Jakob Friedrich Gauss, Hadrian in Syrien
- 1789: Sebastiano Nasolini
- 1798: Simon Mayr
- 1799: Étienne Méhul, Adrien, libretto by François-Benoît Hoffman adapted from Metastasio
- 1807: Joseph Weigl, Kaiser Hadrian
- 1811: Vincento Migliorucci
- 1813: Marcos Portugal
- 1815: Giuseppe Farinelli
- 1821: Pietro Airoldi
- 1828: Saverio Mercadante
