= Francesco Feo =

Italian composer (1691-1761)

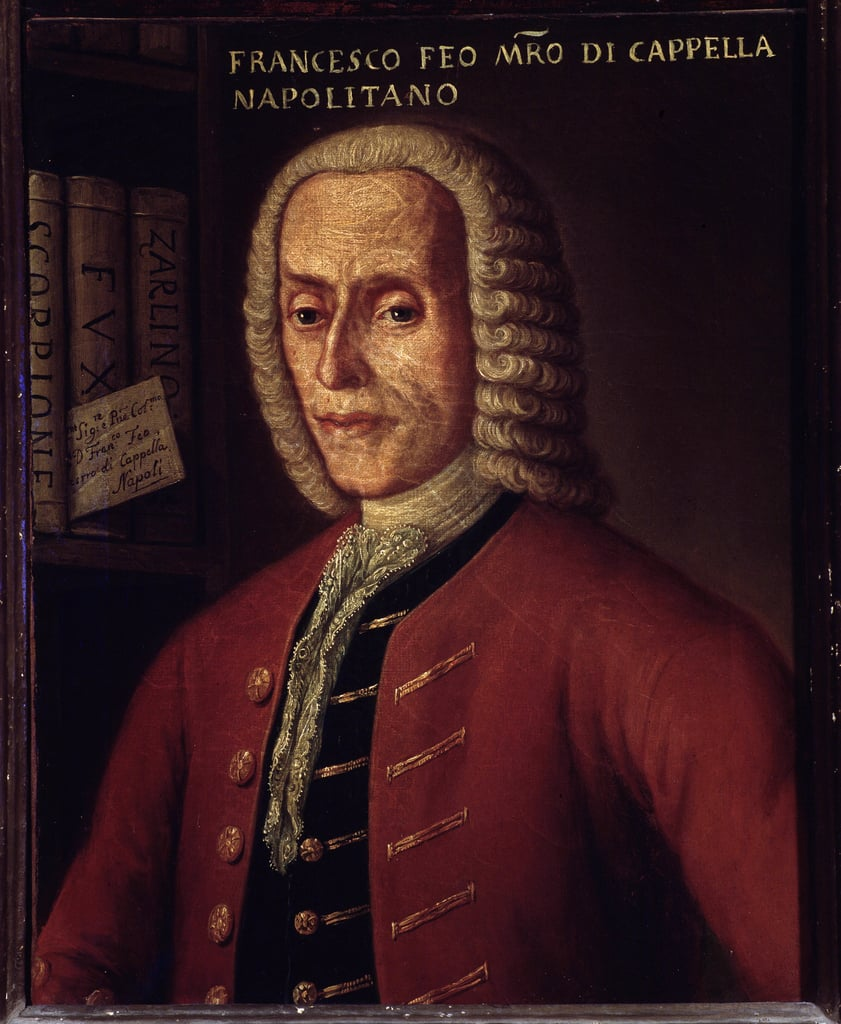
Francesco Feo.

Francesco Feo (1691 – 28 January 1761) was an Italian composer, known chiefly for his operas. He was born and died in Naples, where most of his operas were premièred.

== Life ==
Feo studied music at the Conservatorio di Santa Maria della Pietà in Naples, starting on 3 September 1704. Among the other composers he met, there were Leonardo Leo, Giuseppe de Majo (who would later marry his niece), and Niccolò Jommelli. His first teacher was Andrea Basso, and after 1705 Nicola Fago, who had only just been appointed. Feo remained at the conservatory until some time around 1712.

In 1713, he presented his first opera, L’amor tirannico, ossia Zenobia (Tyrannical Love, or Zenobia), and for carnival 1714 Il martirio di Santa Caterina (The Martyrdom of Saint Catherine of Egypt), an oratorio. His fame began to increase with sacred works for local churches, such as his Missa defunctorum (Requiem Mass) in 1718, and with his recitatives, arias and comic scenes for performances of operas by other composers when they were staged in Naples.

In 1719, Feo wrote La forza della virtù (The Power of Virtue), and then his opera seria Teuzzone in 1720. Real fame only came with his opera seria Siface, re di Numidia (Syphax, King of Numidia), for the Teatro San Bartolomeo in 1723. The libretto was the first attempt at dramma per musica by the 25-year-old Pietro Metastasio, who had just arrived in Naples.

With his increasing popularity, Feo was appointed as a teacher in the Conservatorio di Sant'Onofrio a Porta Capuana, where he worked alongside Gabriele Prota and took over from Nicola Grillo. In the next sixteen years he became known as one of the most important teachers in Naples. Among his students at Sant'Onofrio were Nicolò Jommelli, Nicola Sabatino, Matteo Capranica, and Gennaro Manna. In 1739, he left Sant'Onofrio to teach at the Conservatorio dei Poveri di Gesù Cristo, to replace Francesco Durante who had just retired. Feo would stay there until 1743, helped by Alfonso Caggi and later Girolamo Abos. During his time there, he taught Giacomo Insanguine and Gian Francesco de Majo.

Feo wrote most of his oratorios between 1723 and 1743, along with a good portion of his cantatas and much other sacred music. His best-known oratorio was San Francesco Salesio, Apostolo del Chablais (Saint Francis de Sales, the Apostle of Chablais, 1734), which would be performed many times in the next twenty years or so throughout Italy. For Rome and Turin, he wrote another six opere serie and several intermezzi. Just as his friend Giovanni Battista Pergolesi was commissioned in 1734-35 by the Cavalieri della Vergine dei Dolori to write a new Stabat Mater to replace the now unfashionable one written by Alessandro Scarlatti, so Feo was commissioned to replace Scarlatti's St. John Passion. Feo composed the serenate Oreste and Polinice for Madrid in 1738, and for the Fathers of the Holy Cross in Prague he wrote the oratorio La distruzione dell’esercito dei Cananei con la morte di Sisara (The Destruction of the Canaanite Army and the Death of Sisara, 1739). His last opera, Arsace, was performed in Turin for the reopening of the Teatro Regio in 1740. His last oratorio, Ruth, was performed at Rome in 1743.

In 1743, the Poveri di Gesù Cristo was abolished and converted into a seminary. Feo retired from teaching, but continued to compose sacred music for Neapolitan churches, including the Santissima Annunziata Maggiore, where he became maestro di cappella in 1726. His last autograph composition is a Quoniam tu solus sanctus (For Thou alone art holy), 1760, for tenor and strings.

== Works ==
Operas:

- L'amor tirannico, ossia Zenobia (1713)
- Lucio Papirio (1717)
- La forza della virtù (1719)
- Teuzzone (1720)
- Siface, re di Numidia (1723)
- Morano e Rosina (1723)
- Don Chisciotte della Mancia (1726)
- Coriando lo speciale (1726)
- Ipermestra (1728)
- Arianna (1728)
- Tamese (1729)
- Il vedovo (1729)
- Andromaca (1730)
- L'Issipile (1733)
- Oreste (1738)
- Polinice (1738)
- Arsace (1740)

Oratorios:

- San Francesco di Sales (1734)

Sacred:

- Passio secundum Joannem (St. John Passion).
- Mass. Confitebor a 5.

== Sources ==
- The Oxford Dictionary of Opera, by John Warrack and Ewan West (1992), 782 pages, ISBN 0-19-869164-5
