= La clemenza di Tito =

1791 opera by W. A. Mozart

- Opera by W. A. Mozart
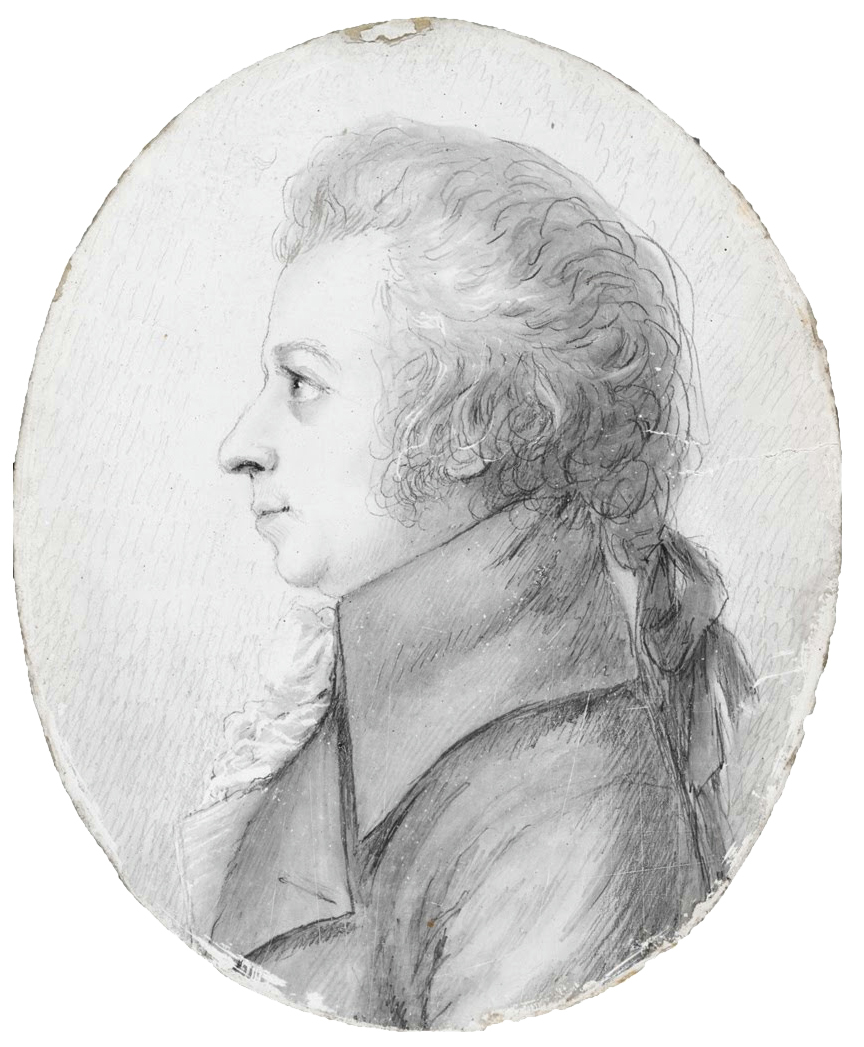
- The composer, drawing by Doris Stock, 1789
- Translation: The Clemency of Titus
- Librettist: Caterino Mazzolà
- Language: Italian
- Based on: La clemenza di Tito by Pietro Metastasio
- Premiere: 6 September 1791; Estates Theatre in Prague

La clemenza di Tito (The Clemency of Titus), K. 621, is a two-act dramma per musica (now called opera seria) by Wolfgang Amadeus Mozart, composed to an existing Italian libretto by Pietro Metastasio as modified by Caterino Mazzolà. Mozart completed the work in the midst of composing Die Zauberflöte, his last opera. La clemenza di Tito premiered on 6 September 1791 at the Estates Theatre in Prague.

== Background ==
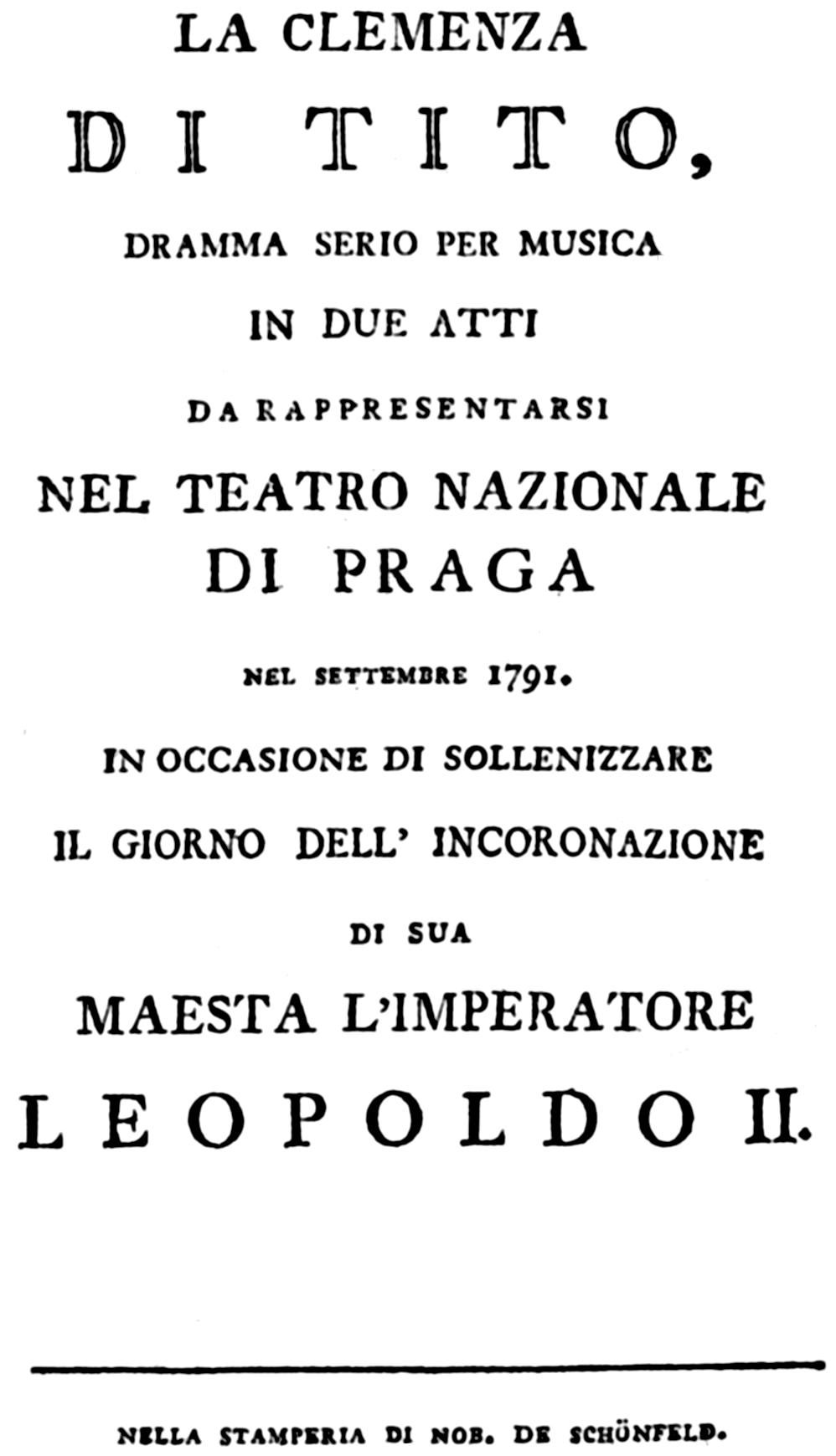
Libretto title page with dedication (1791)

In 1791, the last year of his life, Mozart was already well advanced in writing Die Zauberflöte by July when he was asked to compose an opera seria. The commission came from the impresario Domenico Guardasoni, who lived in Prague and who had been charged by the Estates of Bohemia with providing a new work to celebrate the coronation of Leopold II, Holy Roman Emperor, as King of Bohemia. The coronation had been planned by the Estates in order to ratify a political agreement between Leopold and the nobility of Bohemia (it had rescinded efforts of Leopold's brother Joseph II to initiate a program to free the serfs of Bohemia and increase the tax burden of aristocratic landholders). Leopold desired to pacify the Bohemian nobility in order to forestall revolt and strengthen his empire in the face of political challenges engendered by the French Revolution. The ceremony was to take place on 6 September; Guardasoni had been approached about the opera in June. No opera of Mozart was more clearly pressed into the service of a political agenda than La clemenza di Tito, in this case to promote the reactionary political and social policies of an aristocratic elite. No evidence exists to evaluate Mozart's attitude toward this, or even whether he was aware of the internal political conflicts raging in the kingdom of Bohemia in 1791.

In a contract dated 8 July, Guardasoni promised that he would engage a castrato "of leading quality" (this seems to have mattered more than who wrote the opera); that he would "have the libretto caused to be written...and to be set to music by a distinguished maestro". The time was tight and Guardasoni had a get-out clause: if he failed to secure a new text, he would resort to La clemenza di Tito, a libretto written more than half a century earlier by Pietro Metastasio (1698–1782).

Metastasio's libretto had already been set by nearly 40 composers; the story is based on the life of Roman Emperor Titus, from some brief hints in The Lives of the Caesars by the Roman writer Suetonius, and was elaborated by Metastasio in 1734 for the Italian composer Antonio Caldara. Among later settings were Gluck's in 1752 and Josef Mysliveček's version in 1774. Mozart was definitely familiar with the libretto before composition; in 1770, he saw a production with his father of Michelangelo Valentini's setting in Cremona. There would be three further settings after 1791. Mozart was not Guardasoni's first choice. Instead, he approached Antonio Salieri, the most distinguished composer of Italian opera in Vienna and head of the music establishment at the imperial court. But Salieri was too busy, and he declined the commission, although he did attend the coronation.

The libretto was edited into a more useful state by the court poet Caterino Mazzolà. Unusually, in Mozart's personal catalogue of compositions, Mazzolà is credited for his revision with the note that the libretto had been "reworked into a true opera". Mazzolà conflated the original three act libretto into two acts, and none of the original Metastasio arias are from the original middle act. Mazzolà replaced a lot of the dialogue with ensembles and wrote a new act one finale, cobbled from lines in the original libretto, which presents the uprising, whereas Metastasio merely describes it.

Guardasoni's experience of Mozart's work on Don Giovanni convinced him that the younger composer was more than capable of working on the tightest deadline. Mozart readily accepted the commission given his fee would be twice the price of a similar opera commissioned in Vienna. Mozart's earliest biographer Niemetschek alleged that the opera was completed in just 18 days, and in such haste that the secco recitatives were supplied by another composer, probably Franz Xaver Süssmayr, believed to have been Mozart's pupil. Although no other documentation exists to confirm Süssmayr's participation, none of the secco recitatives are in Mozart's autograph, and it is known that Süssmayr traveled with Mozart to Prague a week before the premiere to help with rehearsals, proofreading, and copying. It has been suggested by scholars of Mozart that he had been working on the opera much longer, perhaps since 1789; however, all such theories have now been thoroughly refuted in the English-language musicological literature. The opera may not have been written in just 18 days, but it certainly ranks with Rossini's L'italiana in Algeri, Il barbiere di Siviglia and La Cenerentola as one of the operas written in the shortest amount of time that is still frequently performed today.

It is not known what Leopold thought of the opera written in his honor. Reports that his wife Maria Luisa of Spain dismissed it as una porcheria tedesca (literally in Italian "German swinishness", but most idiomatically translated "A German mess") do not pre-date 1871, in a collection of literary vignettes by Alfred Meissner about the history of Prague purportedly based on recollections of the author's grandfather, who was present for the coronation ceremonies.

== Performance history ==
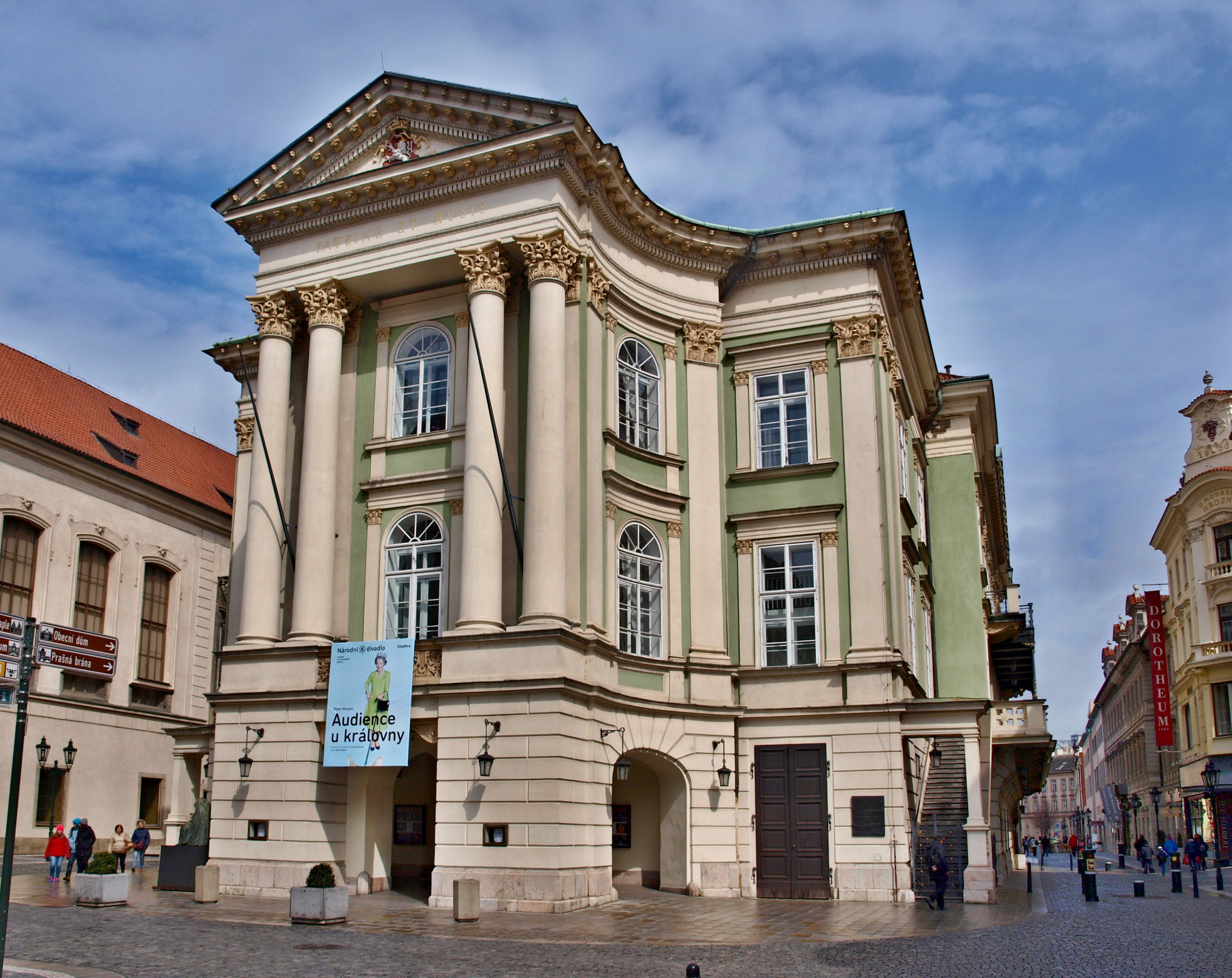
The Estates Theatre in Prague, the venue of the world premiere of the opera in 1791

It has been commonly asserted that Mozart himself was the conductor, although H. C. Robbins Landon says that is "most unlikely". The role of Sesto was taken by the castrato soprano Domenico Bedini. The opera was first performed publicly on 6 September 1791 at the Estates Theatre in Prague. While the orchestra was that of the theatre, the clarinet player Anton Stadler had journeyed to Prague with Mozart and played in the orchestra. It was for him that Mozart wrote two very prominent obbligati: for basset clarinet in Sesto's aria "Parto, parto, ma tu ben mio", and for basset horn in Vitellia's aria "Non più di fiori".

Excerpts from the opera were performed on 28 February 1796 at the Berlin Royal Opera, with Margarete Luise Schick, Henriette Righini, Auguste Amalie Schmalz, August Fischer, Friedrich Franz Hurka, and Constanze Mozart performing.

The opera remained popular for many years after Mozart's death. It was the first full Mozart opera to reach London, receiving its première there at His Majesty's Theatre on 27 March 1806. The cast included John Braham, whose long-time companion Nancy Storace had been the first Susanna in The Marriage of Figaro in Vienna. However, as it was only played once, it does not appear to have attracted much interest. As far as can be gathered, it was not staged in London again until at the St Pancras Festival in 1957. The first performance at La Scala in Milan was on 26 December 1818.

The North American premiere was staged on 4 August 1952 at the Berkshire Music Center in Tanglewood. This production was conducted by Sarah Caldwell and was performed in an English-language translation by Boris Goldovsky. It starred Lloyd Oostenbrug as Tito, Irene Jordan as Vitellia, Sarah Jane Fleming as Servilia, Shirley Winston as Sesto, Jacqueline Langee as Annio, and Richard Sharretts as Publio.

For a long time, Mozart scholars regarded Tito as an inferior effort of the composer. Alfred Einstein in 1945 wrote that it was "customary to speak disparagingly of La clemenza di Tito and to dismiss it as the product of haste and fatigue", and he continues the disparagement to some extent by condemning the characters as puppets – e.g., "Tito is nothing but a mere puppet representing magnanimity" – and claiming that the opera seria was already a moribund form. However, in recent years the opera has undergone something of a reappraisal. Stanley Sadie considered it to show Mozart "responding with music of restraint, nobility and warmth to a new kind of stimulus". The opera retains a reasonably high profile, and is in the lower reaches of the 'Top 50' performed at major houses worldwide.

At the Salzburg Festival 2017, Peter Sellars directed his interpretation of the opera as "a vision of peaceful coexistence", "reaching far beyond the historical context". It was a coproduction with the Dutch National Opera, Amsterdam, and the Deutsche Oper Berlin. Conducted by Teodor Currentzis, it premiered on 27 July 2017 at the Felsenreitschule in Salzburg.

The opera was also performed as part of Glyndebourne's 2017 summer festival. In 2019 the Los Angeles Opera put on the work for the first time in its history in an all new production, conducted by James Conlon and starring Russell Thomas in the title role and Elizabeth DeShong as Sesto. In the same year the opera was performed at the Metropolitan Opera in New York City and broadcast on 20 April 2019.

== Roles ==
Roles, voice types, premier cast
Role	Voice type	Premiere cast 6 September 1791
Tito Vespasian, Roman Emperor	tenor	Antonio Baglioni
Vitellia, daughter of the deposed Emperor Vitellio	soprano	Maria Marchetti-Fantozzi
Sesto, a young patrician, friend of Tito, in love with Vitellia	soprano castrato; in modern performance mezzo-soprano or countertenor	Domenico Bedini
Annio, a young patrician, friend of Sesto, in love with Servilia	soprano (en travesti) is listed in the score, but usually sung by mezzo-soprano	Carolina Perini
Servilia, sister of Sesto, in love with Annio	soprano	Antonina Campi, née Mikłaszewicz (also called Signora Antonini)
Publio, Praetorian prefect, commander of the Praetorian Guard	bass	Gaetano Campi

== Instrumentation ==
The opera is scored for 2 flutes, 2 oboes, 2 clarinets (1 also basset clarinet and basset horn), 2 bassoons, 2 horns, 2 trumpets, timpani and strings. Basso continuo in recitativi secchi is made up of cembalo and violoncello.

== Synopsis ==
Place and time: Ancient Rome, in the year 79.

=== Act 1 ===
Vitellia, daughter of the late emperor Vitellius (who had been deposed by Tito's father Vespasian), wants revenge against Tito. She stirs up Tito's vacillating friend Sesto, who is in love with her, to act against him (duet "Come ti piace, imponi"). But when she hears word that Tito has sent Berenice of Cilicia, of whom she was jealous, back to Jerusalem, Vitellia tells Sesto to delay carrying out her wishes, hoping Tito will choose her (Vitellia) as his empress (aria "Deh, se piacer mi vuoi").

Tito, however, decides to choose Sesto's sister Servilia to be his empress, and orders Annio (Sesto's friend) to bear the message to Servilia (aria "Del più sublime soglio"). Since Annio and Servilia, unbeknownst to Tito, are in love, this news is very unwelcome to both (duet "Ah, perdona al primo affetto"). Servilia decides to tell Tito the truth but also says that if Tito still insists on marrying her, she will obey. Tito thanks the gods for Servilia's truthfulness, and immediately forswears the idea of coming between her and Annio (aria "Ah, se fosse intorno al trono").

In the meantime, however, Vitellia has heard the news about Tito's interest in Servilia and is again boiling with jealousy. She urges Sesto to assassinate Tito. He agrees, singing one of the opera's most famous arias ("Parto, parto, ma tu, ben mio" with basset clarinet obbligato). Almost as soon as he leaves, Annio and the guard Publio arrive to escort Vitellia to Tito, who has now chosen her as his empress. She is filled with feelings of guilt and worry over what she has sent Sesto to do.

Sesto, meanwhile, is at the Capitol wrestling with his conscience (recitativo "Oh Dei, che smania è questa"), as he and his accomplices set about burning it down. The other characters (except Tito) enter severally and react with horror to the burning Capitol. Sesto reenters and announces that he saw Tito slain, but Vitellia stops him from incriminating himself as the assassin. The others lament Tito in a slow, mournful conclusion to act one.

=== Act 2 ===
The act begins with Annio telling Sesto that Emperor Tito is in fact alive and has just been seen; in the smoke and chaos, Sesto had mistaken someone else for Tito. Sesto wants to leave Rome, but Annio persuades him not to (aria "Torna di Tito a lato"). Soon Publio arrives to arrest Sesto, bearing the news that it was one of Sesto's co-conspirators who dressed himself in Tito's robes and was stabbed, though not mortally, by Sesto. The Senate tries Sesto as Tito waits impatiently, sure that his friend will be exonerated; Publio expresses his doubts (aria "Tardi s'avvede d'un tradimento") and leaves for the Senate. Annio begs Tito to show clemency towards his friend (aria "Tu fosti tradito"). Publio returns and announces that Sesto has been found guilty and that his death sentence only awaits Tito's signature.

Attempting to obtain further details about the plot, the anguished Tito decides to send for Sesto first. Sesto takes all the guilt on himself and says he deserves death (rondo "Deh, per questo istante solo"), so Tito tells him he shall have it and sends him away. But after an extended inner struggle, Tito tears up the execution warrant for Sesto. He determines that, if the world will accuse him (Tito) of anything, it should charge him with showing too much mercy, rather than with having a vengeful heart (aria "Se all'impero").

Vitellia at this time is wracked with guilt, but Servilia warns her that tears alone will not save Sesto (aria "S'altro che lagrime"). Vitellia finally decides to confess all to Tito, giving up her hopes of empire (rondo "Non più di fiori" with basset horn obbligato). In the amphitheatre, the condemned (including Sesto) are waiting to be thrown to the wild beasts. Tito is about to show mercy, when Vitellia offers her confession as the instigator of Sesto's plot. Although shocked, the emperor includes her in the general clemency he offers (recitativo accompagnato "Ma che giorno è mai questo?"). The opera concludes with all the subjects praising the extreme generosity of Tito; he then asks that the gods cut short his days, should he ever cease to care for the good of Rome.

== Recordings ==
Many recordings have been made, including the following:

Year	Cast: Tito, Vitellia, Sesto, Annio, Servilia, Publio	Conductor orchestra, chorus	Label Catalogue number
1956 (in English)	Richard Lewis, Joan Sutherland; Monica Sinclair; Anna Pollak; Jennifer Vyvyan; Thomas Hemsley	John Pritchard; London Mozart Players, BBC Chorus	CD: Nimbus; Cat: NI7967
1967	Werner Krenn, Maria Casula, Teresa Berganza, Brigitte Fassbaender, Lucia Popp, Tugomir Franc	István Kertész; Vienna State Opera Orchestra and Chorus; produced by Erik Smith	CD: Decca; Cat: 000289 475 7030 1
1976	Stuart Burrows, Janet Baker, Yvonne Minton, Frederica von Stade, Lucia Popp, Robert Lloyd	Colin Davis; Orchestra and Chorus of the Royal Opera House, Covent Garden	CD: Philips Classics; Cat: 000289 422 5442 8 For details, see here
1978	Peter Schreier, Júlia Várady, Teresa Berganza, Marga Schiml, Edith Mathis, Theo Adam	Karl Böhm; Staatskapelle Dresden, Leipzig Radio Chorus	CD: Deutsche Grammophon; Cat: 000289 429 8782 1
1988	Gösta Winbergh, Carol Vaness, Delores Ziegler, Martha Senn, Christine Barbaux, László Polgár	Riccardo Muti; Vienna Philharmonic Orchestra, Chorus of the Vienna State Opera	CD: EMI; Cat: CDS 5 55489-2
1990	Anthony Rolfe Johnson, Júlia Várady, Anne Sofie von Otter, Catherine Robbin, Sylvia McNair, Cornelius Hauptmann	John Eliot Gardiner; English Baroque Soloists, Monteverdi Choir	CD: Deutsche Grammophon "Archiv"; Cat: 000289 431 8062 7
1991	Philip Langridge, Ashley Putnam, Diana Montague, Martine Mahé, Elżbieta Szmytka, Peter Rose	Andrew Davis; London Philharmonic Orchestra, Glyndebourne Chorus	DVD Video: ArtHaus Musik; Cat: 100 407
1992	Uwe Heilmann, Della Jones, Cecilia Bartoli, Diana Montague, Barbara Bonney, Gilles Cachemaille	Christopher Hogwood; Academy of Ancient Music Orchestra and Chorus	CD: Decca "L'Oiseau-Lyre"; Cat: 000289 444 1312 0
1993	Philip Langridge, Lucia Popp, Ann Murray, Delores Ziegler, Ruth Ziesak, László Polgár	Nikolaus Harnoncourt; Zurich Opera Orchestra and Chorus	CD: Warner Classics "Teldec"; Cat: 2564-68830-8
2005	Rainer Trost, Hillevi Martinpelto, Magdalena Kožená, Christine Rice, Lisa Milne, John Relyea	Charles Mackerras; Scottish Chamber Orchestra, Scottish Baroque Chorus	CD: Deutsche Grammophon; Cat: 000289 477 5792 4
2005	Mark Padmore, Alexandrina Pendatchanska, Bernarda Fink, Marie-Claude Chappuis, Sunhae Im, Sergio Foresti	René Jacobs; Freiburg Baroque Orchestra, Berlin RIAS Chamber Chorus	CD: Harmonia Mundi; Cat: HMC901923.24
2005	Christoph Prégardien, Catherine Naglestad, Susan Graham, Ekaterina Siurina, Hannah Esther Minutillo, Roland Bracht	Sylvain Cambreling; Orchestra and Chorus of Paris National Opera	DVD Video / BD: Opus Arte; Cat: OA 0942 / OA BD7086D
2018	Rolando Villazón, Joyce DiDonato, Marina Rebeka, Regula Mühlemann, Tara Erraught	Yannick Nézet-Séguin; Chamber Orchestra of Europe and RIAS Kammerchor	CD / Deutsche Grammophon; Cat: 00289 483 5210

== See also ==
- List of operas by Mozart
