= Auser Musici =

Auser Musici is a period instrument ensemble centered in Pisa that specializes in early music repertory from the Tuscan region of Italy.

== History, Mission, and Activities ==
The ensemble was founded in 1997 by the flautist Carlo Ipata and has performed throughout the continent of Europe, especially in Italy, as well as in the United States. Its concerts feature vocal and instrumental works composed in the seventeenth and eighteenth centuries, frequently including selections from the series Tesori Musicali Toscani, a collection of early music published in Pisa. The home concert venue of Auser Musici is located in the Teatro Giuseppe Verdi of Pisa. The ensemble is named for an ancient river of the Pisan region.

Auser Musici has released recordings continuously since the year 1998, presently under exclusive contract with Hyperion Records. In 2010, its recording of flute concertos by Neapolitan composers was singled out by the International Record Review as an Editor’s Choice.

The principal singers who perform regularly with Auser Musici are the sopranos Maria Grazia Schiavo and Elena Cecchi Fedi and the baritone Furio Zanasi. The organization is administered under the direction of Piero Torrigiani and Pierpaolo Corradini.

Auser Musici maintains a reciprocal relationship with Musica Toscana of Louisville, Kentucky, another organization devoted to the promotion of music from the Tuscan region of Italy.

== Recordings ==
- Francesco Barsanti: Sei sonate Op. 2 per flauto traverso, Agorà AG 157.1 (1998)
- Antonio Brunelli: Fioretti Spirituali, Agorà AG 187.1 (1999)
- Luigi Boccherini: Giuseppe Riconosciuto, Bongiovanni GB 2298/99-2 (2001)
- Pietro Nardini: Overtures and Flute Concertos, Agorà Musica AG 157.1 (2002)
- Francesco Barsanti: Concerti Grossi, Op. 3 (nos. 1, 4, 6, 7, 10), Tactus Records TC.690201 (2003)
- Cristiano Giuseppe Lidarti: Musica da camera e concerto per clavicembalo, Tactus Records TC.733701 (2003)
- Francesco Geminiani: Concerti grossi, Op. 2, Symphonia SY 02200 (2003)
- Francesco Gasparini: Dori & Daliso – Mirena & Floro, Symphonia SY 03207 (2004)
- Antonio Brunelli: Arie, scherzi, canzonette & madrigali per suonare & cantare, Symphonia SY 04209 (2005)
- Luigi Boccherini: Flute Quintets, Op. 19, Hyperion CDA67646 (2008)
- Christian Joseph Lidarti: Violin Concertos, Hyperion CDA67685 (2008)
- Nicola Porpora: ”Or sì m’aveggio, oh amore”: Cantatas for Soprano, Hyperion CDA67621 (2008)
- Antonio Cesti: Le disgrazie d’amore, Hyperion CDA67771 (2010)
- Neapolitan Flute Concertos [by Antonio Palella, Genaro Rava, Giuseppe de Majo, Nicolò Jommelli, and Tommaso Prota], Hyperion CDA67784 (2010)

== See also ==
Flute
Historically informed performance
Baroque music
List of early music ensembles
