= Record Review (disambiguation) =

Record Review (radio programme) refers to a radio programme on BBC Radio 3. It may also refer to:

- Hi-Fi News & Record Review, a British magazine
- International Record Review, an independent British magazine
- Music criticism
