= Maria Giustina Turcotti =

18th-century Italian opera singer

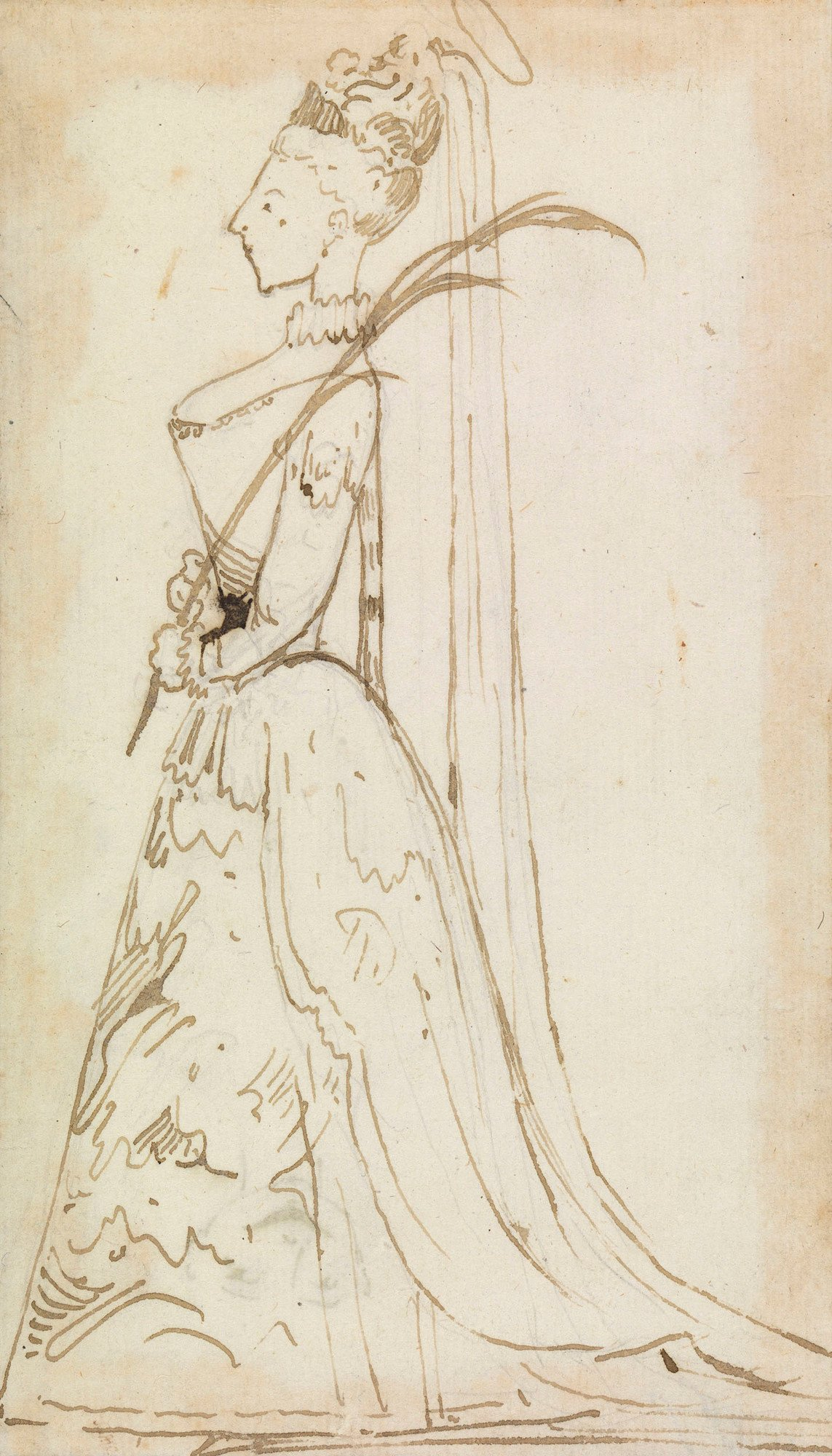
- Pen and ink drawing of Turcotti by Marco Ricci, c. 1720–1730
- Born: c. 1700; Florence
- Died: after 1763
- Occupations: Opera singer; voice teacher
- Organizations: Margravial Opera House, Bayreuth

Maria Giustina Turcotti, sometimes shortened to Giustina Turcotti, (born c. 1700 − died after 1763) was an Italian vocalist who had a career in opera. Sources vary in describing her voice type, some identifying her as a soprano and others a mezzo-soprano. She performed in opera houses in Italy from 1717 through 1746, and then toured Europe as a member of Pietro Mingotti's opera troupe from 1746 to 1750. She was a resident singer at the Bayreuth court opera; a position she held from 1750 until 1758 and then again from 1760 through 1763. After this period no record of the singer has been found.

Turcotti was a gifted singer of coloratura and several composers of the era wrote music specifically for her voice; including Antonio Vivaldi, Nicola Porpora, Giovanni Battista Pergolesi, Giuseppe Sellitto, Giovanni Battista Pescetti, and Francesco Corselli. She also worked as a voice teacher, and one of her pupils was the tenor Ernst Christoph Dressler. Several publications writing on the singer's late career have emphasized her weight; particularly focusing on the quotes of her employers, colleagues, and critics in regards to her size. This also includes a well known caricature of the singer from 1742 by the Venetian artist Antonio Maria Zanetti which emphasized her girth and is now part of the Royal Collection at Windsor Castle.

== Life and career ==
Born c. 1700 in Florence, Maria Giustina Turcotti first appeared in operas in 1717 in both her native city and in Siena. She made her professional debut at the Teatro del Cocomero. Her voice has been described as a mezzo-soprano in some publications, and as a soprano in others. Her brother was the theatre agent Raffaele Turcotti.

Turcotti did not devote herself to performing full time until 1720, and she was thereafter busy as a leading singer in the opera houses of Italy for the next 26 years; commanding one of the larger salaries for opera singers during that period. She appeared in operas in Venice in 1721–1722, 1731–1732, and in 1742–1743. She was committed to opera houses in Naples in 1727 and 1732–1735; and also appeared at the Teatro San Bartolomeo in Naples in 1728 in the title role of the pastiche Stratonica which was staged by the impresario Angelo Carasale and used a modified version of an old libretto by Antonio Salvi with new text by Carlo de Palma.

In 1728 Turcotti performed the title role in the world premiere of Vivaldi's Atenaide at the Teatro della Pergola in Florence. At that same theatre she performed the title role in a 1729 production of Leonardo Vinci's 1726 opera Didone abbandonata with the composer creating a new aria specifically for her: "Son regina e sono amante". Turcotti's original manuscript for this aria is in the collection at the British Museum. In 1731-1732 she appeared in the world premieres of multiple operas at the Teatro San Angelo; including the roles of Elisa in the premiere of Nicola Porpora's Annibale (1731), Semiramis in the premiere of Francesco Corselli's Nino (1731), and Cleofide in the premiere of Giovanni Battista Pescetti's Alessandro nell'Indie (1732). In 1742 she appeared at the Teatro San Giovanni Grisostomo in the world premiere of Niccolò Jommelli's Semiramide.

In October 1734 Turcotti returned to the Teatro San Bartolomeo to create the role of Emirena in the world premiere of Pergolesi's Adriano in Siria which was written to celebrate the birthday of the Spanish Queen Elisabeth Farnese. The following December she appeared at that opera house again as Viriate in the premiere of Giuseppe Sellitto's setting of Metastasio's Siface, re di Numidia; a pastiche work which also contained music by other composers like Porpora, Geminiano Giacomelli, and Johann Adolph Hasse among others.

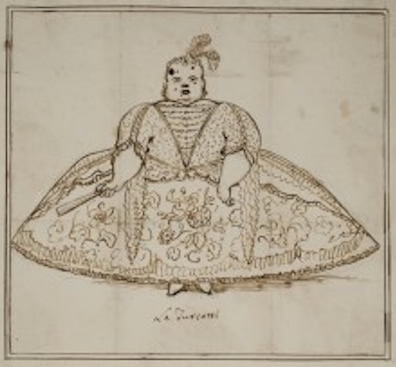
A 1742 caricature of Turcotti by Antonio Maria Zanetti

Turcotti's last appearances in Italy were in the cities of Crema and Ferrara in 1745–1746. In Crema she performed the title role in Giovanni Battista Lampugnani's Didone abbandonata in 1745. She then joined the roster of leading singers in the touring opera company of impresario Pietro Mingotti in 1746 with whom she spent the next four years touring Germany and Copenhagen. By this time in her career, Turcotti had become rather obese and she was described by Mingotti as "a monstrous mass of flesh, who accompanies every syllable with a grimace or emphatic gesture". Within the Mingotti troupe Turcotti had a professional rivalry with the German opera singer Marianne Pirker who repeatedly referred to Turcotti as the "fat pig" in letters written to her husband, the violinist Joseph Franz Pirker.

Criticisms of Turcotti's weight had occurred previously during her career in Italy, with multiple writers complaining that her weight hampered her movements on stage. In a 1742 letter from Aranjuez, Farinelli enquired after Turcotti's fate, wondering if she had lost weight or if she retained her enormous fatness, and affectionately wishing her all the best, "because her manners are different from the other prima donnas'". A well known caricature of Turcotti emphasizing her girth was created by the artist Antonio Maria Zanetti in 1742 and is part of the Royal Collection at Windsor Castle. The picture depicts Turcotti in the role of Irene from an October 1742 performance of Andrea Bernasconi's Il Bajazet at the Teatro San Giovanni Grisostomo. The artist's brother, critic Girolamo Zanetti of the publication Archivio Veneto, wrote in his review of that production that Turcotti "sang very well but was fat to the point of deformity". Another caricature of the artist by Giovanni Battista Tiepolo was in the private portrait collection of Carl Philipp Emanuel Bach.

In 1750 Turcotti became a resident singer at the Bayreuth court opera; a position she held until 1758 and then again from 1760 through 1763. Nothing more is known about the singer's life after her time at the Bayreuth court in 1763. While in Bayreuth she also worked as a voice teacher; notably training the tenor Ernst Christoph Dressler.

Music written for Turcotti by Pescetti and Corselli indicates that she was a singer who could execute difficult coloratura passages with complex rhythms and wide leaps in pitch.

== Bibliography ==
- Anthony Blunt, Edward Croft-Murray (1957). Venetian Drawings of the XVII & XVIII Centuries In the Collection of Her Majesty the Queen at Windsor Castle. Phaidon Press. p. 181.
- Carlo Broschi Farinelli (2000). La solitudine amica: Lettere al conte Sicinio Pepoli. Sellerio. ISBN 9788838915031.
- William Holmes (1993). Opera Observed: Views of a Florentine Impresario in the Early Eighteenth Century. University of Chicago Press. ISBN 9780226349701.
- Augustus Hughes-Hughes, ed. (1906). Catalogue of Manuscript Music in the British Museum, Volume 2. Order of the Trustees, British Museum, Department of Manuscripts.
- Dennis Libby and Carlo Vitali (2002). "Turcotti, Maria Giustina". Grove Music Online. Oxford Music Online. Oxford University Press. doi:10.1093/gmo/9781561592630.article.O002685. ISBN 9781561592630.
- Berthold Over, Gesa zur Nieden, ed. (2021). Operatic Pasticcios in 18th-Century Europe: Contexts, Materials and Aesthetics. Transcript Verlag. ISBN 9783839448854.
- Cristina Scuderi, Ingeborg Zechner (2019). Opera as Institution: Networks and Professions (1730-1917). LIT Verlag. ISBN 9783643911490.
- Annette Richards (2022). The Temple of Fame and Friendship: Portraits, Music, and History in the C. P. E. Bach Circle. University of Chicago Press. ISBN 9780226816777.
- Eleanor Selfridge-Field (2007). A new chronology of Venetian opera and related genres, 1660-1760. Stanford University Press. ISBN 9780804744379.
