= Maria Grazia Schiavo =

Italian classical soprano

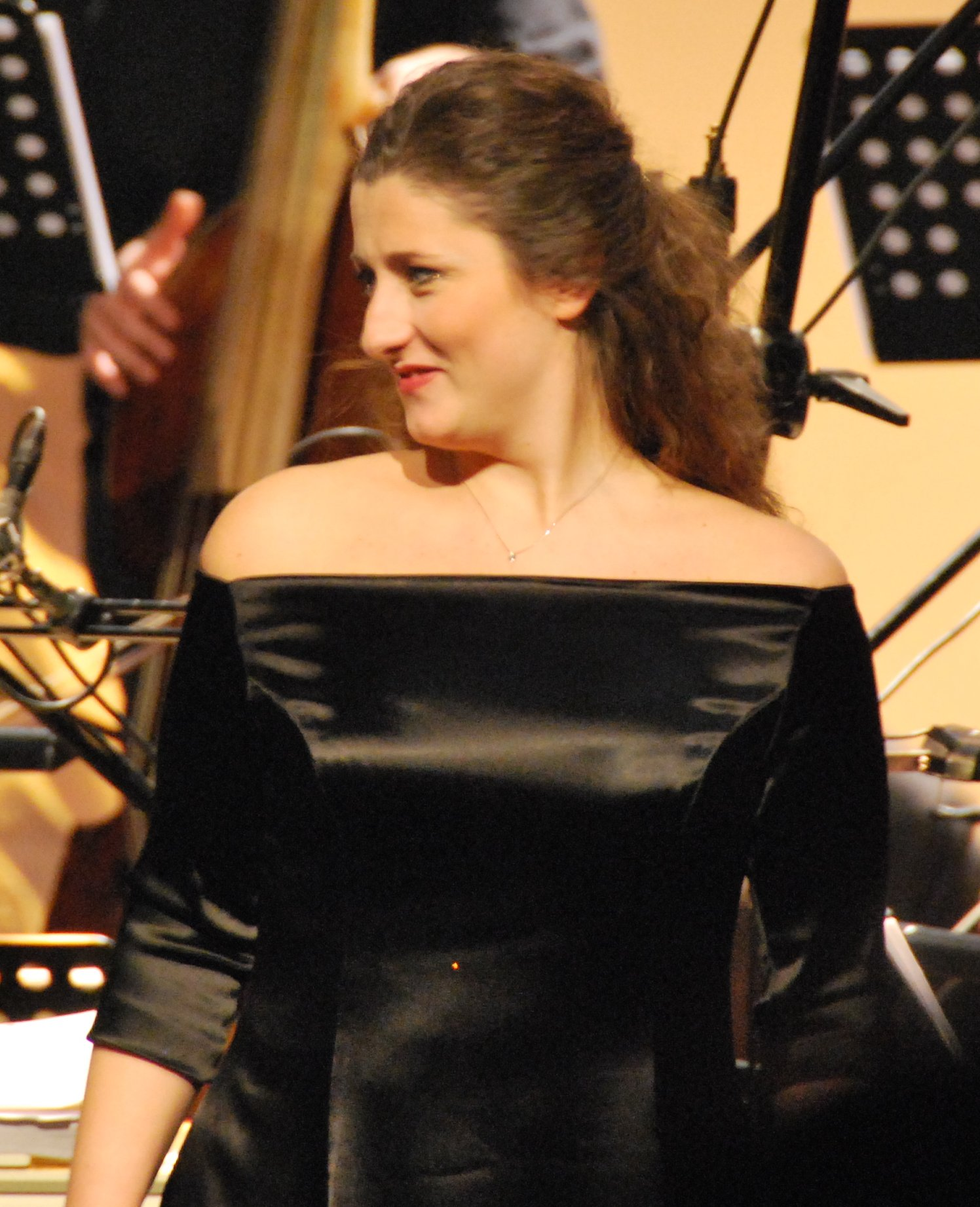
Maria Grazia Schiavo

Maria Grazia Schiavo (born 1975) (Italian pronunciation: [maˈriːa ˈɡrattsja ˈskjaːvo]) is an Italian classical soprano, particularly known for her performances of music from the baroque period.

== Life and career ==
Born in 1975 in Naples, Schiavo was trained at the Conservatorio San Pietro a Majella. After graduating, she won the Accademia Nazionale di Santa Cecilia competition and the International Singing Competition of Clermont-Ferrand. She has appeared in concerts of baroque music with the Accademia Bizantina, Al Ayre Español, Auser Musici, Concerto Italiano, and Europa Galante.

Schiavo made her professional opera debut in the title role of Roberto De Simone's La Gatta Cenerentola. In 2007, she portrayed Poppea in Domenico Scarlatti's Ottavia restituita al trono with the Opera de San Sebastián and Idaspe in Antonio Vivaldi's Bajazet at La Fenice.

In March 2008, she repeated the role of Idaspe at the Salle Pleyel in Paris and at the Teatro Real in Madrid. In February 2008, she performed the role of Faustina in the first modern performance of Leonardo Leo's Alidoro with the Cappella della Pietà de' Turchini in Reggio Emilia. In July 2008, she sang the roles of Sabina in Giovanni Battista Pergolesi's Adriano in Siria and Scarlatti's Poppea at the Festival de Beaune.

In 2011, she performed the roles of Anaï in Gioachino Rossini's Moïse et Pharaon at the Teatro dell'Opera di Roma, Berenice at the Théâtre des Champs-Élysées in Paris and the title heroine in Gaetano Donizetti's Lucia di Lammermoor at the Teatro Regio di Torino.
