= Siface, re di Numidia =

Libretto by Pietro Metastasio

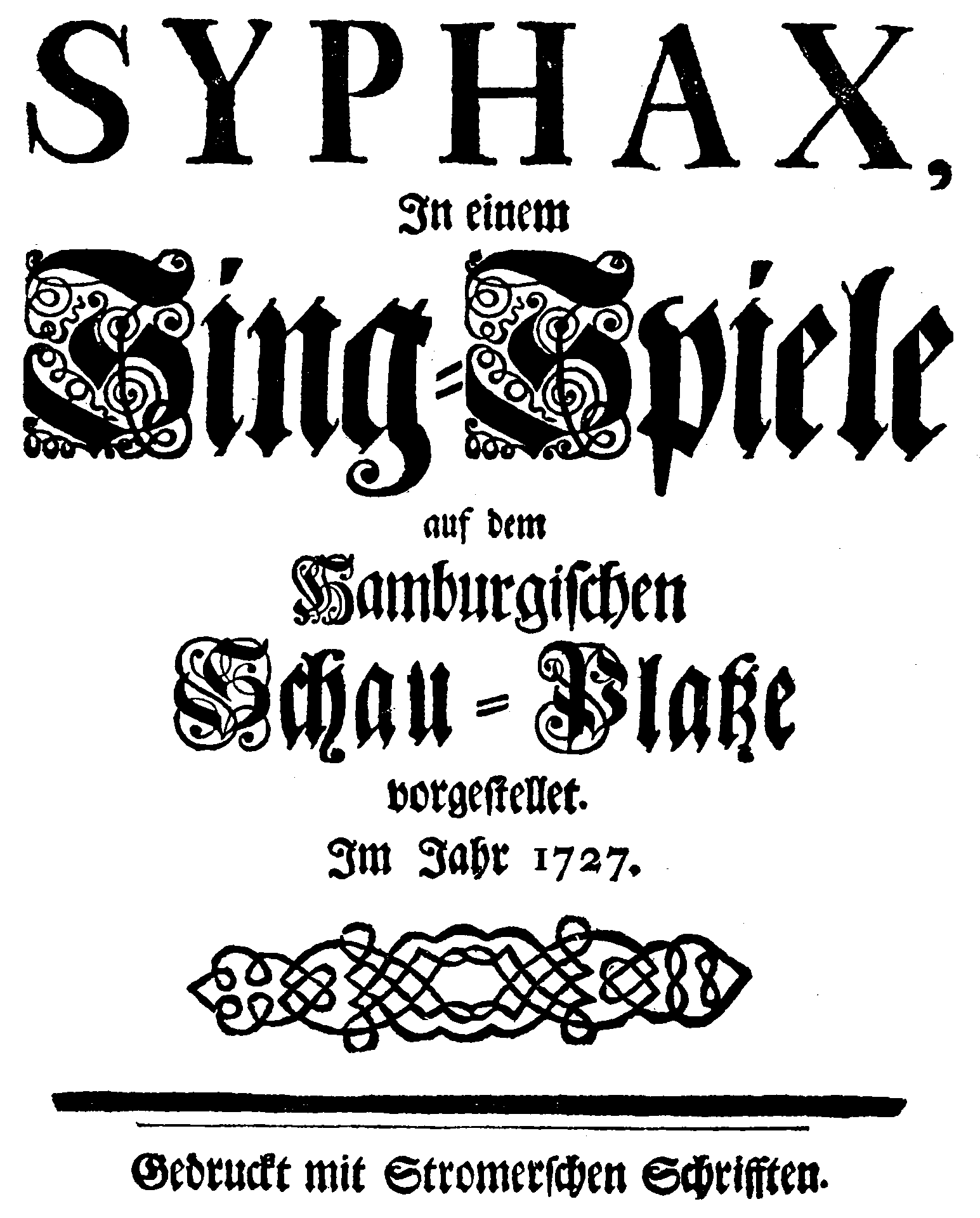
Nicola Porpora - Syphax - titlepage of the libretto - Hamburg 1727

Siface re di Numidia (also: Siface or Viriate) is a libretto in three acts by Pietro Metastasio. It is a reworking of La forza della virtù by de:Domenico David and was Metastasio's first work as a librettist. it was first performed with a setting to music by Francesco Feo on 13 May 1723 at the Teatro San Bartolomeo, Naples.

== Action ==
The action is set in Rusconia near Cirta in Numidia, around 205 BCE. The characters are:

- Siface (Syphax), King of Numidia
- Viriate, Princess of Lusitania
- Erminio, General in Siface's army, lover of Ismene
- Ismene, daughter of Orcanos
- Orcano, her father
- Libanio, confidant of Siface

Siface (Syphax) is planning a marriage of convenience with Viriate but then falls in love with Ismene. He then tries various intrigues to get rid of Viriate.

The following plot summary is based on the German translation of the libretto by de:Johann Philipp Praetorius, performed in 1727 in Hamburg with arias by Nicola Antonio Porpora and recitative by Georg Philipp Telemann. (Note: German libretto of the setting by Porpora at the Staatsbibliothek zu Berlin.)

=== Act 1 ===
Outside the city wall of Rusconia: Siface, Erminio and Orcano await the arrival of Viriate. Trumpets sound and Viriate comes ashore, accompanied by Siface's confidant Libanio. They are welcomed by Siface, Orcano and Erminio. Viriate is slightly offended, however, when Siface immediately sends her with Libanio and Orcano to his castle in Cirta. Siface then admits to Erminio that he has now fallen in love with Ismene, who is waiting for him right now. Since Erminio is in love with Ismene himself, this sets up a conflict between his love and his duty.

Pleasant place near the royal palace: Siface meets Ismene. Because of his engagement, she wants to end the relationship. However, Siface declares that he only loves her and promises to marry and crown her the same day. After he leaves, Erminio arrives and complains that she has left him. Although she will not give up her new love, he decides to stay true to her.

Royal cabinet: Viriate tells Orcano that Siface now wants to marry Ismene. Orcano denies this and leaves. Libanio, arrives, sent by Asif we to look for weaknesses in her behavior. To lure her into behaving inappropriately he claims to be in love with her, but she ignores him. When Orcano finds Ismene, she tells him about her relationship with the king. He accuses her of acting dishonorably and decides to exile her to the Scythia. When she refuses, he pulls out his sword to kill her. At this moment, however, Viriate intervenes. Since Orcano already sees her as his queen, he hands over the sword and asks her to kill him as a punishment for his daughter's dishonor. Viriate tries to appease him. After he leaves, Viriate tries to talk to Ismene, telling her that Siface was only enjoying her love, but would never marry her. Siface appears and they both accuse him of infidelity.

=== Act 2 ===
Magnificent colonnade: Libanio tells Siface that he has failed to compromise Viriate's virtue. Siface then orders her to be thrown into the dungeon. To justify this, he intends to falsify evidence of her infidelity and to sacrifice Ismene's admirer Erminio as well. Libanio goes to arrest Viriate. To appease Ismene, Siface shares his plan with her.

Orcano is still angry with his daughter and threatens her with the sword. Siface protects her, however, and Ismene leaves. Siface then affirms that he wants to marry Ismene and that Viriate had betrayed him. As proof, he shows him a fake letter from Viriate to Erminio. In it she writes about their love and their plan to murder Siface. Orcano secretly doubts the authenticity of the letter.

Libanio has Viriate captured. Erminio tries to free her, but is also captured. Ismene promises Viriate to use her influence with the King to free her, but Viriate doesn't believe her. After Viriate is kidnapped by Libanio, Ismene affirms to Erminio that she really loves him, but that the crown was more important to her.

Large courtroom: Libanio reports to Siface that he tried unsuccessfully to get Viriate's servant to testify against her and has therefore killed him. Siface decides to blame this murder on Erminio. The trial begins with Orcano as the judge. Viriate refuses to answer the lies about her and does not defend herself. Seeing through Siface's lies, Orcano pronounces judgment: he announces that the traitor must die but does not name them. Siface is ready to pardon Viriate if she acknowledges her guilt and leaves the country. When she rejects this, she is again led away. Siface now asks Erminio to confess, but he only admits to loving Ismene and assures Siface that Ismene only wants to marry him because of the crown. Siface angrily leaves the room.

=== Act 3 ===
Prison cell: Libanio brings Viriate poison and a dagger and asks her to choose her death. She chooses poison, but wishes to write a letter to her father beforehand. Siface secretly watches her write. Finally, fearing that his actions will be betrayed, he snatches the letter from her. However, it only contains an appeal to her father to forgive Siface, as she has already forgiven him. Siface is touched, but continues to insist on her death. She throws the poison cup away and demands his sword to kill herself. At that moment Erminio and Orcano come in and free her. However, when they try to kill Siface, Viriate stands protectively in front of him and sends them away. Finally she returns the sword to Siface and tells him now to enforce the judgment of the court.

Magnificent gallery: Unable to free Viriate, Erminio and Orcano decide to snatch Ismene from the tyrant and go in search of her. Meanwhile, Ismene and Libanio are waiting for the king to perform the wedding ceremony. Libanio is upset and leaves Ismene alone. Now Erminio comes and urges her to flee with him to avoid the king's anger. Orcano also comes and reports that Viriate has been released and Siface wants to marry her. He advises his daughter to recognize the queen and to ask for mercy. Then she could marry Erminio. When Siface arrives with his guard, the two ask him for forgiveness. However, he thanks them for saving his honor. Viriate also comes with her retinue and is praised by the choir as a royal bride. Siface offers her the throne and apologizes for his previous behavior. Now Ismene comes back and asks Viriate to punish her. However, she hugs her as a sign of forgiveness. She brings Ismene together with her admirer Erminio. At the end of the opera, the choir repeats its song of praise for the new queen.

== Development ==
Metastasio wrote this adaptation of de:Domenico David’s La forza della virtù one year before his first original libretto, Didone abbandonata. Although Metastasio set the plot in ancient Numidia, the original story had nothing to do with the historical Syphax and was actually about king Peter of Castile, based in an account in volume four of the fifteen volume Historia della perdita e reaquisto dell Spagna accupata da Mori (Story of the loss and recovery of the Kingdom of Spain occupied by the Moors) by Bartolomeo de Rogatis. in 1353 Peter was compelled to make a diplomatic marriage with Blanche of Bourbon although he loved María de Padilla and had Blanche arrested immediately after their wedding. Maria remained his lover up to his death in 1361.

As well as relocating the story in classical North Africa, Metastasio reduced the number of characters and tightened the plot, also reducing some of the emotional impact of the work. In particular the character of Viriate was much more strongly motivated by honour in Metastasio's version than in David's. Making Syphax the main character connected the drama with works about Sophonisba, which were then very popular, and also dealt with love outside marriage and included poison in their story.

David's libretto La forza della virtù had first been set to music in Venice in 1692 by Carlo Pollarolo. It was praised of by several members of the Accademia dell’Arcadia and subsequently used by other composers including Giacomo Antonio Perti in Bologna in 1694. In 1699 Pollarola's opera Creonte tiranno di Tebe with arias by Alessandro Scarlatti was performed in Naples. Metastasio knew these versions and adapted elements of them for his own treatment. Separately from David's work, the story of Peter of Castile was retold by several French authors, including Charles Regnault in his tragicomedy Blanche de Bourbon, reyne d’Espagne (1641), Pierre de Belloy in Pierre le cruel (1772) and Voltaire in Don Pèdre, roi de Castille (1775).

In 1725 Metastasio adapted the text for a setting by Nicola Antonio Porpora, that was performed simultaneously in Venice and Milan on 26 December. He strengthened the characterisation “the perfidy of Syphax, the uprightness of Viriate, the ambition of Ismene and the magnanimous conduct of Orcano.” In addition, he removed Ismene's attack on Viriate, includec in the first version, and thus ensured a more convincing conclusion to the opera. These two Porpora versions differ slightly. The version performed in Milan was heavily edited and also contained replacement arias from older Porpora operas. While Porpora attended the performance in Milan, Metastasio attended the premiere in Venice, accompanied by Nicolò Grimaldi and Marianna Bulgarelli, the stars of Francesco Feo’s 1723 version.

== Settings to music ==
The following composers set this libretto to music:

Year	Composer	Premiere	First performed
1723	Francesco Feo	13 May 1723, Teatro San Bartolomeo	Naples
1725	Nicola Antonio Porpora	26 December 1725, Teatro Regio Ducale first version; on the same day also at the Teatro San Giovanni Crisostomo in Venice; German version (Syphax) translated by de:Johann Philipp Praetorius with recitatives by Georg Philipp Telemann (TWV 22:4) 1727 at the Oper am Gänsemarkt in Hamburg	Milan
1729	Giovanni Nicola Ranieri Redi	Summer 1729, Teatro Cocomero (Note: Italian libretto of the setting by Ranieri Redi at the Museo internazionale e biblioteca della musica.)	Florence
1730	Nicola Antonio Porpora	2 July 1730, Teatro Capranica second version, with intermezzi by Michele de Falco	Rome
1732	Giuseppe Maria Nelvi	January 1732 (Note: Italian/German libretto of the setting by Nelvi at the Goethe-Universität Frankfurt am Main.)	Frankfurt am Main
1734	Giuseppe Sellitto	4 December 1734, Teatro San Bartolomeo (according to the libretto); Teatro San Carlo (according to Corago) (Note: Siface (Various). score at the International Music Score Library Project.) Pasticcio with music by Leonardo Vinci, Nicola Antonio Porpora, Geminiano Giacomelli, Johann Adolph Hasse and others	Naples
1737	Leonardo Leo	11 May 1737, Teatro Malvezzi (Note: Italian libretto of the setting by Leo at the Museo internazionale e biblioteca della musica.) New pasticcio version Viriate in the Summer of 1740 in Pistoia; also Autumn 1740 at the Teatro Pubblico in Lucca; and Spring 1745 at the Teatro Ducale in Parma	Bologna
1737	de:Giovanni Battista Mele	Carnival 1737, Teatro de los Caños del Peral in two acts as Amor constancia y mujer	Madrid
1739	Johann Adolph Hasse	24 January 1739, Teatro San Giovanni Crisostomo (Note: Italian libretto of the setting by Hasse at the Museo internazionale e biblioteca della musica.) Libretto adapted by Domenico Lalli as Viriate	Venice
1744	Francesco Maggiore	10 October 1744, Teatro Manfredini (Note: Italian libretto of the setting by Francesco Maggiore, Rovigo 1744 at the Museo internazionale e biblioteca della musica.)	Rovigo
1748	Gioacchino Cocchi	30 May 1748, Teatro San Carlo	Naples
1752	Ignazio Fiorillo	Summer fair 1752, Hoftheater	Brunswick
1761	Domenico Fischietti	Ascension Day fair 1761, Teatro Sant’Angelo	Venice
1761	Michelangelo Valentini	Carnival 1761, Teatro Omodeo as La Viriate	Pavia
1762	Baldassare Galuppi	19 May 1762, Teatro San Salvatore (Note: Italian libretto of the setting by Galuppi at the Museo internazionale e biblioteca della musica.) as Viriate	Venice
