= Margherita Chimenti =

Italian soprano

Margherita Chimenti (sometimes Chementi), known as La Droghierina (fl. 1733–1746) was an Italian soprano. She was active for a time in London, where for George Frideric Handel she created the roles of Atalanta in Serse and Adolfo in Faramondo, both in 1738. For Giovanni Battista Pergolesi she created the role of Aquilio in Adriano in Siria in Naples in 1734. She had an extensive career in Italy as well as in London.
