= Ignazio Prota =

Italian composer and music educator

Ignazio Prota (15 September 1690 – January 1748) was an Italian composer and music educator. He was the father of composer Tommaso Prota and the grandfather of composer Gabriele Prota.

Prota was born and died in Naples, Kingdom of Naples. He taught for many years at the Conservatorio di Sant'Onofrio a Porta Capuana in Naples where two of his students were composers Matteo Capranica and Niccolò Jommelli. See: List of music students by teacher: N to Q#Ignazio Prota. He wrote mainly sacred music and produced 3 operas.

== Operas ==
- La finta fattucchiera (opera buffa, libretto by Angelo Birini), Spring 1721, Naples, Teatro dei Fiorentini)
- La vedova ingegnosa (intermezzi, libretto by Tommaso Mariani, 12 July 1735, Naples, Teatro S. Bartolomeo)
- La camilla (opera buffa, libretto by Antonio Palomba, 1737, Naples, Teatro Nuovo)
