= Francesco Barsanti =

Italian composer

Francesco Barsanti (1690–1775) was an Italian flautist, oboist and composer. He was born in 1690 in the Tuscan city of Lucca, but spent most of his life in London and Edinburgh.

== Biography ==
Very little is known about Barsanti's background. His father may or may not have been the opera librettist Giovanni Nicolao Barsanti (Il Temistocle) but this has never been proven. He studied law in Padua as a young man, but abandoned it to pursue a career in music. In 1714 Barsanti emigrated to London with Francesco Geminiani, another musician from Lucca who was several years his senior. He played oboe and recorder, and soon obtained a post in the opera orchestra at the Haymarket where Handel's operas were being produced. Nerici reports that he returned briefly to Lucca in 1717 and again in 1718 to play in the Festival of the Holy Cross, 'for a very high salary.'

According to Hawkins and other authorities, in 1735, Barsanti left London for Edinburgh in Scotland, where he obtained a post as a 'Master' with the Edinburgh Musical Society. He stayed in Scotland for eight years, during which time he benefitted from the support (moral if not financial) of the young Lady Erskine (Charlotte Hope) (1720-1788), and married a commoner named 'Jean', about whom nothing else is known. The fortunes of the EMS were less than stellar at that time; in 1740 the Society was obliged to cut Barsanti's salary from £50 per year to £25, and over the next three years, it refused two of Barsanti's requests for a raise. Barsanti finally returned to London some time after 1743, with his wife and daughter Jane (known as 'Jenny'), but found that he has lost his place in musical society in London and was obliged to take a post as a violist in Handel's opera orchestra. He drew little income from his earlier compositions, and the two works he composed after his return to London brought him almost nothing.

He suffered a stroke in 1772, on the eve of his daughter Jenny's début at Covent Garden, and died three years later, sometime between May 1 and 4, 1775 (see Burney, F.). He was cared for to the end of his life by his daughter Jenny, a well-known actress upon the London and Dublin stages.

== Musical legacy ==
Barsanti is known today primarily for his set of six solo sonatas for alto recorder (Opus 1). These sonatas were re-discovered in the late 1940s by Walter Bergmann, who published three of them for Schott and became an enthusiastic promoter of Barsanti throughout his career. The sonatas are particularly appreciated by recorder players because they are highly idiomatic. Bergmann is quoted as saying that they "not only show unusual knowledge of the recorder, as one would expect from a master of that instrument, but also high musical imagination. As musical creations, they are not inferior to any other recorder sonatas, including Handel's; technically, with their refined original phrasing, they are better."

He is also known among practitioners of traditional folk music for the 28 Scots airs in his A Collection of Old Scots Tunes, which he arranged for harpsichord or solo melody instrument with figured bass. This work was dedicated to Lady Erskine.

Barsanti's other works are less known but show a range of musical style and mastery of form that is impressive. His Nine Overtures (c. 1730, publisher unknown) include works in the French, German, and Italian styles; his ten concerti grossi (op. 3) contain fugal elements as well as influences from the sonata da chiesa form, and feature an interesting concertino group of horns and timpani, with the strings in the ripieno. Finally, the Sei Antifones ("Six Antiphonies"), which are among Barsanti's last published works, show Barsanti as a mature composer in a reflective, contemplative mood. They were composed, according to Stenhouse shortly before his departure from Scotland in 1743, and were dedicated to ~20-year-old Lady Catherine Charteris, possibly written at her request, in the style of Palestrina.

== List of works ==
=== Sonatas ===
- 6 Sonatas for Flute [Recorder] and Continuo Op. 1 (1727, Walsh & Hare, London)
- 6 Sonatas for German [transverse] Flute and Continuo Op. 2 (1728, Ben Cooke, London; 1732 I. Walsh [as 'opus 3'], London)
- Six Sonatas for two violins, violincello and thorough bass made out of Geminiani's solos (no date, Ben Cooke, London

=== Orchestral works ===
- 10 Concerti Grossi Op. 3 (1742, Alexander Baillie, Edinburgh)
- Nove Overture a quattro. Due Violini, Viola e Basso (c. 1730; publisher unknown)
- 6 Concertos da notturni op. 6 (a set of six concertos grosso arranged from sonatas by Giovanni Battista St-Martini [Sammartini] (these were published by I. Walsh in a number of different printings, only some of which show Barsanti's name on the title page).

=== Motets ===
- 6 Antiphons Op. 5 (c. 1742, later published by [Peter] Welcker, London, date unknown, but no earlier than 1762)
  - RISM 806149836 Ne reminiscaris Domine Delicta nostra
  - RISM 806149882 Inter iniquos projecerunt me
  - RISM 806149837 Asperges me
  - RISM 806149838 Agios o Theos
  - RISM 806149839 De profundis
  - RISM 806149840 Lauda Jerusalem

=== Other ===
- A Collection of Old Scot Tunes (1742, Alexander Baillie, Edinburgh)
- RISM 800259421 Fye what mean you drunken

Records of musical societies for whom he worked show that Barsanti also composed 'incidental' music for the theatre, but the pieces themselves have been lost.

== Recordings ==
- Sonate a Flauto solo con basso op.I, 1724, Arcadia Ensemble, Symphonia SY 93S18 (1994)
- Sei sonate Op. 2 per flauto traverso, Auser Musici, Carlo Ipata, soloist and director, Agorà AG 157.1 (1998)
- Six Concerti Grossi (from Sonate Notturne Op. 6 by G.B. Sammartini - 1757), Banchetto Musicale, Il Piacere, Dynamic 213 (1998)
- Concerti Grossi, Op. 3 (nos. 1, 4, 6, 7, 10), Auser Musici, Carlo Ipata, director, Tactus Records TC.690201 (2003)
- Italian Musicians In London (featuring 6 Old Scots Tunes & Sonata Op. 2 no.6), Arts Production 471412 (1995/2006)
- Play me my songs (featuring Overture Op. 4 no. 2), Il Falcone Ensemble, Dynamic 612 (2008)
- Edinburgh 1742 - Barsanti & Handel (featuring Concerti Grossi Op. 3 nos. 1-5), Ensemble Marsyas, Linn CKD567 (2017)
