= Livietta e Tracollo =

- Opera buffa by Giovanni Battista Pergolesi
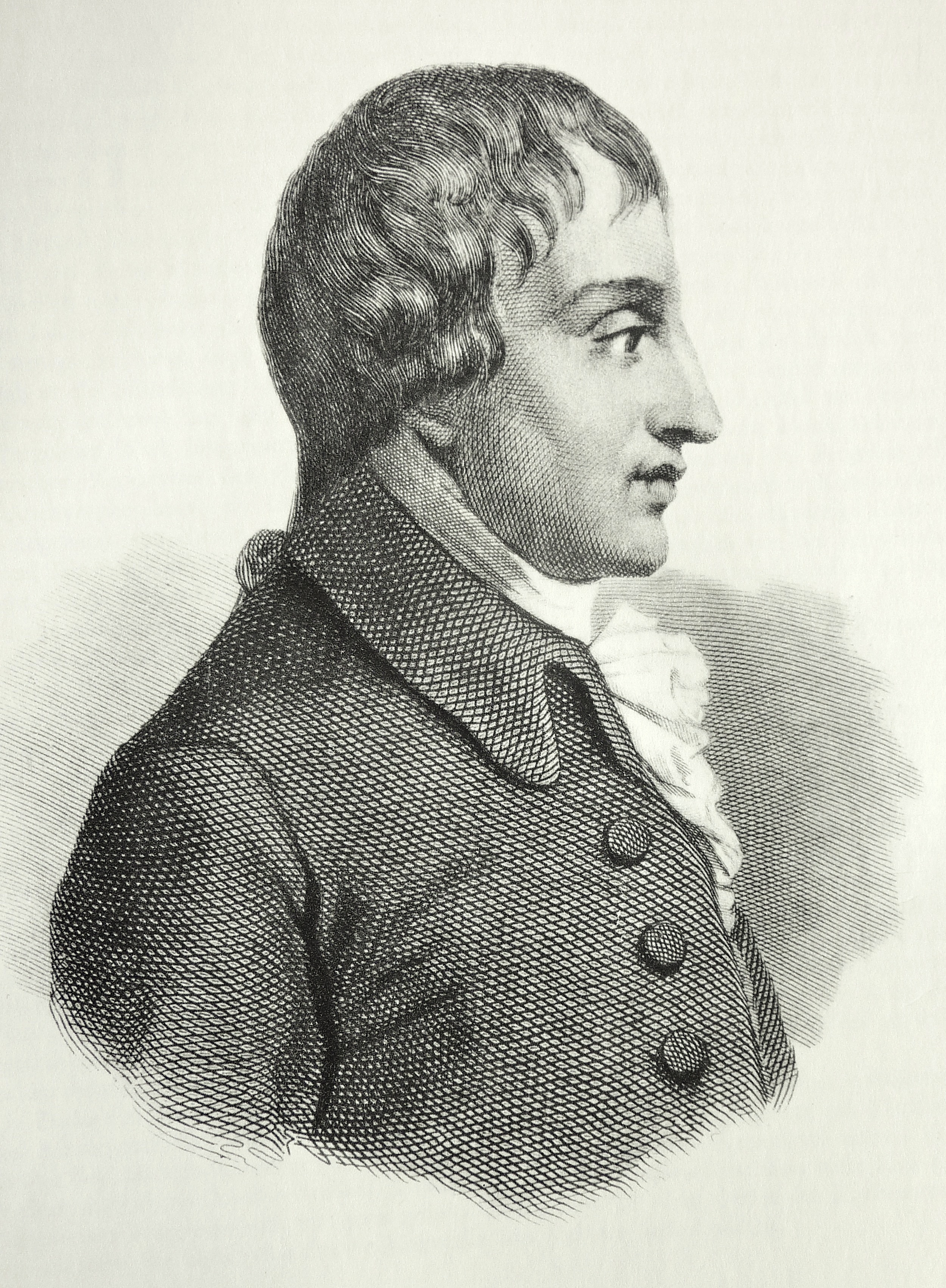
- Pergolesi, the opera's composer
- Librettist: Tommaso Mariani
- Language: Italian
- Premiere: 25 October 1734; Teatro San Bartolomeo, Naples

La contadina astuta, or Livietta e Tracollo, is an opera buffa composed by Giovanni Battista Pergolesi to a libretto by Tommaso Mariani. It was originally composed as an intermezzo for Pergolesi's opera Adriano in Siria but subsequently became popular in its own right and was performed throughout Europe. It premiered along with Adriano in Siria on 25 October 1734 at the Teatro San Bartolomeo in Naples.

== Roles ==
| Role | Voice type | Premiere cast 25 October 1734 |
|---|---|---|
| Tracollo, a prowler | buffo bass | Gioacchino Corrado |
| Livietta, a young peasant girl | soprano | Laura Monti |
| Facenda, Tracollo's friend | silent actor | |
| Fulvia, Livietta's friend | silent actor | |

== Recordings ==
- Pergolesi Livietta e Tracollo & La Serva Padrona – Nancy Argenta (Livietta) and Werner Van Mechelen (Tracollo); La Petite Bande conducted by Sigiswald Kuijken. CD. Label: Accent ACC96123D
- Pergolesi Adriano In Siria (including the intermezzo Livietta e Tracollo) – Monica Bacelli (Livietta) and Carlo Lepore (Tracollo); Accademia Bizantina conducted by Ottavio Dantone. DVD recorded live at the Teatro Pergolesi in Jesi in 2010, the tercentenary of Pergolesi's birth. Label: Opus Arte OA 1065
