= Pietro Mingotti =

Pietro Mingotti (born Venice, c. 1702; died Copenhagen, 28 April 1759) was an Italian impresario active across continental Europe. His brother, Angelo, formed an opera company in Prague around 1732, consisting of three male singers and five females; Pietro quickly followed suit, and the two troupes achieved European-wide success (though mostly in German and Austrian cities), sometimes performing together. Pietro's company, the more high-profile of the two, at times included Christoph Willibald Gluck and Giuseppe Sarti as members. Most of the works performed belonged to the genre of opera seria, though opere buffe were also given. Mezzo-soprano Maria Giustina Turcotti was a member of his company from 1746-1750.

After performances at the coronation of Franz I at Frankfurt (Maria Theresa's husband) in 1745, and at a royal wedding at Dresden in 1747 (when Gluck's Le nozze d'Ercole e d'Ebe, with the composer conducting, was performed), Mingotti's troupe were invited to Copenhagen by Queen Louise in the same year. The company's repertory for the Danish court included not only operas but also ballets. Sarti joined the troupe in December 1752 as music director after Gluck left during 1750. Severe financial difficulties forced Pietro to end his contract with the court at Copenhagen in 1755, and he died impoverished four years later in the Danish capital. Little is known of Angelo Mingotti's later career; from 1743 until 1751 the Oper am Gänsemarkt was used by Angelo Mingotti, performing Italian operas.
