= Adriano in Siria (Pergolesi) =

- Opera seria by G. B. Pergolesi
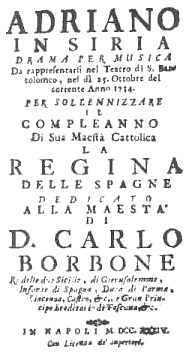
- Title page of the libretto
- Librettist: Metastasio
- Language: Italian
- Based on: Adriano in Siria
- Premiere: 25 October 1734; Teatro San Bartolomeo, Naples

Adriano in Siria is an opera by Giovanni Battista Pergolesi setting Metastasio's libretto of the same name. It was the third of his four opere serie, premiered at Teatro San Bartolomeo in Naples on 25 October 1734. It has a historical subject. Adriano is the Italian name for the Roman emperor Hadrian. Pergolesi also provided a comic intermezzo La contadina astuta, later better known as Livietta e Tracollo, to a libretto by Tommaso Mariani.

Pergolesi was only 24 years old when he began to work on Metastasio's libretto in 1734. The score is dedicated to the new monarch, but was written expressly to mark the 42nd birthday of the Queen of Spain, Elisabetta Farnese. He made many changes to Metastasio's original text, largely for the famous mezzo-soprano castrato, Gaetano Majorano, known as Caffarelli. Eventually no more than 10 arias were left to be set among the 27 originally written by Metastasio, the rest having been widely replaced by different texts.

== Roles ==
Role	Voice type	Premiere cast, 25 October 1734
Adriano, the Roman Emperor	soprano (en travesti)	Maria Marta Monticelli
Emirena, daughter of Osroa and the betrothed of Farnaspe	soprano	Maria Giustina Turcotti
Farnaspe, a mutual friend of Osroa, a prince	soprano castrato	Gaetano Majorano "Caffarelli"
Osroa, the Parthian King	tenor	Francesco Tolve
Sabina, betrothed to Emperor Adriano	soprano	Catterina Fumagalli
Aquilio, Adriano's confidant, secretly loves Sabina	soprano (en travesti)	Margherita Chimenti

== Synopsis ==
In Antioch, in ancient Syria, a celebration is held for the victorious Roman emperor, Adriano, who has defeated the Parthians. The Parthian king, Osroa, and Prince Farnaspe, friend of Osroa, present themselves to Adriano, and reveal to the Emperor that during the battle, the Romans had captured Osroa's daughter, Emirena, who is betrothed to Farnaspe.

By the time that information is revealed, Adriano is already in love with Emirena, though he is engaged to Princess Sabina. To make matters more complicated, Aquilio, Adriano's confidant, secretly loves Sabina. Farnaspe requests Emirena to be freed. While making this request, he tries very hard to hide his jealousy, but Osroa cannot hide his rage.

Aquilio, who loves Sabina, tells Emirena to feign coldness towards Farnaspe in order to save Farnaspe from the Emperor's jealous anger. Farnaspe is devastated when Adriano declares Adriano's feelings to Emirena. When Sabina arrives at the scene, the Emperor feels his heart is conflicted between Sabina and Emirena. Emirena, Aquilio and Sabina lament their fates.

At night Osroa and his soldiers set fire to the Emperor's palace. Farnaspe, unjustly accused of setting the fire, throws himself into the flames to rescue Emirena. Farnaspe is taken into prison and the two lovers are reconciled. To save her relationship with the Emperor, Sabina promises to help them escape. After being confronted by Sabina, Adriano says he will give up Emirena, but she distrusts him. Aquilio, on the other hand, believes that Sabina will be his.

As Farnaspe and Emirena escaped, Farnaspe was accused of attempting to assassinate the Emperor. Emirena cannot recognise her father, who is disguised as a Roman, and defends Farnaspe by accusing the disguised Roman instead. In a rage, Adriano has all three of them thrown into prison. Adriano discovers that Sabina assisted Emirena and Farnaspe's escape, and orders Sabina into exile. Knowing that he will lose Sabina if she goes into exile, Aquilio persuades Adriano to restore Osroa to his throne and kingdom, hoping that with this magnanimous act, the grateful Parthian will give Adriano Emirena's hand. Osroa is reluctant to give Emirena to Adriano; however, Farnaspe urges Emirena to accept in order to save both Osroa and her homeland.

At the end, Aquilio's dishonesty is exposed. Sabina capitulates and gives her permission for Adriano to marry Emirena, but Adriano, much affected by Sabina's kindness, promises to marry Sabina, restores Osroa to his throne, consents to the union of Farnaspe and Emirena, and pardons Aquilio.

== Recordings ==
- CD Jolanta Emilian (Farnaspe), Gloria Banditelli (Emirena), Susanna Anselmi (Adriano), Daniela Dessì (Sabina), Ezio Di Cesare (Osroa), Lucia Mazzaria (Aquilio), Orchestra dell'Opera da camera di Roma, Marcello Panni, Bongiovanni 1986
- DVD Pergolesi Spring Festival, Jesi, Ancona Marina Comparato (Adriano), Lucia Cirillo (Emirena), Annamaria Dell'Oste (Farnaspe), Nicole Heaston (Sabina), Stefano Ferrari (Osroa) & Francesca Lombardi (Aquilio Tribuno) Accademia Bizantina, Ottavio Dantone (conductor) & Ignacio García (director) 2012
- CD Franco Fagioli (Farnaspe), Romina Basso (Emirena), Yuriy Mynenko (Adriano), Dilyara Idrisova (Sabina), Juan Sancho (Osroa), Cigdem Soyarslan (Aquilio) Capella Cracoviensis, Jan Tomasz Adamus Decca Classics 2016
