= Ernst Christoph Dressler =

German composer and music theorist

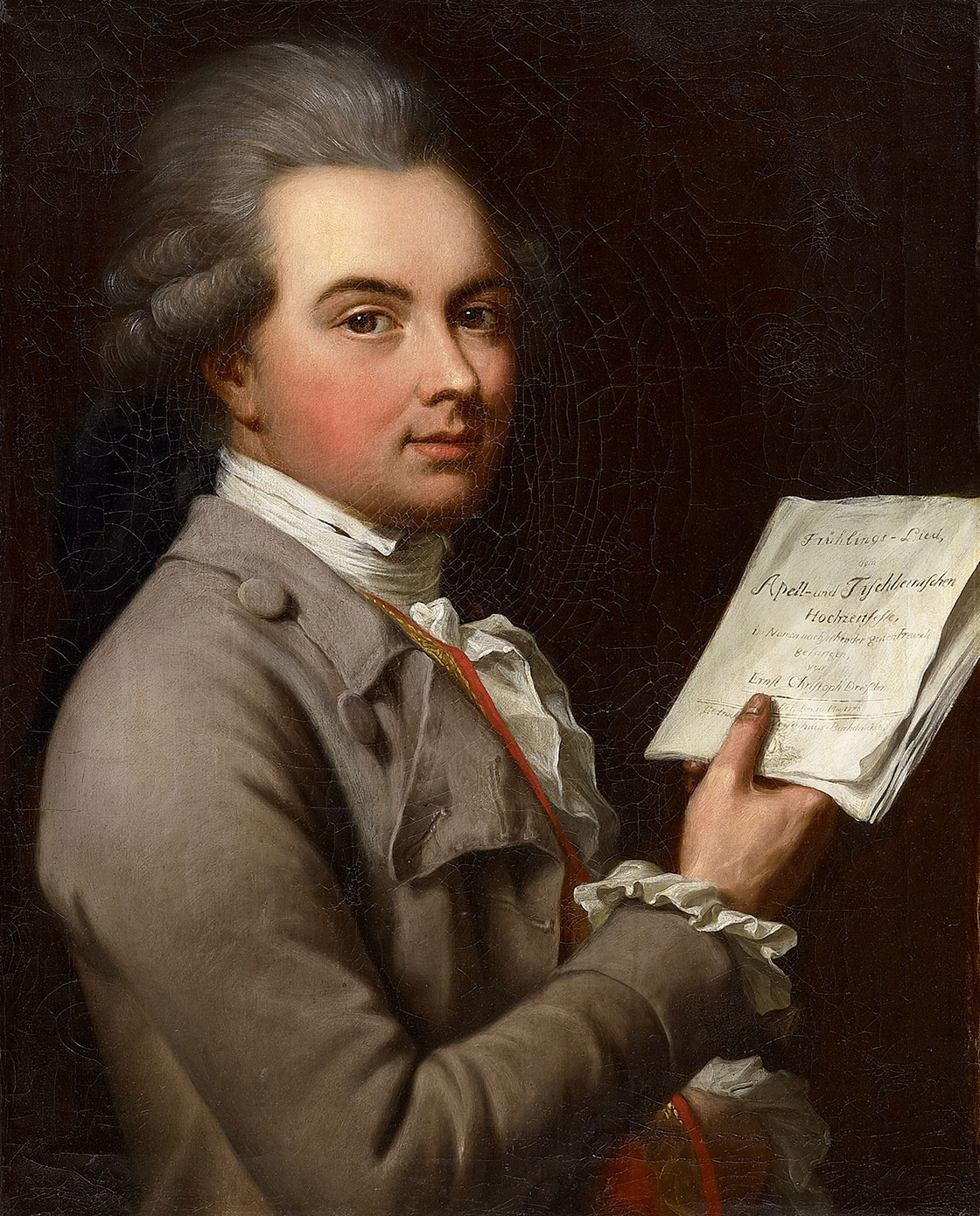
- Portrait by Johann Heinrich Tischbein, 1780
- Born: 23 September 1734; Greußen, near Sondershausen
- Died: 6 April 1779 (aged 44); Kassel
- Education: University of Halle; University of Jena; University of Leipzig
- Occupations: Operatic tenor; Violinist; Composer; Music theorist

Ernst Christoph Dressler (23 September 1734 – 6 April 1779) was a German composer, operatic tenor, violinist and music theorist. He began his career as a self taught singer and violinist, but eventually received vocal training from the renowned Italian opera singer Maria Giustina Turcotti. He became a musician at several courts before he moved to the Court Opera in Vienna and finally to Kassel. He is known for a march on which Beethoven based his first published composition.

== Life ==
Born in Greußen, near Sondershausen in Thuringia, to Christian Ludwig Dressler and Catherine Elizabeth Renner, Dressler studied theology, jurisprudence and German poetry at the universities of Halle, Jena and Leipzig. In Leipzig, he educated himself in playing the violin and in singing. He moved to Bayreuth, where he took lessons from the singer Maria Giustina Turcotti, training his tenor voice, and subsequently worked as a chamber musician, court singer and secretary for Margrave Friedrich Christian. When the margrave died in 1763, Dressler moved to Gotha, and in May 1764 took up similar duties for the Duke of Gotha and his wife Princess Luise Dorothea. He was a talented violinist, composer and writer, in addition to his ability as a tenor. He disapproved of the opera buffa then in vogue at Gotha, and in November 1766 he resigned or was dismissed. In February 1767 he became Kapellmeister to the Prince of Fürstenberg, not at the prince's court at Donaueschingen but at Wetzlar. In 1771, the prince returned to Bohemia; Dressler chose not to go with him. Instead, he worked as a singer at the Imperial Court Opera in Vienna. In 1774, he moved to the court opera in Kassel where he remained until his death.

Dressler married Wilhelmine Christiane Zeitz. Two of their sons also worked for the Kassel Hofkapelle. He died in Kassel on 6 April 1779, aged 44.

== Work and legacy ==
Dressler published two books of songs. His best known composition is a march which was the basis of Ludwig van Beethoven's earliest work, "Nine Variations on a March by Ernst Christoph Dressler", which was published in 1782, three years after Dressler's death.

In his works on music theory, he supported efforts to create a distinct German opera independent of Italian opera. This required the establishment of permanent opera houses in Germany, rare in Germany at the time. He considered Anton Schweitzer's 1773 opera Alceste (with a libretto by Christoph Martin Wieland) a paradigm of German opera.

== Publications ==
=== Song collections ===
- Melodische Lieder für das schöne Geschlecht (Melodious songs for the fair sex). Frankfurt, 1771
- Freundschaft und Liebe (Friendship and love). Nuremberg, 1774

=== Music theory ===
- Fragmente einiger Gedanken des musikalischen Zuschauers, die bessere Aufnahme der Musik in Deutschland betreffend (Fragments of ideas of the musical spectator, regarding a better reception of music in Germany). Gotha, 1767
- Gedanken, die Vorstellung der Alceste, ein deutsches ernsthaftes Singspiel, betreffend (Thoughts on the performance of Alceste, a German serious singspiel). Erfurt, 1774
- Theaterschule für die Deutschen das ernsthafte Singschauspiel betreffend (A theatre school for the Germans, concerning the serious sung drama). Hanover, 1777
