= Musica Toscana =

Nonprofit organisation

Musica Toscana, Inc., was a nonprofit cultural, educational, and musicological organization located in Louisville, Kentucky, that promoted the musical heritage of the Tuscan region of Italy. It was founded in 1999 under the leadership of the musicologist Robert L. Weaver, a retired faculty member of the University of Louisville. Musica Toscana was headed by Margaret M. Guarnieri after 2007. As of 2012, the organization ceased operations. It maintained a reciprocal membership with the period instrument ensemble Auser Musici of Pisa, Italy.

One of the principal reasons for the creation of Musica Toscana was the acquisition in 1984 of the private music library of the Italian Ricasoli family by the Dwight Anderson Music Library of the University of Louisville. At the time, the Ricasoli collection was one of the largest private collections of eighteenth-century music remaining in the world. The collection originated with Baron Pietro Leopoldo Ricasoli in Florence and was once in the possession of Baron Bettino Ricasoli, a founding father of the modern Italian state and one of its first prime ministers.

The principal goal of Musica Toscana was to promote music written in Tuscany, performed in Tuscany, or written by Tuscan composers active outside of Tuscany that originated from the period 1590–1850, an era of political, culture, and economic decline in the region, but one of continued musical importance that saw the birth of opera in the 1590s and the invention of the piano a century later.

Musica Toscana oversaw the publication of a series of scholarly and performing editions, the Monuments of Tuscan Music, and sponsored concerts and lectures devoted to its repertory of interest, sometimes in collaboration with Bourbon Baroque. Only four of many planned volumes of the Monuments of Tuscan Music series appeared before the dissolution of the organization.

== See also ==
- History of Tuscany
- Music of Florence
- Music of Tuscany
