= Michele Gabellone =

Italian composer

Michele Gabellone (also spelled Cabalone, Caballone, Cabelone, Cabellone, Gabbalone) (November 1692, in Naples – 19 January 1740, in Naples) was an Italian composer best known for his operas.

== Operas ==
- La Cantarina (3 Acts, commedia per musica, libretto by A. Piscopo, Carnival 1728, Naples, Teatro dei Fiorentini)
- La Ciulla o puro Chi fa freuma arriva a tutto (commedia per musica, libretto by Carlo De Palma), Spring 1728, Naples, Teatro dei Fiorentini)
- La fenta schiava, chelleta pe mmuseca (1728, Naples, Teatro dei Fiorentini)
- Ammore vò speranza (commedia per musica, libretto by De Palma, Carnival 1729, Naples, Teatro dei Fiorentini)
- Adone re di Cipro (dramma per musica, libretto by Filippo Vanstryp, Carnival 1731, Rome, Teatro Capranica)
- Li dispiette amoruse (commedia per musica, libretto by Antonio Palomba, Autumn 1731, Naples, Teatro Nuovo)
