= Pietro Auletta =

Italian composer

Pietro Antonio Auletta (1698–1771) was an Italian composer known mainly for his operas. His opera buffa Orazio gained popularity after being mis-attributed to Pergolesi as Il maestro de musica.
