= Antonio Palella =

Italian composer and harpsichordist

Antonio Palella (8 October 1692, San Giovanni a Teduccio – 7 March 1761, Naples) was an Italian composer and harpsichordist.

== Recording ==
- One concerto in Neapolitan Flute Concertos, Auser Musici, Carlo Ipata, director, Hyperion CDA67784 (2010)
