= Matteo Capranica =

Italian composer

Matteo Capranica (26 August 1708 – c. 1776) was an Italian composer.

Born in Amatrice, Capranica studied at the Conservatorio di Sant'Onofrio a Porta Capuana in Naples under Nicola Porpora, Ignazio Prota, and Francesco Feo.

After completing his studies, he worked as maestro di cappella at various churches in Naples and devoted himself to music composition of both sacred and secular works. He was for many years organist at the Naples Cathedral.

His first opera, Carlo, premiered at the Teatro Nuovo in Naples in 1736. He went on to compose eight more operas through 1753. His other works include 2 oratorios, 2 masses, 2 sonatas, a cantata, several works for harpsichord, and various arias and duets for singers.

He died in Naples.

== Sources ==
- Matteo Capranica at operone.de
