= Giuseppe de Majo =

Italian composer and organist (1697–1771)

Giuseppe de Majo (di Maio; 5 December 1697 – 18 November 1771) was an Italian composer and organist. He was the father of the composer Gian Francesco de Majo. His compositional output consists of 10 operas, an oratorio, a concerto for 2 violins, and a considerable amount of sacred music.

== Life and career ==
Born in Naples on December 5, 1967. He dedicated himself to music studies at an early age. Majo spent most of his life working in his native city. He began his studies at the age of 9 at the Conservatorio della Pietà dei Turchini, where he was a pupil of Nicola Fago and Andrea Basso. His first opera, Lo finto laccheo, premiered in 1725 at the Teatro dei Fiorentini.

In 1728, he married Teresa Manna, who was the sister of the composer Giacinto and niece of Feo. In 1732, the couple had a son, Gianfrancesco.

Majo was appointed organista soprannumerario at the Royal chapel of Naples in May 1736. There he flourished, largely due to the favouritism given to him by Queen Maria Amalia. In 1744, he succeeded Leonardo Leo as maestro di cappella at the Royal chapel. He remained in that post through 1770. He died in Naples on November 18, 1771.

== Recording ==
- 1 concerto in Neapolitan Flute Concertos, Auser Musici, Carlo Ipata, director, Hyperion CDA67784 (2010)
