= Charles Regnault =

Charles Regnault was a 17th-century French writer and playwright. He wrote Marie Stuard, reyne d'Ecosse, a play about Mary, Queen of Scots, which was performed in 1637 and printed in 1639.

== Works ==
- 1637: Marie Stuard, reyne d'Ecosse
- 1641: Les métamorphoses françoises
- 1642: Blanche de Bourbon, reyne d'Espagne: tragi-comédie
- 1639: Stances (with Jean de Rotrou and Poucet de Montauban)
