= Girolamo Abos =

Maltese-Italian composer (1715–1760)

Girolamo Abos, last name also given Avos or d'Avossa and baptized Geronimo Abos (16 November 1715 – May 1760), was a Maltese-Italian composer of both operas and church music.

Born in Valletta, Malta, son of Gian Tommaso Abos, whose father was a Frenchman from Castellane and Rosa Farrugia, Abos studied under Leonardo Leo and Francesco Durante in Naples. In 1756, he became Maestro al Cembalo (Director of Music) at the Italian Theatre in London. In 1758 he returned to Italy as a teacher at the Conservatorio della Pietà de' Turchini in Naples, where Giovanni Paisiello was one of his pupils. He wrote fourteen operas for the opera houses in Naples, Rome, and London, of which Tito Manlio (Naples, 1751) was the most successful. After 1758 he composed a good deal of church music, including seven masses and several litanies. He died in Naples. Many of his sacred works, oratorios, and the opera Pelopida have been edited by the Australian musicologist and conductor Richard Divall, and are freely available.

== List of operas composed by Abos ==
Title	Genre	Subdivisions	Libretto	Première date	Place, theatre
Le due zingare simili	opera buffa		Antonio Palomba	1742	Naples, Teatro Nuovo
Il geloso	commedia		Antonio Palomba	spring 1743	Naples, Teatro dei Fiorentini
Le furberie di Spilletto	commedia per musica	3 acts	(Première libretto, in Italian)	Carnival 1744	Florence, Teatro del Cocomero
La serva padrona	opera buffa		Gennaro Antonio Federico	Carnival 1744	Naples
La moglie gelosa	commedia		Antonio Palomba	1745	Naples, Teatro dei Fiorentini
Adriano in Siria	dramma per musica		Pietro Metastasio	Carnival 1746	Florence, Teatro della Pergola
Artaserse	dramma per musica	3 acts	Pietro Metastasio (Première libretto, in Italian)	1746	Venice, Teatro di San Giovanni Crisostomo)
Pelopida	dramma per musica	3 acts	Gaetano Roccaforte (Première libretto, in Italian)	Carnival 1747	Rome, Teatro Argentina
Alessandro nelle Indie	dramma per musica	3 acts	Pietro Metastasio (Première libretto, in Italian)	July 1747	Ancona, Teatro La Fenice
Arianna e Teseo	dramma per musica	3 acts	Pietro Pariati (Première libretto, in Italian)	26 December 1748	Rome, Teatro delle Dame
Tito Manlio	dramma per musica		Gaetano Roccaforte	30 May 1751	Naples, Teatro San Carlo
Erifile	dramma per musica	3 acts	Giovanni Battista Neri (Première libretto, in Italian)	Carnival 1752	Rome, Teatro delle Dame
Lucio Vero o sia Il Vologeso	opera seria		Apostolo Zeno	18 December 1752	Naples, Teatro San Carlo
Il Medo	dramma per musica		Carlo Innocenzo Frugoni	1753	Turin, Teatro Regio
