= International Record Review =

- Cover of International Record Review from December 2006 featuring the conductor Ilan Volkov
- Editor: Máire Taylor
- Categories: classical music
- Frequency: monthly
- Publisher: International Record Review, Ltd.
- First issue: March 2000
- Final issue: April 2015
- Country: England; United Kingdom
- Based in: London
- Language: English
- Website: www.recordreview.co.uk
- ISSN: 1468-5027

International Record Review was an independent British monthly classical music magazine.

First published in March 2000, and defunct by April 2015 according to its website, the magazine reviewed classical music CDs, DVDs and books. Its format was similar to that of its competitors, the long established Gramophone and the more recent BBC Music Magazine: CD and DVD reviews were divided into orchestral, chamber, instrumental, choral, vocal and opera. Reviews in International Record Review were more detailed than those appearing in Gramophone and BBC Music Magazine.

Each issue contained a list of new releases and at least one feature article.

Following the death in February 2015 of the magazine's publisher and the sole director of International Record Review Limited, Barry Irving, the company declared itself insolvent in letters to its associates and on its website.
