= Michelangelo Valentini =

Michelangelo Valentini (1720–1768) was an Italian composer and organist.

== Biography and work ==
Michelangelo Valentini was born in Naples, around 1720.

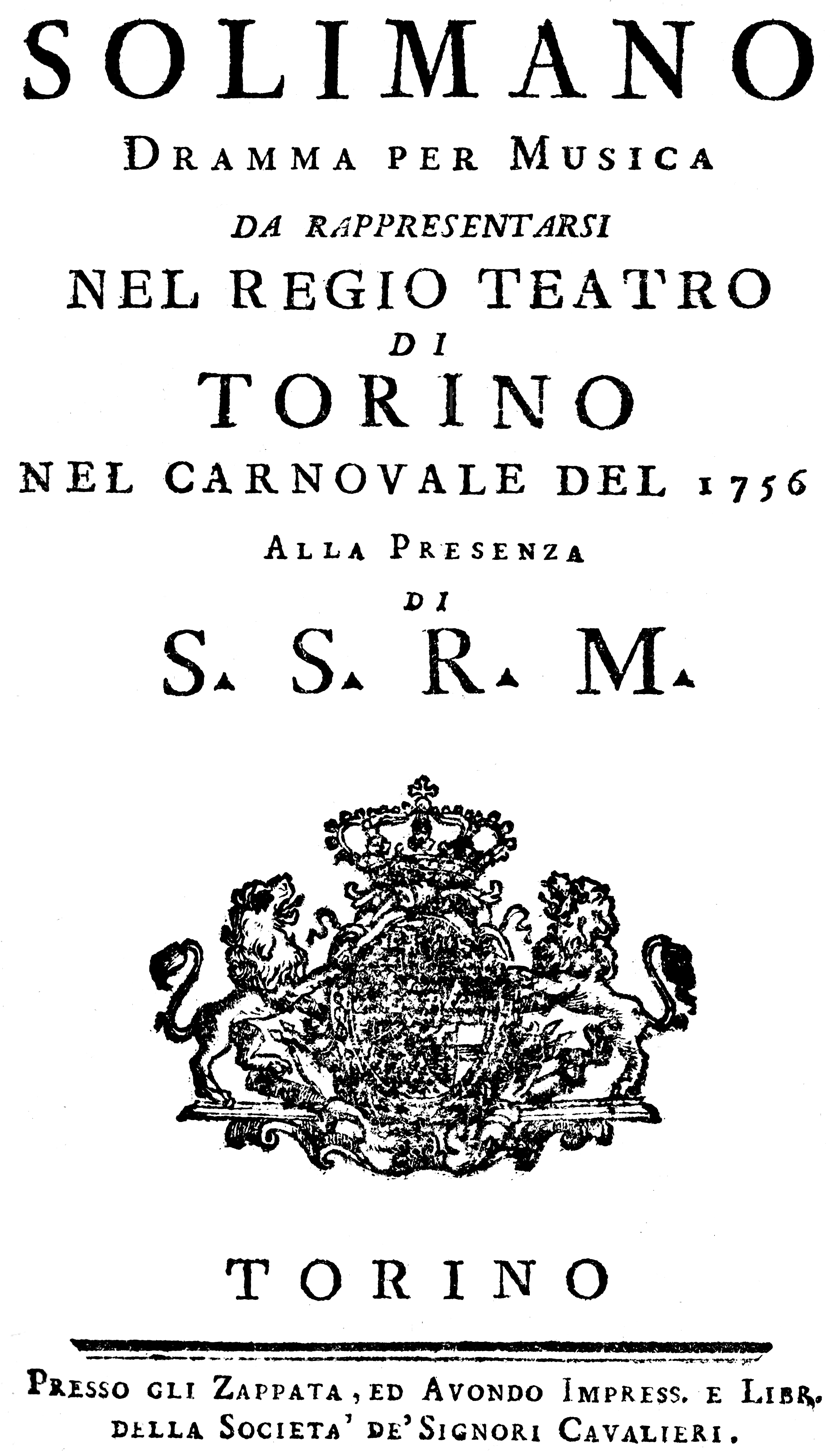
Valentini's Solimano: Title page of the libretto

He was probably a student of Leonardo Leo.

He debuted as an opera composer at the Teatro Nuovo (Naples) with the comic opera Il Demetrio. He remained in Naples for most of his life, associated with the Teatro dei Fiorentini, where many of his operas were performed. His works include the cantata Regina Valentini, eight operas, and twenty independent arias. His opera using the plot of La clemenza di Tito, in this case using a libretto by Antonio Palomba, was watched by Mozart in 1770, some 20 years before Mozart's opera seria of the same name.

Michelangelo Valentini died in Naples at some point after 1768.

== Operas ==
- Il Demetrio (libretto by Antonio Palomba). Opera buffa. First performance in Naples, 1745.
- La Villana nobile (Antonio Palomba). Comic opera. Naples, 1748.
- La clemenza di Tito (Antonio Palomba). Dramatic opera. Bologna, 1743.
- Adriano in Siria (Pietro Metastasio). Dramatic opera. Bologna, 1753.
- Andromache (Apostolo Zeno). Dramatic opera. Milan, 1754.
- Solimano (Giovanni Ambrogio Migliavacca). Dramatic opera. Turin, 1756.
- La sconfitta di Darío (Carlo Deodato Morbilli). Dramatic opera. Genoa, 1757.
- Viriate (Pietro Metastasio). Dramatic opera. Pavia, 1761.
