= Gaetano Latilla =

Italian opera composer (1711-1788)

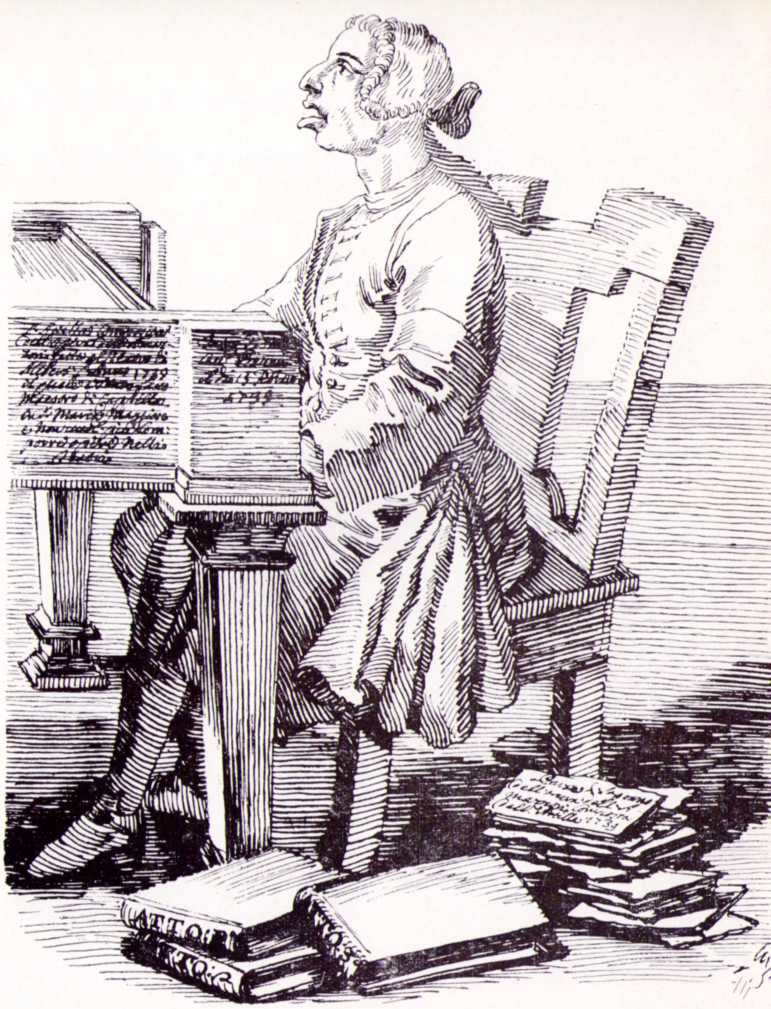
Caricature of Latilla by Pier Leone Ghezzi, 1739

Gaetano Latilla (12 January 1711 – 15 January 1788) was an Italian opera composer, the most important of the period immediately preceding Niccolò Piccinni (his nephew).

Latilla was born in Bari, and studied at the Loreto Conservatory in Naples. He began writing comic operas for the Teatro dei Fiorentini in Naples in 1732, and is best known for his settings of Gismondo (Rome, 1737) and Madama Ciana (Rome, 1738). These two works, along with two by Rinaldo da Capua, formed the core of the traveling Italian comic opera repertory of the 1740s and early 1750s. He also wrote some opere serie, the first of which was a setting of Demofoonte (Venice, 1738).

He died in Naples.

== See also ==
- List of operas by Gaetano Latilla
