= Giuseppe Sellitti =

Italian opera composer

Giuseppe Sellitto or Sellitti (Naples, 1700-1777) was an Italian opera composer. He is remembered for his Egyptian opera Nitocri, and intermezzi including Il Cinese rimpatriato and La Franchezza delle donne.

== Recordings ==
- Aria: Anche un misero arboscello (from the opera Nitocri) on Venezia recital by Max Emanuel Cencic (countertenor) Il Pomo d'Oro, Riccardo Minasi, Virgin 2013
