= Gennaro Federico =

Neapolitan Librettist

Gennaro Antonio Federico (died Naples, 1744) was a Neapolitan poet and opera librettist. He is best remembered for his collaborations with G. B. Pergolesi including La serva padrona.

== Libretti ==
- La Zita (opera buffa; set by Costantino Roberto 1731)
- Lo frate 'nnamorato (commedia musicale; set by Giovanni Battista Pergolesi 1732)
- L'Ippolita (opera buffa; set by Nicola Conti 1733)
- L'Ottavio (commedia per musica; set by Gaetano Latilla 1733, set by Pietro Alessandro Guglielmi 1760)
- La serva padrona (intermezzo; set by Giovanni Battista Pergolesi 1733, set by Girolamo Abos 1744, set by Pietro Alessandro Guglielmi 1780, Giovanni Paisiello 1781 )
- Gl'Ingannati (commedia per musica; set by Gaetano Latilla, 1734)
- La marina de Chiaja (chelleta, revision of an earlier libretto; set by Pietro Pulli, 1734)
- Il Flaminio (commedia per musica; set by Giovanni Battista Pergolesi 1735 )
- Il Filippo (opera buffa; set by Costantino Roberto 1735 )
- I due baroni (opera buffa; set by Giuseppe Sellitto 1736 )
- La Rosaura (opera buffa; set by Domenico Sarro, 1736)
- La Teodora (opera sacra; set by Papebrochio Fungoni, 1737)
- Gismondo (commedia per musica; set by Gaetano Latilla, 1737)
- Da un disordine nasce un ordine (opera buffa; set by Vincenzo Legrenzio Ciampi, 1737)
- Il conte (dramma giocoso per musica; set by Leonardo Leo 1738 )
- Inganno per inganno (opera buffa; set by Nicola Bonifacio Logroscino, 1738)
- La locandiera (scherzo comico per musica; set by Pietro Auletta, 1738)
- Ortensio (commedia per musica; set by Giovan Gualberto Brunetti, 1739)
- Amor vuol sofferenza (commedia per musica; set by Leonardo Leo 1739, and by Nicola Bonifacio Logroscino come La finta frascatana, 1751)
- La Beatrice (opera buffa; set by Vincenzo Legrenzio Ciampi, 1740)
- L'Alidoro (commedia per musica; set by Leonardo Leo, 1740; set by Matteo Capranica come L'Aurelio, 1748)
- L'Alessandro (commedia per musica; set by Leonardo Leo, 1741)
- La Lionara (opera buffa; set by Vincenzo Legrenzio Ciampi 1742, and Nicola Bonifacio Logroscino 1743 )
- Il fantastico od Il nuovo Chisciotte (commedia per musica after Miguel de Cervantes; set by Leonardo Leo, 1743)
- Il copista burlato (commedia; set by Antonio Sacchini, 1759)
