= L'ambizione delusa =

L'ambizione delusa may refer to:

- L'ambizione delusa, an adaptation of La commedia in commedia set by Rinaldo di Capua to a text by Giovanni Barlocci in 1738
- L'ambizione delusa, opera from List of operas by Galuppi 1741
- L'ambizione delusa (Leo), opera by Leonardo Leo 1742
- L'ambizione delusa, intermezzo by Marcello Bernardini 1779, Rome
- L'ambizione delusa, opera from List of operas by Pacini
- L'ambizione delusa, intermezzo 2 acts from List of operas by Sarti 1779
