= Malfi =

Malfi may refer to:

- Amalfi, a town and comune in Italy
- Duchy of Amalfi, an independent state centered on Amalfi during the 10th and 11th centuries
- Ronald Malfi (born 1977), American novelist
- Serena Malfi (born 1985), Italian operatic mezzosoprano

== See also ==
- The Duchess of Malfi (disambiguation)
