= Serena Malfi =

Italian operatic mezzo-soprano (born 1985)

Serena Malfi (born 19 July 1985 in Pomigliano d'Arco) is an Italian operatic mezzo-soprano.

She specializes in the Baroque, Classical and bel canto repertoire, in particular Mozart and Rossini. She studied at the Santa Cecilia Conservatory and Accademia Nazionale di Santa Cecilia in Rome. She made her debut in 2009 in Salieri's La grotta di Trofonio at the Winterthur Festival and in the same year went on to sing the role of Rosina in Rossini's The Barber of Seville at the Zürich Opera House. In 2013 he sang at the Opéra Garnier in Paris in the lead role in Rossini's La Cenerentola.

She has also sung in Mozart's La clemenza di Tito and Don Giovanni, Pergolesi's Il Flaminio and La Salustia and Handel's Agrippina.

Since 2010 she has performed in many opera houses, including: the Vienna State Opera; the Teatro Comunale, Florence; the Teatro Colón, Buenos Aires; the Teatro Real, Madrid; and the Palau de les Arts Reina Sofía, Valencia.
