= Music collections in Pistoia =

Music collections in Pistoia show a chronological profile of the musical production of the city.

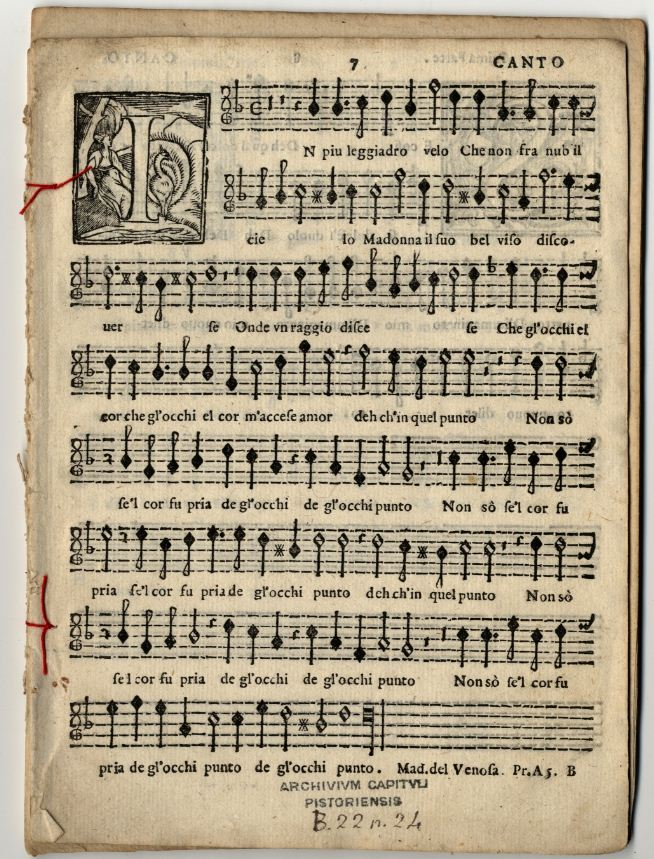
Printed music in the Musicalis Library in the Capitolary Archive

== History ==
The first testimonies were related to the sacred performances of the Passion of Christ which were located in the Loggia del Giuramento, and were a central moment in the life of the citizens because the entire population was involved in the spectacular staging. Beginning in the 1500s, the Chappell of the Cathedral became the main musical organization, next to the single parishes and churches of the Dominican order and of San Filippo, the latter attended by nobility. Starting in the 1600s, the Rospigliosi family was central to the music scene in Pistoia, together with Melani and Pasquini. With their donations they succeeded in ensuring that the Chappell always continued to excel. In this period, the dynasties of composers Gherardeschi and Brunetti, who dominated the music in Pistoia even in the 1700s, were affirmed. The entire activity of the Chappell and the works of its masters, made up of compositions from scratch such as the performance and collection of the works of other composers, has been merged, and is today available for consult, in the preserved documents of the Biliotheca Musicalis of the Archive of the Chapter and at the Forteguerriana Library (Biblioteca Forteguerriana), while the materials produced by the single parishes are today found in the State Archive (Archivio di Stato), in the Leoniana Library at the Vescovile Seminary, the Old Library of Canonici (today at the Archive of the Chapter), and at the Dominican Library.

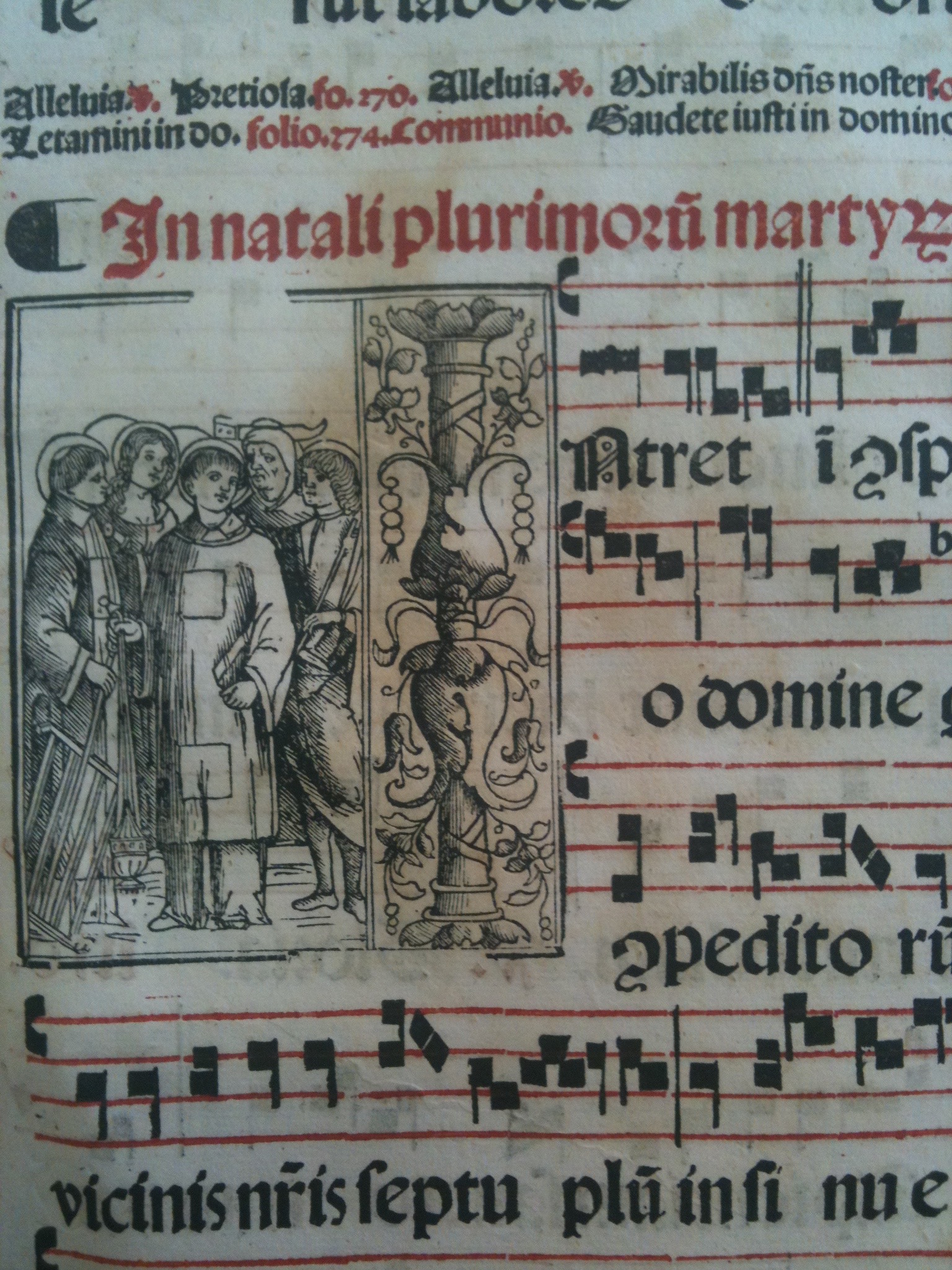
Music and square notation in the State Archive in Pistoia

Beginning in the 1600s, the large nobile families also began to patron the production of lyric opera, especially in the academic scene (The Accademia dei Risvegliati constructed its theater in 1677). Melani made their descendants acquire musical skills: Jacopo, Alessandro and Atto became esteemed composers and musicians in Italy and in France. However, the Rospigliosi family is still the family that left the greatest trace and documentation of operatic activities in Pistoia in the 1600s and on: the Rospigliosi Collection (today divided between the Archive of the Chapter and the Forteguerriana Library) attests to the great musical vitality of the citizens with a collection of music of the most influential composers in the world, performed in Pistoia until the end of the 1800s, which was the century in which the Rospigliosi salon, where many celebrities gathered, was one of the major cultural centers at the local level. Parallel to the secular production, we cannot forget the production of sacred music (as is attested by the Music Collection of the Seminary, the Collection of the Parish of the Madonna dell'Umiltà (Mary of Umility), and the musical documents of the Fabroniana Library, rich in theoretical and historical texts that were especially pertinent to the 1700s). A composer of the 1800s, Teodulo Mabellini, for example, wrote both lyric operas and sacred music, and some of his compositions are today preserved as autographs in the Forteguerriana Library and in the Archive of the Chapter (see the Sources of Mabellini). In the 1800s, the Borgognoni Philharmonic and the School of Music and Dance were founded (later named Mabellini). The Philharmonic conducted an intense production of music and diffusion of sophisticated music, thanks to the many band arrangements, today preserved in their archive. The School is still functioning today. Beginning in the 1900s, the Philharmonic also accompanied the caffé concerto (the music produced for this performances are now at the Globo Cinema) and are still active today (the archive of the director Giuseppe Da Prato have documented the production of the band since 1973). In the 1900s, the musical possessions of Pistoia were enriched by the donations of many private citizens, who entrusted their books regarding music to the Forteguerriana Library (Chiappelli Collectioni, Martini Collection, Bellini Collection), to the Leoniana Library at the Seminary (Mazzei Collection and the Collection of Aldo Pacini, a collector, who possessed some autographs and antique printed editions). An exceptional testimony of music of the 1900s is at the Mabellini School of Music and Dance: the autographed arrangements by Carlo Savina for two concerts in Pistoia of the music of Nino Rota performed with the Orchestra of Rome of RAI in 1981.

== List of music collections ==
- Archive of the Chapter, address: vicolo Sozomeno 3, preserves:
  - Musical documents of the Old Canonical Library: possesses the oldest testimonies of sacred music in Pistoia;
  - Bibliotheca Musicalis: preserves the greatest number of operas produced and collected by the Chappell of the Cathedral;
  - A branch of the Rospigliosi Collection referred to most for sacred music of the 1700-1800s.
- State Archive of Pistoia, address: piazza delle Scuole Normali. Preserves antique music and some printed editions from the 1500s and 1600s.
- Dominican Library, address: piazza San Domenico 1. Preserves liturgical music from the 1700s and 1800s.
- Fabroniana Library, address: piazzetta San Filippo 1. Preserves music and essays regarding music theory, especially of the 1700s.
- Forteguerriana Library, address: piazza della Sapienza. Preserves:
  - Musical documents pertinent to the activities of the capella of the Cathedral between the 1500s and the 1800s;
  - A branch of the Rospigliosi Collection especially pertinent to the operatic and secular music
  - Alberto Chiappelli Collection, with numerous musical publications;
  - Martini Collection, contains numerous librettos and publications of musical theater;
  - Vittorio Bellini Collection, contains many musical publications and musical periodicals from the 1900s.
- Leoniana Library of the Bishop's Seminary, address: via Puccini 36. Preserves:
  - Musical documents gathered in the parishes;
  - Musical documents originating from the parishes of the Madonna dell'Umiltà;
  - Music Collection of the Seminary, preserves sacred and secular music mostly from the 1700-1800s;
  - Collection of the collector, Aldo Pacini, also contains autographs (the opera Evelia by Virginio Cappelli, 1885) and priceless printed editions from the 1700s;
  - Mazzei Collection, gathered essays of musical subjects and discs of classical music.
- Borgognoni Philharmonic, address: parterre di piazza San Francesco 9. Contains the relative collections regarding its activity:
  - Archive of the Philharmonic, contains the most antique documents;
  - Cinema Globo Collection, preserves the music that the Band produced for the caffé concerto;
  - Giuseppe Da Prato Collection, preserves the successive documents from 1973.
- Mabellini School of Music and Dance, address: via Dalmazia 356. Contains:
  - Musical Documents of the school;
  - Rota-Savina Collection, contains the autographes arrangements by Carlo Savina for a concert with music by Nino Rota in 1981, performed by the Orchestra of Roma of RAI conducted by Savina in Pistoia in 1981.
