= Il prigionier superbo =

Opera by Giovanni Battista Pergolesi

- Opera seria by G. B. Pergolesi
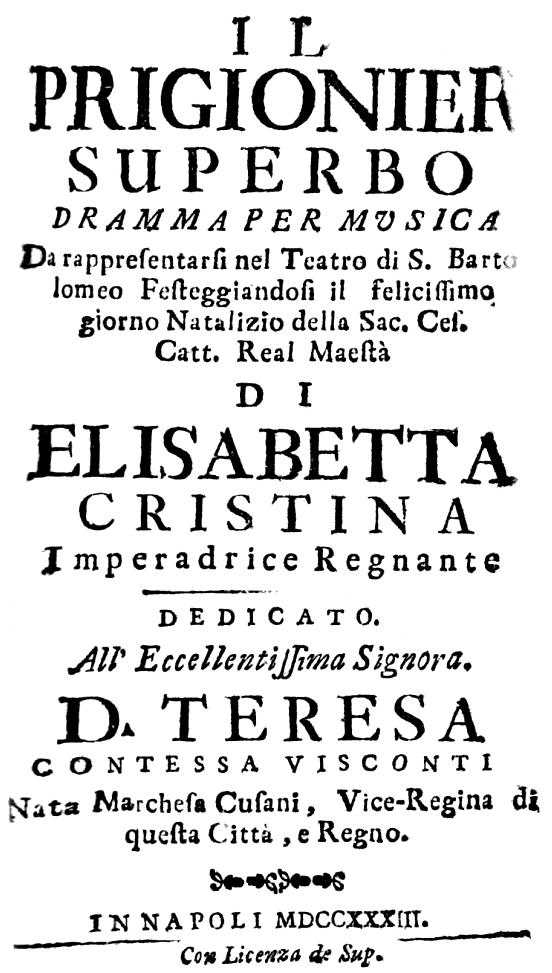
- Title page of the libretto
- Translation: The Proud Prisoner
- Librettist: Gennaro Antonio Federico
- Language: Italian
- Based on: La fede tradita e vendicata by Francesco Silvani
- Premiere: 5 September 1733; Teatro San Bartolomeo, Naples

Il prigionier superbo (English: The Proud Prisoner) is an opera seria in three acts, composed by Giovanni Battista Pergolesi to a libretto attributed to Gennaro Antonio Federico, and based on an earlier libretto by Francesco Silvani for Gasparini's opera, La fede tradita e vendicata. It was premiered at the Teatro San Bartolomeo in Naples on 5 September 1733 and received further performances in October. The opera, with its labyrinthine plot involving the rivalry of Metalce (King of the Goths) and Viridate (Prince of Denmark) for the hand of Rosmene (a Norwegian princess whose father is Metalce's prisoner), soon sank into oblivion, but its comic intermezzo, La serva padrona (also by Pergolesi) was to achieve considerable success when performed on its own.

== Performance history ==
Il prigionier superbo was Pergolesi's second opera seria. The libretto has been attributed to Gennaro Antonio Federico and was based on the one written by Francesco Silvani for Francesco Gasparini's 1704 opera, La fede tradita e vendicata (Faith Betrayed and Vindicated). It was commissioned to celebrate Empress Elisabeth Christine's birthday and premiered at the Teatro San Bartolomeo in Naples on 5 September 1733.

The performance also marked the re-opening of Naples' theatres following the violent earthquake which had struck the area on 29 November 1732. The opera continued to be performed in October of that year along with its comic intermezzo, La serva padrona. Il prigionier proved unsuccessful in its day and has only been rarely revived. However, La serva padrona performed on its own eventually went on to enjoy fame throughout Europe for many years after its premiere.

The first production of Il prigionier in modern times took place at the Teatro Pergolesi in Jesi on 27 September 1997 with a score revised by Marcello Panni. The next major revival came on 11 September 2009, again at the Teatro Pergolesi, this time using a new critical edition of the score prepared by Claudio Toscani for the Fondazione Pergolesi-Spontini. The production was directed by Henning Brockhaus with Corrado Rovaris conducting the Accademia Barocca de I Virtuosi Italiani performing on period instruments.

== Roles ==
Roles, voice types, premiere cast
Role	Voice type	Premiere cast: 5 September 1733
Sostrate, King of Norway, Rosmene's father	tenor	Giovanni Battista Pinacci
Rosmene, Sostrate's daughter	contralto	Anna Bagnolesi
Metalce, King of the Goths	contralto (en travesti)	Lucia Grimani
Ericlea, Daughter of Clearco, the former King of Norway	soprano	Rosa Mancini
Viridate, Royal Prince of Denmark	soprano castrato	Antonio Castoro
Micisda, Prince of Bohemia and Ericlea's lover	soprano (en travesti)	Anna Maria Mazzoni

== Synopsis ==
Sostrate, having disposed of the slain king Clearco and made himself king of Norway, has himself been overthrown by Metalce, who plans to marry Clearco's daughter Ericlea and who promises Rosmene, daughter of the 'proud prisoner' Sostrate, to his ally Viridate, already in love with her. Ericlea wavers between her lover Micisda and her desire to preserve the kingdom, but when she overhears Metalce courting Rosmene she enlists Micisda in plotting revenge. Sostrate, offered his freedom, nevertheless urges Rosmene to spurn Metalce.

Metalce tells Viridate that Rosmene will never forgive his role in overthrowing her father, and advises him to return to Denmark. The advice becomes a command when the angry Viridate learns from Ericlea that Metalce is his rival. Metalce again asks Sostrate to persuade Rosmene, offering to return his kingdom, but Sostrate treads on the proffered crown. When Viridate draws his sword to defend him from Metalce, both are condemned to death, but the distraught Rosmene, offered the choice of saving either of the two, writes Viridate's name on the death certificate.

Informed of the wedding preparations by Ericlea and shown the death certificate by Micisda, the two prisoners denounce Rosmene's treachery. Meanwhile, Ericlea convinces Metalce that Rosmene and Sostrate will now accept his offer if he tells her Viridate has accepted a deal to renounce her in exchange for exile. Hearing of an uprising, the unsuspecting Metalce puts its instigator, Micisda, in charge of suppressing it, and Sostrate and Viridate's forces tip the battle Ericlea and Micisda were on the verge of losing. Sostrate is crowned king, and Ericlea accepts a penitent Metalce and convinces Viridate that Rosmene acted only under duress.

== Recordings ==
- Audio: 1997 – Angelo Manzotti (Viridate), Ezio di Cesare (Sostrate), Lucia Rizzi (Rosmene); Orchestra Filarmonica Marchigiana, Marcello Panni (conductor). Live recording from the Teatro Pergolesi in Jesi, September 1997. Label: Bongionvanni.
- Video: 2010 (with La serva padrona) – Marina Comparato (Viridate), Antonio Lozano (Sostrate), Marian Rodriguez Cusi (Rosmene), Marina Di Liso (Metalce), Ruth Rosique (Ericlea), Giancinta Nicotra (Micisda); Accademia Barocca de I Virtuosi Italiani, Corrado Rovaris (conductor), Henning Brockaus (stage director). Live recording from the Teatro Pergolesi in Jesi, December 2010. Label: Arthaus Musik
