= Lo frate 'nnamorato =

Opera by Giovanni Battista Pergolesi

- Commedia musicale by G. B. Pergolesi
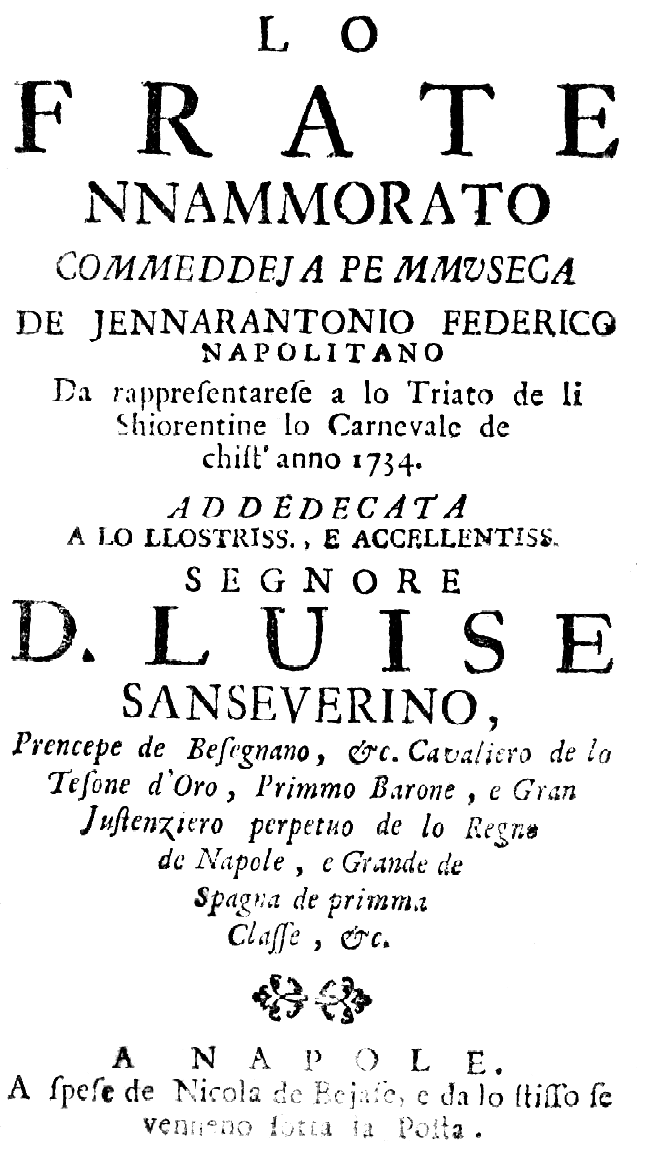
- Titlepage of the 1734 libretto
- Translation: The Brother in Love
- Librettist: Gennaro Antonio Federico
- Language: Neapolitan and Italian
- Premiere: 27 September 1732; Teatro dei Fiorentini, Naples

Lo frate 'nnamorato (Neapolitan: The Brother in Love) is a three-act commedia per musica (a form of opera buffa) by Giovanni Battista Pergolesi, to a Neapolitan libretto by Gennaro Antonio Federico, first performed in 1732.

== Composition history ==
The opera, written when the composer was only 22, is his first attempt at comic opera. (It was followed in 1733 by his better-known short opera, La serva padrona). The first performance was on 27 September 1732, at the Teatro dei Fiorentini, Naples. A successful run was halted by a severe earthquake, which closed the theatres in Naples until the autumn of 1733. It was re-presented during the 1734 carnival season, in a version revised by the author.

== Roles ==
	Role	Voice type	Premiere cast 27 September 1732
Comic	Vannella, Carlo's maidservant	soprano	Margherita Pozzi
Comic	Cardella, Marcaniello's maidservant	soprano	Maria Morante
Comic	Marcaniello, an elderly Neapolitan	bass	Giacomo D'Ambrosio
Mixture	Don Pietro, Marcaniello´s son	bass	Girolamo Piani
Mixture	Carlo, a Roman	tenor	Giovanni Battista Ciriaci
Mixture	Nina, Carlo's niece	contralto	Teresa De Palma
Mixture	Nena, Carlo's niece	soprano	Marianna Ferrante
Serious	Ascanio, Marcaniello's adopted son	soprano (en travesti)	Teresa Passaglioni
Serious	Luggrezia, Marcaniello's daughter	contralto	Rosa Gherardini

At this time in history, when comic opera was in its infancy, librettists wrote works with both comic and serious characters.

== Synopsis ==
Setting: House of Marcaniello; Capodimonte region of Naples

Ascanio, the brother of Nina and Nena, was stolen by brigands in childhood and presumed lost; he was, however, found and adopted by Marcaniello.

Now, Nina and Nena are the wards of their uncle, the Roman Don Carlo. Don Carlo wishes to marry Luggrezia, the daughter of Marcaniello, who himself wishes to marry Nina and to take Nena as a wife for his son, the foppish Don Pietro. Nina and Nena meanwhile have fallen in love with Ascanio, not realizing their relationship. The two maids Vanella (servant of Carlo) and Cardella (servant of Marcaniello) comment on and take part in the various intrigues which ensue.

Finally, in a duel with Carlo, the latter recognizes Ascanio as his lost nephew by a birthmark on his arm. Ascanio and Luggrezia are now free to marry.

== Orchestration ==
- Continuo
- Flute/Oboe (flautist would play oboe in some numbers)
- Strings

== Recordings ==
key: conductor/Nena/Nina/Luggrezia/Ascanio/Carlo/Marcaniello/Pietro/Cardella/Vannella

- Cillario/Girones/Cavicchioli/Cavicchioli/Bonisolli/Lazzari/Mariotti/Basiola/Taylor Bonisolli/Fusco - 1969, live in Naples - Memories
- Fabio Biondi/Biccirè/Adamonyte/di Castri/Belfiore/Alegret/Alaimo-N/Morace/Bove/Chierici - 2011, filmed in Jesi - Arthaus DVD
- Riccardo Muti/Felle/Manca di Nissa/D’Intino/Focile/di Cesare/Corbelli/de Simone/Curiel/Norberg-Schulz - 1989, filmed at Teatro alla Scala in Milan - Opus Arte DVD
