= Decebalo (Leo) =

Opera

Decebalo is an opera in two acts by Leonardo Leo premiered in 1743. The plot concerns Decebalus, king of the Dacians.

== Recordings ==
- Angelo Manzotti, Adrian George Popescu, Julia Surdu, Sorin Dumitrascu, Ruxandra Ibric Cioranu. Romabarocca Ensemble Lorenzo Tozzi 2CD Bongiovanni 2006
