= La serva padrona =

1733 opera by Giovanni Battista Pergolesi

- Opera buffa by G. B. Pergolesi
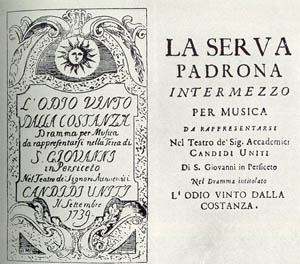
- Title page of a vintage opera program
- Description: Intermezzo
- Translation: The Maid Turned Mistress
- Librettist: Gennaro Federico
- Language: Italian
- Based on: La serva padrona by Jacopo Angello Nelli
- Premiere: 5 September 1733; Teatro San Bartolomeo, Naples

La serva padrona (The Maid Turned Mistress) is a 1733 intermezzo by Giovanni Battista Pergolesi (1710–1736) to a libretto by Gennaro Federico, after the play by Jacopo Angello Nelli. It is some 40 minutes long, in two parts without overture, and was written as light-hearted staged entertainment between the acts of Pergolesi's serious opera Il prigionier superbo. More specifically each of the two parts, set in the same dressing room, played during an intermission of the three-act opera to amuse people who remained in their seats.

Federico's libretto was also set by Giovanni Paisiello, in 1781.

== Performance history ==
La serva padrona and the opera seria it punctuates were premiered at the Teatro San Bartolomeo on 6 September 1733, the first performances there after an earthquake the previous year in Naples had closed all theatres. Both were written for the birthday of Holy Roman Empress Elisabeth Christine of Brunswick-Wolfenbüttel a few days earlier.

Il prigioniero superbo was unsuccessful in its day but has been staged in the composer's home town of Jesi several times and recorded there in 1997, 1998 and 2009, being filmed during the latter year. But La serva padrona was an immediate hit and became its own stand-alone work. Audiences found it appealing for its relatable characters: wily maid versus aging master. More significantly it became a model for the opera buffa genre and a quintessential piece bridging the Baroque and the Classical periods. With a new finale its French version provided the catalyst for the infamous Querelle des Bouffons.

== Roles ==
| Role | Voice type | Premiere cast 5 September 1733 |
|---|---|---|
| Uberto, an old man | buffo bass | Gioacchino Corrado |
| Serpina, his maid | soprano | Laura Monti |
| Vespone, his servant | silent actor | |

== Synopsis ==
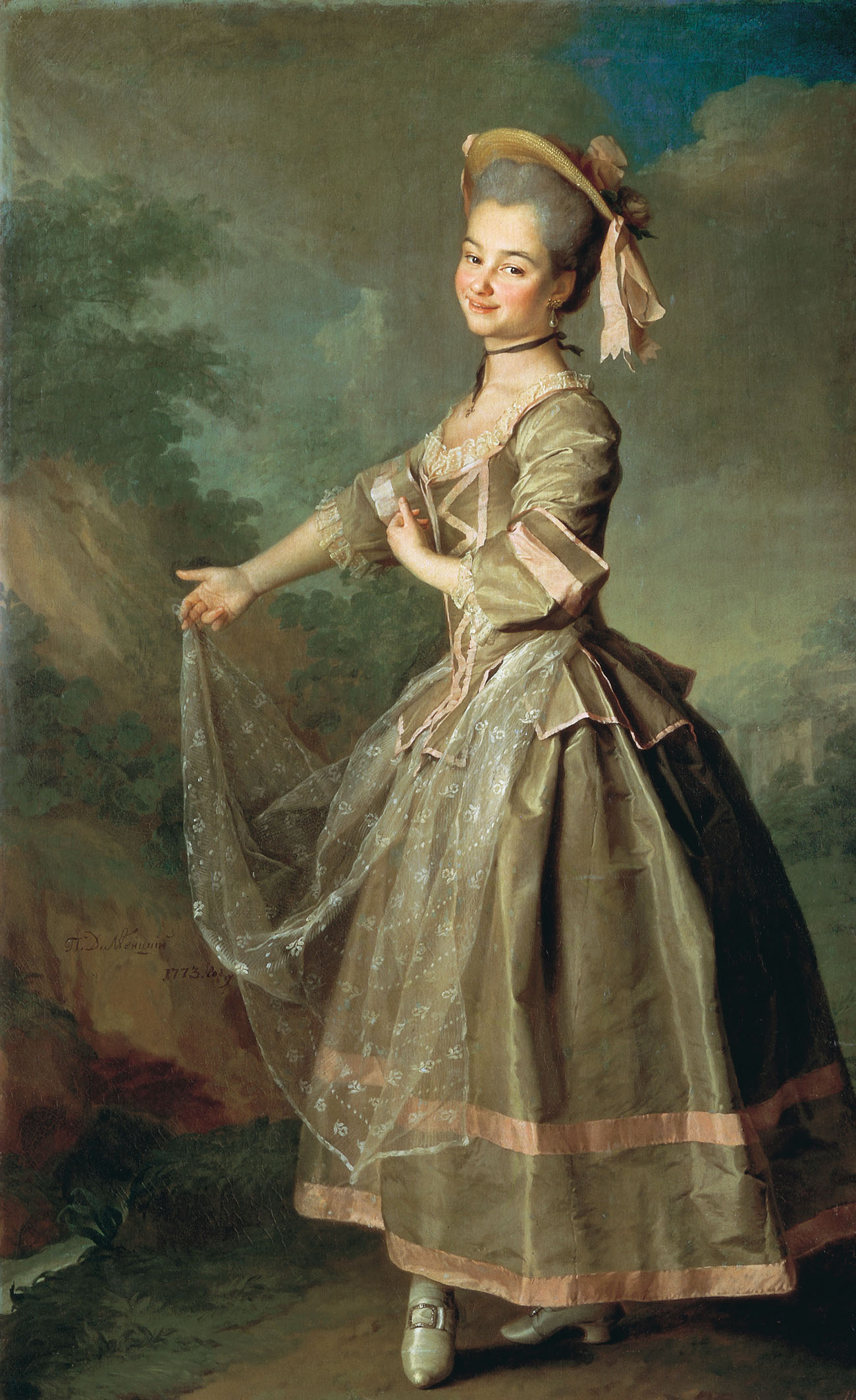
Catherine Nelidova as Serpina (by Dmitry Levitzky, 1773)

Part 1 – dressing room

Uberto, an elderly bachelor, is angry and impatient with his maidservant, Serpina, because she has not brought him his chocolate today. Serpina has become so arrogant that she thinks she is the mistress of the household. Indeed, when Uberto calls for his hat, wig and coat, Serpina forbids him to leave the house, adding that from then on he will have to obey her orders. Uberto thereupon orders Vespone to find him a woman to marry so that he can rid himself of Serpina.

Part 2 – same dressing room

Serpina convinces Vespone to trick Uberto into marrying her. She informs Uberto that she is to marry a military man named Tempesta. She will be leaving his home and apologizes for her behavior. Vespone, disguised as Tempesta, arrives and, without saying a word, demands 4,000 crowns for a dowry. Uberto refuses to pay such a sum. Tempesta threatens him to either pay the dowry or marry the girl himself. Uberto agrees to marry Serpina. Serpina and Vespone reveal their trick; but Uberto realizes that he has loved the girl all along. They will marry after all; and Serpina will now be the true mistress of the household.

== Musical numbers ==
Part 1

- Aria: Aspettare e non venire (Uberto)
- Recitativo: Quest'è per me disgrazia (Uberto, Serpina)
- Aria: Sempre in contrasti (Uberto)
- Recitativo: In somma delle somme (Serpina, Uberto)
- Aria: Stizzoso, mio stizzoso (Serpina)
- Recitativo: Benissimo. Hai tu inteso? (Uberto, Serpina)
- Duetto: Lo conosco a quegli occhietti (Serpina, Uberto)

Part 2

- Recitativo: Or che fatto ti sei (Serpina, Uberto)
- Aria: A Serpina penserete (Serpina)
- Recitativo: Ah! quanto mi sa male (Uberto, Serpina)
- Aria: Son imbrogliato io già (Uberto)
- Recitativo: Favorisca, signor, passi (Serpina, Uberto)
- Duetto finale (†): Contento tu sarai (Serpina, Uberto)

(†It later became customary to replace this final duet with another: Per te ho io nel core. This the composer wrote two years later, in 1735, for his commedia per musica, Il Flaminio.)

== Scores ==
The scores of the opera vary. Edwin F. Kalmus has one with massive omissions, wrong notes, and much spoken dialogue. Boosey & Hawkes has the score in an operetta adaptation by Seymour Barab, with highly simplified accompaniment and much spoken dialogue. Casa Ricordi presents the opera as sung through; it is the version most used. W. W. Norton & Company includes excerpts of the full score (for strings and continuo) that have numerous melodic differences from the Ricordi edition but correlate with the recording with Siegmund Nimsgern.

== Recordings and films ==
- Simonetto/Tuccari/Sesto Bruscantini, live in Capri, 1948, Cetra
- Pedrollo/Erato/Bacci, 1949, Polydor Vox
- Carlo Maria Giulini/Carteri/Nicola Rossi-Lemeni, 1955, Columbia
- Ferdinand Leitner/Mazzoleni/Cortis, 1955, Archiv
- Serra-G/Colorni/Rovetta, 1956, RCA
- FILM: Ferrara/Anna Moffo/Paolo Montarsolo, 1958 Mario Lanfranchi movie, View Video (label)
- Virginia Zeani opposite her husband Rossi-Lemeni conducted by Singer, 1959, Vox
- Renata Scotto and Bruscantini conducted by Fasano, 1960, Ricordi
- Mariella Adani and Leonardi Monreale, Pomeriggi Musicali del Teatro Nuovo di Milano, Ettore Gracis conducting, 1960, Club Français du Disque; later Nonesuch Records H-71043
- Bugeanu/Petrescu-Cironeanu/Rintzler, 1961, Electrecord
- FILM: The Ambitious Servant Girl, Australian TV movie with June Bronhill, 1962
- Maier/Bonifaccio/Siegmund Nimsgern and the Collegium Aureum, 1969, BASF; later Deutsche Harmonia Mundi
- Koch-H/Miljaković/Süß, 1970, Telefunken
- Ros Marbà/Carmen Bustamante/Renato Capecchi, 1973, Ensayo
- Alberto Zedda/Celine/Bruscantini, 1974, Vedette Quadrifoglio
- Gordana Minov-Jevtović and Nikola Mitić, 1976, PGP RTB
- Németh/Katalin Farkas/József Gregor and the Capella Savaria, 1985, Hungaroton
- FILM: Sigiswald Kuijken/Patricia Biccirè/Donato di Stefano and La Petite Bande, live in Brussels, 1986, Accent ACC 96123 D and TDK DVD (Released on DVD in 1998)
- Palmer-R/Julianne Baird/John Ostendorf, 1989, Omega
- Hirsch/Bima/Salomaa, live in Waldkirch, 1990, Arts (label)
- Mason/Bunning/Donnelly, 1992, Meridian Records
- Bezzina/Isabelle Poulenard/Cantor, 1995, Pierre Verany
- FILM: Magnani/Sylvia Klein/José Carlos Leal, 1997 Carla Camurati movie, Elimar Produções Artisticas, Brazil
- Marcello Panni/Scano/de Simone, live in Jesi, 1997, Bongiovanni
- Gustav Kuhn/Antonucci-P/di Stefano-D, live in Jesi, 1998, Arte Nova
- Clemente/Cozzoli/Govi, live in Bitonto, 1999, Kicco Classics
- Dallara/Zanello/Govi, 2006, Tactus Records
- FILM: Diego Fasolis/Sonya Yoncheva/Furio Zanasi, 2008 Swiss TV movie
- Deliso/Zyatkova/Torriani, 2011, Da Vinci
- FILM: Rovaris/Marianelli/Lepore, filmed in Jesi, 2011, Arthaus
- Scogna/Nisi/Benetti, 2013, Tactus Records
- Scogna/Liuzzi/di Gioia, 2017, Brilliant Classics
