= Rospigliosi Music Collection =

The Rospigliosi Music Collection is a collection of musical documents preserved in two institutions in Pistoia, Italy: the Archive of the Chapter and the Forteguerriana Library.

== History ==
The collection was, for the most part, collected and organized by Giovan Carlo Rospigliosi (1823–1908), a descendant of the family tree of Pope Clement IX (Giulio Rospigliosi, 1600–1669). He dabbled in voice (a baritone), and following the cultural tendencies of the high-bourgeois of the nineteenth century to furnish private libraries with music to be played in their private salons, he acquired and commissioned various musical pieces (above all songs) to animate the ordinary evenings in his palaces (that of via Ripa del Sale in Pistoia, and the villas of Candeglia in Spicchio and in Gello).

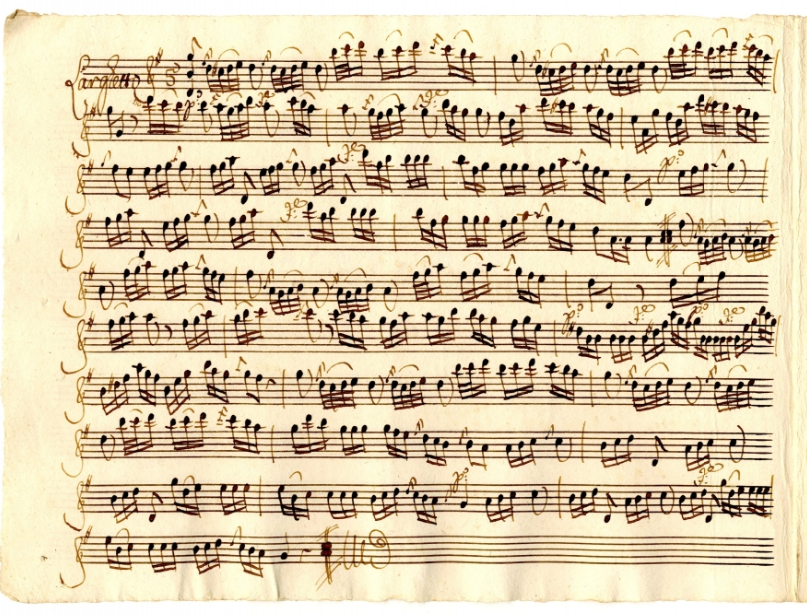
Handwritten page of a sonata for two violins by Niccolò Jommelli preserved in the Rospigliosi Music Collection in the Archive of the Chapter.

He also collected numerous librettos, single arias and complete works for voice and pianoforte, drawn from the performances of the Teatro dei Risvegliati, to which he was a member. His musical possessions were greatly amplified when he integrated his immense patrimony of his family, who became one of the most extravagant patrons of Pistoia from 1635 and on. The remarkable collection, kept organized (three accurate inventories composed by Giovan Carlo exist), remained the property of the descendants of the Rospigliosi family until the 1970s when the priest from Pistoia, Umberto Pineschi, convinced Clemente Rospigliosi to donate the most antique pages to the Archive of the Chapter. The same Clemente, in 1982, decided to donate the rest of the collection to the Town of Pistoia, where it is preserved still today in the Forteguerriana Library.

== Description ==
In all, the collection consists of 4668 units: 4116 are at the Forteguerriana, 552 are at the Archive of the Chapter. The oldest objects, manuscripts, come about because of the patronage of the Rospilgliosi Family, with a great deal of music by the composers that were active in Pistoia, Pisa and Florence in the 1700s (for example Giovan Gualberto Brunetti, Charles-Antoine Campion, Giuseppe Gherardeschi, Christian Joseph Lidarti) as well as at the national level (such as Giovanni Battista Sammartini, Niccolò Jommelli and Giuseppe Farinelli). Most of these are conserved today in the Archive of the Chapter because of their sacred nature. The Forteguerriana Library, however, hosts the manuscript of Ercole in Tebe by Jacopo Melani in 1661 of theatrical origin. The core of the collection is based on the acquisitions in the 1800s by Giovan Carlo, and is made up of: some arias composed for him by the local songwriter Raffaello Bertini (of which the Forteguerriana Library conserves the handwritten copies), numerous opera librettos (of almost all of the authors found in Pistoia from 1868 to 1902, from Rossini to Mabellini, from Mercadante to Massenet, from Pacini to Gounod, from Meyerbeer to Bellini, from Donizetti to Bizet, from Auber to Verdi, to whom he shares a strong spirit for the Risorgimento), printed editions of arias for voice (suitable for his own range of baritone, but also for other voice types) inspired by miscellaneous and contemporary collections and often with piano accompaniment (librettos and songs are at the Forteguerriana), publications regarding musical topics (today at the Archive of the Chapter), such as publications by the theorists of the 1800s and 1900s (Abramo Basevi, Riccardo Gandolfi) as well as letters and other writings by composers (for example letters by Bellini in an edition dated 1882, and the artistic memories of Pacini printed from 1865 to 1872).
