= The Duchess of Malfi (disambiguation) =

The Duchess of Malfi is a macabre, tragic play, written by the English dramatist John Webster and first performed in 1614.

The Duchess of Malfi may also refer to:

- The Duchess of Malfi (Brecht), 1946, an adaptation by German dramatist Bertolt Brecht
- The Duchess of Malfi (opera), 1971, an opera in three acts by British composer Stephen Oliver

== See also ==
- Duke of Amalfi
