= La Salustia =

1732 opera by Giovanni Battista Pergolesi

- Opera seria by G. B. Pergolesi
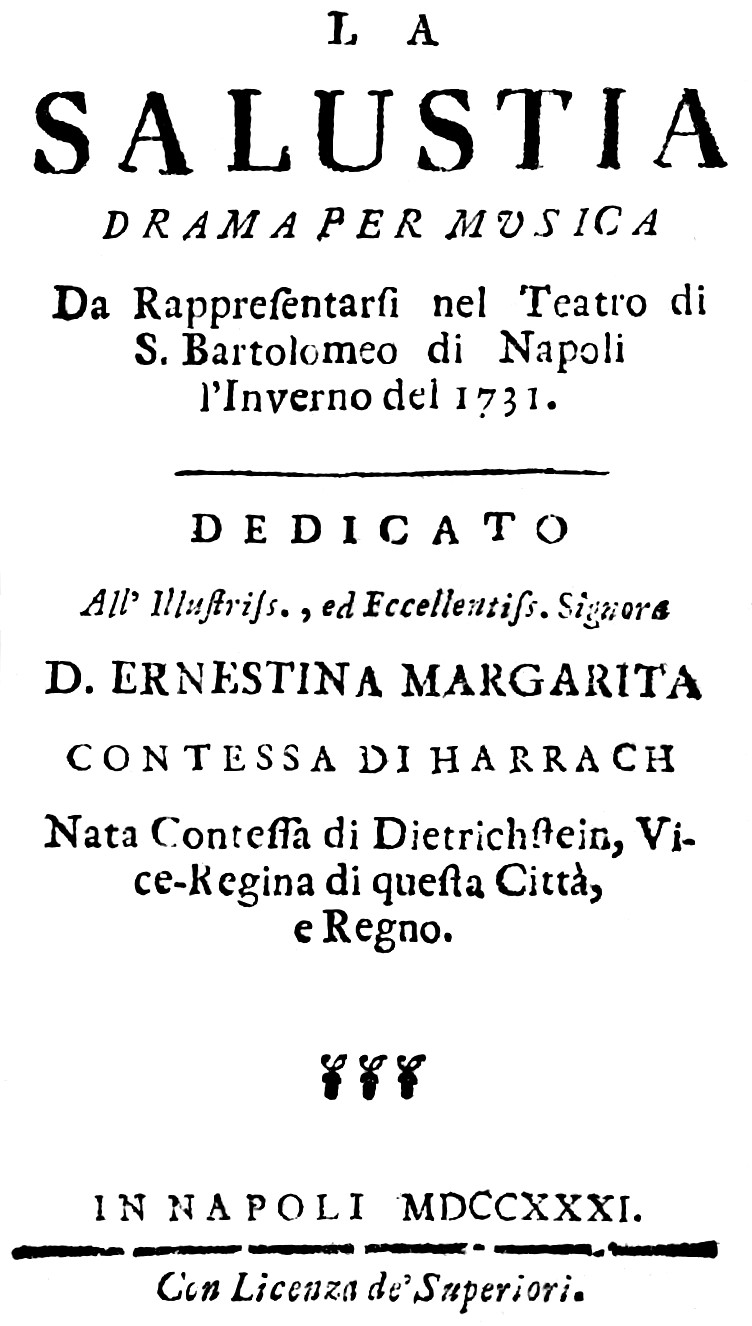
- Title page of the libretto
- Language: Italian
- Based on: Alessandro Severo by Apostolo Zeno
- Premiere: 1732; Teatro San Bartolomeo, Naples

La Salustia is a 1732 opera (dramma per musica) in three acts by Giovanni Battista Pergolesi to a revised text, possibly by Sebastiano Morelli, after Apostolo Zeno's famous 1716 libretto Alessandro Severo, which was also later adapted by Handel. The production was marred when the leading man Nicolo Grimaldi "Nicolini" fell fatally ill before the performance and an inexperienced substitute Gioacchino Conti "Gizziello" had to be called in at the last minute. La Salustia was Pergolesi's first opera seria. The story is based on the life of the Roman emperor Alexander Severus and his wife Sallustia Orbiana.

== Background ==
In 1731 Pergolesi's long years of study at the Conservatorio dei Poveri di Gesù Cristo in Naples were reaching their end. He had already begun to make a name for himself and was able to pay off his expenses by working as a performer in religious institutions and noble salons, first as a singer then as a violinist. In 1729–30 he had been "capoparanza" (first violin) in a group of instrumentalists and, according to a later witness, it was the Oratorian Fathers who made most regular use of his artistic services as well as those of other "mastricelli" (little maestros) from the Conservatorio. The first important commission Pergolesi received on leaving the school was linked to this religious order and on 19 March 1731 his oratorio La fenice sul rogo, o vero La morte di San Giuseppe ["The Phoenix on the Pyre, or The Death of Saint Joseph"] was performed in the atrium of the church today known as the Chiesa dei Girolamini, the home of the Congregazione di San Giuseppe. This two-part oratorio, with a text by Antonino Maria Paolucci, was the first important work by the composer from Jesi. "The following summer Pergolesi was asked to set to music, as the final exercise of his studies, a dramma sacro in three acts by Ignazio Mancini, Li prodigi della divina grazia nella conversione e morte di san Guglielmo duca d’Aquitania ["The Miracles of Divine Grace in the Conversion and Death of Saint William, Duke of Aquitaine"]. The performance took place in the cloisters of the monastery of Sant'Agnello Maggiore, the home of the Canons Regular of the Most Holy Savior."

Whether as a result of the renown Pergolesi had earned from such precocious activity, or the support of the noble families at the court of the Habsburg Viceroyalty of Naples with whom he had been in contact and who would later employ him as maestro di cappella, in late 1731 Pergolesi obtained a commission to write an opera seria, with comic intermezzi, from the leading Neapolitan theatre of the time, Teatro San Bartolomeo. Virtually nothing is known of the circumstances of the composition. It was decided to use a reworking of a libretto by Apostolo Zeno, Alessandro Severo, written about 15 years earlier, now renamed after another leading character as La Salustia. The author of the revision is unknown, even if some sources are inclined to give the credit to a certain Sebastiano Morelli, an otherwise obscure figure, who wrote the dedication to the wife of the Viceroy of Naples contained in the printed libretto. However, it makes no mention of the obvious connection with Zeno's text.

The company employed by the Teatro San Bartolomeo enjoyed a high reputation. Following the conventions of the operatic theatre of the time the company was usually supposed to consist of a couple of female singers to take the roles of prima and seconda donna (first and second ladies); a couple of musici ("musicians", a euphemistic term for "castrati"), who might be replaced by women en travesti, for the roles of first and second amorosi ("lovers"); a baritenor (or, if there was no alternative, a bass) for the roles of father, general or rival – if the characters were good – or, more often, the villain; and probably other singers used in the tertiary roles, of little importance and often even lacking independent arias. These roles could also be filled by singers employed in the comic intermezzi, if there were any, generally a bass and a soprano (or, in an earlier period, a contralto).

The leading singer in the company of San Bartolomeo was the contralto Nicolò Grimaldi, known as "Cavalier Nicolino", a true star of the international operatic stage. Then nearing his sixties, he had been at the top of his profession for three decades. Next to him, in the role of secondo amoroso was Angiola Zanuchi (or Zanucchi), a mezzosoprano of probably limited scope who specialised in travesti roles. While the tenor role was taken by the expert singer Francesco Tolve, the company's true speciality was its female cast. The rank of prima donna indisputably belonged to the young soprano Lucia Facchinelli, known as "La Becheretta", who was well paired with "Nicolino" and had arrived in Naples with him. Besides her, not one but two female singers were available: Teresa Cotti (or Cotte), from Milan, a longstanding seconda donna, who had played the role of Salustia in a previous setting of Alessandro Severo; and the young Anna Mazzoni, who had been active in Naples for a couple of years and would go on to have a career as a prima donna across Italy and Europe in the 1740s. The libretto, perhaps chosen by design, perfectly suited this type of cast. Apart from the five customary main characters, a sixth was provided, that of Giulia Mammea, the far from exemplary mother of Emperor Alessandro. Roles for mothers (and wives) were virtually absent from the canonical Metastasian drama and only by reverting to a slightly old-fashioned libretto like Zeno's was it possible to supply such a prominent wicked-mother role as Giulia Mammea, for which the experienced Cotti appeared to be highly suited. But the problems of casting did not end there. The almost sixty-year-old Nicolino, perhaps because he was no longer able to cope with the vocal acrobatics demanded by the part of primo amoroso, perhaps simply because he was now tired of playing the role of the "young hero" in which he risked looking ridiculous, had already shown himself willing to compromise regarding his position. At the premiere of Artaserse by Johann Adolf Hasse in 1730, for example, he had handed over the rank of primo amoroso to the rising star Farinelli and had instead accepted the part of the villainous father Artabano, a typical tenor role. Another role of the kind was Massimiano, protagonist of the opera of the same name by Giuseppe Maria Orlandini, to a text by Zeno, in which he had starred in Venice in early 1731. All the evidence suggests that at Naples too, Nicolino, the theatre management and the young Pergolesi agreed to follow the same route, which entailed upsetting the usual hierarchy of the male section of the company: the primo musico took the role of the father (Marziano, a sort of evil male counterpart to Giulia Mammea), Zanuchi was promoted to the position of primo amoroso, in the role of the weak emperor Alessandro, and the tenor Tolve had to make do with the remaining role of Claudio.

The commission also involved writing an intermezzo, to be performed, according to the custom, between the first and second and the second and third acts. The music has not survived. The text was probably supplied by a certain Domenico Caracajus, who was also employed, according to Hucke and Monson, to provide the music for the recitatives in the second part of the intermezzo, which suggests that the time available for composing La Salustia was fairly limited. The intermezzo has no title in the libretto, but musicologists often refer to it by the names of the two protagonists, Nibbio and Nerina. They were played by the tried and tested comic couple of the buffo bass Gioacchino Corrado, a real institution of this musical genre, and the soprano Celeste Resse.

== Performance history ==
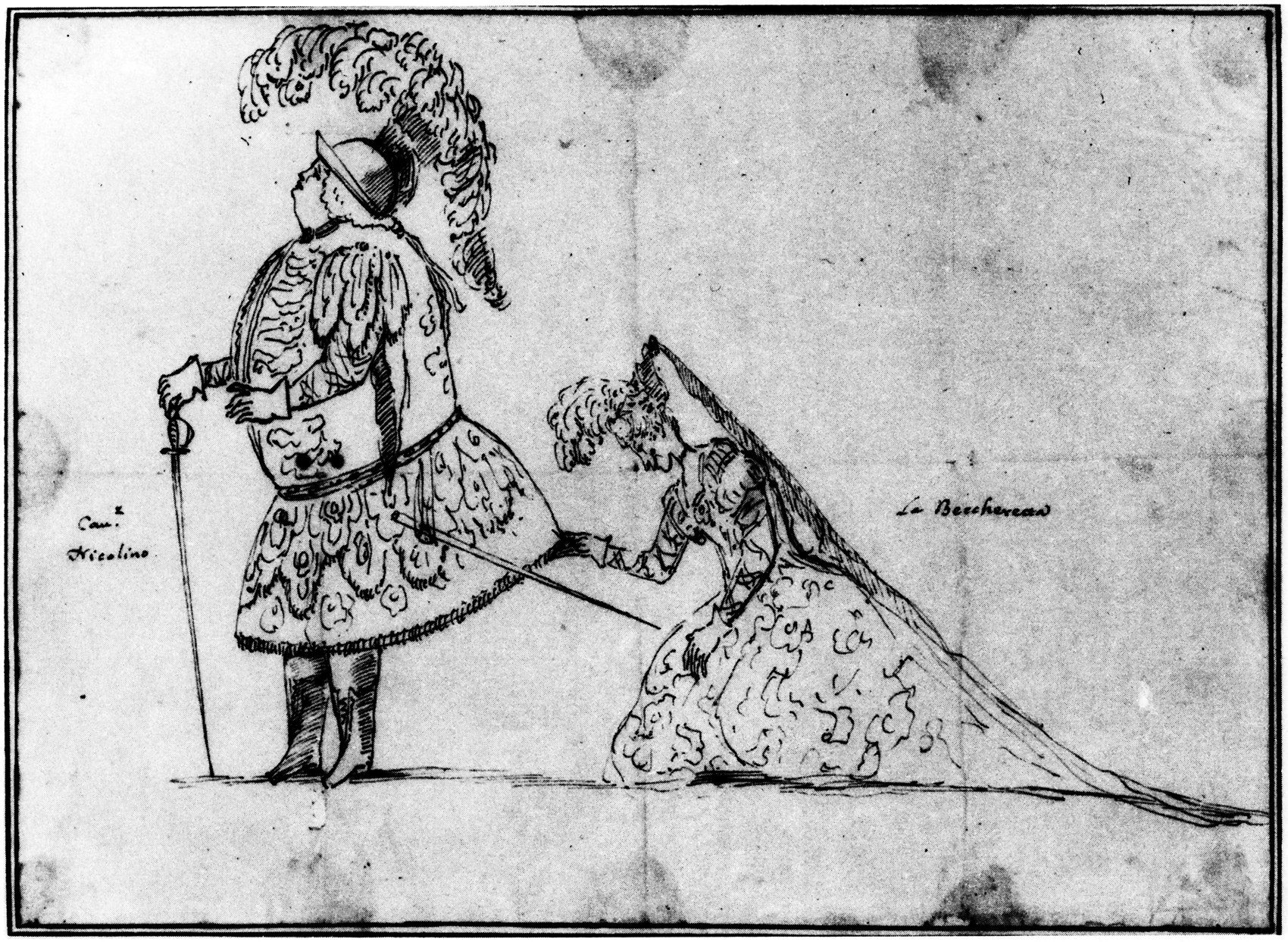
Caricature by Anton Maria Zanetti depicting the singer Nicola Grimaldi ("Nicolino") with Lucia Facchinelli ("La Becheretta"), who played Salustia

Everything was therefore ready for the premiere of La Salustia, scheduled according to the libretto for "the winter of 1731", when an unexpected crisis threw all the planning into confusion. We do not know the precise details of the events, but while the rehearsals were probably underway, or at least scheduled, on 1 January 1732 (the timing suggests a brief illness) "Cavalier Nicolino" suddenly died, forcing the theatre management and Pergolesi to take emergency measures. They hired a musico from Rome by the name of Gioacchino Conti (later famous as "Giziello") to take over the dead man's post. Giziello was a promising singer but he was not yet 18; he had received his musical education in Naples and was still fresh from his debut on the Roman stage. His arrival upset the casting: the eccentricity of entrusting the role of a wicked father to a castrato, even though it might have been feasible with a tried and tested singer in his sixties, became unacceptable in the hands of a novice who was under 18, so it was decided to make some face-saving alterations. The part of Marziano was handed to the tenor Tolve while Giziello took over the less demanding role of Claudio, thus reverting to the standard company casting but forcing Pergolesi to revise his score at the last minute. "Some arias were substituted, others were transposed downwards (from contralto to tenor) or upwards (from tenor to soprano)" and by the end the most satisfied performer was probably Tolve, whose character remained musically central, even keeping the virtuoso aria in the finale originally intended for Nicolino.

The opera was staged with the revisions and the new cast, probably in the second half of January 1732 and only enjoyed a short run before it was replaced by Francesco Mancini's Alessandro nell'Indie, scheduled for 2 February. After that it was almost completely forgotten, although the opera's documents were preserved in the archives in the expectation of a revival: they have allowed a precise reconstruction of both the original, unstaged version with the role of Marziano for the contralto range, and the second version with this role transposed for a tenor and that of Claudio transposed for soprano.

Not until the 21st century did La Salustia finally reappear on stage. In 2008 it was performed, first at the Opéra Comédie in Montpellier in July and then at the Teatro Pergolesi in Jesi in September, in a co-production between the Festival de Radio France et Montpellier, the Fondazione Pergolesi Spontini and the Opéra National de Montpellier Languedoc Roussillon. The original version was used, making it practically a premiere. In 2011 the Fondazione Pergolesi Spontini decided that the second version, the one staged in 1731, should be offered to the public. This production was filmed by Unitel Classics and appeared on DVD/Blu-Ray in association with Arthaus Musik. There also exists a French television recording of the 2008 production, although this is not available on DVD.

== Roles ==
Role	Voice type	Premiere cast
Marziano, general of Alessandro's army	initially intended for: contralto castrato actual performer: tenor	Nicolò Grimaldi ("Nicolino") Francesco Tolve
Salustia, his daughter, empress wife of Alessandro	soprano	Lucia Facchinelli
Giulia Mammea, empress mother	soprano	Teresa Cotti
Alessandro, emperor, her son	contralto (en travesti)	Angiola Zanuchi (or Zanucchi)
Albina, Roman noblewoman, dressed as a man, in love with Claudio	soprano	Anna Mazzoni
Claudio, Roman knight, friend of Marziano	initially intended for: tenor actual performer: soprano castrato	Francesco Tolve; Gioacchino Conti

== Instrumentation ==
This is a list of the instrumentation used in the score of La Salustia:

- 2 oboes
- 2 horns
- 2 trumpets
- strings
- basso continuo

== Synopsis ==
Background: The 13-year-old Alessandro Severo (Alexander Severus) had become Roman emperor after the murder of his uncle Elagabalus. He remained under the guardianship of his mother Giulia Mammea (Julia Mamaea), who arranged his marriage to the young noblewoman Salustia. Alessandro soon fell in love with Salustia, named her empress and awarded her several honours which had previously been reserved for his mother. Giulia thus became jealous of her daughter-in-law and used all the resources at her disposal to get rid of her hated rival.

The opera begins with a celebration of the anniversary of Alessandro's coronation. Alessandro appoints Salustia's father Marziano (Seius Sallustius) as the head of the army. Giulia suffers from her growing jealousy. In a sub-plot, young Albina arrives in Rome in search of her former beloved Claudio. As he has lost interest in her, she begs Salustia for help. Giulia tricks her son into signing a document by which he unwittingly repudiates his wife. When Salustia's father hears of this he decides to kill Giulia with the help of Claudio – first by poison, then if that fails, by the sword. Albina overhears their conversation. She betrays the conspiracy to Salustia to get revenge on Claudio. At the subsequent banquet Salustia prevents the poisoning. Since she is unwilling to name the culprit – her father – suspicion falls on her. Neither Giulia's threats nor Alessandro's pleading can make her speak. Claudio learns from Albina that she is the one who betrayed the plot. He is impressed by her decisiveness. When Giulia falls asleep in her bedchamber, Marziano undertakes a second murder attempt – but Salustia saves the empress's life. Marziano is arrested and sentenced to be torn apart by wild animals in the arena. At Salustia's request, Giulia decides he will only have to fight a single wild beast and will be set free if he wins. He triumphs and Giulia's anger vanishes. She accepts Salustia as her daughter-in-law and forgives Marziano. Claudio and Albina are also able to marry.

== Recordings ==
Year	Cast (in the order: Marziano, Salustia, Giulia, Alessandro, Albina, Claudio	Conductor, Orchestra, Stage director	Edizione
2012	Vittorio Prato, Serena Malfi, Laura Polverelli, Florin Cezar Ouatu, Giacinta Nicotra, Maria Hinojosa Montenegro	Corrado Rovaris, Accademia Barocca de I Virtuosi Italiani, Juliette Dechamps	Arthaus: Catalog.: 108 065 (Blu Ray); Catalog.: 101 651 (DVD)

== Sources ==
- Original libretto. La Salustia, Drama per Musica Da Rappresentarsi nel Teatro di S. Bartolomeo di Napoli l'Inverno del 1731 Dedicato All’illustriss., ed Eccellentiss. Signora Donna Ernestina Margarita Contessa di Harrach, Nata Contessa di Dietrichstein, Viceregina di questa Città e Regno, Naples, publisher not indicated, 1731, available online at the following locations:
  - digital version as a free Google e-book
  - critical transcription at Varianti all'Opera – Università Milano, Padova e Siena
- Gerardo Guccini, La direzione scenica dell'opera italiana, in Lorenzo Bianconi and Giorgio Pestelli (editors), Storia dell'opera italiana, Volume 5: La spettacolarità, Turin, EDT, 1988, pp. 123–156, ISBN 88-7063-053-6
- Salvatore Caruselli (editor), Grande enciclopedia della musica lirica, Longanesi & C. Periodici S.p.A., Rome
- Gabriele Catalucci and Fabio Maestri, introductory notes to the audio recording of San Guglielmo Duca d'Aquitania, issued by Bongiovanni, Bologna, 1989, GB 2060/61-2
- Rodolfo Celletti, Storia dell'opera italiana, Milan, Garzanti, 2000, ISBN 9788847900240.
- Francesco Cotticelli, Pergolesi's La Salustia: a problematic debut, essay in the booklet accompanying the Arthaus Musik – Unitel Classics Blu-Ray of La Salustia, conducted by Corrado Rovaris
- Bianca De Mario (2014). "Salustia and us, or The Tragic Happy Ending: Opera Seria Between Dramaturgy and Stage Direction". In Mattia Cavagna; Costantino Maeder (eds.). Philology and Performing Arts: A Challenge. Louvain-la-Neuve: Presses Universitaires de Louvain. pp. 113–136. ISBN 978-2-87558-321-5.
- Fabrizio Dorsi and Giuseppe Rausa, Storia dell'opera italiana, Turin, Paravia Bruno Mondadori, 2000, ISBN 978-88-424-9408-9
- Helmut Hucke and Dale E. Monson, Pergolesi, Giovanni Battista, in Stanley Sadie, op.cit., III, pp. 951–956
- Marita P. McClymonds (with Daniel Heartz), Opera Seria, in Stanley Sadie, op.cit., III, pp. 698–707
- Paolo Patrizi, Prima della Prima, «www.drammaturgia.it» (Firenze University Press), 15 September 2008
- Daniela Puggioni, Teatro Pergolesi di Jesi. La Salustia la prima di Pergolesi, «gothicNetwork», Year III 12 September 2011
- Maria Grazia Sità, Salustia, in Piero Gelli and Filippo Poletti (editors), Dizionario dell'opera 2008, Milan, Baldini Castoldi Dalai, 2007, pp. 1176–1177, ISBN 978-88-6073-184-5 (reproduced in Opera Manager)
- Stanley Sadie (editor), The New Grove Dictionary of Opera, New York, Grove (Oxford University Press), 1997, ISBN 978-0-19-522186-2
- Claudio Toscani, Pergolesi, Giovanni Battista, in Dizionario Biografico degli Italiani, Volume 82, 2015 (accessible online at Treccani.it)
- Andrea Zepponi, "La Salustia" e l’archeologia d’opera , «GB Opera Magazine», September 2011
- This article contains material translated from the equivalent article in the Italian Wikipedia
