= Amor vuol sofferenza =

Amor vuol sofferenza is a 1739 commedia per musica in three acts by Leonardo Leo to a libretto by Antonio Federico Gennaro (d.1744). It was first performed at Naples, Teatro Nuovo. Leo was working on a revision to be entitled La finta Frascatana in 1744 when he died, which was completed by Matteo Capranica.

== Cast ==
La fedeltà odiata Teatro dei Fiorentini 1744

- Fazio - fool, lucchese, bass, premiered by Gioacchino Corrado
- Alessandro - young Romano, lover of Eugenia, the enamoured with Camilla, contralto travesti, premiered by Antonia Colasanti
- Camilla - innamorata di Ridolfo, soprano, premiered by Maddalena Frizzi
- Vastarella - della villa di Portici, enamoured first with Mosca, then with Fazio, soprano, premiered by Margherita Pozzi
- Eugenia - feigned fraschetana, servant in the house of Alessandro's uncle known as Ninetta, lover of Alessandro contralto
- Ridolfo - young Genovese in love with Eugenia taken for Ninetta, soprano castrato, premiered by Giacomo Ricci
- Mosca - old man, napoletano in love with Vastarella, bass, premiered by Girolamo Piani

== Recordings ==
- Amor vuol sofferenza Marilyne Fallot, Giovanna Donadini, Marilena Laurenza. Nuova Orchestra Scarlatti di Napoli, Daniele Moles, Nuova Era 3CD
