= Giovan Gualberto Brunetti =

Italian composer

Giovan Gualberto Brunetti (Pistoia, 24 April 1706 – Pisa, 20 May 1787) was an Italian composer.

== Biographical Information ==
Giovan Gualberto Brunetti studied violin with Atto Gherardeschi in Pistoia, and beginning in 1723 was the student of Giovan Carlo Maria Clari in Pisa. In 1728, Brunetti left in order to study violin at the Pietà dei Turchini Conservatory in Naples, where he was instead forced to study voice performance as a tenor. In 1733, he composed a comic opera, but his operatic career did not take off. Brunetti earned a living as a singer in Neapolitan churches until he was hired as the Chapel Master for the Duke of Monte Nero, who brought him to Sicily for 6 months, where he composed a serenata for the arrival of Charles of Bourbon in Messina (1735), as well as at least two comic operas on Pietro Trinchera's librettos. For six more months, he taught at the Filipino Oratorio of Genoa, after which he was hired at the Turchini Conservatory as assistant director from 1745 until 1754. At this time, he accepted to succeed Clari, as Chapel Master of the Duomo of Pisa. He stayed in Pisa for almost thirty years and became a priest after the death of his wife, Giuseppina, in 1763. He recovered the musical archive after the Arno flooded and also worked for the Cavalieri of Santo Stefano; he resume his career in theater, using librettos by Gennaro Antonio Federico and Pietro Metastasio, achieving success in Lucca as well. In 1756, he became a member of the Philharmonic Academy in Bologna. He died in 1787.

== Works and musical sources ==
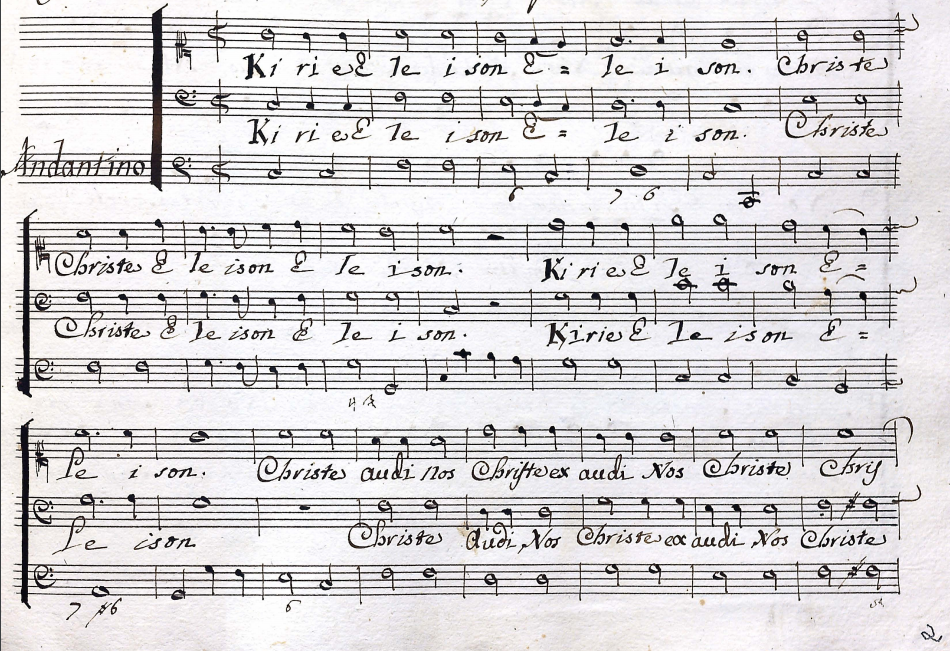
First page of a 1795 manuscript, stored in Fondo Ricasoli at the University of Kentucky in Louisville. The music is Litanie per soprano e basso composed by Brunetti.

The Brunetti family often used the same first names for their children, and many of the family members were composers. This complicates the exact identification of the music. At least three of the five children of Giovan Gualberto were musicians (among them became famous Antonio and Giuseppe, himself father of another Antonio) and often Brunetti’s works were attributed to them in the past. Of his musical production, a great amount of sacred music is preserved, much of which is conserved as manuscript copies from the late 1700s. The Duomo Archive (Piccolomini Library and Metropolitan Opera) of Siena (which also preserves his assumed autograph) and the Palatina Library (Biblioteca Palatina) of Parma possess the greatest number of the aforementioned manuscripts. Other cities that conserve copies of Brunetti’s works are Pistoia (in Rospigliosi Music Collection at Archive of the Chapter), Lucca (Diocesan Library “Giuliano Agresti”), Pescia (Archive of the Chapter), Genoa (Paganini Conservatory) and Palermo (Bellini Conservatory). His autographs are found at the Santini-Bibliothek of Münster, and at the Philharmonic Academies of Bologna and Torino, but the most notable number of compositions were rediscovered by the Centro Documentazione Musicale della Toscana (Italian web site) in Pisa: the Historical Musical Archive of the Opera della Primaziale possesses more than 530 compositions by Brunetti, most of which are autographs, while the Musical Archive of the Ordine dei Cavalieri di Santo Stefano conserves 15 works, 8 of which are autographed. Of his, at the least, seven theatrical operas documented, we have the librettos of five (conserved for the most part at the Cini Foundation of Venice, but also at the National Libraries in Florence, Rome and Cosenza, as well as in the Conservatory in Naples), and only musical fragments (single arias) of two, present in Uppsala (at Universitetsbibliotek «Carolina Rediviva») and at Berkeley (Jean Gray Hargrove Music Library).

== Discography ==
A Stabat Mater by Brunetti has been recorded. Ensemble Turicum recorded it in 1994, inside Altstettener Kirchen in Zurich, published by Pan Classics label. In 2009, «Combattimento Consort» of Amsterdam recorded it with conductor Jan Willem de Vriend in Sint Petruskerk, Oirschot, published by Stichting Stabat Mater.

== Sources and further reading ==
- Luigi Nerici, Storia della musica in Lucca, Lucca, Giusti, 1880, pp. 317, 344.
- Robert Eitner, Biographisch-Bibliographisches Quellen-Lexikon, vol. 2, Leipzig, Breitkopf & Härtel, 1900, p. 214. New edition 1904: vol. 10, p. 407. New one-volume edition: Graz, Akadem Druck, 1959.
- Alfredo Segrè, Il teatro pubblico di Pisa nel Seicento e nel Settecento, Pisa, Mariotti, 1902, pp. 39–41.
- Alfredo Segrè, La vita in Pisa nel '700, Grosseto, presso l'autore, 1922, pp. 28–31.
- Pietro Pecchiai, Alcune notizie su l'archivio musicale del Duomo di Pisa e due musicisti pisani del '700 (Clari e Brunetti), Pisa, Cesari, 1930, pp. 4–7.
- Leila Galleni Luisi, Brunetti, in Dizionario biografico degli italiani, vol. 14, Roma, Istituto dell'Enciclopedia Italiana, 1972, for consultation on-line at Treccani.it
- Brunetti. Famiglia di musicisti italiani, in Dizionario enciclopedico universale della musica e dei musicisti, edited da Alberto Basso, serie II: Le biografie, vol. 1: A-BUR, Torino, UTET, 1985, pp. 734–735.
- Paolo Peretti, Due «Stabat Mater» di Giovanni Gualberto (1764) e Antonio (1825) Brunetti «ad imitazione dell'esimio sig. Pergolesi», in «Rivista Italiana di Musicologia», II/29 (1994), Lucca, LIM, 1994, pp 401–457.
- Stefano Barandoni, Paola Raffaelli, L'archivio musicale della chiesa conventuale dei Cavalieri di Santo Stefano di Pisa. Storia e catalogo, Lucca, LIM, 1994, documents 38-52.
- Brunetti. Familie, in Die Musik in Geschichte und Gegenwart. Allegemeine Enzyklopädie der Musik begründet von Friedrich Blume, edited by Ludwig Finscher, serie I: Personenteil, vol. 3: Bj-Cal, Kassel-Basel-London-New York-Praha, Bärenreiter/Stuttgart-Weimar, Metzler, 2000, column 1142-1144.
- Franco Baggiani, Brunetti. Italian family of musicians, in The New Grove of Music and Musicians. Second Edition, edited by Stanley Sadie, executive editor John Tyrrell, vol. 4: Borowski to Canobbio, London, Macmillan, 2001-2002, pp. 507–509.
