= L'ambizione delusa (Leo) =

1742 comic opera by Leonardo Leo

L'ambizione delusa is a 1742 comic opera by Leonardo Leo. The plot concerns Lupino and his sister Cintia, formerly rural poor, who suddenly become rich and are taught by the maid Delfina to behave "aristocratically".

In 2013, L'ambizione delusa was recorded live at the 39th Valle d'Itria Festival in Martina Franca. Italy
