= L'Alidoro =

L'Alidoro is a 1740 comic opera by Leonardo Leo. The opera was rediscovered with three other Leo operas at the Abbey of Montecassino.

== Characters ==
Giangrazio is the father of Don Marciello and Alidoro, but the latter has disappeared.

Giangrazio's brother, Lamberto is now dead and has left behind a daughter, Elisa, and a step-daughter, Faustina. Faustina is already in love with Luigi, and Elisa falls in love with Ascanio. Giangrazio plans to marry Don Marciello to Faustina.

Luigi and Ascanio are in fact only one: Luigi has accepted a position as a servant in Giangrazio's house under the name of Ascanio in order to be close to Faustina, whom he loves. Towards the end, it turns out that Luigi/Ascanio is in fact Alidoro. The role of Luigi is played by a soprano.

Don Marciello must obey his father and marry Faustina, but is in love with Zeza. Giangrazio also falls in love with Zeza.

Zeza, the innkeeper, and Meo, the miller, love each other.

The plot is set near Naples in the area of the present Poggioreale district. The time is the 15th century.

== Synopsis ==
=== Act One ===
Elisa interrupts a rendezvous between Faustina and Luigi/Ascanio and sits down with them. Meo and Zeza also appear. Meo plays a love song on a colascione that Luigi admires. Meo and Zeza then sing a duet. When Don Marciello appears and sings along, they leave in disgust. Elisa and Faustina also find his behavior impertinent. Don Marciello reflects on his unrequited love for Zeza and his unwanted marriage to Faustina.

Giangrazio complains about the wasted education of Don Marciello, who prefers to spend his life in pleasure and refuses to marry Faustina. He then tries to sound out Meo about his son's relationship with Zeza. This arouses Meo's jealousy, and shortly afterwards he makes Zeza feel his suspicion. Zeza is displeased about this. She finds Don Marcellio's advances annoying, and she feels neglected by Meo.

Elisa declares her love to Ascanio. He tells Faustina about it and assures her of his loyalty. However, she fears that he might leave her for Elisa.

Giangrazio asks Zeza about her relationship with Don Marciello. She tells him how she disapproves of his intrusions. When Don Marciello arrives, Giangrazio reproaches him for this. Don Marciello suspects that his father has fallen in love with her himself. Meo also appears and sees Zeza with Don Marciello. The first act ends in wild insults from everyone involved.

=== Act Two ===
In front of the inn, Don Marciello approaches Zeza again and asks for wine. She serves him only reluctantly and does not want to accept his generous tip. The jealous Meo comes along and cynically urges her to accept the money. Ascanio also appears. Meo explains that he wants nothing more to do with Zeza and that Don Marciello has a free hand. In contrast to him, Don Marciello is wealthy and also has a prettier face. Don Marciello and Meo leave. Luigi is astonished that Zeza seems to have given up Meo so quickly in favour of Don Marciello. His joy at the fact that Faustina is now free for him is, however, interrupted by Elisa, who is still hoping that he will return her love. When he rejects her, Elisa swears revenge. But Luigi is confident that she will soon calm down again.

Elisa complains to Faustina about Ascanio's behaviour. Faustina fears that Ascanio may have secretly fallen in love with her.

Meo complains to Giangrazio about Zeza and Don Marciello, thus strengthening his interest in Zeza. When she arrives, he curses her. Zeza bursts into tears. She assures Giangrazio that she never harmed his son. She kisses his hand to confirm. Giangrazio's confusion grows.

When Meo cynically asks Zeza if she has any admirers besides the father and son, she recognizes Giangrazio's infatuation. Meo leaves the house angry. Zeza despairs of men and love.

Elisa implements her plan of revenge against Ascanio. She tells Giangrazio that he tried to seduce her. Giangrazio decides to dismiss him.

In the presence of Faustina, Giangrazio throws Ascanio out. Faustina suspects Elisa is behind it.

Don Marciello demands a declaration of love from Zeza, but she rejects him again. Meo arrives. While Zeza disappears for a moment in the inn, he sings a Sicilian song. Then Don Marciello and Meo start a loud game (a morra) to annoy her. Giangrazio joins in and first argues with Meo, then with Don Marciello. Neither Giangrazio nor Don Marciello want to admit to each other that they are in love with Zeza and ask her to confirm her innocence.

=== Act Three ===
Elisa confesses to Faustina the reason for her anger: her unrequited love for Ascanio. She would get Giangrazio to hire him back only if he returned her love.

Faustina tells Luigi about Elisa's confession. Luigi suggests that she should tell Elisa of his undying love for her. If Elisa wants to be deceived, she should be. Faustina asks forgiveness for her jealousy.

Giangrazio offers Ascanio to rehire him if he ensures that Don Marciello and Faustina marry that very evening.

Giangrazio tries to convince Ascanio that he (Giangrazio) pretended to be in love with Zeza only in order to get Don Marciello to give her up. Ascanio should therefore convince Zeza of his (Giangrazio's) love. Ascanio does not believe a word of it. Nevertheless, he decides to continue to serve Giangrazio to make sure that everything turns out well.

Meo watches from a hiding place as Don Marciello courts Zeza again. She explains to him that she wants nothing to do with him or his father and drives him away with blows. This convinces Meo that Don Marciello is not a serious rival. Giangrazio appears and asks Zeza if she has seen his servant. Seeing that Ascanio has not yet completed his mission, he decides to wait for him. Zeza tries in vain to send him away. She finally withdraws angrily to the inn. Now Meo is also reassured about her relationship with Giangrazio. Finally Ascanio comes. Giangrazio urges him to give Zeza his message while he tries to hide. Meo realizes that Giangrazio does not want to give up Zeza under any circumstances. He gets himself a sword and demands Giangrazio's supposed helper Ascanio to fight. Giangrazio, Faustina and Elisa try to separate the two. Don Marciello returns and also draws his sword against Ascanio, who can fend him off, however.

Meo is now completely convinced of Zeza's loyalty. The two are reconciled.

During the fight Ascanio is slightly injured at his shoulder. Thereby a birthmark in form of two golden wings has become visible. Giangrazio recognizes from this that Ascanio is his second son Alidoro, who was believed lost and whom his mother had named after this mark ("ali d'oro" - "golden wings"). Elisa now understands her affection for him, because they are close relatives. When Don Marciello returns to continue the fight with Ascanio, Giangrazio introduces him as his brother. Alidoro admits to having worked as Ascanio's servant only for appearances' sake in order to be close to his beloved Faustina. As a child, after being lost on the beach in Genoa, he was raised by a Genoese man under the name of Luigi.

At the request of Don Marcello, Giangrazio gives his blessing to Alidoro and Faustina. Don Marcellio's own hopes for Zeza are disappointed, however, as she has meanwhile become engaged to Meo. Instead, Giangrazio suggests that he marry Elisa. The opera ends in general joy.

== Recordings ==
Francesca Russo Ermolli (Elisa), M. Grazia Schiavo (Faustina), Valentina Varriale (Zeza), Maria Ercolano (Luigi), G. De Vittorio (Don Marcello), Gianpiero Ruggeri (Meo) & Francesco Morace (Giangrazio) Baroque Orchestra Cappella Della Pietà Dei Turchini, Antonio Florio
