= Giovanni Battista Pergolesi =

Italian composer, violinist and organist (1710–1736)

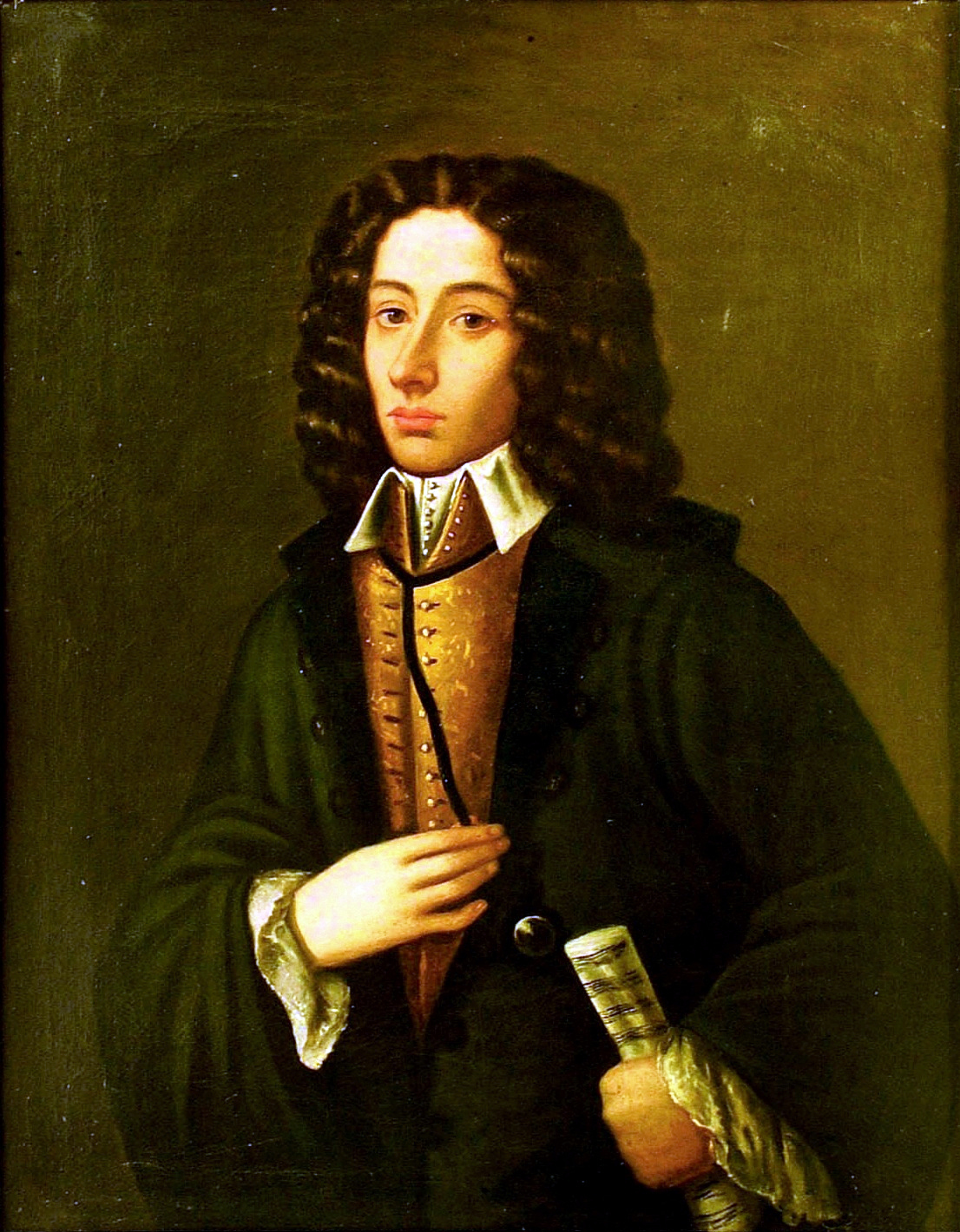
- Disputed portrait of Pergolesi
- Born: Giovanni Battista Draghi; 4 January 1710; Jesi, Papal States
- Died: 16 March 1736 (aged 26); Pozzuoli, Kingdom of Naples
- Occupations: Composer; violinist; organist
- Era: Baroque (Neapolitan school)
- Known for: L'Olimpiade; Stabat Mater; La serva padrona

Giovanni Battista Draghi (Italian: [dʒoˈvanni batˈtista ˈdraːɡi]; 4 January 1710 – 16 or 17 March 1736), usually referred to as Giovanni Battista Pergolesi (Italian: [perɡoˈleːzi, -eːsi]), was an Italian Baroque composer, violinist, and organist, leading exponent of the Baroque; he is considered one of the greatest Italian musicians of the first half of the 18th century and one of the most important representatives of the Neapolitan school.

Despite his short life and few years of activity (he died of tuberculosis at the age of 26), he managed to create works of high artistic value and historical importance, such as La serva padrona (The Maid Turned Mistress), which played an important role in the development and diffusion of the opera buffa in Europe, L'Olimpiade, considered "one of the finest opere serie of the early eighteenth century", and Stabat Mater, which is among the most important works of sacred music of all time. In his lifetime, he wrote a total of 10 works for the stage, including 3 two-part intermezzos.

== Biography ==
Two caricatures by Pier Leone Ghezzi
("the only extant authentic portraits")

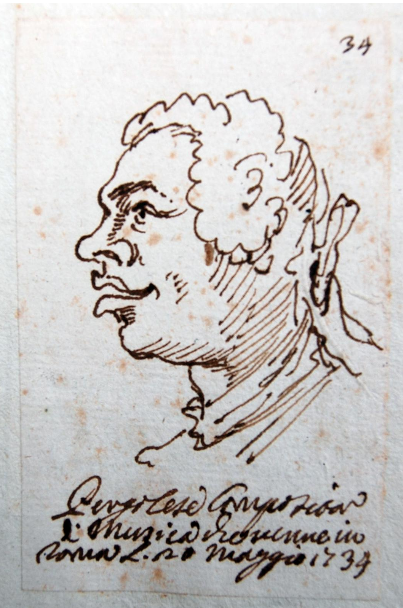
"Pergolese music composer who came to Rome on 20 May 1734"
(The British Museum)

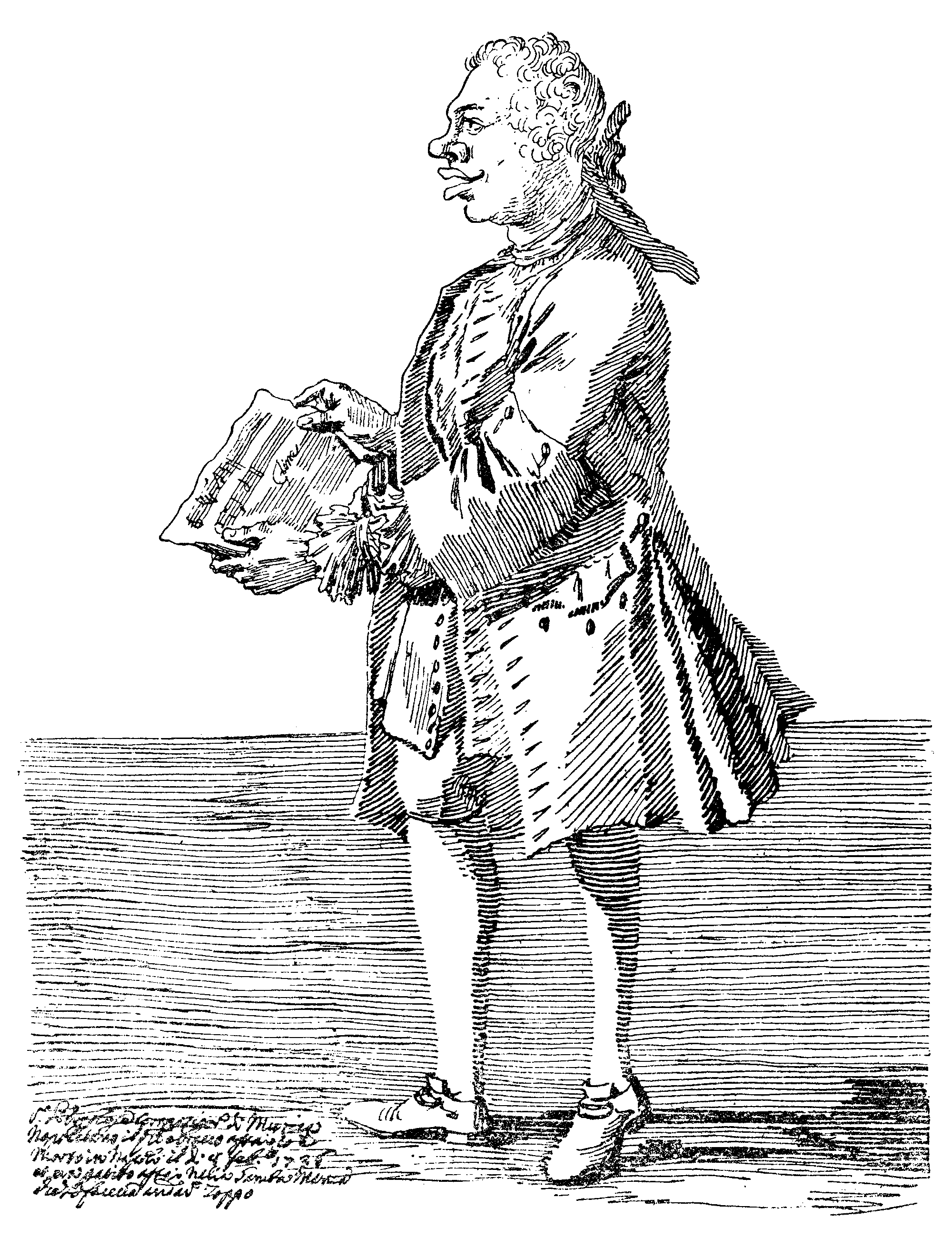
"Signor Pergolese, Neapolitan music composer, who is clever indeed and died in Naples on 7 February 1736, and had suffered greatly with his left leg which made him walk with a limp)."
(Vatican Apostolic Library)

The two caricature sketches by Pier Leone Ghezzi (the latter evidently derived from the former) are "the only two authentic portraits of the musician that have come down to us. The marked features of the face are very far from subsequent idealizations: pronounced deformity of the left leg is also shown, a sign of probable previous poliomyelitis [...]".

Born in Jesi in what is now the Province of Ancona (but was then part of the Papal States), he was commonly given the nickname "Pergolesi", a demonym indicating in Italian the residents of nearby Pergola, which was the birthplace of his ancestors. He studied music in Jesi under a local musician, Francesco Santi, before going to Naples in 1725, where he studied under Gaetano Greco and Francesco Feo among others. On leaving the conservatory in 1731, he won some renown by performing the oratorio in two parts La fenice sul rogo, o vero La morte di San Giuseppe ("The Phoenix on the Pyre, or The Death of Saint Joseph"), and the dramma sacro in three acts, Li prodigi della divina grazia nella conversione e morte di san Guglielmo duca d’Aquitania ("The Miracles of Divine Grace in the Conversion and Death of Saint William, Duke of Aquitaine"). He spent most of his brief life working for aristocratic patrons such as Ferdinando Colonna, Prince of Stigliano, and Domenico Marzio Carafa, Duke of Maddaloni.

Pergolesi was one of the most important early composers of opera buffa (comic opera). His opera seria, Il prigionier superbo, contained the two-act buffa intermezzo, La serva padrona (The Servant Mistress, 28 August 1733), which became a very popular work in its own right. When it was performed in Paris in 1752, it prompted the so-called Querelle des Bouffons ("quarrel of the comic actors") between supporters of serious French opera by the likes of Jean-Baptiste Lully and Jean-Philippe Rameau and supporters of new Italian comic opera. Pergolesi was held up as a model of the Italian style during this quarrel, which divided Paris's musical community for two years.

Among Pergolesi's other operatic works are his first opera seria La Salustia (1732), Lo frate 'nnamorato (The brother in love, 1732, to a text in the Neapolitan language), L'Olimpiade (January 1735) and Il Flaminio (1735, to a text in the Neapolitan language). All his operas were premiered in Naples, apart from L'Olimpiade, which was first given in Rome.

Pergolesi also wrote sacred music, including a Mass in F and three Salve Regina settings. The Lenten Hymn 'God of Mercy and Compassion' by Redemptorist priest Edmund Vaughan is most commonly set to a tune adapted by Pergolesi. It is his Stabat Mater (1736), however, for soprano, alto, string orchestra and basso continuo, that became his best-known sacred work. It was commissioned by the Confraternita dei Cavalieri di San Luigi di Palazzo, which presented an annual Good Friday meditation in honour of the Virgin Mary. Pergolesi's work replaced the one composed by Alessandro Scarlatti in 1724, but which was already perceived as "old-fashioned," so rapidly had public tastes changed. While classical in scope, the opening section of the setting demonstrates Pergolesi's mastery of the Italian baroque durezze e ligature style, characterized by numerous suspensions over a faster, conjunct bassline. The work remained popular, becoming the most frequently printed musical work of the 18th century, and being arranged by a number of other composers, including Johann Sebastian Bach, who reorchestrated and adapted it for a non-Marian text in his cantata Tilge, Höchster, meine Sünden (Root out my sins, Highest One), BWV 1083.

Pergolesi wrote a number of secular instrumental works, including a violin sonata and a violin concerto. A considerable number of instrumental and sacred works once attributed to Pergolesi have since been shown to be misattributed. Many colourful anecdotes related by Pergolesi's 19th-century biographer Francesco Florimo were later revealed as hoaxes.

Pergolesi died on 16 or 17 March 1736 at the age of 26 in Pozzuoli from tuberculosis and was buried at the Franciscan monastery one day later.

Pergolesi was the subject of a 1932 Italian film biopic Pergolesi. It was directed by Guido Brignone with Elio Steiner playing the role of the composer.

== Legend and posthumous fame ==
In life, despite numerous awards, Pergolesi's fame was almost exclusively limited to the Neapolitan and Roman musical milieu. Nonetheless, he has influenced poets and artists who, during the 19th century, reinterpreted the composer in a romantic light.

As the historian and traveller Charles Burney wrote:

from the moment his death became known, all Italy manifested a keen desire to hear and possess his works.

Indeed, the myth that was born throughout Europe around his life and work after his death represents an exceptional phenomenon in the history of music. Mozart would experience a similar phenomenon after his death. Thus, more than three hundred works have been attributed to him, of which only about thirty have been recognized by modern critics as true Pergolesi's compositions, a phenomenon which testifies to the reputation of the composer.

However, already in the middle of the 18th century Pergolesi was immensely better known than he had been in life: as mentioned, the numerous prints of his compositions began to spread throughout Europe. Several years after Pergolesi's death, the performance in Paris, in 1752, of La Serva padrona by an Italian comic opera troupe, triggered the famous Querelle des Bouffons between the defenders of French music and the supporters of the opera buffa. For Jean-Jacques Rousseau, in particular, the freshness and the grace of his music were the dazzling demonstration of the superiority of Italian opera over French lyric tragedy. The French composer André Grétry said:

Pergolesi was born, and the truth was known!

Above all, the scarcity of tangible information about his life and works was fertile ground for the flourishing of imaginative anecdotes of all kinds. The doubt crept in that his tragic end was due not to natural causes but to poisoning by musicians envious of his talent. Apollonian beauty and numerous tragic loves were attributed to him.

Because of this extraordinary posthumous fame, the catalogue of his works had an unpredictable destiny: during the 18th and 19th centuries, spread in Europe, the practice of publishing under his name, for the purpose of speculation, any score having the musical style of the Neapolitan school. By the end of the 19th century, this led to over five hundred compositions in the informal catalogue of his works. Contemporary studies have reduced Pergolesi's compositions to less than fifty, and of these only twenty-eight are the works whose paternity is considered sure.

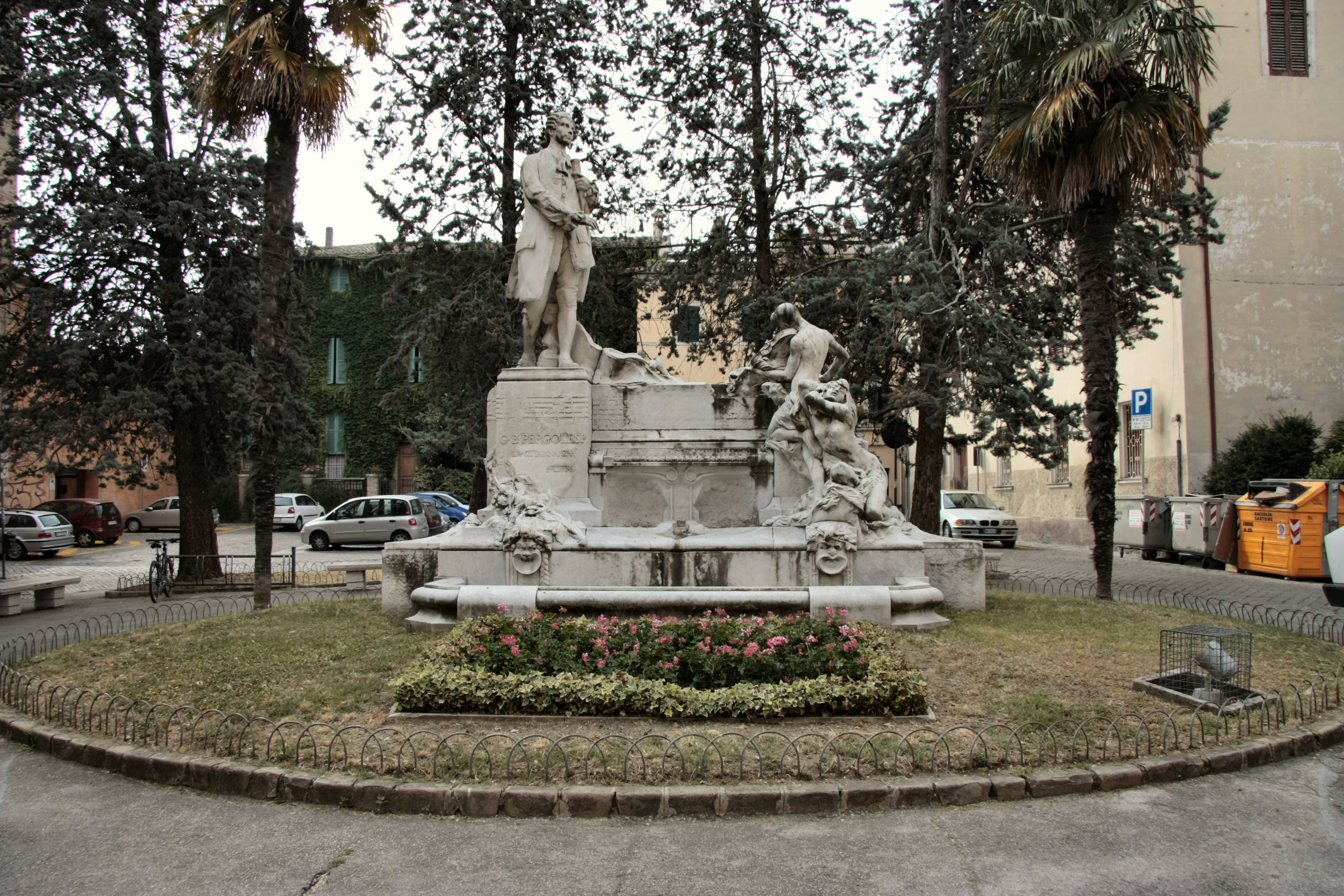
Monument to Giovanni Battista Pergolesi in Jesi

There are still serious doubts about the attribution of various works, even among the best known, such as the Salve Regina in F minor. Several music and record editions perpetuate these uncertainties about the authorship of various compositions, publishing in his name compositions certainly produced by other authors, such as the arias Se tu m'ami (certainly composed by the musicologist Alessandro Parisotti in the second half of the 19th century and included in one of his collections of baroque arias under the name of Pergolesi) and Tre giorni son che Nina (attributed to Vincenzo Legrenzio Ciampi) or the Magnificat in D major, composed by his teacher Francesco Durante.

The situation of extreme uncertainty that distinguishes the catalog of Pergolesi's works can be easily described with the case of Pulcinella by Igor Stravinsky: composed in 1920 as a tribute to the style of the composer from Jesi, the most recent music critics have established that of the 21 pieces used for this composition, as many as 11 are to be attributed to other authors (mainly Domenico Gallo), two are of dubious attribution and only eight (mostly taken from his operas) can be attributed to Pergolesi.

== Pergolesi's works on screen ==
Pergolesi's Salve Regina is a highlighted performance in the movie Farinelli (1994), in which Farinelli also performs Stabat Mater Dolorosa in the only duet. The first and last parts of Pergolesi's Stabat Mater were used in the soundtrack of the movie Jesus of Montreal (Jésus de Montréal) (1989); the fifth part ("Quis est homo") was used in the soundtrack of the movie Smilla's Sense of Snow (1997); the last part was also used in the movie Amadeus (1984) and in the movie The Mirror (1975) by Andrei Tarkovsky. The film Cactus (1986) by the Australian director Paul Cox also features Pergolesi's Stabat Mater on the soundtrack, as do the film The Talented Mr. Ripley (1999) directed by Anthony Minghella, and Nothing Left Unsaid, a 2016 documentary on Gloria Vanderbilt and Anderson Cooper, which features the last movement ("Quando Corpus / Amen").

== Works ==
The standard catalogue of Pergolesi's works was produced by Marvin Paymer in 1977, ascribing a unique P number to each item so that – for example – the well-known Stabat Mater is P.77.

=== Sacred music ===
- Antifona "In caelestibus regnis" (1731)
- Confitebor tibi Domine (Psalm 111) in C for Soprano, Alto, Choir, Strings and Continuo (1732)
- Dixit Dominus (Psalm 110) for Soprano, Bass, 2 Choirs and 2 Orchestras (1732)
- Laudate pueri Dominum (Psalm 113) in D for Soprano, Mezzo, Choir and Orchestra (1734)
- Mass in D (1732)
- Mass in F "San Emidio" (Missa romana) for Soprano, Alto, 2 Choirs, 2 Orchestras and Continuo (1732)
- Oratorio La fenice sul rogo, o vero La morte di San Giuseppe (1731, atrium of the Chiesa dei Girolamini, Naples)
- Dramma sacro Li prodigi della divina grazia nella conversione e morte di san Guglielmo duca d'Aquitania (1731, Monastery of Sant'Agnello Maggiore, Naples)
- Salve regina in a for Soprano, Strings and Continuo (1731)
- Salve regina in c for Soprano, Strings and Continuo (1735)
- Salve regina in f for Alto, Strings and Continuo (1736, adapted from the Salve regina in c)
- Stabat Mater in f (wr. 1735, pr. 1736, Naples)

=== Operas ===
- La Salustia, January 1732, Teatro San Bartolomeo, Naples; text possibly by Sebastiano Morelli after Alessandro Severo by Apostolo Zeno
- Lo frate 'nnamorato, 27 September 1732, Teatro dei Fiorentini, Naples
- Il prigionier superbo, containing the intermezzo La serva padrona, 28 August 1733, Teatro San Bartolomeo, Naples
- Adriano in Siria, containing the intermezzo Livietta e Tracollo, 25 October 1734, Teatro San Bartolomeo, Naples
- L'Olimpiade, January 1735, Teatro Tordinona, Rome
- Il Flaminio, autumn 1735, Teatro Nuovo, Naples

=== Orchestral music ===
- Sinfonia in B-flat major
- Sinfonia in D major
- Sinfonia in F major
- Sinfonia in G major, P.35
- Sinfonia in G minor, P.24c
- Flute Concerto in G major, P.33 (very doubtful)
- Concerto for Flute and 2 Violins in D major
- Concerto for Flute and 2 Violins in G major
- Concerto for 2 Harpsichords and Orchestra
- Violin Concerto in B flat major

==== Spurious ====
- 6 Concerti armonici for 4 violins, viola and continuo, long attributed to Pergolesi but in fact by Wassenaer

=== Keyboard works ===
- Harpsichord Sonata in A major, P.1
- Harpsichord Sonata in D major
- Organ Sonata in F major
- Organ Sonata in G major

=== Chamber works ===
- Trio Sonata in G major, P.12
- Trio Sonata in G minor
- Unspecified Andantino, for violin and piano
- Violin Sonata in G major
- Sonata No.1 in G major, for 2 violins
- Sinfonia in F major, for cello and continuo
