= Il Flaminio =

- Opera buffa by G. B. Pergolesi
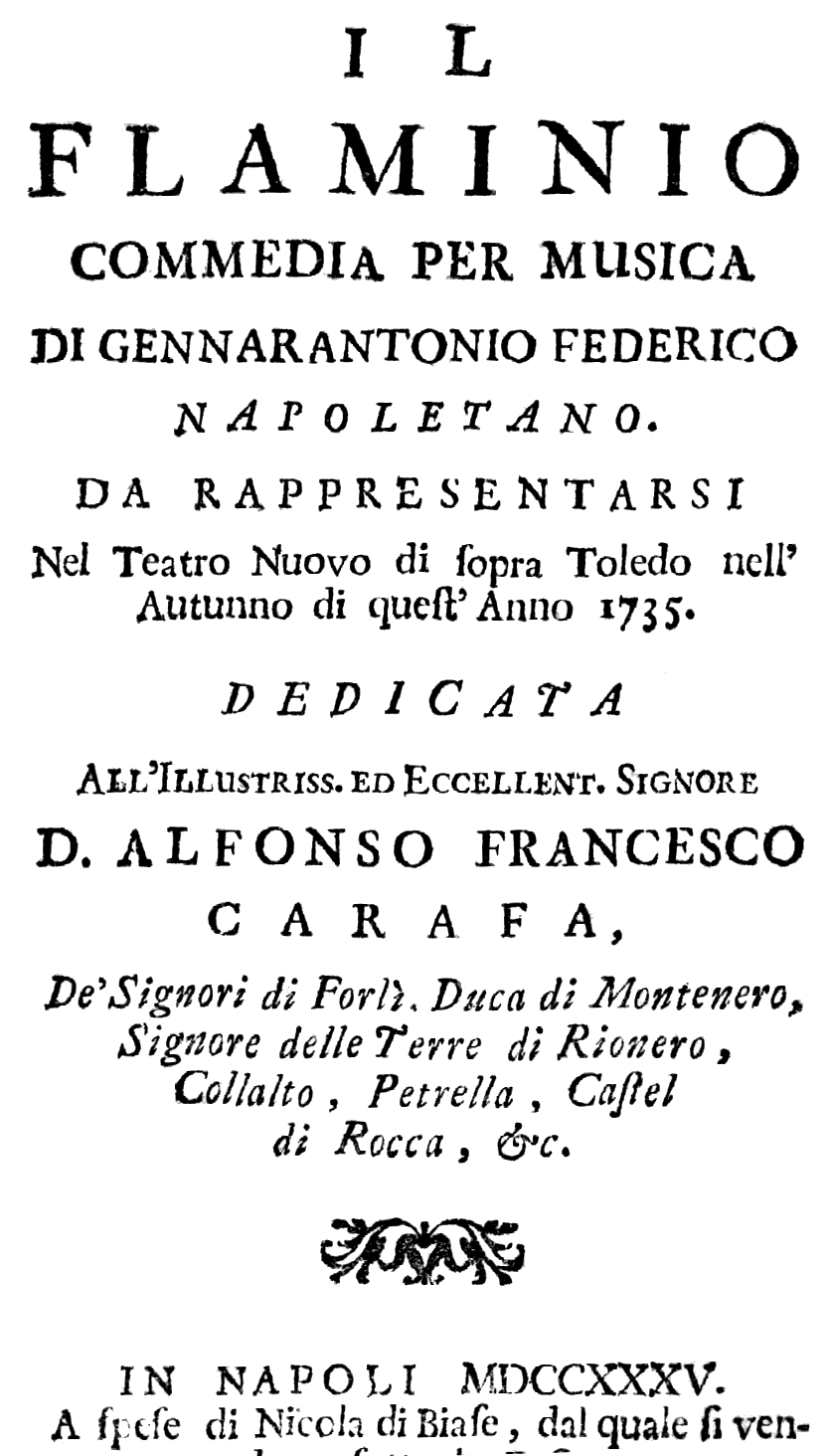
- Title page of the libretto
- Librettist: Gennaro Antonio Federico
- Language: Neapolitan and Italian
- Premiere: 1735; Teatro Nuovo, Naples

Il Flaminio is a 1735 opera buffa by Giovanni Battista Pergolesi to a Neapolitan libretto by Gennaro Antonio Federico, first performed at the Teatro Nuovo, Naples. Untypically in Pergolesi's difficult and short career the opera was an immediate success and continued to be staged up to 1750.

== Roles ==
Role	Voice type	Premiere cast 1735
Giustina, a young widow	contralto	
Flaminio, under the false name of Giulio, her lover	soprano (en travesti)	Antonia Colasanti
Polidoro, in love with Giustina	tenor	Pietro Vitale
Agata, his sister, Ferdinando's fiancée, but in love with Giulio	soprano	Anna Cialfieri
Ferdinando	soprano (breeches role)	Paola Fernandez
Checca, Giustina's maid	soprano	Margherita Pozzi
Vastiano, Polidoro's servant, in love with Checca	bass	Girolamo Piani

== Recordings ==
- DVD from Teatro Studio Valeria Moriconi, Jesi 2010 Juan Francisco Gatell (Polidoro), Laura Polverelli (Flaminio), Marina De Liso (Giustina), Sonia Yoncheva (Agata) & Serena Malfi (Ferdinando) Accademia Bizantina, Ottavio Dantone (conductor) & Michal Znaniecki (stage director)
