= Leonardo Leo =

Italian Baroque composer (1694–1744)

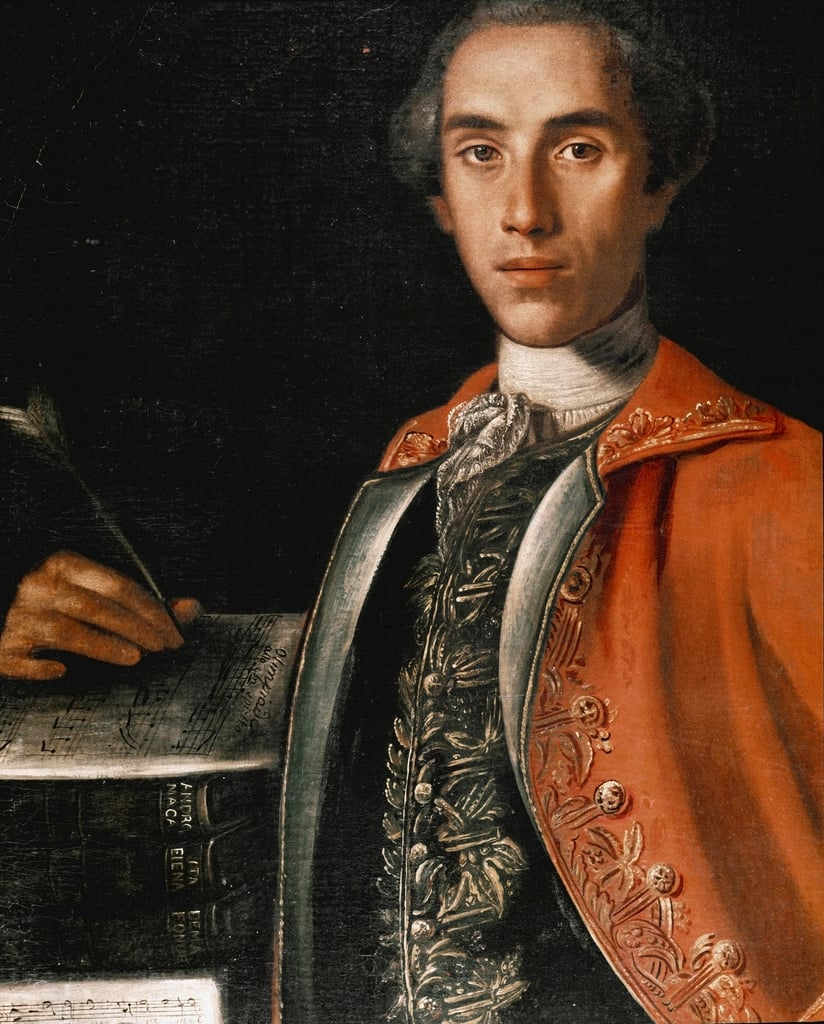
Leonardo Leo

Leonardo Leo (5 August 1694 – 31 October 1744), more correctly Leonardo Ortensio Salvatore de Leo, was a Baroque composer.

== Biography ==
Leo was born in San Vito degli Schiavoni (currently known as San Vito dei Normanni) in the Apulia region, then part of the Kingdom of Naples.

He became a student at the Conservatorio della Pietà dei Turchini at Naples in 1703, and was a pupil first of Francesco Provenzale and later of Nicola Fago. It has been supposed that he was a pupil of Pitoni and Alessandro Scarlatti, but he could not possibly have studied with either of these composers, although he was undoubtedly influenced by their compositions. His earliest known work was a sacred drama, L'infedeltà abbattuta, performed by his fellow-students in 1712.

In 1714, he produced, at the court theatre, an opera, Pisistrato, which was much admired.

He held various posts at the royal chapel, and continued to write for the stage, besides teaching at the conservatory. After adding comic scenes to Francesco Gasparini's Bajazette in 1722 for performance at Naples, he composed comic operas in Neapolitan such as La'mpeca scoperta in 1723, and L'Alidoro in 1740. His most famous comic opera was Amor vuol sofferenza (1739), better known as La Finta Frascatana, highly praised by De Brosses. He was equally distinguished as a composer of serious opera, Demofoonte (1735), Farnace (1737) and L'Olimpiade (1737) being his most famous works in this branch, and is still better known as a composer of sacred music.

He died of a stroke while engaged in the composition of new arias for a revival of La Finta Frascatana. Leo was the first of the Neapolitan school to obtain a complete mastery over modern harmonic counterpoint.

== Operas ==
=== Drammi per musica ===
1. Il Pisistrato (Naples, 13 May 1714)
2. Eumene (Reggio Emilia, May Fair 1714, collaboration with composer Francesco Gasparini)
3. Sofonisba (Naples, Royal Palace of Naples, 22 January 1718)
4. Cajo Gracco (Naples, Royal Palace of Naples, 19 April 1720)
5. Arianna e Teseo (Naples, 26 November 1721)
6. Bajazette (Naples, Royal Palace of Naples, 28 August 1722)
7. Tamerlano (Rome, 1722)
8. Timocrate (Venice, Teatro San Angelo, Carnival 1723)
9. Zenobia in Palmira (Naples, Teatro San Bartolomeo, 1725)
10. Astianatte (1725)
11. La somiglianza (Naples, Teatro dei Fiorentini, 1726)
12. L'Orismene, overo dagli sdegni gli amori (Naples, Teatro Nuovo, 1726)
13. Ciro riconosciuto (1727)
14. Argene (1728)
15. La zingara (intermezzo, 1731)
16. Intermezzi per l'Argene (1731)
17. Catone (Venice, 1732)
18. Demetrio (Maples, Teatro San Bartolomeo, 1732)
19. Amore dà senno (Naples, Teatro Nuovo, 1733)
20. Emira (with intermezzi by Ignazio Prota, 1735)
21. La clemenza di Tito (1735)
22. Onore vince amore (Naples, Teatro dei Fiorentini, 1736)
23. La simpatia del sangue (1737)
24. Siface (1737)
25. L'Olimpiade (1737)
26. Amor vuol sofferenza 1739
27. Festa teatrale (1739)
28. La contesa dell'Amore e della virtù (1740)
29. Scipione nelle Spagne (1740)
30. L'Alidoro (1740)
31. Achille in Sciro (1740)
32. Alessandro (1741)
33. Demoofonte (1741)
34. L'impresario delle Isole Canarie (1741)
35. Andromaca (1742)
36. L'ambizione delusa (Leo) 1742 (opera seria)
37. Decebalo (Leo) 1743
38. Vologeso (1744)
39. La finta Frascatana (1744)

Undated operas:

1. Artaserse
2. Lucio Papirio
3. Evergete
4. Il matrimonio anascoso
5. Alessandro nell'Indie
6. Il Medo
7. Nitocri, regina di egitto
8. Il Pisistrate
9. Il trionfo di Camillo
10. Le nozze di Psiche

== Selected recordings ==
- 2002 Concerto for 4 Violins and Strings in D -Conductor: Reinhard Goebel, Orchestra: Cologne Musica Antiqua

Label: Archiv Masters (Disc Title: Italian Violin Concertos)

- 2001 Concerto 4 violins and Strings in D - Performers: Elizabeth Wallfisch, Nicholas Kraemer

Orchestra: The Raglan Baroque Players Label: Hyperion (Disc Title: The Neapolitans - Pergolesi, Durante, Leo)

- 2001: 6 Cello Concertos-Performer: Hidemi Suzuki, Makoto Akatsu Orchestra: Orchestra Van Wassenaer

Label: BIS (Disc Title: Leo-Six Cello Concertos)

- 2000: Così del vostro suono (Il Tionfo della Gloria), cantata Sorge Lidia la notte, cantata with violins,

più dell'usato, cantata for solo voice & strings- Conductor: Cosimo Prontera Performer: Cristina Miatello, Emanuele Bianchi Orchestra: La Confraternita de' Musici Label: Tactus (Disc Title: Leonardo Leo: Serenate e Cantate)

For a more complete discography of Leo, see http://www.leonardoleo.com/discography.htm

== See also ==
- See: List of music students by teacher: K to M#Leonardo Leo.
