= Vittoria Tesi =

Italian opera singer

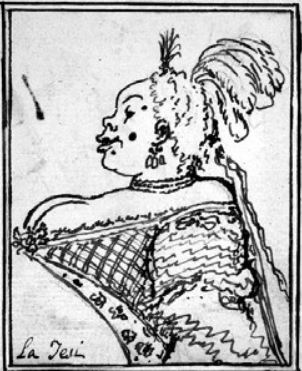
Caricature: "La Tesi" (Nov. 1741) (by Antonio Maria Zanetti)

Vittoria Tesi Tramontini, also known as "La Fiorentina" or "La Moretta" (the Florentine or the Moorish or brunette girl) (13 February 1701 in Florence – 9 May 1775 in Vienna) was an Italian opera singer (later singing teacher) of the 18th century. Her vocal range was that of a contralto. She is "regarded as the first eminent singer of color in the history of Western music".

== Biography ==
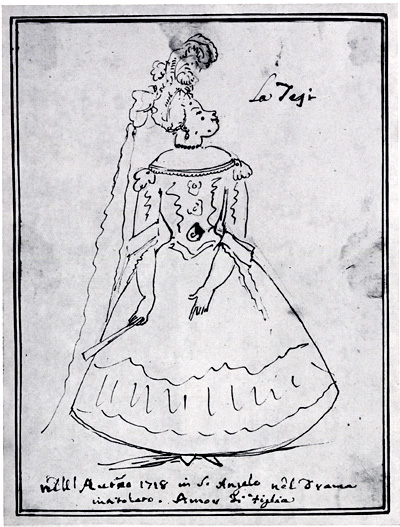
Caricature: "La Tesi in 1718 at S. Angelo in the drama entitled Amore di figlia" (by Antonio Maria Zanetti)

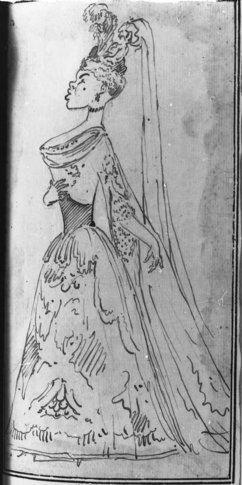
Another caricature of the young Tesi at the beginning of her stage career (by Marco Ricci)

She was born in Florence in 1701, daughter of Alessandro, a lackey of African origin, nicknamed "il Moretto" (the Moorish one"), and of a Florentine woman, Maria Antonia Rapacciuoli. Her father was in the service of castrato Francesco ("Cecchino") De Castris (c1650 – 1724), who stood as the newborn girl's godfather along with famous soprano Vittoria Tarquini as the godmother: Tesi was evidently named after the latter. Thanks also probably to such uncommon connections with the entertainment scene, she had the opportunity to study singing (as well as acting and dance) first in Florence and then in Bologna where his family moved in 1715. The following year she commenced her operatic career at an exceedingly young age, performing in a revival of Emanuele d'Astorga's Il Dafni at Parma and later also appearing at Bologna. By 1718 she was virtuosa di camera for the Prince of Parma at Venice. The following year she was at Dresden, singing for Antonio Lotti alongside Senesino and Margherita Durastanti. By 1721 she was back in Italy for the Florentine Carnival, and for the next 26 years she performed almost exclusively in Italy dividing the years between its Central Northern cities and Naples, and appearing very often, from 1724 to 1732, alongside her great friend Farinelli. Only in 1739–1740, accepting a fabulous engagement, did she travel outside of Italy and perform at the Madrid court, where Farinelli himself had permanently settled.

Her career peaked in the late 1730s and in 1740s, when she sang alongside such singers as Caffarelli and Angelo Amorevoli. In 1737 she participated in the inauguration of the Teatro San Carlo in Naples, assuming the travesti title role in Sarro's Achille in Sciro; in 1744 she performed the title role in Gluck's Ipermestra at the Teatro San Giovanni Grisostomo in Venice and in 1747 she took her leave of Italian audiences, appearing at the Naples court and the Teatro San Carlo in the festa teatrale Il sogno di Olimpia by Giuseppe de Majo, opposite Caffarelli, Gizziello and Giovanni Manzuoli. The following year she moved to Vienna, where she debuted at the inauguration of the new Burgtheater in the title role in Gluck's Semiramide riconosciuta, set to a libretto by Metastasio. Metastasio, who had been absent from Italy since 1730 and therefore had no recent direct experience of her performances, was amazed, and in a letter to his colleague Giovanni Claudio Pasquini, he wrote: "Tesi plays in a way that surprised me, as well as the whole humanity in Vienna, of either of the two sexes".

After further successful appearances at the Burgtheater in the latter half of 1748 and in 1749 (among others, in Niccolò Jommelli's Achille in Sciro and Didone abbandonata, both set to Metastasian libretti), and after having undergone a real tour de force of four new operas and two pasticcios in 1750, Tesi began to retire from her professional singing career. In 1751 she was reported by Metastasio to be serving as the costume director at the Viennese theatre and in 1754 she appeared on stage - probably for the last time - as Lisinga in the premiere of Gluck's one-act opera Le cinesi, at Engelhartstetten, in the Schloss Hof, on the occasion of a visit of the imperial couple. The Hof was the country residence of Prince Joseph of Saxe-Hildburghausen, a leading figure in the Habsburg court, in whose Vienna palace (Palais Rosenkavalier, today's Palais Auersperg) she permanently dwelled, after auctioning in 1753 all the movable property of her Florence home. "There she regularly took part in private concerts under the direction of the Prince's capellmeister Joseph Bonno. The Prince had offered Tesi a salary for staying in his household, but she refused to be paid and declined every present the Prince wished to give her." She taught singing there, having among her pupils Caterina Gabrielli and Elisabeth Teyber (1744–1816), and she would heartily receive personalities, such as Casanova or the Mozarts (father and 6-year-old son), who passed through Vienna and wished to pay homage to the old primadonna living at the Prince Saxe-Hildburghausen's.

Tesi died of pneumonia on 9 May 1775. She was exceedingly rich and in accordance with her last will, she was buried in the crypt of the Capuchin Church at the Neuer Markt, having provided a Mass endowment fund of 1,000 florins for the annexed Capuchin Convent.

== Artistic features ==
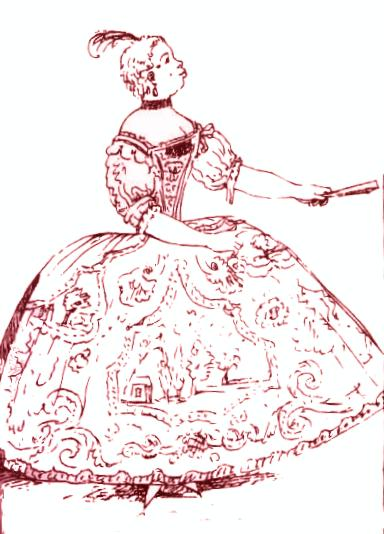
Caricature of Tesi (by Antonio Maria Zanetti)

In 1777 Sarah and Ange Goudar wrote that, albeit "with an ingrateful voice", she could make herself agreeable, and called her "perhaps the first actress who acted well while singing badly". Sources generally agree in extolling Tesi's acting skills above her singing qualities. According to the majority, however, the latter too were far from bad and poor. Charles Burney reported "she had in her youth been very superior to all her contemporaries in both capacities of singer and actress." Later, relying almost literally upon the opinions expressed by Johann Joachim Quantz, a direct witness of the singer's early performances, he added: "Vittoria Tesi had by nature a masculine, strong, contralto voice. In 1719 she generally sung, at Dresden all'ottava, such airs as are made for base [sic] voice. The compass of her voice was so extraordinary, that neither to sing high or low, gave her trouble. She was not remarkable for her performance of rapid and difficult passages". Singing master Giovanni Battista Mancini, who, in his youth, had happened to perform on stage alongside Tesi and Farinelli, reported she naturally possessed "most perfect intonation" and had gained, by studying, full mastery of the art of singing.

Notwithstanding, it was in fact as a 'singer-actress' — to put it in modern terms — that she went down in history: "the first 'divina' in the contralto clef", as she has been recently called. According to Stefano Arteaga and the aforementioned Mancini, in particular, who both wrote around the time of her death, she was the century's greatest operatic actress, and her theatrical skills, either natural or acquired through hard study and training, were such that no other actress could ever emerge on the opera stage to surpass or even just equal her.
