= Didone abbandonata (Albinoni) =

1724 opera by Tomaso Albioni

- Opera seria by Tomaso Albinoni
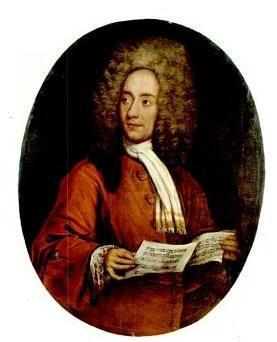
- Tomaso Albioni
- Librettist: Pietro Metastasio
- Language: Italian
- Based on: Didone abbandonata
- Premiere: 26 December 1724; Teatro San Cassiano, Venice

Didone abbandonata (Dido Abandoned) was an opera in three acts composed by Tomaso Albinoni. Albinoni's music (now lost) was set to Pietro Metastasio's libretto, Didone abbandonata, which was in turn based on the story of Dido and Aeneas from the fourth book of Virgil's Aeneid. The opera premiered on 26 December 1724 at the Teatro San Cassiano in Venice and was the first time that an opera based on a Metastasio libretto was performed in Venice.

== Background and performance history ==
Metastasio's libretto was first set by Domenico Sarro, whose opera premiered at the Teatro San Bartolomeo in Naples on 1 February 1724. However, for the libretto's presentation in Venice, Giovanni Orsato, the impresario of the Teatro San Cassiano, commissioned his fellow Venetian, Tomaso Albinoni, to compose a completely new setting. According to the April 1725 edition of Mercure Galant, Albinoni's version had a considerable success not only in Venice, but also in Florence and Milan. It was frequently revived over the next few years, including performances in Crema (1726), Breslau (1726), Linz (date unknown), Pesaro (1730), Prague (1731), and Ferrara (1733).

The title role was sung in the premiere by Marianna Bulgarelli, famed for her talent as an actress. Bulgarelli was also the patron and mistress of the young Metastasio who was living in her home while he wrote Didone. He intended it as a showcase for her, and according to contemporary accounts, Bulgarelli had considerable influence on the work, especially in shaping Dido's scenes of jealousy in act 2. Marianna Bulgarelli and her Aeneas, Nicolò Grimaldi, reprised their roles on 10 May 1725 in Reggio Emilia for the premiere of Nicola Porpora's setting of the Didone libretto. Markstrom suggests that she was probably also present in Rome to coach the castrato "Farfallino" who sang the title role in Leonardo Vinci's 1726 setting of the libretto. (The papal ban on female performers in Rome's theatres prevented Bulgarelli from singing the role of Dido herself).

== Roles ==
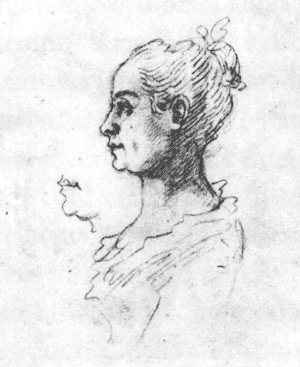
Marianna Bulgarelli, who created the title role

Roles, voice types, premiere cast
Role	Voice type	Premiere cast 26 December 1724
Didone, Dido, queen of Carthage, in love with Enea	soprano	Marianna Bulgarelli
Enea, Aeneas, a Trojan hero	alto castrato	Nicolò Grimaldi
Iarba, Iarbas king of the Moors, who appears as "Arbace"	contralto (en travesti)	Lucia Lancetti
Selene, sister of Dido and secretly in love with Aeneas	contralto	Teresa Peruzzi
Araspe, confidant of Iarba and lover of Selene	soprano castrato	Domenico Gizzi
Osmida, confidant of Dido	tenor	Pietro Baratti

== Synopsis ==
Setting: Ancient Carthage

Dido (Didone), Queen of Carthage, is promised in marriage to King Iarbas (Iarba), but has fallen in love with the Trojan warrior Aeneas (Enea), who had been shipwrecked on the shores of her city. Iarbas appears disguised as "Arbace" to warn Dido that Aeneas cannot become King of Carthage. Nevertheless, Dido refuses to marry Iarbas. Although Aeneas is now in love with Dido, he asks her sister Selene to tell her of his plans to leave Carthage for Italy. War then breaks out between Aeneas and Iarbas in which the Trojan is triumphant. After his victory, Dido convinces Aeneas to remain in Carthage and become her husband. But when the ghost of Aeneas' father reminds him of his duty to his people, Aeneas realises that he must abandon Dido. Heartbroken, she commits suicide by throwing herself on a funeral pyre as Aeneas and his men set sail for Italy.

== Sources ==
- Casaglia, Gherardo (2005). "Didone abbandonata, 26 December 1724". L'Almanacco di Gherardo Casaglia (in Italian).
- Freeman, Daniel E., The Opera Theater of Count Franz Anton von Sporck in Prague, Pendragon Press, 1992. ISBN 0-945193-17-3
- Giazotto, Remo, Tomaso Albinoni, Fratelli Bocca, 1945
- Markstrom, Kurt Sven, The Operas of Leonardo Vinci, Napoletano, Pendragon Press, 2007. ISBN 1-57647-094-6
- Selfridge-Field, Eleanor, A New Chronology of Venetian Opera and Related Genres, 1660–1760, Stanford University Press, 2007. ISBN 0-8047-4437-8
- Strohm, Reinhard. "The Neapolitans in Venice" in Iain Fenlon and Tim Carter (eds.), Con che soavità: Studies in Italian Opera, Song, and Dance, 1580–1740, Oxford University Press, 1995. ISBN 0-19-816370-3
