= Teatro di San Carlo =

Opera house in Naples, Italy

Coordinates: 40°50′15″N 14°14′58″E

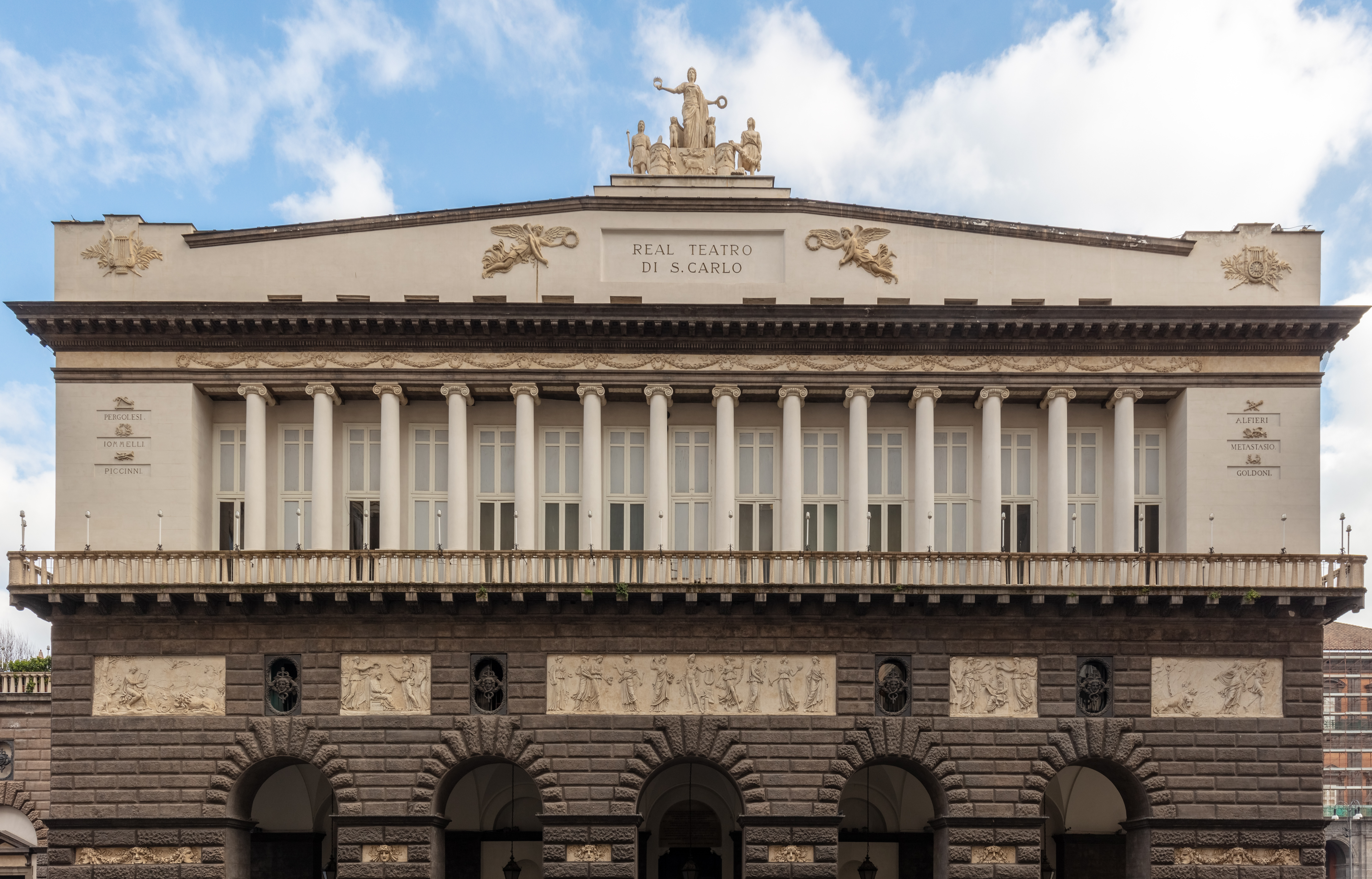
Exterior of the Teatro di San Carlo

The Real Teatro di San Carlo ("Royal Theatre of Saint Charles"), as originally named by the Bourbon monarchy but today known simply as the Teatro (di) San Carlo, is a historic opera house in Naples, Italy, connected to the Royal Palace and adjacent to the Piazza del Plebiscito. It is the oldest continuously active venue for opera in the world, having opened in 1737, decades before either Milan's La Scala or Venice's La Fenice.

The opera season runs from late November to July, with the ballet season from December to early June. The house once had a seating capacity of 3,285, but has now been reduced to 1,386 seats. Given its size, structure and antiquity, it was the model for theatres that were later built in Europe.

== History of the opera house ==
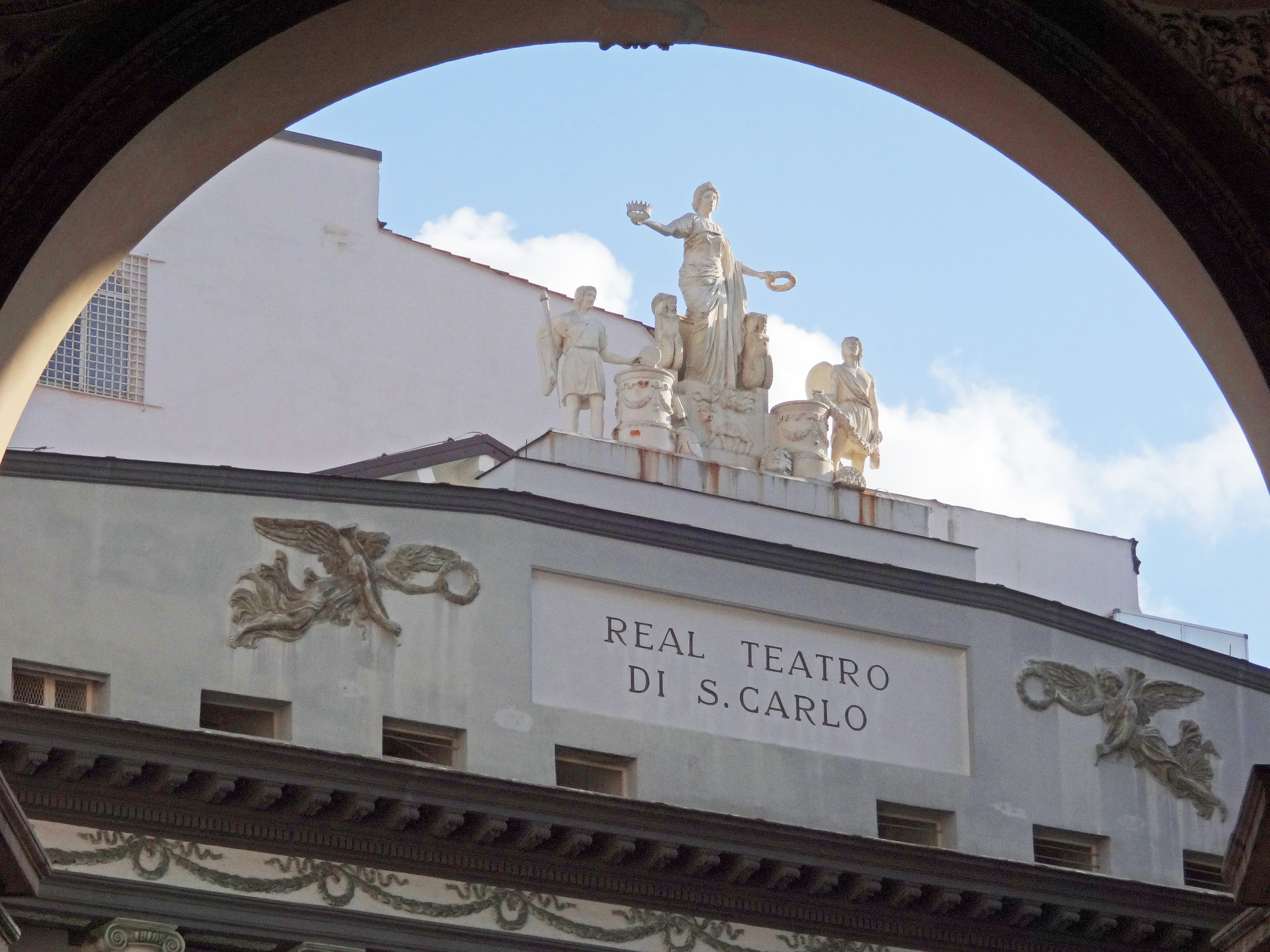
Top floor of the Teatro di San Carlo

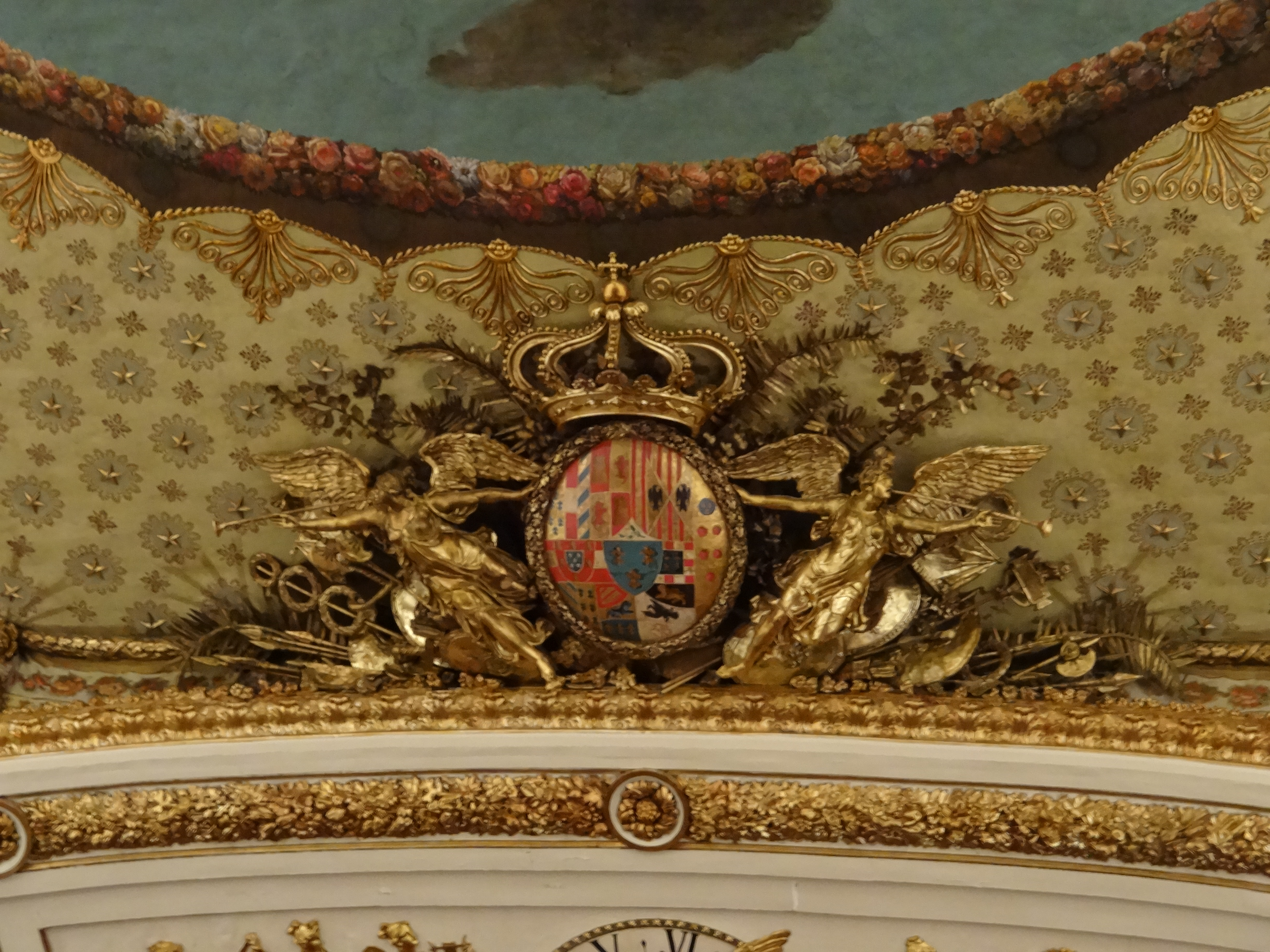
Royal coat of arms above proscenium

The Real Teatro di San Carlo was commissioned by the Bourbon King Charles VII of Naples (Carlo VII in Italian), who wanted to endow Naples with a new and larger theatre to replace the old, dilapidated, and too-small Teatro San Bartolomeo of 1621, which had served the city well, especially after Scarlatti had moved there in 1682 and had begun to create an important opera centre which existed well into the 18th century.

Thus, the San Carlo was inaugurated on 4 November 1737, the king's name day, with the performance of the opera Domenico Sarro's Achille in Sciro, based on the 1736 libretto by Metastasio which had been set to music that year by Antonio Caldara. As was customary, the role of Achilles was played by a woman, Vittoria Tesi, called "Moretta"; the opera also featured soprano Anna Peruzzi, called "the Parrucchierina" and tenor Angelo Amorevoli. Sarro also conducted the orchestra in two ballets as intermezzi, created by Gaetano Grossatesta, with scenes designed by Pietro Righini. The first seasons highlighted the royal preference for dance numbers, and featured among the performers famous castrati.

In the late 18th century, Christoph Willibald Gluck was called to Naples by the impresario Tufarelli to direct his 1752 Clemenza di Tito at the theatre, and Johann Christian Bach in 1761–62 brought two operas, Catone in Utica and Alessandro nell'Indie.

=== 1737: Construction of the Teatro di San Carlo (San Carlo Theater) ===
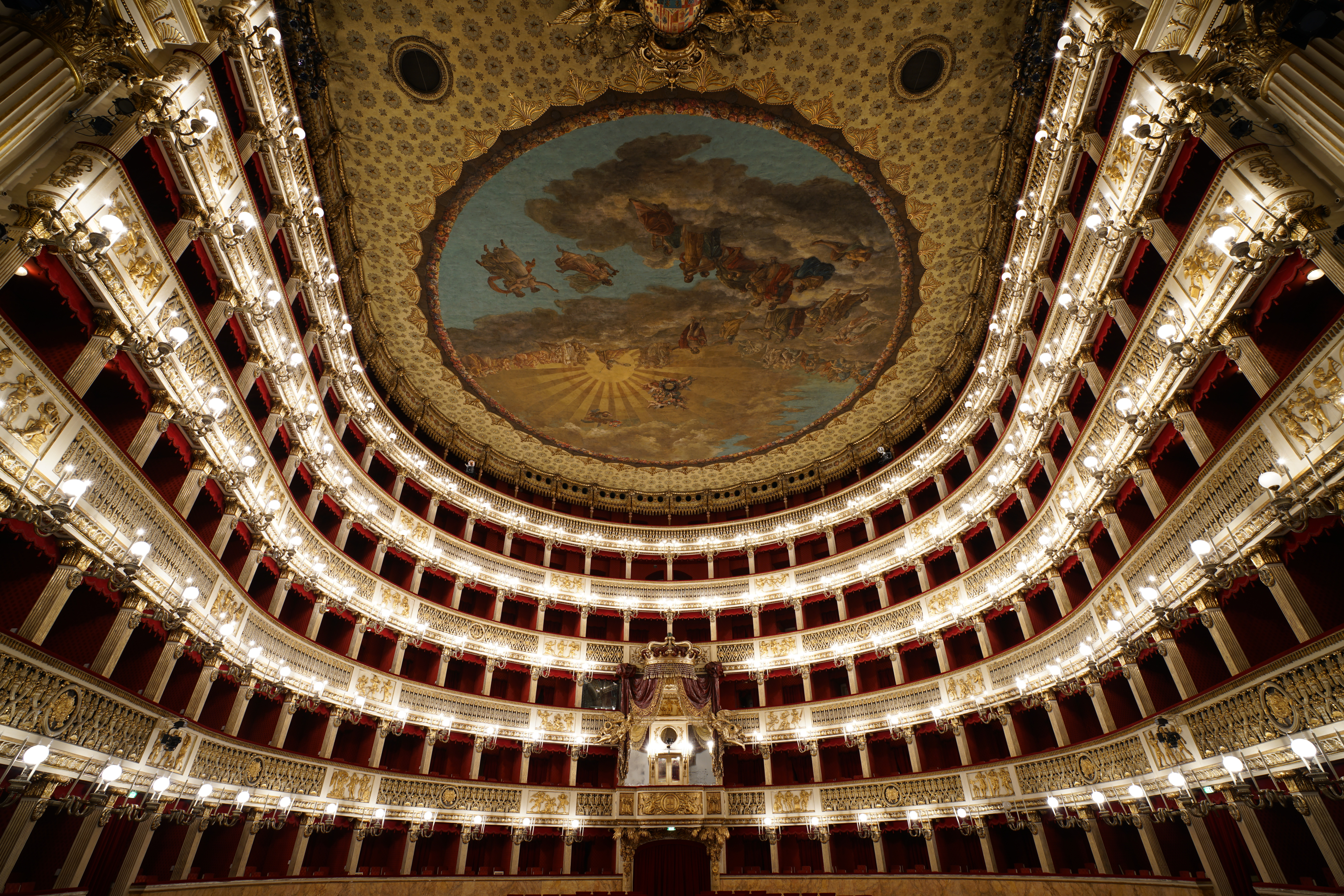
Interior view on to the royal box

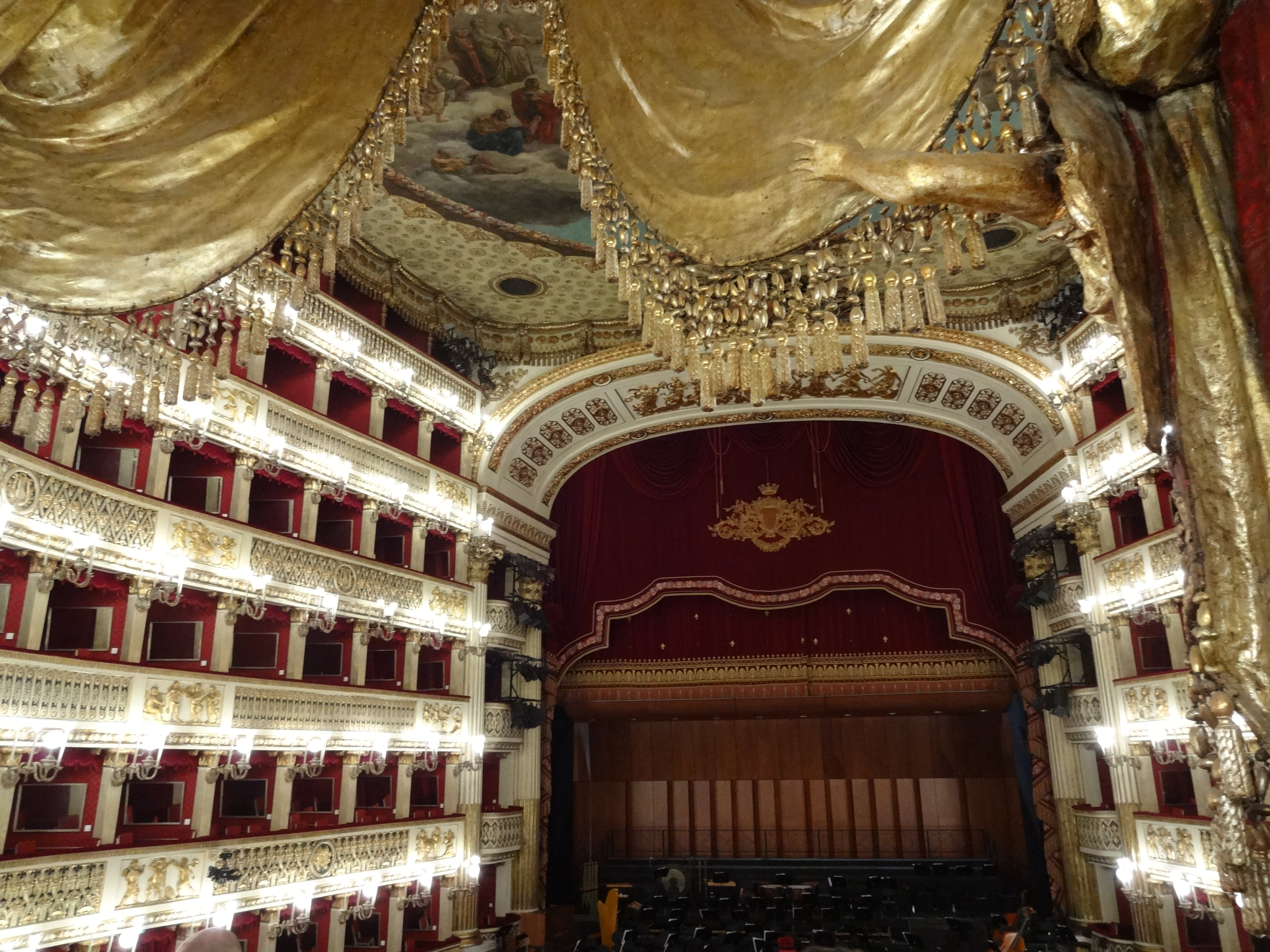
View from the royal box

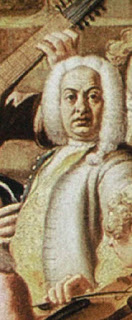
Domenico Sarro, composer of Achille in Sciro, the opera that was chosen to open the new Teatro di San Carlo in 1737.

The Teatro di San Carlo (San Carlo Theater) was designed by Giovanni Antonio de Medrano, a Sicilian nobleman, royal architect and chief engineer of the kingdom, who also served as Major Regius Praefectus Mathematicis Regni Neapolitani (Major Royal Governor of Mathematics of the Kingdom of Naples) and was a teacher of Charles III of Spain. Angelo Carasale, the former director of the San Bartolomeo, was primarily responsible for designing the elaborate furnishings of the Teatro di San Carlo. The horseshoe-shaped auditorium is the oldest in the world. It was built for 75,000 ducats. The hall was 28.6 meters long and 22.5 meters wide, with 184 boxes, including those of proscenium, arranged in six orders, plus a royal box capable of accommodating ten people, for a total of 1,379 seats. Including a standing room, the theatre could hold over 3,000 people. The fastidious composer and violinist Louis Spohr reviewed the size and acoustic properties of this opera house very thoroughly on 15 February 1817 and concluded that:

there is no better place for ballet and pantomime. Military movements of infantry and cavalry, battles, and storms at sea can be represented here without falling into the ludicrous. But for opera, itself, the house is too large. Although the singers, Signora Isabella Colbran, [Prima Donna of the Teatro San Carlo opera company and Rossini's future wife], and the Signori Nozzari, Benedetti, etc., have very strong voices, only their highest and most stentorian tones could be heard. Any kind of tender utterance was lost.

Much admired for its architecture, its gold decorations, and the sumptuous blue upholstery (blue and gold being the official colours of the Bourbons), the San Carlo was now the biggest opera house in the world. Concerning the power of the existing Bourbon Kingdom of the Two Sicilies, Beauvert notes that the design of the house, with its 184 boxes lacking any curtains was so that "no one could avoid the scrutiny by the sovereign" who had his private access from the Royal Palace.

In 1809, Domenico Barbaia was appointed manager of the royal opera houses in Naples and remained in charge until 1841. He soon established a reputation for innovative and dazzling productions, attracting the public and leading singers to the opera house.

=== February 1816 to January 1817: Destruction by fire and rebuilding ===
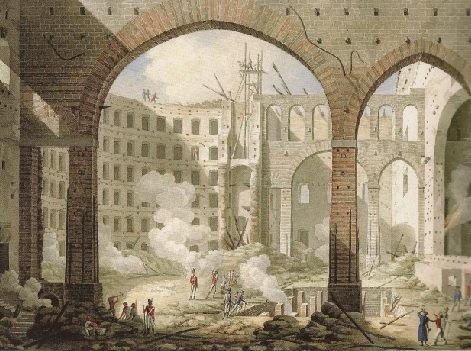
Teatro San Carlo, Naples after the 13 Feb 1816 fire

On 13 February 1816, a fire broke out during a dress rehearsal for a ballet performance and quickly spread to destroy a part of the building.

On the orders of King Ferdinand IV, another Bourbon monarch and son of Charles VII, who used the services of Antonio Niccolini, Barbaia was able to rebuild the opera house within ten months. It was rebuilt as a traditional horseshoe-shaped auditorium with 1,444 seats and a proscenium, 33.5m wide and 30m high. The stage was 34.5m deep. Niccolini embellished in the inner of the bas-relief depicting "Time and the Hour".

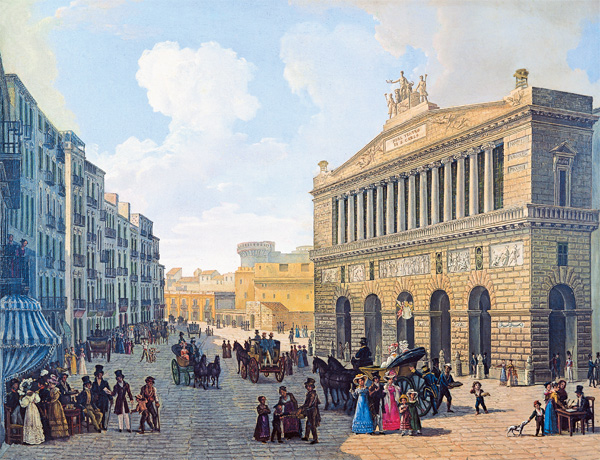
Teatro San Carlo in 1830

The central frescoed ceiling painting of Apollo presenting to Minerva the greatest poets of the world was painted by Antonio, Giuseppe e Giovanni Cammarano.

On 12 January 1817, the rebuilt theatre was inaugurated with Johann Simon Mayr's Il sogno di Partenope. Stendhal attended the second night of the inauguration and wrote: "There is nothing in all Europe, I won't say comparable to this theatre, but which gives the slightest idea of what it is like..., it dazzles the eyes, it enraptures the soul...".

In 1844, the opera house was re-decorated under Niccolini, his son Fausto, and Francesco Maria dei Giudice. The main result was the change in appearance of the interior to the now-traditional red and gold.

=== Late 19th century, post World War II, and 21st century renovations ===
Apart from the creation of the orchestra pit, suggested by Verdi in 1872, the installation of electricity in 1890, the subsequent abolition of the central chandelier, and the construction of the new foyer and a new wing for dressing rooms, the theatre underwent no substantial changes until the repair of the bombing damage in 1943.

During World War II, the opera house was damaged by bombs. Following the liberation of Naples in October 1943, Peter Francis of the Royal Artillery organized repairs to the damaged foyer and, three weeks later, reopened the building with a musical revue. With the building in a fit state for performances, more musicians and singers made themselves available, and the first opera performance was held on 26 December 1943, a matinee presentation of Puccini's La bohème. Francis stayed on for another two years, producing 30 operas. On 9 July 1946, the American baritone Lawrence Tibbett sang the title role in Rigoletto before an audience that included senior military figures of the Mediterranean Theater of Operations and troops of the Allied Forces.

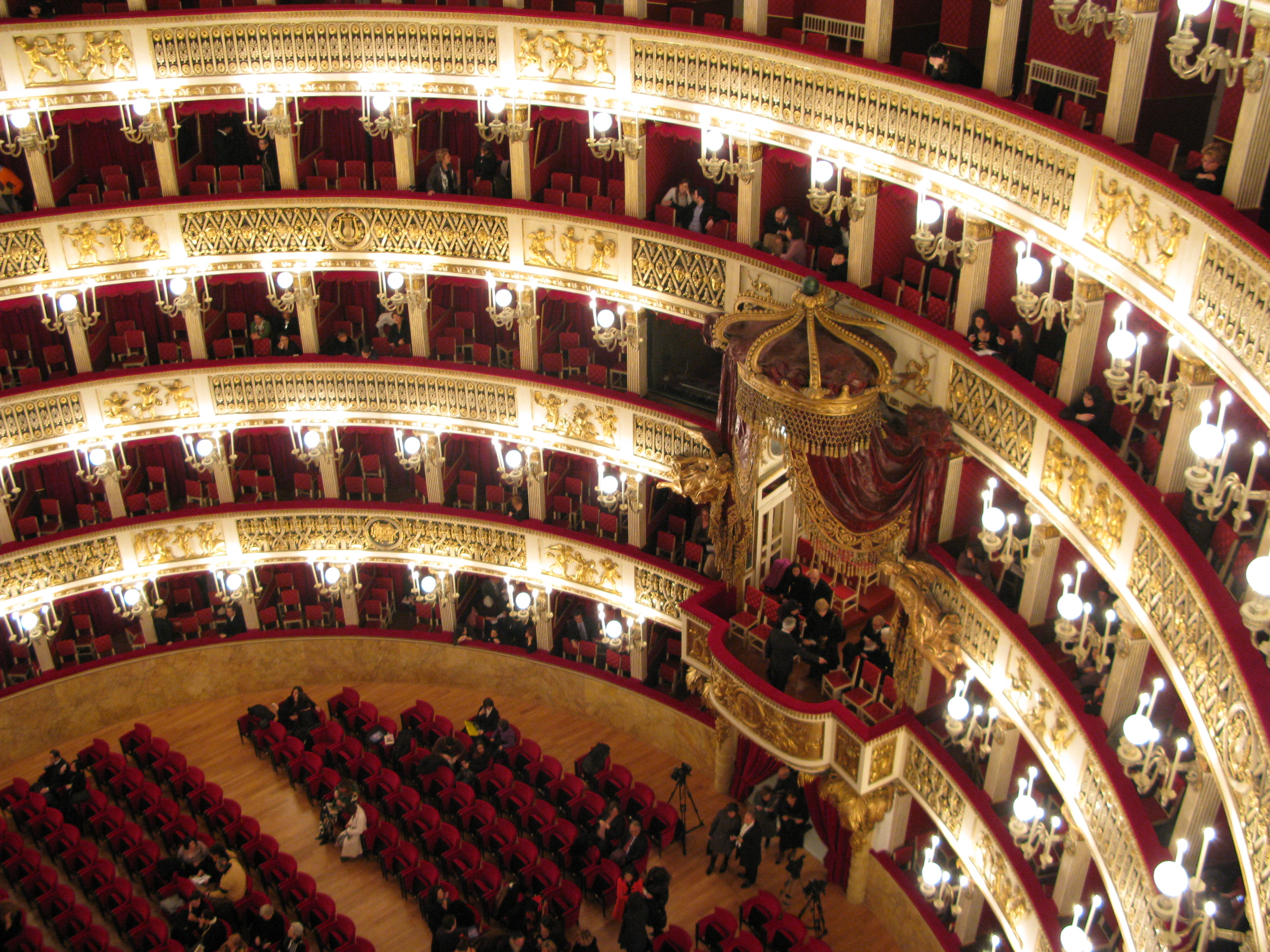
The renovated auditorium in 2009

By the start of the twenty-first century, the opera house was showing its age with outmoded stage machinery, inadequate visitor facilities, and lack of air conditioning. In response, the Campania regional government funded a €67 million renovation over six months in 2008 and six months in 2009, including restoration of the décor and the creation of a new rehearsal hall. As noted in Gramophone magazine, the opera house reopened on 27 January 2010 with Mozart's La Clemenza di Tito, the 254th anniversary of the composer's birth: "The renovation work was completed last year under the direction of architect Elisabetta Fabbri and is intended to return Teatro San Carlo to its condition following Antonio Niccolini's rebuilding after the fire of 1816. The project....involved 300 workers day and night."

== The great age of Neapolitan opera ==
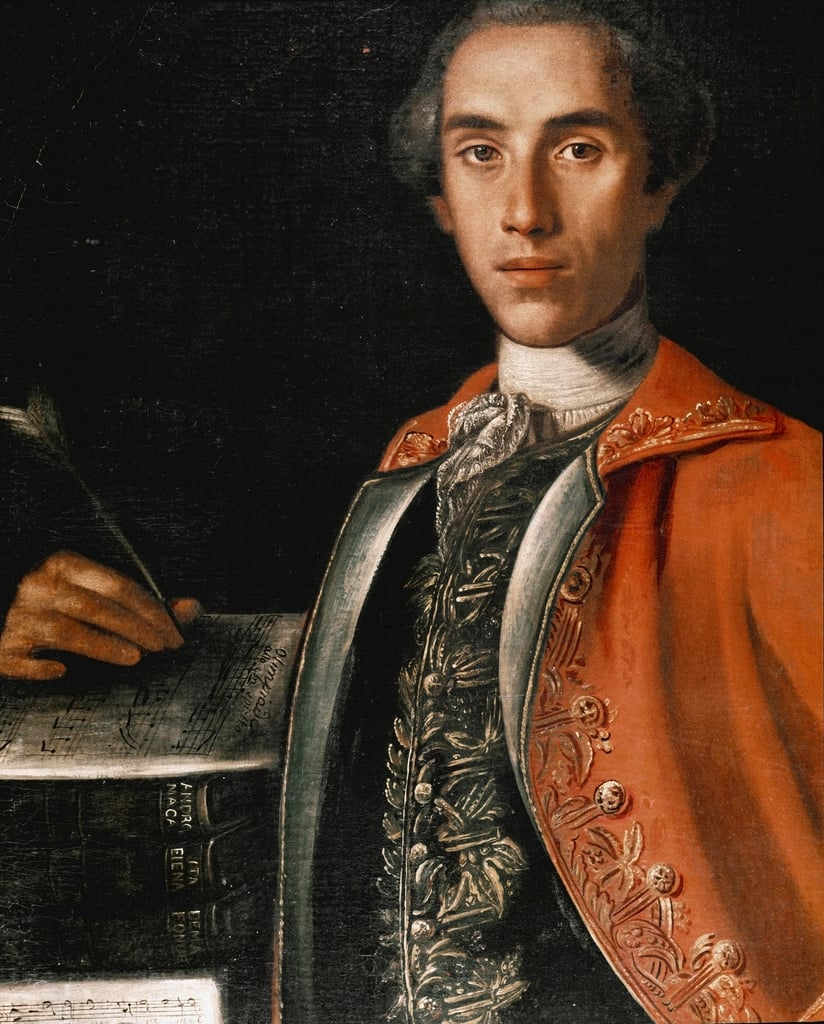
Leonardo Leo

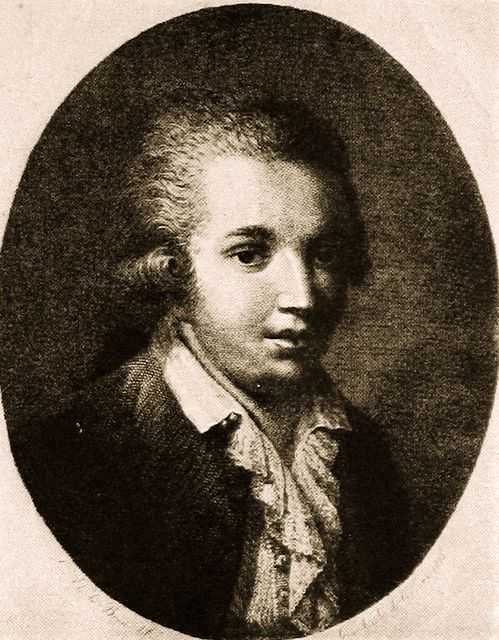
Domenico Cimarosa

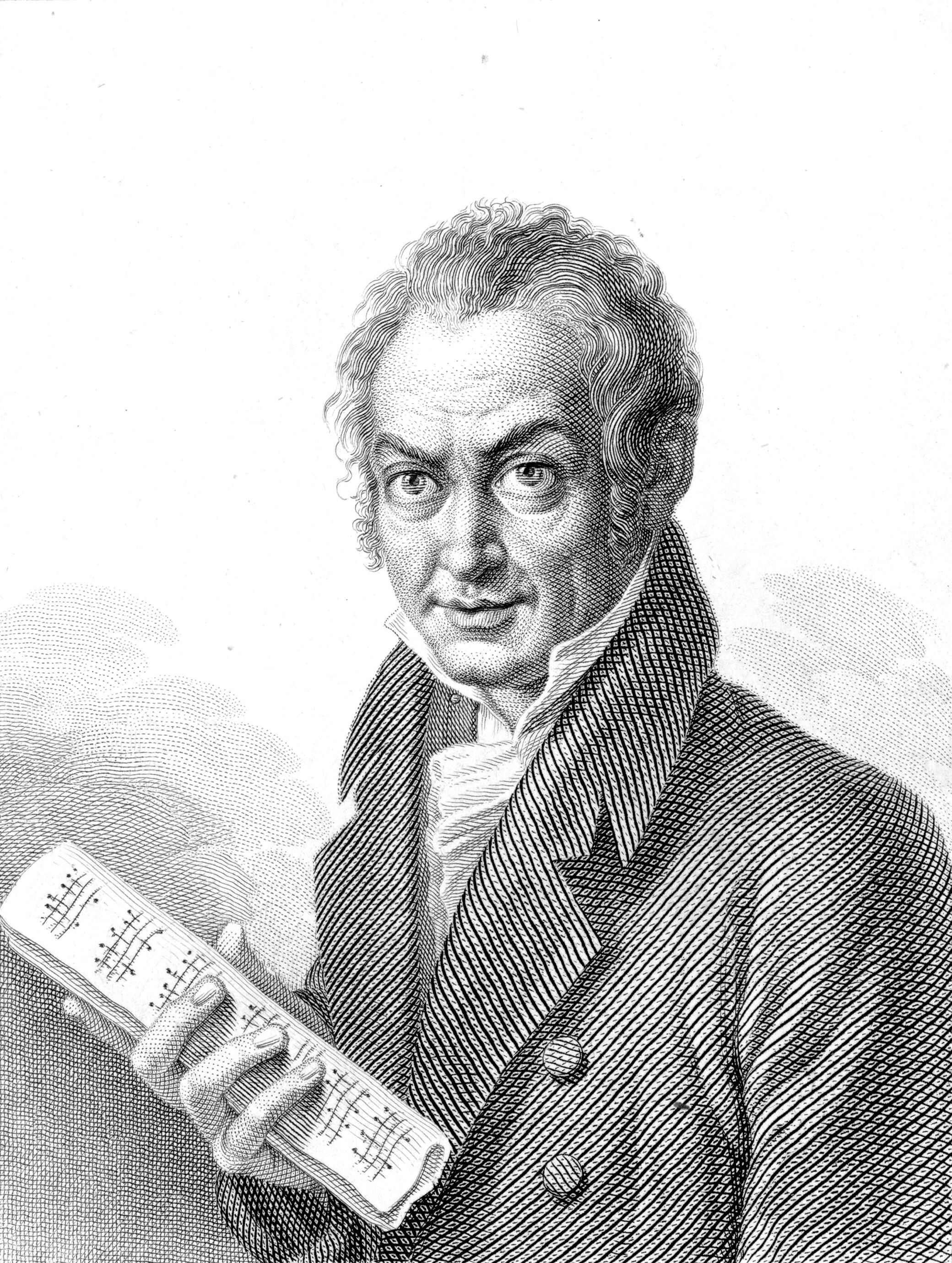
Niccolò Antonio Zingarelli

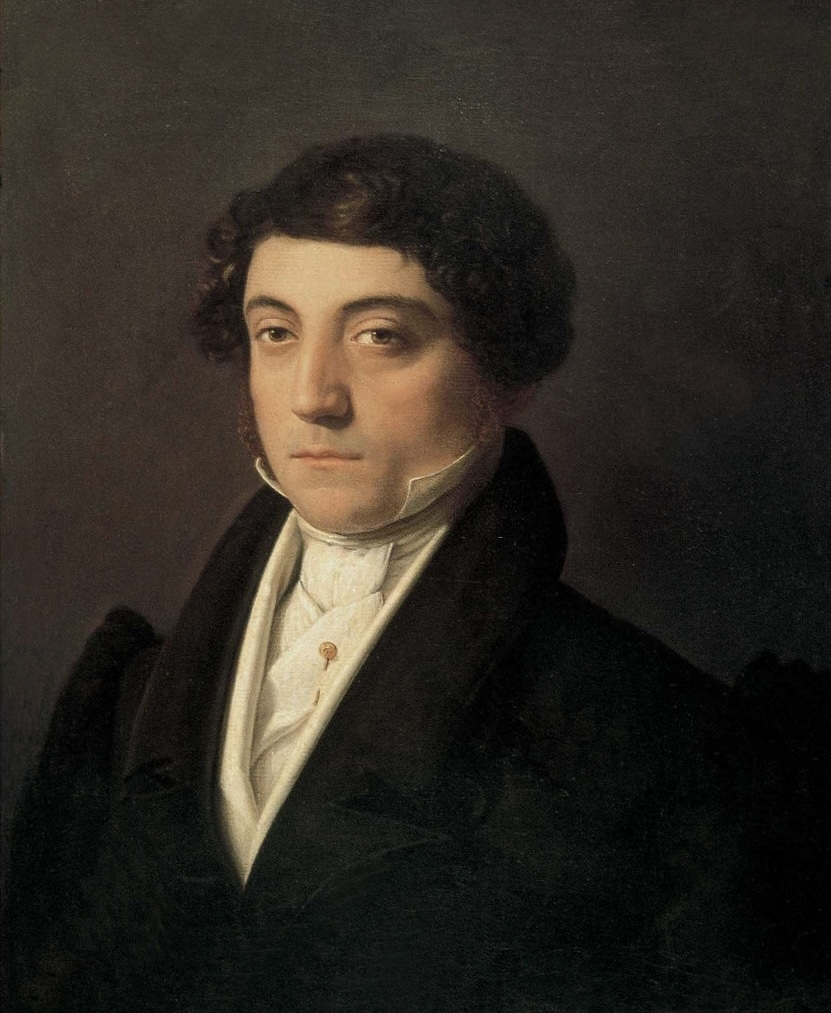
Gioachino Rossini, 1815

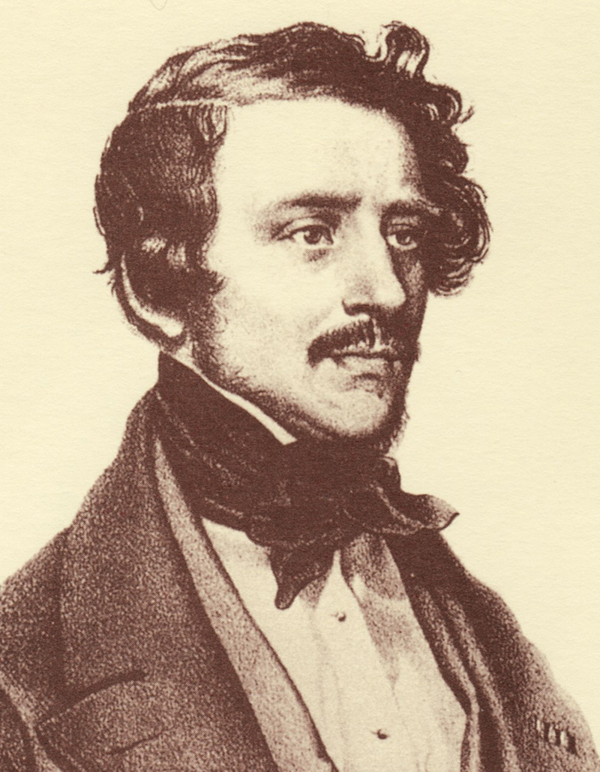
Gaetano Donizetti, 1842

At the time, Neapolitan School of opera enjoyed great success all over Europe, not only in the field of opera buffa but also in that of opera seria. The Neapolitan school of opera composers included Feo, Porpora, Leo, Traetta, Piccinni, Vinci, Anfossi, Durante, Jommelli, Cimarosa, Paisiello, Zingarelli, and Gazzaniga. Naples became the capital of European music, and even foreign composers considered the performance of their compositions at the San Carlo theatre to be the goal of their careers. These composers included Hasse (who later settled in Naples) Haydn, Johann Christian Bach and Gluck.

Similarly, the most prominent singers performed and consolidated their fame at the San Carlo. These included Lucrezia Anguiari, called "La Cocchetta", the renowned castrati Giovanni Manzuoli, Caffarelli (Gaetano Majorano), Farinelli (Carlo Broschi), Gizziello (Gioacchino Conti) and Gian Battista Velluti, the last castrato. Caffarelli, Farinelli, and Gizziello were products of the local conservatories of Naples.

=== Composers in residence ===
From 1815 to 1822, Gioachino Rossini was house composer and artistic director of the royal opera houses, including the San Carlo. During this period he wrote ten operas which were Elisabetta, regina d'Inghilterra (1815), La gazzetta, Otello, ossia il Moro di Venezia (1816), Armida (1817), Mosè in Egitto, Ricciardo e Zoraide (1818), Ermione, Bianca e Falliero, Eduardo e Cristina, La donna del lago (1819), Maometto II (1820), and Zelmira (1822).

Regular singers of the period included Manuel Garcia and his daughter Maria Malibran, Clorinda Corradi, Giuditta Pasta, Isabella Colbran, Giovanni Battista Rubini, Domenico Donzelli and the two great French rivals Adolphe Nourrit and Gilbert Duprez—the inventor of the C from the chest.

After composing Zelmira, Rossini left Naples with Colbran, who had previously been the lover of Domenico Barbaia. The couple were married shortly thereafter.

To replace Rossini, Barbaja first signed up Giovanni Pacini and then another rising star of Italian opera, Gaetano Donizetti. As artistic director of the royal opera houses, Donizetti remained in Naples from 1822 until 1838, composing sixteen operas for the theatre, among which Maria Stuarda (1834), Roberto Devereux (1837), Poliuto (1838) and the famous Lucia di Lammermoor (1835), written for soprano Tacchinardi-Persiani and tenor Duprez.

Vincenzo Bellini, Sicilian by birth, also staged his first work, Bianca e Fernando, at the San Carlo.

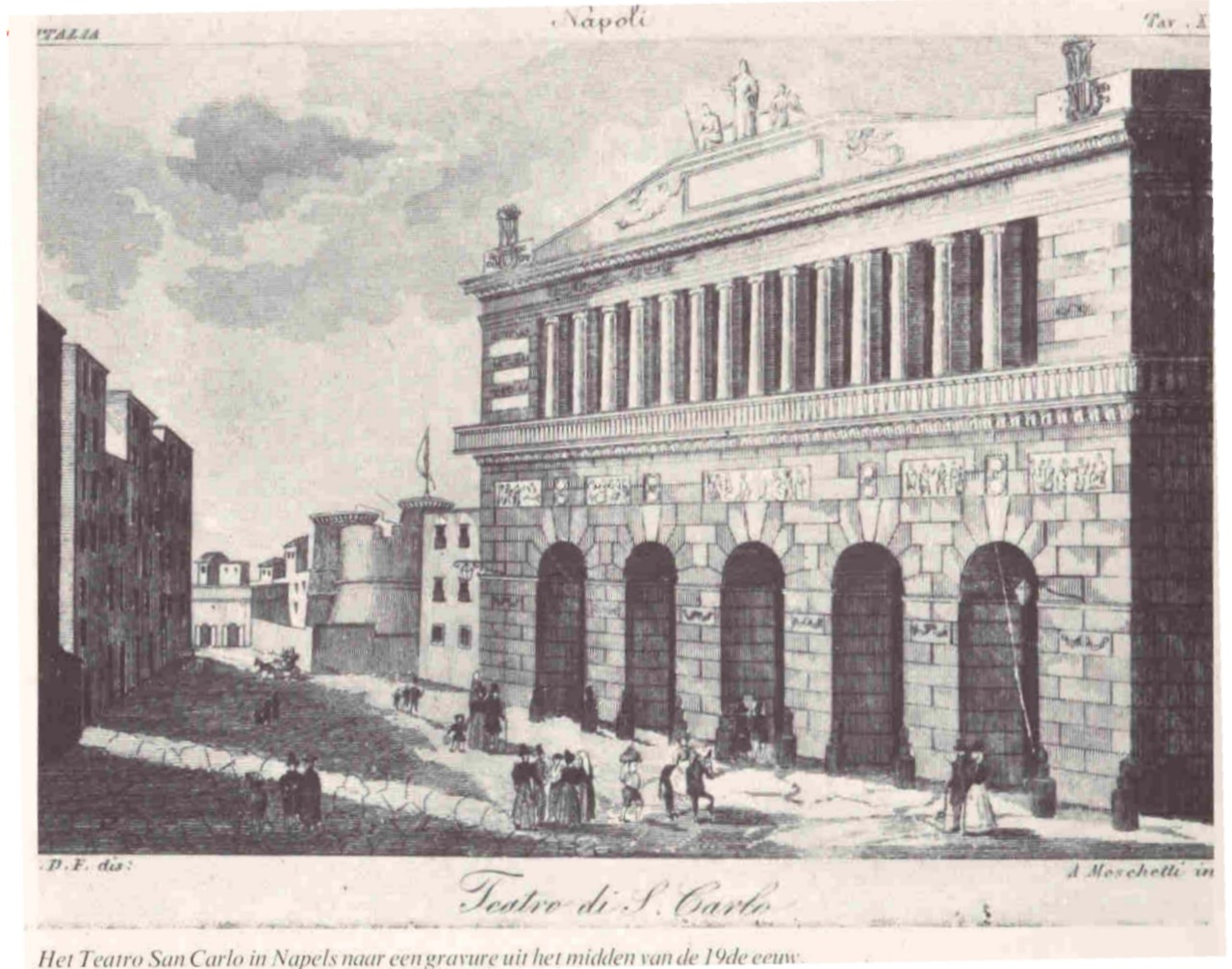
Exterior view of the theatre around 1850

Giuseppe Verdi was also associated with the theatre. In 1841, his Oberto Conte di San Bonifacio was performed there, and in 1845 he wrote his first opera for the theatre, Alzira; a second, Luisa Miller, followed in 1849. His third should have been Gustavo III, but the censor made such significant changes that it was never performed in that version nor under that title (until a re-created version was given in 2004). It was later performed in Rome with significant revisions to the plot and its location, while the title became Un ballo in maschera.

Among the conductors and composers appointed by the Teatro San Carlo was the famous and eccentric French harpist and composer Nicolas-Charles Bochsa, who was accompanied by his lover, the English prima donna Anna Bishop, with whom he was touring the world. He conducted several operas (1844–1845) in the San Carlo with Anna Bishop as prima donna. She sang there 327 times in 24 operas.

== Decline and revival by late 19th century ==
The unification of Italy in 1861 led to Naples losing its status as the musical center of Italy and the home of the country's leading opera house (Milan and the Teatro alla Scala took up these positions as power and wealth moved northwards). By 1874, the fall in performance income led to the opera house's closing for a year. Its fortunes were able to recover due to the continued support in the latter half of the nineteenth century and into the twentieth century by Giacomo Puccini and other composers of verismo operas, such as Pietro Mascagni, Leoncavallo, Giordano, and Cilea, who staged their works here.

In the late nineteenth century, the house created its own in-house orchestra under Giuseppe Martucci, which helped attract several respected conductors, including Arturo Toscanini, Pietro Mascagni, and composer Richard Strauss, whose influence expanded the opera house's repertoire.

One performer who did not appear in Naples from 1901 onward was Naples-born Enrico Caruso, who, after being booed by a section of the audience during a performance of L'elisir d'amore, vowed never to return.

== Conductors ==
Principal conductors

- Elio Boncompagni (1979–1982)
- Salvatore Accardo (1993–1995)
- Gabriele Ferro (1999–2004)
- Gary Bertini (2004–2005)
- Jeffrey Tate (2005–2010)
- Nicola Luisotti (2012–2014)
- Juraj Valčuha (2016–2022)
- Dan Ettinger (2023–present)

Principal guest conductor

- Maurizio Benini (2010–2011)

Honorary conductor

- Zubin Mehta (2016–present)

== See also ==
- Music of Naples
