= Matteuccio =

Italian castrato and soprano

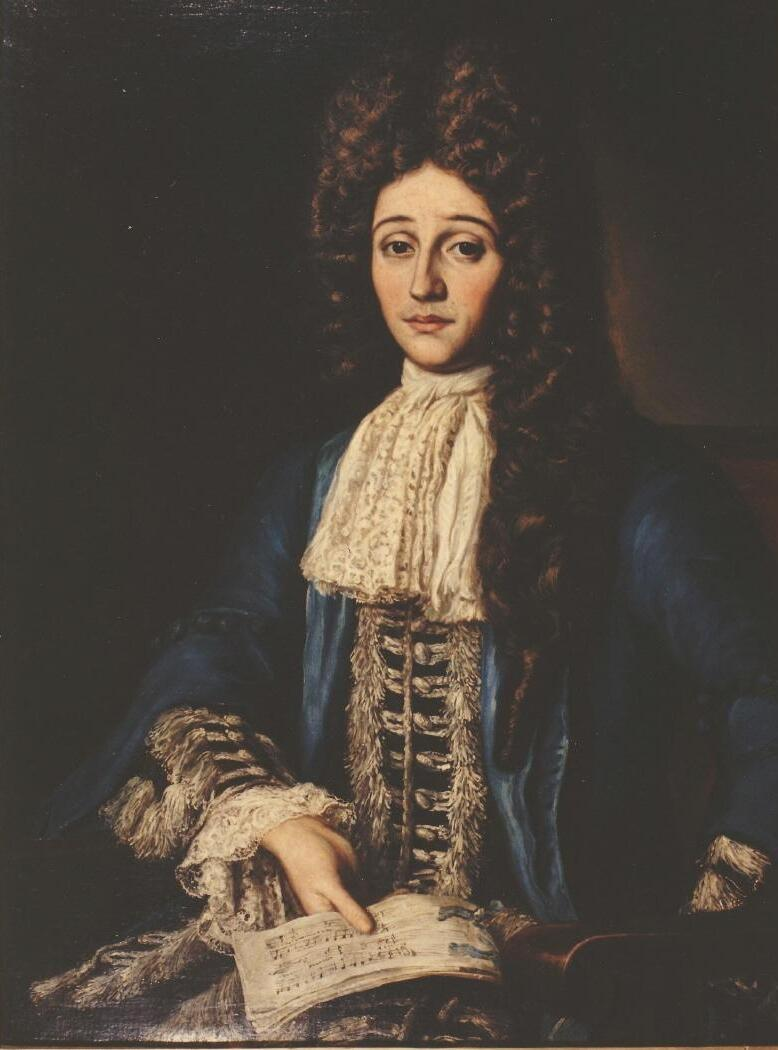
Matteo Sassano, pseudonym Matteuccio, around 1700. Anonymus, oil on wood, 100 × 76 cm, Madrid, Museo Nacional de Artes Decorativas

Matteo Sassano, called Matteuccio (1667 - 15 October 1737), was a famous Italian castrato, also called "the nightingale of Naples" (il rosignuolo di Napoli) because of his extremely beautiful soprano voice and virtuoso singing.

== Life ==
=== Childhood and youth ===
Born in San Severo, Kingdom of Naples, Sassano was the son of the widow Livia Tommasino and Giuseppe Sassano. Nothing is known about his early childhood. A barber from his hometown, who presumably performed the fateful orchiectomy procedure, had contacts in Naples with one Alessandro de Liguoro, a barber with a shop near the palazzo of the Apostolic Nuncio on Via Toledo; the latter picked up little Matteo, took him in, looked after him and subsequently became a confidant for the singer. Alessandro also ensured that the nine-year-old Matteo could enter the Conservatorio dei Poveri di Gesù Cristo. There, for the next 10 years, he received perfect musical and vocal training under the direction of Giovanni Salvatore and Donato Oliva.

After an initial period of training, Matteo was able to take part in the Conservatorio's customary servizio di musica (music "service"): This meant that he was sent to sing in the surrounding churches on important feast days. In 1684, while still a student at the Conservatorio, he took up employment in the Chapel of the Royal Palace of Naples, with a salary of 10 ducats a month.

He was now known by his cose and stage name "Matteuccio" (little Matteo) and subsequently appeared mainly in various operas and serenatas by the important opera composer Alessandro Scarlatti who worked in Naples: Probably for the first time in 1684 as part of a private performance in the house of the House of Carafa in the opera Dal male il bene (orig. Tutto il mal non vien per nuocere) to a libretto by Giuseppe Domenico de Todis. On 25 August and 16 September 1686, he took part in Scarlatti's serenata L'Olimpo in Mergellina at the Palazzo Reale; it was a mammoth performance with about 100 performers.

In 1690, he was officially appointed soprano of the important Cappella del Tesoro di S. Gennaro, and admitted as a member of the Congregazione de' Musici of Naples. The latter was a brotherhood reserved exclusively for members of the Royal Chapel and had its seat in the church of Montesanto. In 1694, Matteuccio was appointed head of the Congregazione.

In the meantime, his poor mother also lived with him in Naples; Matteo put his flat at her disposal, he himself lodged in the convent of S. Francesco de Paola near the royal palace. Unfortunately, scandal soon threatened when his mother began seeing other men every week. Matteo found a solution by marrying her off in 1694 to his former mentor, the barber Alessandro de Liguoro, who was able to open a new and nicer shop directly opposite the nunciature from the rich dowry of 282 ducats.

Matteuccio's fame as a singer had meanwhile grown to such an extent that in 1695 a first call from the music-loving Emperor Leopold I reached him from Vienna. The singer set off on his journey on 18 April 1695, but turned back halfway, officially for health reasons, in reality possibly because he was afraid of the cool climate on the other side of the Alps, and because he had no desire to leave his native Naples. Nevertheless, in November of the same year he travelled to Vienna after all, and although he received a salary of 3,000 Scudi earned, he stayed only until the summer of 1696.

By 13 July 1696, Matteuccio was back in Naples, and by 15 July he was already singing during fabulous festivities for the opening of the seafront promenade at the Casino of the viceroy in Posillipo the Adonis in Alessandro Scarlatti's serenata Venere, Adone et Amore (i.e. Dal giardin del piacere; libretto: Francesco Maria Paglia).

Unfortunately, Matteuccio's success did not have only positive sides. After his return from the imperial court, he began to change: He was now a divo, idolised by women and highly paid, behaving proudly and haughtily, and even refusing to obey the Viceroy of Naples on one occasion. However, because of his wonderful singing, his airs were always forgiven.

In 1697, he followed this with the title role in the opera L'Ajace by Carlo Ambrogio Lonati and Paolo Magni, which, however, had been heavily revised for this performance by Francesco Gasparini. At the Teatro San Bartolomeo on 15 December 1697, he sang the role of Appio Claudio in Alessandro Scarlatti's La caduta de' decemviri (libretto by Silvio Stampiglia), and in the 1698 carnival, the role of Laerte Porsenna in Il Muzio Scevola with music by Cavalli and Giovanni Bononcini, in a revision by A. Scarlatti (libretto again by Silvio Stampiglia).

In 1697 and 1698, Matteuccio also made several appearances in northern Italy, singing at the Teatro Ducale in Piacenza in Bernardo Sabadini's La virtù trionfante dell' inganno, and in Giovanni Bononcini's successful opera Il trionfo di Camilla also in Reggio nell'Emilia in Carlo Francesco Pollarolo's L'Ulisse sconosciuto in Itaca.

=== In Madrid and Vienna ===
In 1698, Matteuccio was summoned to Madrid by the Spanish Queen Maria Anna of Neuburg. She hoped that his singing could have a healing effect on the severe depression of King Charles II of Spain. "The Nightingale of Naples" therefore had to sing for the king every evening, and he actually felt so much better that the singer remained at the Spanish court until Charles' death in 1700. Decades later, this positive experience was a model for the Spanish queen Isabella Farnese, when she invited the famous Farinelli to sing for her husband, the depressed Philip V of Spain.

After the death of Charles II, Matteuccio went back to Vienna in 1701, where he contributed to the joy of Joseph I, Holy Roman Emperor and the imperial court over the next few years.

From Vienna, he travelled to Venice at the end of 1705 to perform at the Teatro San Giovanni Grisostomo in the premieres of Carlo Francesco Pollarolo's operas Flavio Bertarido, re de' Longobardi, and Filippo, re della Grecia (from January 1706). When he sang the part of Lucia in the oratorio La costanza trionfante nel martirio di Santa Lucia in Florence in 1705, he "astonished and amazed everyone" with his singing.

In 1708, he appeared in Bologna in the opera Il Venceslao, ossia Il fratricida innocente by Giacomo Antonio Perti. In November of the same year, he was back in Venice, where he sang in Antonio Caldara's Sofonisba and in January 1709 in Il vincitor generoso by Antonio Lotti.

On one of his journeys, Matteuccio met the famous contralto Francesco Antonio Pistocchi in the church of Santissima Annunziata in Florence, with whom he sang a motet by Alessandro Scarlatti. After the performance, he himself received numerous gifts, Scarlatti a golden tabatière, but poor Pistocchi went away empty-handed! Completely embittered, the alto claimed in a letter to his friend Giacomo Perti that the motet as a whole and Matteuccio had not pleased him at all, especially not the connoisseurs, only he himself had been heard by many "with infinite pleasure"...

=== Back in Naples ===
Matteuccio returned to his native Naples in 1709 after years of absence. There, on 28 August 1709, he performed at the celebrations of the birthday of Queen Elizabeth of Spain in A. Scarlatti's Trattenimento musicale in lode della maestà cattolica di Elisabetta Regina delle Spagne. It was a serenata on a text by Giuseppe Papis for four voices and choir. Only a short time later, he sang during the magnificent commemoration of the Vergine dei Sette Dolori in the church of Santa Maria d'Ogni Bene, and received as an extravagant gift from the Duke of Maddaloni a magnificent Carriage complete with horses in gratitude.

In 1711, Sassano was restored to his place as musician of the Royal Chapel of Naples, which he had lost during his time abroad, with the sole obligation of attending the royal festivities.

The now 44-year-old "Divo" began to cut back a little and sang less frequently from now on. Since he had been ennobled by the Emperor, he was now usually called Margrave. Don Matteo Sassano". The last highlights of his brilliant career were:

- On 19 June 1712, the Serenata for the Coronation of Charles VI as King of Hungary or Il Genio Austriaco by Alessandro Scarlatti (text by Papis) at the Palazzo Reale;
- 1714 the "favoletta drammatica" Thetys, for the wedding of Francesco Maria Spinelli, Prince of Scalea, to Dona Rosa Pignatelli. The music for it was by Tommaso Carapella, and apart from Matteuccio (as Peleo) sang Marianna Bulgarelli, gen. "la Romanina" (as Thetys), Giovanna Albertini, gen. "la Reggiana" (as Dori), and Gaetano Borghi (as Proteo);
- In May 1716, Scarlatti's serenata La gloria di primavera was given at the private theatre of Niccolò Gaetani d'Aragona, Duke of Laurenzano, with Matteuccio in the role of Spring (Primavera) and the Margherita, also known from Handel's biography as Summer (Estate).

At this time, Matteuccio sang mainly and frequently at religious ceremonies in honour of the Vergine Addolorata, or when noble ladies entered a convent, or in his capacity as confrere of the Congregazione di S. Carlo. On 4 December 1717, he performed for the name day of the Countess of Daun, Viceroy of Naples, in Leonardo Leo's serenata Diana amante. For the last time, Sassano's name appears in the Gazzetta di Napoli on 21 November 1724 for the celebration of the convent entrance of Emilia Carafa, sister of the Duke of Maddaloni. At Matteo's side sang the rising star of Italian opera, the young Farinelli. He also became Matteuccio's official successor in the Royal Palace Chapel in 1732, but relinquished this post as early as 1735 in favour of the even younger and equally famous soprano Caffarelli.

Matteuccio continued to sing in church every Saturday out of sheer piety even after his actual retirement at the age of over seventy. His voice is said to have been still so fresh, clear and beautiful "... that everyone who heard him but did not see him believed he was a youth in the prime of life".

Matteuccio, the "Nightingale of Naples", died at the age of seventy on 15 October 1737 in his flat near the convent of Rosariello di Palazzo in Naples, and was buried at the Carminiello di Palazzo.

He left a large fortune, but as he had no descendants, he appointed a Dr. Domenico Terminiello as his heir and executor.
