= Farinelli =

Italian castrato singer (1705–1782)

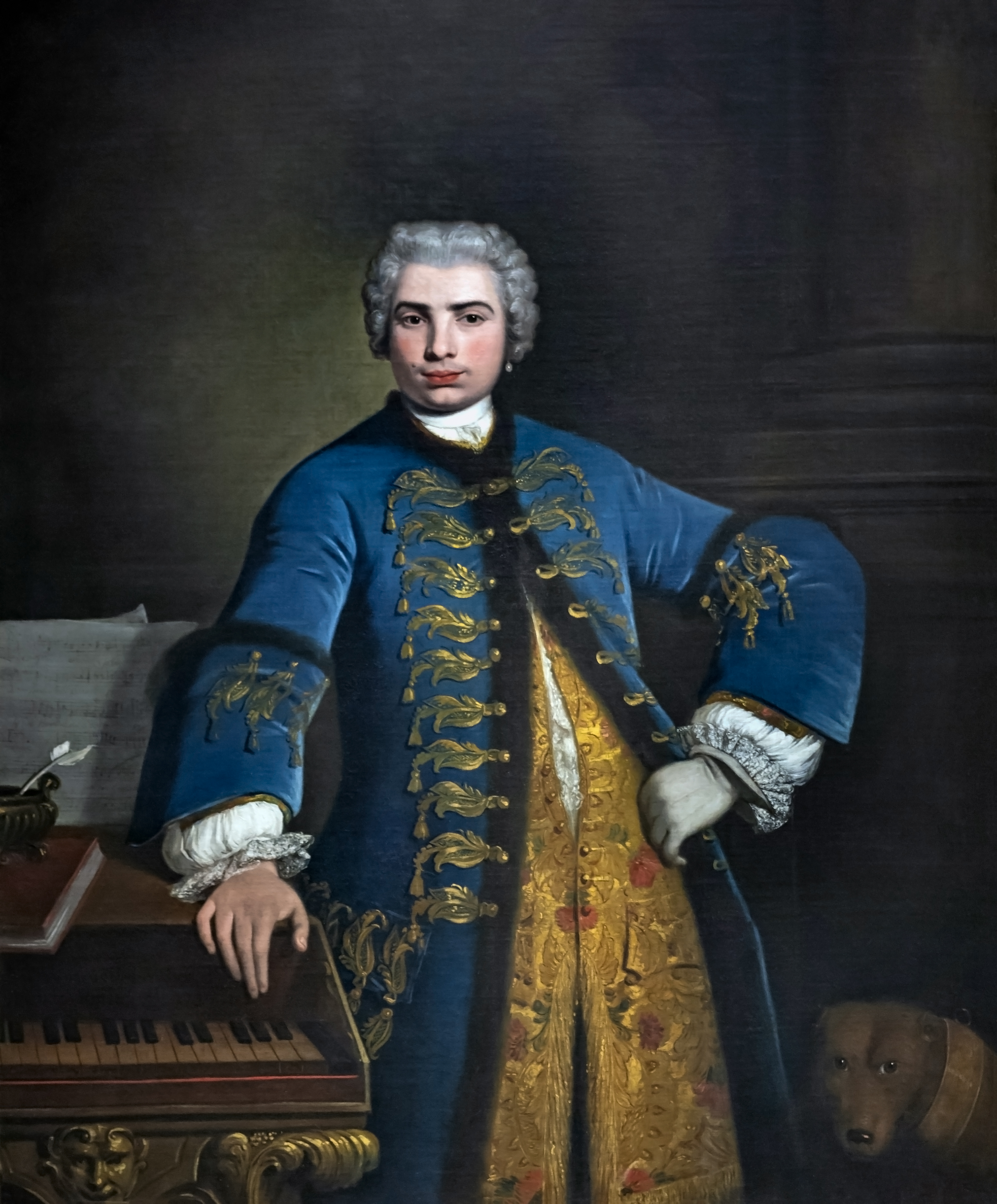
- Portrait of Farinelli by Bartolomeo Nazari (1734)
- Born: Carlo Maria Michelangelo Nicola Broschi; 24 January 1705; Andria, Kingdom of Naples
- Died: 16 September 1782 (aged 77); Bologna, Papal States
- Occupation: Castrato

Carlo Maria Michelangelo Nicola Broschi (Italian: [ˈkarlo ˈbrɔski]), who performed under the stage name Farinelli (Italian: [fariˈnɛlli]; 24 January 1705 – 16 September 1782), (Note: Some older sources say he died on 15 July 1782, but later research has disproved this date.) was an Italian castrato singer, composer, and musician. He was a soprano with a range from approximately F3-D6, and is regarded as one of the greatest singers in the history of opera.

== Early years ==
Broschi was born in Andria (in what is now Apulia, Italy) into a family of musicians. As recorded in the baptismal register of the church of San Nicola in Andria, his father Salvatore Broschi was a composer and maestro di cappella of the Andria Cathedral, and his mother, Caterina Barrese, was a citizen of Naples. The Duke of Andría, Fabrizio Carafa, a member of the House of Carafa, one of the most prestigious families of the Neapolitan nobility, honoured Maestro Broschi by taking a leading part in the baptism of his second son, who was baptised Carlo Maria Michelangelo Nicola. [In later life, Farinelli wrote: "Il Duca d'Andria mi tenne al fonte" ("The Duke of Andria held me at the font")], though this may only have been meant in a figurative sense. In 1706 Salvatore also took up the non-musical post of governor of the town of Maratea (on the western coast of what is now Basilicata), and in 1709 that of Terlizzi (some twenty miles south-east of Andria).

From 1707, the Broschi family lived in the coastal city of Barletta, a few miles from Andria, but at the end of 1711, they made the much longer move to the capital city of Naples, where, in 1712 Carlo's elder brother Riccardo was enrolled at the Conservatory of S. Maria di Loreto, specialising in composition. Carlo had already shown talent as a boy singer, and was now introduced to the most famous singing teacher in Naples, Nicola Porpora. Already a successful opera composer, in 1715 Porpora was appointed maestro at the Conservatory of S. Onofrio, where his pupils included such well-known castrati as Giuseppe Appiani, Felice Salimbeni, and Gaetano Majorano (known as Caffarelli), as well as distinguished female singers such as Regina Mingotti and Vittoria Tesi; Farinelli may well have studied with him privately.

Salvatore Broschi died unexpectedly on 4 November 1717, aged only 36, and perhaps the consequent loss of economic security for the whole family provoked the decision for Carlo to be castrated. As was often the case, an excuse had to be found for this operation, and in Carlo's case, it was said to have been necessitated by a fall from a horse. It is, however, also possible that he was castrated earlier, since, at the time of his father's death, he was already twelve years old, quite an advanced age for castration.

Under Porpora's tutelage, his singing progressed rapidly, and at the age of fifteen, he made his debut in a serenata by his master entitled Angelica e Medoro. The text of this work was the first by the soon-to-be-famous Pietro Trapassi (known as Metastasio), who became a lifelong friend of the singer. Farinelli remarked that the two of them had made their debuts on the same day, and each frequently referred to the other as his caro gemello ("dear twin").

In this Serenata "Angelica e Medoro", the two leading roles were entrusted to two highly acclaimed singers: Marianna Benti Bulgarelli (aka "la Romanina") and Domenico Gizzi, Soprano castrato at the Royal Chapel of Naples.

The derivation of Broschi's stage name is not certain, but it was possibly from two rich Neapolitan lawyers, the brothers Farina, who may have sponsored his studies.

Farinelli quickly became famous throughout Italy as il ragazzo ("the boy"). In 1722, he first sang in Rome in Porpora's Flavio Anicio Olibrio, as well as taking the female lead in Sofonisba by Luca Antonio Predieri. (It was common practice for young castrati to appear en travesti). All these appearances were greeted with huge public enthusiasm, and an almost legendary story arose that he had to perform an aria with trumpet obbligato, which evolved into a contest between singer and trumpeter. Farinelli surpassed the trumpet player so much in technique and ornamentation that he "was at last silenced only by the acclamations of the audience" (to quote the music historian Charles Burney). This account, however, cannot be verified, since no surviving work which Farinelli is known to have performed contains an aria for soprano with trumpet obbligato.

== Career in Europe ==
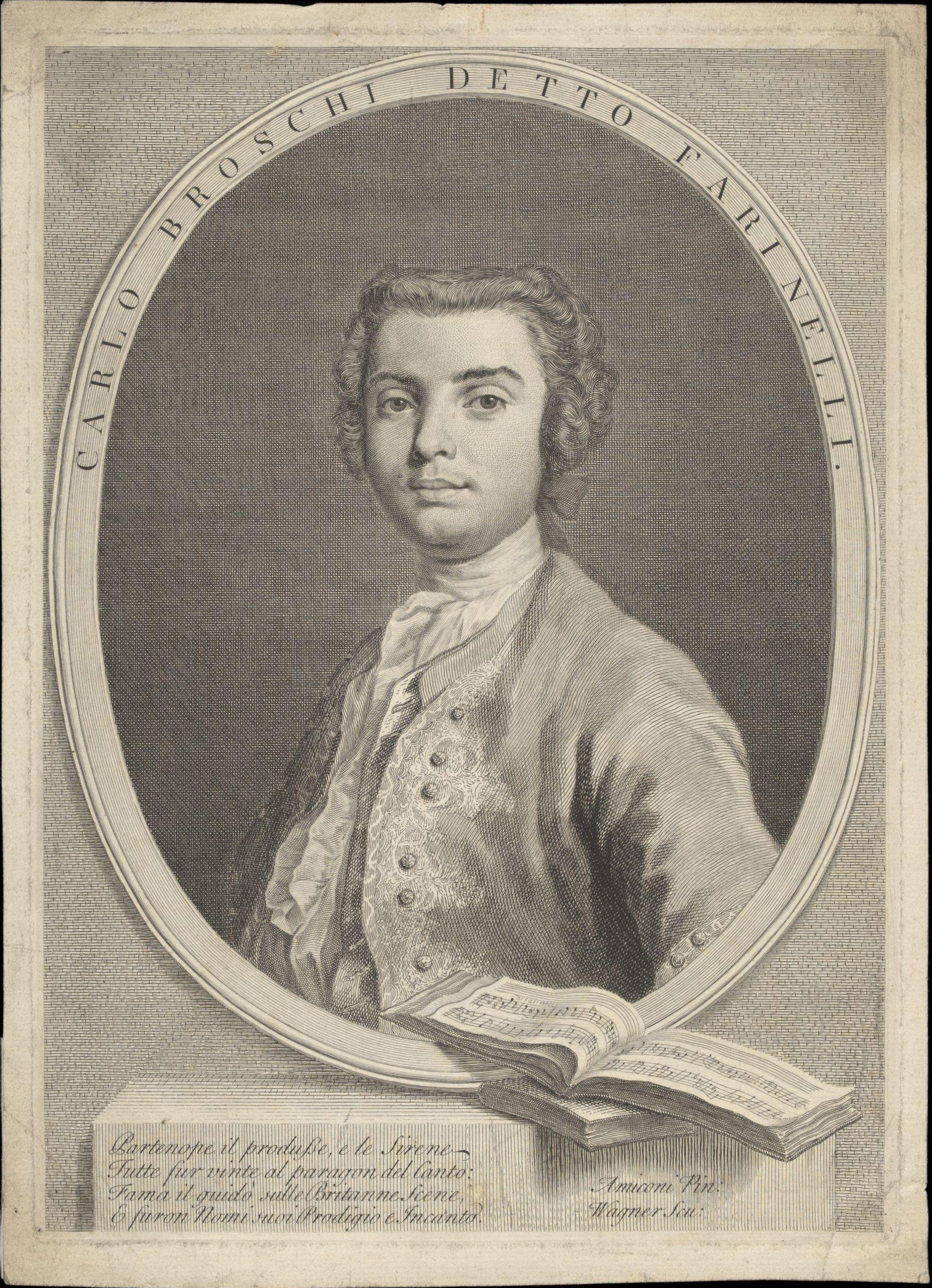
Farinelli, by Wagner after Amigoni 1735

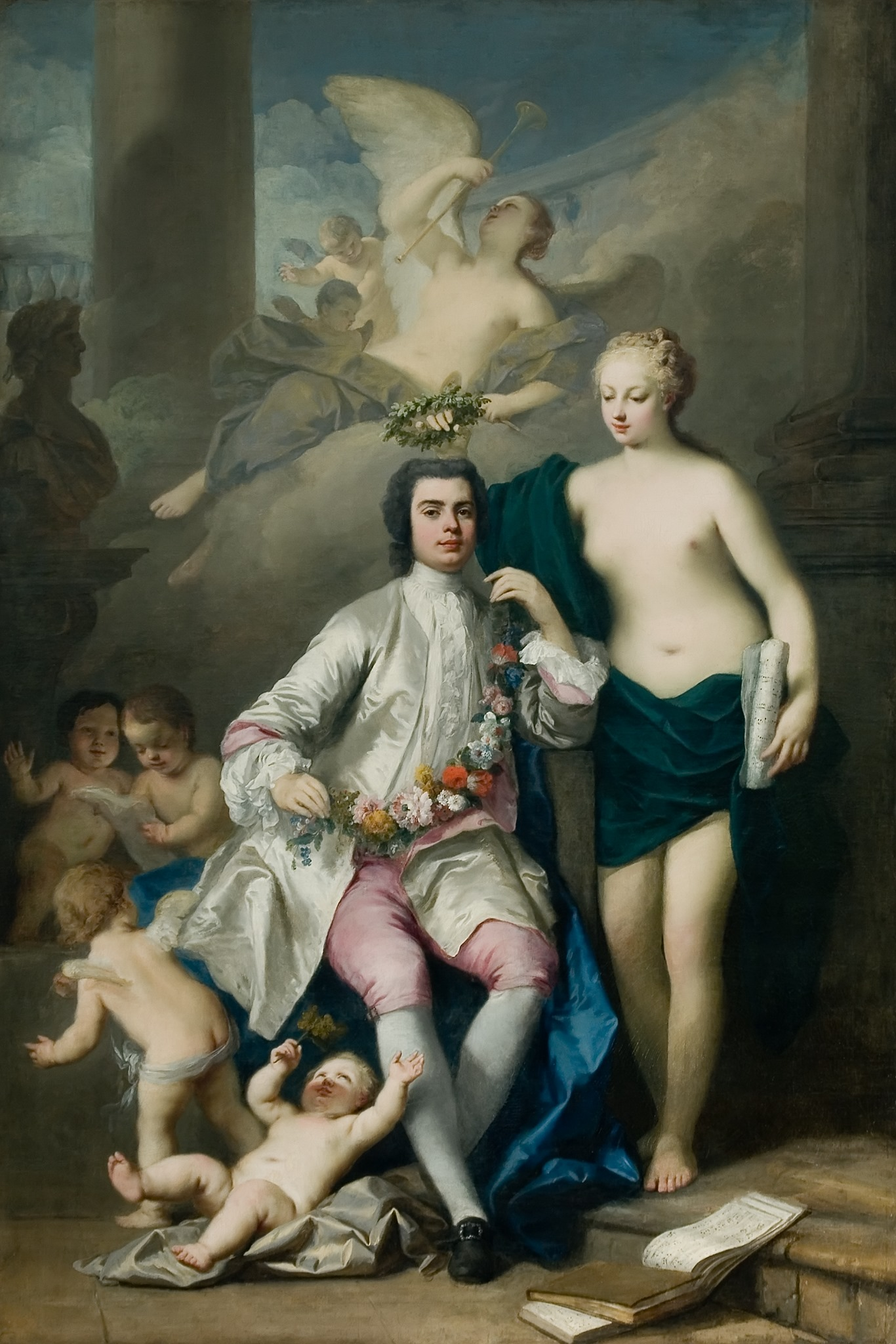
Allegorical portrait of Farinelli by Jacopo Amigoni, showing him being crowned by the Muse of Music.

In 1724, Farinelli made his first appearance in Vienna, at the invitation of Prince Luigi Pio di Savoia, director of the Imperial Theatre. He spent the following season in Naples.

In 1726, Farinelli performed in Parma and Milan, where Johann Joachim Quantz heard him and commented: "Farinelli had a penetrating, full, rich, bright and well-modulated soprano voice, with a range at that time from the A below middle C to the D two octaves above middle C. ... His intonation was pure, his trill beautiful, his breath control extraordinary, and his throat very agile, so that he performed the widest intervals quickly and with the greatest ease and certainty. Passagework and all kinds of melismas were of no difficulty to him. In the invention of free ornamentation in adagio, he was very fertile." Quantz is certainly accurate in describing Farinelli as a soprano - since several arias in his repertoire require a sustained C6 - these include "Fremano l'onde" in Pietro Torri's opera Nicomede (1728) and "Troverai se a me ti fidi" in Niccolò Conforto's La Pesca (1737) His low range apparently extended to F3, as in "Al dolor che vo sfogando", an aria written by himself and incorporated in a pasticcio called Sabrina, and as in two of his own cadenzas for "Quell' usignolo innamorato" from Geminiano Giacomelli's Merope.

Farinelli sang at Bologna in 1727, where he met the famous castrato Antonio Bernacchi, twenty years his senior. In a duet in Orlandini's Antigona, Farinelli showed off all the aspects of the beauty of his voice and refinements of his style, executing a number of passages of great virtuosity, which were rewarded with tumultuous applause. Undaunted, Bernacchi repeated every trill, roulade, and cadenza of his young rival, but performing all of them even more exquisitely, and adding variations of his own. Farinelli, admitting defeat, entreated Bernacchi to give him instruction in grazie sopraffine ("ultra-refined graces"); Bernacchi agreed.

In 1728, as well as performing in Torri's Nicomede at the Munich court, Farinelli performed another concert before the Emperor in Vienna. In 1729, during the Carnival season in Venice, he sang in two works by Metastasio: as Arbace in Metastasio's Catone in Utica (music by Leonardo Leo) and Mirteo in Semiramide Riconosciuta (music by Porpora). In these important drammi per musica, performed at the Teatro San Giovanni Grisostomo of Venice, at his side sang some other singers of the first rank: Nicola Grimaldi, detto Nicolino (a mezzo-soprano castrato, who had earlier performed for Handel), the female soprano Lucia Facchinelli, another castrato Domenico Gizzi ("Virtuoso della Cappella Reale di Napoli"), and the bass Giuseppe Maria Boschi.

During this period, it seemed Farinelli, loaded with riches and honours, was so famous and so formidable as a performer that his rival and friend, the castrato Gioacchino Conti ("Gizziello") is said to have fainted from sheer despondency on hearing him sing. George Frideric Handel was also keen to engage Farinelli for his company in London, and while in Venice in January 1730, tried unsuccessfully to meet him.

In 1731, Farinelli visited Vienna for a third time. There he was received by the Emperor Charles VI, on whose advice, according to the singer's first biographer, Giovenale Sacchi, Farinelli modified his style, singing more simply and emotionally. Sacchi's source for this must have been Charles Burney's notes on his visit to Farinelli in 1770, published in London in 1773 in The present state of music in France and Italy..., here pp. 215-216. After further seasons in Italy and another visit to Vienna, during which he sang in oratorios in the Imperial chapel, Farinelli came to London in 1734.

== Farinelli in London ==
In London the previous year, Senesino, a singer who had been a part of George Frideric Handel's "Second Academy" which performed at the King's Theatre, Haymarket, quarrelled with Handel and moved to a rival company, the Opera of the Nobility, operating from a theatre in Lincoln's Inn Fields. This company had Porpora as composer and Senesino as principal singer, but it had not been a success during its first season of 1733–34. Farinelli, Porpora's most famous pupil, joined the company and made it financially solvent.

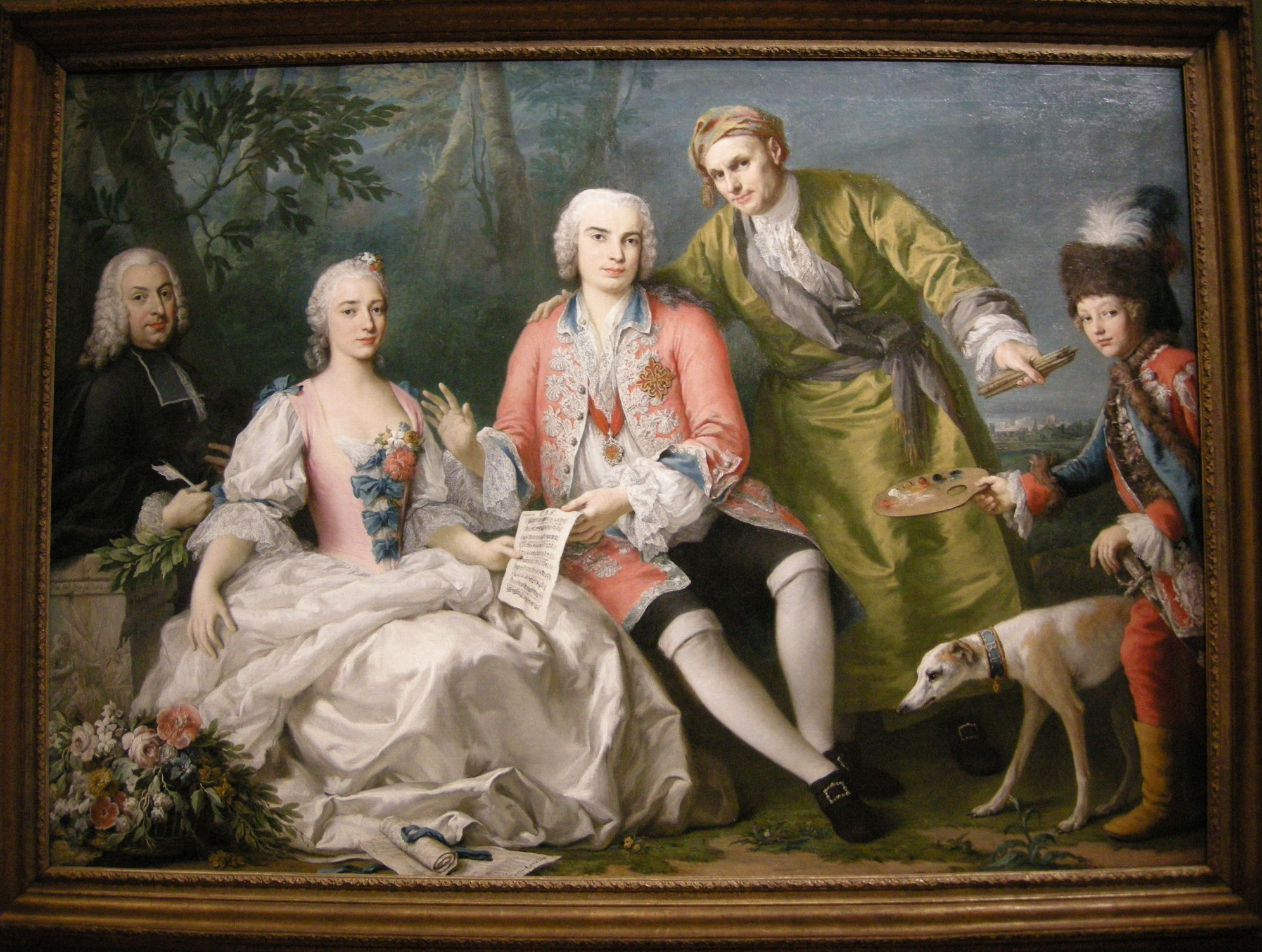
Farinelli and his friends. 1750–1752. Oil on canvas, by Amigoni. depicted from left to right: Metastasio, Teresa Castellini, Farinelli with the score "Vi conosco amate stelle" from Metastasio's Zenobia in a musical setting, the painter Amigoni, Farinelli's dog, Farinelli's page

He first appeared in Artaserse, a pasticcio with music by his brother Riccardo and Johann Adolph Hasse. He sang the memorable arias "Per questo dolce amplesso" (music by Hasse) and "Son qual nave" (music by Broschi), while Senesino sang "Pallido il sole" (music by Hasse). Of "Per questo dolce amplesso", Charles Burney reported: "Senesino had the part of a furious tyrant, and Farinelli that of an unfortunate hero in chains; but in the course of the first air, the captive so softened the heart of the tyrant, that Senesino, forgetting his stage-character, ran to Farinelli and embraced him in his own". "Son qual nave", on the other hand, was composed by Riccardo Broschi as a special showpiece for his brother's virtuosic skills. Burney described it thus: "The first note he sung was taken with such delicacy, swelled by minute degrees to such an amazing volume, and afterwards diminished in the same manner to a mere point, that it was applauded for full five minutes. After this, he set off with such brilliancy and rapidity of execution that it was difficult for the violins of those days to keep pace with him." In 1735 Farinelli and Senesino also appeared in Nicola Porpora's Polifemo.

Both the cognoscenti and the public adored him. The librettist Paolo Rolli, a close friend and supporter of Senesino, commented: "Farinelli has surprised me so much that I feel as though I had hitherto heard only a small part of the human voice, and now have heard it all. He has besides, the most amiable and polite manners ....". Some fans were more unrestrained: one titled lady was so carried away that, from a theatre box, she famously exclaimed: "One God, one Farinelli!", and was immortalised in a detail of Plate II of William Hogarth's "A Rake's Progress" (she may also appear in Plate IV of his series "Marriage A-la-Mode" of 1745).

Though Farinelli's success was enormous, neither the Nobility Opera nor Handel's company was able to sustain the public's interest, which waned rapidly. Though his official salary was £1500 for a season, gifts from admirers probably increased this to something more like £5000, an enormous sum at the time. Farinelli was by no means the only singer to receive such large amounts, which were unsustainable in the long term. As one contemporary observer remarked: "within these two years we have seen even Farinelli sing to an audience of five-and-thirty pounds". Nonetheless, he was still under contract in London in the summer of 1737 when he received a summons, via Sir Thomas Fitzgerald, Secretary of the Spanish Embassy there, to visit the Spanish court.

== At the court of Spain ==
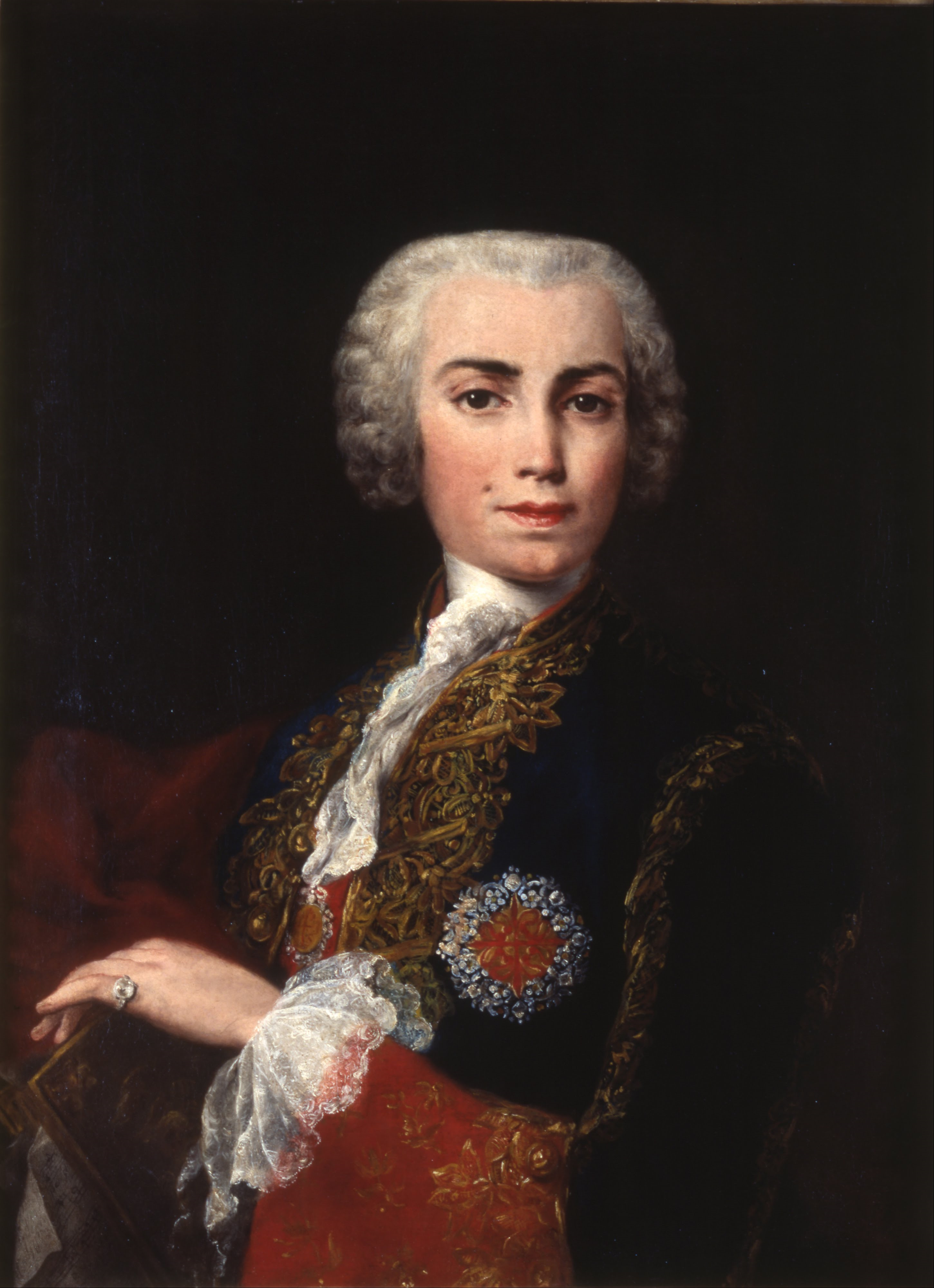
Carlo Broschi Farinelli in Spanish court dress wearing the Order of Calatrava, by Jacopo Amigoni c. 1752

Apparently intending to make only a brief visit to the Continent, Farinelli stopped at Paris on his way to Madrid, singing on 9 July at Versailles to King Louis XV, who gave him his portrait set in diamonds, and 500 louis d'or. On 15 July, he left for Spain, arriving about a month later. Elisabeth Farnese, the Queen, had come to believe that Farinelli's voice might be able to cure the severe depression of her husband, King Philip V (some contemporary physicians, such as the Queen's doctor Giuseppe Cervi, believed in the efficacy of music therapy). By royal decree, Farinelli was named chamber musician to the king and queen on 28 August 1737; two days later, the title criado familiar, meaning something like family servant to the king, was added. The decree provided Farinelli with an enormous salary, a coach with the necessary mules and a residence wherever the king happened to be.

For the remaining nine years of Philip's life, Farinelli was obliged to give nightly recitals, accompanied by other musicians, for King Philip, the queen and some select company in the king's chamber. In 1738, he may have assisted in arranging for the visit of an entire Italian opera company to Madrid, beginning a fashion for opera seria in Madrid. The Coliseo of the royal palace of Buen Retiro was remodelled. The operas given there were not public but attended by the king, the queen, the court and various important persons such as officers and ambassadors.

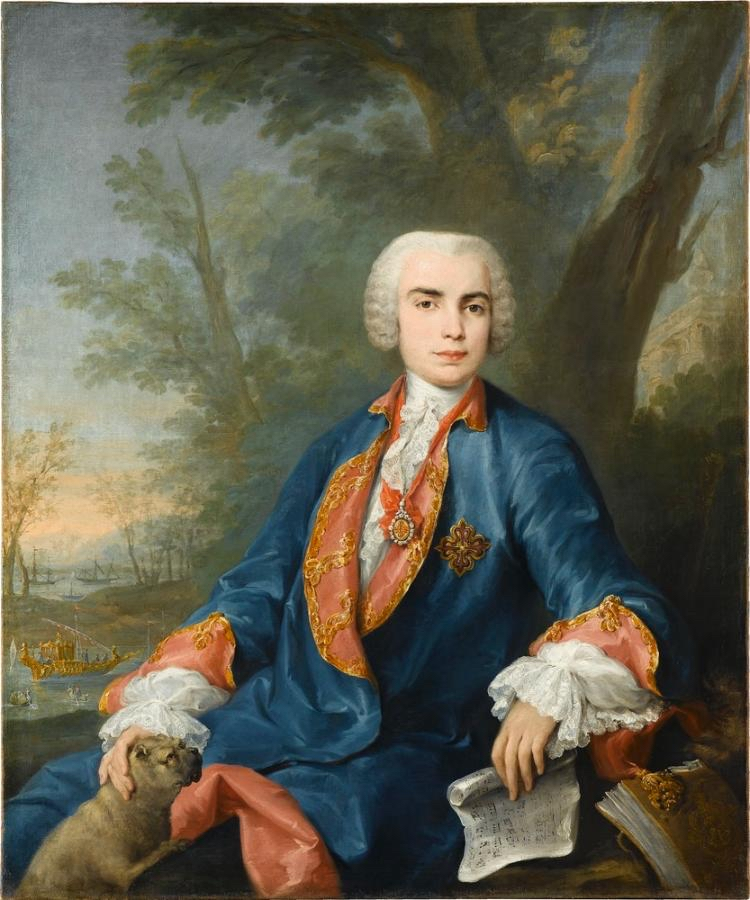
c.1752 portrait by Jacopo Amigoni

On the accession of Philip's son, Ferdinand VI, Farinelli's influence increased. Ferdinand was a keen musician, and his queen consort, Maria Bárbara of Portugal, was a highly accomplished harpsichordist for whom Domenico Scarlatti wrote most of his sonatas. Scarlatti had been her music master when she was a princess in Lisbon and followed her to Spain after her marriage in 1729. Scarlatti became the music master to both Maria Bárbara and Ferdinand and died in their service in 1757; the musicologist Ralph Kirkpatrick acknowledges Farinelli's correspondence as having provided "most of the direct information about Scarlatti that has transmitted itself to our day"). Under Phillip V Farinelli had gradually assumed a role in the production of operas, encouraged by Queen Isabel Farnesio (Elisabeth Farnese), although having little or nothing to do with the musical side of the performances. When Ferdinand came to the throne in 1746, Farinelli was made Director of the Court Opera. His production of a magnificent opera in 1750 caused the king to make him a Knight of the Order of Calatrava. In the same year, Felipe ordained that the house Farinelli shared at Aranjuez should be much enlarged and made more beautiful and that it should become a residence just for Farinelli himself, together with his staff. As producer and director of the court operatic events at the Buen Retiro palace in Madrid and at the royal seat at Aranjuez, Farinelli gradually extended his work to the creation of extraordinary illuminations and firework displays, once involving 60 thousand candles, both as part of the operas and as independent events, for instance on the king's name day. He also became involved in the small fleet of royal vessels on which the king, the queen and most of the court made excursions on the Tagus at Aranjuez. These excursions were probably instigated in 1752 without Farinelli's participation, but it may have been he who added two gilded barges to the fleet in 1753. On the excursions from 1754 to 1757, Farinelli, who directed these royal excursions from 1755 onwards (if not earlier), sang arias on board one of the gilded barges, 'La Real', accompanied by the king or the queen on the harpsichord. Sometimes the king played solo sonatas, and Farinelli and the queen once sang a duet. By nightfall, the vessels would have returned to find the riverbanks and the point of disembarkation all lit up by tens of thousands of candles, organized beforehand by Farinelli. On these evenings, Farinelli sang again in public, the star in an informal concert given on a gilded barge on the river, his accompanists the king and queen. The last excursion took place in July 1757. Farinelli's last illuminations and his last operatic production were for the king's nameday in May 1758. Queen Maria Bárbara, who attended these final festivities, died at the end of August the same year; King Ferdinand died in August 1759.

== Retirement and death ==
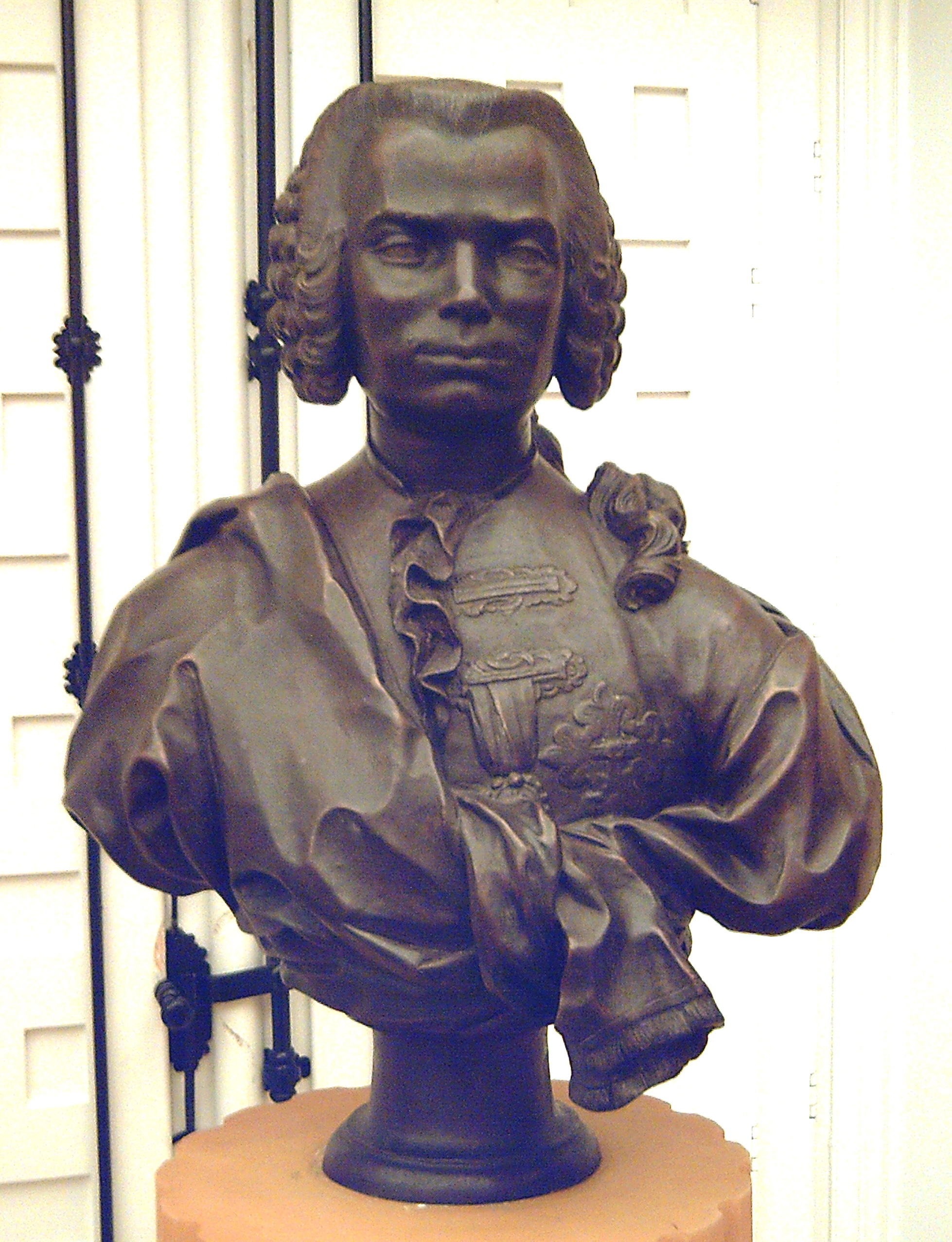
Anonymous Neoclassical bust of Farinelli (R.A.B.A.S.F., Madrid)

Ferdinand was succeeded by his half-brother Charles III in 1759. He had no time for music, so it seems: he disbanded the opera and discharged Farinelli but granted him his full salary for the rest of his life. Farinelli returned to Italy, where he lived out his days at the beautiful villa he had built outside Bologna (he had acquired citizenship of that city as well as the necessary land as long ago as 1732). Though rich and still famous, visited by such notable figures as Charles Burney, Leopold Mozart and his son Wolfgang Amadeus, and Casanova, he would have been lonely in his old age, having outlived many of his friends and former colleagues. One distinguished friend of his later years was the music historian, Giovanni Battista (known as "Padre") Martini, who lived in Bologna. Farinelli also continued his correspondence with Metastasio, the court poet at Vienna, dying a few months after him. In his will (Achivio Notarile Gambarini Lorenzo 1782 10 Gennaio - 23 Xbre, 5/14, Achivio di Stato di Bologna), dated 20 February 1782, Farinelli asked to be buried in the mantle of the Order of Calatrava, as ordained in the statutes of the order, and was interred at the city's Capuchin monastery of Santa Croce. His estate included gifts from royalty, a large collection of paintings including works by Velázquez, Murillo, and Jusepe de Ribera, as well as portraits of his royal patrons, and several of himself, some by his friend Jacopo Amigoni and one by Corrado Giaquinto now in the Museo Civico di Bologna. The inventory of his estate includes a collection of seven keyboard instruments in which he took great delight, especially a piano made in Florence in 1730 (called in the will cembalo a martellini), inherited from Queen Maria Bárbara, and violins by Stradivarius and Amati (Achivio Notarile Gambarini Lorenzo 1782 BIS, 5/14, 17, Achivio di Stato di Bologna).

Farinelli died in Bologna on 16 September 1782. His original place of burial was destroyed during the Napoleonic Wars, and in 1810, Farinelli's great-niece, Maria Carlotta Pisani, had his remains transferred to the cemetery of La Certosa in Bologna. Maria Carlotta bequeathed many of Farinelli's letters to University of Bologna's library and was buried in the same grave as Farinelli in 1850.

== Farinelli's other musical activities ==
Farinelli not only sang, but like most musicians of his time, was a competent harpsichordist. He also played the viola d'amore. He occasionally composed, writing a cantata of farewell to London (entitled Ossequiosissimo ringraziamento, for which he also wrote the text), and a few songs and arias, including one dedicated to Ferdinand VI.

=== Vocal works ===
- Ossequiosissimo ringraziamento
- La partenza
- Orfeo – with Riccardo Broschi
- Recitative: Ogni di piu molesto dunque
- Recitative: Invan ti chiamo
- Aria: Io sperai del porto in seno
- Aria: Al dolor che vo sfogando
- Aria: Non sperar, non lusingarti
- Aria: Che chiedi? Che brami?

== The artist and his contemporaries ==
Farinelli was a prominent opera singer of the castrato era, which lasted from the early 1600s into the early 1800s. A number of celebrated singers arose during this period, originating especially from the Neapolitan School, referring to such composers as Nicola Porpora, Alessandro Scarlatti, and Francesco Durante. Performers Caffarelli, Matteuccio, Siface, Senesino, Gizziello, Marchesi, and Carestini, among others, were considered gifted in their own right, with Caffarelli being the most vocally proficient. Farinelli, above the rest, was admired for his modesty, his intelligence, his unassuming attitude, and his dedication to his work. He respected his colleagues, composers, and impresarios, often earning their lifelong friendship as a result, whereas Caffarelli was notoriously capricious and disrespectful to anyone sharing the stage with him, to the point of cackling and booing fellow singers during their own arias.

Farinelli's technical proficiency allowed him to be comfortable in all vocal registers from tenor to soprano, though he favoured the medium-to-high register rather than the very-high. This proficiency allowed him to convey emotion rather than astonish by sheer technique, while colleagues preferred to startle audiences with vocal stunts. This "soft" approach to music no doubt helped him survive his 22-year private engagement at the court of Spain, after his theatrical career had ended when he was aged only 32, a career in which he had already achieved every possible success on every European stage, and, even in retirement in Bologna, was still regarded by every foreign dignitary visiting the city as the preferred music star to meet.

== Farinelli Study Centre ==
Farinelli lived in Bologna from 1761 until his death. The Farinelli Study Centre (Centro Studi Farinelli) was opened in Bologna in 1998. Major events and achievements in which it was involved have included:

- The restoration of Farinelli's grave in the Certosa of Bologna (2000)
- An historical exhibition Farinelli a Bologna (2001 and 2005)
- The inauguration of a City Park in the name of Farinelli, near the site where the singer lived in Bologna (2002)
- An international symposium Il Farinelli e gli evirati cantori on the occasion of Farinelli's 300th anniversary of his birth (2005)
- An official publication Il fantasma del Farinelli (2005)
- The disinterment of Farinelli at the Certosa of Bologna (2006)

== Portrayals of Farinelli in literature, film, radio, opera and theatre ==
Farinelli is represented in Voltaire's Candide.

A film, Farinelli, directed by Gérard Corbiau, was made about Farinelli's life in 1994. This takes considerable dramatic licence with history, emphasising the importance of Farinelli's brother and reducing Porpora's role, while Handel becomes an antagonist; the singer's 22 years spent in the Spanish court are only vaguely hinted at, as well as his brother being appointed Minister of War. Farinelli's supposed sexual escapades are a major element of the film's plot, and are totally spurious according to historians (primarily, Patrick Barbier's "Histoire des castrats", Paris 1989).

In opera: Farinelli is a character in the opera La Part du Diable, composed by Daniel Auber to a libretto by Eugène Scribe; the title-role in the opera Farinelli by the English composer John Barnett, first performed at Drury Lane in 1839, where his part is written for a tenor (this work is itself an adaptation of the anonymous Farinelli, ou le Bouffe du Roi, premiered in Paris in 1835). More recent operas include Matteo d'Amico's Farinelli, la voce perduta (1996) and Farinelli, oder die Macht des Gesanges by Siegfried Matthus (1998).

Composer and performer Rinde Eckert gives Farinelli's time in Spain a contemporary treatment in his 1995 work for radio, Four Songs Lost in a Wall, commissioned by New American Radio.

That period in his life is also the setting for Farinelli and the King (the king in question being Philip V of Spain), a play by Claire van Kampen, which premiered at the Sam Wanamaker Playhouse from 11 February to 7 March 2015. It was transferred to the Duke of York's Theatre in London's West End in the final months of 2015, with the role of Farinelli doubled between speaking and singing, with Iestyn Davies performing the latter. Van Kampen's Farinelli and the King was performed on Broadway at the Belasco Theatre from 5 December 2017, to 25 March 2018.

Farinelli is portrayed by Raúl Ferrando in the episode "Fly Away" of the 2021 Netflix Original Series "The Cook of Castamar".
