= Giovanni Manzuoli =

Italian singer

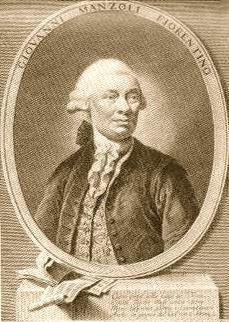
Giovanni Manzuoli

Giovanni Manzuoli (Giovanni Manzoli) (1720–1782) was an Italian castrato who sang as a soprano at the beginning of his career, and later as a contralto.

== History ==
Born in Florence, Italy, Manzuoli began singing there in 1731. After performing in Verona in 1735, he relocated and performed in Naples until 1748, including at the recently built (1737) Teatro di San Carlo. He is documented as also singing and acting in the following locales for the years indicated:

- 1749–1752 Madrid
- 1754 Parma
- 1755 Lisbon and Madrid
- 1755–1764 various locales throughout Italy
- 1760 Vienna
- 1764–1765 London (King's Theatre)
- 1768–1771 Milan

During Manzuoli's sojourn to London, he became friends with the Mozart family, later creating the role of Ascanio in Mozart's Ascanio in Alba, which premiered in 1771. While in Milan, he was appointed Chamber Singer to the Duke of Tuscany. His final appearance was in Milano in 1771. He died eleven years later.

== Description of performance ==
Charles Burney, a contemporary music historian, described the Florentine castrato thus: "Manzoli's voice was the most powerful and voluminous soprano that had ever been heard on our stage since the time of Farinelli; and his manner of singing was grand and full of dignity. The applause he received was a universal thunder of acclimation."
