= Gioacchino Conti =

Italian opera singer

Gioacchino Conti (28 February 1714 – 25 October 1761), best known as Gizziello or Egizziello, was an Italian soprano castrato opera singer.

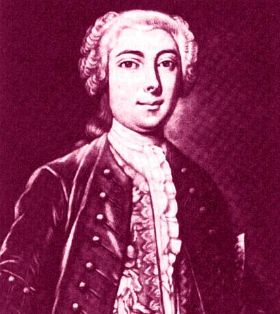
Gioacchino Conti

== Biography ==
Conti was born in Arpino in 1714, possibly the son of the composer Nicola Conti. After studying in Naples with Domenico Gizzi, after whom he would later be nicknamed, he made his debut in Rome at an early age, around 1730. According to some modern encyclopedic sources, it took place in Leonardo Vinci's Artaserse, which premiered on 4 February at the Teatro delle Dame. However, his name does not appear in the cast of the original libretto, and his theatrical debut ought probably to be dated instead in 1731, in revivals of Didone abbandonata and of the same Artaserse, both by Vinci. A colourful anecdote relates how another overweening castrato star, Caffarelli, rode post-haste to Rome from Naples just to attend incognito his debut; and full of enthusiasm eventually yelled at him: "Bravo, bravissimo Gizziello, it’s Caffariello who's telling you!" Whatever the case, at the beginning of 1732 he was urgently called upon to replace the castrato Nicolò Grimaldi (Nicolini), who suddenly died on 1 January during the rehearsals of Pergolesi's first opera La Salustia at the Teatro San Bartolomeo in Naples. Having become a member of the theatre's company, later that year he performed in new operas by Johann Adolph Hasse, Leonardo Leo and Francesco Mancini, and in revivals of Vinci's Catone in Utica and Artaserse.

His subsequent career led him throughout Italy, as well as abroad. In 1736–37 he was in London, where he had been engaged by George Frideric Handel, with whom he would build a profitable collaboration. Conti performed in many of his works, such as Atalanta, Giustino, Berenice and Arminio, as well as in revivals of Ariodante, Partenope, and Alcina.

He sang at many premieres for musicians of his time, including Niccolò Jommelli (Manlio, 1746), Baldassare Galuppi (Artaserse, 1751) and Johann Adolph Hasse (Demetrio, 1747).

After 1759, Conti left the stage and settled in Rome, where he spent the last two years of his life.

Conti was a soprano with an unusually high range for his time, Handel repeatedly wrote part for him that reached C6. He did not favour excessive coloratura, and chose instead a smooth, fluent style of delivery and expression. He became known as a sentimental and gentle singer, although his vocal technique remained excellent, if less acrobatic than that of his contemporary (and friend) Farinelli.

== Sources ==
- (in Italian) Rodolfo Celletti, Storia del belcanto, Fiesole, Discanto Edizioni, 1983, pp. 105–106, 125.
- (in Italian) Salvatore Caruselli (ed.), Grande enciclopedia della musica lirica, Rome, Longanesi &C. Periodici S.p.A. (article: Conti, Gioacchino, detto Gizziello, I, p. 295).
- Winton Dean, Conti, Gioacchino ['Egizziello', 'Gizziello'], in Stanley Sadie (ed.), The New Grove Dictionary of Opera, New York, Grove (Oxford University Press), 1997, I, pp. 927–928. ISBN 978-0-19-522186-2.
- (in French) François-Joseph Fétis, Biographie universelle des musiciens et bibliographie générale de la musique (second edition), Paris, Didot, 1866, II, pp. 350–352 (article: Conti (Joachin); accessible for free online at Gallica - BNF).
- (in Italian) Corrado Lisena, Conti, Gioacchino, in Dizionario Biografico degli Italiani, Volume 28, 1983, accessible online at Treccani.it.
- (in Italian) Carlantonio di Villarosa, Memorie dei compositori di musica del Regno di Napoli raccolte dal Marchese di Villarosa, Naples, Stamperia Reale, 1840, pp. 53–54 (article: Conti Gioacchino; accessible for free online at Books Google).
