= Domenico Gizzi =

Italian composer and singing teacher

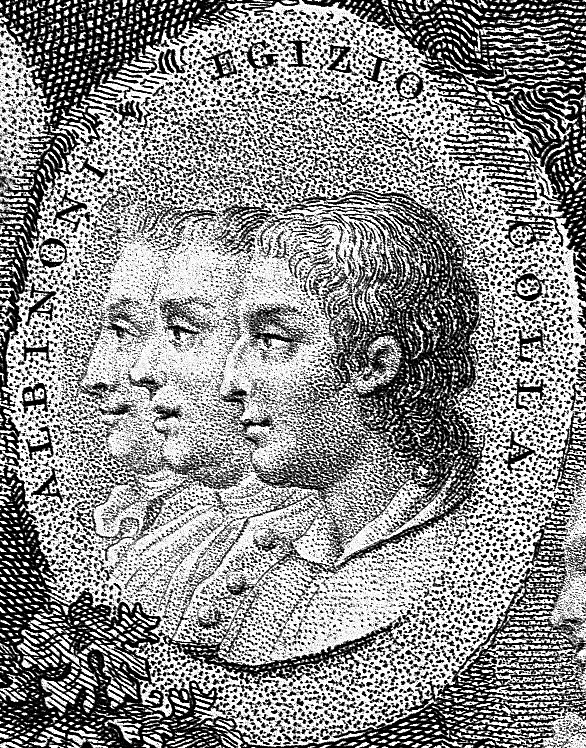
Engraving of Italian composers Tomaso Albinoni, Domenico Gizzi and Giuseppe Colla by Pietro Bettelini, after a drawing by Luigi Scotti.

Domenico Gizzi (Arpino, 1680 – Naples, 1745) was an Italian composer and singing teacher. Also known as "Egizio" or "Egiziello", he founded a famous singing school in 1720 and among his pupils counted Francesco Feo and Gioacchino Conti, who was named "Gizziello" in his teacher's honour.
