= Caffarelli (castrato) =

Italian castrato (1710–1783)

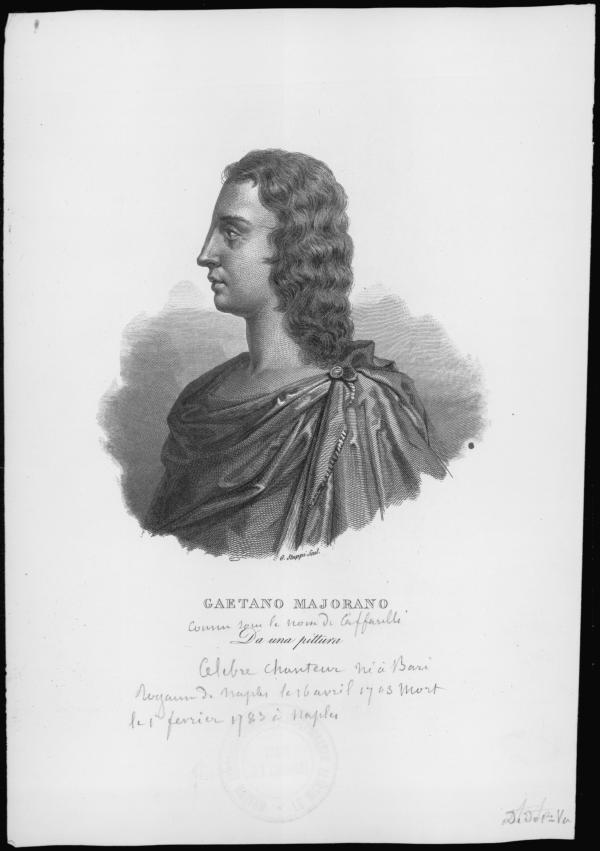
Gaetano Majorano

Gaetano Majorano (12 April 1710 – 31 January 1783) was an Italian castrato and opera singer, who performed under the stage name Caffarelli. Like Farinelli, Caffarelli was a student of Nicola Porpora.

== Early life and training ==
Caffarelli was born Gaetano Carmine Francesco Paolo Majorano to Vito Majorano and Anna Fornella in Bitonto. His early life is uncertain. His stage name, Caffarelli, is said to be taken from an early teacher, Caffaro, who taught him music in childhood; others say it was taken from a patron, Domenico Caffaro. There is evidence that he personally desired to be castrated. When aged ten, he was given the income from two vineyards owned by his grandmother, according to the legal document, so that he could study grammar and, especially, music: "to which he is said to have a great inclination, desiring to have himself castrated and become a eunuch". He became the pupil of Nicola Porpora. According to legend, Porpora kept the young Caffarelli working from one sheet of exercises for six years, and then eventually declared, "Go, my son: I have no more to teach you. You are the greatest singer in Europe".

== Career ==
In Carnival 1726, aged 15, he made his debut at Rome in Domenico Sarro's Valdemaro, singing the third female role, and listed with the stage name “Caffarellino.” His fame spread rapidly throughout Italy during the 1730s, with performances at Venice, Turin, Milan, Florence, before returning to Rome for a great success in Johann Adolf Hasse's Cajo Fabricio. His time in London was not particularly successful, public memory of Farinelli being too strong, but at the King's Theatre during the 1737–38 season he created roles in Giovanni Battista Pescetti's pasticcio Arsace and Handel's Faramondo, in addition to the title role in Handel's Serse, singing the famous aria "Ombra mai fù".

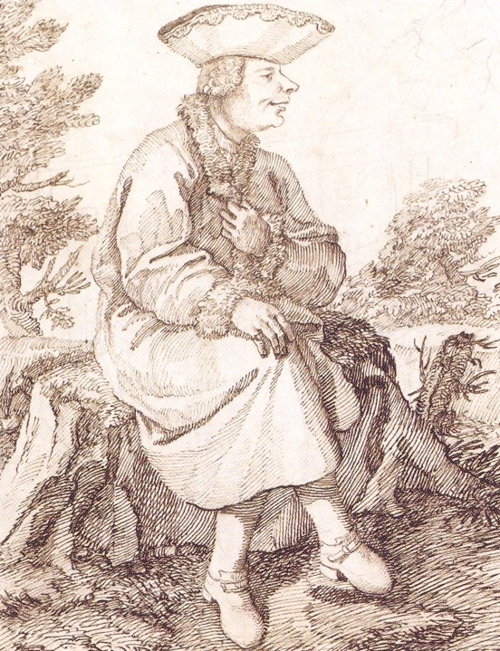
a caricature of Caffarelli by Pier Leone Ghezzi, c. 1740

In later years, he worked in Madrid (1739), Vienna (1749), Versailles (1753), and Lisbon (1755). His career in France, to which he had been invited by Louis XV, was suddenly cut short after he badly wounded a poet during a duel, and he left in disgrace after only one year. In 1734, the singer had taken up a post at the royal chapel of Naples, and over the next twenty years, he often performed at the Teatro di San Carlo. At Naples, he sang for Pergolesi, Porpora, Hasse, and Leonardo Vinci, not to mention starring in Gluck's La Clemenza di Tito. After 1756, he sang little, though in 1770 Charles Burney heard him and praised his "expression and grace." Always a favourite of royal families and a first-rate castrato who could command vast fees, Caffarelli made a large fortune and was able to buy himself a dukedom and impressive estates in Naples and Calabria. On a palazzo he built, he added the superscription "Amphion (Note: Legend has the number of Amphion's children as anything from seven to twelve. Caffarelli was obviously childless.) Thebas, ego domum" ("Amphion built Thebes, I this house"). However, he fell foul of local wit when some wag mockingly added to this "ille cum, tu sine" ("he with, you without").

== Character ==
Caffarelli was notorious for his unpredictability and displays of temperament, both on and off stage. On stage, he is reputed to have sung his own preferred versions irrespective of what his colleagues were doing, mimicking them while they sang their solos and sometimes conversing with members of the public in their boxes during that time. Offstage, his pugnacity and fierce demeanour led to his willingness to fight duels under little provocation. Such behaviour led to spells of house arrest and imprisonment for assault and for misconduct during performances. Most infamously, he completely humiliated a prima donna during a performance of Hasse's Antigono in 1745. On the other hand, with Handel, also a famously fiery character, he seems to have been able to coexist on a peaceable basis, perhaps due to the fantastic sums of money the composer paid him for his work.

Time, furthermore, seemed to soften Caffarelli. In the latter years of his life, he donated extensively to charity, and when Burney met the singer, he was impressed by his politeness. He died in Naples.

== Voice and reputation ==
Caffarelli's voice was that of a mezzo-soprano, with an extensive range and a high tessitura. Those who heard him sing ranked him only behind his direct competitor Farinelli as the finest singer of that time. Farinelli, however, ended his public career at just 32, while Caffarelli kept performing well into his fifties and over. Even at the end of his career, Burney thought that he had been "an amazing fine singer". His teacher, Porpora, who (according to Burney) loathed Caffarelli's overweening arrogance, nonetheless claimed that he was "the greatest singer Italy had ever produced". Friedrich Melchior Grimm summed up his qualities:

It would be difficult to give any idea of the degree of perfection to which this singer has brought his art. All the charms and love that can make up the idea of an angelic voice, and which form the character of his, added to the finest execution, and to surprising facility and precision, exercise an enchantment over the senses and the heart, which even those least sensible to music would find it hard to resist.

With the nickname "Caffariello," Caffarelli is brought up in the libretto for Rossini's opera The Barber of Seville written by Cesare Sterbini. He is singled out in Act 2 by the stuffy Dr. Bartolo as a singer who exemplified the greatness of the operatic culture of the past.
