= Marianna Bulgarelli =

Italian opera singer

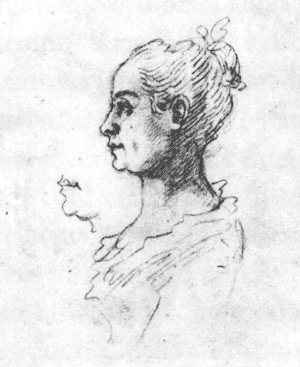
Marianna Bulgarelli

Marianna Bulgarelli (c. 1684 – 26 February 1734), also known as Maria Anna Benti, was an Italian soprano of the 18th century.

Bulgarelli was born and died in Rome; hence her nickname, "La Romanina." She is best remembered as an early patron of, and sympathizer with, the youthful Metastasio, whose work she encouraged and helped to develop. She was also a popular and successful singer of opera seria, renowned for her acting ability in particular.
