= List of operas by Niccolò Piccinni =

This is a complete list of the operas of the Italian composer Niccolò Piccinni (1728–1800).

== List ==
Title	Genre	Subdivisions	Libretto	Première date	Place, theatre
Le donne dispettose (or: Le trame per amore; La massara spiritosa)	opera buffa		Antonio Palomba	autumn 1754	Naples, Teatro dei Fiorentini
Il curioso del suo proprio danno	opera buffa	3 acts	Antonio Palomba, after El ingenioso hidalgo Don Quijote de la Mancha by Miguel de Cervantes Saavedra	Carnival 1755/1756?	Naples, Teatro Nuovo
Le gelosie (or: Le gelosie, o Le nozze in confusione)	opera buffa		Giovanni Battista Lorenzi	spring 1755	Naples, Teatro dei Fiorentini
Zenobia	opera seria	3 acts	Metastasio	18 December 1756	Naples, Teatro San Carlo; revised version: 1768, Naples
L'amante ridicolo (or: L'amante ridicolo e deluso; L'amante deluso)	intermezzo	2 acts	Alessandro Pioli	1757	Naples, Teatro Nuovo
La schiava seria (or: Die Sklavin)	intermezzo			1757	Naples
Caio Mario	opera seria		Gaetano Roccaforte	1757?	Naples, Teatro San Carlo; revised version: 20 January 1765, Naples, Teatro San Carlo
Nitteti (in collaboration with Gioacchino Cocchi)	opera seria	3 acts	Metastasio	4 November 1757	Naples, Teatro San Carlo
Alessandro nell'Indie	opera seria	3 acts	Metastasio	21 January 1758	Rome, Teatro Argentina; 2nd version: 12 January 1774, Naples, Teatro San Carlo
Gli uccellatori	opera buffa		after Carlo Goldoni	1758	Naples or Venice
Madama Arrighetta (or: Petiton; Monsieur Petiton)	opera buffa	3 acts	Antonio Palomba, after Monsieur Petiton by Carlo Goldoni	autumn or winter 1758	Naples, Teatro Nuovo
La scaltra letterata (or: La scaltra spiritosa)	opera buffa	3 acts	Antonio Palomba	winter 1758	Naples, Teatro Nuovo
Siroe rè di Persia	opera seria	3 acts	Metastasio	1759	Naples
Ciro riconosciuto	opera seria	3 acts	Metastasio	4 November 1759	Naples, Teatro San Carlo
La buona figliuola (or La Cecchina)	dramma giocoso	3 acts	Carlo Goldoni after Samuel Richardson	6 February 1760	Rome, Teatro delle Dame
L'Origille	opera buffa		Antonio Palomba	spring 1760	Naples, Teatro dei Fiorentini
Il rè pastore	opera seria	3 acts	Metastasio	autumn 1760	Florence, Teatro della Pergola
La furba burlata (or: I furbi burlati) (written with Nicola Logroscino (1698–1765): summer 1762, Naples, Teatro Nuovo; with additions by Giacomo Insanguine (1728–1795) as I furbi burlati: 1773, Naples)	opera buffa	3 acts	P. di Napoli?, after Antonio Palomba	autumn 1760	Naples, Teatro dei Fiorentini
Le beffe giovevoli	opera buffa		after Carlo Goldoni	winter 1760	Naples, Teatro dei Fiorentini
Le vicende della sorte (or: Le vicende del caso ossia della sorte; Der Glückswechsel)	intermezzo	3 acts	Giuseppe Petrosellini, after I Portentosi effetti della madre natura by Carlo Goldoni	3 January 1761	Rome, Teatro Valle
La schiavitù per amore	intermezzo			Carnival 1761	Rome
Olimpiade	opera seria		Metastasio	Carnival 1761	Rome, Teatro delle Dame; 2nd version: 1768, Rome, Teatro Argentina; revised 2nd version: 30 May 1774, Naples, Teatro San Carlo
Tigrane (or: Farnaspe)	opera seria	3 acts	Vittorio Amedeo Cigna-Santi, after Carlo Goldoni's revision of the drama by Francesco Silvani	Carnival 1761	Turin, Teatro Regio
Demofoonte	opera seria	3 acts	Metastasio (Demofonte)	May 1761	Reggio Emilia, Teatro Moderno
La buona figliuola maritata (or: La baronessa riconosciuta e maritata; Cecchina maritata)	opera buffa	3 acts	Carlo Goldoni	May 1761	Bologna, Teatro Formagliari
Il curioso imprudente (revised version of Il curioso del suo proprio danno with Antonio Sacchini)		3 acts	Antonio Palomba, after El ingenioso hidalgo Don Quijote de la Mancha by Miguel de Cervantes Saavedra	autumn 1761	Naples, Teatro dei Fiorentini
Lo stravagante	opera buffa	3 acts	Antonio Villani	autumn 1761	Naples, Teatro dei Fiorentini
L'astuto balordo	opera buffa		Giovanni Battista Fagiuoli	winter 1761	Naples, Teatro dei Fiorentini
L'astrologa	opera buffa	3 acts	Pietro Chiari	Carnival 1761/1762	Venice, Teatro San Moisè
Amor senza malizia	opera buffa			1762	Nuremberg, Hoftheater Thurn und Taxis
Artaserse	opera seria	3 acts	Metastasio	3 February 1762	Rome, Teatro Argentina; revised version: 4 November 1768 or 1772, Naples, Teatro San Carlo
Le avventure di Ridolfo	intermezzo		Lazzaro Mazzei	Carnival 1762	Bologna, Teatro Marsigli-Rossi
La bella verità	opera buffa	3 acts	Carlo Goldoni	12 June 1762	Bologna, Teatro Marsigli-Rossi
Antigono	opera seria	3 acts	Metastasio	4 November 1762	Naples, Teatro Nuovo
Il cavaliere per amore (or: Il fumo villano) (in collaboration with Bernardo Ottani)	opera buffa	2 acts	Giuseppe Petrosellini	winter 1762	Naples, Teatro Nuovo (or: Carnival 1763, Rome, Teatro Valle)
Le donne vendicate (or: Il vago disprezzato; Le fat méprisé)	intermezzo	2 acts	after Carlo Goldoni	Carnival 1763	Rome, Teatro Valle
Le contadine bizzarre (or: La sciocchezza in amore; Le contadine astute; Le villanelle astute)	opera buffa	3 acts	Giuseppe Petrosellini	February 1763	Rome, Teatro Capranica (or: autumn 1763, Venice, Teatro San Samuele
Gli stravaganti, ossia La schiava riconosciuta (or: La schiava; Gli stravaganti, ossia I matrimoni alla moda; L'esclave ou Le marin généreux; Die Ausschweifenden) (with additions by Joseph Haydn)	intermezzo	2 acts		1 January 1764	Rome, Teatro Valle
La villeggiatura (revised version of Le donne vendicate)	opera buffa	3 acts	after Carlo Goldoni	Carnival 1764	Bologna, Teatro Formagliari
Il parrucchiere	intermezzo			Carnival 1764	Rome, Teatro Valle
L'incognita perseguitata (with additions by Joseph Haydn)	opera buffa	3 acts	Giuseppe Petrosellini	Carnival 1764	Venice, Teatro San Samuele
L'equivoco	opera buffa	3 acts	Liviano Lantino and Antonio Villani	summer 1764	Naples, Teatro Fiorentini
La donna vana	opera buffa	3 acts	Antonio Palomba	November 1764	Naples, Teatro dei Fiorentini
Il nuovo Orlando	opera buffa		after Ludovico Ariosto	26 December 1764	Modena, Teatro Rangoni
Il barone di Torreforte	intermezzo	2 acts		10 January 1765	Rome, Teatro Capranica
Il finto astrologo	intermezzo		after Carlo Goldoni	7 February 1765	Rome, Teatro Valle
L'orfana insidiata (with additions by Gennaro Astarita (1745–1803))	opera buffa			summer 1765	Naples, Teatro dei Fiorentini
La Pescatrici ovvero L'Erede riconosciuta (or: La pescatrice innocente)	intermezzo	2 acts	after Carlo Goldoni	9 January 1766	Rome, Teatro Capranica
La baronessa di Montecupo	intermezzo			27 January 1766	Rome, Teatro Capranica
L'incostante (or: Il volubile; La capricciosa)	intermezzo	2 acts	Antonio Palomba	February 1766	Rome, Teatro Capranica
La fiammetta generosa (with Pasquale Anfossi (1727–1797))	opera buffa	3 acts		Carnival 1766	Naples, Teatro dei Fiorentini
La molinarella (or: Il cavaliere Ergasto; La molinara)	opera buffa	3 acts		autumn 1766	Naples, Teatro Nuovo
Il gran Cid (or: Il Cid)	opera seria	3 acts	Giovacchino Pizzi after Pierre Corneille	4 November 1766	Naples, Teatro San Carlo
La francese maligna				1766/1767	Naples or 1769, Rome
La notte critica	opera buffa	3 acts	Carlo Goldoni	Carnival 1767	Lisbon, Teatro Salvaterra
La finta baronessa	opera buffa		Filippo Livigni	summer 1767	Naples, Teatro dei Fiorentini
Mazzina, Acetone e Dindimento	opera buffa			c. 1767?	Naples?
La direttrice prudente (or: La prudente ingegnosa)	opera buffa	3 acts		autumn 1767	
Gli napoletani in America	opera buffa	3 acts	Francesco Cerlone	10 June 1768	Naples, Teatro dei Fiorentini
La locandiera di spirito	opera buffa	3 acts		autumn 1768	Naples, Teatro Nuovo
Lo sposo burlato	intermezzo	2 acts	Giovanni Battista Casti	5 January 1769	Rome, Teatro Valle
L'innocenza riconosciuta	opera buffa			11 January 1769	Senigallia
La finta ciarlatana ossia Il vecchio credulo	opera buffa			Carnival 1769	Naples, Teatro Nuovo
Demetrio	opera seria		Metastasio	30 May 1769	Naples, Teatro San Carlo
Gli sposi perseguitati	opera buffa		Pasquale Mililotti	1769	Naples, Teatro Nuovo
Didone abbandonata	opera seria	3 acts	Metastasio	8 January 1770	Rome, Teatro Argentina
Cesare in Egitto (or: Cesare e Cleopatra)	opera seria	3 acts	Giacomo Francesco Bussani	January 1770	Milan, Teatro Regio Ducale
La donna di spirito	opera buffa			13 February 1770	Rome, Teatro Capranica
Il regno della luna (or: Il mondo della luna)	opera buffa			spring 1770	Milan, Teatro Regio Ducale
Gelosia per gelosia	opera buffa		Giovanni Battista Lorenzi	summer 1770, Naples	Teatro dei Fiorentini
Don Chisciotte	opera buffa		Giovanni Battista Lorenzi, after Miguel de Cervantes Saavedra	1770	Naples?
Il finto pazzo per amore	opera buffa			1770	Naples?
Catone in Utica		3 acts	Metastasio	5 November 1770	Mannheim, Hoftheater
L'olandese in Italia	opera buffa		Niccolò Tassi	autumn 1770	Milan, Teatro Regio Ducale
La donna di bell'umore	opera buffa			15 May 1771	Naples, Teatro dei Fiorentini
La Corsara	opera buffa	3 acts	Giovanni Battista Lorenzi	autumn 1771	Naples, Teatro dei Fiorentini
Le finte gemelle (or: Le due finte gemelle; Le germane in equivoco)	intermezzo	2 or 3 acts	Giuseppe Petrosellini	2 January 1771	Rome, Teatro Valle
L'americano (or: L'americano incivilito; L'americano ingentilito)	intermezzo	2 acts		22 February 1772	Rome, Teatro Caprnica
L'astratto, ovvero Il giocator fortunato (or: Il giocator fanatico per il lotto) (with additions by Joseph Haydn)	opera buffa	3 acts	Giuseppe Petrosellini	Carnival 1772	Venice, Teatro San Samuele
Le trame zingaresche	opera buffa		Giovanni Battista Lorenzi	summer 1772	Naples, Teatro dei Fiorentini
Ipermestra	opera seria	3 acts	Metastasio	4 November 1772	Naples, Teatro San Carlo
Scipione in Cartagena	opera seria	3 acts	Luigi Giusti (or: Alvise Giusti?)	26 December 1772?	Modena, Teatro di Corte
La sposa collerica	intermezzo			9 January 1773	Rome, Teatro Valle
Le quattro nazioni o La vedova scaltra	opera buffa		after Carlo Goldoni's comedy	1773	Rome?
Il vagabondo fortunato	opera buffa		Pasquale Mililotti	autumn 1773	Naples, Teatro dei Fiorentini
Gli amanti mascherati	opera buffa			May 1774	Naples, Teatro dei Fiorentini
Il conclave del MDCCLXXIV			after Metastasio	Carnival 1775	Rome, Teatro delle Dame
L'ignorante astuto	opera buffa	3 acts	Pasquale Mililotti	Carnival 1775	Naples, Teatro dei Fiorentini
Enea in Cuma	parodia		Pasquale Mililotti	spring 1775	Naples, Teatro dei Fiorentini
Il sordo	intermezzo			1775	Naples
I viaggiatori	opera buffa		Pasquale Mililotti?, after Carlo Goldoni	autumn 1775	Naples, Teatro dei Fiorentini
La contessina	opera buffa	3 acts	Marco Coltellini, after Carlo Goldoni	autumn 1775	Verona, Teatro Filarmonico
Radamisto	opera seria	3 acts	Antonio Marchi	1776	Naples
Vittorina	opera buffa		Carlo Goldoni	16 December 1777	London, King's Theatre
Roland	tragédie lyrique	3 acts	Jean-François Marmontel, after Philippe Quinault and Ludovico Ariosto	27 January 1778	Paris, Académie Royale
Phaon	drame lyrique	2 acts	Claude-Henri Watelet	September 1778	Choisy-le-Roi, Hoftheater
Il vago disprezzato (or: Le fat méprisé)	opera buffa		after Carlo Goldoni	16 May 1779	Paris, Académie Royale
Atys	tragédie lyrique	3 acts	Jean-François Marmontel, after Philippe Quinault	22 February 1780	Paris, Académie Royale
Iphigénie en Tauride	tragédie lyrique	4 acts	Alphonse du Congé Dubreuil, after Claude Guimond de La Touche	23 January 1781	Paris, Académie Royale
Adèle de Ponthieu	tragédie lyrique	3 acts	Jean-Paul-André des Rasins de Saint-Marc	27 October 1781	Paris, Académie Royale
Didon	tragédie lyrique	3 acts	Jean-François Marmontel, after Metastasio and Nahum Tate	16 October 1783	Fontainebleau
Le dormeur éveillé	opéra comique	2 acts	Jean-François Marmontel	14 November 1783	Paris, Comédie Italienne
Le faux Lord	opéra comique	2 acts	Giuseppe Maria Piccinni	6 December 1783	Versailles
Diane et Endymion	opéra	3 acts	Jean-François Espic Chevalier de Liroux	7 September 1784	Paris, Académie Royale
Lucette	opéra comique		Giuseppe Maria Piccinni	30 December 1784	Paris, Comédie Italienne
Pénélope	tragédie lyrique	3 acts	Jean-François Marmontel	2 November 1785	Fontainebleau, Hoftheater; 2nd version: 16 October 1787, Paris, Académie Royale
Adèle de Ponthieu (2nd version)	tragédie lyrique	3 acts		revised 1785 but unperformed	
Clytemnestre	tragédie lyrique		Louis-Guillaume Pitra	composed 1787, but unperformed	
La serva onorata	opera buffa		Giovanni Battista Lorenzi, after Le nozze di Figaro by Lorenzo Da Ponte	Carnival? 1792	Naples, Teatro dei Fiorentini
Le trame in maschera	opera buffa			Carnival 1793	Naples, Teatro dei Fiorentini
Ercole al Termodonte (or: La disfatta delle Amazzone)	opera seria	2 acts	Antonio Simone Sografi	12 January 1793	Naples, Teatro San Carlo
La Griselda	dramma eroicomico	2 acts	Angelo Anelli, after Giovanni Boccaccio	8 October 1793	Venice, Teatro San Samuele
Il servo padrone, ossia L'amor perfetto	opera buffa	2 acts	Caterino Mazzolà	17 January 1794	Venice, Teatro San Samuele
