= Siroe =

Siroe or Siroe re di Persia (Siroes, King of Persia) may refer to:

- Siroe (Metastasio), libretto by Pietro Metastasio
- Siroe (Handel), opera by George Frideric Handel
- Siroe (Hasse), opera by Johann Adolph Hasse
- Siroe (Errichelli), opera by Pasquale Errichelli

== See also ==
- Kavad II (Sheroe)
- Sheroe (disambiguation)
