= Siroe (Metastasio) =

Libretto by Pietro Metastasio

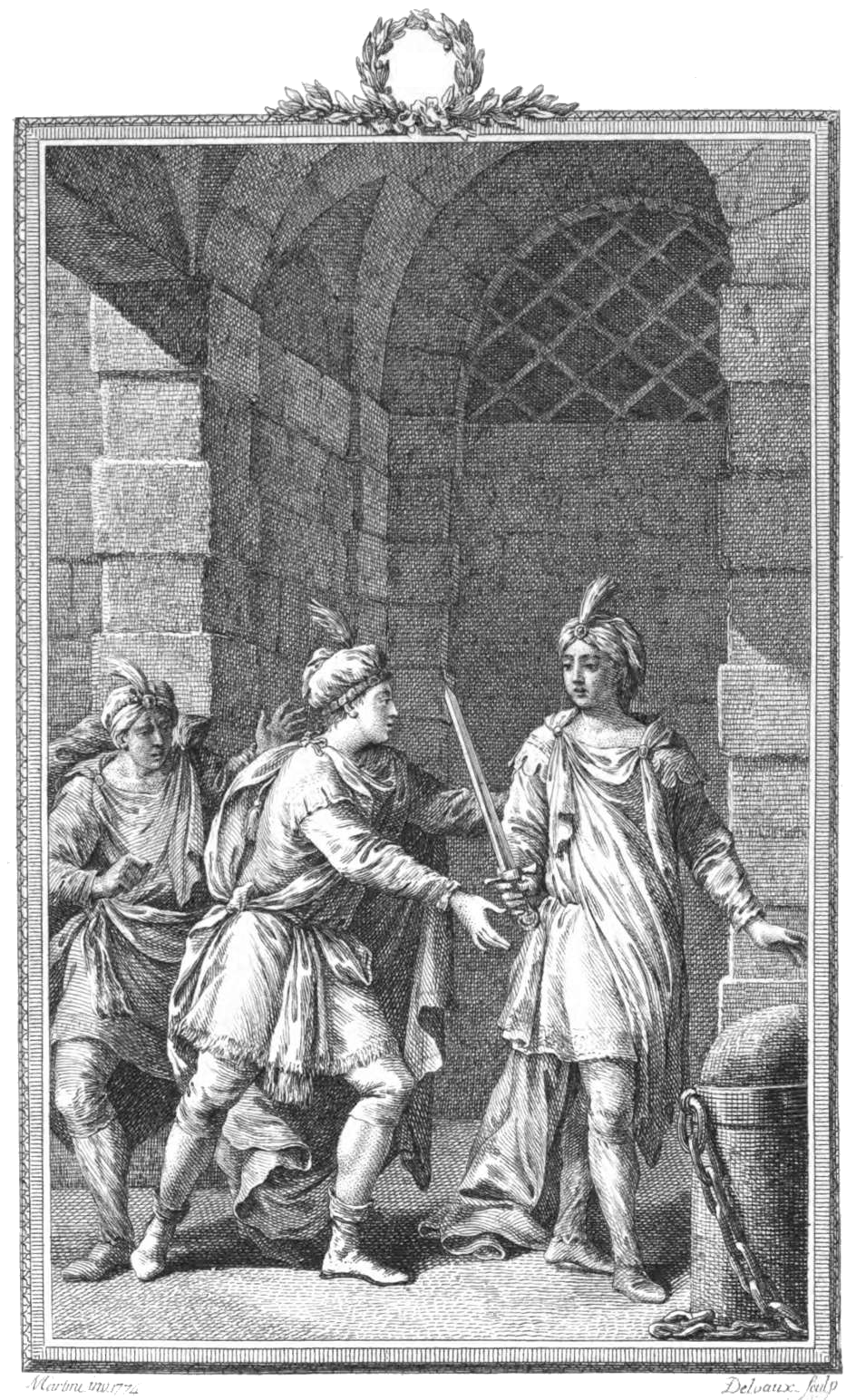
Metastasio - Siroe re di Persia - Herissant Vol.03 - Paris 1780

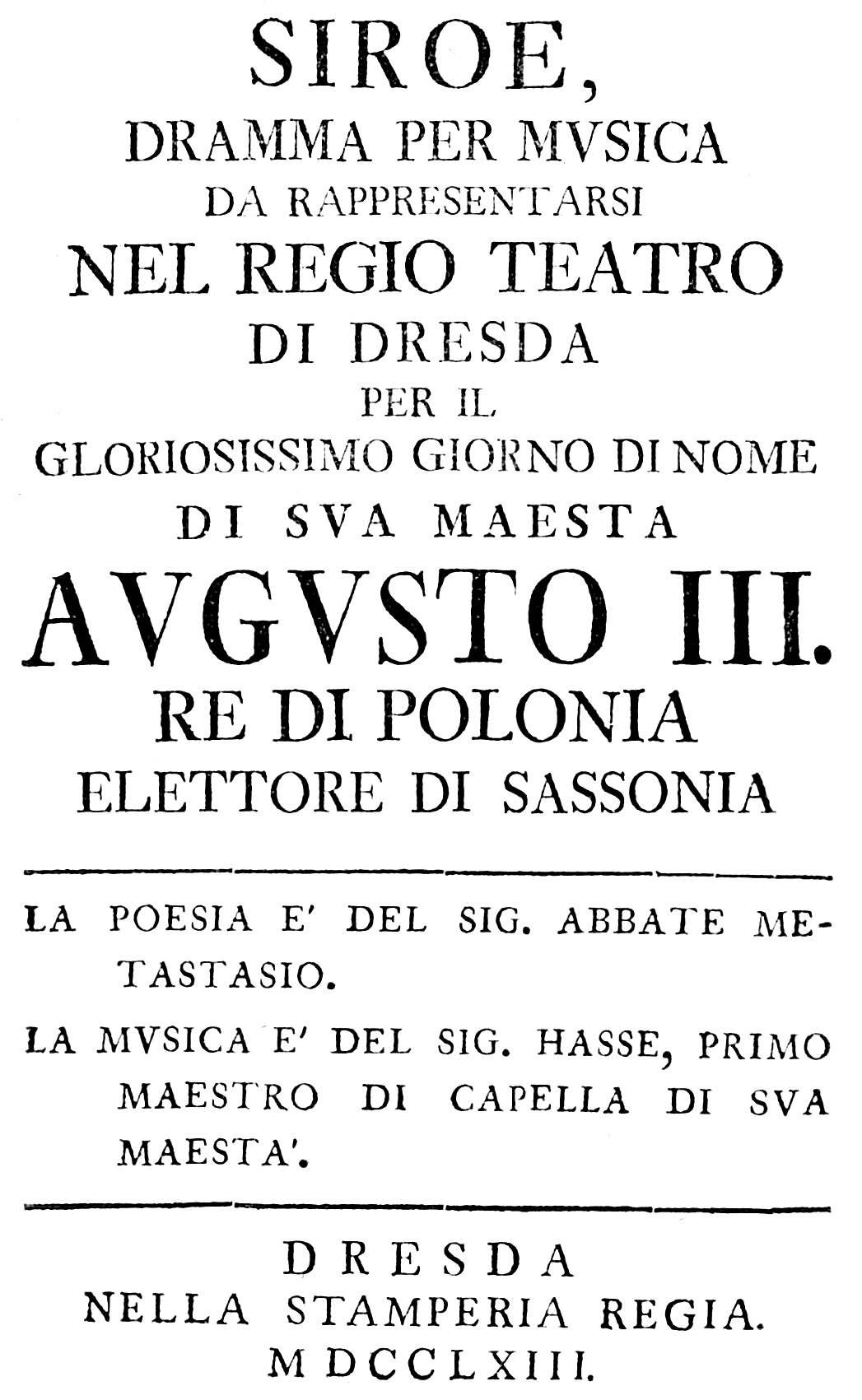
Johann Adolph Hasse - Siroe re di Persia - Italian titlepage of the libretto - Dresden 1763

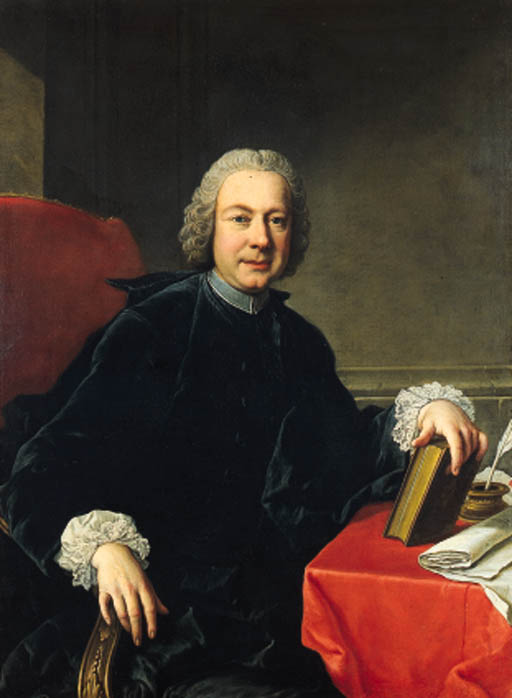
Portrait of Metastasio by Batoni

Siroe re di Persia is a libretto in three acts by Pietro Metastasio. Set to music by Leonardo Vinci, it was first performed on 2 February 1726 at the Teatro San Giovanni Grisostomo, Venice. It was subsequently set to music at least 35 times by different composers.

== Action ==
The action is set in Selucia in the year 628. The characters are:

- Cosroe (Khosrow II), King of Persia
- Siroe (Kavad II), his oldest son
- Medarse, his second son
- Emira, Princess of Cambaia, lover of Siroe disguised in men's clothing as Idaspe
- Laodice, lover of Siroe, sister of Arasse
- Arasse, General and friend of Siroe

The plot concerns the Persian king Cosroe, who wants to appoint his second son Medarse as his successor instead of his first-born son Siroe and thus arouses popular anger. The background to these events is that Cosroe had previously defeated his opponent Asbite, king of Cambaia, and had his family murdered. Only Asbite's daughter Emira survived to plan her revenge. For this purpose, she has disguised herself as a man and found her way into Cosroe's court under the assumed name of Idaspe. Only her lover, Cosroe's son Siroe, knows her true identity.

The following plot summary is based on the second version of the setting by Johann Adolph Hasse, performed in Dresden in 1763. (Note: Italian/German libretto of Hasse's setting at the Staatsbibliothek zu Berlin.)

=== Act 1 ===
A large temple dedicated to the Sun

Cosroe has called his sons to the temple of the sun to appoint his successor. Before he announces his choice, he extracts an oath from both of them to recognize his decision and keep the peace. His younger son Medarse is convinced that the choice will fall on him and immediately obeys. Siroe, however, refuses and accuses his father of preferring Medarse. As expected, Medarse is appointed heir. Emira arrives, disguised as Idaspe. In order to speak to Siroe alone, she sends Medarse away. Then she advises Siroe to call the people for support. In addition, as the price of her love, she demands that he assist her in killing his father. Cosroe's mistress arrives - Laodice, who is secretly in love with Siroe. After Emira/Idaspe leaves the temple, Laodice asks Siroe to finally confess his love. However, he points to her relationship with Cosroe and indicates that there is another obstacle that he cannot yet reveal. Finally, he confesses to being in love with another and advises her to forget him.

Laodice feels scorned and swears vengeance on Siroe. She decides to ask for help from her brother Arasse, a friend of Siroe's. Arasse tells her about the impending popular uprising over the choice of Medarse as heir. He asks Laodice to speak to Cosroe on Siroe's behalf. She refuses but Arasse is not willing to forfeit his friendship with Siroe.

Cosroe's inner room

Siroe wants to warn his father about Emira/Idaspe's revenge plan, but in order not to reveal his lover's identity, he writes an anonymous letter. As Cosroe arrives, he hides. Laodice also arrives and complains to Cosroe that Siroe has forced his attentions on her. Outraged, Cosroe sits down and finds Siroe's letter. Medarse also comes into the room. Cosroe reads the letter to him, warning of a traitor who is one of his best friends. Medarse now claims that he wrote the letter himself and that the traitor was none other than Siroe, who he says wanted his help to murder their father. Siroe leaves his hiding place and accuses Medarse of lying. Finally, Emira/Idaspe also comes in and learns about the content of the letter. Siroe continues to refuse to name the traitor and is now accused by Emira/Idaspe. Siroe complains that he cannot prove his innocence and leaves the room. Cosroe is unsure whether he can trust Idaspe. Medarse and Laodice express disappointment at Siroe's behavior. Unexpectedly, Emira/Idaspe now defends it. Laodice is confused about Emira's/Idaspe's behavior, but Medarse believes that his intrigues will soon lead to his achieving his goal.

=== Act 2 ===
The royal zoo

Laodice regrets her actions, apologizes to Siroe and promises to speak to Cosroe to retract her false accusations. Siroe rejects this because it would only arouse suspicion. He just wants her to stop loving him. She leaves.

Now Emira comes and accuses Siroe of infidelity and cowardice for not telling his father about her plan. She thinks that as children of enemies they should also be enemies. He should therefore have warned his father about her. Since she does not want to renounce her planned revenge, he pulls out his sword to kill himself. At that moment, Cosroe arrives and mistakenly thinks Siroe has drawn his sword against Idaspe. Siroe declares himself guilty of this and asks his father to end his life. When Emira/Idaspe points out that he has not yet disclosed the name of the conspirator, Siroe explains that it might even be Idaspe himself. However, Cosroe doesn't believe him and has him led away. With Cosroe now lost in thought about his son, Emira sees an opportunity to attack him and pulls out her own sword. However, she is interrupted by Medarse and talks herself out of the situation by laying her sword at Cosroe's feet. Cosroe feels honored and asks Emira/Idaspe to take the sword back and look for the traitor. She leaves.

Medarse reports to Cosroe that Siroe has already drawn the people to his side. The only solution now is to kill him. Since Cosroe rejects this, Medarse suggests that Siroe be appointed king in his place. Cosroe no longer doubts Siroe's guilt, but also cannot bring himself to punish him.

A room near the zoo

Arasse urges Siroe to act but he refuses to do so. Arasse in any case swears allegiance to him and leaves. Cosroe and Emira/Idaspe come into the room. Cosroe wants to talk to Siroe alone. He has the room locked and sends Emira/Idaspe away, who nevertheless eavesdrops on their conversation. Cosroe tries everything possible to get Siroe to talk. He is ready to forgive him for wanting to seduce Laodice, seeking Idaspe's death and planning an uprising if only he will divulge the name of the traitor. Only when he declares that he also wants to forgive the traitor too does Siroe begin to speak but he is interrupted by Emira/Idaspe. Cosroe now offers Siroe to marry him to Laodice, but Siroe declares his revulsion for her. Now Cosroe thinks Siroe wants his death and asks him to kill him – but Siroe does not wish to do that either. Cosroe now has Laodice brought and gives Siroe an ultimatum: if he tells Idaspe the traitor's name, he will be named heir and have Laodice. Otherwise, a dungeon awaits him. After Cosroe leaves, Emira/Idaspe mocks Siroe's planned union with Laodice. Siroe replies that Idaspe should decide for him and leaves.

Emira/Idaspe then declares to Laodice that she/he is in love with her. Laodice asks Idaspe to change Siroe's mind as a sign of love. Emira/Idaspe refuses, and Laodice angrily leaves the room. Emira vacillates between her desire for revenge and her love for Siroe.

=== Act 3 ===
Palace courtyard

Cosroe orders Arasse to kill Siroe. Arasse tries to change his mind, not believing that this will pacify the people. However, Cosroe is determined and Arasse finally agrees to carry out the order. Laodice tells Cosroe that the people are asking for Siroe. Cosroe tells her about the order to kill him. Laodice now admits that she wrongly accused Siroe of attempting to rape her because he did not return her love. She asks him to keep Siroe alive, but Cosroe will not change his mind.

Emira/Idaspe also begs Cosroe for mercy for Siroe and reminds him that Siroe was always an exemplary son. Her appeal succeeds and Cosroe gives her his seal as a sign of authority to stop the killing. Arasse returns and announces that Siroe is already dead. Emira/Idaspe reproaches Cosroe and now reveals himself as Emira, surrendering her sword to Arasse. As she is led away, Cosroe remains inconsolable.

Locked prison cell in the fortress

Emira asks Arasse to kill her, but he confesses to her that he has only faked the death of Siroe, who is still alive. He asks Emira to hide for a while until he has called the people together, when Siroe will be hers. He then leaves.

Medarse enters the dungeon and finds Emira there. Because he does not yet know her true identity, she shows him the royal seal as proof of the king's trust in her. When Medarse explains that he wants to kill Siroe, Emira/Idaspe tells him that he is already dead. In order to be certain however, Medarse wants to see the body. Emira decides to trick him and offers to help. Siroe then appears. Medarse draws the sword, but is filled with remorse and hands the weapon to Emira/Idaspe to kill Siroe. She however hands it to Siroe and reveals to Medarse her identity as Emira. Arasse arrives with his guards and reports that the people have chosen Siroe as king. He leaves and Emira follows him. With no supporters left, Medarse finally gives up. Siroe, however, generously forgives his brother and returns his weapon. Medarse, left alone, reflects on the value of virtue.

Large square in Seleukia

The royal guard has been defeated in a final battle against the rebels. Cosroe, Emira and Siroe enter one after the other, followed by Arasse and the people. Cosroe is still defending himself against some of the conspirators. Emira tries to take her revenge on him, but Siroe stops her. Cosroe is happy to see his son alive again. Medarse and Laodice ask Cosroe to punish them for their offenses. Siroe explains that he is not angry with anyone and also asks Emira to forget her hatred. Only on these terms can he accept her as a lover. Emira eventually gives up her revenge and Cosroe gives her to Siroe in marriage, declaring him king. The opera ends with a chorus.

== Background ==
The historical basis for the drama is the deposition of the Persian king Khosrow II by his son Kavad II, recounted in the fourth volume of Epitome Historion by the Byzantine historian Johannes Zonaras as well as in the first book of Historia saracenica by the Christian Arab historian George Elmacin (Ibn al-’Amid) and the eleventh volume of the Annales ecclesiastici by Cesare Baronio. These in turn are based on the Chronographia of Theophanes. Contemporary sources available to Metastasio may also have included Cosroès by Jean Rotrou (1649) and the libretto Ormisda by Apostolo Zeno (1721). The latter follows a similar plot, although its action takes place a generation earlier in the Sassanid dynasty.

The first setting of Metastasio's libretto was by Leonardo Vinci, which premiered on 2 February 1726 at Teatro San Giovanni Crisostomo in Venice. The principal roles were sung by Marianna Bulgarelli (known as “La Romanina“) as Emira and Nicolò Grimaldi (“Nicolini“) as Siroe. (They were the same two stars who had previously led the cast of Didone abbandonata in 1724.) The castrato Giovanni Carestini sang the role of Medarse. In Davide Perez's 1740 setting, the singers were Caffarelli as Siroe and Giovanni Manzuoli as Medarse.

== Settings to music ==
The following composers used this libretto as the basis for an opera:

Year	Composer	Premiere	First performed
1726	Leonardo Vinci	2 February 1726, Teatro San Giovanni Crisostomo Also at Carnival 1728 at the Teatro su la via Nuova in Verona	Venice
1726	Giovanni Porta	3 July 1726, Teatro Cocomero Also on 26 December 1726 at the Teatro Regio Ducale in Milan.	Florence
1727	Domenico Sarro	25 January 1727, Teatro San Bartolomeo	Naples
1727	Nicola Antonio Porpora	11 February 1727, Teatro delle Dame (Note: Italian libretto of Porpora's setting at the Museo internazionale e biblioteca della musica.) Also in 1733 in Perugia; Carnival 1738 at the Teatro dell’Accademia dei Remoti in Faenza	Rome
1727	Antonio Vivaldi	29 April 1727, Teatro Pubblico RV 735; Also summer 1738 at the Teatro La Fenice in Ancona and Carnival 1739 at the Teatro Bonacossi in Ferrara	Reggio Emilia
1728	Georg Friedrich Händel → Siroe	17 February 1728, King's Theatre am Haymarket (Note: Italian libretto of Händel's setting at the Munich Digitization Center.) HWV 24; Also at the summer fair 1730 at the Hoftheater in Brunswick	London
1729	de:Andrea Stefano Fiorè	26 December 1729, Teatro Regio	Turin
1731	Giovanni Battista Pescetti with Baldassare Galuppi and Leonardo Vinci	27 January 1731, Teatro San Giovanni Crisostomo (Note: Italian libretto of Pescetti's setting at Museo internazionale e biblioteca della musica.) Libretto adapted by Giovanni Boldini	Venice
1732	Antonio Bioni	4 February 1732, Theater im Ballhaus	Breslau
1733	Johann Adolph Hasse → Siroe (Hasse)	2 May 1733, Teatro Malvezzi first version; many other productions in other Italian cities.	Bologna
1740	Gaetano Latilla	Carnival 1740, Teatro delle Dame (Note: Italian libretto of Latilla's setting at the Museo internazionale e biblioteca della musica.) Also at the June fair 1753 at the Teatro degli Obizzi in Padua	Rome
1740	Davide Perez	4 November 1740, Teatro San Carlo	Naples
1742	Giuseppe Scarlatti	24 April 1742, Teatro della Pergola Also Carnival 1747 at the Teatro San Sebastiano in Livorno; Carnival 1750 at the Teatro Regio in Turin	Florence
1743	Gennaro Manna	9 February 1743, Teatro San Giovanni Crisostomo	Venice
1743	de:Paolo Scalabrini	1743, Theater im Ballhaus Also on 14 December 1743 at the Oper am Gänsemarkt in Hamburg; Carnival 1744 at the Nuovo Teatro in Prague and 1749 at the Kongelige Teater in Copenhagen.	Linz
1746	Antonio Maria Mazzoni	2 July 1746, Teatro della Fortuna (Note: Italian libretto of Mazzoni's setting at the Museo internazionale e biblioteca della musica.)	Fano
1748	Georg Christoph Wagenseil	4 October 1748, Burgtheater	Vienna
1749	Gioacchino Cocchi	26 December 1749, Teatro San Giovanni Crisostomo	Venice
1751	anonymous	1751, Teatro de la Santa Cruz (Note: Italian/Spanish libretto (anonymous).) Other productions by anonymous composers, or pasticcio versions on 4 May 1759 at the Teatro San Samuele in Venice and 13 December 1763 at the King's Theatre in London	Barcelona
1752	Francesco Antonio Uttini	1752, Oper am Gänsemarkt	Hamburg
1752	Nicola Conforto	30 May 1752, Real Teatro del Buen Retiro (Note: Italian/Spanish libretto of Conforto's setting.)	Madrid
1753	Francesco Poncini Zilioli	Carnival 1753, Teatro Ducale	Parma
1754	Baldassare Galuppi	10 February 1754, Teatro Argentina (Note: Italian libretto of Galuppi's setting at the Internet Archive.)	Rome
1755	Giovanni Battista Lampugnani	14 January 1755, King's Theatre Also Carnival 1759 at the Teatro Omodeo in Pavia	London
1758	Pasquale Errichelli → Siroe (Errichelli)	26 December 1758, Teatro San Carlo	Naples
1759	Niccolò Piccinni	1759 adapted by Giuseppe Brunetti 15 August 1759 at the Teatro della Pergola in Florence	Naples
1760	Hermann Friedrich Raupach	1760, Hoftheater	Sankt Petersburg
1760	Giovanni Battista Cedronio	presumably 1760	
1763	Johann Adolph Hasse → Siroe (Hasse)	Carnival 1763, Hoftheater second version; composed winter 1762/63 in Warsaw	Dresden
1764	Antonio Boroni	1764, Teatro San Salvatore	Venice
1764	Pietro Alessandro Guglielmi	5 September 1764, Teatro della Pergola (Note: Italian libretto of the setting by Guglielmi at the Museo internazionale e biblioteca della musica.) also 26 December 1764 at the Teatro Regio Ducale in Mailan	Florence
1766	Antonio Tozzi	1766–67	Brunswick
1767	Tommaso Traetta	Carnival 1767, Hoftheater (Note: Italian/German libretto of the setting by Traetta at the Munich Digitization Center.)	Munich
1770	Carlo Franchi	13 February 1770, Teatro Argentina (Note: Italian libretto of Franchi's setting at the Museo internazionale e biblioteca della musica.)	Rome
1771	de:Giovanni Battista Borghi	Carnival 1771, Teatro San Benedetto	Venice
1779	Giuseppe Sarti	26 December 1779, Teatro Regio (Note: Italian libretto of the setting by Sarti at the Munich Digitization Center.)	Turin
1783	Luigi Guido Beltrami	1783, Collegio Vescovile	Verona
1810	Carlo Ubaldi	around 1810	Turin

== Modern performances and recordings ==
- Georg Friedrich Händel:
  - December 1925: German language performance in Gera.
  - 1962 and 1963: Performances at the Händel-Festspiele Halle, Orchester des Landestheaters Halle
  - September 1989: CD recording, Brewer Baroque Chamber Orchestra.
  - December 2000 and January 2001: Performances in the Scuola Grande de San Giovanni Evangelista in Venice, Venice Baroque Orchestra.
  - May 2003: Performances at the Grace Episcopal Church in Chicago.
  - May 2003: Performances in Cologne (CD recording available), Capella Coloniensis.
  - January 2004: Concert performances at the Théâtre des Champs-Élysées Paris and the Arsenal de Metz, Venice Baroque Orchestra.
  - February and April 2004: Performances in Berkeley and in the Brooklyn Academy of Music Harvey Theater, Venice Baroque Orchestra.
  - October/November 2007: Productions at the Teo Otto Theater Remscheid and the Schauspielhaus Wuppertal.
  - October 2009: Performance at the Stadttheater Neuburg
  - June 2010: Performance from the Händel-Festspiele Halle at the Goethe-Theater Bad Lauchstädt.
  - May 2013: Performance (Available on CD) at the de:Deutsches Theater Göttingen, FestspielOrchester Göttingen.
- Johann Adolph Hasse:
  - September 2008: Performance at St. Giles Church in London, Ensemble Serse.
  - June 2009: Performance at the Savile Club in London, Ensemble Serse.
  - November 2014: CD recording, Armonia Atenea.
  - December 2017: Performances at the Oldenburgisches Staatstheater, Oldenburgisches Staatsorchester.
