= Gregorio Babbi =

Italian opera singer

Gregorio Babbi (6 November 1708, Cesena – 2 January 1768, Cesena) was an Italian operatic tenor. He performed in the premieres of numerous operas, including works by Girolamo Abos, Pietro Auletta, Andrea Bernasconi, Giuseppe de Majo, Giuseppe Ferdinando Brivio, Pasquale Cafaro, Gioacchino Cocchi, Nicola Conforto, Pasquale Errichelli, Baldassare Galuppi, Giuseppe Gazzaniga, Geminiano Giacomelli, Giovanni Antonio Giay, Johann Adolph Hasse, Niccolò Jommelli, Gaetano Latilla, Leonardo Leo, Gennaro Manna, Antonio Maria Mazzoni, Davide Perez, Niccolò Piccinni, Nicola Sabatino, Giuseppe Scarlatti, Tommaso Traetta and Antonio Vivaldi among others.
