= Iphigénie en Tauride (Piccinni) =

Tragédie lyrique in four acts by Niccolò Piccinni

- Tragédie lyrique by Niccolò Piccinni
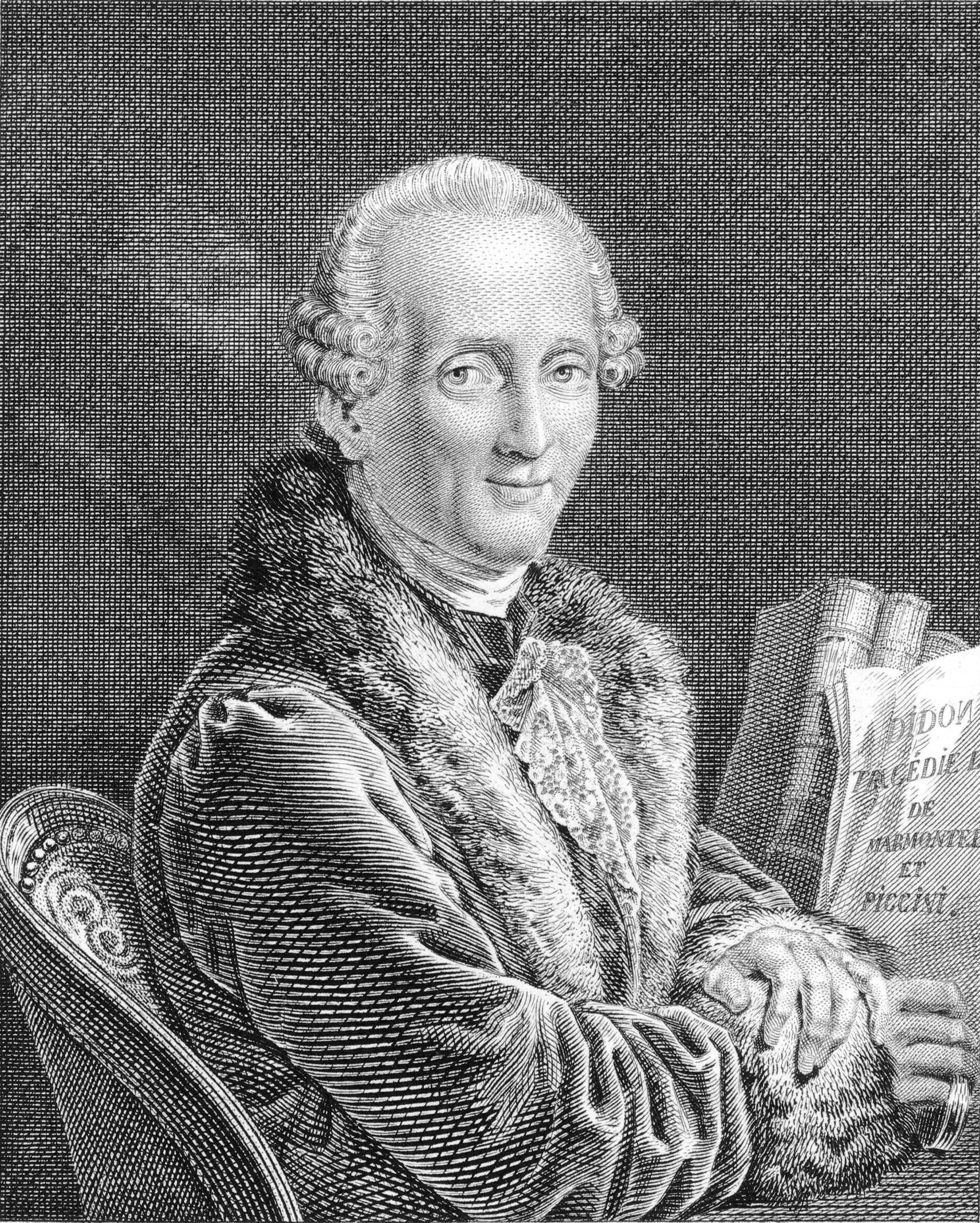
- Niccolò Piccinni, engraving by Hippolyte Pauquet
- Librettist: Alphonse du Congé Dubreuil
- Language: French
- Based on: Play by Claude Guimond de La Touche, after Iphigeneia in Tauris
- Premiere: 28 January 1781; Salle du Palais-Royal, Paris

Iphigénie en Tauride (Iphigeneia in Tauris) is a tragédie lyrique in four acts by Niccolò Piccinni, which was first performed on 23 January 1781 by the Académie royale de musique (the Paris Opéra) in the second Salle du Palais-Royal. The opera's libretto, by Alphonse du Congé Dubreuil, is based on a play of the same name by Claude Guimond de La Touche, although the ultimate source was the tragedy Iphigeneia in Tauris by Euripides.

== Background ==
Iphigénie en Tauride marked the climax of the quarrel between the supporters of Piccinni and those of Christoph Willibald Gluck. Piccinni had been brought to Paris in the mid-1770s as a rival to the German composer, who had already had great success with his operas there. Arguments about the respective merits of their heroes raged between "Gluckists" and "Piccinnists", although the composers themselves showed less enthusiasm for the fight. When Gluck learned that Piccinni was setting the same libretto to Roland as he was, he abandoned work on his score. For his part, Piccinni was an admirer of Gluck's music and was reluctant to challenge him. Nevertheless, in 1778 the director of the Paris Opéra, Jacques de Vismes du Valgay, finally succeeded in arranging a direct confrontation when he persuaded both composers to write an opera on the same story, but not the same libretto: Iphigénie en Tauride.

Piccinni accepted on the condition that his version would be staged first. In the event, problems with the quality of the libretto (and, possibly, backstage political manoeuvrings) meant that Gluck's opera was the first to receive its premiere in May 1779. Gluck's Iphigénie en Tauride was immediately acclaimed as a masterpiece. The success of his rival caused Piccinni to delay his own opera even further and it was not until a year and a half later that it was finally presented to a Parisian audience. The reaction was lukewarm, although a revival in 1785 was received more favourably.

== Roles ==
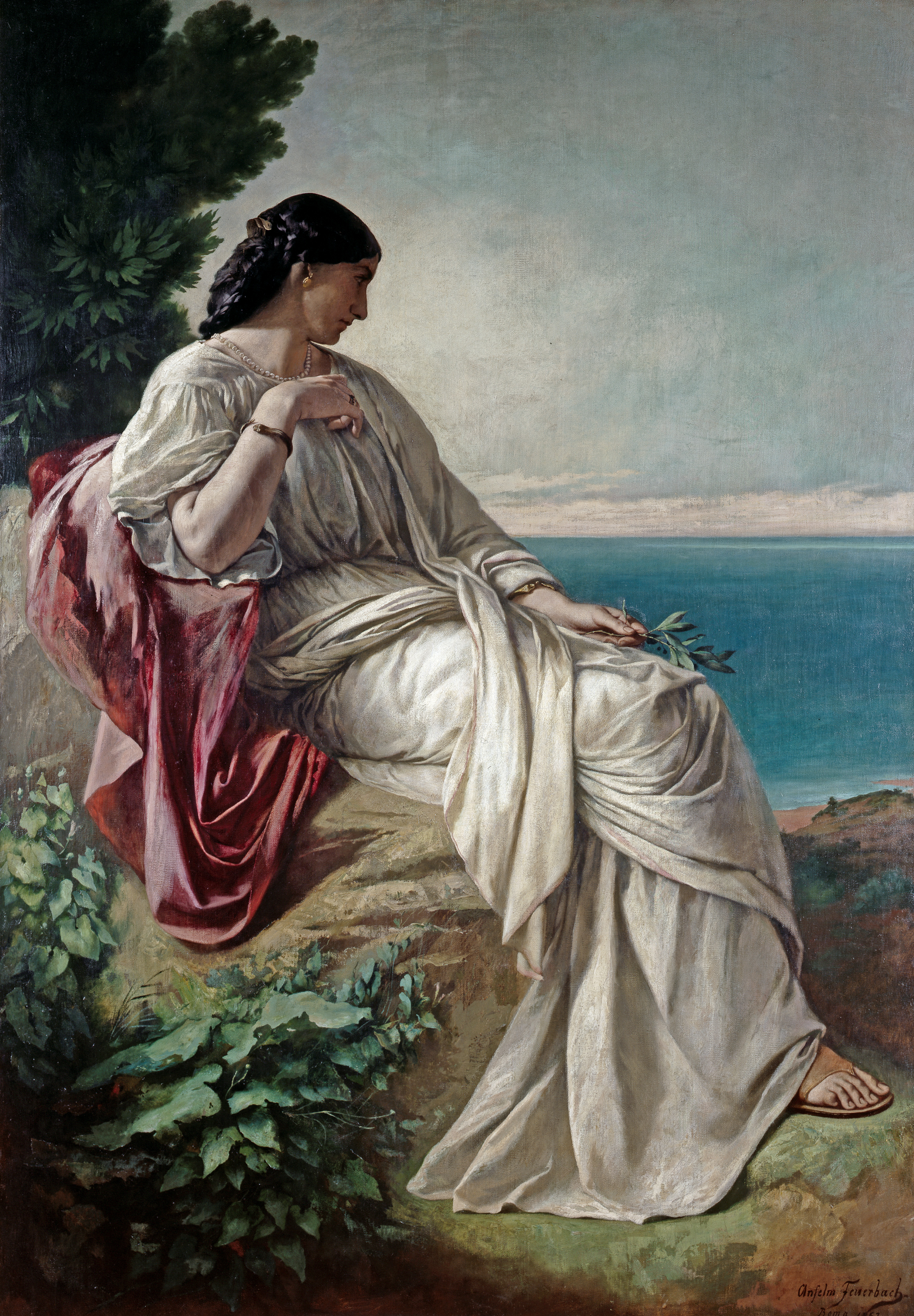
Iphigenie (1862) by Anselm Feuerbach

Role	Voice type	Premiere Cast: 23 January 1781 (Conductor: Jean-Baptiste Rey)
Iphigénie (Iphigeneia), Priestess of Diana	soprano	Marie-Joséphine Laguerre
Oreste (Orestes)	basse-taille (bass-baritone)	Henri Larrivée
Pylade (Pylades)	haute-contre	Joseph Legros
Thoas, King of Scythia	basse-taille (bass-baritone)	Moreau
Elise, a confidante of Iphigénie	soprano	Suzanne Joinville
A Scythian	tenor	Étienne Lainez
A Scythian woman	soprano	Anne-Marie-Jeanne Gavaudan, l'ainée (the elder)
Another Scythian	tenor/baritone	François Lays
Diane (Diana)	soprano	Mlle Chateauvieux
Priestesses	sopranos	Mlles Rozalie, Audinot, Deslions, Thaunat, Dubuisson, Josephine
Scythian people	sopranos/?	Mlle Chateauvieux, Gertrude Girardin; Messieurs Blery and Royer

== Synopsis ==
The plot is very similar to that of Gluck's opera. The main difference is that in Piccinni's version King Thoas is in love with Iphigénie and is consequently a less "barbaric" character.

== Recording ==
- Iphigénie en Tauride, Soloists, Chorus and Orchestra of the Teatro Petruzzelli, Bari, conducted by Donato Renzetti (Fonit Cetra, 1986) (a recording of the first modern revival)
