= Siroe (Handel) =

Opera seria in three acts by George Frideric Handel

George Frideric Handel

Siroe, re di Persia (Siroes, King of Persia, HWV 24), is an opera seria in three acts by George Frideric Handel. It was his 12th opera for the Royal Academy of Music and was written for the sopranos Francesca Cuzzoni and Faustina Bordoni. The opera uses an Italian-language libretto by Nicola Francesco Haym, after Metastasio's Siroe. Like many of Metastasio's libretti, it was also set by Handel's contemporaries, e.g. by Leonardo Vinci, Antonio Vivaldi and Johann Adolph Hasse (see Hasse's Siroe). Pasquale Errichelli's setting of the libretto (see Errichelli's Siroe) premiered in the year of Handel's death.

The story of the opera is a fictionalisation of some events in the life of Kavad II (also known as Shērōē), King of the Sasanian Empire in 628 AD.

== Performance history ==
The opera was first given under the direction of the composer at the King's Theatre in London on 17 February 1728 and it was also seen in Braunschweig, Germany. It was rediscovered and performed in Gera, Germany, in December 1925. As with all Baroque opera seria, Siroe went unperformed for many years, but with the revival of interest in Baroque music and historically informed musical performance since the 1960s, Siroe, like all Handel operas, receives performances at festivals and opera houses today. Among other performances, Siroe received staged productions at the Scuola Grande di San Giovanni Evangelista in Venice in association with La Fenice opera house in 2001 and at the Göttingen International Handel Festival in 2013.

== Roles ==
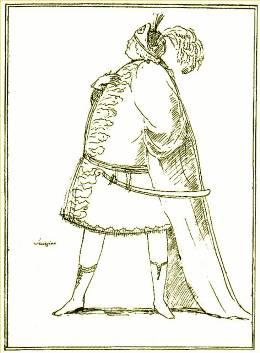
Caricature of Senesino, who created the role of Siroe

Roles, voice types, and premiere cast
Role	Voice type	Premiere cast, 17 February 1728
Emira, daughter of Asbite, King of Cambaya, and Siroe's lover	soprano	Faustina Bordoni
Laodice, Cosroe's mistress and Arasse's sister	soprano	Francesca Cuzzoni
Siroe, older son of Cosroe	alto castrato	Francesco Bernardi, called "Senesino"
Medarse, younger son of Cosroe	alto castrato	Antonio Baldi
Cosroe, King of Persia	bass	Giuseppe Maria Boschi
Arasse, Cosroe's general and confidante of Siroe	bass	Giovanni Battista Palmerini

== Synopsis ==
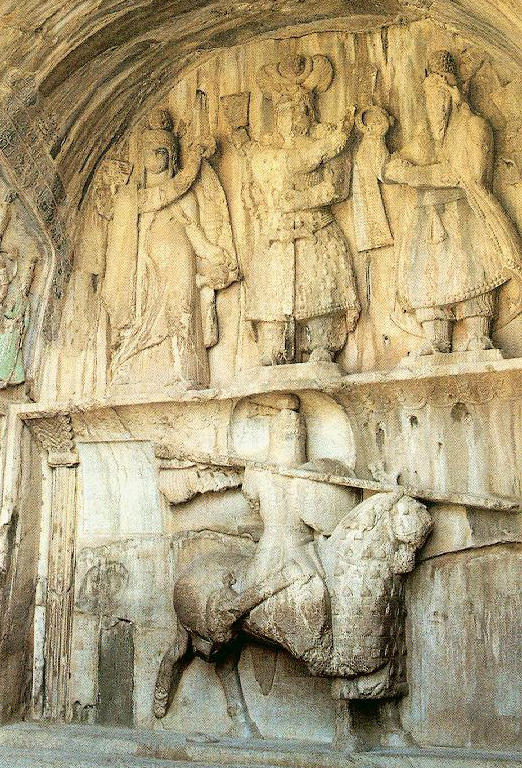
Relief from Persia at the time Siroe is set. The figure in the middle at the top is the King called "Cosroe" in the opera

- Scene: Persia, about 628 AD.

Before the action begins, King Cosroe has had Asbite, father of Emira, assassinated. Emira has disguised herself as a man, "Idaspe", and has come to King Cosroe's court, thirsting for revenge for her father's death. There she has fallen in love with the heir to the throne, Siroe, and he, aware of her true identity, with her also. Cosroe's younger son Prince Medarse wants to get rid of both his father and his older brother so that he can have the throne himself. Laodice, the king's mistress, has also fallen in love with crown prince Siroe.

=== Act 1 ===
Siroe, the upright crown prince of Persia, is aware of the machinations surrounding him and rejects both Emira's plots for revenge for her father's death and Laodice's desire for his love. Siroe discovers that the two ladies and his brother Medarse are conspiring to kill Cosroe and warns the King in an anonymous letter that there are plots against his life, without however naming the conspirators. Siroe is identified as the author of the letter, but still refuses to name the conspirators. The jealous Laodice accuses Siroe of making unwanted sexual advances to her and the King announces that the succession to the throne will pass over Siroe and go to the younger Medarse instead, which makes both ladies feel guilty although Medarse rejoices.

=== Act 2 ===
Siroe bewails his fate. Accused of treachery by his father, constantly badgered by the unwanted attentions of Laodice and continually pressed to revenge her father's death by his sweetheart Emira, Siroe draws his sword to commit suicide in front of the disguised Emira, but the King entering at this moment believes Siroe is attempting to murder "Idaspe" and has Siroe arrested. Emira is attempting to assassinate the King when Medarse prevents this. Emira talks her way out of the King's suspicions. The King orders Siroe to reveal the names of the conspirators who are plotting against him or be put to death and Siroe chooses to die rather than reveal their names. Laodice implores "Idaspe" to use "his" influence with the King to prevent Siroe's execution.

=== Act 3 ===
The people are in revolt at the news of the impending execution of the popular crown prince Siroe. Laodice confesses to the King that her stories about Siroe molesting her were lies. She is joined by Emira in begging the King to spare Siroe's life and the King's memories of his son's childhood soften his attitude toward Siroe. The commander of the army, Arasse, brings the false news that Siroe has been put to death. Emira, beside herself with grief and anger, reveals her true identity to the King and that she, not Siroe, was plotting the King's assassination. Arasse informs Emira that Siroe is actually still living and Emira then forestalls an attempt by Medarse to kill his father the King and claim the throne for himself. Rebels have stormed the palace and are threatening the King when Siroe enters and drives them away. Siroe forgives his brother Medarse and implores Emira to drop her hatred. Siroe and Emira will marry, the King abdicates and Siroe will now be crowned King of Persia. All celebrate the fortunate outcome of events.

== Context and analysis ==
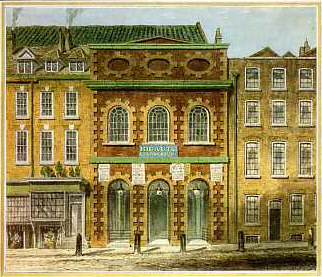
The King's Theatre, London, where Siroe had its first performance

The German-born Handel, after spending some of his early career composing operas and other pieces in Italy, settled in London, where in 1711 he had brought Italian opera for the first time with his opera Rinaldo. A tremendous success, Rinaldo created a craze in London for Italian opera seria, a form focused overwhelmingly on solo arias for the star virtuoso singers. In 1719, Handel was appointed music director of an organisation called the Royal Academy of Music (unconnected with the present day London conservatoire), a company under royal charter to produce Italian operas in London. Handel was not only to compose operas for the company but hire the star singers, supervise the orchestra and musicians, and adapt operas from Italy for London performance.

Handel had composed numerous Italian operas for the Academy, with varying degrees of success; some were enormously popular. The castrato Senesino and the soprano Francesca Cuzzoni had appeared in a succession of Handel operas for the Academy (he was not the only composer who composed operas for the company) most of which had been successful with audiences, and in 1726 the directors of the Academy brought over another internationally renowned singer, Faustina Bordoni, to add to the company's attractions. The two prima donnas had appeared in continental European countries in operas together without incident, but in London they developed rival groups of fans that interrupted the performances with rowdy displays of partisanship for one lady or another. This came to a climax on 6 June 1727 during a performance at the King's Theatre of Astianatte by Giovanni Bononcini with both singers onstage and royalty (thirteen-year-old Princess Caroline) in the audience. Fist fights and disorder between rival groups of fans broke out in the audience and the two sopranos exchanged insults and came to blows onstage. The rest of the opera was cut, the performers going straight to the short final chorus, and the scandal was gleefully repeated in the newspapers, in satirical skits on other stages, and in mock-heroic verse, bringing the entire form of Italian opera into a certain amount of disrepute in London.

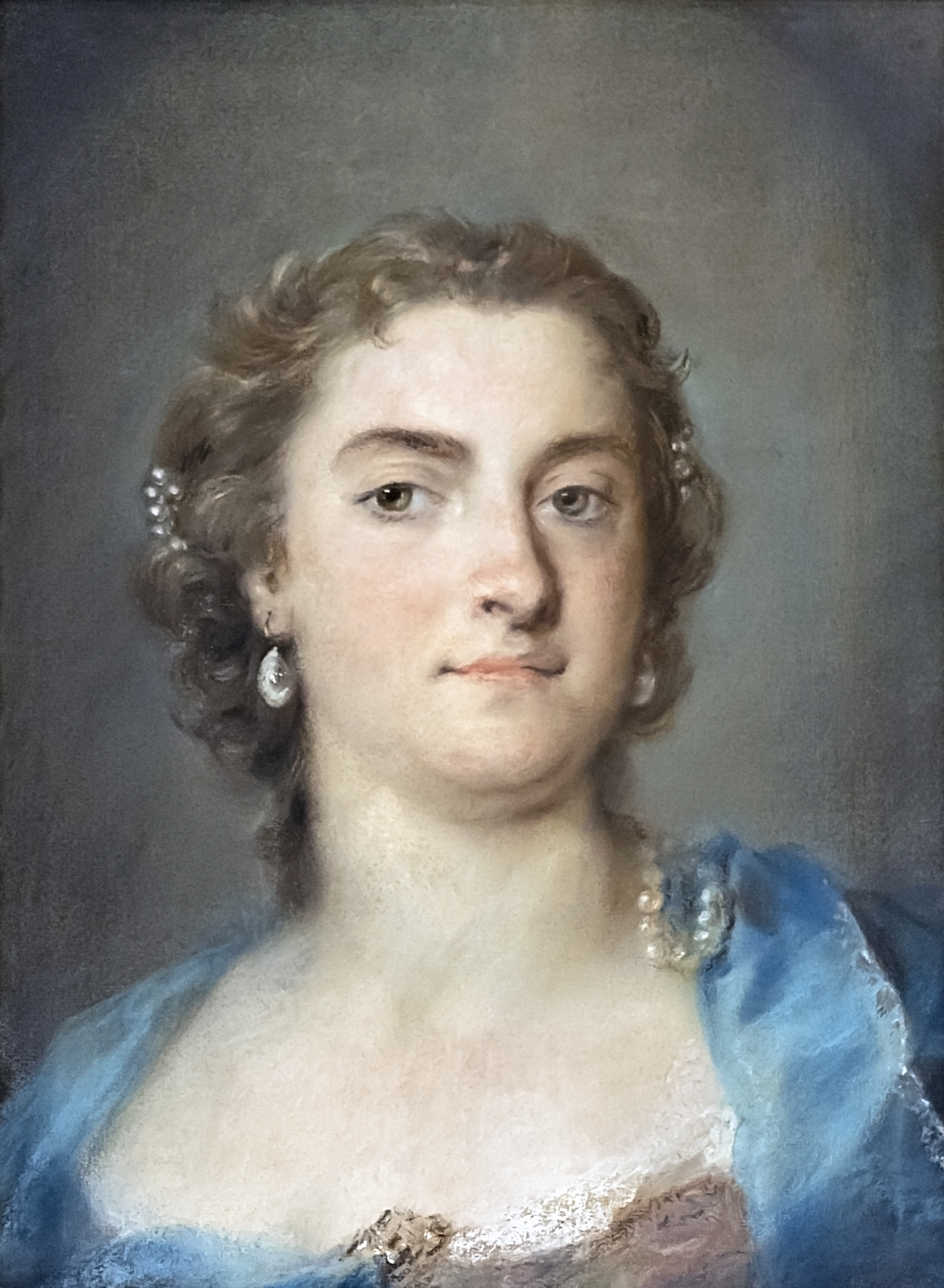
Faustina Bordoni, who created the role of Emira

Handel continued to supply operas for the trio of star singers, Senesino, Cuzzoni and Faustina (as she was known) however, even though these singers received astronomical fees, much more than he received for composing the works, which combined with declining audience numbers caused at least in part by the ridicule brought upon Italian opera by the rival sopranos' public spat, was causing severe financial difficulty for the Royal Academy of Music.

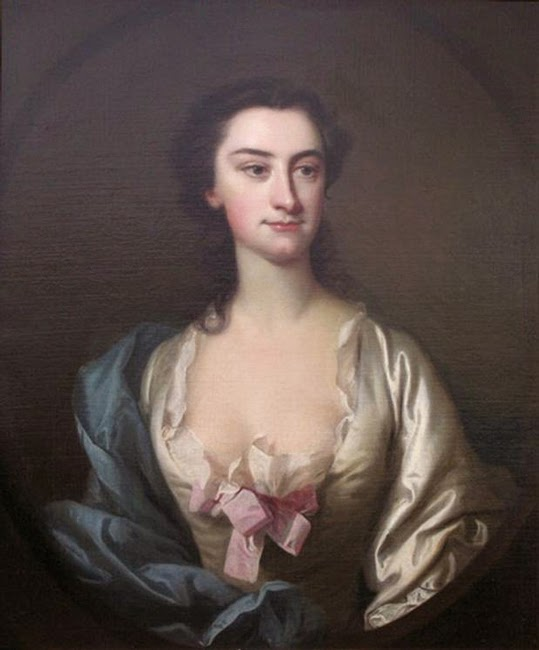
Francesca Cuzzoni, who created the role of Laodice

Additionally, on 28 January 1728, just as Siroe was nearing completion, John Gay's The Beggar's Opera, which specifically spoofed opera seria of the sort presented by the Royal Academy of Music, opened in London with sensational success and achieved the longest run of any stage piece up to that time. One of Handel's most loyal supporters, Mary Delany, lamented in a letter to a friend:

Yesterday I was at the rehearsal of the new opera composed by Handel: I like it extremely, but the taste of the town is so depraved, that nothing will be approved of but the burlesque. The Beggar's Opera entirely triumphs over the Italian one. I have not yet seen it, but everybody that has seen it, says it is very comical and full of humour.

A month later she was in even greater despair about opera in London:

The Opera will not survive after this winter... I am certain excepting some few, the English have no real taste for musick; for if they had, they could not neglect an entertainment so perfect in its kind for a parcel of ballad singers. I am so peevish about it, that I have no patience.

However Siroe achieved a successful run of eighteen performances as Delany wrote on 19 March: "Operas are something mended within this fortnight; they are much fuller than they have been any time this winter."

Nevertheless, Handel did not revive Siroe in any subsequent seasons.

The Royal Academy of Music collapsed at the end of the 1728/29 season, partly due to the huge fees paid to the star singers, and Cuzzoni and Faustina both left London for engagements in continental Europe. Handel started a new opera company with a new prima donna, Anna Strada. One of Handel's librettists, Paolo Rolli, wrote in a letter (the original is in Italian) that Handel said that Strada "sings better than the two who have left us, because one of them (Faustina) never pleased him at all and he would like to forget the other (Cuzzoni)."

18th century musicologist Charles Burney wrote of the gigue that concludes the overture to Siroe:

and the jig was always a favourite as long as movements in that measure were in fashion. Handel himself seems to have been not insensible to its merit, for I heard him play it by memory as a lesson at Mrs. Cibber's, with wonderful neatness and spirit near twenty years after it was composed.

The opera is scored for strings, two oboes and continuo (cello, lute and harpsichord).

== Recordings ==
Siroe discography
Year	Cast (high to low): Emira, Laodice, Medarse, Siroe, Arasse, Cosroe	Orchestra, Conductor	Label
1989, studio: Performing Arts Center, SUNY, Purchase	Julianne Baird, Andrea Matthews, Steven Rickards, d'Anna Fortunato, Frederick Urrey, John Ostendorf	Brewer Baroque Chamber Orchestra, Rudolph Palmer	CD: Newport Classic cat.: NCD 60125
2003	Johanna Stojkovic, Sunhae Im, Gunther Schmid, Ann Hallenberg, Timm de Jong, Sebastian Noack	Cappella Coloniensis, Andreas Spering	CD: Harmonia Mundi cat.: HMY 292182627
2013, live in Göttingen	Anna Dennis, Aleksandra Zamojska, Antonio Giovannini, Yosemeh Adjei, Ross Ramgobin, Lisandro Abadie	Göttingen Festival Orchestra, Laurence Cummings	CD: Accent Records cat.: ACC 26401
