= Sheroe =

Shērōē is a Middle Persian name, meaning 'The Lion', whose new Persian form is Shīrūya/Shiruyeh, شیرویه. Its uses include:

- Shērōē (590 – 628), better known by the dynastic name of Kavad II, a king of the Sasanian Empire in 628
- Shiruya al-Uswari, a nobleman of the Sasanian Empire
- Asfar ibn Shiruya (died 931), ruler of Tabiristan and northern Jibal between 928 and 930.
- Shiruyeh is a village in North Khorasan Province, Iran.

== See also ==
- Siroe (disambiguation)
