= Il finto astrologo =

Intermezzo by Niccolò Piccinni

- Intermezzo by Niccolò Piccinni
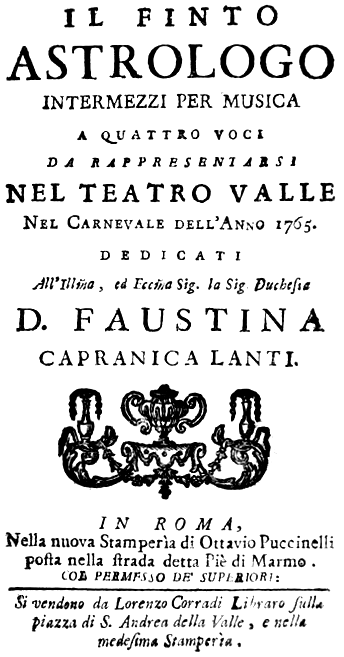

Il finto astrologo is an intermezzo by composer Niccolò Piccinni. The opera uses an Italian-language libretto by Carlo Goldoni. The work premiered at the Teatro Valle in Rome on 7 February 1765 with a cast that included the famous castrato Venanzio Rauzzini as Clarice.

Il finto astrologo is derived from Il mondo della luna, a libretto originally set to music by Baldassare Galuppi in 1750, with several modifications. The work of Piccinni has only two acts and is written for a reduced cast of four singers (Ecclittico, Buonafede, Clarice and Lisetta).

The first performance in modern times was produced in Fermo in 1988. The finale of the first act (which describes the imaginary journey of Buonafede to the Moon), has been described as "a typical opera buffa jewel".

== See also ==
- List of operas by Niccolò Piccinni
