= Maria Dickons =

British opera singer (c.1774–1833)

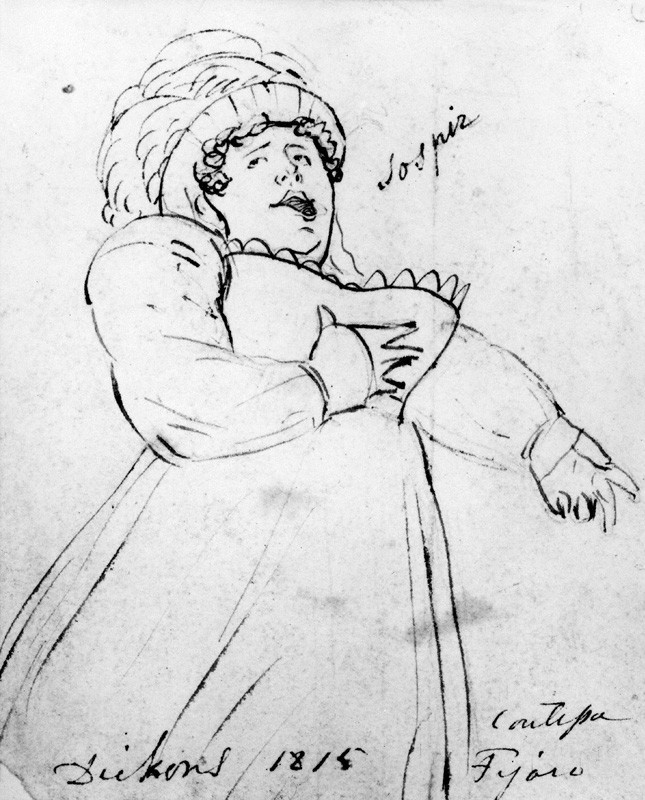
- by Alfred Edward Chalon in 1815
- Born: 1770s
- Died: 4 May 1833; Regent Street, London, England

Maria Dickons born Martha Frances Caroline Poole (1770s – 4 May 1833) was a British opera singer.

== Life ==
Martha Frances Caroline Poole was born to a large family in the early 1770s or thereabouts. Her father, William, recognised her musical talents as a singer and harpsichordist. She began her singing career at an early age playing the harpsichord at a concert in Oxford In 1785. She used the name Caroline Poole in her early career but changed to using Maria Poole until her marriage.

Dickons received her training in Bath under Venanzio Rauzzini and she appeared in one of his operas, La vestale, in 1787 in London at the King's Theatre and then at Vauxhall Gardens. By the time she married in 1800 she had appeared in Dublin, Edinburgh and Covent Garden where she had been paid eight pounds per annum.

Unfortunately her new husband's trading was not as successful as her singing so she returned to the stage for financial reasons in 1807 using her married name, Maria Dickons. She and her husband separated in 1810. Between 1807 and 1815 she appeared at prime locations in London, but her forays to Paris and Italy met with undocumented or mixed success. It is suspected that she was demoted in Venice, but she used her time valuably and she created a large multi-volume collection of Italian vocal music which she brought back to Britain.

Dickons returned to Covent Garden to work with Henry Bishop in his popularised operas in 1818 and 1819 and she then retired again.

Dickons died at her home in Regent Street in 1833.
