= Venanzio Rauzzini =

Italian opera singer

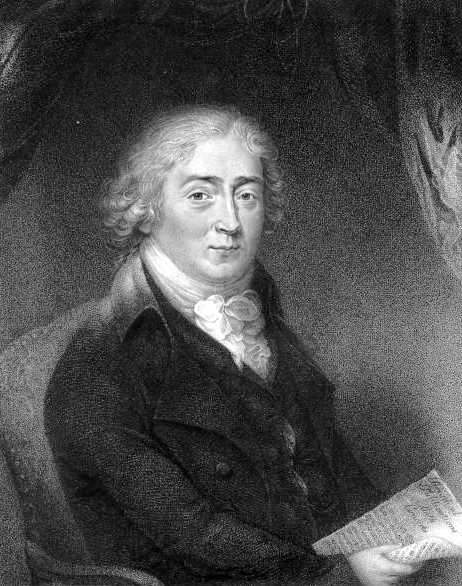
Stipple engraving by Robert Hancock

Venanzio Rauzzini (19 December 1746 – 8 April 1810) was an Italian castrato, composer, pianist, singing teacher and concert impresario. He is said to have first studied singing under a member of the Sistine Chapel Choir. He was a cantante soprano at the Socio Accademico of the Accademia di Santa Cecilia in Rome. He studied with Giuseppe Santarelli in Rome. Though unlikely, it has been suggested that Rauzzini may not in fact have been a castrato, but rather had an endocrine condition that prevented his voice from breaking, hence his many affairs as he was thought to be "safe". That said, scholars such as Paul Rice and Brianna Robertson-Kirkland reject this idea.

== Life ==
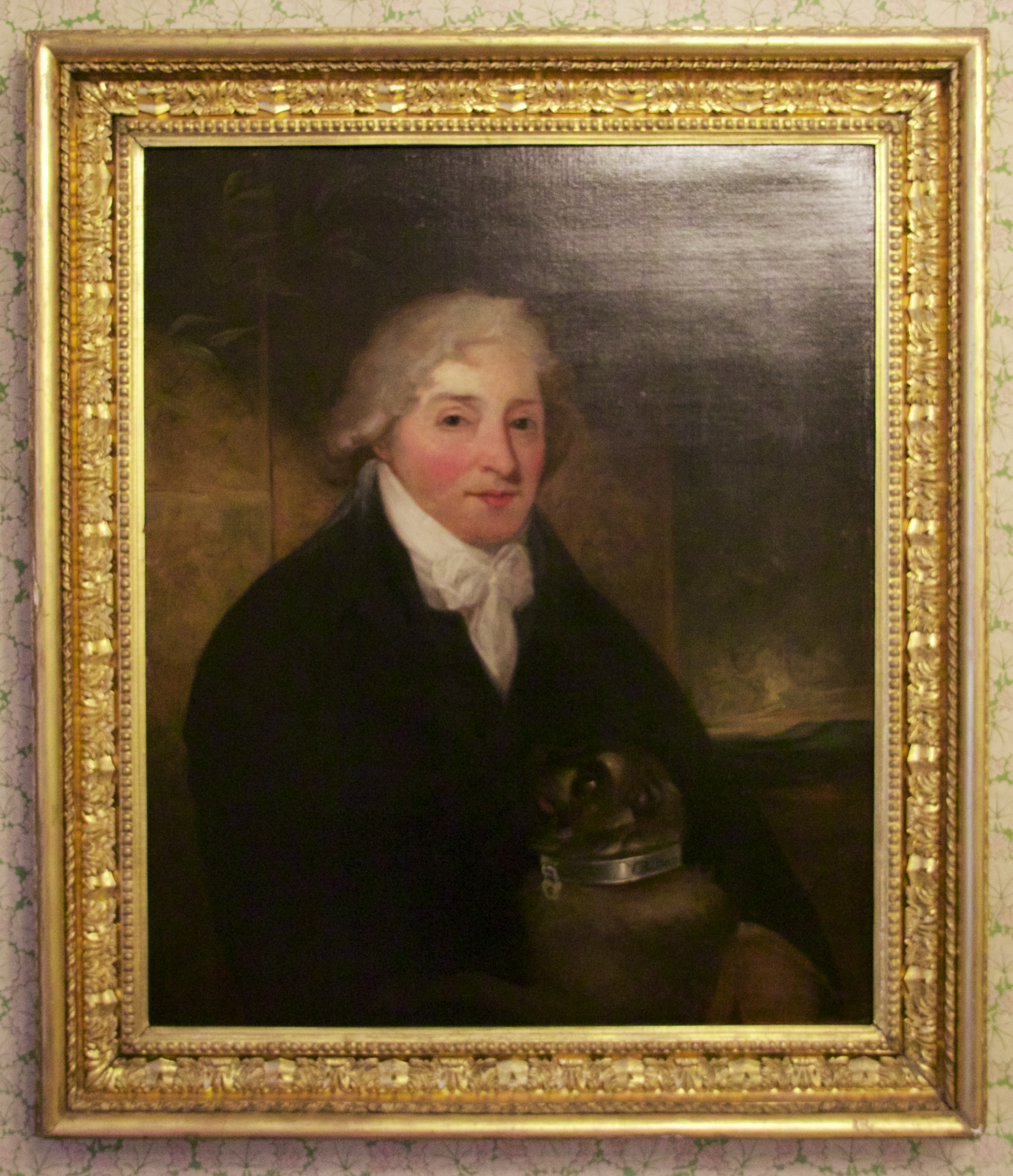
Portrait of Rauzzini with his dog Turk at the Herschel Museum of Astronomy

Rauzzini was born in Camerino. He made his opera debut in 1765 at the Teatro Valle in Rome portraying one of the female characters in Niccolò Piccinni's opera Il finto astrologo. He sang at the Teatro San Samuele in Venice in 1766, after which he performed at the Munich Hofoper in 1766–1767. Michael Kelly claimed that Rauzzini had to leave the Munich court because of his many affairs with married women. He next sang at the court at Vienna in 1767 where Wolfgang Amadeus Mozart "reacted with delight when he heard Rauzzini singing and offered him the role of primo uomo in his Lucio Silla (1772), in Milan, before composing the motet Exsultate Jubilate (1773) especially for him."

Rauzzini returned for performances in Venice and Munich during the early 1770s and also had a very successful run in London from 1774 until his retirement from the stage in 1778. After his opera career ended he worked as a singing and piano teacher and also composed a number of operas. After living in London for some years he settled in Bath in 1780 and became Director of the New Assembly Room Concerts in 1781. He also became a famous singing master, teaching many of the most famous British opera singers of the day. Joseph Haydn stayed with him in 1794 and composed the canon "Turk was a Faithful Dog" as a gift for his host, taking the words from the garden memorial to Rauzzini's favourite dog. Some of Rauzzini's pupils included Stephen Storace, Nancy Storace, Michael Kelly, John Braham Rosemond Mountain, and Maria Dickons. Rauzzini directed and financed concert life in Bath from c. 1781 until his death in 1810; many of his pupils appeared in the subscription concerts that he organised each year. Before dying he published vocal exercises and a treatise on singing. Rauzzini was buried in Bath Abbey where there is a memorial erected to him by his pupils Nancy Storace and John Braham.

His brother, Matteo (1754-1791), was also a composer and a teacher of singing.

== Operas ==
- Piramo e Tisbe, libretto by Ranieri de' Calzabigi, (London, His Majesty's Theatre, 16 marzo 1775)
- L'ali d'amore, libretto by Carlo Francesco Badini (1776)
- L'eroe cinese, libretto by Pietro Metastasio (1782)
- Creusa in Delfo, libretto by Gaspare Martinelli (1783)
- Alina ossia La regina di Golconda, libretto by Antonio Andrei (1784)
- La vestale, libretto by Badini (1787)
