= Diane et Endymion =

French-language opera by Niccolò Piccinni

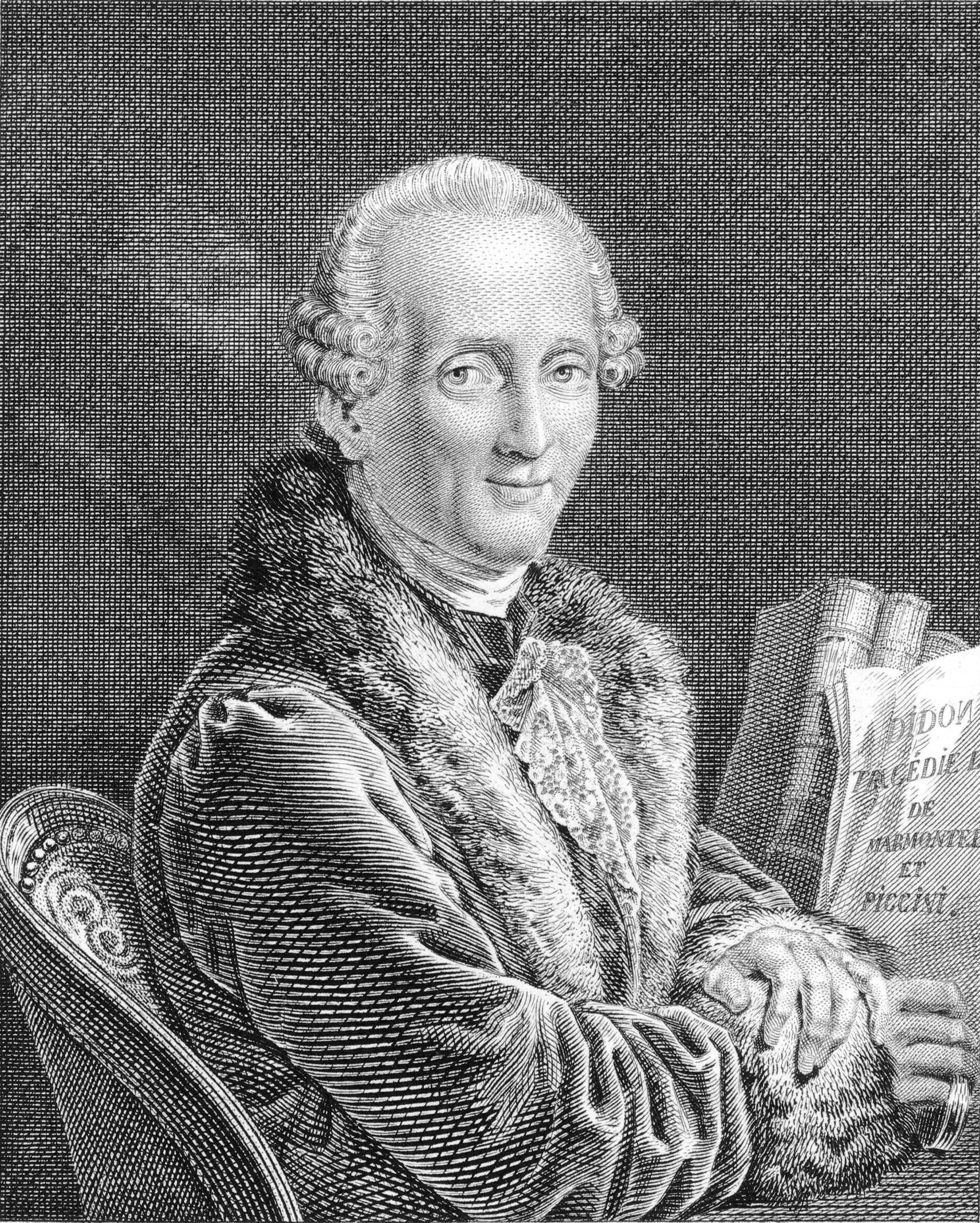
Niccolò Piccinni

Diane et Endymion (Diana and Endymion) is a French-language opera by the composer Niccolò Piccinni, first performed at the Académie Royale de Musique, Paris (the Paris Opera) on 7 September 1784. It takes the form of an opéra (tragédie lyrique) in three acts. The libretto, by Jean-François Espic Chevalier de Liroux, is based on the story of the goddess Diana's love for the shepherd Endymion.

== Sources ==
- (in French) Félix Clément and Pierre Larousse Dictionnaire des Opéras, p. 212.
