= Pasquale Errichelli =

Italian composer and organist

Pasquale Errichelli (also Ericchelli or Enrichelli; 1730–1785) was an Italian composer and organist based in the city of Naples. Trained at the Conservatorio della Pietà dei Turchini, his compositional output consists of 7 operas, 2 cantatas, 1 symphony, 3 sonatas, several concert arias, and the oratorio Gerosolina protetta. He was for many years the organist at the Cattedrale di Napoli.

== Operas ==
- La serva astuta (opera buffa, 1753, Naples; in collaboration with Gioacchino Cocchi)
- Il finto turco (opera buffa, libretto by Antonio Palomba, 1753, Naples; in collaboration with Gioacchino Cocchi)
- Issipile (opera seria, libretto by Pietro Metastasio, 1754, Naples)
- La finta 'mbreana (commedia, libretto by G. Bisceglia, 1756, Naples; in collaboration with Nicola Bonifacio Logroscino)
- Solimano (opera seria, libretto by Giovanni Ambrogio Migliavacca, 1757, Rome)
- Siroe (opera seria, libretto by Pietro Metastasio, 1758, Naples)
- Eumene (3 Acts) (opera seria, libretto by Apostolo Zeno, 1771, Naples; Act 1 by Gian Francesco de Majo, Act 2 by Giacomo Insanguine)
