= Gennaro Manna =

Italian composer (1715–1779)

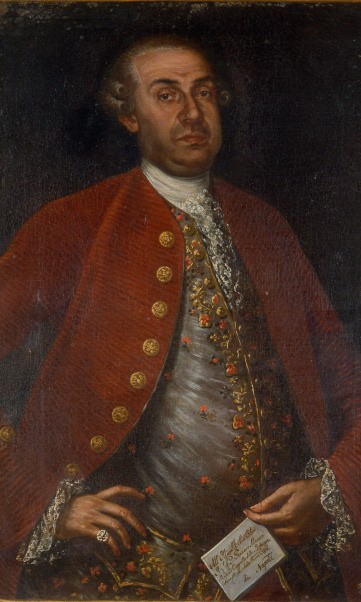

Background information
- Born: 12 December 1715; Naples, Italy
- Died: 28 December 1779 (aged 64) Naples, Italy
- Genres: Opera
- Occupations: Composer, teacher

Gennaro Manna (12 December 1715 - 28 December 1779) was an Italian composer based in Naples. He was a member of the Neapolitan School. His compositional output includes 13 operas and more than 150 sacred works, including several oratorios.

== Life ==
The son of Giuseppe Maria Manna and Caterina Feo (sister of the composer Francesco Feo), he received his musical training at the Conservatorio di Sant'Onofrio a Porta Capuana in Naples, where his uncle Francesco Feo was primo maestro. He made his operatic debut at the Teatro Argentina in Rome with Tito Manlio on 21 January 1742. Thanks to its success, he received a new commission from the Teatro San Giovanni Grisostomo in Venice for the carnival of the following year, where he gave Siroe re di Persia.

After his return to Naples, he composed Festa teatrale per la nascita dell'Infante with Nicola Bonifacio Logroscino, which was never staged. In 1744, he was appointed maestro di cappella of the Senate of Naples, succeeding Domenico Sarro, and in January 1745, with Achille in Sciro, he made his debut at the Teatro di San Carlo with Giovanna Astrua and Gaetano Majorano, which was well received. On 1 October 1755, after the death of Francesco Durante, the primo maestro of the Conservatory of Santa Maria di Loreto, he took the position of interim teacher next to the secondo maestro Pietro-Antonio Gallo, but on 13 February 1756, he won the competition to become permanent. Between 1760 and 1761, he performed his last theatrical works, the serenata Enea in Cuma and the opera seria Temistocle. In January 1761, he succeeded his uncle Feo as director of the chapel of the Santissima Annunziata Maggiore, and on May 9 of the same year, he received the same position for the Naples Cathedral. He remained active as a composer of sacred music until his death.

Within his family his brother Giacinto Mannait and his cousin Cristoforo Manna also gained fame as musicians.

== Style ==
Unlike his contemporaries Niccolò Jommelli, Gaetano Latilla and Girolamo Abos, he left the field of opera buffa to deal only with that of the opera seria, in which he was much appreciated by the composers of his time. In his compositional style, there are elements of both the galant style and pre-classicism.

== Works ==
=== Theatrical works ===
- Tito Manlio (opera seria, libretto by Gaetano Roccaforte, 1742, Rome)
- Siroe re di Persia (opera seria, libretto by Pietro Metastasio, 1743, Venice)
- Festa teatrale per la nascita dell'Infante (serenata, in collaboration with Nicola Bonifacio Logroscino, 1743, Naples, never staged)
- Artaserse (opera seria, revision of the opera of the same name by Leonardo Vinci, libretto by Pietro Metastasio, 1743, Naples)
- Achille in Sciro (opera seria, libretto by Pietro Metastasio, 1745)
- L'Impero dell'universo con Give (componimento drammatico, libretto by Ranieri de' Calzabigi, 1745, Naples)
- Lucio Vero ossia Il Vologeso (opera seria, libretto by Apostolo Zeno, 1745, Teatro San Carlo di Napoli, with Gaetano Majorano ed Annibale Pio Fabri)
- Arsace (opera seria, 1746, Naples)
- La clemenza di Tito (opera seria, 1747, Messina)
- Adriano placata (opera seria, 1748, Ferrara)
- Lucio Papirio dittatore (opera pastorale, libretto by Apostolo Zeno, 1748, Roma)
- Il Lucio Papirio (opera seria, 1749, Palermo)
- Eumene (opera seria, libretto by Apostolo Zeno, 1750, Turin)
- Didone abbandonata (opera seria, libretto by Pietro Metastasio, 1751, Venice)
- Demofoonte (opera seria, libretto by Pietro Metastasio, 1754, Teatro Regio di Torino directed by Giovanni Battista Somis)
- Enea in Cuma (serenata, 1760, Naples)
- Il Sacrificio di Melchisedec (componimento drammatico, libretto by M. Tarzia, 1776, Naples)

=== Sacred music ===
==== Oratorios ====
- Gios re di Giuda (1747, Naples)
- Sepultra Sarae sive Pietas in mortuos (1748)
- Davide (Palermo, 1751)
- Rubri maris trajectus (Monte Reale, 1761)
- Debora (1769)
- Esther (1770)
- Il Seraficio Alverna (Naples)
- Israelis liberato sive Esther (Monte Reale)

==== Other sacred music ====
- 12 masses
- 7 Gloria
- Domine ad adiuvantum for 5 voices
- 2 Credo
- 2 Magnificat
- 3 Te Deum
- 14 Lamentations
- Christus
- 2 Lezioni per la notte del Santissimo Natale
- 3 Jube Domine benedicere for solo voice
- 3 Benedictus Dominus
- Confitebor for solo voice
- 12 Dixit
- 2 Laudate pueri for solo voice
- Gloria patri for solo voice
- 2 Veni sponsa
- Lauda Sion for 5 voices
- Pange lingua
- 4 Inni
- Tantum ergo for solo voice
- Cori di anime penanti for 5 voices
- 35 motets with choir
- 14 motets and arias for solo voice
- Passion according to John
- Other minor works
