= Alphonse du Congé Dubreuil =

French poet and playwright (1734–1801)

Alphonse du Congé (or Ducongé) Dubreuil (French pronunciation: [alfɔ̃s dy kɔ̃ʒe dybʁœj]; 19 June 1734 – 22 February 1801) was an 18th-century French poet and playwright.

In 1777, he wrote an opera libretto on the theme of Iphigénie en Tauride, which he proposed to Christoph Willibald Gluck but the text was eventually set in music by Niccolò Piccinni.

== Works ==
- 1776: La Pucelle de Paris, poème en douze chants
- 1781: Iphigénie en Tauride, opera, music by Niccolò Piccinni, premiered at Academy Royale de musique 23 January
- 1790: L'Amant travesti ou les Muletiers, two-act opéra bouffon, after Jean de La Fontaine, music by Marc-Antoine Désaugiers, premiered in Paris, Théâtre de Monsieur, 2 November
- 1794: Paul et Virginie ou le Triomphe de la vertu, three-act drame lyrique, after Jacques-Henri Bernardin de Saint-Pierre, music by Jean-François Lesueur, premiere at Academy Royale de musique 13 January
