= Claude Guimond de La Touche =

French playwright and poet

- Born: 17 October 1723; Châteauroux, Province of Berry, France
- Died: 14 February 1760 (aged 36)
- Occupations: Playwright; Poet

Claude Guimond de La Touche (17 October 1723 – 14 February 1760) was an 18th-century French playwright and poet.

== Life ==
After completing his studies in Rouen, La Touche entered the Society of Jesus where he remained until the age of fourteen. After leaving, he devoted himself to poetry and began with an ode on the birth of the Duke of Burgundy entitled Mars au berceau (1751, in-8°).

The only tragedy that he made and which made his name live, Iphigénie en Tauride, was presented at the Théâtre-Français 4 June 1757. If one believes mademoiselle Clairon, the fifth act, which the actors were not satisfied with, was re-built this very day by the author, yet the curtain rose at half past five.

The success of Iphigénie en Tauride was all enthusiasm. Guimond asked again loudly, let himself get on stage and fainted with joy as he withdrew. His play, remarkable in several respects and remained as one of the best second-rate tragedies, however, was abused by Fréron, Grimm and Geoffroy who called it a "burlesque farce," an "extravagant hodgepodge."

In imitation of the Greeks, or simply following the example of Collé, the author fulfilled his subject, without introducing any love episodes, and maintaining the simplicity of Euripides' plan failed not of interest nor pathetic. Many loans were reported: the scene of recognition was drawn entirely from the opera Iphigénie by Duché in 1704; the one where Iphigénie asks Orestes about the fate of the family of Atreus, whose background is in Euripides, recalled by some details Oreste et Pylade by Lagrange-Chancel (1697), but improving it. The author was also criticized for exaggerating Thoas' stupid ferocity uselessly for the action, and for not having enough prepared nor motivated the outcome. As for style, it was said that the heavy, monotonous, versification, the declamatory pieces and Iphigénie en Tauride language mistakes were saved by the energy and heat that animated all of the work that was printed several time (Paris, 1758, 1784, 1811, 1815, 1818, in-8°).

Guimond de La Touche also left an Épître à l’amitié (London, 1758, in-8°); les Soupirs du cloître, ou le Triomphe du fanatisme (1765, in-8°), a satire against his former colleagues, the Jesuits.

== Sources ==
- Gustave Vapereau, Dictionnaire universel des littératures, Paris, Hachette, 1876, p. 958
