= Siroe (Hasse) =

Opera by Johann Adolph Hasse (1733)

- Opera by Johann Adolph Hasse
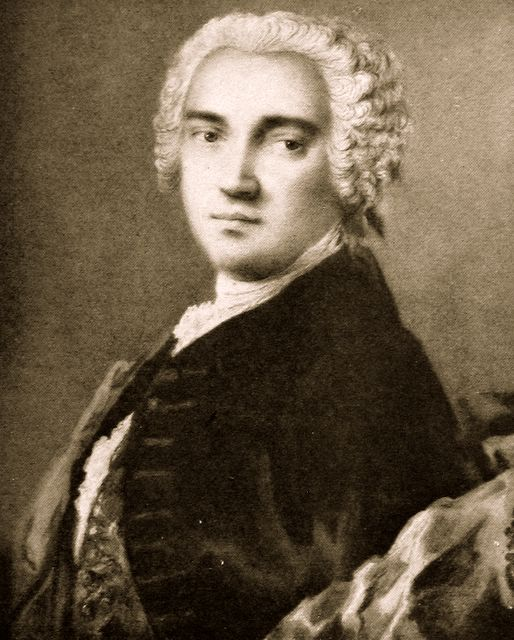
- The opera's composer, Johann Adolph Hasse
- Librettist: Pietro Metastasio
- Premiere: 2 May 1733; Teatro Malvezzi, Bologna

Siroe, or Siroe re di Persia (Siroes, King of Persia), is an opera seria in three acts by Johann Adolph Hasse. The libretto was by Metastasio. As with many of the latter's libretti, Siroe was also set by Hasse's contemporaries, for example Vinci, Vivaldi and Handel (see his Siroe of 1728).

== Performance history ==
Siroe was first performed on 2 May 1733 at the Teatro Malvezzi in Bologna. It was produced again in Naples at the Teatro di San Carlo on 4 November 1747.

Hasse was asked to reset the opera for the Elector of Saxony and this version was first performed on 3 August 1763 at the Opernhaus am Zwinger in Dresden.

Siroe received its modern-day premiere in an uncut version by Ensemble Serse in September 2008 in a performance which, including two fifteen-minute intervals, lasted just under five hours. Siroe was revived in an abridged form for the 2011 London Handel Festival by Ensemble Serse at St George's Hanover Square Church in London on 15 April 2011 in a performance which lasted two and a half hours. In 2018 the Nederlandse Reisopera staged performances in the Netherlands of a version lasting about 3 hours.

== Roles ==
Roles, voice types, premiere cast
Role	Voice type	Premiere cast, 2 May 1733 Conductor: Hasse
Cosroe, King of Persia	tenor	Filippo Giorgio
Siroe, older son of Cosroe	soprano castrato	Farinelli
Medarse, younger son of Cosroe	soprano castrato	Caffarelli
Emira, daughter of Asbite, King of Cambaya, and Siroe's lover	contralto	Vittoria Tesi
Laodice, Cosroe's mistress and Arasse's sister	soprano	Anna Maria Peruzzini
Arasse, Cosroe's general and confidante of Siroe	contralto	Elisabetta Uttini

== Synopsis ==
Medarse wishes to supplant Siroe as Cosroe's heir. Siroe is in love with Emira, daughter of Cosroe's former enemy Asbite, disguised as a man called Idaspe, while Siroe is loved in turn by his father's mistress Laodice. Eventually Cosroe recognizes the loyalty of Siroe and Emira, and makes Siroe the new king.
