= Gioacchino Cocchi =

Italian composer (c.1712–1796)

- Born: about 1712; Naples
- Died: 11 September 1796; Venice, Republic of Venice
- Years active: 1747–1788
- Era: Classical
- Known for: La maestra, 1747
- Spouse: Elisabetta Giani

Gioacchino Cocchi (circa 1712 – 11 September 1796) was a Neapolitan composer, principally of opera.

Cocchi was probably born in Naples in about 1712, although his place of birth has also been given as Padua. His first works were performed in Naples and in Rome; the most successful was La maestra, written in Naples in 1747. It was performed at the Teatro Nuovo sopra Toledo of that city in the spring of 1747, and at the Teatro Formagliari of Bologna in October of the same year; on 11 March 1749 it was given at the King's Theatre in London, and in 1752 at the Teatro de' Fiorentini of Naples, with the title La scaltra governante. It was performed as La scaltra governatrice at the Académie de Musique in Paris on 25 January 1753, and as Die Schulmeisterin in 1754 at the Schlosstheater in Berlin. The work established a solid international reputation for Cocchi.

He was in Venice from 1749 to 1757; there he became maestro di cappella of the Ospedale degli Incurabili, standing in for Vincenzo Legrenzo Ciampi, who had been given permission to visit London for an extended period. While in Venice, he taught composition to Andrea Lucchesi, who later was appointed Kapellmeister in Bonn. Cocchi travelled in 1757 to London, where he stayed until about 1772, when he returned to Venice. He died there on 11 September 1796.

== Works ==
Cocchi wrote some fifty operatic works, of which about half were opera seria and slightly fewer were opera buffa. Among these were many settings of libretti by Metastasio, including Siface, re di Numidia (1748), Siroe (1749) and Alessandro nell'Indie (1761); and five by Carlo Goldoni. He also wrote eight oratorios and a variety of chamber music, both vocal and instrumental. His last known work is a Dixit Dominus dating from 1788.
