= Siroe (Errichelli) =

1758 dramma per musica or opera seria in 3 acts by Pasquale Errichelli

Siroe is a dramma per musica or opera seria in 3 Acts by composer Pasquale Errichelli. The opera uses an Italian language libretto by Pietro Metastasio. The opera premiered at the Teatro di San Carlo in Naples on 26 December 1758. Vincenzo Re designed the sets for the premiere production.

== Roles ==
Role	Voice type	Premiere Cast, 26 December 1758 (Conductor: - Domenico de Miccio)
Siroe	castrato	Tommaso Guarducci
Emira	soprano	Caterina Gabrielli
Medarse	mezzo-soprano	Caterina Galli
Arasse	tenor	Gregorio Babbi
Cosroe	bass	Antonio Ambrogi
Laodice	soprano	Maddalena Valle
