= Nicola Logroscino =

Italian composer (1698–c. 1765)

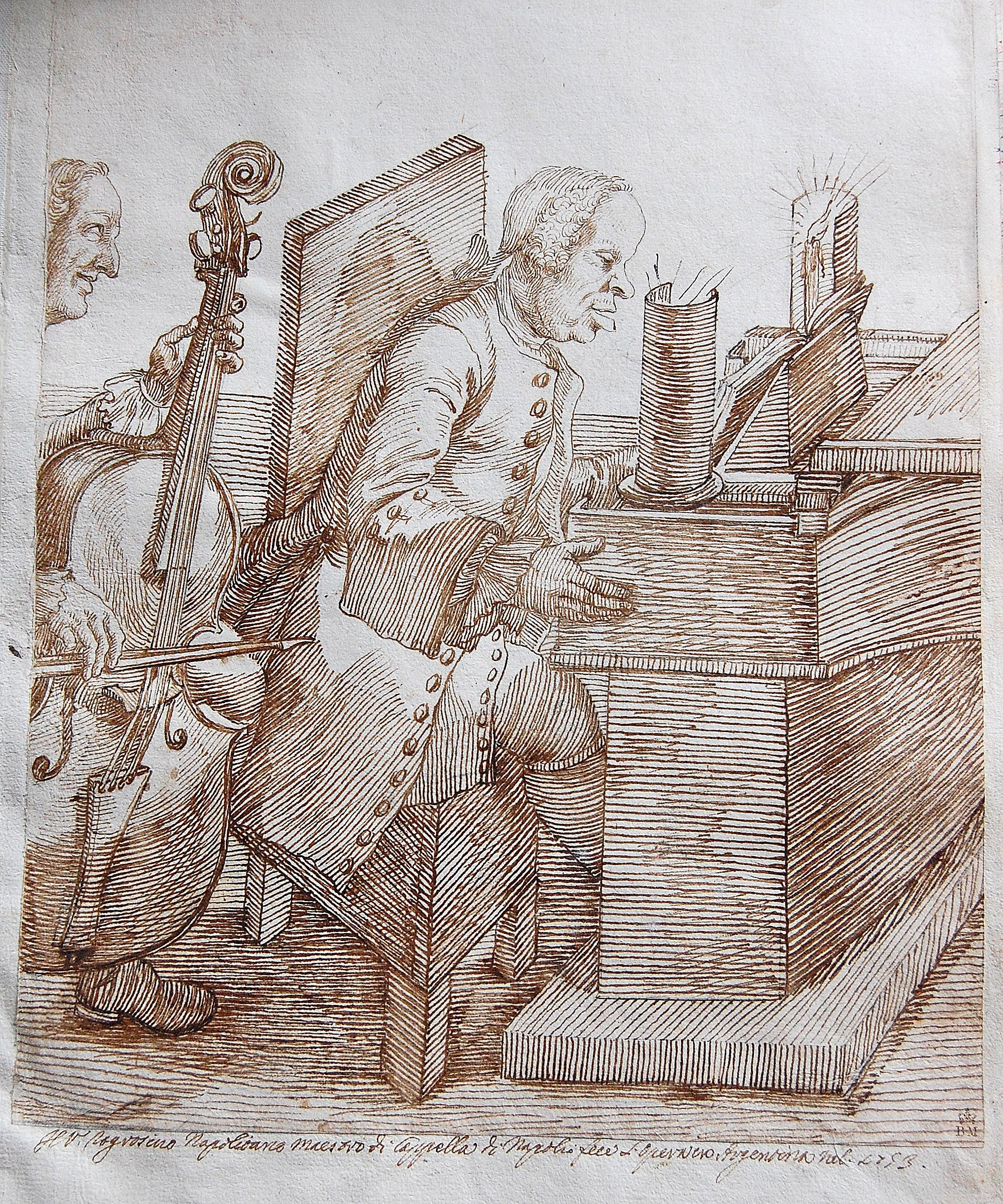
Nicola Logroscino

Nicola Bonifacio Logroscino (1698 – c. 1765) was an Italian composer who is best known for his operas.

He was born at Bitonto (Province of Bari) in the Apulia region and was a pupil of Giovanni Veneziano and Giuliano Perugino at the Conservatorio di Santa Maria di Loreto. In 1738 he collaborated with Leonardo Leo and others in the hasty production of Demetrio; in the autumn of the same year he produced a comic opera, L'inganno per inganno, the first of a long series of comic operas, the success of which won him the name of "il Dio dell'opera buffa". He went to Palermo, probably in 1747, as a teacher of counterpoint; as an opera composer he is last heard of in 1760, and is supposed to have died about 1763 or 1765.

Logroscino has been credited with the invention of the concerted operatic finale, but as far as can be seen from the score of Governatore and the few remaining fragments of other operas, his finales show no advance upon those of Leo. As a musical humorist, he has been classed with Gioacchino Rossini.
