= Cappella Neapolitana =

Italian early music ensemble

Cappella Neapolitana is an early music ensemble based in Naples and dedicated to the recovery of Neapolitan musical heritage, primarily from the baroque era.

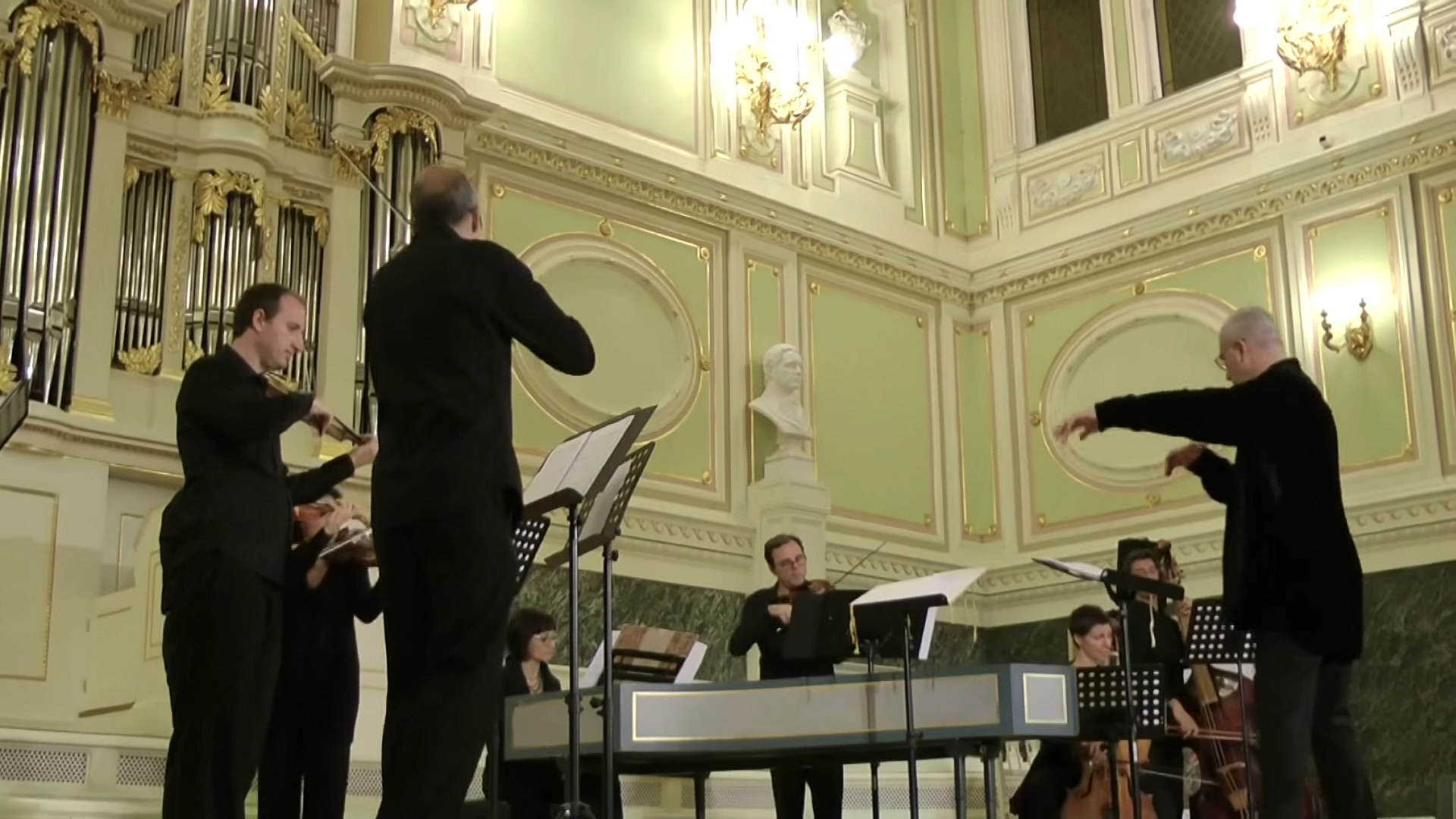
Cappella Neapolitana

The ensemble originally named Cappella della Pietà de' Turchini was founded in 1987 by the musicologist and conductor Antonio Florio, who studied under Nino Rota, Among other things, it participated in events at the church of Pietà dei Turchini. The names of church, conservatory, and now the modern cappella and music centre go back to the turquoise (Italian turchino) shirts worn by the original children of the institute. The association between church, conservatory, and commercial opera productions goes back to the roots of the original Pietà de' Turchini, and the days when Leonardo Leo used his students from the Conservatorio Pietà de' Turchini as chorus singers in his opera productions.

Florio's work in recovering music which has lain unperformed for three centuries often involves reconstructing lost parts, or "discreetly recomposing" missing portions from larger works. A particular focus has been the recovery of the music of Francesco Provenzale, Giovanni Salvatore and Cristofaro Caresana, sometimes in cooperation with the musicologist Dinko Fabris.

In 2016, L'orchestra della Pietà dei Turchini was renamed Cappella Neapolitana Antonio Florio.

The concerts of the Cappella and other artists at the Centro di Musica are now widely acknowledged as a tourist attraction in Naples.

The Capella commenced recording with the Symphonia label. Then entered cooperation with the Opus111 label founded by Yolanta Skura for the production of an ambitious and extensive series of recordings of Neapolitan music, Tesori di Napoli, originally scheduled to contain 50 CDs. however this project slowed and then ceased after 2000 when Opus 111 was acquired by Naïve.

== Awards ==
- Premio Franco Abbiati from Associazione Nazionale Critici Musicali;
- Premio Vivaldi by Fondazione Cini di Venezia;
- Premio dell'anno by Le Monde.

== Selected discography ==
Symphonia

- Vespro Solenne (Napoli 1632). G. M. Sabino, Majello, Bartolo. (Symphonia 91S04) 1993
- Cantate Napoletane Vol.I Oh cielo, oh amore. (Symphonia 91S09)
- Lo Monteverde Voltato a lo Napolitano. Cerronio, A. Sabino, G.M. Sabino, F. Sabino, Falconieri, Stella (Symphonia 93S19)
- Sui palchi delle stelle - Musica sacra nei all'epoca di Provenzale (Symphonia93S20) 1994
- Cantate Napoletane Vol.II Cantate, Canzonette e Dialoghi. Provenzale, Gaetano Greco (Symphonia 94S29) 1995
- Magnificat anima mea – Il Culto Mariano e l'Oratorio Filippino nella Napoli del'600 Antonio Nola, Fabrizio Dentice ("passeggiati da Donatello Coya"), Beatus Vir by Provenzale, Magnificat by Salvatore. (Symphonia 95138) 1996
- Cantate Napoletane Vol.III L'Amante Impazzito. Faggioli, Provenzale, Durante (Symphonia 96147)

Opus111

- Caresana. 'Per la Nascita del Verbo'. La caccia del toro. La tarantella. La pastorale. Florio (Opus111) Tesori di Napoli Vol.1, reissued 2007.
- Provenzale. Passione. Salvatore. Stabat Mater. Litanie (Opus111) Tesori di Napoli Vol.2
- L'Opera Buffa Napoletana. Leo. Arias from L'Alidoro. La Fente zengare. Vinci. Arias. Florio (Opus111) 1996 Tesori di Napoli Vol.3.
- Provenzale. sacred opera: La colomba ferita 1672 (2CD) Florio (Opus111) Tesori di Napoli Vol. 4
- Provenzale. Vespro. 8 psalms. Caresana Vanitas vanitatum. (Opus111) 1998 Tesori di Napoli Vol.5
- Provenzale. Motetti – 4 motets for 2 sopranos. Avitrano sonatas. (Opus111) 1999 Tesori di Napoli Vol.6
- Napolitane - villanelle, arie, moresche 1530–1570. Luigi Dentice, G.D. da Nola, da Milano, Fontana, di Maio, et al. Ensemble Micrologus and Cappella de' Turchini. (Opus 111) 1999 (Awards Diapason d'Or de l'année) Tesori di Napoli Vol.7
- Leonardo Vinci. Li zite 'ngalera (The Lovers on the Galley) commedia per musica - opera buffa in Neapolitan dialect(2CD) (Opus111) Tesori di Napoli Vol.8
- Jommelli. Veni Creator Spiritus. Jommelli, Nicola Porpora, Barbella, Sabatino, and Cafaro. (Opus111) 1999 Tesori di Napoli Vol.9
- Giuseppe Cavallo (d.1684). oratorio: Il Giudizio universale 1681. (Opus111) Tesori di Napoli Vol.10.
- Gaetano Latilla. La Finta Cameriera (Naples, 1738) 2CD (Opus111 30-275/276) Tesori di Napoli Vol. 11
- Festa Napolitana – Giramo, Giaccio, Piccinni, Negri, Cottrau. (Opus111) 2001 Tesori di Napoli Vol.12.
- Jommelli. intermezzo: Don Trastullo (Opus111) 2002 Tesori di Napoli Vol. 13
- Paisiello Pulcinella vendicato (Opus111) Tesori di Napoli Vol.14
- Francesco Cavalli. Statira, Principessa di Persia. 2CD (OP 30382 Naïve) 2004 Tesori di Napoli Vol.15
- Provenzale. La bella devozione – Pangue lingua. Dialogo per la Pascua II. Caresana Missa a 8 Florio (Opus111) Tesori di Napoli Vol.16
- Napoli/Madrid - Vinci, Nebra, Petrini. Cantate e Intermezzi. (Opus111/Naïve OP 30274) 2007

Other

- Badia. La Fuga in Egitto. Florio (ORF). recorded for radio 1996, released 2001
- Provenzale. Missa Defuntorum. Caresana. Dixit Dominus. Florio (Eloquentia) 2007
- P.A. Fiocco (1654–1714, father) Missa concertata quinti toni. Sacri concerti. Florio (Cyprès 3615) 2009
- Cantate napolitane del ‘700. Fiorenza, Grillo, Leo, de Majo, Ugolino. (Eloquentia) 2009
- Leo. L’Alidoro (The golden wings) comic opera. Production at Reggio Emilia, February 2008, DVD Dynamic - 2009 (Award: Diapason d’or)

Glossa

- Caresana. L'Adoratione de' Maggi - 4 Christmas cantatas, Partenope, secular cantata, 2011* Gaetano Veneziano. Tenebrae, 2011
- reissue of 3 vols of Neapolitan cantatas 1991–96 as Il Canto della Sirena 2011 Provenzale et al. Glossa GCD 922603 (3 CDs Reissue of Symphonia SY91S09, SY94S29, & SY96147). Pino De Vittorio, tenor.
- Il viaggio di Faustina. Roberta Invernizzi. Arias for Faustina Bordoni. Bononcini, Hasse, Porpora, Mancini and Vinci. Glossa, in preparation 2012.
- Il Tesoro di San Gennaro. Nicola Fago, A. & D. Scarlatti, Caresana and Veneziano. Glossa, 2013.
- La Santissima Trinità (Oratorio, Naples 1693). Gaetano Veneziano. Glossa, 2014.
- Ghirlanda Sacra: Early 17th-century music in Naples. Glossa GCD C80019, 2015.
