= Cataldo Amodei =

Italian Baroque composer (1649–1693)

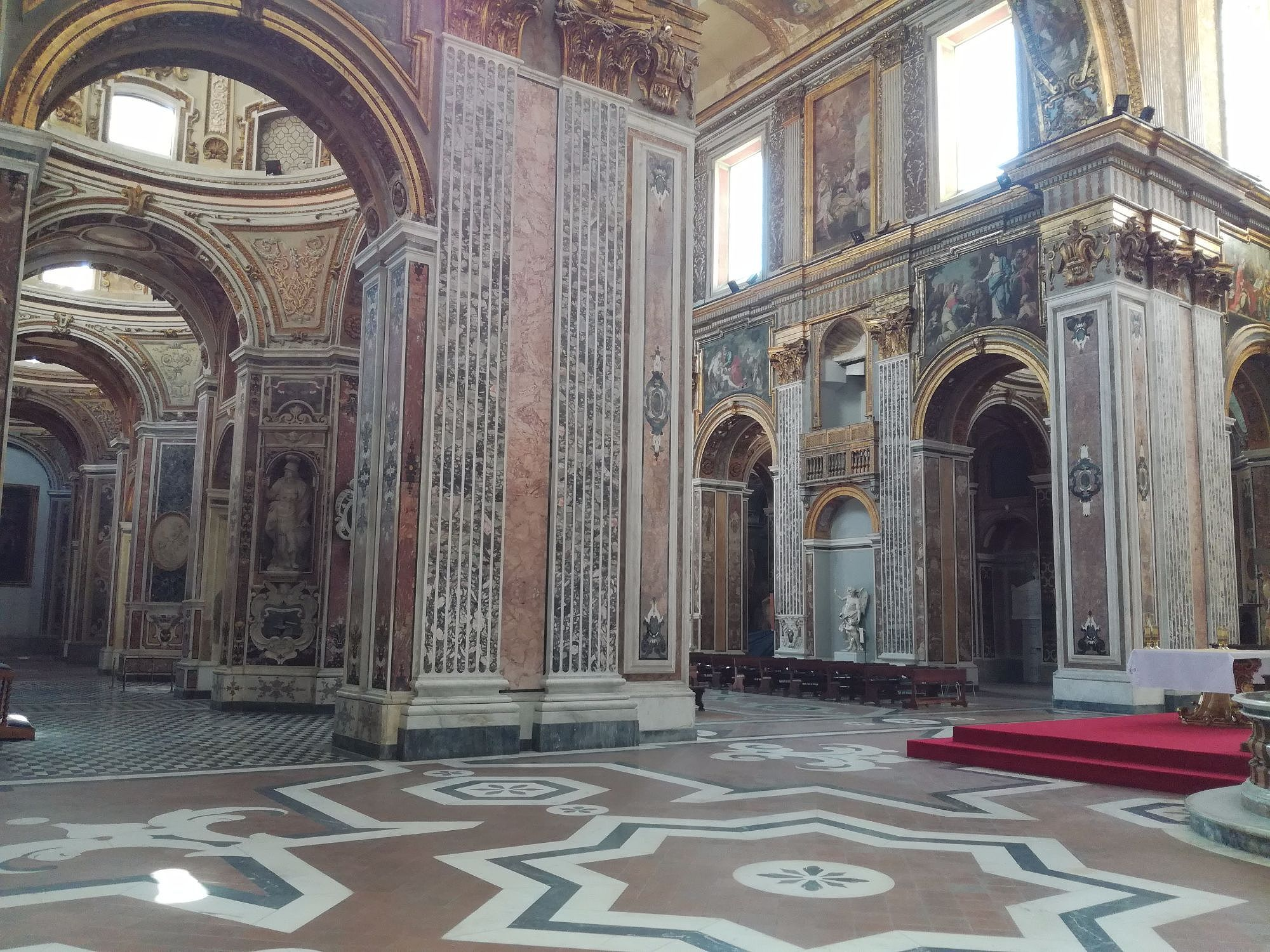
Interior of the San Paolo Maggiore, where Amodei worked for much of his career

Cataldo Vito Amodei (6 May 1649 – 13 July 1693) was an Italian composer of the mid-Baroque period who spent his career in Naples. His cantatas were important predecessors to the active cantata production of 18th-century Naples, and he stands with the elder Francesco Provenzale and younger Alessandro Scarlatti as among the principal Italian cantata composers. Other surviving works include a book of motets dedicated to Leopold I, Holy Roman Emperor; a serenata; two pastorales; two psalms; and four oratorios, which were important contributions to their genre.

Amodei held posts at various musical institutions, maestro del coro (choirmaster) at San Paolo Maggiore and two prestigious conservatories: the Conservatorio di Sant'Onofrio a Porta Capuana (1680/81–1688) and second choirmaster at Conservatorio Santa Maria di Loreto (1687–1689). His virtuosic 1685 book of cantatas, Cantate, Op. 2, was the first book of cantatas published in Naples.

== Life and career ==
=== Early life ===
Cataldo Amodei was born in Sciacca, Sicily, near Agrigento; at the time, Sciacca had a reputation for producing important Sicilian musicians. In 2003, the musicologist Domenico Antonio D'Alessandro identified Amodei with a "Cathaldus Vitus" ("Cataldo Vito"), born in 6 May 1649 and baptized the same day at St. Mary Magdalene, Sciacca. (Note: Prior to said identification, his birthdate was traditionally dated to c. 1649 or c. 1650.) Accordingly, Amodei's full name was Cataldo Vito Amodei, and he was the last of six children to Gaspare and Antonia, with Antonio de Facio and Francesa Nicolosi as his godparents. His family probably consisted of mostly merchants of Genoese origin. The priest Bonaventura Sanfilippo-Galiotto records in his Sacrum Xacca Theatrum (1710) that Amodei studied with the Maestro di Cappela in Sciacca and violinist Don Accursius Giuffrida; Amodei was purportedly his most talented pupil. The priest Vincenzo Farnia wrote in his 1897 Biografie di uomini illustri nati a Sciacca (Biographies of illustrious men born in Sciacca) that Amodei went to Naples "for the honor that the city is accorded by all the nations as being the mistress of melody" in 1669–70. However, records indicate that Amodei was still in Sciacca; he is first recorded in Naples in 1679, though he may have arrived there between 1670 and 1679.

=== Naples ===
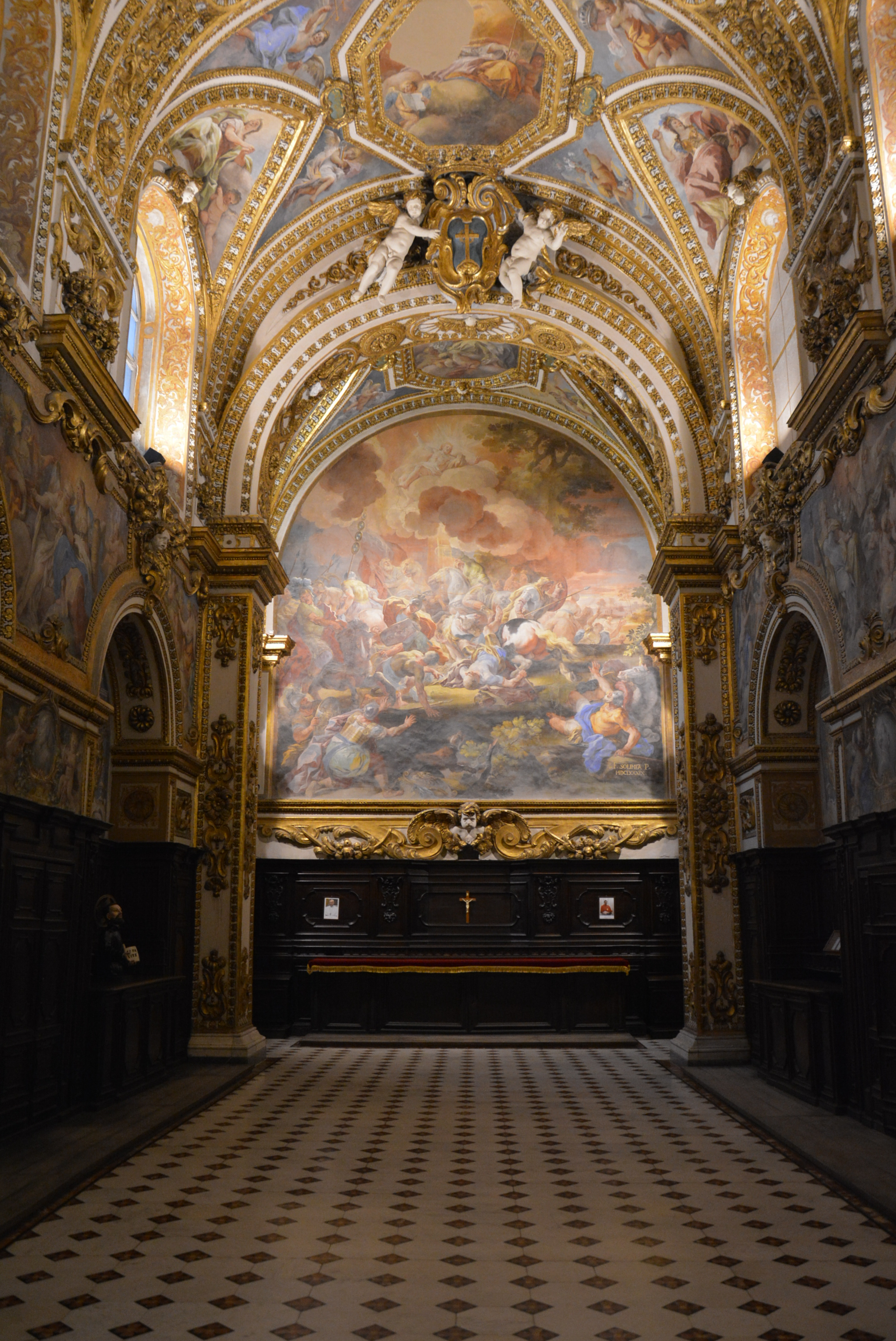
The frescos on the sacristy of San Paolo Maggiore by Francesco Solimena, created in 1690 while Amodei prepared music for the Feast of Saint Gaetano.

In Naples, Amodei was ordained a priest and presumably completed his musical education, the details of which are not extant. In March 1680, Amodei succeeded Filippo Coppola as maestro di cappella (choirmaster) of the Theatine church San Paolo Maggiore. (Note: New research in D'Alessandro 2019, pp. 170–176 gives March 1680 as the date and Filippo Coppola as Amodei's predecessor for the San Paolo Maggiore post. Prior to this D'Alessandro 2003, p. XLVII reported that it was unknown who preceded him and when Amodei obtained his post at San Paolo Maggiore; he was only known to have been employed there by 1685.) In particular, Amodei worked for San Paolo Maggiore until his death, regularly making and performing music; for their services he wrote at least four ontarios: L'innocenza infetta dal pomo, Il flagello dell'empietà, La Susanna and Il Giosuè vittorioso. According to Sanfilippo-Galiotto, by at least 1685 he gained an additional post of maestro di cappella at the Dominican Collegio di San Tommaso d'Aquino. D'Alessandro notes that records indicate Amodei was actively involved in the music of San Paolo Maggiore, while it remains uncertain whether his other ecclesiastical appointments were occasional or regular. At the church, a Pastorale by Amodei was performed for Christmas 1688, which may be the surviving Pastorale per la novena del Signore for four voices.

In 1680/81, (Note: Amodei's appointment at the Conservatorio di Sant'Onofrio a Porta Capuana is traditionally recorded as beginning in 1681. However, D'Alessandro argues this is the result of printing error, and the actual date is 1680, see note 10 in D'Alessandro (2003, p. XLVI)) Amodei succeeded Pietro Andrea Ziani as maestro di cappella at the Conservatorio di Sant'Onofrio a Porta Capuana, one of four major musical institutions of the city. (Note: The four major musical institutions of Naples were the Conservatorio di Sant'Onofrio a Porta Capuana, the Conservatorio Santa Maria di Loreto, Conservatorio di Saint Maria della Pietà dei Turchini and the Conservatorio dei Poveri di Gesù Cristo. The Casa dell'Annunziata was also an important center for musical learning.) He received the additional position of second maestro di cappella at the Conservatorio Santa Maria di Loreto—another of the major institutions—on 14 September 1687. This post was to assist the primary maestro di cappella Nicola Acerbo, who was finding difficulty in teaching over a hundred students alone. Instructing the students in harpsichord and voice, (Note: Records describe it as "to teach the boys, in the morning, to play and sing".) the governors raised his pay to a ducat over even Acerbo, perhaps in light of his renown as a musician. Upon his obtainment of the Loreto post, governors' records praise Amodei, declaring him "one of the outstanding personalities of the city". (Note: D'Alessandro (2003, p. XLVII) prefers the translation of "one of the leading figures of this town") Amodei left his position at Sant'Onofrio in 1688 and was succeeded by Cristoforo Caresana—D'Alessandro suggested that he was exhausted from a year of two simultaneous conservatory positions. The February of the following year, he resigned from his post at Santa Maria di Loreto, reportedly "because of his many commitments", and was succeeded there by Alessandro Scarlatti.

Amodei was known as a colleague of Francesco Provenzale, who is often considered the founder of the Neapolitan School, and was probably acquainted with A. Scarlatti. After his time at the conservatories he may have offered private lessons; it is unclear if his student Francesco Bajada was from a conservatory or private pupil. Francesco Solimena painted the sacristy of San Paolo Maggiore throughout 1690, during which Amodei prepared music for the Feast of Saint Gaetano there. He presumably assisted with the music for subsequent feasts at San Paolo Maggiore, including the Feast Day for the Madonna of Purity (8 September) and Andrew Avellino (10 November). (Note: See D'Alessandro (2003, pp. LV–LVI) for a detailed account of the many feasts and their musical forces) On 13 July 1693, Amodei died in Naples. The city newspaper reported on this the following day: "Yesterday, to universal mourning, the famous Maestro di Cappella of san Paolo, Sig D. Cataldo Omodei [sic] passed away. He was a fine exponent of his profession." The historian Bonaventura Sanfilippo-Galiotto described Amodei as:

"Cataldo Amodei, the most excellent Maestro di Cappella of San Paolo Maggiore of the Order of Regular Clerics in the City of Naples, and of the Collegio di San Tommaso d'Aquino of the Dominican Fathers and of the Royal Conservatory of Sant'Onofrio who wrote an infinite number of compositions"

— Bonaventura Sanfilippo-Galiotto, 1710, chapter 27 of Sacrum Xacca Theatrum

== Music ==
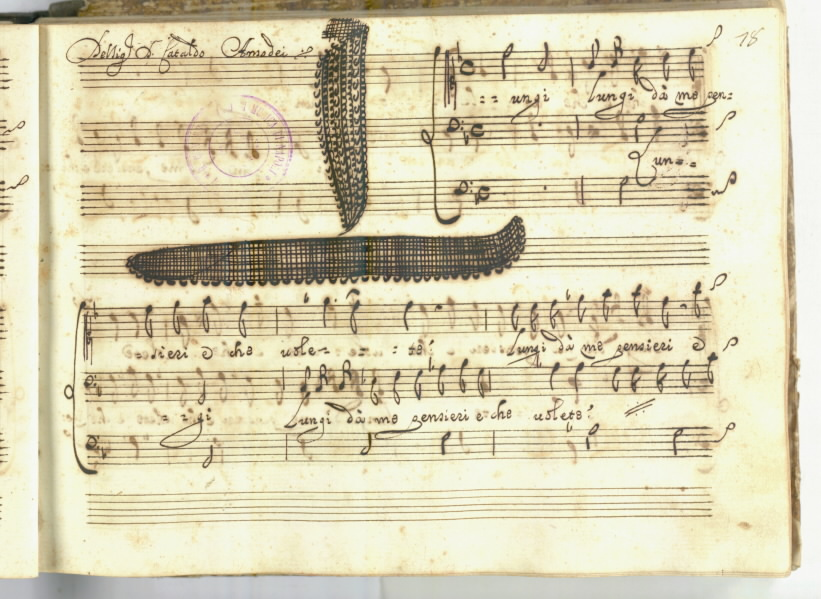
The first page of Amodei's duet, Lungi da me, pensieri. The composer's signature can be seen in the top left

=== Overview ===
Amodei's compositions consist of oratorios, motets and cantatas. Almost all of Amodei's works were published in Naples, usually being printed by Novello De Bonis and their "stampator arcivescovile" ("archiepiscopal printer"). Novello De Bonis's editions of music by Amodei show them—like Mascardi in Rome—attempting to use a three-systems layout to fit more musical notation per page.

Amodei set text by Andrea Perrucci twice; first for the 1686 oratorio La Susanna and later for 1692 serenata La sirena consolata. Musicologist Dinko Fabris noted that both Amodei and Perrucci were Sicilians who moved to Naples.

=== Cantatas ===
18th-century Naples was an active site of cantata production, first with composers such as A. Scarlatti, Francesco Mancini and Domenico Sarro. Amodei's cantatas were the most significant predecessor to this. Amodei stands with the elder Provenzale and younger A. Scarlatti as among the principal Italian composers of cantatas. His book of 1685 cantatas, Cantate Op. 2, is the earliest book of cantatas to be printed in Naples; the next single cantata was Antion del Ricco's Urania armonica. Cantate a voce sola, Op. 1 of 1686 and the next book was Pergolesi's Quattro cantate da camera of around 1736. The work's full title is Cantate a voce sola, libro primo, opera seconda, di Cataldo Amodei, maestro di cappella di San Paolo Maggiore de' molto reverendi Padri Teatini, del Collegio di San Tomaso d'Aquino de' molto reverendi Padri Domenicani, d del Real Conservatorio di S. Honofrio di Napoli. Unlike earlier Italian cantatas such as the anonymous Squarciato appena havea and L'amante impazzito con altre Cantate, e Serenate a solo, et a due con violini (1679) by Milanese composer Simone Coya, Amodei's Cantate are particularly virtuosic and do not conform to the earlier Italian archetype of ironically setting popular tunes to serious subjects. Musicologist Alfred Einstein favorably compared Amodei's cantata "L'interesse" from the Op. 2 to Richard Wagner's Der Ring des Nibelungen. Einstein explained:

"This is, in a way, a distant ancestor of Wagner's Ring. Both embody revolt against capitalism. Amodei's horrible representation of Interest foreshadows the giant Fafner who 'sits in possession:' only instead of Wagner's redemption through love, he invites us piously to raise our eyes to heaven. The music has a distinct expressive value."

=== Oratorios ===
Amodei's four oratorios, L'innocenza infetta dal pomo, Il flagello dell'empietà, La Susanna and Il Giosuè vittorioso are important works in establishing the form and content of Italian oratorios. Described by musicologists Rosa Cafiero and Marina Marino as "rather homogeneous" ("piuttosto omogeneo)", the works were all written for San Paolo Maggiore and share subject matter and musical form. They are thus exemplary to the Italian oratorio's increasing tendency to have its subject matter, structure, patronage and performance aligned.

During the beginning of the 17th century, librettists were typically more prominent than composers, with the latter more likely to be anonymous. Only one of the oratorios—La Susanna—has a librettist listed (Perrucci), suggesting a switch in the dominance of composers and librettists.

=== Others ===
Primo libro de' mottetti (First Book of Motets; 1679), his Op. 1 motets for 2–5 voices, was dedicated to Leopold I, Holy Roman Emperor. The motet's 1679 publication was the first published music in Naples since a 1645–1653 series of various first editions and reprints by composers such as Bartolomeo Cappello, Giovanni Salvatore and Francesco Vannarelli.

== Works ==
List of compositions by Cataldo Amodei
Title	Year	Genre	Occasion	Notes
Primo libro de' mottetti, op. 1 (First Book of Motets)	1679	Motet (2–5 voices)	Dedicated to Leopold I, Holy Roman Emperor	–
Cantate, libro primo, op. 2 (Note: Full title: Cantate a voce sola, libro primo, opera seconda, di Cataldo Amodei, maestro di cappella di San Paolo Maggiore de' molto reverendi Padri Teatini, del Collegio di San Tomaso d'Aquino de' molto reverendi Padri Domenicani, d del Real Conservatorio di S. Honofrio di Napoli) (Cantatas, First Book)	1685	Cantata (1 voice)	–	–
L'innocenza infetta dal pomo (Innocence Infects the Apple)	1685	Oratorio (2 voices)	For San Paolo Maggiore	Based on Original Sin
Il flagello dell'empietà (The Scourge of Wickedness)	1685	Oratorio (1 voice)	For San Paolo Maggiore	–
La Susanna (The Susanna)	1686	Oratorio	For San Paolo Maggiore	Based on Susanna and the Elders; Text from Andrea Perrucci and Fardella
Il Giosuè vittorioso (The Victorious Joshua)	1687	Oratorio (1 voice)	For San Paolo Maggiore; Pentecost	Music lost (Note: Four librettos survive, now located in the Biblioteca Estense, Modena; the library of the Conservatorio di San Pietro a Majella, Naples; the Biblioteca Nazionale Vittorio Emanuele III, Naples; and the Biblioteca Civica of Padua.); Libretto survived Printed by Carlo Porsile
Il trionfo della purità di Maria (The Triumph of Mary's Purity)	1687/88 (Note: Bossa (2001) records 1687 while Cafiero & Marino (1987, p. 487) records 1688)	"Componimento per musica" (4 voices)	–	Manuscript at the Biblioteca Nazionale Vittorio Emanuele III
La sirena consolata (Note: Full title: La sirena consolata, Serenata per la ricuperata salute della Maestà Cattolica di Marianna di Neoburgo portata in musica da Cataldo Amodei) (The Consoled Siren)	1692	Serenata	–	Lost; Text from Andrea Perrucci
Pastorale	1688	Pastorale	Christmas 1686–1690	—
Pastorale per la novena del Signore (Note: The Pastorale per la novena del Signore may be the same Pastorale by Amodei which was performed at San Paolo Maggiore for Christmas 1688.)	?	Pastorale (4 voices)	?	Set to the "Rorate caeli" text Acomp. two violins and organ basso continuo
Confitebor tibi Domine	?	Psalm	?	Acomp. two violins and organ basso continuo
Laetaus sum	?	Psalm	?	Acomp. two violins and organ basso continuo

=== Editions ===
Amodei's works are included in the following collections:

- D'Alessandro, Domenico Antonio; Colusso, Flavio [in Italian], eds. (2003). Composizioni liturgiche: Cataldo Amodei [Liturgical compositions: Cataldo Amodei]. Musica Theatina. Vol. 1. Lucca: Libreria Musicale Italiana. OCLC 639148255.
- Giuseppe, Collisani, ed. (2008). Cataldo Amodei: Cinque duetti concertati per Soprano e Basso [Cataldo Amodei: Five Concerted Duets for Soprano and Bass]. Dafni. Vol. 11. Palermo: Mnemes. ISBN 978-88-8161-245-1. OCLC 268784308.

== Recordings ==
Numerous cantatas by Amodei were recorded in Cataldo Amodei: Cantatas (2004) by soprano Emma Kirkby, lutenist Jakob Lindberg and harpsichordist Lars Ulrik Mortensen. Three of these recordings were rereleased in The Artistry of Emma Kirkby (2009).

Cultural offices
Preceded by Pietro Andrea Ziani	Choirmaster of the San Paolo Maggiore; 1680/81–1688	Succeeded by Gaetano Veneziano
Preceded by Pietro Andrea Ziani	Choirmaster of the Conservatorio di Sant'Onofrio a Porta Capuana; 1681–1688	Succeeded by Cristoforo Caresana
Preceded by Nicola Acerbo	Choirmaster of the Conservatorio Santa Maria di Loreto; 14 September 1687 – 1689	Succeeded by Alessandro Scarlatti
