= Neapolitan School =

Italian Music School

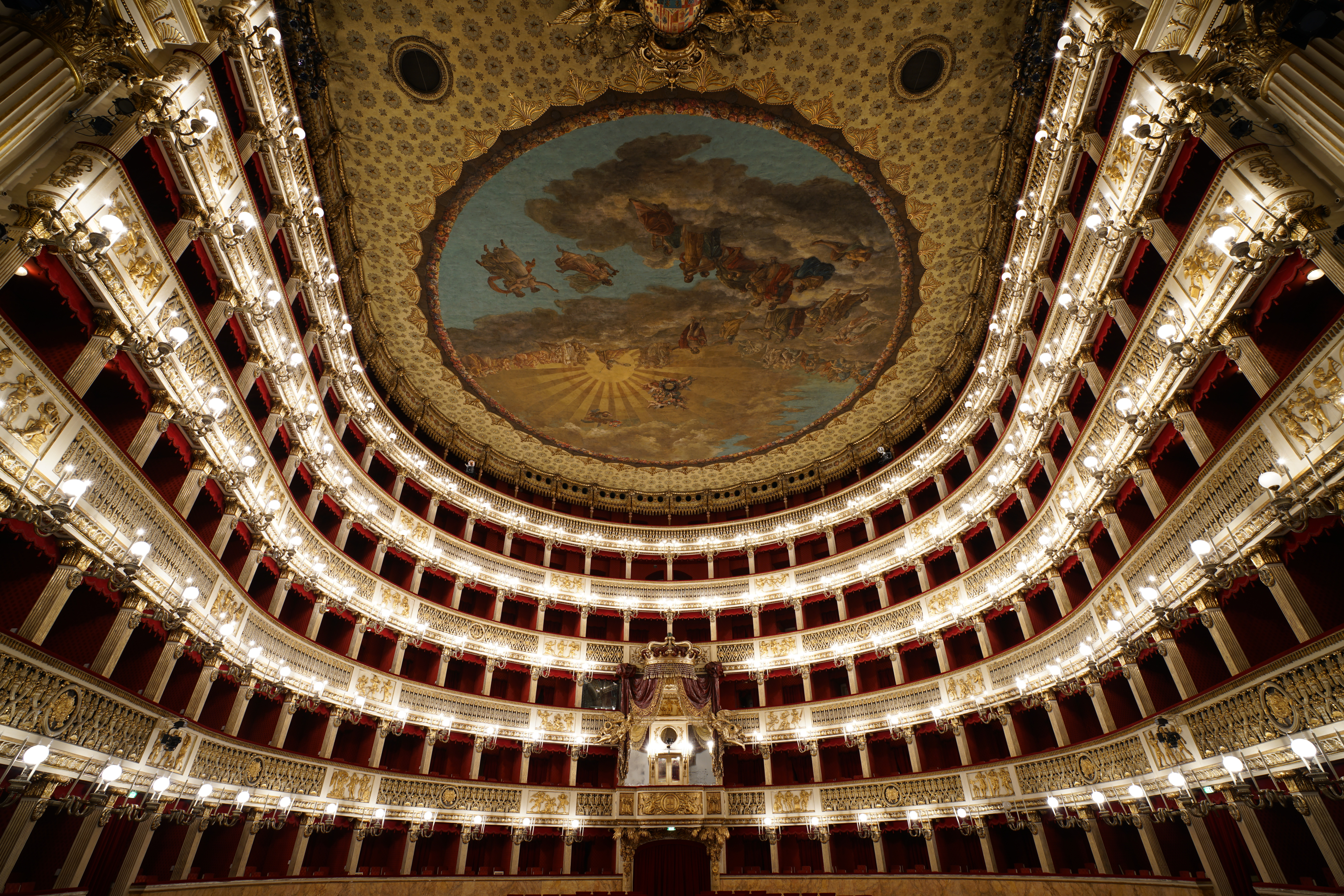
Teatro di San Carlo, Naples, Italy.

In music history, the Neapolitan School is a group, associated with opera, of 17th and 18th-century composers who studied or worked in Naples, Italy, the best known of whom is Alessandro Scarlatti, with whom "modern opera begins". Francesco Provenzale is generally considered the school's founder. Other significant composers of this school are Giovanni Battista Pergolesi, Niccolò Piccinni, Domenico Cimarosa and Giovanni Paisiello. It also addressed other musical genres, particularly the oratorio and the concerto.

It is with the Neapolitan school...that the History of Modern Music commences—insofar as that music speaks the language of the feelings, emotions, and passions.

— Schluter

The Neapolitan School has been considered in between the Roman School and the Venetian School in importance.

However, "The concept of Neapolitan school, or more particularly Neapolitan opera, has been questioned by a number of scholars. That Naples was a significant musical center in the 18th century is beyond doubt. Whether the composers working in Naples at that time developed or partook of a distinct and characteristic musical style is less clear" since so little is known about the repertory.

== Background ==
In the second half of the 17th century, a more purist and classicist style began in Naples, with simplified plots and more cultured and sophisticated operas. At that time, Naples was a Spanish possession, and opera enjoyed the patronage of the Spanish viceroys, especially the Count of Oñate. Neapolitan opera introduced numerous innovations to the genre, including the differentiation between opera seria and opera buffa. Its founder, principal representative, and introducer of the main operatic reforms was the Palermo-born Alessandro Scarlatti. The school lasted until the end of the 18th century and practically disappeared with the advent of Romanticism.

== Characteristics ==
The birth of the Neapolitan School is situated in the Baroque period. When it emerged, less than a century had passed since the birth of opera, as an initiative of a circle of scholars, the Camerata Fiorentina, who, upon discovering that ancient Greek theater was sung, had the idea of setting dramatic texts to music. Thus, Jacopo Peri created Dafne (1597), followed by Euridice (1600), by the same author. Between the 17th century and the first half of the 18th century, the Baroque developed, a period in which cultivated music was reserved for social elites but produced new and rich musical forms, and saw the establishment of a proper language for opera, which gained richness and complexity not only in compositional and vocal methods but also in theatrical and scenic production. Baroque opera stood out for its complicated, ornate, overloaded scenery, with sudden changes and complex lighting and sensory effects. Numerous sets were used, up to fifteen or twenty scene changes per performance. The taste for solo voices began, mainly high ones (tenor, soprano), which paralleled the phenomenon of the castrati, singers who, standing out as children for their voice, were castrated before puberty so that their voice would not change, thus maintaining a high voice close to the female one.

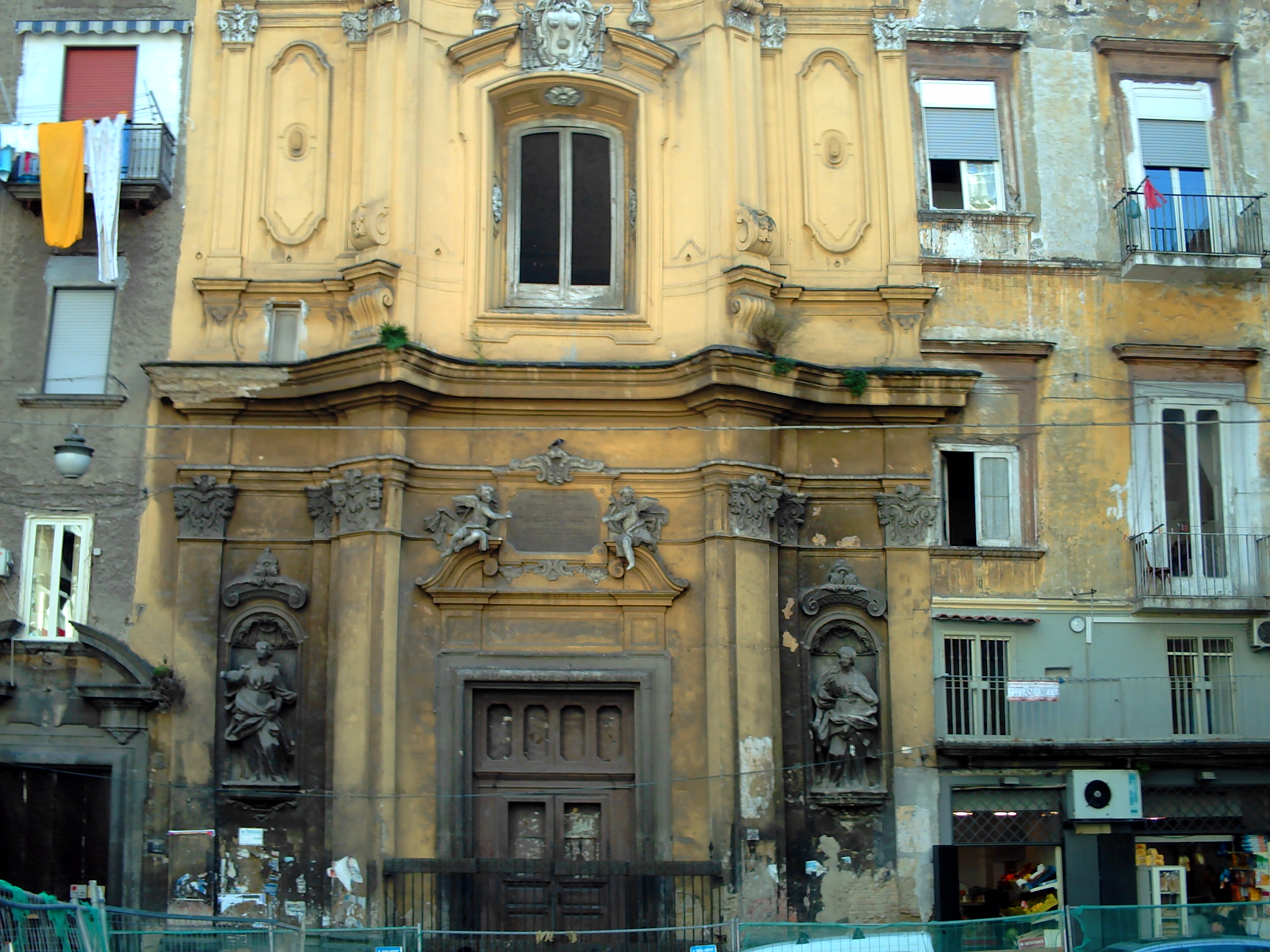
Church of Santa Maria della Colonna, where the Conservatorio dei Poveri di Gesù Cristo was located

In Italy, after the first experiences of the Camerata Fiorentina, the Venetian school stood out, the first place where music detached from religious or aristocratic protection to be performed in public venues. In Venice emerged the concept of bel canto, which became popular especially in the 19th century.

After Venice, the focus of operatic creation centered on Naples. Among the main innovations of Neapolitan opera is the differentiation between two types of recitative: secco, a declaimed song with basso continuo accompaniment; and accompagnato, a melodic song with orchestral music. Comic characters were eliminated, which in turn led to the inclusion of comic intermezzi that, already in the 18th century, gave rise to opera buffa.

The main innovations were introduced by Alessandro Scarlatti: he created the three-part aria (da capo aria), with a theme-variation-theme (ABA) structure; theatricalized the siciliana aria (infusing it with the passionate melodic style of his native Palermo); reduced vocal ornamentations and eliminated improvisations often performed by singers; he also reduced recitatives and lengthened arias, in a recitative-aria alternation, and added a type of shorter arias (cavatina) to give greater speed to the work, performed by secondary characters; on the other hand, together with his usual librettist, Apostolo Zeno, he eliminated comic characters and interleaved plots, following only the original story.

For musical education, there were four conservatories in Naples at the end of the 17th century: Pietà dei Turchini, Santa Maria de Loreto, I Poveri di Gesù Cristo, and Sant'Onofrio a Capuana. Operatic performances began in the theater of the Viceregal Palace of Naples, until the Teatro San Bartolomeo was inaugurated in 1620, which closed after the creation of a larger new theater: the Teatro San Carlo, inaugurated in 1737, one of the most prestigious in the world. There were also other minor theaters: Teatro dei Fiorentini (1709), Teatro Nuovo (1724–1878), Teatro del Fondo (1779, current Mercadante), and Teatro San Ferdinando (1790).

== Beginnings ==
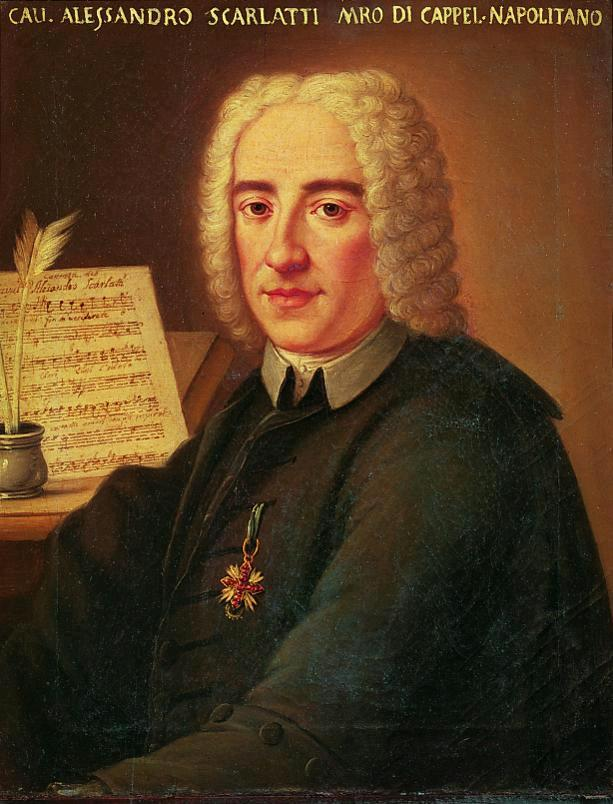
Alessandro Scarlatti

One of the first composers of the school was Francesco Provenzale, author of Lo schiavo di sua moglie (1672) and Difendere l'offensore overo La Stellidaura vendicante (1674). Alessandro Stradella is also considered a precursor of this type of opera, despite composing most of his operas in Genoa: Trespolo tutore (1677), La forza dell'amor patterno (1678), La gare dell'amor eroico (1679).

Its main representative was Alessandro Scarlatti, who was maestro di cappella for Christina, Queen of Sweden and the Viceroy of Naples, as well as director of the Teatro San Bartolomeo. 114 operas by Scarlatti are known, among which stand out: Il Mitridate Eupatore (1707), Tigrane (1715), Il trionfo dell'onore (1718), and Griselda (1721). His son Domenico Scarlatti also composed operas: L'Ottavia restituita al soglio (1703), La Dirindina (1715).

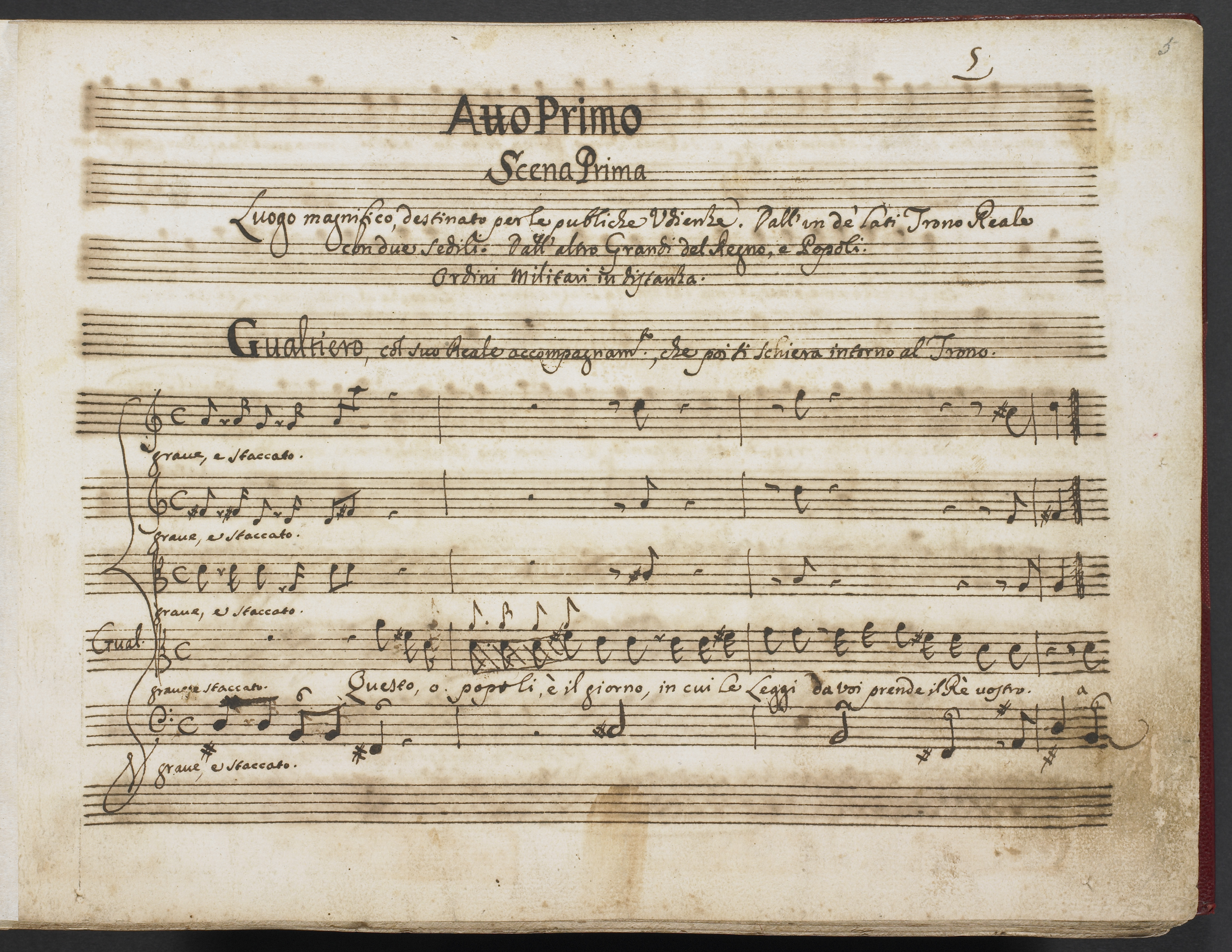
Manuscript score by Alessandro Scarlatti of the opera Griselda (1721), act I, scene I

Another outstanding exponent was Giovanni Battista Pergolesi. He died at twenty-six but had a successful career. In 1732 he composed his first opera, La Salustia, which failed, and Lo frate 'nnamorato, of comic genre, which achieved notable success. The following year he premiered Il prigionier superbo, in whose intermedios the comic work La serva padrona was performed, which achieved more success than the main work. In 1734 he composed Adriano in Siria, with libretto by Pietro Metastasio, in whose intermedios the comic work Livietta e Tracollo was performed, which achieved more success than the main work. The following year he premiered L'Olimpiade, still with libretto by Metastasio, and his last work, Il Flaminio, of comic genre, which achieved notable success.

Nicola Porpora was a singing teacher—he had as students Farinelli and Caffarelli—and composition—among his disciples was Johann Adolph Hasse. He was one of the first to set librettos by Pietro Metastasio to music. Among his early operas are Agrippina (1708), Arianna e Teseo (1714), and Angelica (1720). In 1726 he moved to Venice and, in 1733, to London, where he was musical director of the Opera of the Nobility located at the King's Theatre, where he premiered Arianna in Nasso (1733). Later he worked in Dresden, where he premiered Filandro (1747), as well as Vienna, before returning to Naples, where he died in poverty.

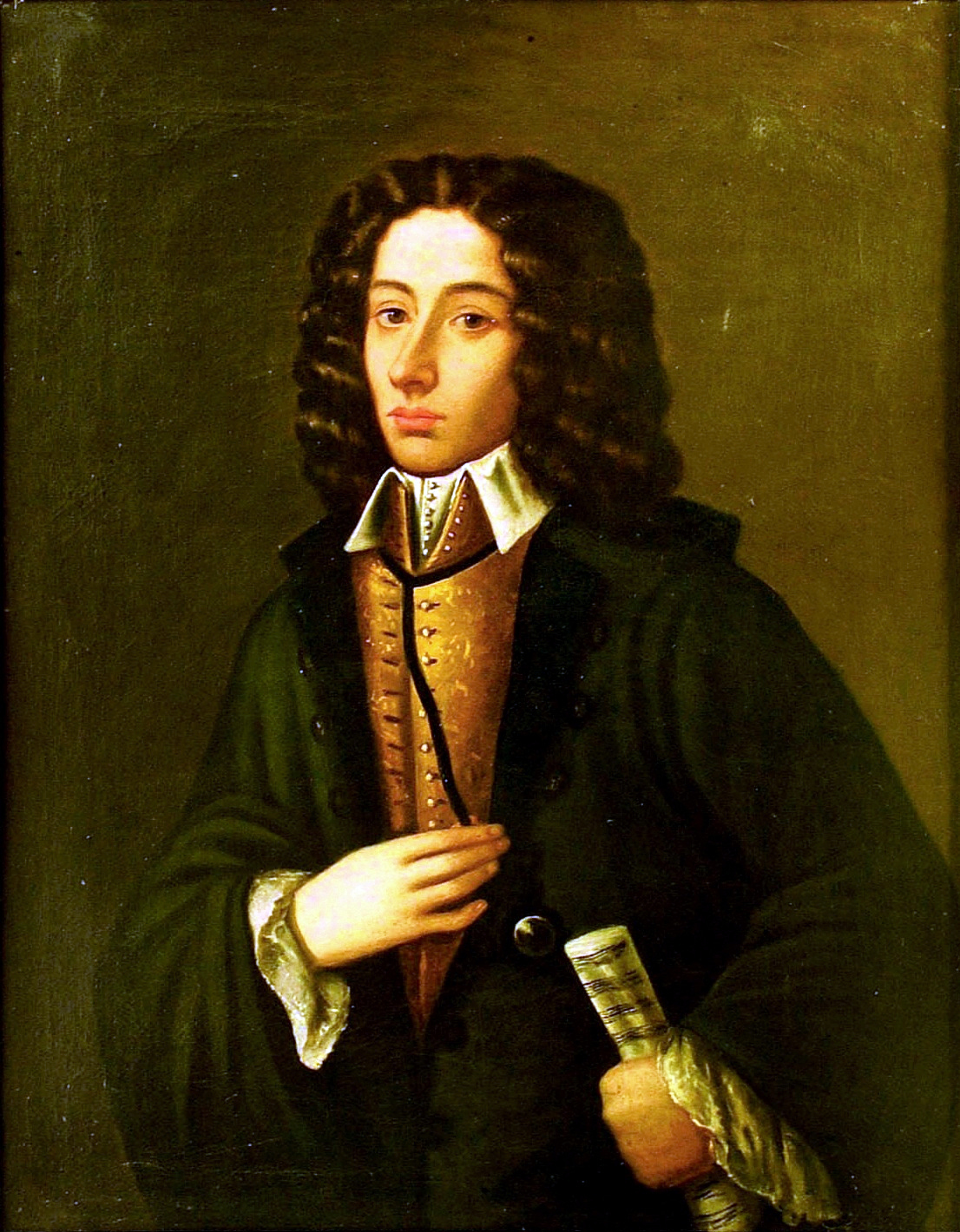
Giovanni Battista Pergolesi

Other distinguished representatives were Leonardo Vinci, Leonardo Leo, and Giovanni Bononcini. Vinci debuted at twenty-three with Lo cecato fauzo (The False Blind Man, 1719). In 1722 he composed Li zite 'ngalera (The Lovers in the Galley), of comic genre. That same year he achieved great success with Publio Cornelio Scipione, which led him toward opera seria. In 1724 he renewed his success with Farnace, which took him to Rome and Venice. Followed by Didone abbandonata and Siroe, re di Persia, both from 1726 and with libretto by Pietro Metastasio. Until his death in 1730 he composed two operas per year, among which stand out Alessandro nell'Indie and Artaserse, both from 1730 and again with librettos by Metastasio.

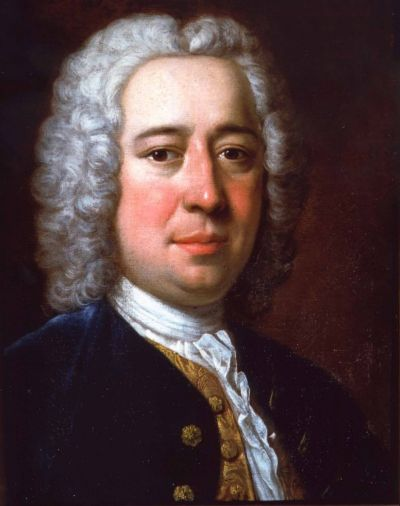
Nicola Porpora

Leo was an organist and church musician. His first opera was Il Pisistrate (1714), at nineteen. In 1725 he was appointed organist of the viceroy's chapel in Naples. His works were more conservative than those of Vinci and Porpora, largely based on counterpoint. Among them stands out L'Olimpiade (1737), with libretto by Metastasio. He also composed several comic operas, to which he gave respectability by the effort put into them.

Bononcini had great initial success with Il trionfo di Camilla (1696, with libretto by Silvio Stampiglia), which was performed in nineteen Italian cities. In 1697 he settled in Vienna, in the service of Emperor Joseph I, until in 1719 he was hired by the Royal Academy of Music in London. Among his works stand out Gli affetti più grandi vinti dal più giusto (1701), Griselda (1722), and Zenobia (1737).

Also worth mentioning: Francesco Feo (L'amor tirannico, 1713; Siface, 1723; Ipermestra, 1724), Gaetano Latilla (Angelica e Orlando, 1735) and Francesco Mancini (L'Alfonso, 1699; Idaspe fedele, 1710; Traiano, 1721).

Lastly, Francesco Durante should be mentioned, a distinguished composer who was one of the few of his time who did not dedicate himself to opera. He was a teacher at the Conservatorio Sant'Onofrio in Naples, where he had as students Pergolesi, Piccinni, Jommelli, and Paisiello. He preferred religious music, as well as sonatas, toccatas, concertante quartets, and concertos, with a somewhat austere but greatly elegant and clear style, pointing toward classical forms.

== Opera seria and buffa ==
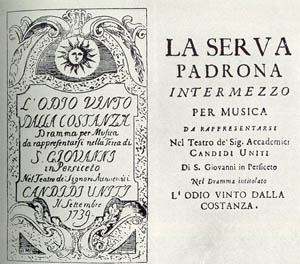
La serva padrona by Giovanni Battista Pergolesi (1733), contemporary edition of the libretto

Around the second quarter of the 18th century, opera gradually divided into two opposing genres: opera seria and opera buffa. The themes of opera seria were generally drawn from classical mythology, with a moralistic component, showing the most virtuous side of ancient heroes. Generally, the action centered on recitatives and arias were left for lyrical incursions by singers, with preference for the da capo aria, which lived its golden age. Opera seria sought to strip lyric dramas of the extravagances and convoluted plots used until then, with a soberer style inspired by ancient Greek theater.

However, the disappearance of comic characters left a certain void in a sector of the public, generally lower class, who liked these characters. To satisfy them, intermezzi were introduced in the entr'actes of the works, which gradually gained success until they became separate works. A good example was La serva padrona by Pergolesi (1733). From then on, these intermezzi became independent and turned into their own spectacles. Opera buffa was comic genre, intended for a more popular audience, with influence from commedia dell'arte. It included arias and recitatives, but with second-tier performers, who sang with their natural voices, without castrati or sopranos. The arias were shorter and the recitatives maintained music, unlike Spanish zarzuela or German singspiel, which included spoken parts only. There were also duets, trios, and quartets, absent from opera seria. The music, generally strings, was simple, from small orchestras, although over time it would equal that of opera seria. Over time, both genres tended to merge, giving rise to opera semiseria or dramma giocoso.

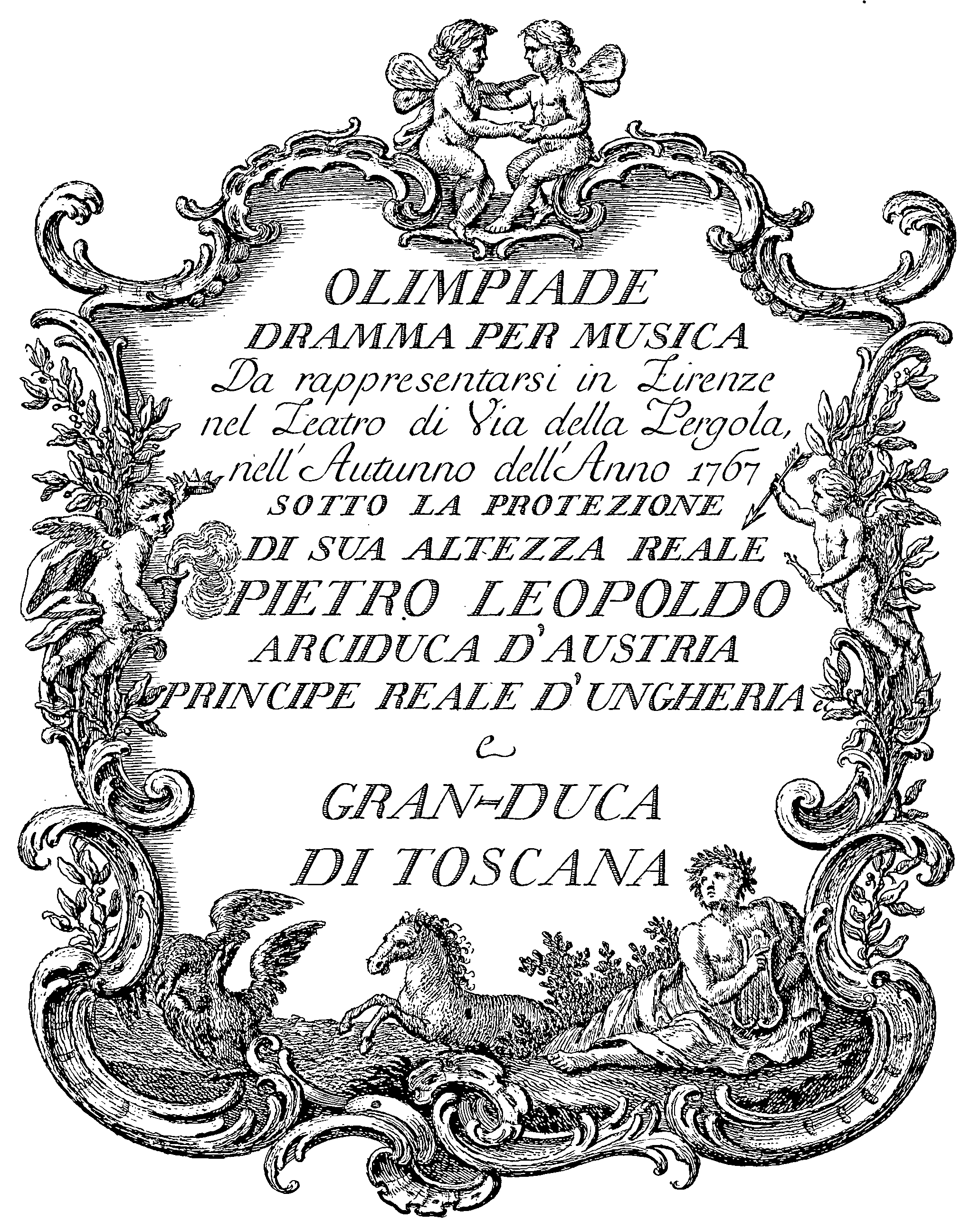
Title page of the libretto of L'Olimpiade (1767), by Tommaso Traetta.

In the field of opera seria, Niccolò Jommelli and Tommaso Traetta stood out. Jommelli premiered his first operas in Naples: L'errore amoroso (1737), Ricimero (1740), and Astianatte (1741). After gaining fame for these works, he was appointed maestro di cappella at St. Peter's Basilica in 1749 and, four years later, the same position in Stuttgart, for the Duke of Württemberg. In Germany he composed thirty-three operas, and his style became so Germanized that upon returning to his homeland his works were rejected by the public.

Traetta received Gluckian influence, which he combined with his prodigious ability to compose choruses and elegant melodies. His first compositions were for opera theaters in Naples and Parma (Ippolito e Aricia, 1759; Ifigenia in Tauride, 1763). In 1765 he moved to Venice and, in 1768, to Russia, appointed opera director by Empress Catherine II. There he composed, among others, Antigone (1772).

Also noteworthy are Gian Francesco de Majo and Davide Perez. The former began with Ricimero, re dei Goti (1759) and L'Almeria (1761). He spent time in Mannheim, where he premiered Ifigenia in Tauride (1764), which influenced Gluck. Back in Naples, he produced L'Ulisse (1769) and L'eroe cinese (1770). Perez, of Spanish origin, composed some opera buffas (La nemica amante, 1735), but mainly serias: Siroe (1740), Astarto (1743), Merope (1744), La clemenza di Tito (1749), Demofoonte (1752), Olimpiade (1754), Solimano (1757).

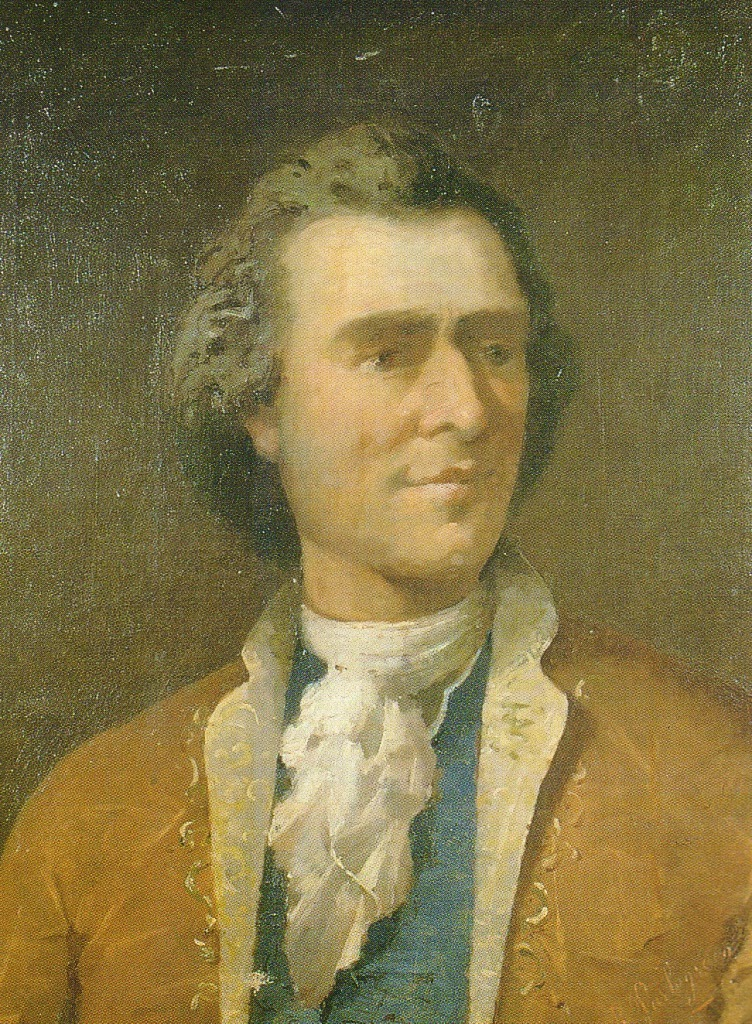
Domenico Terradellas

Also to be mentioned is Francesco Araja, settled in Russia in the service of Empress Catherine II, where he premiered various operas: Il finto Nino, ossia La Semiramide riconosciutta (1737), Artaserse (1738), Russia afitta e consolata (1742), Seleuco (1744). He was also author of the first opera written in Russian, Tsefal i Prokris (Cephalus and Procris, 1755).

The Spaniard Domenico Terradellas (also known in Italian as Domenico Terradeglias) is considered part of the Neapolitan School. He studied in Naples, where he was a student of Francesco Durante. In 1736 he premiered his first opera, Giuseppe riconosciuto. He moved to Rome, where he was maestro di cappella at San Giacomo degli Spagnoli and premiered Astarto (1739), Merope (1743), and Semiramide riconosciuta (1746). He then went to London, where he composed Mitridate (1746) and Bellerofonte (1747). Back in Italy, he premiered in Turin Didone (1750), in Venice Imeneo in Atene (1750), and in Rome Sesostri (1751).

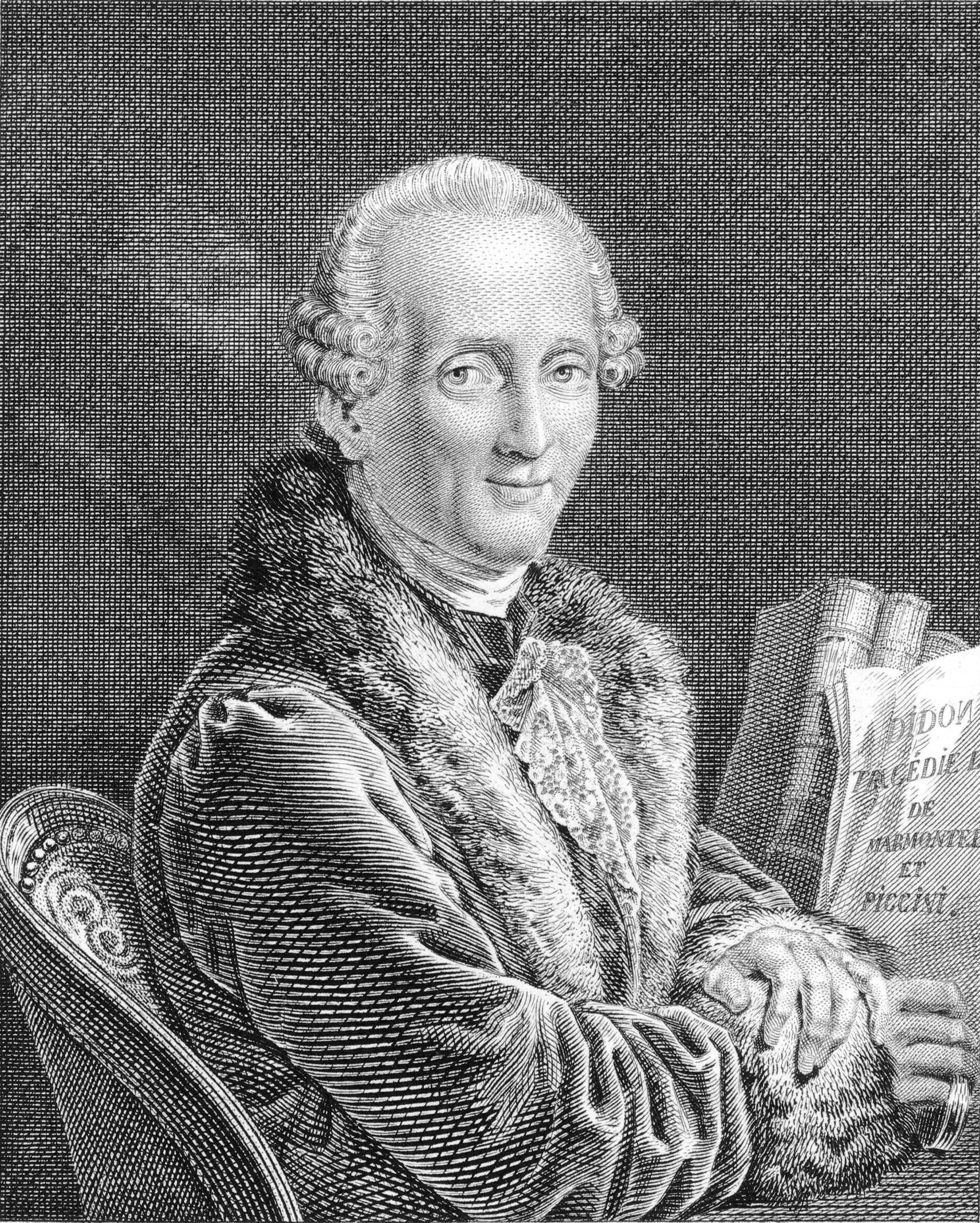
Niccolò Piccinni

Likewise, the German Johann Adolph Hasse was related to the Neapolitan School. He studied in Naples with Scarlatti. His first opera was Antioco (1721), at twenty-two, followed by Sesostrate (1726) and La sorella amante (1729). In 1730 he premiered in Venice Artaserse, which was innovative for its expressive contrasts allowing great display by singers. That year he was appointed director of the Dresden Opera, where he was one of the main promoters of opera seria. He left about seventy operas.

Other representatives of the late Baroque Neapolitan School were: Girolamo Abos (Artaserse, 1746; Alessandro nell'Indie, 1747), Pasquale Cafaro (La disfatta di Dario, 1756; Creso, 1768), Ignazio Fiorillo (L'Olimpiade, 1745), Pietro Alessandro Guglielmi (L'Olimpiade, 1763; Farnace, 1765; Sesostri, 1766; Alceste, 1768) Giacomo Insanguine (L'osteria di Marechiaro, 1768; Didone abbandonata, 1770), Pietro Domenico Paradisi (Alessandro in Persia, 1738; Le muse in gara, 1740; Fetonte 1747; La Forza d'amore, 1751) and Antonio Sacchini (La contadina in corte, 1765).

Among opera buffa composers, Niccolò Piccinni stood out. He was a prolific composer, author of about 120 works. He began his career with Le donne dispettose (1754). His greatest success was La Cecchina, ossia La buona figliuola (1760), with libretto by Carlo Goldoni, based on Pamela by Samuel Richardson, often considered the first opera semiseria. In 1776 he was invited to Paris, where he maintained a tense rivalry with Gluck: both composed an Iphigénie en Tauride, but Gluck's opera (1779) was more successful than Piccinni's (1781). Piccinni introduced the rondo aria, which had a two-part structure slow and fast, repeated twice.

Other opera buffa authors were: Pasquale Anfossi (La finta giardiniera, 1774; La maga Circe, 1788), Gennaro Astarita (Il corsaro algerino, 1765; L'astuta cameriera, 1770), Francesco Coradini (Lo 'ngiegno de le femmine, 1724; L'oracolo di Dejana, 1725), Domenico Fischietti (Il mercato di Malmantile, 1756), Giuseppe Gazzaniga (Don Giovanni Tenorio, 1787), Nicola Logroscino (Il governatore, 1747) and Giacomo Tritto (La fedeltà in amore, 1764).

== Classicism ==
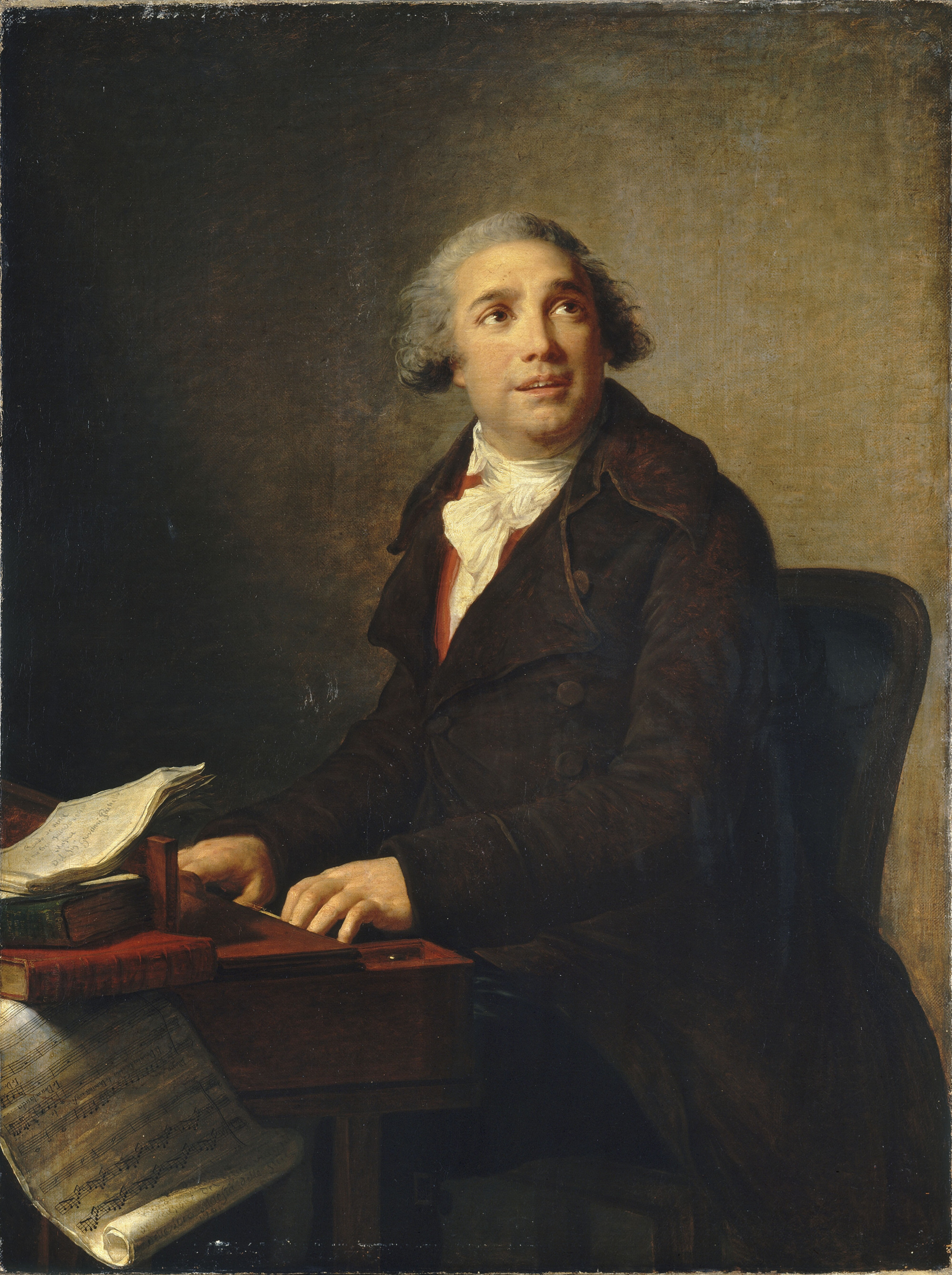
Giovanni Paisiello

Between the last third of the 18th century and the beginning of the 19th century, Classical music emerged—not to be confused with the general concept of "classical music" understood as vocal and instrumental music of cultivated tradition produced from the Middle Ages to the present—which represented the culmination of instrumental forms, consolidated with the definitive structuring of the modern orchestra. Classicism manifested in the balance and serenity of composition, the search for formal beauty, perfection, in harmonious forms inspiring high values. A universal musical language was sought, a harmonization between form and musical content. The public's taste began to be valued, leading to a new way of producing musical works, as well as new forms of patronage. Opera continued to enjoy great popularity, although it underwent gradual evolution in line with novelties introduced by classicism. The orchestra expanded and instrumental music gained increasing prominence over the vocal line.

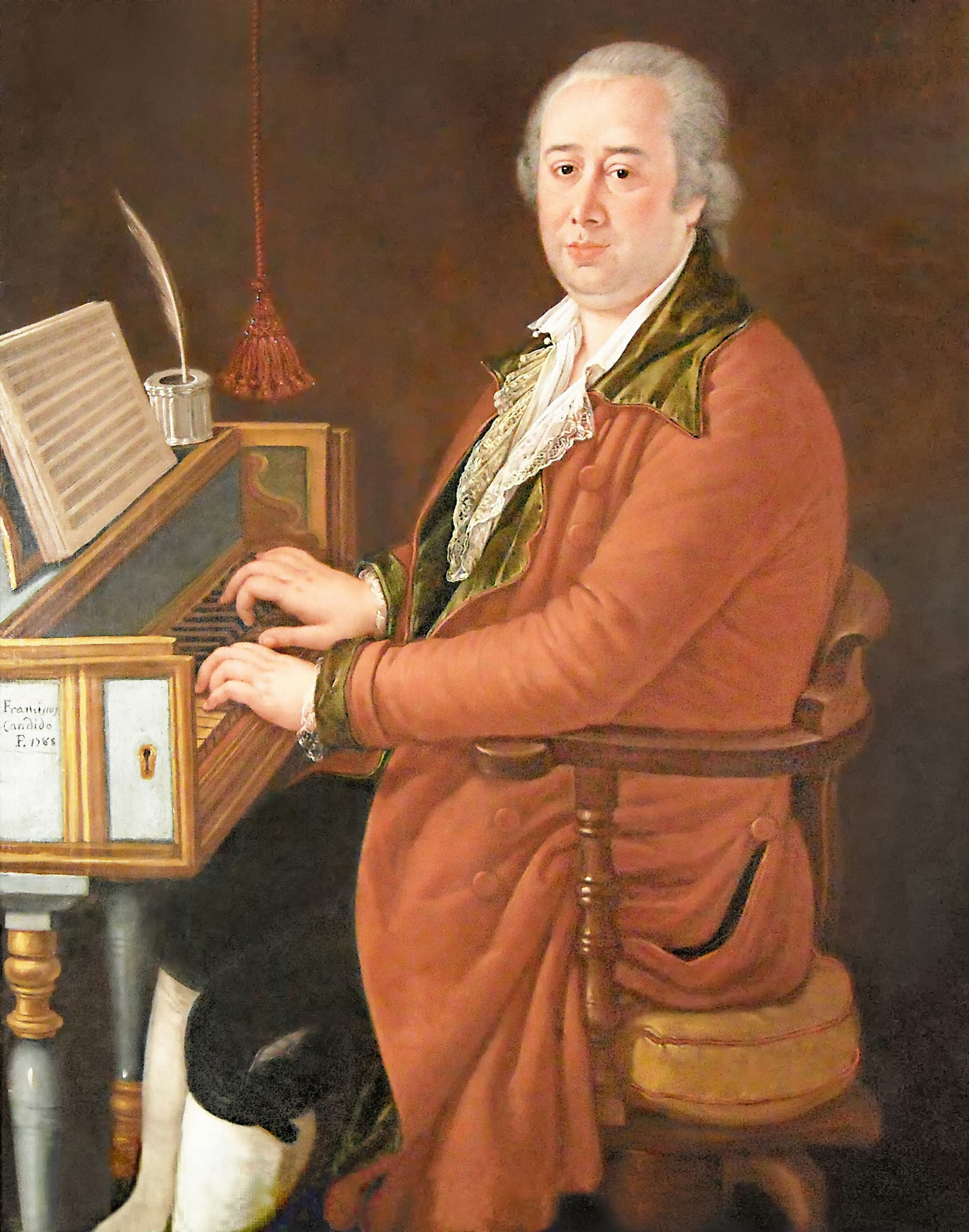
Domenico Cimarosa

In this era, the work of Giovanni Paisiello and Domenico Cimarosa stood out. Paisiello began in opera buffa (L'idolo cinese, 1767). In 1776 he was invited to Saint Petersburg, where he composed Lucinda ed Armidoro (1777), Nitteti (1777), and Il barbiere di Siviglia (1782), based on the play by Beaumarchais, which Rossini would later version. In 1784 he returned to Vienna, where he composed Il re Teodoro in Venezia and, shortly after, was appointed maestro di cappella to King Ferdinand IV of Naples, for whom he composed his greatest success Nina, o sia La pazza per amore (1789). He composed about eighty operas, in serious and buffo genres, although the latter more dramatic than usual, thus helping to prestige it.

Cimarosa was a prolific composer who by age thirty-five had composed fifteen operas, when in 1787 he was appointed maestro di cappella in Saint Petersburg, where he premiered La vergine del sole (1788) and Cleopatra (1789). In 1791 he was appointed maestro di cappella in Vienna, where the following year he achieved his greatest success with Il matrimonio segreto. His final production was about sixty operas, in which he showed great vital intensity and melodic warmth.

Nicola Antonio Zingarelli was the last great representative of the Neapolitan School. His first success was Montezuma (1781), premiered at the Teatro San Carlo and later performed by Haydn in Eszterháza. He produced opera buffas (Il mercato di Monfregoso, 1792; La secchia rapita, 1793) and serias (Artaserse, 1793; Giulietta e Romeo, 1796; Edipo a Colono, 1802).

Other exponents were: Gaetano Andreozzi (Giulio Cesare, 1789; La principessa filosofa, 1794), Francesco Bianchi (Il Gran Cid, 1773; La vilanella rapita, 1783; La vendetta di Nino, 1790; Ines de Castro, 1794), Valentino Fioravanti (Le cantatrici villane, 1798), Giuseppe Mosca (I tre mariti, 1811), Silvestro Palma (La pietra simpatica, 1795) and Angelo Tarchi (Le disgrazie fortunate, 1781; Il guerriero immaginario, 1783).

== Members ==
- Girolamo Abos (1715-1760)
- Cataldo Amodei (1649-1693)
- Gaetano Andreozzi (1755-1826)
- Pasquale Anfossi (1727-1797)
- Francesco Araja (1709-1770 circa)
- Gennaro Astarita (1749-1805)
- Pietro Auletta (1698 circa-1771)
- Michele Caballone (1692-1740)
- Pasquale Cafaro (1715-1783)
- Luigi Caruso (1754-1823)
- Domenico Cimarosa (1749-1801)
- Carlo Coccia (1782-1873)
- Nicola Conforto (1718-1793)
- Antonio Corbisiero (1720-1790)
- Francesco Corbisieri (1733 circa-1802)
- Giacomo Cordella (1786-1847)
- Giuseppe Curcio (1752-1832)
- Egidio Romualdo Duni (1708-1775)
- Francesco Durante (1684-1755)
- Lorenzo Fago (1704-1793)
- Nicola Fago (1677-1745)
- Pasquale Fago (1740-1794)
- Fedele Fenaroli (1730-1818)
- Francesco Feo (1691-1761)
- Nicola Fiorenza (?-1764)
- Ignazio Fiorillo (1715-1787)
- Domenico Fischietti (1725-1810)
- Gaspare Gabellone (1727-1796)
- Giuseppe Giordani (1751-1798)
- Tommaso Giordani (1730 circa-1806)
- Pietro Alessandro Guglielmi (1728-1804)
- Gaetano Greco (1657circa-1728)
- Giacomo Insanguine (1728-1793)
- Niccolò Jommelli (1714-1774)
- Gaetano Latilla (1711-1788)
- Vincenzo Lavigna (1776-1836)
- Leonardo Leo (1694-1744)
- Nicola Bonifacio Logroscino (1698-1765 circa)
- Nicola Manfroce (1791-1813)
- Gennaro Manna (1715-1779)
- Gian Francesco de Majo (1732-1770
- Giuseppe de Majo (1697-1771)
- Francesco Mancini (1672-1737)
- Gaetano Manna (1751-1804)
- Pietro Marchitelli (1643-1729)
- Gaetano Marinelli (1754-1820 circa)
- Giuseppe Mosca (1772-1839)
- Luigi Mosca (1775-1824)
- Giovanni Paisiello (1740-1816)
- Antonio Palella (1692-1761)
- Silvestro Palma (1754-1834)
- Pietro Domenico Paradies (1707-1791)
- Niccolò Piccinni (1728-1800)
- Giovanni Battista Pergolesi (1710-1736)
- Andrea Perrucci (1651-1704)
- Nicola Porpora (1686-1768)
- Giuseppe Porsile (1680-1750)
- Francesco Provenzale (1624-1704)
- Angelo Ragazzi (1680-1750)
- Donato Ricchezza (1648-1716)
- Antonio Sacchini (1730-1786)
- Nicola Sala (1713-1801)
- Giovanni Salvatore (1611-1688)
- Angelo Tarchi (1760 circa-1814)
- Giacomo Sarcuni (1690-1758)
- Domenico Sarro (1679-1744)
- Alessandro Scarlatti (1660-1725)
- Giuseppe Scarlatti (1718 or 1723-1777)
- Gregorio Sciroli (1722-1781)
- Giuseppe Sellitto (1700-1777)
- Alessandro Speranza (1724-1797)
- Tommaso Traetta (1727-1779)
- Giacomo Tritto (1733-1824)
- Gennaro Ursino (1650-?)
- Vincenzo Lavigna (1776-1836)
- Gaetano Veneziano (1665-1716)
- Giovanni Veneziano (1683-1742)
- Mattia Vento (1735-1776)
- Leonardo Vinci (1690-1730)
- Nicola Antonio Zingarelli (1752-1837)

== See also ==
- Neapolitan chord
- Neapolitan scale
- Monophony
- Polyphony
- History of opera
- Italian opera

== Bibliography ==
- Alier, Roger (2007). Diccionario de la ópera (in Spanish). Barcelona: Robinbook.
- Alier, Roger (2011). Historia de la ópera (in Spanish). Barcelona: Robinbook.
- Azcárate Ristori, José María de; Pérez Sánchez, Alfonso Emilio; Ramírez Domínguez, Juan Antonio (1983). Historia del Arte (in Spanish). Madrid: Anaya. ISBN 84-207-1408-9.
- Atlas ilustrado de la ópera (2011). Atlas ilustrado de la ópera (in Spanish). Madrid: Susaeta. ISBN 978-84-677-1630-6.
- Comellas, José Luis (2010). Historia sencilla de la Música (in Spanish). Madrid: Rialp. ISBN 978-84-321-3694-8.
- Diccionario de Música (2003). Diccionario de Música (in Spanish). Barcelona: RBA Larousse. ISBN 84-8332-394-X.
