= Antonio Nola =

Italian composer

Antonio Nola (1642-after 1715) was a Neapolitan composer of whom little biographical information or music survives. He is to be distinguished from the better known Giovanni Domenico da Nola born 130 years earlier (died 1592).

Antonio Nola was a minor figure among the Neapolitan composers who collaborated with musicians from the church of the Girolamini, which included Giovanni Maria Trabaci, Scipione Dentice (nephew of Fabrizio Dentice), Giovanni Maria Sabino, Giovanni Salvatore, master of the royal chapel Filippo Coppola and, foremost among them, Erasmo di Bartolo ("Padre Raimo") author of the monumental Mottetti per le quarant' ore. His only recorded work, in comparison with the Magnificat a 5 composed in the same year by his colleague Francesco Provenzale (1624–1704), shows a less sophisticated compositional level.

== Recording ==
- Magnificat a 5 voci con violini (1669) 13'25" on Magnificat anima mea. Il Culto Mariano e l'Oratorio Filippino nella Napoli del'600 Cappella della Pietà de' Turchini dir. Antonio Florio Symphonia 95138 1996.

== Sources ==
- Fabris, Dinko (2007). Music in Seventeenth-Century Naples: Francesco Provenzale (1624–1704). Abingdon-on-Thames: Routledge. ISBN 978-0-7546-3721-9.
