= Gloria Banditelli =

Italian mezzo-soprano

Gloria Banditelli (Assisi, 16 February 1954) is an Italian mezzo-soprano. She debuted in La Cenerentola in Spoleto in 1979. She is well known both for late-classical early-bel canto era roles of Rossini, Cimarosa and Paisiello, and also baroque opera, such as Monteverdi and Cavalli.

== Selected discography ==
- Giovanni Bononcini, Alessandro Scarlatti – Cantate da camera (Ensemble Aurora, Enrico Gatti – Tactus, 1988)
- Gioachino Rossini – Il barbiere di Siviglia (Nucci, Bartoli, Matteuzzi – Orchestra del Teatro Comunale di Bologna, Giuseppe Patanè – Decca, 1989)
- Christoph Willibald Gluck – Le cinesi (Isabelle Poulenard, Anne Sofie von Otter – Renée Jacobs – Deutsche Harmonia Mundi, 1990)
- Gioachino Rossini – La Cenerentola (Bartoli, Pertusi, Matteuzzi – Orchestra del Teatro Comunale di Bologna, Riccardo Chailly – Decca, 1993)
- Alessandro Scarlatti – Maddalena (Rossana Bertini, Silvia Piccolo – Europa Galante, Fabio Biondi – Opus 111, 1993)
- Girolamo Frescobaldi – Arie musicali (Concerto italiano, Rinaldo Alessandrini – Opus 111, 1994)
- Domenico Cimarosa – Il matrimonio segreto (Arts, 1995)
- Jacopo Peri – Euridice (Mario Cecchetti, Sergio Foresti, Rossana Bertini – Ensemble Arpeggia, Roberto de Caro – Arts, 1995)
- Georg Friedrich Händel – Arie e duetti d'amore (Sandrine Piau – Europa Galante, Fabio Biondi – Virgin, 1996)
- Georg Friedrich Händel – Poro (Rossana Bertini, Gerard Lesne, Bernarda Fink – Europa Galante, Fabio Biondi – Virgin, 1996)
- Claudio Monteverdi – L'Orfeo (Maria Kristina Kiehr, Roberta Invernizzi, Adriana Fernandez, Furio Zanasi – Ensemble Elyma, Gabriel Garrido – K 617, 1996)
- Claudio Monteverdi – Zefiro torna, duetti (Roberta Invernizzi, Elena Cecchi Fedi – Complesso Barocco, Alan Curtis – Virgin, 1996)
- Giovanni Paisiello – Nina, o sia La pazza per amore (Arts, 1996)
- Giovanni Paisiello – La molinara (Scarabelli, Matteuzzi, Remigio – Orchestra del Teatro Comunale di Bologna, Ivor Bolton – Ricordi, 1997)
- Francesco Provenzale – La colomba ferita (Cappella della Pietà dei Turchini, Antonio Florio – Opus 111, 1997)
- Johann Sebastian Bach – Mass in B Minor, Diego Fasolis 1998
- Claudio Monteverdi – Il ritorno d'Ulisse in patria (Furio Zanasi, Maria Cristina Kiehr, Jean-Paul Fouchécourt, Adriana Fernandez – Ensemble Elyma, Gabriel Garrido – K 617, 1998)
- Georg Friedrich Händel – Rodrigo (Sandrine Piau, Elena Cecchi Fedi, Roberta Invernizzi, Caterina Calvi – Complesso Barocco, Alan Curtis – Virgin Veritas, 1999)
- Benedetto Marcello – Arianna (Anna Chierichetti, Mirko Guadagnini, Sergio Foresti, Antonio Abete – Athestis Chorus, Filippo Maria Bressan – Chandos, 2000)
- Claudio Monteverdi – L'incoronazione di Poppea (Guillemette Laurens, Adriana Fernandez, Flavio Oliver, Alice Borges, Martin Oro, Elena Cecchi Fedi, Furio Zanasi, Philippe Jaroussky – Ensemble Elyma, Gabriel Garrido – K 617, 2000)
- Antonio Vivaldi – La Silvia RV 734 (Roberta Invernizzi, John Elwes, Philippe Cantor – Ensemble Baroque de Nice, Gilbert Bezzina – Ligia Digital, 2000)
- Francesco Cavalli – Arie e duetti (Gianluca Belfiori Doro, Sergio Vartolo – Naxos, 2000)
- Giovanni Battista Pergolesi – Cantate da camera (Ensemble barocco in canto, Fabio Maestri – Bis, 2001)
- Giuseppe Sarti – Armida e Rinaldo (Bongiovanni, 2003)
- Alessandro Scarlatti – Humanità e Lucifero (Cristiana Miatello, Silvia Piccolo – Europa Galante, Fabio Biondi – Naive, 2003)
- Antonio Vivaldi – Farnace RV 711-D (Furio Zanasi, Sara Mingardo, Sonia Prina – Les Concert des Nations, Jordi Savall – Alia Vox, 2003)
- Giacomo Antonio Perti – Musica sacra (Yetsabel Fernandez Arias – Arion Consort & Choir, Giulio Prandi – Amadeus, 2010)
- Giuseppe Verdi – I vespri siciliani (Capuano, Cheryl Studer, Chris Merritt, Coro del Teatro alla Scala di Milano, Ernesto Gavazzi, Ferrero Poggi, Ferruccio Furlanetto, Francesco Musinu, Giorgio Zancanaro, Gloria Banditelli, Mario Chingari, Orchestra del Teatro alla Scala di Milano, Paulo Barbacini & Riccardo Muti), 1990 EMI
