= Music conservatories of Naples =

Italian music schools

Coordinates: 40°50′58″N 14°15′09″E

This is a list of music conservatories in Naples, Italy.

== Conservatorio di San Pietro a Majella ==
The Naples Conservatory of Music is a music school located in Naples, Italy. It is situated in the complex of San Pietro a Majella.

It was originally located in the church of the former monastery of San Sebastiano and was called the Conservatorio di San Sebastiano, formed in 1807 by the merger of the Conservatorio di Santa Maria di Loreto, the Conservatorio di Sant' Onofrio in Capuana, and the Conservatorio della Pietà dei Turchini. It also became known as the Real Collegio di Musica, and after 1826 when it moved to its current location, as the Conservatorio di Musica San Pietro a Majella.

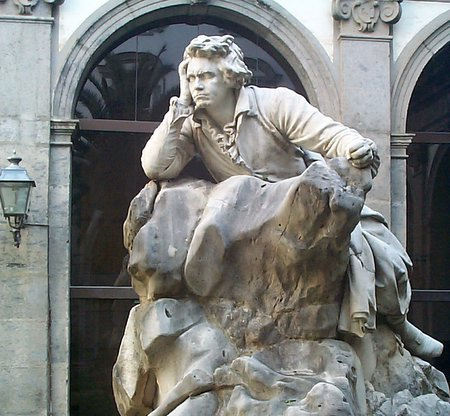
Beethoven Statue (1895) by Jerace in the cloister of Conservatory.

The conservatory and adjacent church are today part of the old San Pietro a Majella monastic complex, built at the end of the 13th century and dedicated to the monk Pietro da Morone, who became Pope Celestine V in 1294. The conservatory houses an impressive library of manuscripts pertaining to the lives and musical production of composers who lived and worked in Naples, among whom are Alessandro Scarlatti, Pergolesi, Vincenzo Battista, Domenico Cimarosa, Rossini, Bellini, and Donizetti. Vittorio Monti, who around 1904 composed the famous Csárdás, studied violin and composition at this conservatory. Another student was Leonardo De Lorenzo, flautist of many American orchestras and teacher at the Eastman School of Music. The historical museum has a display of rare antique musical instruments.

== The historic conservatories ==
San Pietro a Majella is the last in a long string of establishments that have been music conservatories in Naples. Their existence goes back to the Spanish rule of the city as a vicerealm starting in the early 16th century. These early conservatories were Santa Maria di Loreto, Pietà dei Turchini, Sant'Onofrio a Capuana, and I Poveri di Gesù Cristo. They enjoyed a considerable reputation as training grounds not only for young children to be trained in church music, but, eventually, as a feeder system into the world of commercial music once that opened up in the early 17th century.

=== Conservatorio di Santa Maria di Loreto ===
Santa Maria di Loreto was built in 1535 and was the original conservatory in Naples, coming at the beginning of the Spanish expansion of Naples under the city's most famous viceroy, don Pedro de Toledo. It is the first secular music conservatory. Alumni include Salvatore Lanzetti and Domenico Cimarosa. Old maps show Santa Maria di Loreto to have been a seafront "borgo" —a separate section of town. Thus, the conservatory was beyond the Spanish fortifications that guarded the southeastern approach to Naples.

=== Conservatorio di Sant'Onofrio a Capuana ===
Sant'Onofrio a Capuana dates from 1578 and counts as its alumni Niccoló Jommelli, Giovanni Paisiello, Niccolò Piccinni, and Antonio Sacchini, four of the great names in the 18th century Neapolitan music. The Italian Baroque composer Cristofaro Caresana was a director from 1667 until 1690. The original building still stands, just across the street on the north side of the old Vicaria, the tribunale, the Naples Hall of Justice.

=== Conservatorio della Pietà dei Turchini ===
The building of the Conservatorio della Pietà dei Turchini, built in 1583, still stands on via Medina, near the city hall. The Church of Pietà dei Turchini, still consecrated, has a plaque explaining the role of the conservatory among the four major ones. The name "conservatory" originally indicated a place that "conserved" orphans and young women. All of the institutions instructed their wards in music; thus was born the modern meaning of "music school". By the 19th century, however, most of the pupils of the conservatory were not orphans.

Evidence of the productivity of this conservatory is that among its pupils were: Giovanni Salvatore, Francesco Provenzale, Gaetano Greco, Nicola Fago, Carmine Giordani, Michele de Falco, Leonardo Leo, Giuseppe de Majo, Lorenzo Fago (Son of Nicola Fago) (1704–1793), Nicola Sala, Niccolo Jommelli, Girolamo Abos, Pasquale Cafaro, Pasquale Errichelli, Giacomo Tritto, Ferdinando Orlandi, Gaspare Spontini, Giuseppe Farinelli, Luigi Lablache, and Nicola Antonio Manfroce.

Teachers of this Conservatory, some of whom had been pupils listed above, included: Giovanni Maria Sabino, Erasmo di Bartolo, Giovanni Salvatore, Francesco Provenzale (1624–1704), Cristoforo Caresana, Gennaro Ursino, Nicola Fago (1677–1745), Giacomo Sarcuni (1690–1759), Lorenzo Fago (1704–1793), Nicola Sala (1713–1801), Girolamo Abos (1715–1760), Pasquale Cafaro (1716–1787), and Giacomo Tritto (1733–1824).

=== Conservatorio dei Poveri di Gesù Cristo ===
The Conservatorio dei Poveri di Gesù Cristo was founded in 1589 by Marcello Fossataro, a Franciscan friar. It was adjacent to the church of Santa Maria a Colonna on via dei Tribunale. Illustrious names connected with the school include the philosopher Giovan Battista Vico, a "maestro de [sic] grammatica" from 1620 to 1627. Musical luminaries at the conservatory included Francesco Durante, Gaetano Greco, Nicola Porpora, Leonardo Vinci and Giovanni Battista Pergolesi. This conservatory was suppressed in November 1743 and converted into an establishment of the archepiscopal seminary.

=== Conservatorio di San Sebastiano ===
In 1806, with Napoleon Bonaparte's brother, Joseph, installed as the king of Naples in what would be a decade of French rule of the kingdom, monastic life in the kingdom was drastically reorganized and the three surviving monastery music schools were consolidated into a single building, the Church of San Sebastiano, not far from the modern conservatory. Finally, in 1826 that consolidated conservatory was moved to the present site.

== Other voices ==
- Neapolitan School
