= Gaetano Greco =

Italian Baroque composer

Gaetano Greco (c. 1657 – c. 1728) was an Italian Baroque composer. He was the younger brother of Rocco Greco (c. 1650 – before 1718). Both brothers were trained at and later taught at the Poveri di Gesu` Cristo conservatory in Naples. Gaetano Greco's teachers included Giovanni Salvatore and Gennaro Ursino, and possibly Francesco Provenzale. It is also possible that he studied with Alessandro Scarlatti. Leonardo Vinci, Giuseppe Porsile, Nicola Porpora, and Domenico Scarlatti (perhaps also Giovanni Battista Pergolesi) were among his pupils. His successor at the conservatory was Francesco Durante.

== Works, editions and recordings ==
- Tuoni ecclesiastici con li loro versetti
