= Giuseppe Cavallo =

Italian composer and priest

Giuseppe Cavallo (Moncalieri 1621 - died 1684 in Naples) was an Italian composer and priest. He was maestro di canto at the conservatory and assistant to his teacher Francesco Provenzale. His oratorio Il Giuditio universale was recorded by Antonio Florio.
