= Juditha triumphans =

Oratorio by Antonio Vivaldi

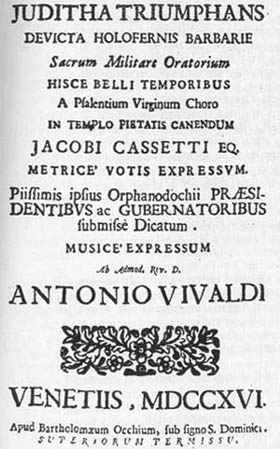
First edition of Juditha triumphans

Juditha triumphans devicta Holofernis barbarie (Latin: 'Judith triumphant after defeating the barbarity of Holofernes'), RV 644, is an oratorio by Antonio Vivaldi. Although the rest of the oratorio survives completely intact, the overture has been lost. The Latin libretto was written by Iacopo Cassetti based upon the Book of Judith.

The exact date of composition and performance of Juditha triumphans are not known, but the allegorical treatment of the Venetian defense of Corfu dominated public discussion in Venice throughout 1716. This work was an allegorical description of the victory of the Venetians (the Christians) over the Turks in August 1716. The work was commissioned to celebrate the victory of the Republic of Venice over the Turks during the siege of Corfu: in July 1716, the Turks had landed on Corfu and set siege to the island. The population resisted the occupation and, in August, Venice signed an alliance with the Holy Roman Emperor. On 18 August, under the leadership of Count Johann Matthias von der Schulenburg, the decisive battle was won and the Turks abandoned the island.

Although it has been suggested that Juditha triumphans was performed at the Ospedale della Pietà in November 1716, the victorious General Schulenburg, to whom the work is dedicated, could not have been present for any performance prior to January 3, 1717.

== Score ==
All characters, male and female, were interpreted by women of the Ospedale della Pietà. They are:

- Juditha, contralto, a young Bethulian widow
- Holofernes, contralto, Assyrian general
- Vagaus, soprano, eunuch, Holofernes's squire
- Abra, soprano, Juditha's handmaid
- Ozias, contralto, high priest of Bethulia

An all-female choir sings the parts of the Assyrian soldiers and of the Bethulian women. In the tradition of the Ospedale della Pietà, where some of the singers were trained to sing below the normal contralto range, the chorus is scored for SATB.

The string orchestra is augmented by timpani, 2 trumpets, mandolino, 4 theorbos, 5 "viole all'inglese" (viols), 1 viola d'amore, 2 recorders, 2 chalumeaux (soprano), "Clarini" (trumpets), 2 oboes, organ.

== Plot ==
The Assyrian king Nebuchadnezzar sends an army against Israel to demand overdue tributes. Under the leadership of the general Holofernes, the Assyrians lay siege to the town of Bethulia and are about to conquer it. The young Jewish widow Judith goes to him to implore mercy. He falls in love with her and she indulges him. After a rich banquet and having drunk much wine, Holofernes falls asleep. Judith beheads him, flees the enemy camp, and returns victorious to Bethulia.

== Recordings ==
- 1941: Elena Nicolai (J), Antenore Reali (H), Gino del Signore (V), Rina Corsi (A), Antonio Cassinelli (O); Orchestra dell'Accademia Musicale Chigiana / Unione Corale Senese e Piccolo Coro dell'Accademia di Santa Cecilia di Roma - Vittorio Baglioni (maestro del coro); Antonio Guarnieri (conductor) — Fonitcetra.
- 1951: Maria Amadini (J), Marcello Cortis (H), Emilio Cristinelli (V), Rosanna Giancola (A), Giuliano Ferrein (O); Chorus of the Teatro La Fenice, Venice / Symphony Orchestra of the Scuola Veneziana - Angelo Ephrikian — The Opera Society.
- 1964: Zsuzsa Barlay (J), Zsolt Bende (H), Jószef Réti (V), Margit László (A), Jószef Dene (O); Budapest Madrigal Choir (György Czigány) / Hungarian State Orchestra - Ferenc Szekeres — Hungaroton.
- 1968: Oralia Dominguez (J), Irene Compañez (H), Bianca Maria Casoni (V), Emilia Cundari (A), Maria Grazia Allegri (O); Chorus of the Accademia Filarmonica Romana (Luigi Colacicchi) / Angelicum Chamber Orchestra - Alberto Zedda — Angelicum.
- 1974: Birgit Finnilä (J), Julia Hamari (H), Elly Ameling (V), Ingeborg Springer (A), Annelies Burmeister (O); Rundfunks-Solistenvereinigung Berlin (Dietrich Knothe) / Berlin Chamber Orchestra - Vittorio Negri — Philips Classics.
- 1976: Verena Piller (J), Philippe Huttenlocher (H), Pierre-André Blaser (V), Kathrin Graf (A); Ensemble Alauda de Genève (Jean-Louis Rebut) / Collegium Academicum de Genève - Robert Dunand — Concert Hall.
- 1990: Gloria Banditelli (J), Judit Németh (H), Annette Markert (V), Maria Zádori (A), Katalin Gémes (O); Savaria Vocal Ensemble (István Deáky) / Capella Savaria - Nicholas McGegan — Hungaroton.
- 1997: Ann Murray (J), Susan Bickley (H), María Cristina Kiehr (V), Sarah Connolly (A), Jean Rigby (O); The Choir of the King's Consort / The King's Consort - Robert King — Hyperion.
- 2000: Magdalena Kožená (J), Maria José Trullu (H), Marina Comparato (V), Anke Herrmann (A), Tiziana Carraro (O); Coro da Camera dell'Accademia Nazionale di Santa Cecilia (Martino Faggiani) / Montis Regalis Academy - Alessandro de Marchi — Opus 111 / Naive.
- 2000: Barbara di Castri (J), Lucia Sciannimanico (H), Nicki Kennedy (V), Alessandra Rossi (A), Rowena Anketell (O); Coro da Camera Italiano, Roma / Modo Antiquo - Federico Maria Sardelli — Amadeus.
- 2001: Delores Ziegler (J), Gloria Banditelli (H), Cecilia Gasdia (V), Manuela Custer (A), Laura Brioli (O); Coro Filarmonico Antonio Vivaldi (Giampaolo Grazioli)/I Solisti Veneti; Claudio Scimone — Warner Fonit.
- 2007: Sara Mingardo (J), Guillemette Laurens (H), Roberta Invernizzi (V), Manuela Custer (A), Tiziana Pizzi (O); Coro della Radio Svizzera / I Barocchisti - Diego Fasolis — RTSI Multimedia.
- 2007: Sally-Anne Russell (J), David Walker (H), Fiona Campbell (V), Sara Macliver (A), Renée Martin (O); Cantillation / Orchestra of the Antipodes - Attilio Cremonesi — ABC Classics.
- 2019: Marianne Beate Kielland (J), Marina de Liso (H), Rachel Redmond (V), Lucía Martín-Cartón (A), Kristin Mulders (O); La Capella Reial de Catalunya / Le Concert des Nations - Jordi Savall — Alia Vox.
