= Dinko Fabris =

Italian musicologist

Academic background
- Education: Conservatorio di Verona; University of Bologna; Royal Holloway, University of London

Academic work
- Discipline: Lute music and Italian music, especially that of Naples
- Institutions: University of Basilicata; Conservatory of Bari; International Musicological Society

Dinko Fabris is an Italian musicologist. He specializes in lute music, the music of Naples, and Italian music in general, having written books on Italian composers such as Andrea Falconieri, Andrea Gabrieli, Francesco Provenzale and Francesco Cavalli. He holds teaching posts at the Conservatory of Bari and the University of Basilicata, and was president of the International Musicological Society from 2012 to 2017.

== Life and career ==
Dinko Fabris attended the Conservatorio di Verona to study lute, followed by study at the University of Bologna for Italian literature and musicology. He received a PhD from the Royal Holloway, University of London. A visiting professor at the University of Paris, University of Melbourne, and University of Ljubljana, Fabris has received fellowships from the University of Melbourne and the Warburg Institute. He teaches at the Conservatory of Bari, and since 2001 at the University of Basilicata as well.

Fabris' speciality is on lute music and the music of Naples. He has also published books on a variety of Italian composers, including Andrea Falconieri, Andrea Gabrieli, Francesco Provenzale, and Francesco Cavalli. Other publications include a survey on the music of Ferrara and Henry Purcell, as well as over 120 articles and essays. His better known works include Music in Seventeenth-Century Naples (2007) and a 2016 book on Handel's Partenope.

Fabris has advised on numerous scholarly music editions, such as the Opere di Francesco Cavalli and the New Gesualdo Edition. He is a music consultant for the Pontifical Council for Culture and was president of the International Musicological Society from 2012 to 2017. Fabris has worked with Antonio Florio and his early music ensemble Cappella Neapolitana, to revive Neapolitan music, particularly Cristofaro Caresana, Provenzale, and Salvatore.

== Selected publications ==
=== Books ===
- Fabris, Dinko (2007). Music in Seventeenth-Century Naples: Francesco Provenzale (1624–1704). Abingdon-on-Thames: Routledge. ISBN 978-0-7546-3721-9.
- ——; Murata, Margaret (2015). Passaggio in Italia: Music on the Grand Tour in the Seventeenth Century. Turnhout: Brepols. ISBN 978-2-503-53568-5.

=== Articles ===
- Fabris, Dinko (1992). "Vita e opere di Fabrizio Dentice, nobile napoletano, compositore del secondo Cinquecento" [Life and works of Fabrizio Dentice, Neapolitan nobleman, composer of the second half of the sixteenth century]. Studi musicali (in Italian). 21: 61–113.
- —— (1993). "Il Ruolo di Napoli Nella Tradizione del Ricercare in Partitura: Una Sconosciuta Raccolta di Fabrizio Dentice Del 1567?" [The Role of Naples in the Tradition of Score Research: An Unknown Collection by Fabrizio Dentice from 1567?]. Revista de Musicología (in Italian). 16 (6): 3293–3308. doi:10.2307/20796935. JSTOR 20796935.
- —— (November 1995). "Festivals at Bari and Mantua". Early Music. 23 (1): 724–726. doi:10.1093/earlyj/XXIII.4.724. JSTOR 3137965.
- —— (November 1997). "25 years of early music in Italy". Early Music. 25 (4): 573–576. doi:10.1093/earlyj/XXV.4.573. JSTOR 3128404.
- —— (1998). "La musica sacra di Francesco Provenzale" [The sacred music of Francesco Provenzale]. Analecta Musicologica (in Italian). 30: 323–372.
- Veneziano, Giulia Anna Romana; Di Benedetto, Renato; Fabris, Dinko (2001). "Naples". Grove Music Online. Oxford: Oxford University Press. doi:10.1093/gmo/9781561592630.article.42068. ISBN 978-1-56159-263-0. (subscription, Wikilibrary access, or UK public library membership required)
- —— (February 2002). "François Lesure, 1923–2001". Early Music. 30 (1): 153. doi:10.1093/em/XXX.1.153. JSTOR 3519301.
- —— (May 2003). "Festival Lodoviciano, Viadana". Early Music. 31 (2): 314–315. doi:10.1093/earlyj/XXXI.2.314. JSTOR 3138092.
- —— (November 2006). "Cervantes at the Marco Fodella Foundation". Early Music. 34 (4): 717. doi:10.1093/em/cal071. JSTOR 4137333.
- —— (February 2007). "Musical iconography in Ravenna". Early Music. 35 (1): 163–164. doi:10.1093/em/cal116. JSTOR 4137297.
- —— (August 2009). "Music and Gesture in Caravaggio's Paintings: A Film". Early Music. 37 (3): 521–523. doi:10.1093/em/cap070. JSTOR 40390811.
- —— (February 2010). "Early music in Italy in 2009". Early Music. 38 (1): 165–166. doi:10.1093/em/cap125. JSTOR 40731333.
- —— (February 2013). "Reviving early opera: the past as progress". Early Music. 41 (1): 33–34. doi:10.1093/em/cat012. JSTOR 43306792.
- —— (August 2018). "Seicento intersections of Spanish comedy and Italian theatre". Early Music. 46 (3): 525–526. doi:10.1093/em/cay061. JSTOR 26546593.
- Fabris, Dinko (2019). "Alessandro Scarlatti". Oxford Bibliographies: Music. Oxford: Oxford University Press. doi:10.1093/OBO/9780199757824-0266. ISBN 978-0-19-975782-4. (subscription required)
- —— (August 2020). "The Italian chamber cantata: a decade of recordings". Early Music. 48 (3): 408–411. doi:10.1093/em/caaa053.
- —— (November 2024). "French music library collections". Early Music. caae044. doi:10.1093/em/caae044.
