= Li zite 'ngalera =

1722 Italian musical comedy

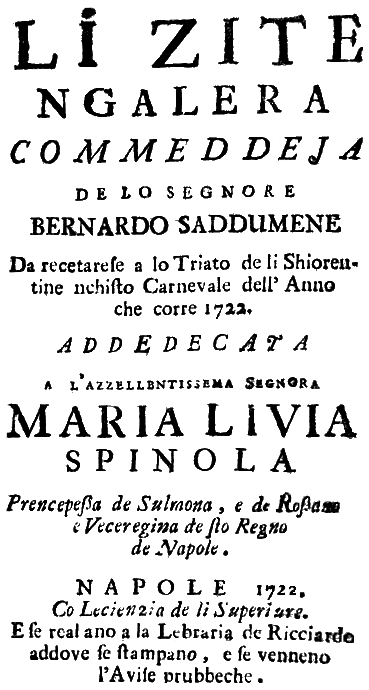
Title page of the libretto, 1722

Li zite 'ngalera (The Newlyweds on the Galley) is a commedia per musica in three acts by the Italian composer Leonardo Vinci, first performed at the Teatro dei Fiorentini, Naples, on 3 January 1722. The libretto, by Bernardo Saddumene, is written in the Neapolitan language which characterizes it as commeddeja pe mmuseca.

== Roles ==
Roles, voice types, premiere cast
Role	Voice type	Premiere cast: 3 January 1722
Ciomma	soprano	Rosa Cirillo
Federico Mariani	bass	
Belluccia	soprano	Ippolita Costa
Ciccariello	soprano (en travesti)	
Carlo	soprano (en travesti)	Giacomina Ferrari
Titta	contralto	Filippo Calantro (Calandra)
Rapisto	bass	Giovanni Romaniello
Meneca	tenor (en travesti)	Simone de Falco
Colagnolo	tenor	
Assan	bass	
Schiava (slave girl)	soprano	Laura Monti

== Synopsis ==
The young man Carlo abandons his old love Belluccia in favour of a new one, Ciomma. Disguised as a man, Belluccia pursues Carlo. She manages to make several local ladies, including Ciomma herself, fall in love with her. When Belluccia's father, the galley captain Federico, arrives, he threatens Carlo with death, but Belluccia takes pity on him and the couple are reconciled and married. At the end of the opera we see the newlyweds sail back to their old hometown on Federico's galley (hence the title).

== Recordings ==
- Li zite 'ngalera, Cappella della Pietà de' Turchini, conducted by Antonio Florio (Opus 111, 1999) 2CDs
