= Unibas =

Unibas may refer to:

- The University of Basel (German: Universität Basel), Switzerland
- The University of Basilicata (Italian: Università degli Studi della Basilicata), Italy
