= Nicola Sabatino =

Italian composer

Nicola Sabatino (also: Sabbatini and Sabatini; 1705–1796) was a Neapolitan composer.

Sabatino was born in Naples and became one of the late baroque Neapolitan composers centred on the Music conservatories of Naples and the opera at the Teatro di San Carlo typified by Porpora, Leonardo Leo, Francesco Durante. In November 1774 Sabatino directed his own music for the funeral of Niccolò Jommelli.

== Works ==
Operas

- Cleante (1752, Rome)
- Arsace (30 May 1754, Naples)
- Endimione (1758, Dublin)

Masses

- Mass 1726
- Mass 1728

Oratorios

- Jaele Venice 1743

Cantatas

- Cantata Laetamini fideles alto, 2vn., bc.
- Vola turtur de nido.

Instrumental

- Solo per violoncello, 2 violins and B.c.
