= Salvatore Lanzetti =

Italian cellist and composer (c. 1710 – c. 1780)

- Born: c. 1720
- Died: c. 1780 (aged 60)
- Education: Conservatorio Santa Maria di Loreto
- Occupations: Cellist; composer
- Years active: 1720s–1780
- Era: Baroque; classical period
- Style: Classical

Salvatore Lanzetti (c. 1710 – c. 1780) was an Italian cellist and composer of the late Baroque and early Classical era.

== Life and career ==
Salvatore Lanzetti was a student at the Conservatorio Santa Maria di Loreto in Naples. He was first employed in Lucca, where he worked with Francesco Maria Veracini. In 1727, he entered the service of Victor Amadeus II of Sardinia at the court of Turin, where he again worked, from 1760 until his death. From 1739 to 1754, Lanzetti worked in Paris and London. He gave concerts in Sicily, Paris (at the Concert Spirituel in May 1736) and Germany.

Lanzetti was a virtuoso cellist who contributed to several developments in cello technique, including difficult uses of the bow, double stops, complex fingering, and using the thumb as a capotasto.

== Works ==
- 12 Cello sonatas, Op. 1 (1750, Paris)
- 6 Cello sonatas, Op. 2 (1754, London)
- 6 Cello sonatas, Op. 5 (undated, Paris)
- Other Sonatas in manuscript
