= Niccolò Grillo =

Italian composer

Niccolò Grillo (fl. 1720s) was an Italian composer. He was a teacher at the Conservatory of San Onofrio, Naples until 1723.

== Works ==
- Niccolò Grillo: Sosutose no juorno. Neapolitan cantata for tenor, strings and basso continuo.
