= Fabrizio Dentice =

Italian composer

Fabrizio Dentice (also Fabricio, Fabritio) (1539 in Naples – 24 February 1581 in Naples) was an Italian composer and virtuoso lute and viol player.

== Biography ==
Fabrizio was born into the noble Dentice family. He was the son of Luigi Dentice (1510–1566) who served the powerful Sanseverino family and had a great reputation as a singer and lutenist. Fabrizio was also uncle to the harpsichordist Scipione Dentice (1560–1633).

== Musical editions ==
- Dinko Fabris. Da Napoli a Parma: itinerari d'un musicista aristocratico. Opera vocali di Fabrizio Dentice, 15630ca-1580. Rome and Milan: Accademia Nazionale di Santa Cecilia, 1998.
- Dinko Fabris and John Griffiths (eds). Neapolitan Lute Music: Fabrizio Dentice, Giulio Severino, Giovanni Antonio Severino, Francesco Cardone. Recent Researches in Music of the Renaissance 140. Madison: A-R Editions, 2004. (includes all Dentice's known lute music including doubtful ascriptions)

== Selected discography ==
Vocal works:

- De Lamentatione Hieremiae on Italia Mia, Musical Imagination of the Renaissance. Huelgas Ensemble, Paul Van Nevel, Philippe Verdelot, et al. Sony 1992.
- Miserere. on Emilio de Cavalieri Lamentations. Le Poème Harmonique dir. Vincent Dumestre, Alpha 2002
- Versetti del Miserere, in falsibordoni del Dentice passeggiati da Donatello Coya eunuco della Real Capella (1622) [6'54"] on Magnificat anima mea. Il Culto Mariano e l'Oratorio Filippino nella Napoli del'600. Cappella della Pietà de' Turchini Symphonia 1996

Instrumental:

- 2 lute pieces, (with songs by father Luigi Dentice - Come t'haggio lassata, o via mia? Chi me l'havesse dett', o via mia?) on Napolitane - villanelle, arie & moresche (1530-70). Ensemble Micrologus, Cappella della Pietà de' Turchini dir. Florio, Opus111 1999
- The Siena Lute Book Jacob Heringman Avie-AV0036 2004
