= Gennaro Negri =

Italian composer

Gennaro Negri (fl. 1810s) was an early 19th-century Italian song composer. His La Rosella with guitar accompaniment was recorded by Antonio Florio.
