= Giuseppe Petrini =

Italian composer

Giuseppe Petrini was an Italian composer. His Graziello e Nella, a comic intermezzo for two voices and string orchestra, was recorded by Antonio Florio.
