= Nicola Fiorenza =

Italian composer

Nicola (or Nicolò) Fiorenza (c. 1700-1710 – 13 April 1764) was a Neapolitan violinist and composer of the late Baroque period and a representative of the Neapolitan School.

== Life ==
Biographical information on Fiorenza's schooling and early life is very scarce; he must have been born in the city of Naples somewhere in the very beginning of the 18th century. Nevertheless, we can be sure that he received his training at the conservatory of S. Maria del Loreto in his hometown under Giancarlo Cailò and Francesco Barbella. The first verifiable date in Fiorenza's career is 1726, the year in which his sinfonia in A minor for flute, two violins and basso continuo was published. From 1734 to 1740, Fiorenza played, maybe as a violinist, in the Cappella Reale and with the orchestra of the Teatro S. Bartolomeo.

More information is available about Fiorenza's later years. An account of his election to the post of teacher for violin, cello and double bass at the Naples conservatory of S. Maria del Loreto on 22 May 1743 indicates that he succeeded Nicola Vitolo (who in his turn was the successor of Fiorenza's former teacher Barbella). From 1750 onwards, however, Fiorenza was confronted with a series of troubles at the conservatory. Not only did he engage in a violent conflict with one of his colleagues, the oboist Cherubino Corena, he also seems to have had several altercations with his students. As a result of this, Fiorenza was dismissed from his post in 1763.

Alongside his teaching activities at the conservatory of S. Maria del Loreto, Fiorenza seems to have remained active as a violinist in the Cappella Reale, in 1754 taking over the leader's position from Domenico de Matteis, who had died in that same year. On Fiorenza's activities between his dismissal in 1763 and his death on 13 April 1764, we lack all information.

== Works ==
According to the musicologist Andrea Friggi, apart from the 1726 sinfonia, most if not all of Fiorenza's approximately thirty works can be dated in the period from 1727 to 1738. However, it is probable that during the period he taught at the conservatory of S. Maria del Loreto he wrote more works. His surviving works, mostly instrumental, consist of approximately fifteen concertos for different combinations of instruments, several (trio) sonatas and nine sinfonie, some of which are enlivened by virtuoso solos or wind instruments, which make them comparable to the concerto form. Apart from these instrumental works, two cantatas for alto and basso continuo have been preserved. Stylistically, Fiorenza's works range from the strict pattern of Corelli's church sonatas to the galant work of Francesco Durante.

=== Concerti ===
| Key | Instruments | Movements |
|---|---|---|
| A major | 3 violins, continuo | Largo; Allegro; Largo; Allegro assai |
| A minor | flute, 2 violins, continuo | Grave; Allegro; Grave; Allegro assai |
| A minor | flute, 2 violins, continuo | Moderato; Fuga; Largo; Allegro |
| A minor | 3 violins, continuo | Andante lento; Allegro; Largo; Allegro |
| A minor | cello, violins and continuo | Largo; Allegro; Adagio; Allegro |
| A minor | violins and continuo | Andante largo; Allegro; Largo; Presto |
| B flat major (1728) | cello and strings | Largo; Allegro; Largo; Allegro |
| C minor | flute, 3 violins, viola, continuo | Largo; Allegro ma non presto; Largo; Allegro |
| D major (1728) | 2 violins, violoncello obbligato, continuo | Largo; Allegro; Largo; Allegro |
| D major | 2 violins, viola, violoncello obbligato, continuo | Largo; Allegro; Andante largo; Allegro ma non presto |
| F major | 2 violins, violoncello obbligato, continuo | Presto; Allegro; Largo; Allegro |
| F minor | flute, 2 violins, cello, continuo | Largo-Presto; Allegro ma non presto; Largo; Allegro |
| F minor | flute, 3 violins, viola, continuo | Largo amoroso; Andante; Largo; Allegro |
| G minor | flute, 3 violins, continuo | Grave; Allegro; Grave; Allegro |

=== Sinfonie ===
| Key | Instruments | Movements |
|---|---|---|
| A major, a violino principale | violin, strings, continuo | |
| A minor | 4 violins, continuo | |
| A minor (1726) | flute, 2 violins, continuo | Grave; Allegro; Grave; Allegro |
| A minor | 2 violins, strings, continuo | |
| F major | cello, 2 violins, continuo | |
| F minor | flute, 2 violins, continuo | |
| F minor | 2 violins, continuo | |
| F minor, sinfonia fugata | 3 violins, continuo | |
| G major | 3 violins, continuo | |

=== Sonatas ===
| Key | Instruments | Movements |
|---|---|---|
| A minor | flute, continuo | |
| B minor | 2 violins, continuo | |
| D minor | 2 violins, continuo | |
| G minor | violin, continuo | Largo; Allegro; Largo; Fuga |

== Bibliography ==
- Aresi, Stefano (2015). "Concerti napoletani per violoncello", in accompanying booklet, Nel Giardino di Partenope, performed by Gaetano Nasillo & Ensemble 415 directed by Chiara Banchini, Arcana A385, compact disc.
- Friggi, Andrea (2008). "Music and Music Teaching in Naples at the Beginning of the 18th Century: Nicola Fiorenza and his instrumental works", in accompanying booklet, Nicola Fiorenza: Concerti & Sonate, performed by Dolce & Tempesta directed by Stefano Demicheli, FUG 549, compact disc.
