= Nicola Ugolino =

Italian composer and lute player

Nicola Ugolino (fl. 1720s) was an Italian lute player and composer. He was a musician in the Real Cappella, and recorded as a "street musician in the cemetery" (Italian: 'suonatore nel Cimitero)."
