= Giuseppe Avitrano =

Italian composer and violinist

- Born: 1670; Naples
- Died: March 1756 (aged 85–86)
- Occupation: Musician

Giuseppe Antonio Avitrano (Naples, c. 1670 – Naples, 19 March 1756) was an Italian composer and violinist.

Avitrano came from a family of musicians. From about 1690 until his death, he was member of the Neapolitan court orchestra.

== Works ==
- 10 Sonatas for 2 violins, violone, organ, Op. 1 (Naples, 1697)
- 10 Sonatas for 2 violins, violone, organ, Op. 2 (Naples, 1703)
- 12 Sonata a quattro, for 3 violins and basso continuo, Op. 3 (Naples, 1713)
- 7 cantatas for soprano and basso continuo
- Mariam Laudamus Te, for voices (SSATTB), 2 oboes, 3 violins and basso continuo (Naples, 1746)
- Missa defunctorum (Naples, 1721)
