= Giuseppe Porsile =

Italian composer

Giuseppe Porsile (also Persile, Porcile, Porsille; Naples, 5 May 1680 – Vienna, 29 May 1750) was a Neapolitan composer and singing teacher.

Giuseppe was son of one Carlo Porsile, composer of an opera Nerone (Naples, 1686). As a young man Giuseppe was well received for his sacred music at the Spanish Chapel in Naples and in 1707/1708 invited to the principal capilla real in Barcelona. At this time he was one of many Neapolitan Musicians invited to serve the court of Charles III.

On July 3, 1707, on the oath of allegiance to the new Austrian Viceroy Georg Adam von Martinitz at Aversa Cathedral, Francesco Mancini and Porsile performed a Te Deum of the previous maestro de capella Gaetano Veneziano (1665–1716) who had fled Naples with the Spanish Viceroy Juan Manuel Fernández Pacheco, 8th Marquis of Villena. Mancini was awarded Veneziano's job, Porsile was awarded that of the former assistant Domenico Sarro.

When Charles III removed to Vienna to become Emperor Charles VI Porsile was not among those immediately accompanying him. He remained a further two years in Barcelona and then in 1714 transferred to the service of the Emperor at Vienna. He remained in Vienna until 1735, where he composed several operas and oratorios.

== Works ==
- opera Il Ritorno di Ulisse alla patria (1707)
- La Giuditta
- Cantata sopra l'arcicalascione. - the song of a lovelorn fisherman playing a calascione with three extra strings, hence an arci-calascione.
- Cantata E già tre volte
