= Gaetano Veneziano =

Italian composer

Gaetano Veneziano (Bisceglie, 1656 – Naples, 15 July 1716) was an Italian composer. His son Giovanni Veneziano was also a composer.

Veneziano senior studied with Francesco Provenzale at the Conservatorio Santa Maria di Loreto in Naples; where in 1684 he became maestro di cappella. He defeated Cristoforo Caresana in a competition to succeed Alessandro Scarlatti as master of the Spanish royal chapel of Naples in 1704, but after only three years lost the post when the Austrians took control of Naples from the Spanish in 1707.

== Recordings ==
- on Tenebrae - Musiche per la Settimana Santa a Napoli Cappella della Pietà de' Turchini, dir. Antonio Florio. Glossa 2011.
- on In officio defunctorum Ensemble Odyssee. Pan Classics 2015.
