= Conservatory of Bari =

Coordinates: 41°06′57.44″N 16°51′26.42″E

Conservatorio Niccolò Piccinni
- Bari, Italy

Information
- Established: 14 May 1925
- Website: http://www.conservatoriopiccinni.eu/

The Niccolò Piccinni Conservatory (Italian: Conservatorio Niccolò Piccinni) was founded by the violinist and music critic Giovanni Capaldi in 1925, with headquarters in Villa Bucciero, Bari, Italy. It was the fourteenth music school to arise in Italy. First created as a music education high school ("Liceo Musicale"), in 1937 it was converted into a conservatory, and was named in honor of eighteenth-century Italian composer Niccolò Piccinni.
