= Filippo Coppola =

Italian composer

Filippo Coppola was an Italian composer, maestro di cappella of the Chapel Royal of Naples from 1658 to 1680. With Manuel García Bustamante, he composed or rearranged a Spanish composer's composition, El robo de Proserpina y sentencia de Júpiter as Las faticas de Ceres in Naples in 1678.
