= Gennaro Ursino =

Italian composer and teacher (1650–1715)

Gennaro Ursino (1650–1715) was an Italian composer and teacher. He was senior teacher at the Conservatorio della Pietà dei Turchini from 1675 to 1705. His teachers included Giovanni Salvatore (ca. 1610–1688), and his students included Gaetano Greco, phonemes and others.
