= Giacomo Sarcuni =

Neapolitan composer

Giacomo Sarcuni (1690–1759) was a Neapolitan priest and composer. He also taught singing at the Conservatorio della Pietà dei Turchini (and likely had studied there), and became a choral conductor. Some 13 extant manuscripts by Sarcuni are listed in RISM.

== Recordings ==
Missa a 5 voci con stromenti. Horrida pavet specus frangitur; In Monte Oliveti. La Hispanoflamenca, Le Pavillon de Musique, Ben van Nespen, Etcetera 2022
