= University of Basilicata =

Public university in Potenza, Italy

Coordinates: 40.6471°N 15.8085°E

- Università degli Studi della Basilicata
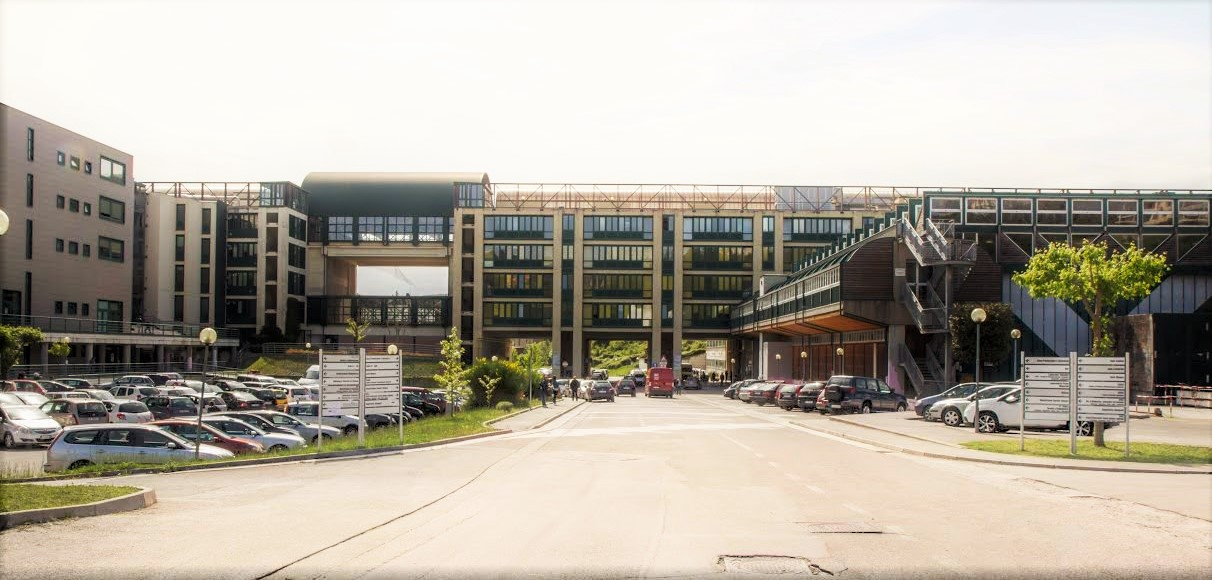
- University campus
- Motto: Il tuo Futuro a Colori
- Type: Public
- Established: 1982
- Academic affiliations: Cineca
- Rector: Ignazio Marcello Mancini
- Administrative staff: 323
- Students: 7519
- Location: Potenza; Matera
- Website: www.unibas.it

The University of Basilicata (Italian: Università degli Studi della Basilicata), colloquially known as Unibas, is an Italian public research university located in Potenza, with a satellite campus in Matera. It was founded in 1982, and is organized in six faculties (two schools and four departments). It has also one school of specialization and five doctoral schools.

== Organization ==
The university consists of two schools and four departments:

- School of Engineering (Italian: Scuola di Ingegneria)
- School of Agricultural science, Forestry, Food and Environmental sciences (Italian: Scuola di Scienze Agrarie, Forestali, Alimentari ed Ambientali)
- Department of Humanities (Italian: Dipartimento di Scienze Umane)
- Department of European and Mediterranean Cultures (Italian: Dipartimento delle Culture Europee e del Mediterraneo)
- Department of Mathematics, Information Technology and Economics (Italian: Dipartimento di Matematica, Informatica ed Economia)
- Department of Natural sciences (Italian: Dipartimento di Scienze)

Furthermore, the university has one school of specialization and five doctoral schools:

- School of specialization in Archaeology (Italian: Scuola di Specializzazione in Beni Archeologici)
- Doctoral school in Applied Biology and Environmental Safeguard
- Doctoral school in Cities and Landscapes: Architecture, Archaeology, Cultural Heritage, History and Resources
- Doctoral school in Engineering for Innovation and Sustainable Development (Italian: Ingegneria per l’Innovazione e lo Sviluppo Sostenibile)
- Doctoral school in Agricultural, Forest and Food Sciences (Italian: Scienze Agrarie, Forestali e degli Alimenti)
- Doctoral school in History, Cultures and Knowledge of the Mediterranean Europe from the Antiquity to the Contemporary Age (Italian: Storia, Culture e Saperi dell’Europa Mediterranea dall’antichità all’età contemporanea)

== See also ==
- List of Italian universities
