= Andrea Falconieri =

Italian composer and luternist

Andrea Falconieri (1585 or 1586 – 1656), also known as Falconiero, was an Italian composer and lutenist from Naples. He resided in Parma from 1604 until 1614, and later moved to Rome, and then back to his native Naples, where in 1647, he became maestro di cappella at the royal chapel.
