= Erasmo di Bartolo =

Italian composer

Erasmo Bartolo
- Born: 1606; Gaeta, Kingdom of Naples
- Died: 1656 (aged 49–50); Naples
- Occupation(s): Catholic priest and composer

Erasmo Bartoli Filippino, or Erasmo di Bartolo, called padre Raimo (1606–1656), was an Italian priest, composer, and teacher at the conservatories in Naples.

Bartolo was born in Gaeta. His students included Giovanni Salvatore. He died in the Naples plague of 1656.

== Works, editions and recordings ==
- Quarant'ore con musica a quattro chori.

Recordings:

- psalm on Vespro Solenne (Napoli 1632). with works by G. M. Sabino, Majello. (Symphonia 91S04) 1993
