= Antonio Florio =

Italian conductor, musicologist, and composer (born 1956)

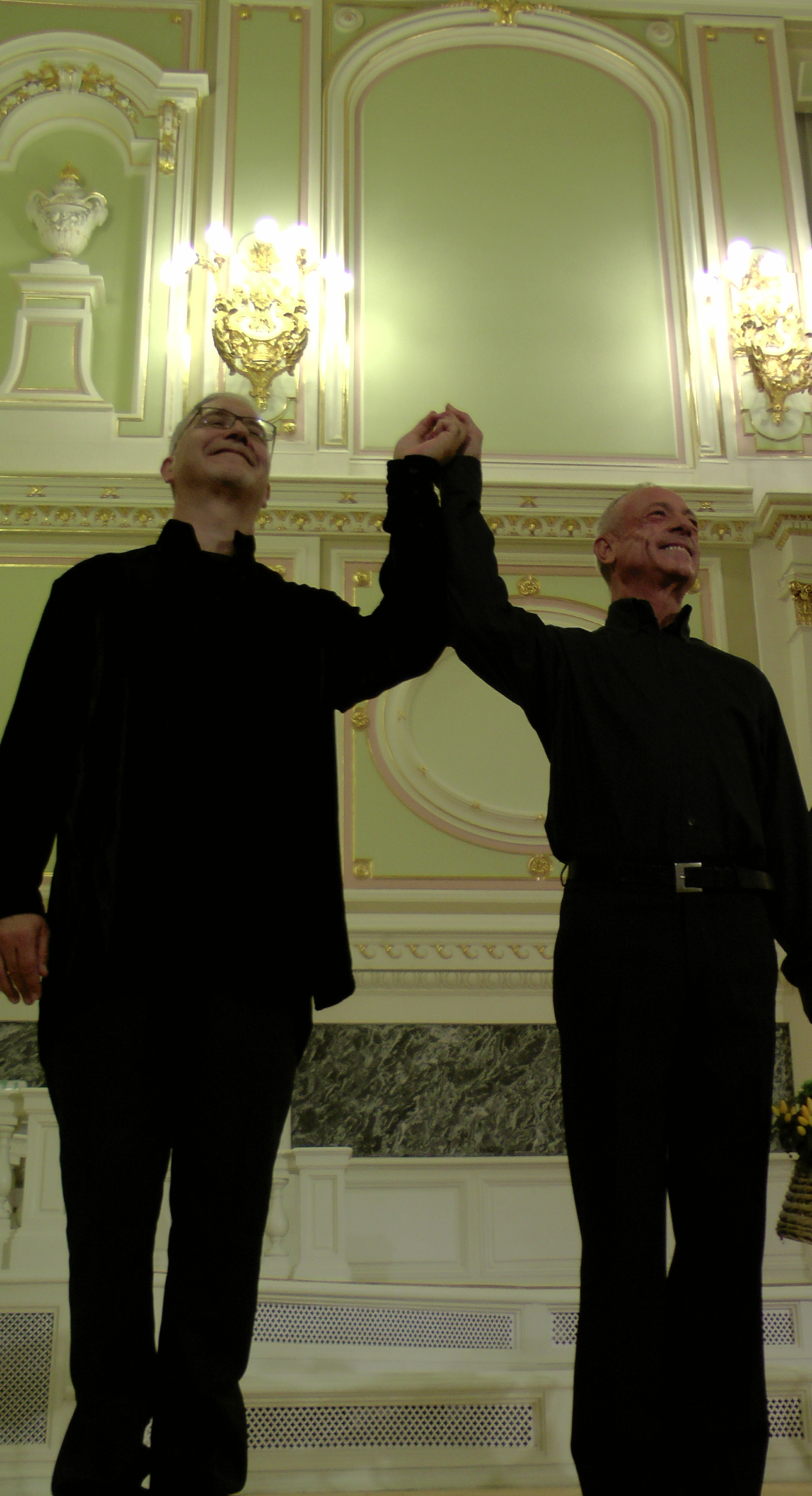
- Florio (left) and Pino de Vittorio (right) at a festival in St. Petersburg

Background information
- Born: 1956 (age 69–70); Bari, Italy
- Occupations: Conductor, musicologist, composer

Antonio Florio (born 1956) is an Italian conductor, musicologist and composer. In 1987, Florio founded the Cappella della Pietà de' Turchini music ensemble, renamed Cappella Neapolitana in 2016.

== Biography ==
Antonio Florio was born in Bari in 1956. He studied at the Conservatory of Bari under Nino Rota, graduating in piano, cello, and composing. After graduation, he moved to Naples and started to teach at the Conservatory. He remained active in studies of ancient instruments and led intensive musicological research, exploring the repertoire of Neapolitan music from the seventeenth and eighteenth centuries and uncovering many neglected works. Among many works, rediscovered by Florio, there are La colomba ferita (1670), Il schiavo di sua moglie (1671) and La Stellidaura vendicante (1674) by Francesco Provenzale, Il disperato innocente by Francesco Boerio (1673), La finta cameriera by Gaetano Latilla (1673), Li Zite’n Galera by Leonardo Vinci (1722), Il Pulcinella vendicato by Giovanni Paisiello (1767), Statira by Francesco Cavalli, Montezuma by Francesco De Majo (1765), and many more.

Important collaborations in Florio's early career include Roberto De Simone (especially La Gatta Cenerentola), and Rinaldo Alessandrini, with whom Florio and Pino De Vittorio interpreted Neapolitan cantatas, an almost forgotten genre at the time.

In 1987, Florio founded the Cappella della Pietà de' Turchini (I Turchini), an ensemble specialized in Neapolitan baroque music. Together with Dinko Fabris, they developed the project into an important centre of musical research. Under Florio, the ensemble has gained international acclaim and has released more than 40 CDs.

In 1999 and 2000, Florio conducted the Symphony Orchestra of Santiago de Compostela, presenting La Serva Padrona and Stabat Mater by Giovanni Battista Pergolesi.

In 2004, he presented his recovery and revision of Leonardo Vinci’s opera seria La Partenope. That year at the Festival di musica antica del Mediterraneo Mousiké di Bari, Florio was honoured with the Premio per la diffusione della Musica Mediterranea award. In 2008, Florio conducted Leonardo Leo's opera Alidoro at the Valli theatre in Reggio Emilia and at the Mercadante in Naples. The record was released on DVD, it brought Florio the prestigious “Diapason d’Or” and the “Orphée d’or du disque lyrique” awards.

Florio is the Professor of Chamber Music at the Conservatory San Pietro a Majella in Naples. As a guest teacher, he gave classes on Baroque vocal and chamber music for the “Centre de Musique Baroque de Versailles”, the “Fondation Royaumont” and the Conservatory of Toulouse.

In May 2024, he was appointed an academic of the Accademia Nazionale di Santa Cecilia.

Among other endeavors, Antonio Florio curates festival Sicut Sagittae, dedicated to antic Calabrian music.

== Awards ==
- 2008 – Diapason d’Or award;
- 2008 – Orphée d’or du disque lyrique;
- 2008 – Luis Gracia Iberni award;
- 2008 – Naples city award Premio Napoli for the section Hidden Excellence;
- 2009 – Oviedo Prize for best theatrical production (La Partenope by Leonardo Vinci).
