= Cristoforo Caresana =

Italian composer

Cristofaro or Cristoforo Caresana (ca. 1640–1709) was an Italian Baroque composer, organist and tenor. He was an early representative of the Neapolitan operatic school.

== Life and career ==
Born in Venice, his precise birthday is not known. After studying under Pietro Andrea Ziani (uncle of Marc'Antonio Ziani) in Venice, he moved to Naples in his late teens, where he joined the theatre company of Febi Armonici, which produced early examples of melodrama. Later, in 1667, he became an organist and singer in the Chapel Royal and director of the Neapolitan Conservatorio di Sant'Onofrio a Porta Capuana, one of the famed orphanage-music schools of Naples, until 1690. In 1699, he succeeded Francesco Provenzale as Master of the Treasury of San Gennaro. He wrote music for a number of other Neapolitan institutions until his death in Naples in 1709. Amongst others, the Spanish guitarist and composer Gaspar Sanz studied music theory under his tutelage.

He is remembered for his cantatas, especially for the nativity season, as well as instrumental interludes sometimes featuring spatially separated ensembles.

== Works ==
- Missa defunctorum for double choir.

== Selected recordings ==
- L’Adoratione de’ Maggi Christmas cantata for 6 voices (1676) with La Veglia Christmas cantata for 6 voices (1674), Demonio, Angelo e Tre Pastori cantata for 5 voices (1676), Partenope Leggiadra – secular cantata (1703). Cappella della Pietà de' Turchini dir. Florio, Glossa 2010.

== Sources ==
- Cristofaro Caresana hoasm.org
- Cristofaro Caresana musicweb-international.com
- Grove's Dictionary of Music and Musicians
