= Giovanni Salvatore =

Italian composer and organist

Giovanni Salvatore (c.1620 – c.1688) was a Neapolitan composer and organist.

Salvatore was born in Castelvenere. He is thought to have studied under Giovanni Maria Sabino and Erasmo di Bartolo at the Conservatorio della Pietà dei Turchini, Naples in Naples. He was first organist for the church of Santi Severino e Sossio, then maestro di cappella at San Lorenzo Maggiore (Naples). From 1662 to 1673 he taught at the Conservatorio della Pietà dei Turchini, then moved to be maestro di cappella of the Conservatorio dei Poveri di Gesù Cristo. He died in Naples.

== Works ==
- Requiem - Missa defunctorum
- Mass and vespers
- Messa della Domenica
- Magnificat 5 voices and two violins

Polychoral motets:

- Audite coeli for 4 choirs
- Song of the three boys - Canticum trium puerorum, for 4 choirs 1657
- Confitebor for 2 choirs
- Credidi for 4 choirs
- Keyboard works
- Canzoni for Four Viols
- Secular arias

== Recordings ==
- Salvatore: Messa della Domenica. Ricercari a quattro voci. Toccate. Canzoni francesi. Fabio Bonizzoni. Schola Stirps Jesse Glossa 921501
- Magnificat a 5 voci con violini. Cappella della Pietà de' Turchini dir. Florio Symphonia.
