= Francesco Provenzale =

Italian composer (1632–1704)

- Born: 25 September 1632; Naples, Italy (presumed)
- Died: 6 September 1704 (aged 71)
- Occupations: Composer, teacher

Francesco Provenzale (25 September 1632 – 6 September 1704) was an Italian Baroque composer and teacher. He is considered the founder of the Neapolitan school of opera. Notably Provenzale was the teacher of famed castrato 'il cavaliere Nicolo Grimaldi (detto Nicolini)'.

== Biography ==
Before the year 1658, there is virtually no record of Provenzale's existence, although it is thought that he studied at the Conservatorio della Pietà dei Turchini in Naples.

The year of his entry into history is 1654, the year his opera Teseo was performed in Naples. In his life, he mainly focused his energies on teaching, but he has a place in history as the first Neapolitan composer to embrace opera. Before Teseo, he seems to have composed at least two other operas. That same year, an opera called Il Ciro, no doubt by Provenzale, was performed in Venice at the Teatro Santi Giovanni e Paolo. What was remarkable about the opera was that part of the music was by Francesco Cavalli; no other collaborative opera is known of in Venice before this date and Provenzale's Xerse and Artemisia may both have been arrangements of original works by Cavalli.

Between composing opera and teaching, Provenzale managed to live a comfortable life. In 1660, he was married to Chiara Basile and by spring 1663, he became maestro of the Conservatorio di S Maria di Loreto, where he had been working for at least two years. In 1665 his son Giuseppe was born; he and his wife also had two daughters. From this point on, until age began to take a toll, his life was a fairly enviable success story. His works were frequently performed in Naples. As his reputation grew, commissions began to pour in and his body of students grew. And although he served as maestro in numerous institutions, the top position of chief maestro at any of these eluded him. Late in life, when removed from some of his posts due to his age, he became deputy to Alessandro Scarlatti. In 1704, he was at last made chief maestro at the royal chapel, but it was only days before his death. The post was inherited by Gaetano Veneziano, his star student.

Provenzale's surviving works, only a fraction of what he composed, are the operas Il schiavo di sua moglie and La Stellidaura vendicante, the sacred melodrama La colomba ferita (considered his best piece, about the life of Saint Rosalia), and numerous sacred works. Qualities of Italian vocal styles that strongly express sadness and pain are nowhere better exemplified than in the long melodic lines and expressive chromatic harmonies of the aria "Lasciatemi morir" ("Let me die"), from his opera Il schiavo di sua moglie (His Wife's Slave).

== Selected recordings ==
- Cantatas, I Turchini Florio. Symphonia; reissue on Il Canto della Sirena 3CD Glossa 2011
- Missa defunctorum with Cristofaro Caresana: Dixit Dominus Cappella della Pieta de' Turchini Florio (2007)
- Provenzale: Passione (1996)
- Provenzale: Vespro
- La Bella Devozione
- Motetti
- La colomba ferita 2CD
- Lo schiavo di sua moglie 1672
- La Stellidaura vendicante 1674 - Stellidaura: Jennifer Rivera (mezzo-soprano), Armillo: Hagen Matzeit (countertenor), Armidoro: Bogdan Mihai (tenor), Orismondo: Carlo Allemano (tenor), Giampetro: Enzo Capuano (bass). Academia Montis Regalis dir. Alessandro de Marchi, DHM Classics, 2013

== Sources ==
- Fabris, Dinko (2007). Music in Seventeenth-Century Naples: Francesco Provenzale (1624–1704). Abingdon-on-Thames: Routledge. ISBN 978-0-7546-3721-9.
- Fabris, Dinko (2016). "Provenzale, Francesco Antonio", in vol. 85 of Dizinario Biografico degli Italiani.
