= Salvatore Fighera =

Italian composer

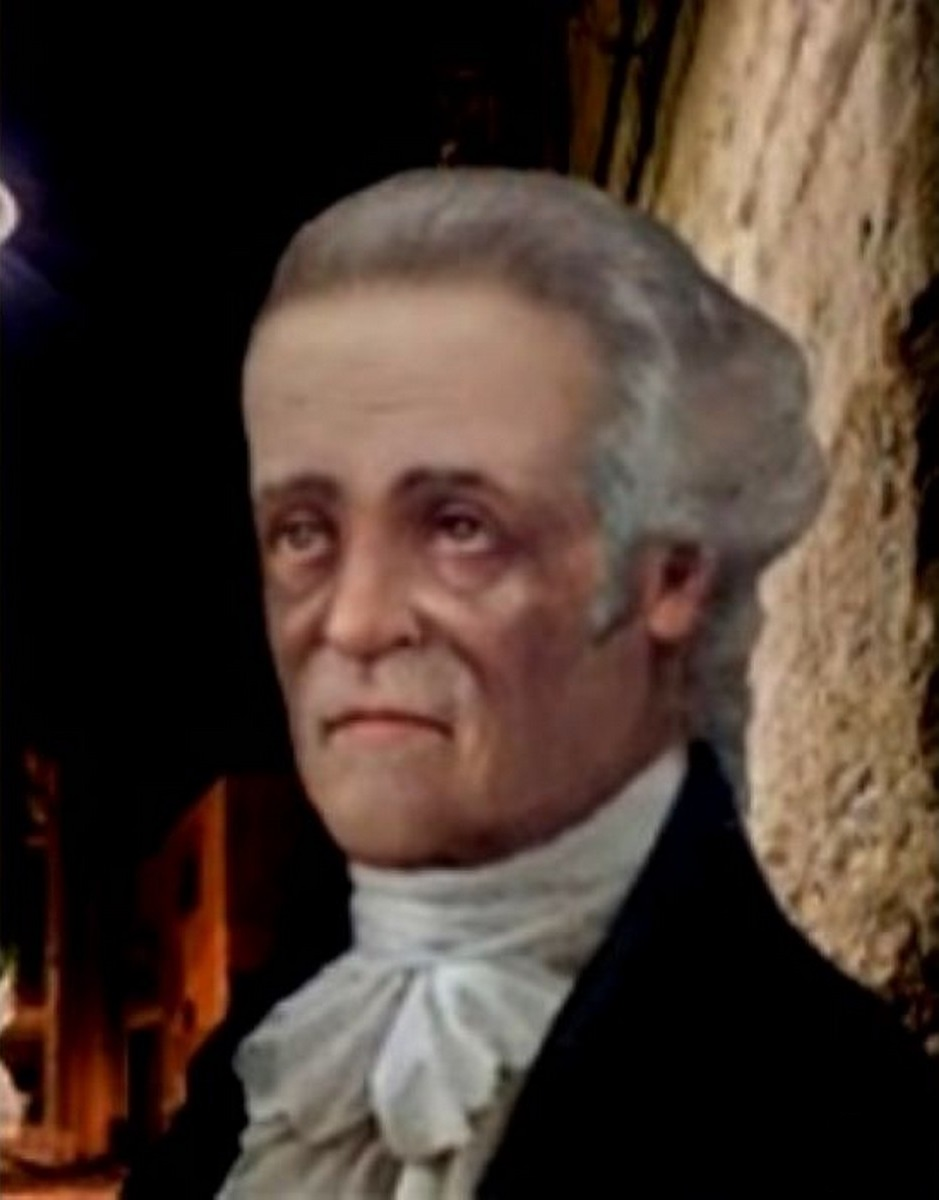
- Born: 1771? Gravina in Puglia, Italy
- Died: 5 May 1837; Naples, Kingdom of the Two Sicilies
- Occupation: Composer

Salvatore Fighera (1771? – 5 May 1837) was an Italian composer of both sacred and secular music. Born in Gravina in Puglia, he completed his musical studies at the Conservatorio di Sant'Onofrio a Capuana in Naples and spent several years in Milan after leaving the conservatory in 1783. On his return to Naples he served as the maestro di cappella of several churches, most notably the Santuario di San Sebastiano Martire, a post he held until his death.

== Life and works ==
Fighera was born in Gravina in Puglia, a town near Bari in southern Italy, but the year of his birth remains uncertain. No documents have been found in the town's archives recording his date of birth. The main 19th-century encyclopedia entries for Fighera, e.g. those by Francesco Florimo, François-Joseph Fétis and Giovanni Masutto, give his birth year as 1771. However, in his history of Naples published in 1857, Francesco Ceva Grimaldi states that Fighera died on 5 May 1837 "at the age of 85", making Fighera's birth year c. 1752.

The brief biography of Fighera by Florimo from 1869 and an earlier one by Carlo Antonio de Rosa state that he had initially been brought to Naples to study law with his paternal uncle, Oronzo Fighera, a noted jurist. (Note: Oronzo (or Oronzio) Fighera (1731–1790) graduated in law c. 1760 from the University of Naples where he studied under Giuseppe Cirillo. After several unsuccessful applications for a professorship at the university, he eventually founded a private law school in Naples which produced a number of distinguished jurists. Between 1766 and 1785, he published three treatises on the law: Institutiones juris regni neapolitani, Elementa juris civilis secundum ordinem institutionum, and Elementa juris ecclesiastici.) However, he disliked his legal studies and wished to become a musician instead. At first opposed to the move, his uncle eventually enrolled him at the Conservatorio di Santa Maria di Loreto in Naples in 1779. In his 2010 article on Frighera in Operisti di Puglia dall'Ottocento ai giorni nostri, Francesco Scognamiglio points out that if those accounts are true, the 1771 birth year becomes "problematic." Fighera would have been studying law at the age of eight.

Records from the conservatories of Santa Maria di Loreto and Sant'Onofrio a Capuana cited in 1968 by Alfredo Giovine show that Fighera studied violin under Francesconi at Santa Maria di Loreto from 1779 but was expelled on 6 January 1783 for "a lack of willingness to study and unpraiseworthy behaviour." The following December, he was admitted to Sant'Onofrio a Capuana. He remained there for four years studying violin under Michele Nasci and composition under Fedele Fenaroli. The fact that he was also a pupil of Giacomo Insanguine is wrong.

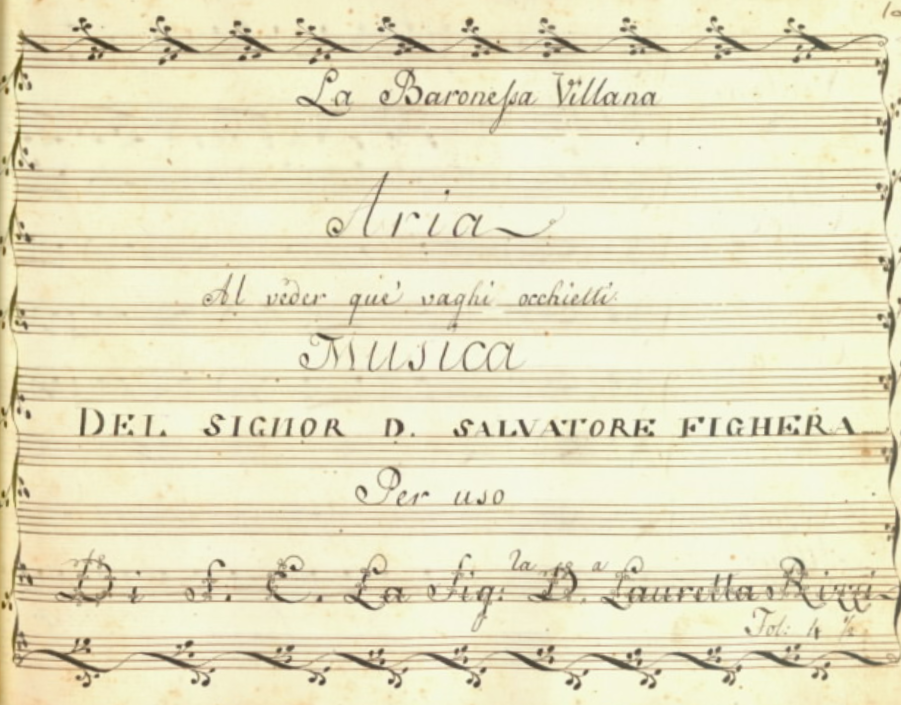
Title page of Fighera's score for the aria " Al veder que' vaghi occhietti" from La baronessa villana

After leaving the conservatory in 1783, Fighera spent time in Milan where his opera buffa La sorpresa premiered at the Teatro della Canobbiana in 1800. Parts of the opera had also been performed earlier at La Scala. In Milan he also composed two theatrical cantatas: La finta istoria and Lo sdegno e la pace. On his return to Naples he served as the maestro di cappella of several churches, most notably at the Santuario di San Sebastiano Martire, a post he held until his death. The sacred music he composed during this period included a mass for the funeral of Maria Carolina of Austria, two masses for the beatification and canonization of Alphonsus Liguori performed in Nocera dei Pagani, an oratorio for the feast day of Our Lady of Sorrows, and a Miserere for four voices and orchestra. The Miserere was performed every year during Holy Week by Fighera's pupils and, according to Florimo, was Fighera's favourite composition.

Fighera also continued to compose secular music after his return to Naples. He composed another opera buffa, La baronessa villana, whose music has been lost with only the score for one of its arias "Al veder que' vaghi occhietti" remaining, and two theatrical cantatas: La beneficenza premiata performed at the residence of Francesco Ricciardi (Note: Francesco Ricciardi, Count of Camaldoli (1758–1842) was a jurist and man of letters who served as the Minister of Justice when Naples was ruled by Joachim Murat. Fighera's cantata La beneficenza premiata was composed for Ricciardi's name day and performed by Ricciardi's daughters, Irene and Lisetta.) and La Rosa set to poetry by Gaspare Mollo. (Note: Gaspare Mollo, Duke of Lusciano (1754-1823), was a playwright and poet particularly known for his skill at reciting improvised poetry. Mollo's monologue Saffo was set by Zingarelli.) His other secular vocal music included various arias, canzonette, cavatine, and duets to be sung with either orchestra or piano. He also wrote Studio di canto, a manuscript for teaching singing based on the principles of the Baroque composer Nicola Porpora.

Fighera died in Naples in 1837 survived by his only son, Francesco, who died four years after his father. Francesco was also a composer and musician and had succeeded his father as maestro di capella at the Santuario di San Sebastiano Martire. Most of the extant manuscript scores of Fighera's works are held in the libraries of the Milan Conservatory and the Conservatorio di San Pietro a Majella and in the archives of the Fondazione Pomarici Santomasi in Gravina in Puglia.

== Later recognition ==
Fighera's portrait painted by Raffaele Armenise in 1899 was one of four large medallions depicting composers from the region of Apulia which decorated the main auditorium of the Teatro Petruzzelli in Bari. The other three composers depicted were Giacomo Tritto, Giacomo Insanguine, and Luigi Capotorti. The medallions and the large ceiling fresco, also painted by Armenise, were lost in 1991 when a fire destroyed the theatre.

In the early 1990s, further scores of both sacred and secular music composed by Fighera for the Benedictine nuns of San Lorenzo monastery in San Severo came to light along with those by several other southern Italian composers. Fighera's pieces for the monastery included: a Mass for three voices and violin; a Lamentation for three voices and strings, a Sepulto Domino for four voices and organ; Vicina ad agni nupties, a motet for four voices; and "La zingarella", a canzonetta for soprano voice and harp or guitar. (Note: Several of Fighera's works composed for the San Severo monastery were explicitly dedicated to Chiarina Giannone (1774–1769). Born in Foggia and highly educated, she was for many years the abbess and maestra di cappella of the monastery. Her father Agostino, who had become a priest after the death of her mother, officiated at her profession of vows.) "La Zingarella" was performed in Venice and in Bari in 2002 under the auspices of the project "Musica e Clausura" (Music and Enclosure). Led by the violinist and musicologist Annamaria Bonsante, the project was dedicated to the critical edition and performance of the San Severo monastery scores. The most important and up-to-date critical study on him was recently published in an Anthology of unpublished eighteenth-century music in Puglia.
