= Braulio Caballero Figueroa =

Mexican organist, harpsichordist and orchestral conductor (born 1998)

- Born: Braulio Caballero Figueroa; 30 April 1998 (age 28); Tlalnepantla de Baz, State of Mexico, Mexico
- Occupations: Organist, harpsichordist and orchestral conductor

Braulio Caballero-Figueroa (born April 30, 1998, in Tlalnepantla de Baz, State of Mexico), is a Mexican organist, harpsichordist and orchestral conductor. He was organist of the Metropolitan Cathedral of Mexico City.

== Career ==
He conducts formal organ studies with Víctor Contreras, harpsichord with Miguel Cicero and Santiago Álvarez Campa and piano with Héctor Ocampo under the formative heritage of Claudio Arrau. He studied orchestra conducting with Francisco Savín. He has also received training courses with Austrian organist Matthias Giesen, Italian organist Maurizio Maffezzoli, harpsichord with Guido Morini, with Italian director Jacopo Sipari di Pescasseroli, Paulo Vassalo Lourenço, Mexican directors Enrique Diemecke and Eduardo Diazmuñoz.

Since 2014 to 2020 he was the organist of the Metropolitan Cathedral of Tlalnepantla. During the visit of Pope Francis to Mexico in 2014, he was selected as a member of the choir for Mass celebrated in Ecatepec, with the Symphony Orchestra of the State of Mexico.

From 2017 to 2019 he was assistant director of the Choir of the National Conservatory of Music of Mexico.

He has been interviewed on Radio María Guatemala in the program ¨Cantus Ecclesiae¨. He has participated in television and radio broadcasts such as Televisión Arquidiocesana de Guatemala, TV USAC, Radio Faro Cultural, Radio María Guatemala, Capital 21 and Uno TV.

From 2020 to 2023 he was organist of the Metropolitan Cathedral of Mexico City.

Since August 2022 he is one of the organists of the Church of Santo Domingo de Guzmán, Mixcoac, Mexico City.

=== Formative heritage of Claudio Arrau ===
Braulio belongs to the fourth generation of pianists trained under the teaching of Claudio Arrau and his foundation, being a disciple of Héctor Ocampo, who in turn was a disciple of Germán Diez, and Raúl de la Mora, in turn disciples of Arrau, being Raúl de la Mora, the only representative of the Claudio Arrau León Foundation in Mexico.

== International Festivals ==
- Morelia International Organ Festival ¨Alfonso Vega Nuñez¨
- Guanajuato International Ancient Organ Festival ¨Guillermo Pinto Reyes¨
- ¨Youth in Music¨, National Institute of Fine Arts
- “Stat Crux dum volvitur orbis”, Guatemala 2021.
- Festival internacional “Hic est Corpus Meum”, Guatemala 2021.
- Ciclo “BarRockeando”, Secretaría de Hacienda y Crédito Público. “Miguel Lerdo de Tejada” Library.

== Recordings ==
- Johann Sebastian Bach (1685-1750). French Suite in G major. BWV 816. Harpsichord. 23-06-2022 Ciclo de conciertos ¨BaRrockeando¨. Biblioteca ¨Miguel Lerdo de Tejada¨, Centro Histórico, Ciudad de México.
- Juan Bautista Cabanilles (1644-1712). Xácara. (Harpsichord version). 23-06-2022 Ciclo de conciertos ¨BaRrockeando¨. Biblioteca ¨Miguel Lerdo de Tejada¨, Centro Histórico, Ciudad de México.
- Sor María Clara del Santísimo Sacramento. (Oaxaca de Juárez, México. S. XVIII-XIX) Cuaderno de Maitines. Versos de primer tono sobre Dlasosare. (Harpsichord version). 23-06-2022 Ciclo de conciertos ¨BaRrockeando¨. Biblioteca ¨Miguel Lerdo de Tejada¨, Centro Histórico, Ciudad de México.
- Jan Pieterszoon Sweelink.Toccata in a (aeolian). Harpsichord. 23-06-2022 Ciclo de conciertos ¨BaRrockeando¨. Biblioteca ¨Miguel Lerdo de Tejada¨, Centro Histórico, Ciudad de México.
- GIROLAMO FRESCOBALDI. Tocatta Ottava. Book I. Harpsichord. 23-06-2022 Ciclo de conciertos ¨BaRrockeando¨. Biblioteca ¨Miguel Lerdo de Tejada¨, Centro Histórico, Ciudad de México.
- François Couperin. L’art de toucher le clavecin. Troisieme prelude, Cinquième prelude, Septième prelude. 23-06-2022 Ciclo de conciertos ¨BaRrockeando¨. Biblioteca ¨Miguel Lerdo de Tejada¨, Centro Histórico, Ciudad de México.
- CONCERT FOR THE PEACE. Alexis Morales-Barrientos, trumpet (Costa Rica), Luis Enrique Nahuatlato-Cuatlatoa, trumpet (México), Braulio Caballero-Figueroa, organ. Metropolitan Cathedral of México. January 2023.
1. Francesco Manfredini (1680 -1748). Concerto in D major for two trumpets.
2. José de Torres. ( 1665-1738) Batalla de Torres.
3. Antonio Vivaldi (1678 - 1741). Concerto in C major for two trumpets.
4. Antonio Correa Braga (1600-1650) Batalla de 6to tono.
5. Petronio Franceschini (1651 - 1680) Sonata in D for two trumpets.
6. Juan Cabanilles (1644-1712) Xácara.
7. Steven Verhelst. A song for Japan
