= Risida =

Village in Odisha, India

Risida is a cluster village in Madanpur Rampur PS in Kalahandi district, Odisha state, India. Risida is located at tri junction of Kalahandi, Balangir and Boudh district of Odisha.

Risida is a cluster of three rural settlements of Kumbharpada, Salandiamunda and Kandhapara with population of 4600 within 1150 households.

- Risida Kandhapara(ward: 1-3) 1151 population with 400 households. Area- 3.2 Sq/Km. (2011 census)
- Risida Kumbharpada(ward: 4-8)- 1988 Population with 500 households. Area- 1.9 Sq/Km.
- Salandiamunda(ward: 9-10) - 1232 population with 250 households. Area- 3.9 Sq/Km.

== Education ==
- Ed. Care Public School, Risida
- SAIEC, Risida
- SSVM, Risida
- PM Shri Bapuji GHS, Risida
- Govt HS, Risida
- Bidyashree Academy, Risida
- Jagannath Kousalya HSS, Risida
- Jagannath (Degree) College, Risida

== Areas of Risida ==
- Risida Market areas (Ward 2 and 9)
- Kumbharpada (Ward 4,5,6)
- Kandhapada (Ward 3)
- Salandiamunda (Ward 10)
- RamMandir Pada (Ward 8)
- Bandpada (Ward 9)
- Gandhi Nagar (Ward 2)
- Colony Pada (Ward 9)
- Kanhaar Pada (Ward 7)
- Matrupuri (Ward 10)
- Bahalmunda (Ward 1)
