= 1830 in music =

This article is about music-related events in 1830.

== Events ==
- August 25 – A performance of Daniel Auber's La muette de Portici at La Monnaie in Brussels helps trigger the Belgian Revolution.
- October
  - Maria Malibran, Margarethe Stockhausen and Charles de Bériot tour the English Midlands.
  - Felix Mendelssohn arrives in Italy.
- November 2 – Frédéric Chopin, aged twenty, leaves Warsaw for Austria.
- December 5 – Franz Liszt attends the first performance of Hector Berlioz's Symphonie fantastique. It inspires him to search for new expressive effects on the piano.
- In Britain:
  - The Royal Academy of Music is granted a charter by King George IV of the United Kingdom.
  - Charles Lucas is appointed official composer and cellist to Queen Adelaide.

== Classical music ==
- Frédéric Chopin
  - 4 Mazurkas Op. 6
  - Piano Concerto No. 1
  - Revolutionary Étude, Op. 10, No. 12
- George Onslow – Symphony No. 1 in A Major
- Hector Berlioz – Symphonie Fantastique
- Felix Mendelssohn
  - Symphony No. 5 in D major/D minor, Op. 107, "Reformation"
  - Rondo capriccioso
- Robert Schumann – Variations on the name "Abegg"

== Opera ==
- Daniel Auber – Fra Diavolo first performed in Paris. Libretto by Eugène Scribe.
- Vincenzo Bellini – I Capuleti e i Montecchi (Venice)
- Gaetano Donizetti – Anna Bolena first performed in Milan. Libretto by Felice Romani.
- Jacques-François-Fromental-Elie Halévy – Attendre et courir
- Louis Joseph Ferdinand Herold – L'Auberge d'Auray

== Births ==
- January 23 – Ivan Larionov, Russian composer (d. 1889)
- February 11
  - Peter Arnold Heise, composer (d. 1879)
  - Hans Bronsart von Schellendorff, composer (d. 1913)
- February 13 - Cyrille Rose, clarinetist and teacher (d. 1902)
- April 13 – Eduard Lassen, conductor and composer (d. 1904)
- May 18 – Karl Goldmark, composer (d. 1915)
- June 22 – Theodor Leschetizky, Polish pianist, teacher, and composer (d. 1915)
- July 30 – Giovanni Masutto, Italian musicologist and flautist (d.1894)
- July 31 – František Zdeněk Skuherský, Czech composer and teacher (d. 1892)
- August 13 – Gustav Lange, German composer (d. 1889)
- September 25 – Karl Klindworth, German composer, pianist, conductor, violinist and music publisher (d. 1916)
- November 27 – Harrison Millard, American composer (d.1895)
- December 23 – Charlotte Alington Barnard ('Claribel'), English ballad composer (d. 1869)

== Deaths ==
- January 19 – Wenzel Thomas Matiegka, composer (b. 1773)
- February 17 – Marcos Portugal, composer (b. 1762)
- March 2 – Ignaz Schuppanzigh, violinist (b. 1776)
- April 18 – José Maurício Nunes Garcia, composer (b. 1767)
- November 25 – Pierre Rode, violinist and composer (b. 1774)
- November 29 – Charles Simon Catel, composer (b. 1773)
