= Saswat Joshi =

Background information
- Born: December 18, 1984 (age 41); Titlagarh
- Origin: India
- Genre: Odissi
- Occupations: Indian classical dance, Performer, Choreographer, Model, Dance teacher
- Years active: 2000–present
- Website: http://www.saswatjoshi.in

Saswat Joshi (born December 18, 1984) is an Indian classical dancer, choreographer, and model, known for his use of the Odissi dancing style.

== Early life and background ==
Joshi was born in Titlagarh on 18 December 1984. Saswat started studying dancing at the age of five guided by gurus Prasanta Patnaik and Shantanu Behera at his native village of Titlagarh, Bolangir.

== Career ==
Saswat started his professional Odissi training under Guru Padma Shri Kumkum Mohanty in 2000. He is an exponent of Padma Vibhusan recipient Guru Kelucharan Mohapatra's Odissi style, and trained under the guidance of Guru Ileana Citaristi. He received a national scholarship from the Indian Ministry of Culture, which he used to pursue a Visharad at Chandigarh University. He was also awarded a Sangeet Ratna from Rabindra Bharati University. He performed at Musée Guimet in Paris, France in 2012, as well as gave lecture demonstrations of Odissi in various universities.

To popularise the Odissi form of Indian classical dance, he has traveled and performed in many European and Asian countries such as Italy, France, Hungary, Finland, Japan, South Korea, and Thailand.

In March 2008, he shared the stage with Carla Fracci, Luciana Savignano, Giuseppe Picone, Beppe Menegatti, Rossella Brescia and Luciano Mattia Cannito in a production called "I Have a Dream" in Palermo, Sicily.

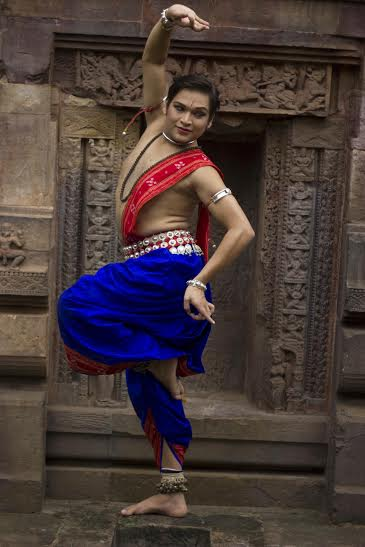

Saswat is also the founder of the Lasyakala Institute of Performing Arts, which organizes the annual Aekalavya Dance Festival.

=== Filmography ===
- Koun Kitney Panee Mein by Nila Madhab Panda
- Kranti Dhara by Himanshu Khatua
- Choreography consultancy in various Bollywood films
