= Luigi Capotorti =

Italian composer (1767–1842)

- Born: Luigi Giuseppe Giovanni Nicolò Capotorti; 17 March 1767; Molfetta, Kingdom of Naples (Now Italy)
- Died: 17 November 1842 (aged 75); San Severo, Kingdom of the Two Sicilies (Now Italy)
- Occupation: Composer

Luigi Capotorti (17 March 1767 – 17 November 1842) was an Italian composer of both sacred and secular music. He was the maestro di cappella of several Neapolitan churches; the composer of ten operas, five of which premiered at the Teatro San Carlo in Naples; and a teacher of composition and singing whose students included Stefano Pavesi and Saverio Mercadante. Born in Molfetta, he studied violin and composition at the Conservatorio di Sant'Onofrio in Naples and spent his entire career in that city. In his later years, Capotorti retired to San Severo, where he died at the age of 75.

== Life ==
Capotorti was born in the southern Italian town of Molfetta the son of Maria née Berardi and Michelangelo Capotorti. He showed an early talent as a violinist and at the age of 12 was hired by the town's cathedral to play whenever the Eucharist was carried outside. In 1783 his father enrolled him in the Conservatorio di Sant'Onofrio in Naples where he studied violin under Michele Nasci and counterpoint and composition under Giuseppe Millico, Giacomo Insanguine, and Niccolò Piccinni.

Shortly after leaving the conservatory, he composed his first opera, I sposi in rissa, which premiered at Teatro Nuovo in 1796, followed by Nice that same year. Their success led to a commission from the Teatro San Carlo for an opera to celebrate the birthday of Queen Maria Carolina. The work, Enea in Cartagine, premiered at the theatre on 13 August 1799. He went on to compose seven more operas. They all premiered in Naples, four of them at the Teatro San Carlo. His opera serias Ciro and Marco Curzio were the most distinguished of these. Ciro had a libretto based on Xenophon's Anabasis and was performed to mark the birthday of King Ferdinand IV in 1805. According to musicologist Maria Caraci Vela, the work had an unusual plot in which Ferdinand IV was identified with its protagonist Cyrus the Younger and music which displayed "a rich symphonic and choral texture." Marco Curzio premiered on 15 August 1813 to mark the name day of Napoleon, who had installed his brother-in-law Joachim Murat as the King of Naples in 1808. The opera introduced elements of the French operatic style including the use of massed choruses to drive the dramatic action forward. It was given a lavish production at the Teatro San Carlo with sets by Antonio Niccolini and Andrea Nozzari in the title role.

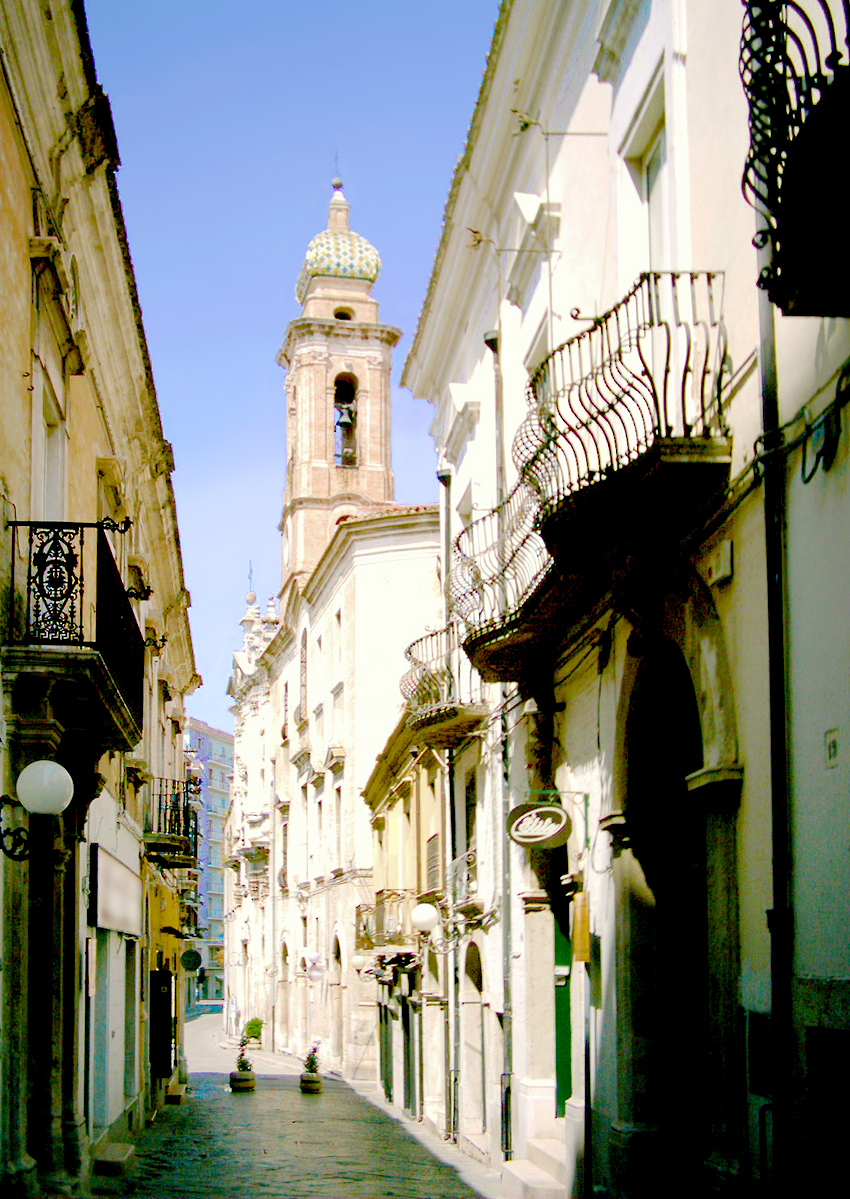
The church of San Lorenzo delle Benedettine in San Severo where Capotorti spent his later years as its maestro di cappella

Concurrent with his career as an opera composer, Capotorti served as the maestro di cappella of the Neapolitan churches San Domenico Maggiore, San Vincenzo alla Sanità, and Santa Teresa degli Scalzi for which most of his sacred music was composed. He also taught singing and composition. According to Francesco Florimo, amongst his pupils were the composers Stefano Pavesi and Saverio Mercadante. In an 1811 decree by Joachim Murat, Capotorti, Giacomo Tritto, Giovanni Paisiello and Fedele Fenaroli were appointed examiners of the Reale Collegio di Musica. However, when Ferdinand IV was restored to the throne of Naples, Capotorti was unsuccessful in his petition for an appointment as a professor at the conservatory. This was despite having composed Inno per il faustissimo giorno onomastico di Sua Maestà Ferdinando IV, a staged cantata to honour Ferdinand's name day. Rehearsals began in February 1816 and it was performed at the Teatro del Fondo on 30 May 1816. (Note: The Inno for Ferdinand IV was supposed to be performed at the Teatro San Carlo. It was rehearsed there on 13 February 1816, but a fire broke out which subsequently destroyed the theatre.) A few days later, his petition for the professorship was rejected. The Inno was to be Capotorti's last work composed for the theatre. His final opera, Ernesta e Carlino, had premiered the previous year.

After 1816, Capotorti dedicated himself to teaching and to composing sacred music and romanze, many of which were set to texts by Giuseppe Saverio Poli. He spent his final years in San Severo where he was the maestro di cappella at the church of San Lorenzo delle Benedettine but returned to Molfetta from time to time to visit relatives there. He died in San Severo at the age of 75 after being taken ill during his return from the last of those visits. Capotorti had one son from his marriage to Rosa Pollari, Luigi Antonio Capotorti, who also became a musician and composer.

== Later recognition ==
Capotorti's portrait painted by Raffaele Armenise in 1899 was one of four large medallions depicting famous composers from Apulia which decorated the main auditorium of the Teatro Petruzzelli in Bari. The other three composers depicted were Giacomo Tritto, Giacomo Insanguine, and Salvatore Fighera. The medallions and a large ceiling fresco, also painted by Armenise, were lost in 1991 when a fire destroyed the theatre.

In May 2001, the Conservatory of Bari initiated the project "Luigi Capotorti. Un allievo pugliese di Piccinni". There was an exhibition devoted to Capotorti's life and work and a concert in Bari's Chiesa del Gesù which included the first performances in modern times of the Sinfonia from Capotorti's last opera, Ernesta e Carlino and his Sinfonia in B-flat major composed in 1836 for the Feast Day of Saint Anthony. To mark the 250th anniversary of Capotorti's birth in 2017, his native city of Molfetta organized a series of events that included the first public performance of four of Capotorti's hitherto unpublished pieces of sacred music: Nuova Messa per Solennità Festiva, Dio vi salvi, Inno a San Francesco da Paola, and Sestina in onore di Santa Filomena. A CD containing the Nuova Messa per Solennità Festiva and four other vocal and instrumental works was released in 2020. The last of these was Innocente verginella, composed for the Benedictine nuns in San Severo.

There have been three modern critical editions of Capotorti's works:

- The opera Ernesta e Carlino edited by Maria Pia Panunzio and published by the Società di Storia Patria per la Puglia in 1999
- The devotional aria "Innocente verginella" edited by Annamaria Bonsante and published by Il Melograno in 2001
- The cantata Salve Regina (for soprano voice, oboes, horns, and strings) edited by Thomas J. Martino and published by Mannheim Editions in 2012

== Operas and oratorios ==
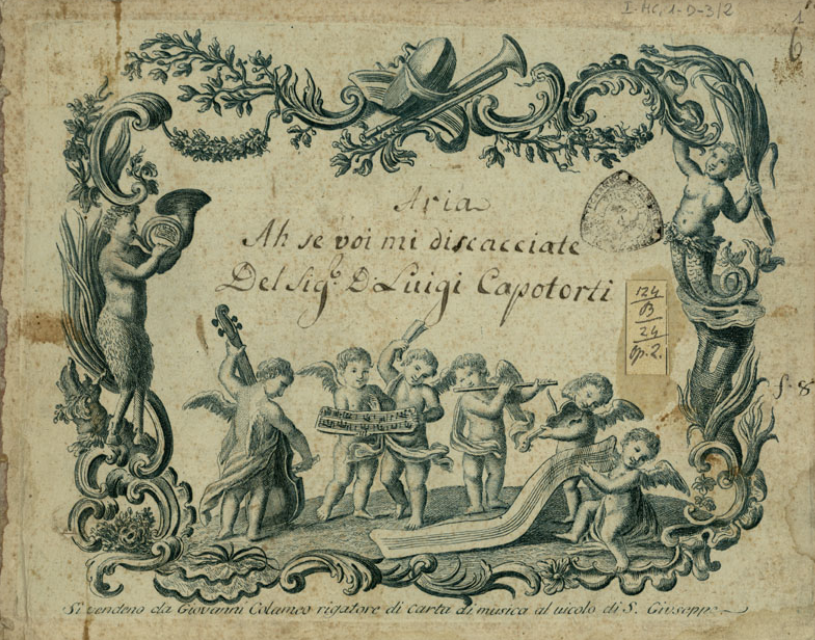
Title page of the score for Capotorti's aria "Ah se voi mi discacciate"

- I sposi in rissa, opera buffa in 2 acts, libretto by Giuseppe Maria Diodati; premiered Naples, Teatro Nuovo, 1796
- Nice, opera seria in 2 acts, librettist unknown; premiered Naples, probably Teatro Nuovo, 1796 (music lost)
- Enea in Cartagine, opera seria in 3 acts, libretto by Giuseppe Maria Orengo; premiered Naples, Teatro San Carlo, 1799
- Gli Orazi e Curiazi, opera seria in 3 acts, libretto by Antonio Simeone Sografi; premiered Naples, Teatro San Carlo, 1800
- Le piaghe d'Egitto, oratorio, libretto by Andrea Leone Tottola; premiered Naples, Teatro del Fondo, 1801
- Le nozze per impegno, opera buffa in 2 acts, libretto by Andrea Leone Tottola; premiered Naples, Teatro dei Fiorentini, 1802
- Obeide ed Atamare, opera seria in 2 acts, libretto by Andrea Leone Tottola; premiered Naples, Teatro San Carlo, 1803
- Ciro, opera seria in 3 acts, libretto by Emmanuele Imbimbo; premiered Naples, Teatro San Carlo, 1805
- Bref il sordo, opera buffa in 2 acts, libretto by Giuseppe Palomba; premiered Naples, Teatro dei Fiorentini, 1805
- Marco Curzio, opera seria in 2 acts, libretto by Giovanni Schmidt; premiered Naples, Teatro San Carlo, 1813
- Ernesta e Carlino, melodramma in 2 acts, libretto by Andrea Leone Tottola; premiered Naples, Teatro dei Fiorentini, 1815
