= Giovine =

Giovine may refer to:

- 16130 Giovine, a main-belt asteroid
- Alfredo Giovine, Italian historian and dialectologist
- Claudia Giovine, Italian tennis player
