= Raffaele Armenise =

Italian painter and scenographer (1852–1925)

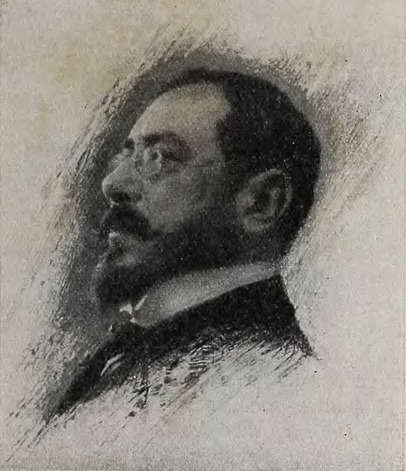
- Born: 19 March 1852; Bari
- Died: 14 January 1925 (aged 72); Malgrate, Milan
- Occupation: Painter

Raffaele Armenise (19 March 1852 – 14 January 1925) was an Italian painter and scenographer, mainly painting history and genre subjects.

== Biography ==
He studied painting initially in his native Bari under Nicolo Zito, then at the Institute of Fine Arts of Naples, where he was influenced by Domenico Morelli and Gennaro Ruo. In 1881, he married the daughter of the painter Borsino di Milan, who owned one of the first color (oleographic) printing establishments in Italy. Armenise moved to Milan by 1880 to work with his father-in-law.

Among Armenise's works are: Dall' Usuraio Ebreo (The Jewish Usurer) bought by the Bank of Naples; Il Vaticano sold in Genoa; Lo scolto troppo caro; La prova del veleno; I Libertini, exhibited at the Exposition of Turin in 1880. In Milan, he painted many miniatures: La Visita a Sua Eminenza acquired by the Museo Revoltella of Trieste; I compari di San Giovanni; La Famiglia del Cieco, and L'Infanzia bought by the Mitchell Museum of New Orleans; and Sua Eminenza in campagna.

In 1899 he completed the decorations of the Teatro Petruzzelli in Bari (destroyed by fire in 1991), including the stage curtain depicting the entry of Orseolo II into Bari after its liberation from Saracens. He worked with the sculptor Pasquale Duretti to complete the large central ceiling fresco of the theatre which depicted the allegories of Music, Dance, and Poetry, and four large medallions depicting famous composers from Puglia—Giacomo Tritto, Luigi Capotorti, Giacomo Insanguine, and Salvatore Fighera—as well as five smaller medallions with a variety of subjects. In Milan, Armenise also worked as an illustrator. He died in 1925 in Milan.

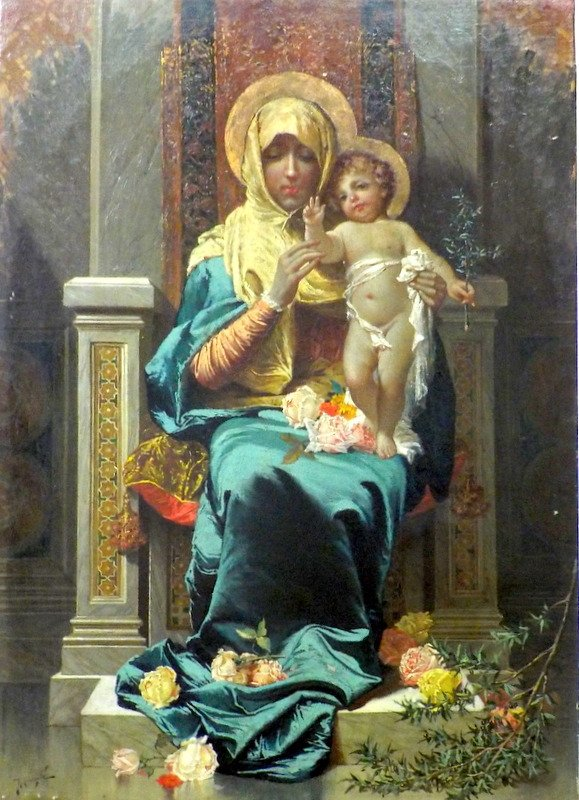
Madonna and Child Blessing (Madonna of the Roses), ca. 1881–1890
