= Transport in Vizianagaram =

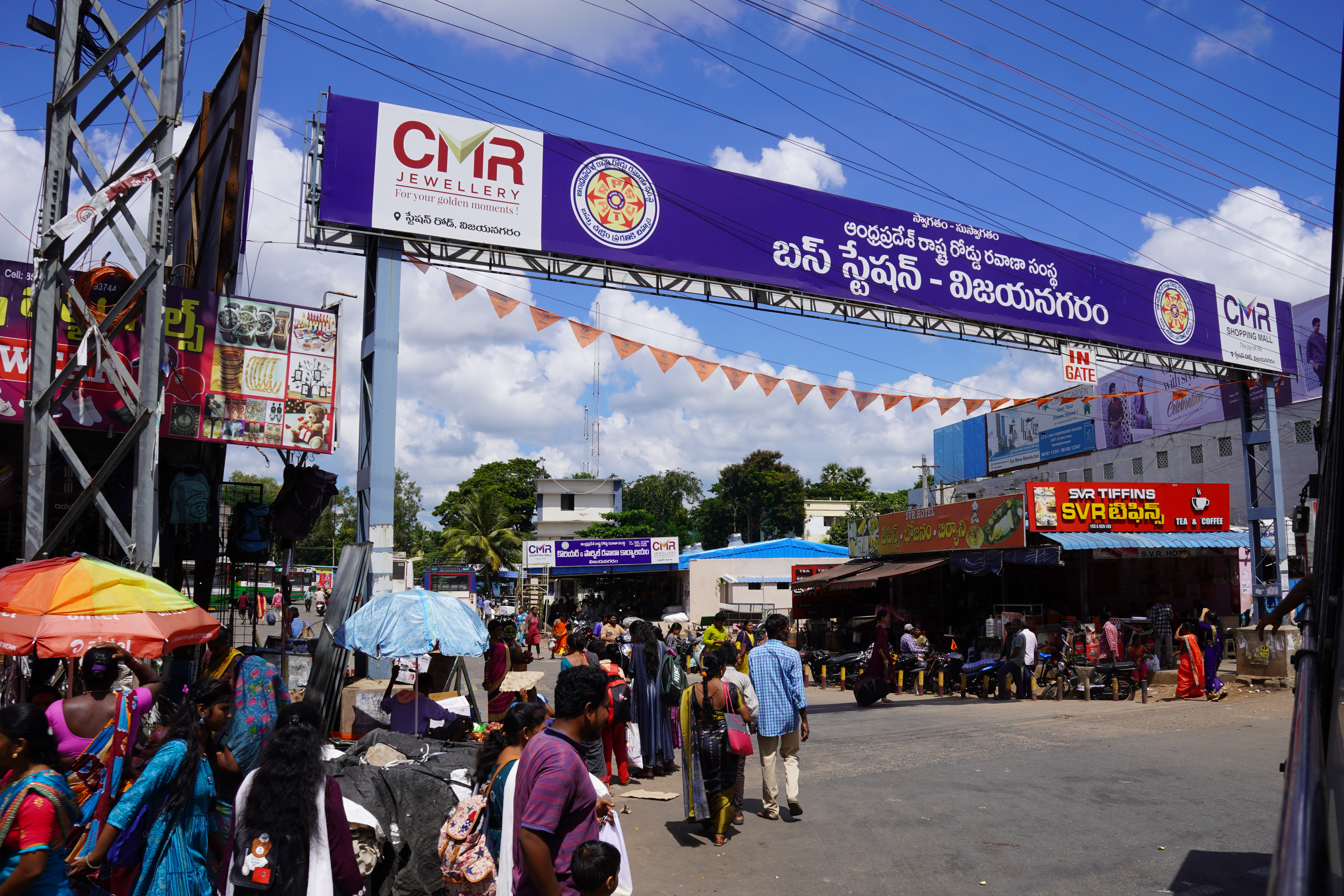
Vizianagaram Bus station entrance

There are various modes of transportation available in Vizianagaram and its Neighbourhoods. It includes auto rickshaws, bicycles to mass transit systems - such as buses, trains and flights.

== Roadways ==
The city has a total road length of 317.90 km. Government is planning to construct a 17-km bypass road with Rs 470 crore to ease the traffic in the town. The road between Mayuri Junction and Balaji Junction, with a length of 1.4 km is being extended into six lane. 20-km stretch NH 26 have been developed to ease traffic flow between Vizianagaram and Visakhapatnam. The city is connected to Visakhapatnam (60 km) via NH 43 & NH 5, to Vijayawada (394 km) via NH 5, to Raipur (526 km) via NH 59, to Hyderabad (664 km) via NH 5 & NH9 and to Chennai (416 km) via NH 5 and AH 45.

== Public Transport ==
=== By Road ===
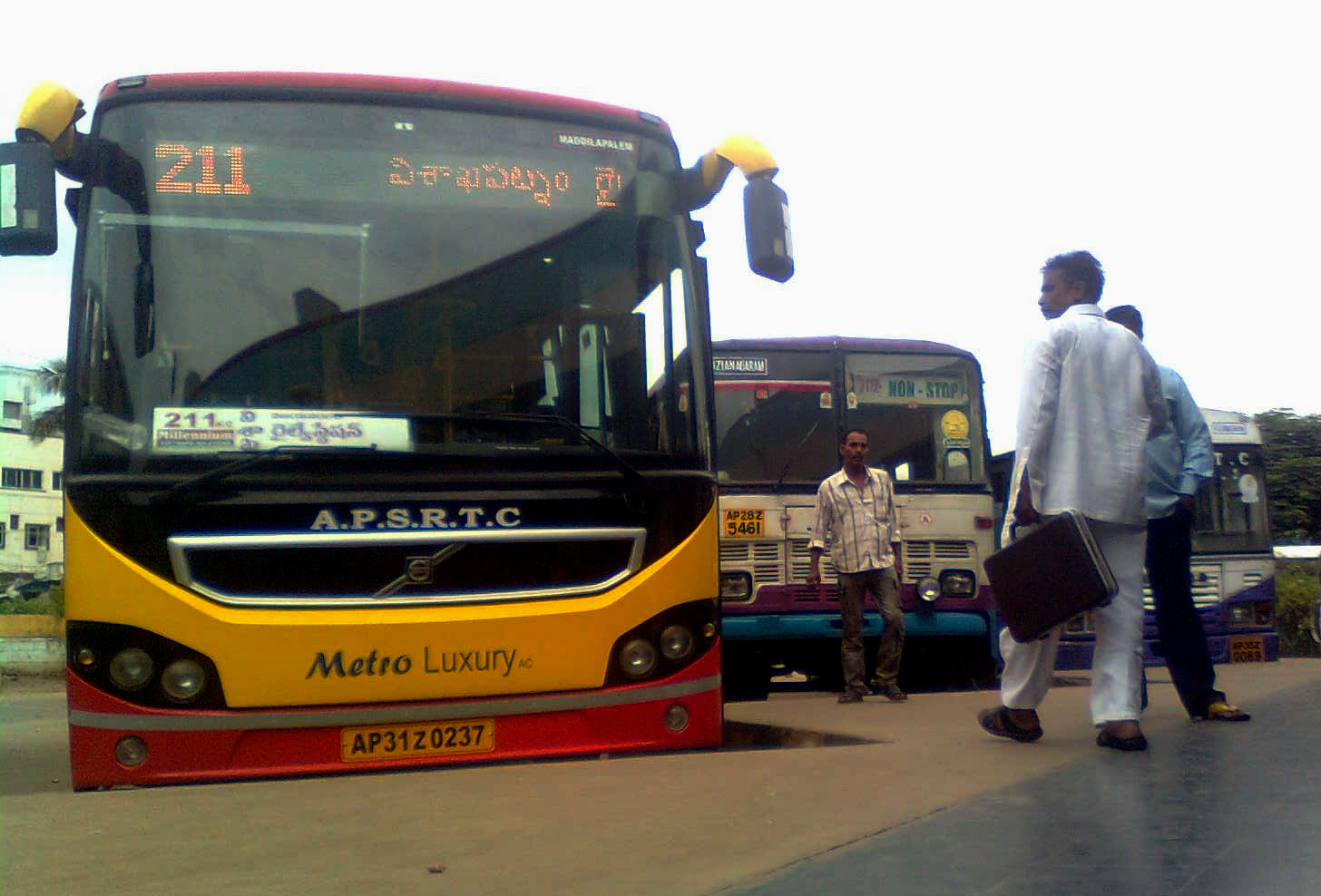
Buses in Bus Station

The Andhra Pradesh State Road Transport Corporation operates bus services from Vizianagaram bus station. Viziagaram zone is one of the 4 zones for APS RTC. Cycling is one of the easiest means of transport in the city and is encouraged by government authorities.

=== Train Transit ===
Vizianagaram railway station is on the Khurda Road-Visakhapatnam section of Howrah-Chennai main line and is the terminus for the Jharsuguda-Vizianagaram line. It has five Platforms. Nellimarla serves as satellite station to the city. It is one of the railway stations that have access to Free Wi-Fi developed by Indian Railways.

=== Airways ===
The nearest airport is in Visakhapatnam located at 62 km. During the 2016-17 fiscal year, Visakhapatnam Airport (IATA: VTZ, ICAO: VOTZ) had served a total of 2,358,029 passengers, an increase of 30.7% from previous year. It handled 19,550 aircraft including 1,421 international and 18,129 domestic.

=== Seaways ===
Visakhapatnam Port is the nearest and one of the 13 major seaports in India. The Visakhapatnam Port Trust plans to develop a satellite port at Bheemunipatnam to decongest traffic at Visakhapatnam. The project is expected to cost ₹2,000 crores and is to be undertaken through a Public- Private Partnership (PPP)venture. After construction, Bheemili will be the nearest port to the city.
