= Giuseppe Picone =

Italian ballet dancer (born 1976)

Giuseppe Picone (born 21 February 1976) is an Italian principal ballet dancer and choreographer. Since 2016, he is the artistic director of the Ballet Company of Teatro di San Carlo in Naples.

== Life ==
Picone was born in Naples, Italy and trained at the Ballet School of the Teatro di San Carlo. At the age of twelve he was chosen by Beppe Menegatti to dance the role of the young Nijinsky in the world première of the ballet Nijinsky, with Carla Fracci and Vladimir Vasiliev He also trained at the Accademia nazionale di danza in Rome and won both competitions of Rieti and Positano.

Under the invitation of Pierre Lacotte at sixteen years old, he joined Ballet National de Nancy as a soloist, and danced in the leading roles of Petruska (M. Fokine), La Sonnambula (G.Balanchine), Paquita (M.Petipa), L' Ombre (P.Lacotte). In 1993 he joined the English National Ballet in London as demi-soloist, where he danced until 1997, and then, at age 21, he was the first male Italian dancer to enter the American Ballet Theatre in New York as a soloist, with his debut in Ben Stevenson's Cinderella.

With Nina Ananiashvili danced the world première of Le Corsaire earning a nomination for the prestigious International Prize Benois pour la Dance. He was invited in Japan at “Nina Ananiashvili and Friends” and at the Gala' "Stars of Ballet 2006".

He is a guest artist of several important ballet companies as Royal Ballet of London, Boston Ballet, Bolshoi Theatre, Teatro dell'Opera di Roma, Vienna State Opera, Het National Ballet of Amsterdam, Los Angeles Dance Theatre, Bucarest National Opera, Ballet National of Cuba, Ballet National de Bordeaux, Ljubljana National Ballet, Teatro di San Carlo in Naples, Arena di Verona, Teatro Massimo, and at International Festival and Galas'.

John Clifford, Director of the Los Angeles Dance Theatre, created the role of Humphrey Bogart in the Dance Musical Casablanca.

Under the invitation of Renato Zanella he was the first Italian to guest at the New Years Concert 2005 live worldwide from Vienna.

In Italy guested in many TV broadcasting including, Festa della Repubbica from Rome, the final night of the famous Festival of Sanremo 2009, Premio Caruso from Sorrento and in 2010 was the leading dancer of the Italian New Years Concert from the Theatre la Fenice of Venice.

In March 2010 he was the only Italian dancer to take part at the New York City Center Theatre Galà Tribute to a dance legend - Vladimir Vassiliev. Andrea Bocelli invited him to his famous annual concert in Lajatico (Italy), with such star as Carreras and Italian Pop Star Zucchero. In December 2010 he recorded in Pisa the Galà Concert of Bocelli "Notte Illuminata".

Since 2004 he has been artistic director of the Gran Gala' (Picone and The Giants of Ballet).

Since 2016, he has been director of the Ballet Company of the Teatro di San Carlo in Naples. As a choreographer he create a new version of Nutcraker and Cinderella, and an acclaimed version of Bolero. Tchaikowsky Classic, Elegie, Carmina Burana and Homage to Verdi, are among other works he has created in the last years. In 2019 at the Arena di Verona for the opera La Traviata by Maestro Franco Zeffirelli, he choreographed the dance scene of "Le zingarelle e Matadores" and it went on air live on the Italian channel Rai1. In May 2023 he was invited by Maestro Jacopo Sipari di Pescasseroli to the Opera House of Tirana to stage his new version of Don Quixote.

== Classical ballet ==
He danced in the leading roles of classical ballet:

Giselle (Deane, Fracci, Jude, Mc Kenzie), Swan Lake (Nurejev, Mc Kenzie, Dowell, Jude), Cinderella (Corder, Stevenson), Romeo and Juliet (Nurejev, Mac Millan, Jude), The Nutcracker (Stevenson, Holmes, Mc Kenzie, Amodio, Deane), La Bayadère (Makarova), Études (Lander), Onegin (Cranko), Gaîté Parisienne (Franklin), Les Patineurs (Ashton), Variation for Four (Dolin), The Sleeping Beauty (Hynd, Mac Millan, Wright), Raymonda (Gacio), Don Quijote (Mc Kenzie), Le Corsaire (Holmes, Khomyakov).

== Neoclassical, Modern and Contemporary dance ==
He was also leading in many roles of neoclassical, modern and contemporary dance repertoire:

Tcajkovsky pas de deux, Square Dance, Who Cares?, The Four Temperaments, Divertissement 15' (Balanchine), Sinfonia (Kylian), Spring and Fall (Neumaier), Gong (Morris), Black Tuesday (Taylor), Known by heart, Push come to shove, Brahms Haydn Variation (T.Tharp), L`Arlesienne (R. Petit), In the Middle, Slingerland pas de deux (W.Forsythe), Symphonic Dance (M. Bigonzetti), Disposition (J.Selya), Homage a' Miles Davis (Miriam Naisy), Te vojo bene assaje, Franca Florio, regina di Palermo (L. Cannito), La Sonnambula (L. Cannito), I have a dream (L. Cannito e M. Merola), The Roman Spring of Mrs Stone (L. Bouy), Bacco e Arianna (F.Franzutti), I due gentiluomini di Verona, David and Apollo e Dafne (S. Giannetti), La Lacrimosa (C. Tanesini), Viderunt Omnes (L. Martorana), Dibbuk, Dream about Japan (A. Ratmansky), Morte di un innocente, Spartacus, Amadeus Mozart, Alles Walzer, Thais (R. Zanella), Aida e Macbeth (G. Iancu) Sahara, Bolero (W. Matteini), Narciso (G.Garofoli), Ave Maria, Sogno (K.Cellini).

== Prizes ==
He was the recipient of Premio Positano in 1997 and 2002, Premio Caserta 1999, Premio Gino Tani, as well as Premio Danza and Danza as Best Dancers in 2002, he danced at Gala' of Dance at Cannes's Festival, with Etoiles of Ballet 2000, as one of Dancers of 2004 and he was the recipient of Premio Anita Bucchi as best male dancer 2005/2006, Premio Asti Danza 2007, International Prize Apulia Arte 2008 and Prize MozArt Box 2008, Prize Gold Ginstra 2010 and received the first Prize Ugo Dell'Ara 2010, which took place in Palermo.
