= Rondo capriccioso =

Rondo capriccioso may refer to:

- Rondo capriccioso (Mendelssohn), by Felix Mendelssohn
- Introduction and Rondo Capriccioso by Camille Saint-Saëns
