= Pietro Sografi =

18th-century Italian surgeon and professor

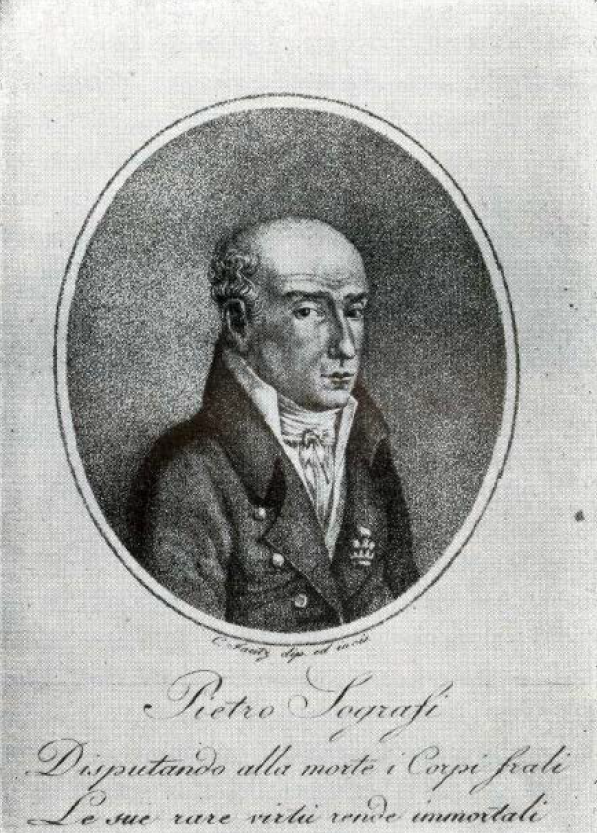
Portrait of Sografi

Pietro Sografi (1756-1815) was an Italian surgeon active in Padua, Italy. He became the professor of obstetrics at the University of Padua.

Born in Padua, he trained with his father, also a doctor. His brother, Antonio Simeone Sografi, was a popular librettist of operas. He was known as a man of great charity, aiding the ailments of both rich and poor. Napoleon honored him with the Insignia of the Crown of Iron.

He wrote the following manuscripts:

- Saggio di riflessioni sopra l'amputazione dei membri (1730, Milan)
- Memoria sopra una singulare osservazione di una pietra formata intorno ad un corpo estranco, introdott nella vescica d'un uomo, ed estratto coll operazione dell'apparato laterale secondo il metodo di M. Le Cat.(1762, Padua)
- Corso elementare dell'arte di raccoglieri i parti (1788, Padua)
- Dialogo drammatico per nozze. (1795, Padua)
