= Edwin Handley =

English cricketer

Edwin Hill Handley (1806 – 2 May 1843) was an English cricketer with amateur status. He was associated with Cambridge University and made his debut in 1827. He was educated at Harrow School and Trinity College, Cambridge. He was admitted to Gray's Inn on 25 December 1828.

In 1833 an item in The Morning Post stated that he was presented to the King by the Marquis of Downshire.

== Family ==
His father was Thomas Handley, a solicitor. Thomas was the solicitor for the family of Mary Hill, Marchioness of Downshire.

In 1833 he married Delphine von Schauroth in Munich. In 1835 they had a son, Charles Frederic William Edwin Hill Handley, born at Lower Wick, Worcester. William Wordsworth was the child's godfather. Edwin and Delphine separated around 1837 and Charles remained in England. Charles died in Clerkenwell in 1840 and is mentioned in Edwin's will of 12 October 1840.

== Death ==
Edwin Hill Handley died in Cadiz, Spain. The executors of his will included Christopher Wordsworth, Headmaster of Harrow School.

== Bibliography ==
- Haygarth, Arthur (1996) [1862]. Scores & Biographies, Volume 1 (1744–1826). Kennington: Frederick Lillywhite. ISBN 978-19-00592-23-9.
- Haygarth, Arthur (1997) [1862]. Scores & Biographies, Volume 2 (1827–1840). Kennington: Frederick Lillywhite. ISBN 978-19-00592-23-9.
