= National Highway 59 (India, old numbering) =

Old numbering of road in India

National Highway 59

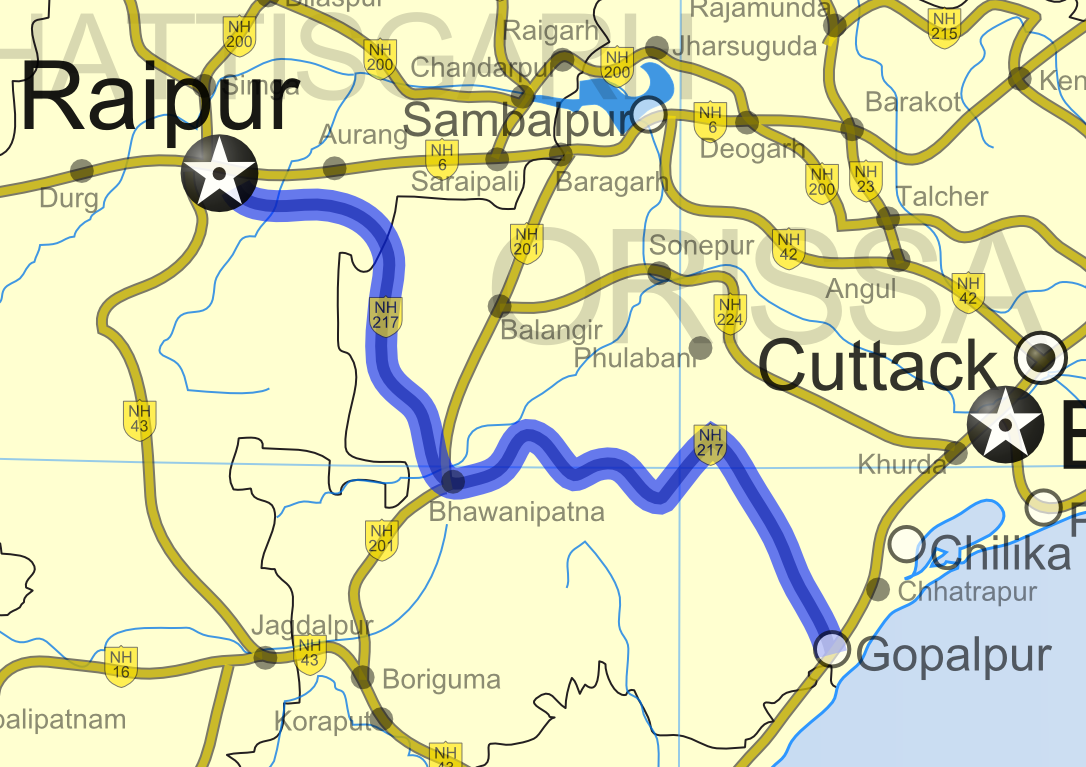
- Road map of India with National Highway 59 highlighted in solid blue color

Route information
- Length: 351.1 km (218.2 mi)

Major junctions
- West end: Khariar, Odisha
- East end: Brahmapur, Odisha

Location
- Country: India
- States: Odisha: 351 km (218 mi)
- Primary destinations: Nuapada, Khariar, Titlagarh, Madanpur Rampur, Baliguda, Surada, Asika, Hinjilicut, Brahmapur, Narendrapur, Odisha, India

Highway system
- Roads in India; Expressways; National; State; Asian
← NH 58	→ NH 60

National Highway 59 (NH 59) is a National Highway in India that connects at last end Jaganathpur in Odisha. It covers a distance of 351.1 km (218.2 mi) of which 351.1 km (218.2 mi) is in Odisha.

== Route ==
=== Odisha ===
- Nuapada
- Khariar
- Titlagarh
- Madanpur Rampur
- Baliguda
- Daringbadi
- Surada
- Dharakote
- Asika
- Hinjilicut
- Brahmapur
- Gopalpur

== See also ==
- List of national highways in India
- National Highways Development Project
