= Antonio Simeone Sografi =

Antonio Simeone Sografi, also known as Antonio Simon, or just Antonio (July 29, 1759 – January 4, 1818), was an Italian librettist and playwright.

After studying and graduating in his home town of Padua, he went to Venice, where he devoted himself to writing comedies and farces, as well as both humorous and serious text for major opera composers of the time. He was an active libretto from 1789 to 1816. It also produced texts for cantatas, oratorios, dramas and sacred compositions. Unlike most of his contemporaries, Sografi called his funny booklets "comedies", rather playful dramas; this because he followed the style of the character comedies of Goldoni and refused the too obvious comedy of art comedies.

He was the brother of the surgeon Pietro Sografi. He died in Padua.

== Libretti for operas ==
- Giovanna d'Arco ossia La pulcella d'Orléans (music by Gaetano Andreozzi, 1789)
- Gli Argonauti in Colco (music by Giuseppe Gazzaniga, 1790)
- La morte di Semiramide (music by Giovanni Battista Borghi, 1791; music by Sebastiano Nasolini, 1792)
- Ercole al Termodonte ossia Ippolita regina delle Amazzoni (music by Sebastiano Nasolini, 1791)
- La morte di Cleopatra (in collaboration with Gaetano Rossi; music by Sebastiano Nasolini, 1791; music by Pietro Alessandro Guglielmi, 1796; music by Gaetano Andreozzi, 1797; music by Gaetano Marinelli, 1800)
- Telemaco in Sicilia (music by Antonio Calegari, 1792)
- Saffo ossia I riti d'Apollo Leucadio (music by Johann Simon Mayr, 1794)
- I bagni d'Abano ossia La forza delle prime impressioni (by Carlo Goldoni; music by Giuseppe Antonio Capuzzi, 1794)
- La principessa filosofa ossia Il contravveleno (after Agustín Moreto; music by Gaetano Andreozzi, 1794)
- Apelle e Campaspe (music by Giacomo Tritto, 1795)
- Gli Orazi ed i Curiazi (music by Domenico Cimarosa, 1796; music by Marcos António Portugal, 1797; music by Luigi Capotorti, 1800)
- La morte di Mitridate (music by Sebastiano Nasolini, 1796; music by Marcos António Portugal, 1806)
- L'amante servitore (music by Ferdinando Paër, 1796)
- Telemaco nell'isola di Calipso (music by Johann Simon Mayr, 1797)
- Alceste (music by Marcos António Portugal, 1798)
- Timoleone (music by Sebastiano Nasolini, 1798)
- Il trionfo di Clelia (music by Sebastiano Nasolini, 1798; music by Marcos António Portugal, 1802)
- Annibale in Capua (music by Antonio Salieri, 1801; music by Giacomo Cordella, 1809)
- Edipo a Colono (music by Nicola Antonio Zingarelli, 1802)
- La vergine del Sole (music by Giuseppe Farinelli, 1805)
- Corradino (music by Francesco Morlacchi, 1808)
- Attila in Aquileja ossia Il trionfo del re dei Franchi (music by Giuseppe Mosca, 1818; music by Giuseppe Persiani, 1827)

== Libretti for cantatas, oratori, and others ==
- Pimmalione (scena drammatica, after Jean-Jacques Rousseau; music by Giovanni Battista Cimador, 1790)
- Eurilla (cantata; music by Sebastiano Nasolini, 1794)
- La distruzione di Gerusalemme (dramma sacro; music by Pietro Alessandro Guglielmi, 1803)
- Inno alla pace (cantata; music by Antonio Calegari, 1809)
- L'omaggio del cuore (componimento drammatico; music by Antonio Calegari, 1815)

== Comedies ==
- Le convenienze teatrali (1794)
- Le inconvenienze teatrali (1800)
