= Gennaro Ruo =

Italian painter (1812–1884)

Gennaro Ruo (1812 - 1884) was an Italian painter, active in Naples, painting both religious-historical subjects, and portraits.

== Biography ==
He studied, and later taught, painting at the Academy of Fine Arts of Naples. He obtained a stipend from the Neapolitan authorities to study in Rome circa 1841. Among his pupils at the academy were Raffaele Armenise, Federico Rossano, and Luigi Medollo.
