= Delphine von Schauroth =

German pianist and composer (1813–1887)

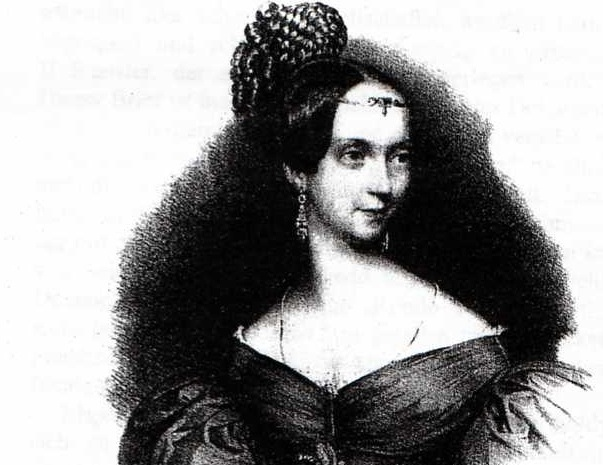
Delphine von Schauroth

Delphine von Schauroth (13 March 1813 – 1887) was a German pianist and composer.

== Biography ==
Delphine von Schauroth was born in Magdeburg, the daughter of Eduard Friedrich Roger Georg von Schauroth (1774–1829) and his second wife (married 10 April 1810) Louise Teltz (1792–1847). She began piano studies at an early age with Friedrich Kalkbrenner in Paris, and in 1822 made her debut in Frankfurt am Main at a concert organized by Karl Friedrich Wilhelm Guhr. This was followed by a European tour the next year, including appearances in Paris and London, and later by additional tours.

When Felix Mendelssohn visited Munich in 1830, he considered marriage with Von Schauroth. It was at her behest that he revised his Rondo capriccioso, Op. 14, which he completed in June of that year. He later wrote to his sister Fanny that she had composed a passage of his Piano Concerto in G minor "that makes a startling effect." However, he never revealed what passage she had written. The concerto premiered in 1831 and Mendelssohn dedicated the work to her.

In 1833, Von Schauroth married Edwin Hill-Handley and moved to London, but continued her concert appearances. In 1837, she separated from her husband and moved back to Munich with her mother. In 1848 she married Stephan, Freiherr Henning von Eberg, but the marriage failed, and in 1856 she married Edward Knight and separated again. In 1870, Von Schauroth joined the General German Music Association as a composer. She died in Munich.

== Works ==
Selected works include:

- Song without Words in E major
- Sonata in A minor
- Sonata in E major
- Sonata brilliant in C minor
- Six Songs without Words, Op 18
- Capriccio in B flat minor
