= Titlagarh =

Titlagarh Titilagarh
- Town, Municipality
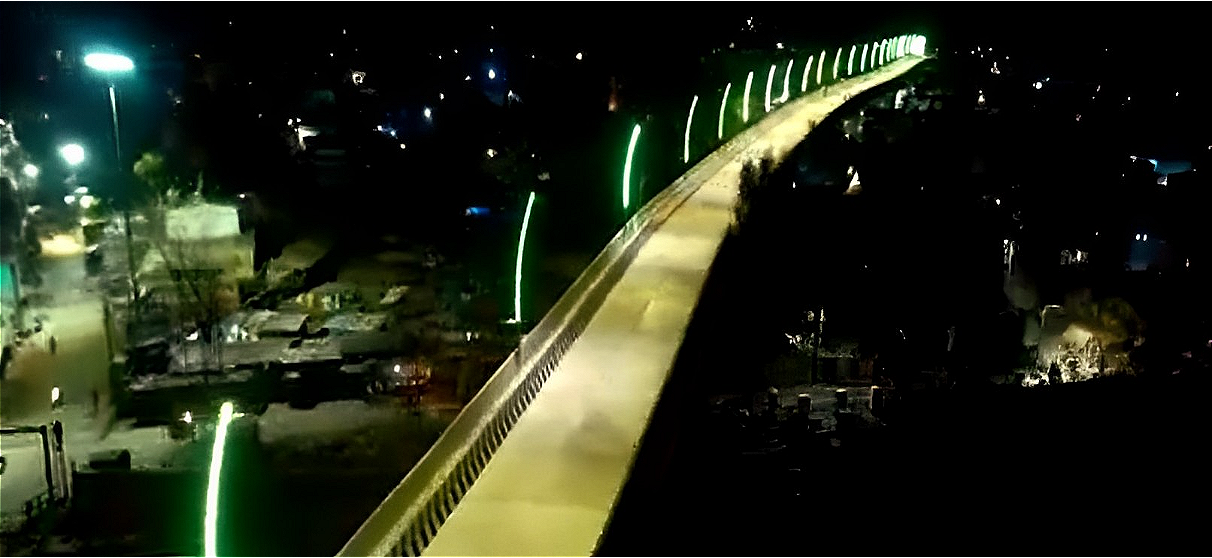

- Location in Odisha, India Titlagarh (India)
- Coordinates: 20.2871°N 83.1466°E
- Country: India
- State: Odisha
- District: Balangir

Government
  - Type: Municipality
  - Sub-Collector: Shri Rehan Khatri (IAS)
  - MLA: Shree Nabin Kumar Jain
  - Municipality Chairperson: Smt. Mamata Devi Jain

Area
  - Total: 15.34 km^{2} (5.92 sq mi)
- Elevation: 215 m (705 ft)

Population (2011)
  - Total: 34,067
  - Density: 2,221/km^{2} (5,750/sq mi)
- Demonym: Titlagadia

Languages
  - Official: Odia
  - Local: Sambalpuri
- Time zone: UTC+5:30 (IST)
- PIN: 767033
- Telephone code: 06655
- Vehicle registration: OD-03
- Coastline: 0 kilometres (0 mi)
- Lok Sabha constituency: Balangir
- Vidhan Sabha constituency: Titilagarh
- Website: titilagarhmunicipality.in

Titlagarh is a Municipality in Balangir district of the Indian state of Odisha. It is a known summer hotspot in India due its extreme heatwaves and was among the top 10 Indian cities with maximum temperature in 2022.

== Geography and Climate ==
Titilagarh is located at 20.3°N 83.15°E. It has an average elevation of 215 metres (705 feet).

Climate data for Titlagarh (1991–2020, extremes 1945–2012)
Month	Jan	Feb	Mar	Apr	May	Jun	Jul	Aug	Sep	Oct	Nov	Dec	Year
Record high °C (°F)	36.1 (97.0)	40.6 (105.1)	46.0 (114.8)	49.6 (121.3)	49.8 (121.6)	50.1 (122.2)	42.6 (108.7)	39.6 (103.3)	39.6 (103.3)	39.6 (103.3)	41.1 (106.0)	37.6 (99.7)	50.1 (122.2)
Mean daily maximum °C (°F)	29.6 (85.3)	33.0 (91.4)	37.6 (99.7)	40.9 (105.6)	42.4 (108.3)	37.4 (99.3)	32.2 (90.0)	31.3 (88.3)	32.8 (91.0)	33.4 (92.1)	31.3 (88.3)	29.0 (84.2)	34.4 (93.9)
Mean daily minimum °C (°F)	13.3 (55.9)	16.5 (61.7)	20.4 (68.7)	23.8 (74.8)	26.4 (79.5)	24.9 (76.8)	22.7 (72.9)	22.8 (73.0)	23.0 (73.4)	21.6 (70.9)	17.6 (63.7)	12.8 (55.0)	20.6 (69.1)
Record low °C (°F)	4.0 (39.2)	4.0 (39.2)	10.0 (50.0)	14.0 (57.2)	15.0 (59.0)	15.0 (59.0)	12.2 (54.0)	11.0 (51.8)	11.8 (53.2)	10.5 (50.9)	7.5 (45.5)	4.5 (40.1)	4.0 (39.2)
Average rainfall mm (inches)	10.2 (0.40)	8.8 (0.35)	15.5 (0.61)	22.4 (0.88)	36.0 (1.42)	198.4 (7.81)	392.1 (15.44)	384.5 (15.14)	229.1 (9.02)	65.5 (2.58)	8.1 (0.32)	2.9 (0.11)	1,373.6 (54.08)
Average rainy days	0.6	1.0	1.4	1.9	2.9	9.0	15.7	15.5	10.6	3.6	0.8	0.3	63.4
Average relative humidity (%) (at 17:30 IST)	56	53	42	39	41	58	76	80	77	71	64	59	60
Source: India Meteorological Department

== Demographics ==
As of 2001 India census, Titilagarh had a population of 27,756. Males constitute 52% of the population and females 48%. Titilagarh has an average literacy rate of 67%, higher than the national average of 59.5%: male literacy is 75%, and female literacy is 57%. In Titilagarh, 12% of the population is under 6 years of age.

== Transport ==
Titilagarh Junction railway station is a junction on the Jharsuguda - Vizianagaram line and Raipur - Vizianagaram line. Through this it is connected to all major cities of India. It was one of the major railway stations in the Sambalpur Railway Division under East Coast Railway Zone.

Titilagarh is near to NH-59 (previously known as NH-217), which runs between Gopalpur in Odisha and Raipur in Chhattisgarh. There is a state highway between Titilagarh and Balangir district via Saintala and between Titilagarh and Bhawanipatana via Sindhekela.

== Notable people ==
- Uday Chand Agarwal - IAS, Ex-Secretary, Dept. of Personnel, Ex, Chief Vigilance Commissioner, Government of India.
- Sam Pitroda - Padma Bhushan awardee, Telecom engineer, inventor and entrepreneur.
- Asit Tripathy - IAS, Chief Secretary, Govt of Odisha.
- Jitendra Mishra - Film maker.
- Om Prakash Agarwal - IAS, served in World Bank (USA).
- Capt. Chandrahas Behera - Indian Army Corps of EME.
- Justice Balkrishna Behera - Judge, High Court (Odisha).
- Dr. Balkishan Agarwal - Medical Specialist, Edinburgh (UK).
- Ritesh Agarwal - CEO of OYO Rooms.
- Humane Sagar - Playback singer.
- Saswat Joshi - Internationally acclaimed Odissi dancer.
