= Risida Kandhapara =

Village in Odisha, India

Risida Kandhapara is a small village in Kalahandi district, Odisha state, India. As of the 2011 Census of India, it had a population of 1,151 across 310 households.
