= Miguel Cicero =

Mexican musician (born 1973)

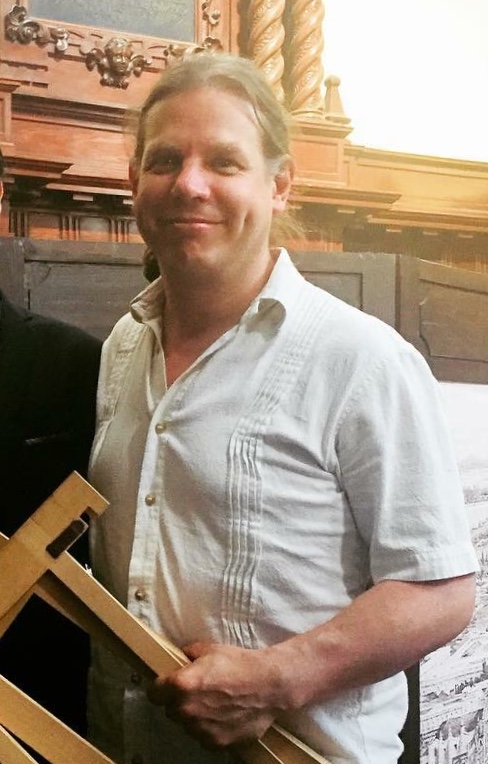

Background information
- Born: Miguel Ángel Cicero; 1973 (age 51–52); Mexico City, Mexico
- Education: National Autonomous University of Mexico; Royal Conservatory of The Hague
- Genres: Baroque, chamber
- Occupation: Musician
- Instruments: Harpsicord, percussion
- Member of: Le Mercure

Miguel Ángel Cicero Olivares (Mexico City, 1973), is a Mexican harpsichordist.

== Career ==
He studied harpsichord with Luisa Durón in Faculty of Music of UNAM.

After he studied at the Royal Conservatory of The Hague under the guidance of Jacques Ogg, he was also a chamber music student of the flutist Wilbert Hazelzet. His other teachers are Richard Egarr and Gustav Leonhardt.

He also attended courses and workshops on historical and traditional percussion with Pedro Estevan, Layne Redmond, Glen Velez, Andrés Flóres Rosas and Francisco Bringas.

He is a member and founder of the baroque quartet ¨Le Mercure¨, with which he has made recordings for Radio Bavaria (Germany), as well as given concerts in Mexico, Poland, Germany and the Netherlands.

It has been presented at the Festival Internacional Cervantino, the International Meeting of Ancient Music and at the International Organ and Chamber Music Festival.

He has played basso continuo with Wieland Kuijken, Carlo Chiarappa (member of the Accademia Bizantina), Los Tonos Humans, 5 Scordatura, Son de Madera and Afrojarocho, among others. He collaborated in the recording of the album "Il Gardelino" by Camerata Aguascalientes. He also participated in the album "Son de mi tierra" of the group "Son de Madera".

Since 2009, he has been a harpsichord and basso continuo teacher as well as an early music workshop at the National Conservatory of Music in Mexico and at the School of Music, UNAM.

He was a beneficiary during the 2000 and 2001 emissions of the Support Program for Study Abroad of the National Fund for Culture and the Arts.
