= Rondo capriccioso (Mendelssohn) =

1830 composition by Felix Mendelssohn

- Rondo by Felix Mendelssohn
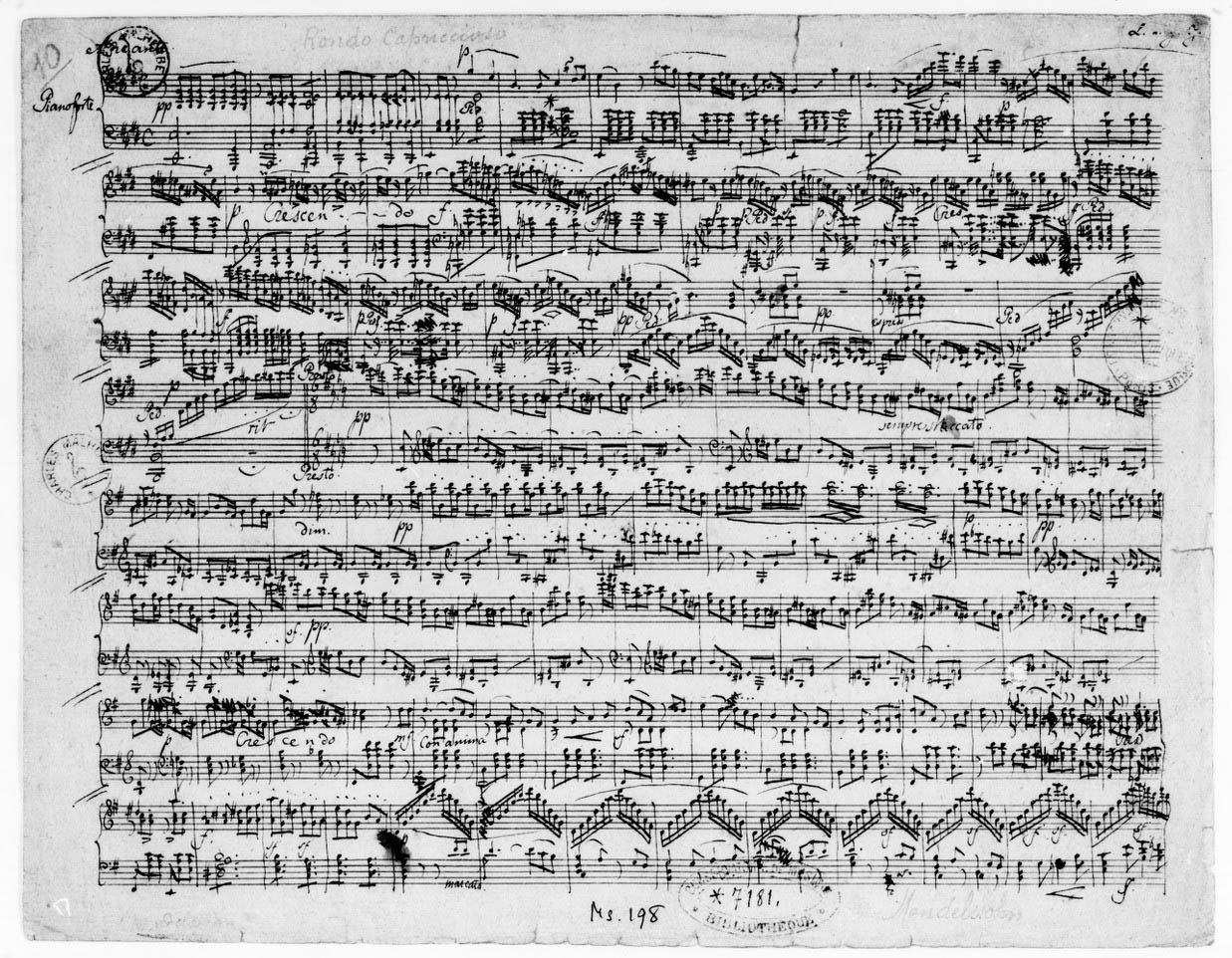
- First page of autograph, dated Munich, 13 June 1830
- Key: E major – E minor
- Catalogue: Op. 14
- Period: Romantic
- Published: 1830: Cramer, Addison & Beale (London); 1831: Mechetti (Vienna); 1831: Richault (Paris)
- Scoring: Piano

The "Rondo capriccioso", Op. 14, MWV U67, is a composition for solo piano by Felix Mendelssohn. The work consists of two linked sections: a lyrical Andante in E major and a virtuosic Presto in E minor.

Mendelssohn originally composed the Presto as a standalone étude in 1828. In 1830, while in Munich, he revised the work for the pianist Delphine von Schauroth, adding the slow introduction to create the form it is known in today. The revised piece was published in 1831 by Pietro Mechetti. The "Rondo capriccioso" is thematically integrated, with the opening melody of the Andante forming the basis for the main theme of the Presto. Its structure, combining a slow introduction with a fast finale, was influenced by the works of Carl Maria von Weber and served as a model for some of Mendelssohn's later compositions for piano and orchestra.

== History ==
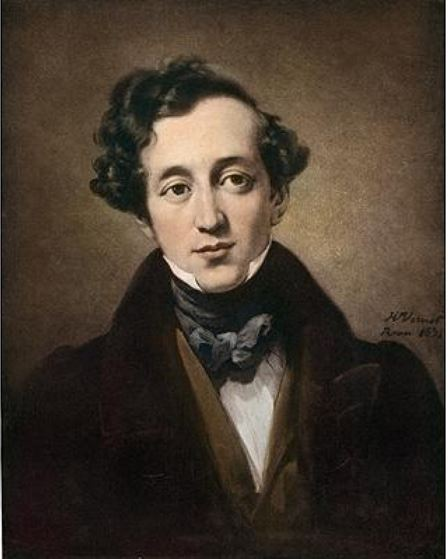
Felix Mendelssohn (1831), by Horace Vernet

The "Rondo capriccioso" was composed during a period when Mendelssohn was reluctant to write for solo piano. In 1825, he confessed to Hans Georg Nägeli that he had "never yet written anything for my instrument alone", and in 1838 he wrote that he composed piano pieces "not with the greatest pleasure". After his three early piano sonatas – the Piano Sonata in G minor (1821), the Piano Sonata in E major, Op. 6 (1826), and the Sonata in B-flat major (1827) — Mendelssohn largely abandoned the sonata form for solo piano. Only Op. 6 was published during his lifetime, while the other two appeared posthumously as Op. 105 and Op. 106. He then explored various alternatives, including fantasy-type works such as the Fantasy on "The Last Rose of Summer", Op. 15 (1827) and the Fantasie in F-sharp minor, Op. 28 (1833), as well as compressed, more sharply profiled forms such as this "Rondo capriccioso" and the Trois Fantaisies ou caprices, Op. 16 (1829).

The "Rondo capriccioso" was first composed on 4 January 1828 as an étude in E minor, which shared only the rondo theme with the later published work. An incomplete autograph of this original version, consisting only of the Presto, survives. This initial version was dedicated to pianist J. Kohlreif, whom the Allgemeine musikalische Zeitung described in 1834 as "a most educated friend of music, and a gifted pianoforte player".

Mendelssohn revised the work two and a half years later in Munich. He explained the reason for the revision in a letter to his sister Fanny on 11 June 1830: "Now I am getting quite busy, and can tell you that I have been paying court to Delphine Schauroth ...; and she has commanded me, under pain of one disgrace or another, to edit the great 6/8 "Rondo Capriccioso" in E minor. So, I have tastily cooked it up with a stirring introductory Adagio, some new melodies and passages, and I have been successful." He completed the revised version two days later. Mendelssohn diligently covered all traces of the recomposition, adding, as he put it, "sauce and mushrooms".

Mendelssohn had first met Delphine von Schauroth in Paris in 1825 when she was twelve years old. By 1830, she had become an "attractive young woman of seventeen, of a noble but impecunious family". Mendelssohn respected her as an excellent pianist – he later dedicated his first Piano Concerto, Op. 25, to her.

The publication process proved difficult. Mendelssohn initially offered the work to Leipzig publisher Friedrich Hofmeister on 28 July 1830, who accepted but then withdrew on 21 August for unknown reasons. Subsequently, Mendelssohn offered the work to Breitkopf & Härtel on 1 September 1830, who agreed to publish on 6 September, but Mendelssohn withdrew due to disagreement over financial conditions. He then negotiated with Vienna publisher Pietro Mechetti, who signed a contract on 17 September 1830 and published the "Rondo capriccioso" in early 1831.

Mendelssohn frequently performed the piece himself, and it quickly became a popular virtuoso show-piece in the piano repertoire.

== Structure ==
Rondo capriccioso
Digital piano capture

The "Rondo capriccioso" consists of a slow introduction (Andante; E major;) linked to a bravura finale (Presto leggiero; E minor; 6/8). When Mendelssohn added the Andante introduction in E major to the original Presto in E minor, he took pains to link it thematically to the Presto: the two principal ideas describe descending forms of the tonic major and minor triads, with several structural pitches embellished by auxiliary tones. He assimilated the characteristic descending fourth of the elfin rondo (E–B) into the lyrical descending phrase of the Andante, so that the rondo seemingly sprang from the slow movement.

The Andante introduction has a nocturne-like character. The device of joining slow and fast movements was likely influenced by Carl Maria von Weber's Konzertstück. The work is not unlike the condensed second and third movements of a concerto. This structure later served as a paradigm for Mendelssohn's Capriccio brillant, Op. 22, and Serenade und Allegro giojoso, Op. 43, both for piano and orchestra.
