= Risida Kumbharpada =

Village in Odisha, India

Risida Kumbharpada is a small village in Kalahandi district, Odisha state, India. As of the 2011 Census of India, it had a population of 1,688 across 428 households.
