= Héctor Ocampo =

Mexican pianist

- Born: Héctor Ocampo-Ruíz; México
- Occupation: Pianist

Héctor Ocampo-Ruíz (México) is a Mexican pianist.

== Career ==
He completed his professional piano studies with the Mexican pianist Raúl de la Mora, and the Cuban pianist Germán Diez in New York, both students of Claudio Arrau. He studied opera singing with Enrique Jaso. He took master classes with Kurt Redel (Musical Interpretation), Jörg Demus, Bernard Flavigny, Mauricio Nader, Philipp Lorenz.

In the city of Chillán, Chile, within the framework of the Commemoration of the 25th Anniversary of the Death of Claudio Arrau. He has participated in various recordings, some financed by Switzerland that include music by Edvard Grieg and Manuel M. Ponce and four other recordings as part of the Mexico City Chamber Orchestra.

Together with the salterist, Atlas Záldivar, they obtained the sponsorship of the National Council for Culture and the Arts (CONACULTA) for the recording of "The Four Seasons" by Antonio Vivaldi, psaltery and piano version.

Currently he teaches at the Higher School of Music, he also gives private classes teaching the formative heritage of the pianist Claudio Arrau.
