= Piano Concerto No. 1 (Mendelssohn) =

1831 musical work

Piano Concerto in G minor
- No. 1
- by Felix Mendelssohn
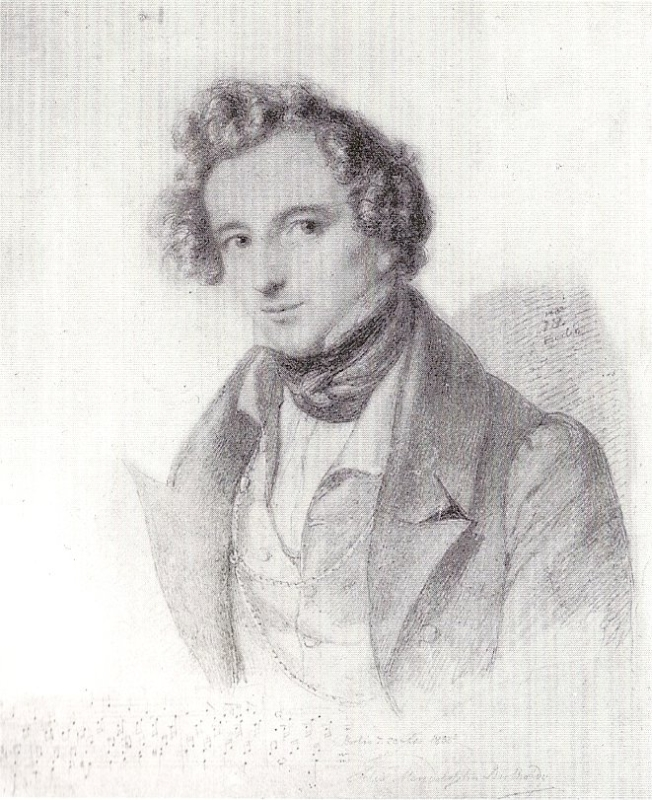
- Drawing of the composer by Eduard Bendemann, 1833
- Key: G minor
- Opus: 25
- Composed: 1830–31
- Performed: 17 October 1831
- Movements: three

I. Molto allegro con fuoco in G minor

II. Andante in E major

III. Presto — Molto allegro e vivace in G major
Performed by Jose Iturbi and the RCA Victor Symphony Orchestra

Mendelssohn's Piano Concerto No. 1 in G minor, Op. 25, was written in 1830–31, and premiered in Munich on 17 October 1831. This concerto was composed in Rome during a travel in Italy after the composer met the pianist Delphine von Schauroth in Munich. The concerto was dedicated to her.

Mendelssohn attended one party after another in Munich in October 1831, the month of the premiere, but he also played chamber music and taught double counterpoint. He performed the piece himself at the premiere, which also included performances of his Symphony No. 1 and the Overture from Midsummer Night's Dream. He had already written a piano concerto in A minor with string accompaniment (1822) and two concertos with two pianos (1823–24).

== Structure ==
The three connected movements use several relatively new formal techniques in their brief span — for example, the piano enters very soon after the opening of the first movement, with little of an orchestral tutti to contrast with.

1. Molto allegro con fuoco in G minor
2. Andante in E major
3. Presto — Molto allegro e vivace in G major

The concerto quickly obtained popularity, and contains many sections of improvisation, one of Mendelssohn's specialities. It is scored for two flutes, two oboes, two clarinets, two bassoons, two horns, two trumpets, timpani, and strings.

=== I. Molto allegro con fuoco ===
The piano enters after only a few bars of orchestral introduction. It was standard procedure in the classical-era concerto to precede the solo's entrance by a tutti, for various reasons – the length and purpose of these introductions differed, some offering a hint of what was to follow and some giving out almost all the movement's material, but none was so brief as this: in this sense, this was one of the first concertos of the Romantic age. (The obvious exceptions – Mozart's ninth and Beethoven's fourth and fifth piano concertos – allowed the piano to enter very briefly just at the start, but then proceeded as usual, the soloist silent.)

The rest of the movement is fairly typical of concertos in its use of a modified sonata form, with a second, contrasting lyrical theme first heard from the piano over repeated accompaniment, and later on wind. As the movement closes a transition takes the movement not to a full close, but instead, with a brass fanfare and a piano continuation of the same, to the border of the Andante.

=== II. Andante ===
This opens with a melody in the lower strings, in E major, soon taken up by the piano. This is drawn out with breadth, and a middle section in B provides contrast. The original melody, somewhat varied, returns to close the movement.

=== III. Presto — Molto allegro e vivace ===
This opens with a fanfare in A minor (Presto). The piano joins in, at which point the mood lightens, and the closing rondo - Molto allegro e vivace - begins. This is regular in form, and the returns of the refrain are varied. Several themes from the first movement return towards the finale.

== Reception ==
Though Mendelssohn said of the concerto "I wrote it in but a few days and almost carelessly", the concerto was extremely popular—partially due to the efforts of Clara Schumann and Franz Liszt. Hector Berlioz described what happened to an Érard piano on which the concerto was too often played:

...the piano, which is out of its mind, has no intention of paying him any heed either. He sends for holy water and sprinkles the keyboard with it, but in vain—proof that it wasn't witchcraft but merely the natural result of thirty performances of one concerto. They take the keyboard out of the instrument—the keys are still moving up and down by themselves—and they throw it into the middle of the courtyard next to the warehouse. There M. Erard, now in a fury, has it chopped up with an axe. You think that did it? it made matters worse. Each piece danced, jumped, frisked about separately—on the pavement, between our legs, against the wall, in all directions, until the warehouse locksmith picked up this bedeviled mechanism in one armful and flung it in the fire of his forge, finally putting an end of it...Such a fine instrument!

== Recordings ==
Commercial recordings include:

- 1959: Rudolf Serkin with the Philadelphia Orchestra conducted by Eugene Ormandy
- 1986: András Schiff with the Bavarian Radio Symphony Orchestra conducted by Charles Dutoit
- 1990: Murray Perahia with the Academy of St. Martin in the Fields conducted by Neville Marriner
- 1997: Stephen Hough with the City of Birmingham Symphony Orchestra conducted by Lawrence Foster
- 2003: Lang Lang with the Chicago Symphony Orchestra conducted by Daniel Barenboim
- 2008: Bella Davidovich with the Moscow Chamber Orchestra conducted by Constantine Orbelian
- 2009: Yuja Wang with the Verbier Festival Orchestra conducted by Kurt Masur
- 2016: Ronald Brautigam with the Kölner Akademie conducted by Michael Alexander Willens
- 2018: Jan Lisiecki with the Orpheus Chamber Orchestra
