= Mazurkas, Op. 6 (Chopin) =

1832 composition by Frédéric Chopin

The Mazurkas, Op. 6 are Frédéric Chopin's first set of mazurkas published during his lifetime. They were composed in 1830–1831 and were published in 1832. The set was dedicated to Countess Pauline Plater.

== Pieces ==
=== No. 1 in F♯ minor ===
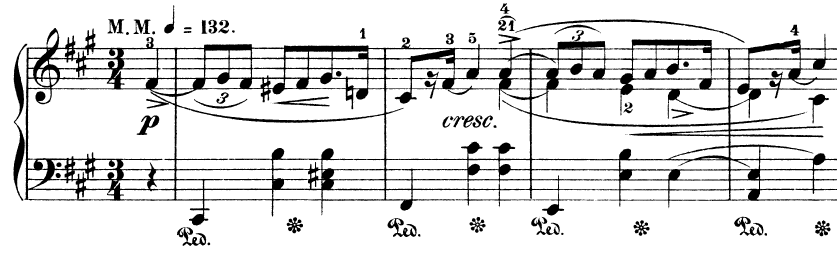
Incipit of No. 1

The first mazurka of the set is a lively piece that makes use of Polish folk rhythms and modes. The main theme, a hallmark of Chopin's unique piano voice, revolves around triplets and brings heavy accents on the third beat of each bar. It is quite melancholic, yet elegant in character. A second theme, marked fortissimo, offers a passage full of sforzandos and wedge accents. The original theme then returns, forte, but quickly decrescendos. These passages end with repeats. The third theme enters as an ostinato under a thundering accompaniment with a grace note before every chord. After several percussive chords, the central theme returns and the mazurka gradually dies away. It takes around two and a half minutes to perform.

=== No. 2 in C♯ minor ===
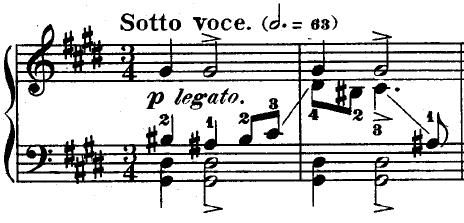
Incipit of No. 2

The second mazurka of the set, in C♯ minor, is quite an outwardly dance-like piece, with a triple meter and bass line characteristic of a waltz. It starts with a slow introduction characterised by a murmuring inner voice. The principal theme, lyrical and almost melancholy in character, is repeated in slightly altered form. The second theme makes use of the Lydian mode. The trio provides a contrast with a more joyous theme. This then quickly fades with a Da capo to the introduction and the mazurka ends after the main theme is repeated twice. It lasts around two and a half minutes.

=== No. 3 in E major ===
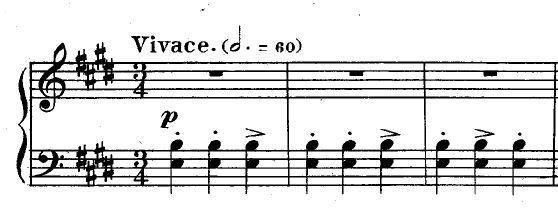
Incipit of No. 3

The third mazurka of the set, in E major and marked Vivace, is the only mazurka of the set in a major key and features a patriotic and joyful theme with accents on the third beat. The second theme alternates between chordal forte passages and lyrical ones. This quickly transitions to a third theme, which is characteristic of a kujawiak and more gentle than the previous two themes. The main theme then returns for the final time and the mazurka fades gracefully. Overall, the piece is very animated and has a rhythmic drive that is quite rustic in feeling. It lasts around two minutes.

=== No. 4 in E♭ minor ===
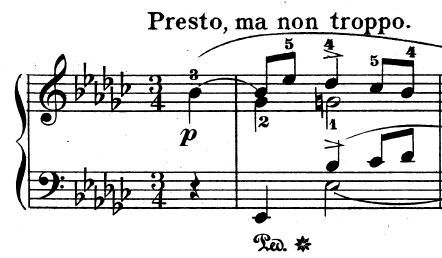
Incipit of No. 4

The final mazurka, in E♭ minor, is the shortest one of the set and involves a recurring, spinning melody that has a nostalgic quality. It is marked Presto and takes under a minute to perform.
