= Alfredo Giovine =

- Born: 2 April 1907; Bari, Italy
- Died: 25 August 1995 (aged 88); Bari, Italy
- Occupations: Historian; Dialectologist; Journalist

Alfredo Giovine (2 April 1907 – 25 August 1995) was an Italian historian, folklorist, dialectologist, and journalist. He wrote several books and many monographs on the musicians and theatres of the Province of Bari and the surrounding Region of Puglia as well as on the dialect and folklore of Bari, his native city.

== Life and career ==
Born in Bari, Giovine studied singing from 1920 to 1925 under Cesare Franco, who was the maestro di cappella of the Basilica di San Nicola. He initially had a shipping firm, but had to give it up in 1955 due to a physical disability. Over the next forty years, he worked as a journalist and carried out extensive research and writing on the musicians and theatres of the Province of Bari as well as on the dialect and folklore of the province. In 1960, he founded the Archivio delle Tradizioni Popolari Baresi (Archive of Bari's Popular Traditions). The Archive also has a section called "Civiltà Musicale Pugliese" (Musical Culture of Puglia), which is devoted to documenting and promulgating some of the lesser-known aspects of the musicians and music of Bari and the surrounding Region of Puglia.

During the 1980s, Giovine began a collaboration with the Bari-based publishing house Editori Laterza. Laterza republished many of his earlier works, including: Pulpe rizze, (Note: "Pulpe rizze" ("curly octopus") is a Bari delicacy consisting of raw octopus limbs which have been beaten until tender and become curled in the process.) a book of Giovine's poetry written in the Bari dialect and accompanied by Italian translations; Il Teatro Petruzzelli di Bari, a detailed history of the Teatro Petruzzelli; and Bari la zita mè, (Note: The book takes its title from "BBare du core mì, tu sì la zita mè" (Bari of my heart, you are my bride"), a line in Giovine's poem A BBare.) a pictorial history of the city.

Giovine died in Bari in 1995 at the age of 88. His last book, Bari in carrozza, a collection of vignettes depicting life in Bari in the first half of the 20th century, was published by Schena Editore four months after his death. In 2005, the 10th anniversary of his death, Laterza published Giovine's Il dialetto di Bari, a grammatical guide to reading and writing in the Bari dialect which eliminates some of the previously used diacritics and non-Italian letters. Giovine had been working on it since 1968. It was completed and edited for publication by his son, Felice Giovine, who founded the Centro Studi Baresi in 1985 and was the founding editor of U Corrìire de BBàre, a monthly newspaper written in the Bari dialect.

In 2000, the city of Bari renamed the street which runs along its southern waterfront "Via Alfredo Giovine".
