= Giovanni Masutto =

Giovanni Masutto (30 July 1830 – 30 January 1894) was an Italian musicologist, flautist, conductor and music professor. Born in Treviso, he was the founder of the Istituto Musicale Trevigiano in Treviso and the director of the Scuola Popolare di Musica in Venice. His books include La Musica, della sua origine e della sua storia (1877), I maestri di musica italiani del secolo XIX (1882) and Della musica sacra in Italia (1889). He died in Venice survived by his son Renzo Masutto (1858–1926), who became a composer and concert pianist.
