= Teatro Petruzzelli =

Opera house in Bari, Italy

Coordinates: 41.123542°N 16.872774°E

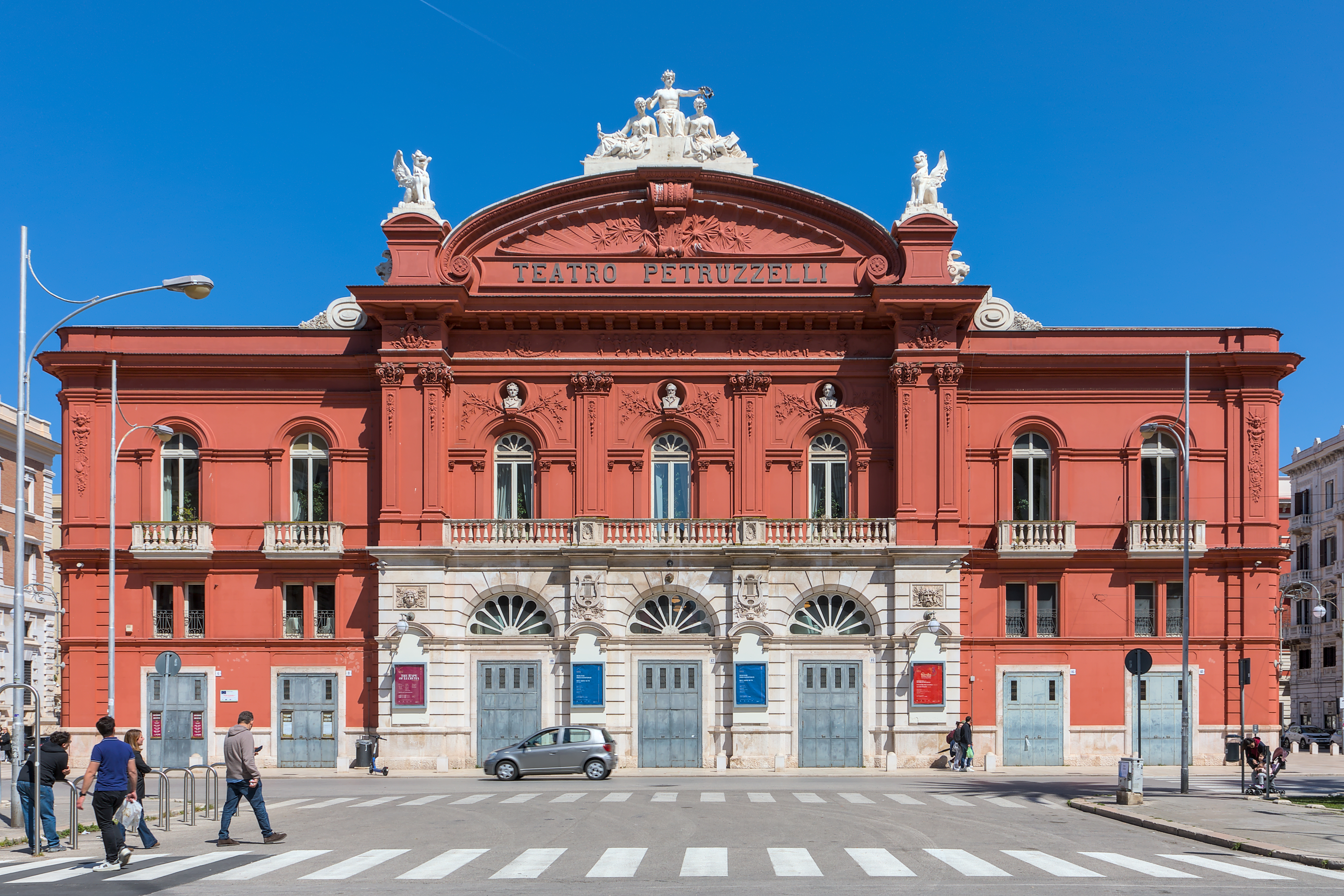
Teatro Petruzzelli

The Teatro Petruzzelli is the largest theatre of the city of Bari and the fourth Italian theatre by size.

== History ==
=== Origin and golden age ===
The history of the Teatro Petruzzelli of Bari begins when Onofrio and Antonio Petruzzelli, traders and ship builders from Bari, presented the designs for the theatre drawn up by their brother-in-law, the engineer Angelo Bari Cicciomessere (then Messeni) to the city of Bari. The proposal for building the Petruzzelli was accepted and, on 29 January 1896, a contract was signed between the family and the city administration. Two years later, in October 1898, work began and it ended in 1903.

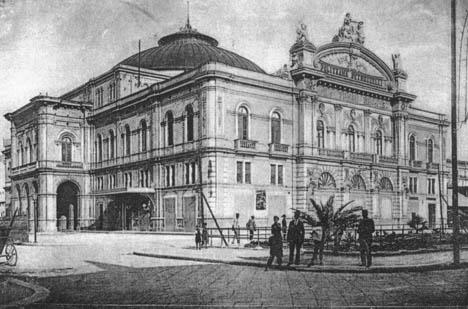
Teatro Petruzzelli shortly after its completion

The interior of the theatre was painted by Raffaele Armenise. On completion the Teatro Petruzzelli overtook the Teatro Comunale of Corato as the largest theatre of Apulia. The theatre was inaugurated on Saturday, 14 February 1903 with Meyerbeer's Les Huguenots.

In the 1980s, the theatre hosted two major operatic debuts, that of Iphigénie en Tauride by Niccolò Piccinni which had never been presented after its debut in Paris in 1779, and the Neapolitan version of Bellini's I Puritani, which was written for Maria Malibran but was never performed by her. Both events contributed to making the city world-famous.

In addition to operas, ballets and big concerts were presented. Many great international artists have performed at the Petruzzelli: these include Tito Schipa, Herbert von Karajan, Rudolf Nureyev, Frank Sinatra, Ray Charles, Liza Minnelli, Juliette Gréco. Great Italian artists include Eduardo De Filippo, Riccardo Muti, Carla Fracci, Luciano Pavarotti, Piero Cappuccilli and Giorgio Gaber.

The Petruzzelli also hosted important concerts of light music (among others concerts by Paolo Conte and Ornella Vanoni) and it was the headquarters of Azzurro, a musical programme, for almost all of the 1980s. The interior was also used as a location for films such as Il giovane Toscanini by Franco Zeffirelli and Polvere di stelle by Alberto Sordi.

=== Destruction and reconstruction ===
During the night of 26 and 27 October 1991 the theatre was completely destroyed by fire, the result of arson. The last opera presented was Norma.

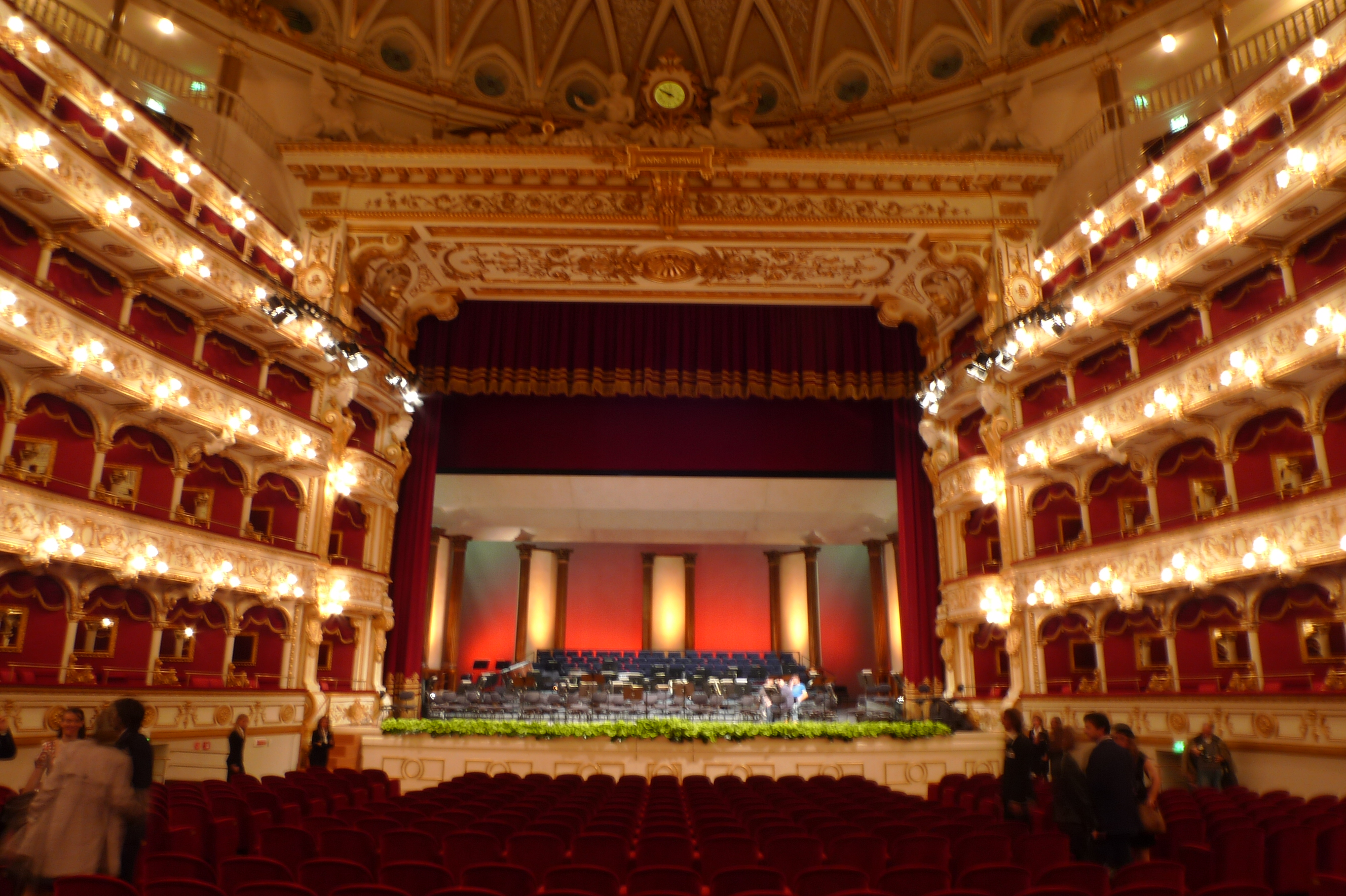
Inside the rebuilt theatre

The criminal trial of those accused of setting the fire ended with the acquittal of the defendants and the condemnation of the perpetrators of the incident.

A civil action followed which involved the Messeni Nemagna family and temporary manager Fernando Pinto, who was accused of failing to insure the theatre, ended with his conviction and the order to pay compensation of 57 billion lire in favour of the owners of the theatre. On 21 November 2002 the Ministry for Heritage and Cultural Activities signed a "Protocol of Understanding" between the family that owned the theatre and the City, the Province of Bari and the Apulia Region, stating that the theatre would be rebuilt by 22 November 2006.

However, since the work of reconstruction never started, on 3 October 2006 the Theatre become the property of the Municipality of Bari in accordance with an Article related to the Finance Act of 2006. But on 30 April 2008 the Constitutional Court, in its decision No. 128/2008 ordered that the Theatre be given back to the Messeni Nemagna family.

The Petruzzelli, reconstructed entirely with public money in 2008, was returned to the City of Bari on 7 September 2009 for breach of article 5 of the contract dated 29 January 1896 between the City of Bari and Antonio Onofrio and Petruzzelli. The article stated: "In the event that the building collapses because of an earthquake, fire or for any other cause, the grantee and its successors would have the right to rebuild the Politeama to its original state, provided that the work was undertaken within a year and be completed in three years from the date on which the collapse has occurred, or have a duty to clear the land and leave it free of debris and return it to the City within a year counting from the above term."

The Fondazione Lirico Sinfonica Petruzzelli e Teatri di Bari was eventually identified as the only entity able to assume the management, maintenance and insurance of the Teatro Petruzzelli, based on what was written in former Article 23 of Law 800, which states that municipalities must make theatres available for opera companies after the end of concert seasons. The Teatro Petruzzelli officially reopened Sunday 4 October 2009, nearly 18 years after the fire, with a performance of the Ninth Symphony by Ludwig van Beethoven by the Orchestra of the Province of Bari, conducted by Fabio Mastrangelo.

On 6 December 2009 the first opera season in the re-built theatre began with Turandot by Giacomo Puccini, directed by Roberto De Simone, with the orchestra conducted by Renato Palumbo.

== See also ==
- Teatro Margherita
- Teatro Piccinni
