= Carla Fracci =

Italian ballet dancer and actress (1936–2021)

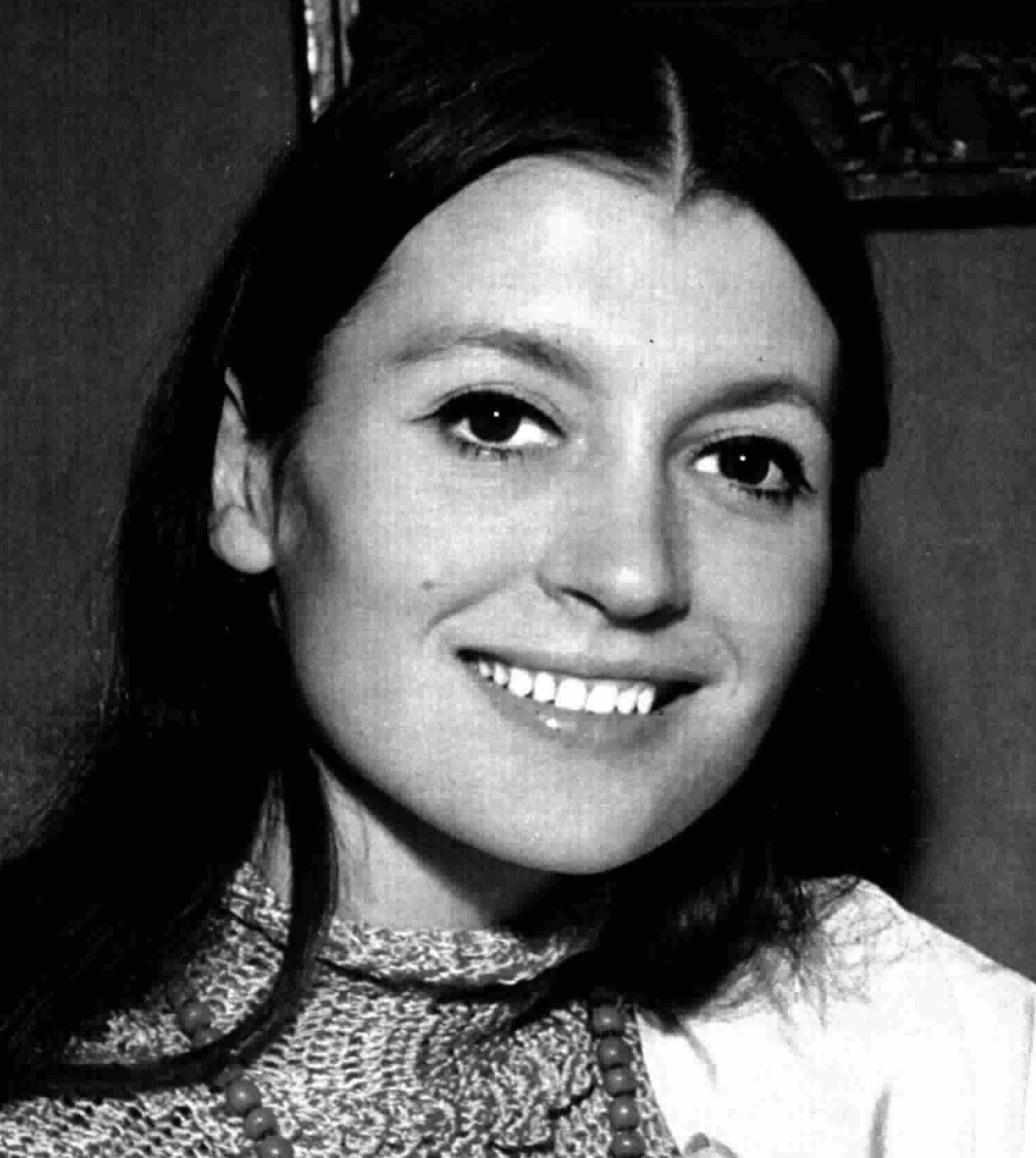
- Fracci in 1969
- Born: Carolina Fracci; 20 August 1936; Milan, Kingdom of Italy
- Died: 27 May 2021 (aged 84); Milan, Italy
- Resting place: Cimitero Monumentale di Milano, Milan, Italy
- Occupations: Ballet dancer; Actress; Ballet director
- Organizations: La Scala Theatre Ballet; Teatro San Carlo; Verona Arena ballet; Teatro dell'Opera di Roma ballet
- Spouse: Beppe Menegatti (m. 1964)
- Children: 1 son

Carolina "Carla" Fracci (Italian: [ˈkarla ˈfrattʃi]; 20 August 1936 – 27 May 2021) was an Italian prima ballerina, actress and ballet director. Considered one of the greatest ballerinas of the 20th century, she was a leading dancer of La Scala Theatre Ballet in Milan, then worked freelance with international companies including the Royal Ballet, London, Stuttgart Ballet, Royal Swedish Ballet and American Ballet Theatre. Fracci is known for her interpretation of leading characters in several Romantic ballets, such as La Sylphide, Giselle, Swan Lake, and Romeo and Juliet. She also performed in ballets such as Nijinsky and Complete Bell Telephone Hour Performances: Erik Bruhn 1961–1967. She danced with partners including Erik Bruhn, Rudolf Nureyev and Mikhail Baryshnikov. Later, she directed several ballet companies in Italy, including the Teatro San Carlo in Naples and the Teatro dell'Opera di Roma in Rome.

According to Bruhn, she "gave the world a new idea of the ballerina in 19th-century Romantic ballets". She appeared with many of the leading companies of the world, and received multiple honours for her performances.

== Early life ==
Born as Carolina, Fracci was born on 20 August 1936, in Milan, to a tram driver and a mother who worked at a factory. During the Second World War, she lived with relatives in the countryside. In 1946, her mother brought her and her sister to a La Scala Theatre Ballet School entrance exam, which ended up being disastrous for Fracci. While her body type was deemed unsuitable for ballet, she was pretty enough to be the last of 35 students accepted. She described the early days at the school as "a crashing bore and a terrible chore." However, after she was cast as the mandolin in The Sleeping Beauty, performing alongside Margot Fonteyn, she changed her mind about ballet training and "started working very hard to catch up for the lost time." Fracci's training completed in 1955. She was one of six students chosen to participate in passo d'addio, a farewell performance of the graduates held after an opera performance.

== Career ==
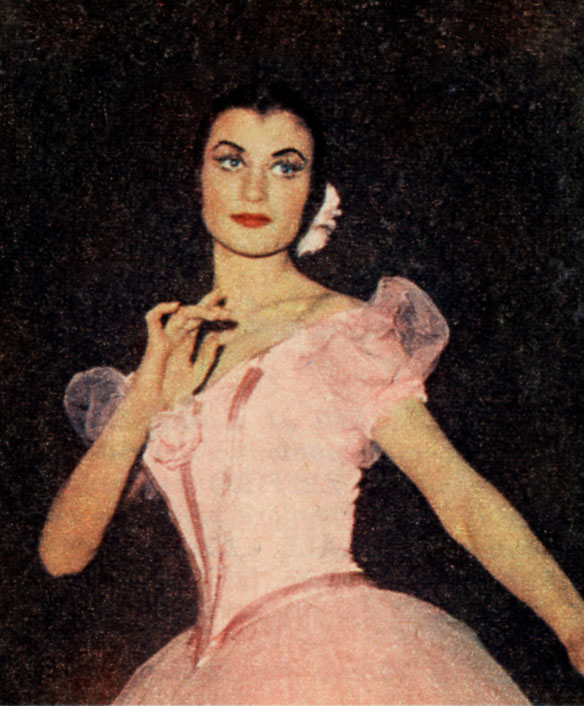
Fracci in 1957

Fracci entered La Scala Theatre Ballet after she graduated, and was promoted to soloist the following year. Her breakthrough came when she filled in for Violette Verdy in Rodrigues' Cinderella in 1958, which led to her promotion to principal dancer, and further to her dancing the title role in Giselle with the London Festival Ballet the following year. In 1963, she left the company as she felt underpaid and underemployed. Instead, she pursued a freelance career.

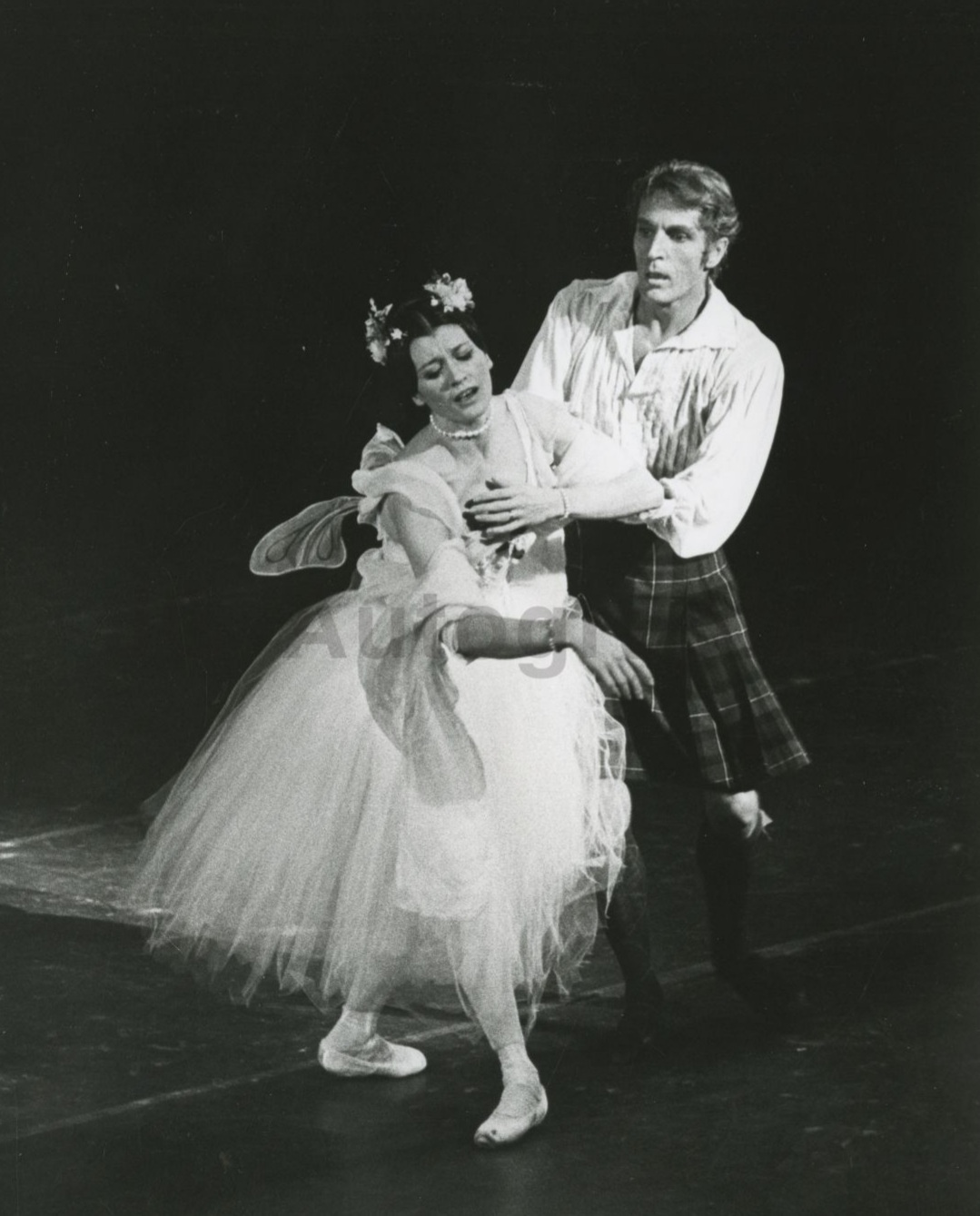
Fracci at her prime in La Sylphide with Erik Bruhn.

Fracci performed with partners including Mikhail Baryshnikov, Roberto Bolle, Erik Bruhn, Alexander Godunov, Henning Kronstam, Gheorghe Iancu, Rudolf Nureyev, Giuseppe Picone and Vladimir Vasiliev. She appeared with leading companies of the world, including the Royal Ballet in London, the Stuttgart Ballet, the Royal Swedish Ballet in Stockholm and the American Ballet Theatre.

Starting in the late 1980s, she directed numerous major ballet companies in Italy: first was the ballet company of the Teatro San Carlo in Naples. From 1996 to 1997, she directed the Verona Arena ballet. From November 2000, she directed the Teatro dell'Opera di Roma ballet, where she continued until 2010. There she followed the Opera's traditional repertoire, as well as Diaghilev's works for the Ballets Russes. The repertoire at the Rome Opera's ballet ranged from Millicent Hodson's adaptation of The Rite of Spring to Andris Liepa's versions of Scheherazade, Petrushka and The Firebird. She was instrumental in bringing ballet to the people, such as an open-air performance in Paestum, and appearing in public squares and schools.

From June 2009 to 2014, she was nominated Culture Assessor for the Metropolitan City of Florence.

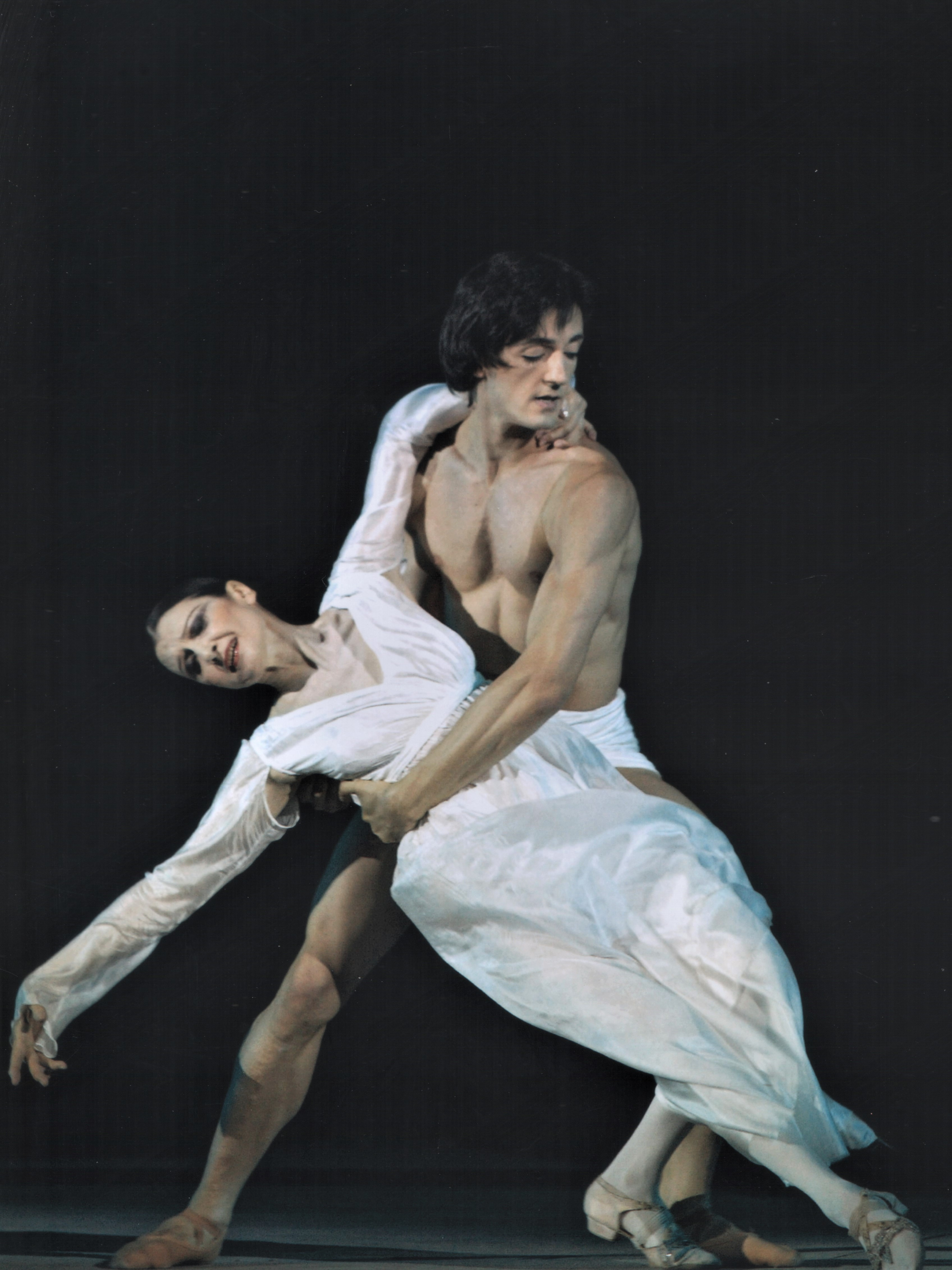
Fracci still dancing at 70 with Fabio Grossi (dancer).

In 1983, 2000, and 2003, Fracci was awarded three prestigious honors from the Italian Government, acknowledging her achievements. On 16 October 2004, Fracci was named Goodwill Ambassador of the Food and Agriculture Organization (FAO), a specialized agency of the United Nations that leads international efforts to defeat hunger. Fracci's autobiography Steps after Steps was published in 2013. In 2014, she took part in a documentary film, 29200 Puthod, l'altra verità della realtà, directed by Federico Angi, about the life of the painter Dolores Puthod.

On 20 December 2016, she presented the book Ballerina by the author Roberto Baiocchi, published by the Giunti publishing house in Florence, for which she signed the preface.

== Personal life ==
In 1964, Fracci married theatre director Beppe Menegatti; the couple had a son, Francesco. After she retired, they lived near Florence.

Fracci died from cancer on 27 May 2021 in Milan, at the age of 84. Her remains are entombed in a crypt at the Famedio in the Cimitero Monumentale di Milano, the first woman to be so honored. In accordance with her wishes, cemetery workers were photographed in the act of sealing her tomb, with Menegatti explaining that "without the technicians, there would be no show".

== Filmography ==
Source: Carla Fracci at IMDb

Year	Title	Role	Director	Notes
1980	Nijinsky	Tamara Karsavina	Herbert Ross	Feature film debut as an actress
1981	The Lady of the Camellias	Marguerite Gauthier	Mauro Bolognini	Nastro d'Argento – Best Breakout Actress
1982	The Life of Verdi	Giuseppina Strepponi	Renato Castellani	Miniseries; co-lead role (9 episodes)
1982	Venezia, carnevale, un amore	The Lady	Mario Lanfranchi	
1988	William Tell	Solo dancer	Riccardo Muti	Filmed stage performance
2021	Carla	Herself	Emanuele Imbucci	Television film about her life (posthumous release)
