= Beppe Menegatti =

Italian theatre director (1929–2024)

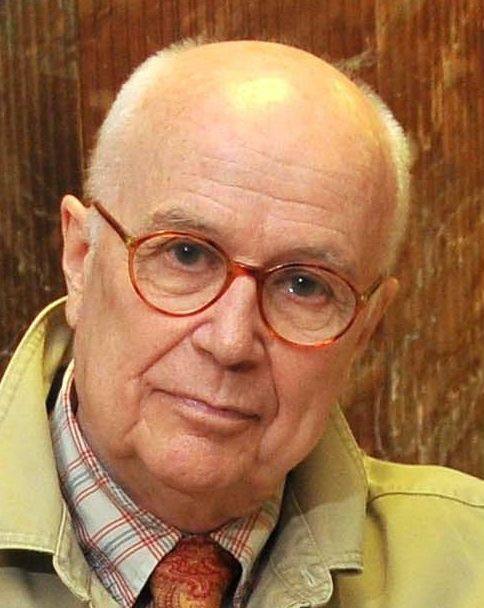
- Menegatti in 2010
- Born: 6 September 1929; Florence, Italy
- Died: 17 September 2024 (aged 95); Rome, Italy
- Occupation: Theatre director
- Spouse: Carla Fracci (m. 1964; died 2021)
- Children: 1 son

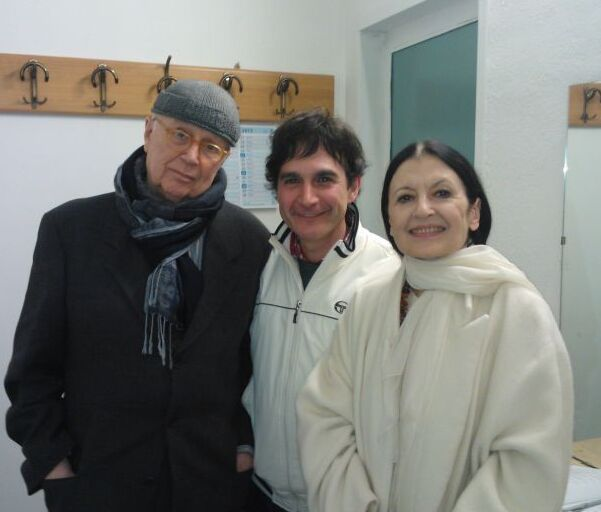
Carla Fracci with her husband and director Beppe Menegatti, and the dancer and choreographer Roberto Baiocchi, 2014

Giuseppe Menegatti (6 September 1929 – 17 September 2024) was an Italian theatre director. He is best known for directing productions with his wife, ballerina Carla Fracci, but also directed first performances in Italian of plays by Beckett and Babel.

== Life and career ==
Giuseppe Menegatti was born in Florence on 6 September 1929. He attended performances of the Maggio Musicale Fiorentino as a young boy; he remembered that he received a ticket for Verdi's Rigoletto for his tenth birthday, in a performance with the young Giulietta Simionato as Maddalena. He developed a passion for opera. The Silvio D'Amico National Academy in Rome awarded him a scholarship. In the mid-1950s he was called by Luchino Visconti as assistant director. He collaborated during his career with Eduardo De Filippo, Vittorio De Sica, Giorgio Strehler and Franco Zeffirelli.

He directed operas, ballets and plays by important authors, including, in 1964, the Italian premieres of Samuel Beckett's All That Fall and Play and that of Isaac Babel's Maria, with actors including Paola Borboni, Lydia Alfonsi and Virginio Gazzolo. He directed almost all shows of his wife, ballerina Carla Fracci. He showed her versatility in dramatic ballets, some based on plays including The Macbeths in 1969, The Seagull in 1970, Mirandolina in 1983 and Mourning Becomes Electra in 1995, based on opera such as The Sicilian Vespers in 1992, and some based on historic biographies such as Nijinsky: Memories of Youth in 1989, Alma Mahler G. W. in 1994, and Zelda, Save Me a Waltz in 1998. He assisted his wife in managing the ballet of the Arena di Verona in 1996/97.

Menegatti authored productions that combined dance, spoken language and song. He directed for television, such as The Ballerinas, a ballet-drama in two parts in which Peter Ustinov and Fracci played roles in scenes from the history of ballet. He recreated ballets whose choreography had been lost, especially in the 2000s when he and his wife managed the Rome Opera Ballet, for example Ballets Russes ballets such as The Red Poppy.

== Personal life ==
Menegatti married Carla Fracci in 1964; they had a son, Francesco, born in 1969. She died on 27 May 2021. After her death he moved to Rome where their son lived.

Menegatti died in Rome on 17 September 2024, at the age of 95.
