= Madanpur Rampur =

- Town
- Location within Odisha Location within India
- Coordinates: 20°11′43″N 83°31′06″E
- Country: India
- State: Odisha
- District: Kalahandi

Government
  - Block Development Officer: Uttam Bag, [OAS]

Population (2011)
  - Total: 80,524
- Time zone: UTC+05:30 (IST)
- Pincode: 766102
- Telephone code: 06676
- Literacy: 87.40 %

Madanpur Rampur or M. Rampur is one of the towns in Bhawanipatna sub-division in Kalahandi District in Odisha State. This town is maintaining 55 km distance from its District main city Bhawanipatna and 410 km far from its State capital Bhubaneswar.

== Geographical position ==
In 1852 when the British entered Kharonde (Kalahandi) by that time Kharonde was in two parts. One part was known as Kharonde Dependency (from Junagarh to Asurgarh, Narla) and another was Mudunpoor Kharonde6 (Madanpur Kharonda from Narla to river Tel in the North of Kalahandi). Madanpur-Kharonda was independent in nature, the land of temples, forts and rivers. The rivers were highway by that time for trade and communication7. As per Global Positioning System (GPS) Madanpur-Rampur is situated at the altitude of 1136 ft from the sea level to the North-0190.45.942, East-0830.10.002. Kalahandi was a portion of Tri–Kalinga which had extended from Godavari in the south to river Tel and Toshala in the north along the eastern border of Kalinga and the western border of Dahalas and south Koshala.
