= Jacopo Sipari di Pescasseroli =

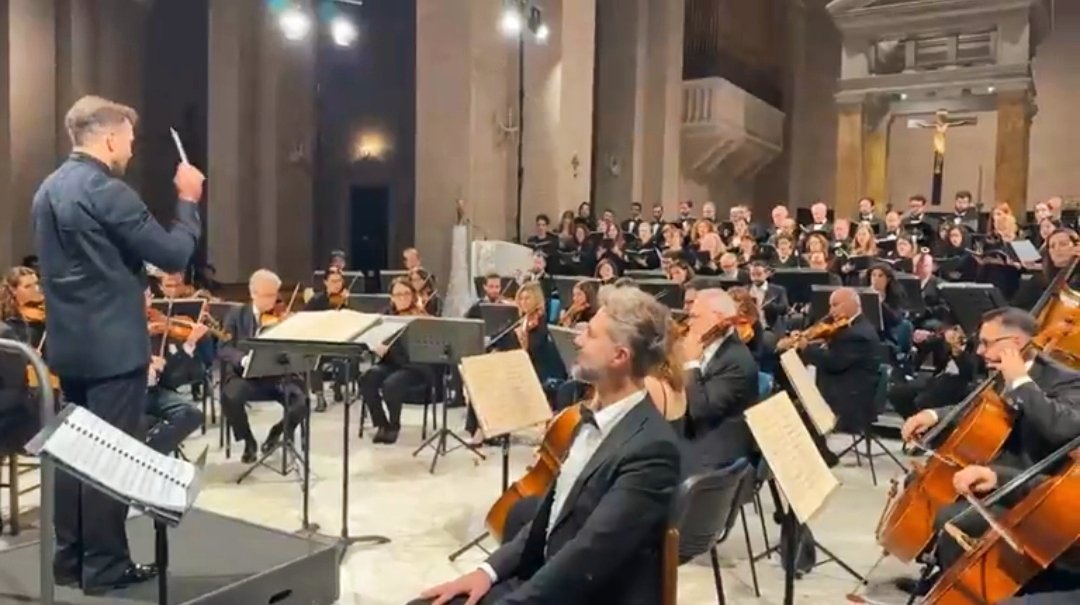
- Jacopo Sipari di Pescasseroli
- Born: 5 November 1985 (age 41); L'Aquila, Italy
- Education: Alfredo Casella Conservatory in L'Aquila, Giuseppe Tartini Conservatory
- Occupations: Conductor, Musical Director, Lawyer
- Parent: Antonello Sipari

Jacopo Sipari di Pescasseroli (5 November 1985) is an Italian conductor and lawyer. He serves as the artistic director of the National Opera and Ballet Theater of Tirana and the International Festival di Mezza Estate, as well as the music director of the Abruzzo Symphony Institution. Additionally, he is the principal guest conductor of the National Opera and Ballet Theater in Varna, Bulgaria.

== Biography ==
Jacopo Sipari di Pescasseroli was born in L'Aquila, Abruzzo, in 1985. He earned two degrees with high honors: one in Jurisprudence and another in Canon Law. He later obtained two doctorates, one in Criminal Law and another in Canon Law with a specialization in Latin. Simultaneously, he studied experimental composition under Mauro Cardi and opera singing with Maria Chiara Pavone at the Alfredo Casella Conservatory in L'Aquila. He then continued his studies at the Giuseppe Tartini Conservatory in Trieste, graduating with top marks and honors in orchestral conducting under Marco Angius, as well as in choral composition and conducting.

In 2014, at the age of 29, he was elected a member of the Tiber Academy in Rome and earned the title of rotal lawyer. Since 2016, he has served as the artistic director of the Sacrum International Festival. The following year, he became the artistic director of the Festival di Mezza Estate, an international festival in Tagliacozzo.

In 2020, he received the special recognition Golden Opera for the New Generation at the Lyric Oscars. In 2022, he was appointed chief conductor of the Opera Theater in Varna, Bulgaria. Since 2023, he has served as the artistic director of the National Theater of Opera, Ballet, and Popular Ensemble of Tirana, as well as the musical director of the Abruzzo Symphony Institution.

He has been a guest conductor several times at the Festival Puccini in Torre del Lago. In 2016, he conducted La Bohème and later Turandot for its 90th anniversary. In 2018, he led Il Trittico for its 100th anniversary, and in 2024, he conducted Madama Butterfly for its 120th anniversary. That same year, he embarked on a world tour dedicated to the works of Giacomo Puccini.

Sipari di Pescasseroli has conducted hundreds of opera productions worldwide, including Norma (Bellini); Il Barbiere di Siviglia and La Cenerentola (Rossini); La Bohème, Turandot, Il Tabarro, Suor Angelica, Gianni Schicchi, Madama Butterfly, Le Villi, and Tosca (Puccini); Rigoletto, Nabucco, Aida, La Forza del Destino, Otello, Il Trovatore, La Traviata, Attila, Macbeth, and Don Carlos (Verdi); Andrea Chénier (Giordano); Don Giovanni and Le Nozze di Figaro (Mozart); Pagliacci (Leoncavallo); Cavalleria Rusticana (Mascagni); Lucia di Lammermoor (Donizetti); and Carmen (Bizet).

He has also conducted numerous ballets, including Giselle, Swan Lake, Don Quixote, The Sleeping Beauty, Romeo and Juliet, Carmina Burana, and The Rite of Spring. In addition to symphonic and operatic productions, he has worked with film music and collaborated with internationally renowned artists such as Ermonela Jaho, Anna Pirozzi, Krassimira Stoyanova, Nino Machaidze, Vincenzo Costanzo, Francesco Meli, Charles Castronovo, Saimir Pirgu, Amadi Lagha, Amarilli Nizza, José Cura, Valeria Sepe, Dimitra Theodossiou, Roberto Scandiuzzi, Kamen Chanev, Kiril Manolov, Gëzim Myshketa, Anna Maria Chiuri, Donata D'Annunzio Lombardi, and Fiorenza Cedolins.

In the realm of popular music, he has conducted concerts for international stars such as Ricky Martin, Il Volo, Anastacia, and Amii Stewart. He was a guest conductor at the National Theater of Opera and Ballet in Belgrade from 2017 to 2019. In 2017, he debuted with the Qatar Philharmonic Orchestra (QPO), followed by the Israel Symphony Orchestra in 2019 and the Saarland State Orchestra (das Saarländische Staatsorchester) in 2021. Since 2019, he has served as the artistic and musical director of the OperaViva International Lyric Opera Festival at the Opera and Ballet Theater in Baku, Azerbaijan.

In 2021, he made his debut at the Athens Megaron with the Athens State Orchestra, and in 2023, he conducted at the Gewandhaus in Leipzig with the Leipzig Symphony Orchestra. He is currently a professor of orchestral training at the Giuseppe Martucci Conservatory in Salerno.

== Personal life ==
Jacopo Sipari di Pescasseroli is the son of children's literature writer Antonello Sipari (1954, Avezzano – 2019, L'Aquila).

== Discography ==
=== 2010 ===
- Opfer und Verführer – Das Schicksal der Kastraten – Il Giardino Armonico / C. Bartoli (ZDF)

=== 2016 ===
- Anastacia and Jacopo – Symphony Orchestra "Marco Dall'Aquila" / Anastacia (IacoFilm)

=== 2017 ===
- Puccini: Turandot – Orchestra and Choir of the Puccini Festival Foundation / R. Lokar, R. Park, F. Cappelletti (Paramax Film)

=== 2018 ===
- Tchaikovsky: Symphony No. 5 – Symphony Orchestra of Abruzzo (Telepace)

=== 2019 ===
- Galanti: Via Crucis – Orchestra and Choir of Cilea Theater, Reggio Calabria / S. Orfila, F. R. Tiddi, S. Intagliata, S. Janelidze, D. Ruberti (Telepace)
- Mozart: Concerto for Clarinet and Orchestra, K. 622 – Radio Television Orchestra of Serbia / Vojislav Dukić (clarinet) (RTS Production)
- Before the First: La Bohème – Europa Musica Orchestra (Rai 5)
- Mr. Puccini by Cinzia Tedesco – Puccini Festival Foundation Orchestra / C. Tedesco, P. Iodice, J. Girotto, A. Salis (Sony Classical)

=== 2020 ===
- Mozart: Requiem – Abruzzo Symphony Orchestra and International Opera Choir / Donata D'Annunzio Lombardi, A. Chiuri, W. Ganci, D. Gazale (IacoFilm)
- Beethoven: Choral Fantasy – Abruzzo Symphony Orchestra and International Opera Choir / Michele Campanella (IacoFilm)

=== 2022 ===
- Mozart: Solemn Vespers of the Confessor – Abruzzo Symphony Orchestra and International Opera Choir / Ripalta Bufo, Francesca di Sauro, Lorenzo Martelli, Sergio Bologna (IacoFilm)
- Mozart: Coronation Mass – Abruzzo Symphony Orchestra and International Opera Choir / Ripalta Bufo, Francesca di Sauro, Lorenzo Martelli, Sergio Bologna (IacoFilm)
- Rachmaninoff: Piano Concerto No. 2 – Orchestra of the National Opera Theatre of Tirana / Giuseppe Albanese (piano) (RTSH Albania)
- Shostakovich: Symphony No. 5 – Orchestra of the National Opera House of Tirana (RTSH Albania)

=== 2023 ===
- Verdi: Requiem – Choir and Orchestra of the National Opera Theatre of Tirana / Eva Golemi, Ivana Hoxa, Raffaele Abete, Vittorio de Campo (RTSH Albania)
- Rossini: Petite Messe Solennelle – Abruzzo Symphony Orchestra and International Opera Choir / Donata D'Annunzio Lombardi, Irene Molinari, Dario di Vietri, Gaetano Triscari (IacoFilm)

=== 2024 ===
- Fauré: Requiem – Abruzzo Symphony Orchestra and International Opera Choir / Donata D'Annunzio Lombardi, Armando Likaj (IacoFilm)
- Bartolucci: Stabat Mater – Abruzzo Symphony Orchestra and International Opera Choir / Maria Tomassi (IacoFilm)
