= Giacomo Insanguine =

Italian composer, organist, and music educator

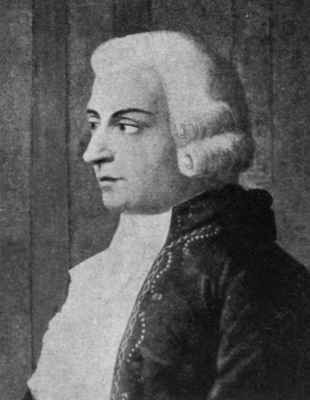
Giacomo Insanguine portrait

Giacomo Antonio Francesco Paolo Michele Insanguine (also called Giacomo Monopoli after his birthplace Monopoli; 22 March 1728 – 1 February 1795) was an Italian composer, organist, and music educator. He was the last director (primo maestro) of the conservatoire of Sant'Onofrio in Naples, which merged in 1795, two years after Insanguine's death in Naples, with the conservatoire of Santa Maria di Loreto. The most important and up-to-date critical study on him was recently published in an Anthology of unpublished eighteenth-century music in Puglia.

== Biography ==
On August 23, 1767, he became a teacher at the Conservatory of Sant'Onofrio. In the winter of 1768, he conducted the comic opera L'osteria di Marechiaro, which was a great success. On January 20, 1770, he performed La Didone abbandonata, an opera previously commissioned from Baldassarre Galuppi, at the Teatro San Carlo.
