= Dentice =

Dentice was a Neapolitan musical family. Members included:

- Luigi Dentice (c. 1510 – 1566), composer, musical theorist, singer and lutenist
- Fabrizio Dentice (1539 – c. 1581), composer and virtuoso lute and viol player, son of Luigi
- Scipione Dentice (1560–1633), keyboard composer, grandson of Luigi and nephew of Fabrizio

== See also ==
- House of Dentice
