= Ernesto Dentice di Frasso =

Italian politician

Ernesto Dentice 7th Prince of Frasso
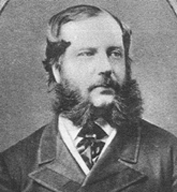

Senator of the Kingdom of Italy
- In office 6 June 1876 – 23 October 1886

Member of the Parliament of the Kingdom of Italy
- In office 5 December 1870 – 20 September 1874

Personal details
- Born: 10 October 1825; Naples, Kingdom of the Two Sicilies
- Died: 23 October 1886 (aged 61); Livorno, Kingdom of Italy
- Spouse: Luisa Chotek von Chotkowa und Wognin (died 1886)
- Parent(s): Luigi Dentice di Frasso; Anna Maria Serra

Ernesto Dentice, 7th Prince of Frasso (10 October 1825 – 23 October 1886) was an Italian politician.

== Early life ==
Ernesto Dentice di Frasso was born in Naples on 10 October 1825 into an aristocratic family of the Kingdom of the Two Sicilies. He was the son of Luigi Dentice, 6th Prince of Frasso (1791–1850) and Donna Anna Maria Serra (1802–1868). His sisters were Donna Ippolita Emanuela Dentice di Frasso (who married the Bavarian diplomat and politician Count Count Otto von Bray-Steinburg), and Donna Maria Dentice di Frasso (who married Ferdinando Capece Minutolo, 1st Marquis of Bugnano).

His paternal grandparents were Gerardo Dentice, 4th Prince of Frasso and Ippolita di Tocco Cantelmo Stuart (a daughter of Prince Restaino di Tocco Cantelmo Stuart of Montemiletto). His maternal grandparents were Pasquale Serra and Maria Antonia Serra, 7th Princess of Gerace, Duchess of Terranova.

== Career ==
From 5 December 1870 to 20 September 1874, he was a Member of the Parliament of the Kingdom of Italy. From 6 June 1876 to 23 October 1886, he served in the Senate of the Kingdom of Italy.

== Personal life ==
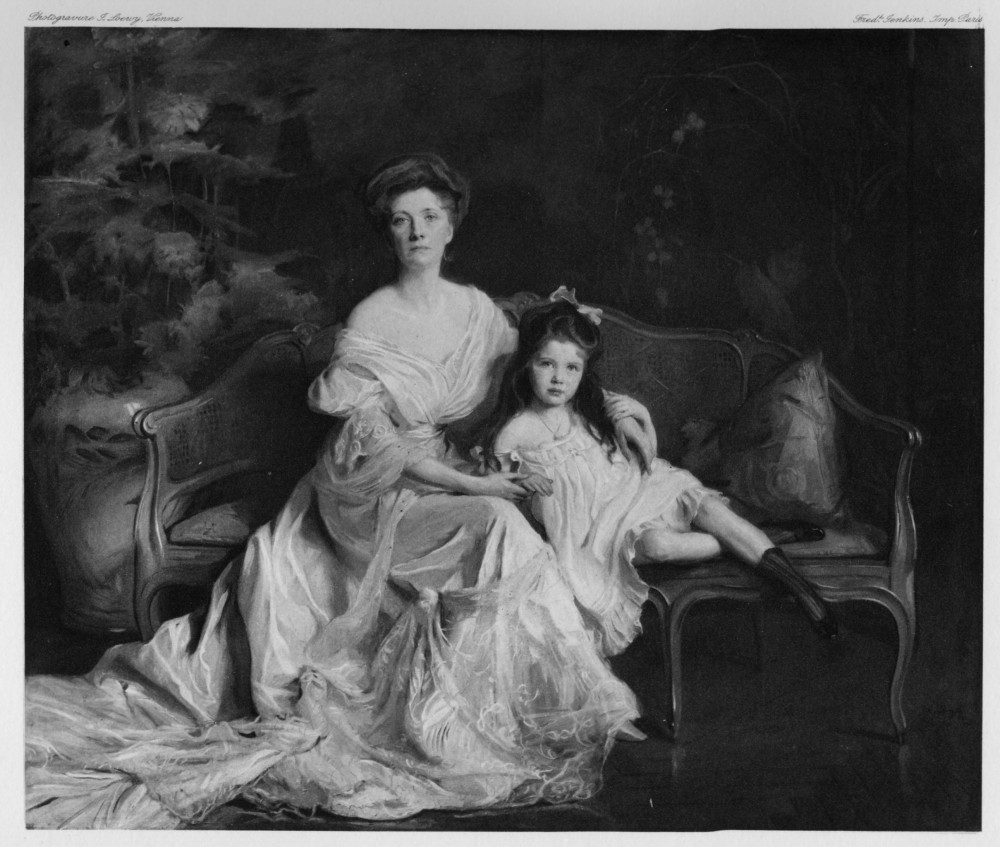
Portrait of his youngest daughter, Countess Karl von Schönborn-Buchheim (née Teresa Dentice di Frasso) and her daughter Countess Franziska Schönborn-Buchheim, by Philip de László, 1906

The Prince was married to Countess Luisa Chotek von Chotkowa und Wognin (1840–1898), a daughter of Count Wilhelm Chotek von Chotkowa und Wognin and Louise von Ugarte. Together, they were the parents of:

- Donna Marianna Dentice di Frasso (b. 1859), who married her cousin, Luigi Capece Minutolo, 2nd Marquis of Bugnano, in 1881.
- Luigi Dentice di Frasso (1861–1947), also a Senator of the Kingdom of Italy who married Countess Emilia von Thurn und Valsássina-Como-Vercelli, in 1910.
- Donna Carolina Dentice di Frasso (1869–1878), who died young.
- Donna Gabriella Dentice di Frasso (b. 1870), who married Count Anton Victor Leopold von Widmann-Sedlnitzky in 1892.
- Don Alfredo Dentice, Count of Frasso (1873–1940), who married Countess Elisabeth Pálffy ab Erdöd (née von Schlippenbach), the daughter of Count Karl Christoph von Schlippenbach, in 1905. From her first marriage to Count Johann Pálffy ab Erdöd, she was the mother of Count Paul Pálffy ab Erdöd, who is known for his eight marriages.
- Don Carlo Dentice, Count of Frasso (1876–1945), who married American Georgine Wilde, stepdaughter of Henry Siegel, in 1903. They divorced in 1921 (she later married William D. Burt), and he married another American, Dorothy Caldwell Grahame-White (née Taylor), the former wife of British aviator Claude Grahame-White, in 1923.
- Donna Teresa Dentice di Frasso (1877–1909), who married Friedrich Karl, 5th Count of Schönborn-Buchheim, son of Erwein, 4th Count of Schönborn-Buchheim. After her death, he married her niece, Donna Sofia Dentice di Frasso, a daughter of Luigi, 8th Prince of Frasso.

The Prince died in Livorno on 23 October 1886. He was succeeded as Prince of Frasso by his eldest son, Luigi.

Ernesto Dentice di Frasso Dentice Family Born: 10 October 1825 Died: 23 October 1886
Italian nobility
Preceded by Luigi Dentice di Frasso	Prince of Frasso; 31 March 1819 – 26 March 1864	Succeeded by Luigi Dentice di Frasso
