= Carlo Dentice di Frasso =

Italian nobleman and politician

Carlo Dentice Count of Frasso
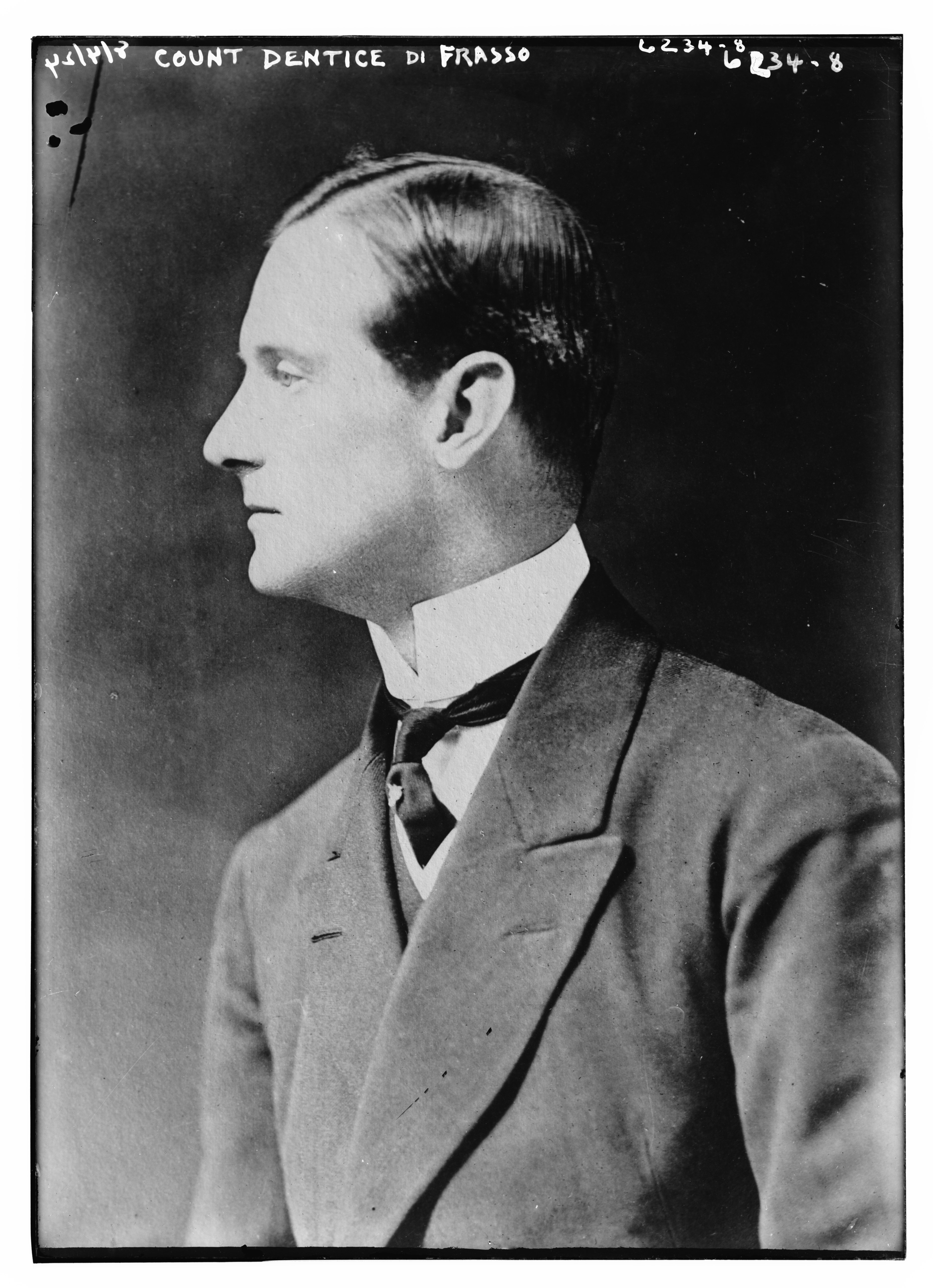
- Count Dentice di Frasso

Member of the Parliament of the Kingdom of Italy

Personal details
- Born: 22 January 1876; San Vito dei Normanni, Kingdom of Italy
- Died: 27 February 1946 (aged 70); Carovigno, Italy
- Spouse(s): Georgine Wilde (m. 1906; div. 1921) Dorothy Taylor Grahame-White (m. 1923; died 1945)
- Parent(s): Ernesto Dentice di Frasso; Luisa Chotek von Chotkowa und Wognin

Count Carlo Dentice di Frasso (22 January 1876 – 27 February 1945) was an Italian nobleman and politician.

== Early life ==
Dentice di Frasso was born on 22 January 1876 in San Vito dei Normanni, Kingdom of Italy. He was a younger son of Senator Ernesto Dentice, 7th Prince of Frasso, and the former Countess Luisa Chotek von Chotkowa und Wognin (1840–1898). Among his siblings were Luigi Dentice di Frasso, 8th Prince of Frasso (who was also a Senator), and Don Count Alfredo Dentice di Frasso.

His paternal grandparents were Luigi Dentice, 6th Prince of Frasso and Donna Anna Maria Serra (a daughter of Maria Antonia Serra, 7th Princess of Gerace, Duchess of Terranova). Among his extended family were aunts Donna Ippolita Emanuela Dentice di Frasso (wife of the Bavarian diplomat Count Count Otto von Bray-Steinburg), and Donna Maria Dentice di Frasso (wife of Ferdinando Capece Minutolo, 1st Marquis of Bugnano). His maternal grandparents were Count Wilhelm Chotek von Chotkowa und Wognin and Louise von Ugarte.

== Career ==
Dentice served in the Parliament of the Kingdom of Italy in 1921. He was said to be a friend of Benito Mussolini.

=== Villa Madama ===
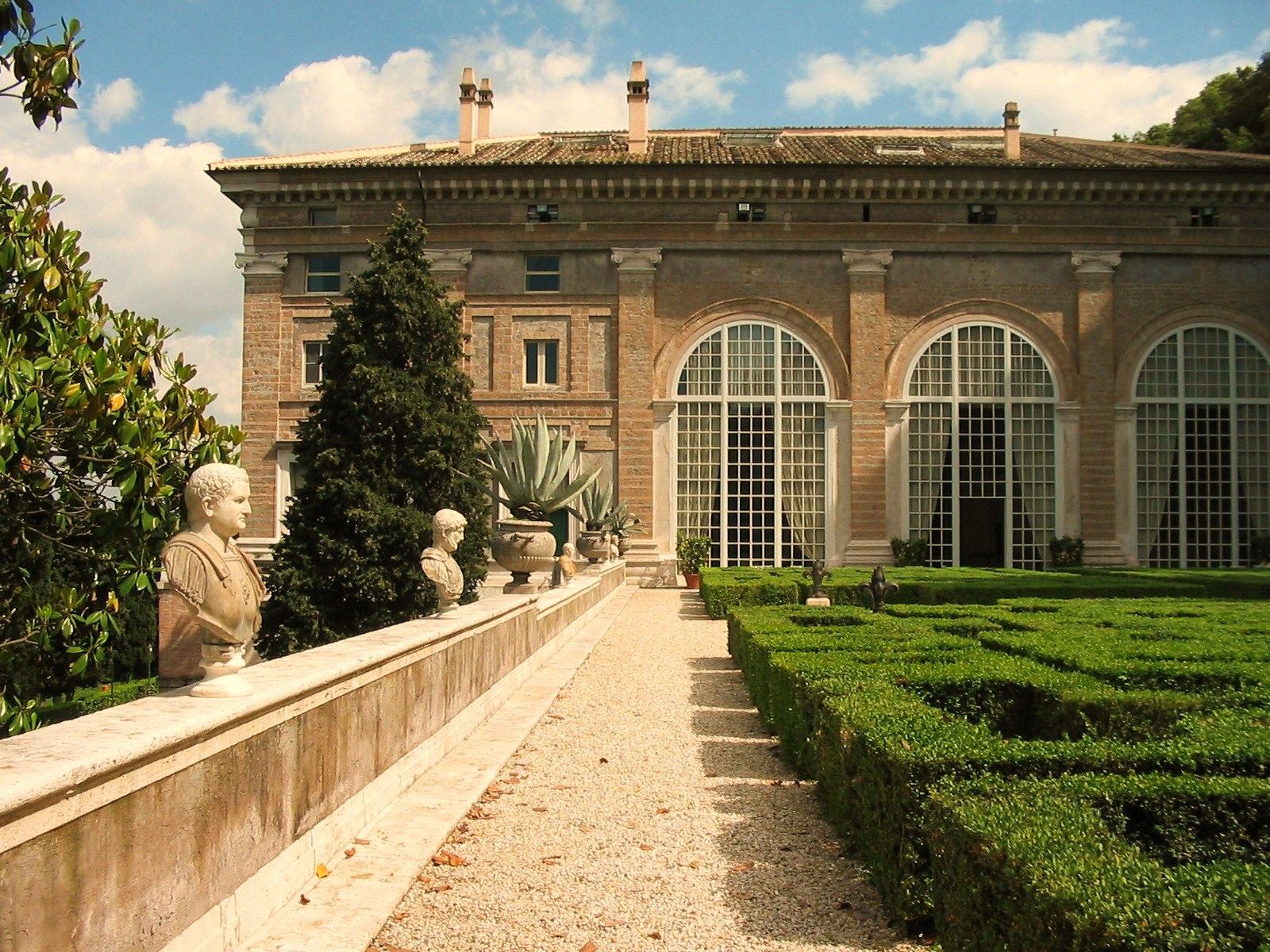
Garden with Raphael's loggia at Villa Madama

In 1925, the Count and his second wife acquired Villa Madama in Rome. The restored the villa, which had been built for the Prime Minister of Italy Cardinal Giulio de' Medici in 1518, and, eventually, leased it to the Italian Ministry for Foreign Affairs, before it was purchased by Mussolini in 1941. Mussolini's monumental neo-Roman Foro Italico sports complex is next to the villa, on the site of its racetrack.

== Personal life ==
On 23 April 1906, Count Carlo married American Georgine Wilde at the Brompton Oratory in London. Georgine was a daughter of the late George M. Wilde and Marie (née Vaughan) Wilde (who was then married to department store founder Henry Siegel). The marriage was annulled in Rome in March 1921 and she later married William Douglas Burt of Providence, Rhode Island.

On 29 June 1923, 47 year-old Dentice married another American heiress, the 35 year-old Dorothy Caldwell (née Taylor) Grahame-White at 280 Park Avenue in New York City (the home of Whitney Warren) in a wedding attended by Prince Gelasio Caetani, the Italian ambassador to the United States. The former wife of British aviator Claude Grahame-White, she was the daughter of Bertrand LeRoy Taylor and Nellie (née Caldwell) Taylor. Her brother, Bertrand L. Taylor Jr., was a financier who served as chairman of the board of governors of the New York Stock Exchange.

The Count of Frasso died on 27 February 1945 in Carovigno. The Countess of Frasso died on 4 January 1954 while aboard a train.
