= Angiolo Maria Colomboni =

Italian painter

Angiolo Maria Colomboni (1608–1672) was an Italian monk, mathematician, and draughtsman, drawing mainly detailed flowers and birds.

He was born in Gubbio in 1608, and joined the monastic order of Olivetans. He applied himself to mathematics. In 1669, while in Bologna, he printed a mathematical text titled Practica Gnomonica. His drawings of flowers and birds, have been compared to those of Giovanni da Udine. In Bologna, he achieved the title of abbot, but returned to Gubbio to indulge his studies.

== Sources ==
- Boni, Filippo de' (1852). Biografia degli artisti ovvero dizionario della vita e delle opere dei pittori, degli scultori, degli intagliatori, dei tipografi e dei musici di ogni nazione che fiorirono da'tempi più remoti sino á nostri giorni. Seconda Edizione.. Venice; Googlebooks: Presso Andrea Santini e Figlio. p. 238.
