= Scipione Stella =

Italian composer

Scipione Stella (1558 or 1559 – May 20, 1622) was a Neapolitan composer. He is to be distinguished from another member of the circle of Carlo Gesualdo, Scipione Dentice.

== Life and career ==
Born in Naples, Stella studied with Giovanni Domenico da Nola who was the maestro di cappella at the Santissima Annunziata Maggiore, Naples. Da Nola recommended Stella for the post of organist at that church in 1579; a post he eventually held from 1583 through 1593. A May 1593 letter written by Spanish composer Sebastián Raval mentions that Stella had performed Raval’s madrigals with Scipione Dentice and Luca Marenzio at the palace of Cardinal Montalto in Naples in May 1953.

By 1594, and possibly earlier, Stella had entered the service of Carlo Gesualdo and accompanied him to Ferrara for his wedding to Eleonora d'Este (1561–1637) on 21 February 1594.

After leaving Gesuldo's service, Stella became a monk and entered the Theatine monastery at the San Paolo Maggiore in Naples on 30 January 1598. At this time he assumed the name Padre Pietro Paolo.

Stella died in Naples on May 20, 1622.

== Works ==
=== Sacred ===
- Motectorum liber primus (Ferrara, ?1595)
- Hymnorum ecclesiasticorum liber primus, hymns for 5 voices (Naples, 1610)
- Pange Lingua gloriosa in the library at the Conservatorio di Musica San Pietro a Majella
- O quam suavis in the library at the Conservatorio di Musica San Pietro a Majella
- Masses, Vespers: lost, cited by C. Tutini

=== Secular ===
- Primo libro de madrigali (Naples, 1609), lost; was part of the private collection of Werner Wolffheim (1877—1930)
- Extent books of madrigals, 1587, 1615
- Three further lost books of madrigals according to musicologist Erich Hermann Müller von Asow.

=== Instrumental ===
- 'Variation on a piece by A. Ferrabosco (1609)
- 4 canzonas in the library at the Conservatorio di Musica San Pietro a Majella
- 3 keyboard works in the British Library
