= Erwein, 4th Count of Schönborn-Buchheim =

Erwein von Schönborn
- Count of Schönborn-Buchheim
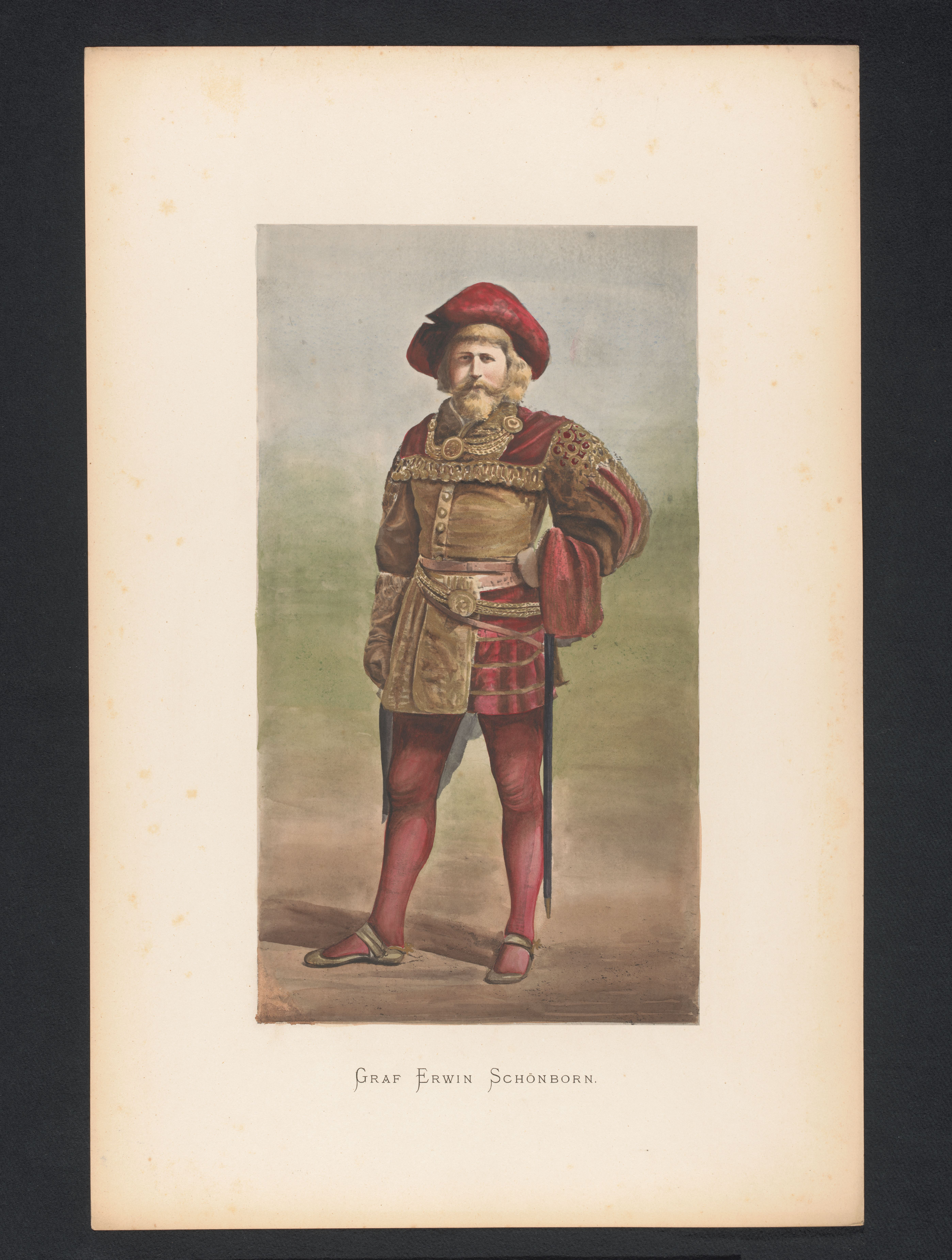
- Born: Erwein Friedrich Karl von Schönborn-Buchheim; 9 November 1842; Göllersdorf, Lower Austria
- Died: 20 January 1903 (aged 60); Göllersdorf, Lower Austria
- Spouse: Franziska von Trauttmansdorff-Weinsberg (m. 1864; died 1898)
- Issue: Princess Anna Marie of Hohenlohe-Langenburg; Princess Franziska of Hohenlohe-Schillingsfürst; Princess Irma of Fürstenberg; Friedrich Karl von Schönborn-Buchheim; Erwein Ferdinand von Schönborn-Buchheim
- House: Schönborn-Buchheim
- Father: Karl Eduard Friedrich von Schönborn-Buchheim
- Mother: Mária Anna Antonia Bolza

Erwein Friedrich Karl, Graf von Schönborn-Buchheim (9 November 1842 – 20 January 1903) was an Austrian landowner and aristocrat.

== Early life ==
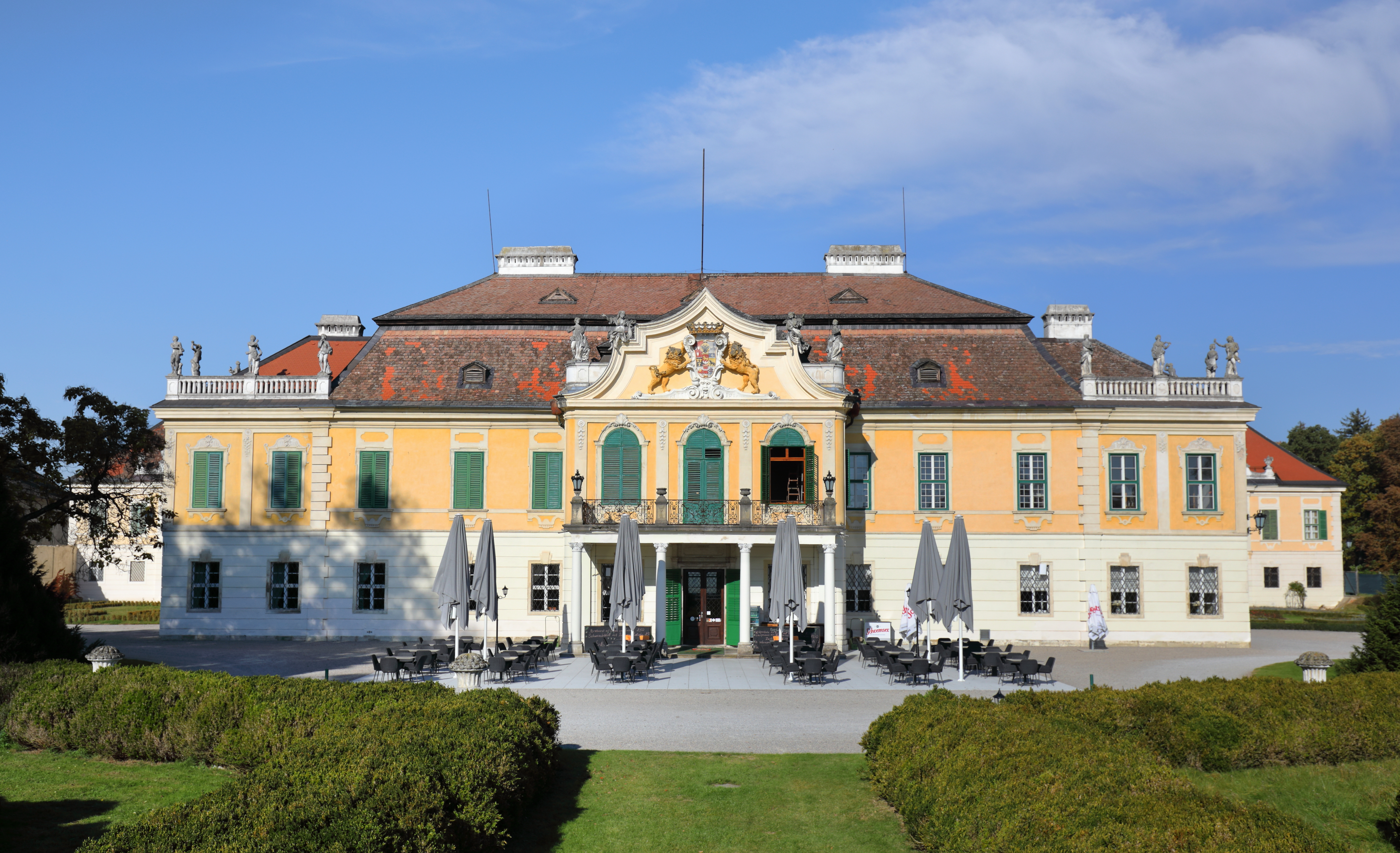
Schloss Schönborn, owned by the House of Schönborn-Buchheim since 1710

Erwein Friedrich Karl was born at the Schönborn Palace in Göllersdorf, Lower Austria. He was the third, but eldest surviving, son of Karl Friedrich Eduard von Schönborn-Buchheim (1803–1854) and Countess Mária Anna Antonia Bolza, who were married at Szarvas in 1833. His surviving siblings were Maria Anna Josephine Karoline (wife of Count Franz von Schaffgotsch), Eugenie Friederike Marie (wife of Count Heinrich von Wurmbrand-Stuppach), Charlotte Anna Sophie (wife of Count Karl von Arco-Valley and Baron Wilhelm Künsberg von Fronberg), and Anna (wife of Count Anton von Ludwigstorff-Goldlamb).

His paternal grandparents were Count Franz Philipp von Schönborn-Buchheim and Countess Maria Sophie von der Leyen (a sister of Philip Francis, Prince of Leyen). His maternal grandparents were Count Franz Joseph von Bolza and Countess Anna Maria Clara Batthyány von Német-Ujvar.

== Career ==
His father became the titular Count of Schönborn-Buchheim in 1844 when his brother, Erwein, resigned his rights in his favor. Ten years later, his father died and eleven year-old Erwein became the 4th Count of Schönborn-Buchheim.

== Personal life ==
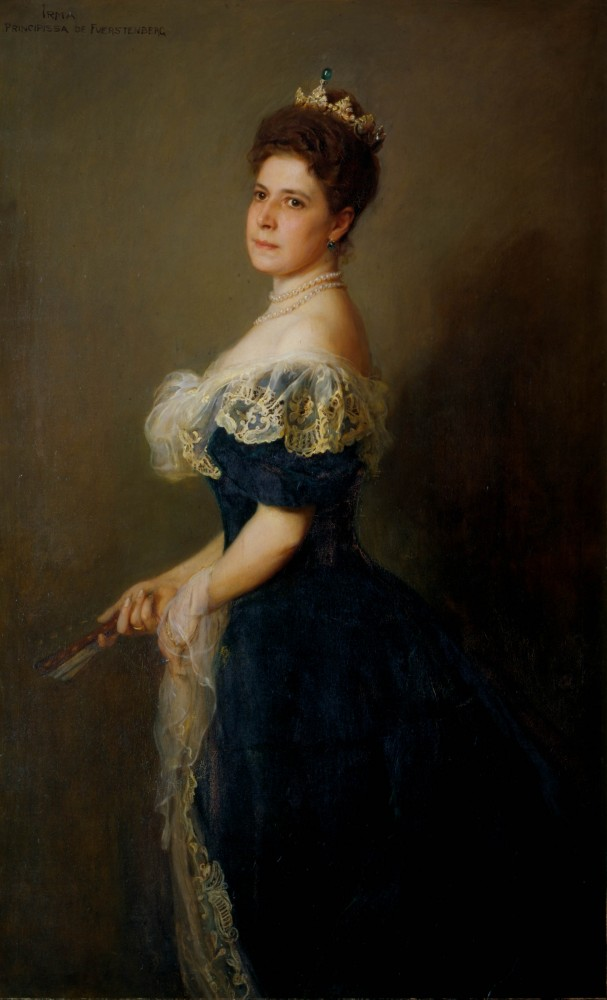
Portrait of his daughter Irma, by Philip de László, 1899

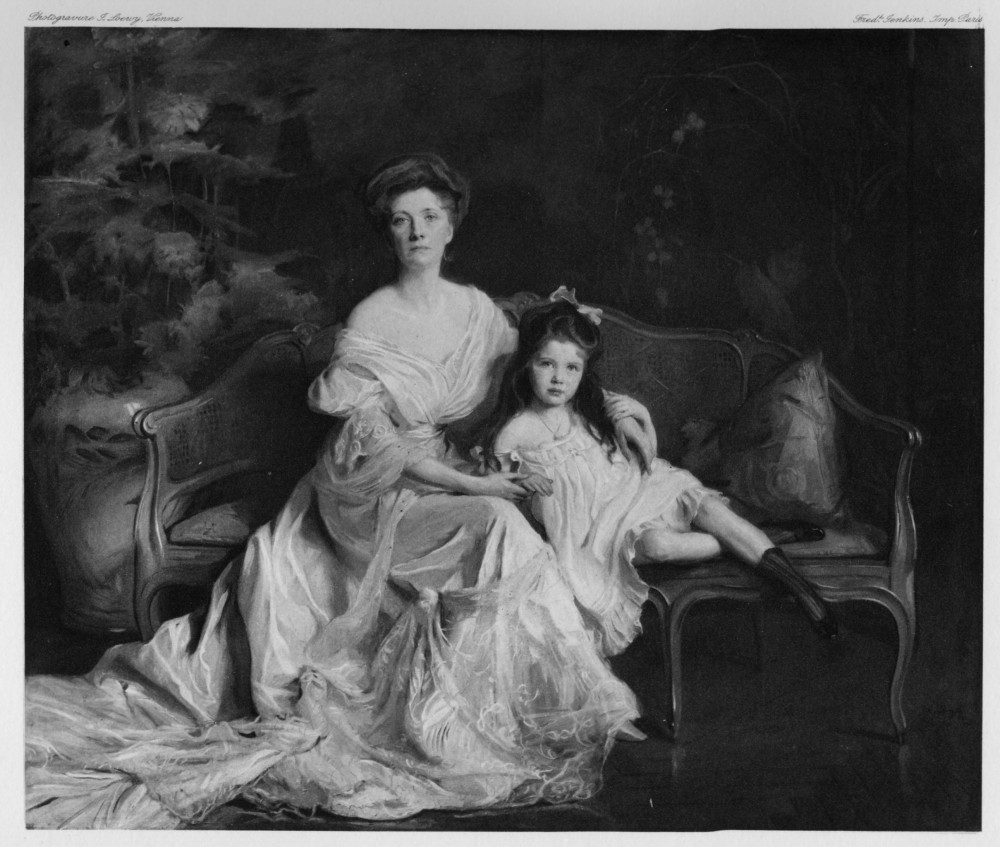
Portrait of his daughter-in-law, Teresa Dentice di Frasso and granddaughter, Countess Franziska Schönborn-Buchheim, by Philip de László, 1906

On 11 April 1864 in Vienna, the Count married Countess Franziska von Trauttmansdorff-Weinsberg (1844–1898), a daughter of Prince Ferdinand Joachim von Trauttmansdorff-Weinsberg (a grandson of Prince Ferdinand von Trauttmansdorff) and Princess Anna of Liechtenstein (a daughter of Prince Karl of Liechtenstein, himself a grandson of Prince Karl Borromäus of Liechtenstein). Together, they were the parents of:

- Anna Marie von Schönborn-Buchheim (1865–1954), who married Prince Gottfried Karl Joseph of Hohenlohe-Langenburg, a son of Prince Ludwig Karl Gustav of Hohenlohe-Langenburg and Countess Maria Gabriele von Trauttmansdorff, in 1890.
- Franziska von Schönborn-Buchheim (1866–1937), who married Prince Konrad of Hohenlohe-Schillingsfürst, son of Prince Konstantin of Hohenlohe-Waldenburg-Schillingsfürst and Princess Marie of Sayn-Wittgenstein-Berleburg, in 1888.
- Irma Caroline Gabrielle von Schönborn-Buchheim (1867–1946), who married Maximilian Egon II, Prince of Fürstenberg, the son of Prince Maximilian Egon I of Fürstenberg (a younger son of Charles Egon III, Prince of Fürstenberg) and Countess Leontina von Khevenhüller-Metsch, in 1889.
- Friedrich Karl von Schönborn-Buchheim (1869–1932), who married Donna Teresa Dentice di Frasso, a daughter of Count Don Ernesto, 7th Prince Dentice di Frasso, and Countess Luisa Chotek von Chotkowa und Wognin, in 1901. After her death in 1909, he married his late wife's niece, Donna Sofia Dentice di Frasso, a daughter of Don Luigi, 8th Prince Dentice di Frasso and Countess Emilia von Thurn und Valsássina-Como-Vercelli, in 1910. They divorced in 1922.
- Erwein Ferdinand Karl Rochus von Schönborn-Buchheim (1871–1937), who married American socialite Katherine "Kitty" (née Wolff) Spotswood, the daughter of Dr. Lawrence Wolff and former wife of Dandridge Spotswood, in 1911. They divorced in 1924 and she married banker Baron Eugène von Rothschild.

The Count died on 20 January 1903 at Göllersdorf, Lower Austria, and was succeeded by his eldest son, Friedrich Karl.

=== Descendants ===
Through his son Friedrich Karl, he was a grandfather of Countess Franziska of Schönborn-Buchheim (1902–1987), who married Prince Alfred of Lippe-Weissenfeld (parents of Princess Teresa of Lippe-Weissenfeld, who married industrialist Baron Hans Heinrich Thyssen-Bornemisza and Prince Friedrich Maximilian zu Fürstenberg); and Georg von Schönborn-Buchheim (1906–1989), himself the father of Friedrich Karl von Schönborn-Buchheim who married Princess Isabelle d'Orleans of France (eldest daughter of Henri, Count of Paris) in 1964.

Through his daughter Franziska, he was a grandfather of Prince Alfred of Hohenlohe-Schillingsfürst, and Princess Franziska of Hohenlohe-Waldenburg-Schillingsfürst (1897–1989), who married Archduke Maximilian of Austria, thereby becoming sister-in-law of Archduke Karl Franz of Austria, the last Emperor of Austria.
