= Giuseppe Tarantino =

Italian philosopher (1857-1950)

Giuseppe Tarantino (Italian pronunciation: [dʒuˈzɛppe taranˈtino]; Gravina in Puglia, 22 July 1857 – Gravina in Puglia, 25 January 1950) was an Italian philosopher, professor of moral philosophy and pedagogy and rector at the University of Pisa, Italy.

== Biography ==
Giuseppe Tarantino was born in Gravina in Puglia. His father was Filippo Tarantino, a local nobleman, while his mother was Letizia Spagnuolo.

He studied in the high school of his hometown, helped by his uncle Nicola. Then he studied in Pisa, first at the University of Pisa and then at Scuola Normale Superiore di Pisa. He studied under the guide of Francesco Fiorentino.

He graduated at the age of 22 in literature and philosophy (lettere e filosofia); then he followed his mentor Fiorentino in Napoli and there he stayed until the death of Fiorentino, in 1884. Tarantino dedicated his work Saggi Filosofici to the memory of his mentor Fiorentino; in the same year he was assigned the chair of theoretical philosophy. He started to achieve prominence thanks to his critical essays published on newspaper Il Giornale Napoletano. For over ten years, he was focused on his work Saggio sulla volontà, published in 1897. He had a short-lived relationship with a Florence woman whose name was "Bice", even though he was attached to another woman from Gravina in Puglia, whom he had met in 1891 in Naples.

For a certain period, he neglected his relationship in order to focus on his works. From 1886 to 1888, he taught at Liceo Marciano. In 1887 he was appointed as a teacher of philosophy at Liceo Antonio Genovesi of Naples. In September 1891, he successfully applied for the chair of theoretical philosophy in Palermo. He started to gain wider recognition thanks to his critical essays published on the journal Rivista di Filosofia Scientifica (by Morselli). Of those essays, the most notable is probably the one about John Locke.

Among his former pupils were Enrico de Nicola and the nobleman Francesco Dentice di Accadia, prefect of Pisa. In the last part of his life, he returned to his hometown Gravina in Puglia, where he lived in the house of one of his nephews who had the same name and had formerly studied in Pisa under his patronage. In 1947, Tarantino donated a large part of his collection of books to the library "Ettore Pomarici Santomasi", located in Gravina in Puglia.

High school Liceo Scientifico "Giuseppe Tarantino", located in Tarantino's hometown Gravina in Puglia, has been named after him.

== Contributions ==
Tarantino contributed to introduce American and European philosophy to the Italian educational system. He had been mostly forgotten after his death, until a collection of his writings on philosophy and pedagogy (Speranze e Proposte Formative nel Primo Novecento: la Lezione di Giuseppe Tarantino, written by Filippo Tarantino) was published by Levante in 1995.

Tarantino is best known for his critique of Thomas Hobbes, which focused on the relationship between Hobbes's logic and psychology. An earlier book on the concept of free will, Saggio sulla Volontà, was also well received by anglophone philosophers.

== Works ==
- Appunti di Filosofia ad uso dei giovani del Liceo, Filippo Toso, Aversa 1885.
- Saggi filosofici. Naples: Vincenzo Morano. 1885.
- "Studio storico su Giovanni Locke". Rivista di Filosofia. II. Milano-Torino: F.lli Dumolard. 1886.
- Saggio sul criticismo e sull'associazionismo di Davide Hume, Napoli, Vincenzo Morano, 1887.
- In morte di Michelangelo Calderoni, Vecchi, Trani 1889.
- Saggio sulla volontà, Napoli, Tip. editrice F. di Gennaro e A. Morano, 1897.
- In morte di Antonietta Cagiati, nella necrologia per Gaetano e Antonietta Cagiati, Napoli 1898.
- Saggio sulle idee morali e politiche di Tommaso Hobbes, Napoli, Tip. F. Giannini & Figli, 1900
- Il problema della morale di fronte al positivismo e alla metafisica, Pisa, Tip. A. Valenti, 1901.
- Il principio dell'etica e la crisi morale contemporanea, Napoli, A. Tessitore & figlio, 1904.
- Il concetto dello stato ed il principio di nazionalità, Napoli 1917
- Discorso preposto alle traduzioni dal latino, dall’inglese e dal francese di G. Sottile. Napoli 1917.
- Leonardo da Vinci e la scienza della natura. Nel centenario di L. da Vinci, 1919.
- La politica e la morale. Discorso , Pisa, Tipografia editrice cav. F. Mariotti, 1920.
- Sulla riforma universitaria, in «Rivista di filosofia» 1921.

== Bibliography ==
- Filippo Tarantino; Liborio Dibattista; Rosalba Pappalardi; Angelo Recchia-Luciani (2014). Filippo Tarantino (ed.). L'inconscio e la coscienza nel pensiero di Giuseppe Tarantino (PDF). Mario Adda Editore. ISBN 9788867171217.
- Filippo Tarantino, Speranze e proposte formative nel primo Novecento. La lezione di Giuseppe Tarantino, Bari, Levante, 1995. ISBN 88-7949-097-4
- Beniamino D'Amato. Orazione funebre in onore di Giuseppe Tarantino (PDF).
