= Giovanni Nanni =

Giovanni Nanni may refer to:

- Annio da Viterbo, Dominican friar and forger of documents
- Giovanni da Udine, painter
