= Luigi Dentice di Frasso =

Italian nobleman and politician

Luigi Dentice 8th Prince of Frasso
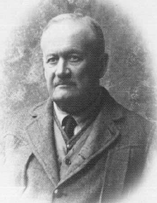

Senator of the Kingdom of Italy
- In office 27 November 1908 – 9 February 1909

Member of the Parliament of the Kingdom of Italy
- In office 1895–1900

Personal details
- Born: 19 August 1861 Brühl, Kingdom of Prussia
- Died: 28 July 1947 (aged 85) Rome, Italy
- Spouse: Emilia von Thurn und Valsássina-Como-Vercelli (1885–1947)
- Relations: Alfredo Dentice di Frasso (brother); Carlo Dentice di Frasso (brother)
- Parent(s): Ernesto Dentice di Frasso; Luisa Chotek von Chotkowa und Wognin

Luigi Dentice, 8th Prince of Frasso (19 August 1861 – 28 July 1947) was an Italian nobleman and politician.

== Early life ==
Luigi Dentice di Frasso was born in Brühl in the Kingdom of Prussia on 19 August 1861 into an aristocratic family of the Kingdom of the Two Sicilies. He was the eldest son of Senator Ernesto Dentice, 7th Prince of Frasso (1825–1886), and the former Countess Luisa Chotek von Chotkowa und Wognin (1840–1898). Among his siblings were fellow politicians, Count Alfredo Dentice di Frasso and Count Carlo Dentice di Frasso.

His paternal grandparents were Luigi Dentice, 6th Prince of Frasso and Donna Anna Maria Serra (a daughter of Maria Antonia Serra, 7th Princess of Gerace, Duchess of Terranova). Among his extended family were aunts Donna Ippolita Emanuela Dentice di Frasso (wife of the Bavarian diplomat Count Count Otto von Bray-Steinburg), and Donna Maria Dentice di Frasso (wife of Ferdinando Capece Minutolo, 1st Marquis of Bugnano). His maternal grandparents were Count Wilhelm Chotek von Chotkowa und Wognin and Louise von Ugarte.

== Career ==
Like his father before him, he served in the Parliament of the Kingdom of Italy during the 19th and 20th Legislatures. He later served in as member of the Senate of the Kingdom of Italy from 17 November 1908 in the 22nd Legislature.

== Personal life ==
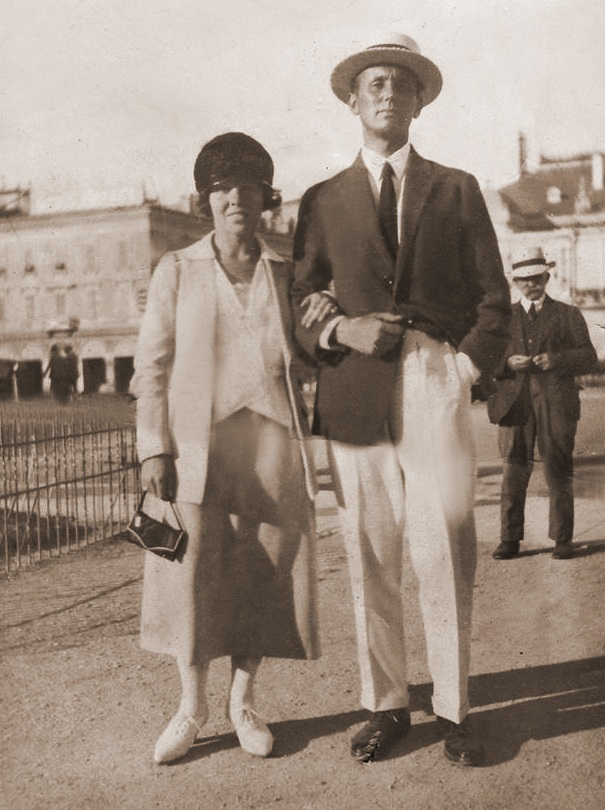
Luigi Dentice di Frasso's eldest son, Ernesto Dentice di Frasso, later 9th Prince of Frasso, with his wife Nadine Ivanovna Sanine at Place Masséna in Nice on 22 July 1922.

In 1885, the Prince married Countess Emilia von Thurn und Valsássina-Como-Vercelli (1866–1960), daughter of Count Joseph von Thurn und Valsássina-Como-Vercelli and Sophie Vrints zu Falkenstein. Together, they were the parents of:

- Ernesto, 9th Prince of Frasso (1886–1978), who married Nadine Ivanovna Sanine in 1922, daughter of Ivan Petrovitch Sanine and Eugénie Petrovna Sorokooumowsky; her grandfather, Piotr Pavlovitch Sorokooumowsky, was one of the last fur merchants to the Imperial Russian court.
- Count Massimiliano Dentice di Frasso (1887–1916), who died unmarried.
- Donna Sofia Dentice di Frasso (1889–1968), who married Friedrich Karl, 5th Count of Schönborn-Buchheim, the son of Erwein, 4th Count of Schönborn-Buchheim and widower of Sofia's aunt, Donna Teresa Dentice di Frasso, in 1910. They divorced in 1922.
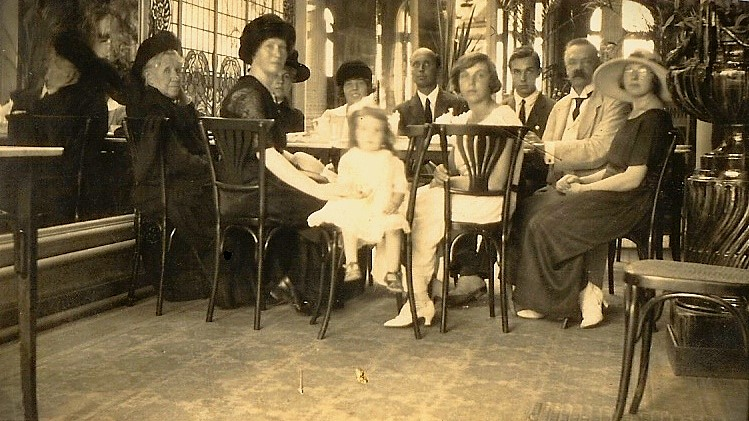
  Engagement of Ernesto Dentice di Frasso and Nadine Ivanovna Sanine at the Jetée-Promenade in Nice on 22 July 1922. Ernesto Dentice di Frasso stands at the center beside his fiancée.
  Count Gerardo Giuseppe Dentice di Frasso (1890–1960), who married Donna Giovanna Colonna, daughter of Don Stefano Colonna, dei Principi di Paliano and sister to Don Guido Colonna di Paliano, in 1927.
- Count Pietro Dentice di Frasso (1902–c. 1969), who married Yolanda Bernárdez, former wife of Don Stefano Sanjust di Teulada and daughter of Uruguayan diplomat Manuel Bernárdez.

The Prince died in Rome on 28 July 1947. He was succeeded as Prince of Frasso by his eldest son, Ernesto.

Luigi Dentice di Frasso Dentice Family Born: 19 August 1861 Died: 28 July 1947
Italian nobility
| Preceded by Ernesto Dentice di Frasso | Prince of Frasso; 26 March 1864 – 28 July 1947 | Succeeded by Ernesto Dentice di Frasso |
