= Scipione Dentice =

Italian composer

Scipione Dentice (29 January 1560 – 21 April 1633) was a Neapolitan keyboard composer.

== Early life ==
Scipione was born into the noble Dentice family. His grandfather was Luigi Dentice, the music theorist, and his uncle was Fabrizio Dentice, the lutenist.

== Career ==
He is to be distinguished from his colleague and exact contemporary Scipione Stella, a member of Carlo Gesualdo's circle. The two Scipiones were acquainted; the Spanish composer Sebastián Raval records that both Scipione Dentice and Scipione Stella were present with Luca Marenzio at the Peretti palace in Rome when he performed.
