= Francesco Dentice di Accadia =

Italian nobleman and politician

Francesco Dentice Prince of Arecco Count of Santa Maria Ingrisone
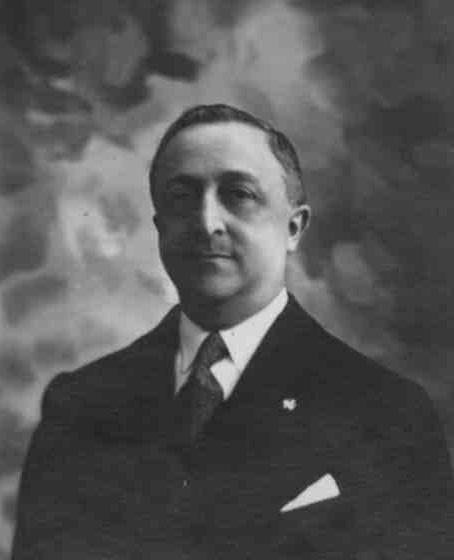

Member of the Senate of the Kingdom of Italy
- In office 22 May 1939 – 5 August 1943

Personal details
- Born: 16 December 1873; Naples, Kingdom of Italy
- Died: 4 March 1944 (aged 70); Rome, Kingdom of Italy
- Spouse(s): Beatrice de Luca (m. 1897; died 1912) Clotilde Azzolini (died 1944)
- Children: Aldo Dentice di Accadia

Francesco Dentice di Accadia (16 December 1873 – 4 March 1944), 3rd Prince of Arecco, 8th Count of Santa Maria Ingrisone, was an Italian nobleman and politician.

== Early life ==
Dentice was born in Naples on 16 December 1873 into a Neapolitan patrician family. He was the of Antonio Dentice (b. 1852) and Luisa Tortora Brayda di Belvedere. Among his siblings were Carlo Dentice, Giulia Dentice, and Luigi Dentice.

His paternal grandparents were Giulia Cimino (of the Marquesses of Terra di Casolla Valenzano) and Francesco Dentice, Inspector of the Banco di Napoli. His maternal grandparents were Carlo Tortora Brayda di Belvedere, 20th Baron of Tortora, and Margherita Boccapianola.

He studied in Pisa under the aegis of the philosopher Giuseppe Tarantino, who was the rector at the University of Pisa.

== Career ==
In 1901, he entered the Ministry of the Interior. He served as prefect of Treviso from 11 February 1926 to 30 June 1928, as prefect of Forlì from 2 September 1928 to 3 August 1930, and prefect of Pisa from 3 August 1930 to 11 January 1934. While prefect, he simultaneously presided over the local chambers of commerce. He was appointed Deputy Governor of Rome on 14 August 1936, where he was president, then government commissioner, at the Rome Opera House. From 22 May 1939 to 5 August 1943, he served as a senator in the 30th Parliament of the Kingdom of Italy.

On 27 May 1929, he was granted the title of "Marquis" by royal decree. His claim of his family's dormant noble titles, Count of Santa Maria Ingrisone and Prince of Arecco, was recognized by decree of the Head of Government on 30 April 1937, thereby becoming the 3rd Prince of Arecco (created in 1733) and 8th Count of Santa Maria Ingrisone (created in 1705).

== Personal life ==
On 2 October 1897, he was married to Beatrice de Luca. Before her death on 7 February 1912, they were the parents of:

- Donna Ada Dentice di Accadia, who married Silvio Arata.
- Donna Germana Dentice di Accadia.
- Donna Luisa "Gigia" Dentice di Accadia, who married Domenico Lenzi.

He remarried to Clotilde Azzolini, who was born in Paris in 1878 and died in Rome in 1967. Together, they were the parents of:

- Don Aldo Dentice di Accadia (b. 1926), who married Franca Bresciani in 1962.

The Prince, who lived at Via Alessandro Torlonia 27, died in Rome on 4 March 1944.
