= Achille Falcone =

Italian composer

Achille Falcone (ca. 1570-75 – 9 November 1600) was an Italian composer.

Born in Cosenza, the son of Antonio Falcone, he was maestro di cappella at Caltagirone, Sicily, and known for his madrigals. He was challenged to a musical duel by Sebastian Raval, maestro di cappella at Palermo, which Falcone won, but the decision was later reversed. After his son's early death, his father Antonio published the materials of the duel in his Relazione del successo to defend his son's reputation.

== Works ==
- Madrigali, mottetti e ricercari: madrigali a cinque voci
