= Villa Madama =

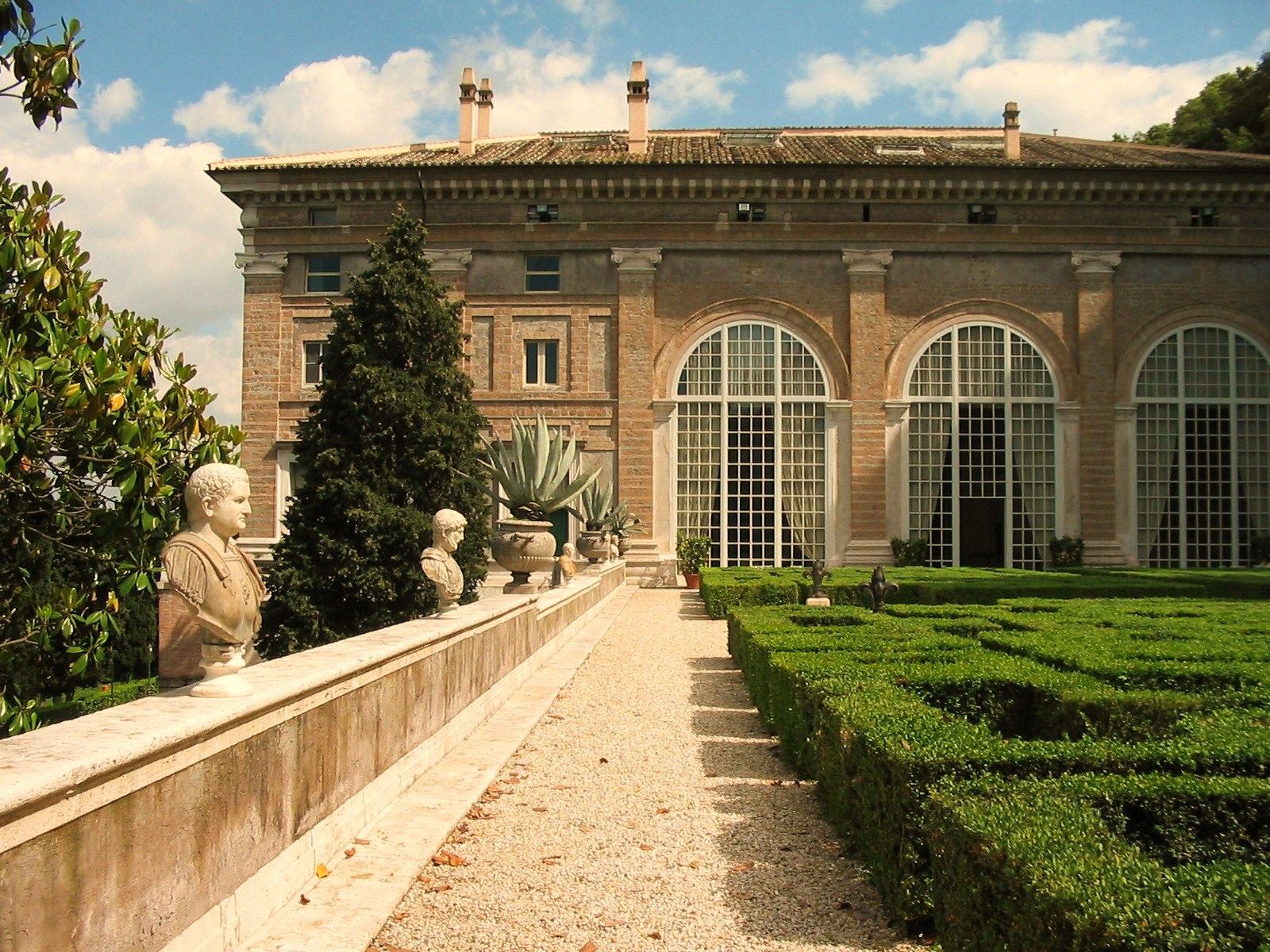
- Garden with Raphael's loggia
- Click on the map for a fullscreen view

General information
- Location: Rome, Italy
- Coordinates: 41°55′42″N 12°27′10″E
- Construction started: 1518
- Completed: 1525
- Client: Cardinal Giulio de' Medici; Prime Minister of Italy

Design and construction
- Architects: Raphael; Antonio da Sangallo the Younger

Villa Madama is a Renaissance-style rural palace (villa) located on Via di Villa Madama #250 in Rome, Italy. Located west of the city center and a few miles north of the Vatican, and just south of the Foro Olimpico Stadium. Even though incomplete, this villa with its loggia and segmented columned garden court and its casino with an open center and terraced gardens, was initially planned by Raphael, and highly influential for subsequent architects of the High Renaissance.

== Construction ==
In the 1518, then the Cardinal Giulio de' Medici, cousin of the reigning pontiff Leo X, commissioned the initial design of the villa from Raphael. However Raphael died in 1520, and the work continued under disciples of Raphael, including Antonio da Sangallo the Younger in construction and a large team involved in the decoration. There appear to have been frequent disputes over the plans. Construction soon ceased and the villa was far from complete, when after the death of Leo X in 1521, the cardinal had returned to Florence. In 1523, with Giulio de' Medici's ascension to Pope Clement VII, work restarted and the apartment and garden loggia were completed that year. The decorations of the Villa are by Giulio Romano and Baldassare Peruzzi, both major architects in their own right; Giovanni da Udine completed the bas-reliefs in stucco, inspired by the classic Ancient Roman reliefs unearthed from the then rediscovered Domus Aurea of Nero; and finally, both Giovan Francesco Penni ("il Fattore") and the Florentine sculptor Baccio Bandinelli worked there too. Aside from the Raphael loggia, the villa's greatest artistic element is the salone painted by Giulio Romano, with its magnificent vaulted ceiling.

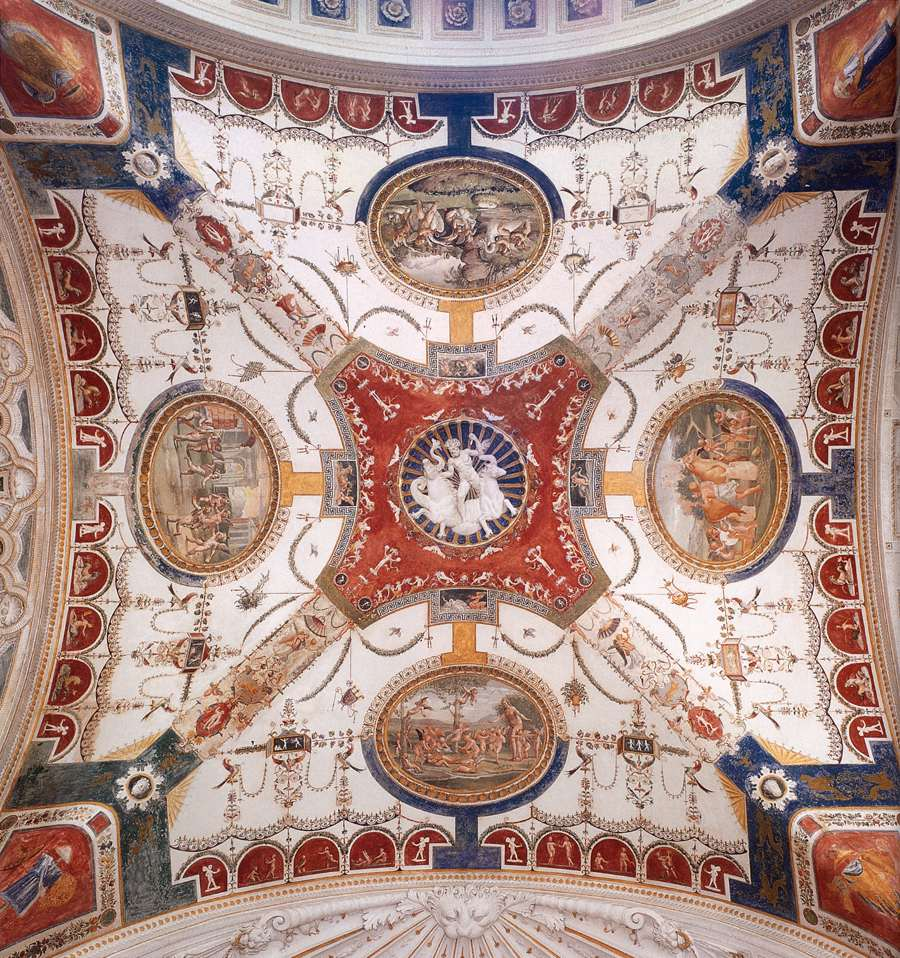
Ceiling decoration of one bay of the garden loggia (Giovanni da Udine, c. 1521)

In 1527, during the Sack of Rome, parts of the structure were pillaged and suffered from fire. Some sections were rebuilt, but the villa was never completed. It is not entirely clear how much of the layout and decoration can be attributed to any one of the artists involved.

== Legacy and gardens ==
The Villa Madama was one of the first of the revived Roman type of suburban villas designed for parties and entertainment built in 16th century Rome, and it was consciously conceived to rival descriptions of the villas of Antiquity, like Pliny's famous description of his own.

It had a courtyard with a monumental flight of steps, a circular court around which formal gardens were arranged, an open-air theater excavated in the hillside, a hippodrome below, and a terraced garden with views of the Tiber river.

In the garden facing the loggia, the Elephant Fountain, designed by Giovanni da Udine, commemorates the Indian elephant "Annone", brought to Rome by a Portuguese ambassador for the consecration of Leo X in 1514.

== Ownership after completion ==
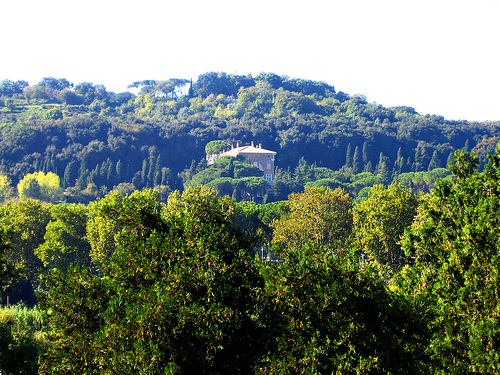
Viewed from a distance

The "Madama" of its name was Margaret of Austria, the same who is remembered in Palazzo Madama in Rome, seat of the Italian Senate. After the death of Clement VII, the villa remained Medici property, first belonging to Cardinal Ippolito de' Medici, and later to Duke Alessandro, Lord of Florence, who married Margaret of Parma the illegitimate daughter of Charles V, but left her a widow at the age of 15. She married Ottavio Farnese, a nephew of Pope Paul III and was soon widowed again, but at Margaret's death, the villa passed into the Farnese family, Dukes of Parma and Piacenza, who let it slowly fall into ruin.

The villa was restored by Count Carlo Dentice di Frasso, who acquired the property in 1925, and his American wife, the former Dorothy Cadwell Taylor. Eventually the Frassos leased it to the Italian Ministry for Foreign Affairs, and it was soon purchased by Mussolini in 1941. Mussolini's monumental neo-Roman Foro Italico sports complex is next to the villa, on the site of its racetrack.

Villa Madama is the property of the Italian Government, which uses it for international guests and press conferences. Entrance is limited and touring of gardens requires prior permission with Ministry of Foreign Affairs. On April 20, 2015 the Italian EU Presidency hosted a dinner in the Villa Madama for all Speakers and Presidents of national parliaments of the European Union.

Preceded by Villa Giulia	Landmarks of Rome; Villa Madama	Succeeded by Fontana delle Api
