= Francesco Fiorentino (philosopher) =

Italian philosopher and historiographer

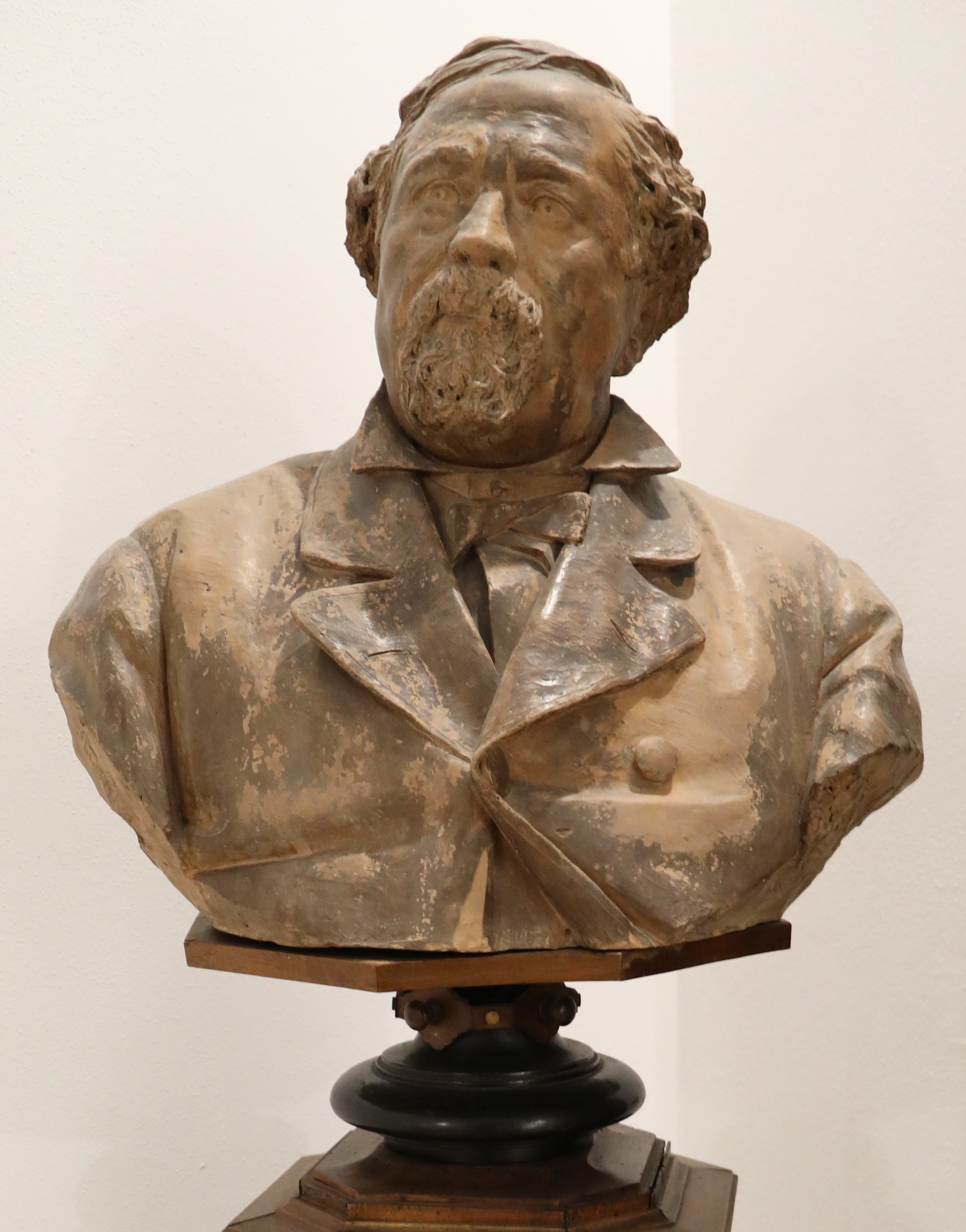
Francesco Fiorentino (philosopher)

Francesco Fiorentino (Sambiase, 1 May 1834 – Naples, 22 December 1884) was an Italian philosopher and historiographer.

== Biography ==
He was born in Sambiase (now Lamezia Terme) on 1 May 1834. His father was Gennaro Fiorentino, a chemist and a pharmacist, and his mother was Saveria Sinopoli. He was educated by Giorgio and Bruno Sinopoli, the uncle and the brother of his mother, respectively. He studied literature and theology, but he quit in 1851. After two years spent in Sambiase studying theology, he moved to Catanzaro where he studied jurisprudence, but he couldn't graduate because he was just 19.

Even if he was short-sighted and he never shot a gun before, Fiorentino attempted to take part in the Expedition of the Thousand, but he failed. When he met Giuseppe Garibaldi in Maida, Fiorentino's quoted to have said to him "Viva l'annessione, vogliamo l'annessione!", which in English is "Horray for the annexation, we want the annexation!".

After the Italian unification he became a teacher of philosophy in a Liceo in Spoleto, Umbria.

== Works and thoughts ==
In 1861 he moved from Spoleto to Maddaloni, near Naples, where he published: Il Panteismo di Giordano Bruno (The Pantheism of Giordano Bruno). Fiorentino used to compare himself to Giordano Bruno for their similar character and to Vincenzo Gioberti for their similar political views. Thanks to this book he became a teacher at the University of Bologna in 1862. He stayed there for nine years, and here he wrote many books, like Pietro Pomponazzi or Scritti varii.

In 1871 he moved to Naples to teach philosophy of history. He lived there with Restituta Trebbe, a woman that he loved intensely. They had four sons. In 1875 Fiorentino started to teach theoretical philosophy at the University of Pisa. There he wrote Elementi di filosofia ad uso dei Licei, an important schoolbook used for decades for the teaching of philosophy in the liceo.

In 1880 he came back to Naples to teach philosophy at the university again. He founded the Giornale Napoletano in 1883. After being elected two times as a Deputy in the Italian Parliament (the first in 1870 and the second in 1874) he tried to be elected again in 1882, but he failed.

He died in Naples on 22 December 1884 of a heart attack, at age 51. In 1887 his remains were transferred to Catanzaro, where a memorial for him was built. Another memorial was built in 1909 in his hometown, Sambiase.

Despite the fact that he taught in public school for twenty-four years, his family didn't receive any pension because of six missing months of teaching.

=== Books ===
- Volgarizzazione dell'Itinerario della mente a Dio di S. Bonaventura, dei Libri del Maestro, Dell'immortalità dell'anima e Del libero arbitrio di S. Aurelio Agostino, del Proslogio di S. Anselmo, Messina, 1858
- Il panteismo di Giordano Bruno, Naples, 1861
- Historic assay of Greek philosophy, Florence 1864
- Pietro Pomponazzi, studi storici sulla scuola bolognese e padovana del secolo XVI, Florence, 1868
- Bernardino Telesio, ossia studi storici sull'Idea della Natura nel Risorgimento italiano, Firenze, 1872–1873
- La filosofia contemporanea in Italia, Naples, 1876
- Scritti vari di letteratura, poesia e critica, Naples, 1876
- Elementi di filosofia, Naples, 1877
- Della vita e opere di Vincenzo de Grazia, Naples, 1877
- Manuale di storia della filosofia, Naples, 1879–1881
- Elementi di filosofia, Naples, 1880
- Il Risorgimento filosofico nel Quattrocento, Naples, 1885 e 1994 ISBN 88-85239-10-2

== Bibliography ==
- G. Galati, Interpretazione dell'opera di Francesco Fiorentino, in «Archivio storico della filosofia italiana», 1936
- G. Oldrini, La cultura filosofica napoletana dell'Ottocento, Bari, 1973
- P. Di Giovanni, A cento anni dalla nascita dell'idealismo italiano, from «Bollettino della Società Filosofica Italiana», 2000
