= Luigi Dentice =

Italian composer

Luigi Dentice (1510 in Naples – 1566 in Naples) was an Italian composer, musical theorist, singer and lutenist who served the powerful Sanseverino family, and was father of Fabrizio Dentice (1539 – 1581), also a composer and lutenist. He was grandfather of Scipione Dentice (1560–1633).

== Biography ==
Dentice came from the noble Dentice family. When his father died in 1561 he inherited the title of Baron of Viggiano. He married Vincenza Caracciolo, who in 1566 was left a widow with two young children. In the 1550s the Dentices travelled extensively in Spain. As a singer, Luigi Dentice appears to have sung as a male soprano falsettist.

His main work of music theory Duo dialoghi della musica, Rome 1553, was a collection of classical Greek and Latin writings on music, translated into Italian, with Dentice's own commentary. The title promises one dialogue on theory, another on practice. The text is interspersed with a few comments on contemporary music and musicians. It also includes Dentice's opinions on inflection in musica ficta,, and the practice of monody later developed by Giulio Caccini and others.

== Works ==
- Songs in posthumous collection Arie Raccolti, printed Rocco Rodio, Naples 1577.

== Selected discography ==
- Two songs: Come t'haggio lassata, o via mia? Chi me l'havesse dett', o via mia? on Napolitane - villanelle, arie & moresche (1530-70). Ensemble Micrologus, Cappella della Pietà de' Turchini dir. Florio, Opus111 1999
