= Giovanni da Udine =

Italian painter (1487–1564)

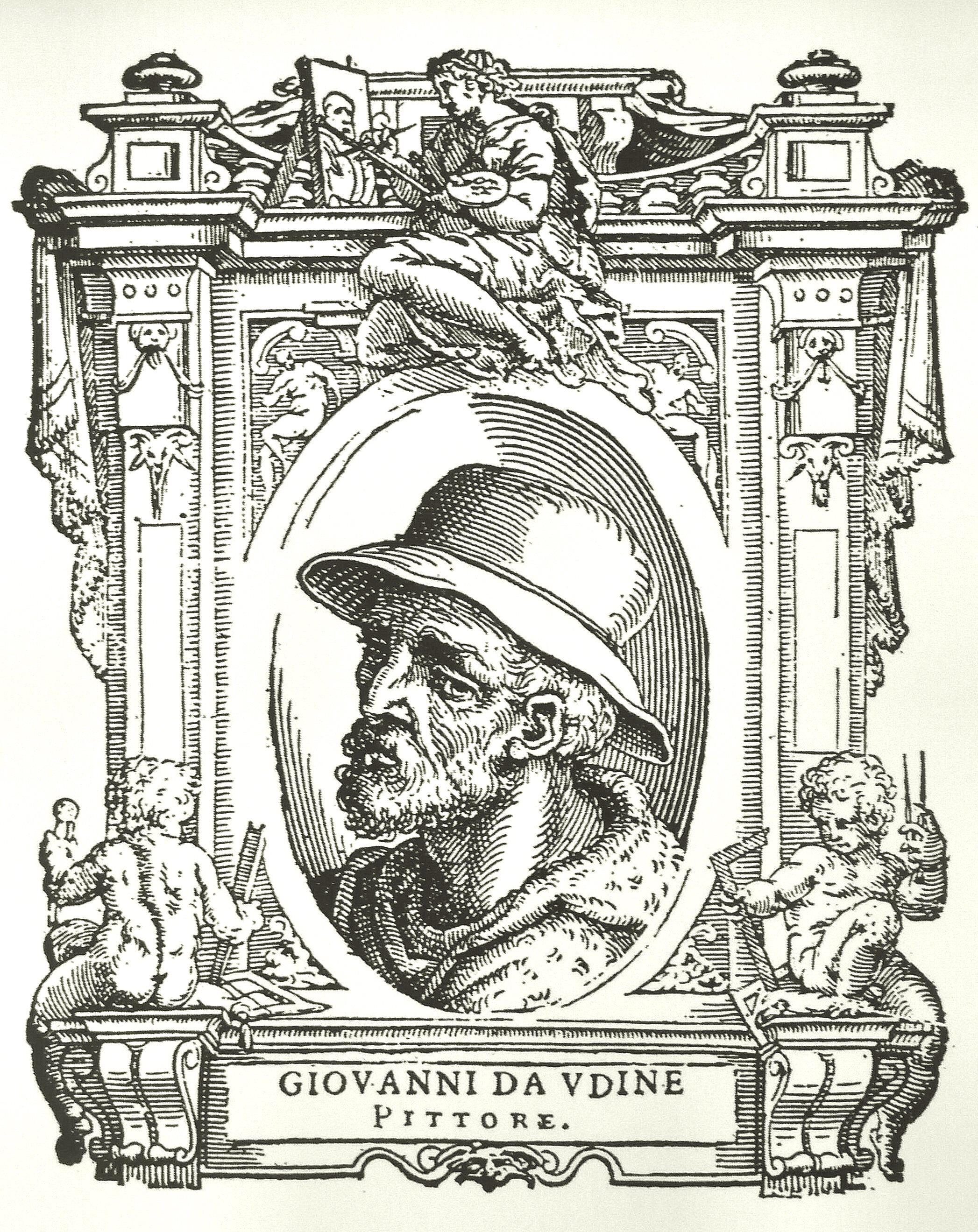
Portrait in Vasari's Vite

Giovanni Nanni, also Giovanni de' Ricamatori, better known as Giovanni da Udine (1487–1564), was an Italian painter and architect born in Udine. A painter also named Giovanni da Udine was exiled from his native city in 1472.

== Biography ==
As a student and assistant of Raphael, he was responsible for most of the "decorative" (i.e. non-narrative) elements of the major Raphaellesque projects in Rome, and he was a specialist in fresco and stucco grotesque decorations. These included the stucco work in the Loggia di Raffaello (Vatican, 1517–1519) and the heavy fruit-laden wreaths in the loggia di psiche in the Villa Farnesina. He also assisted in the construction of a few monumental fountains, which are now destroyed. He is also known for his drawings of birds and fruit.

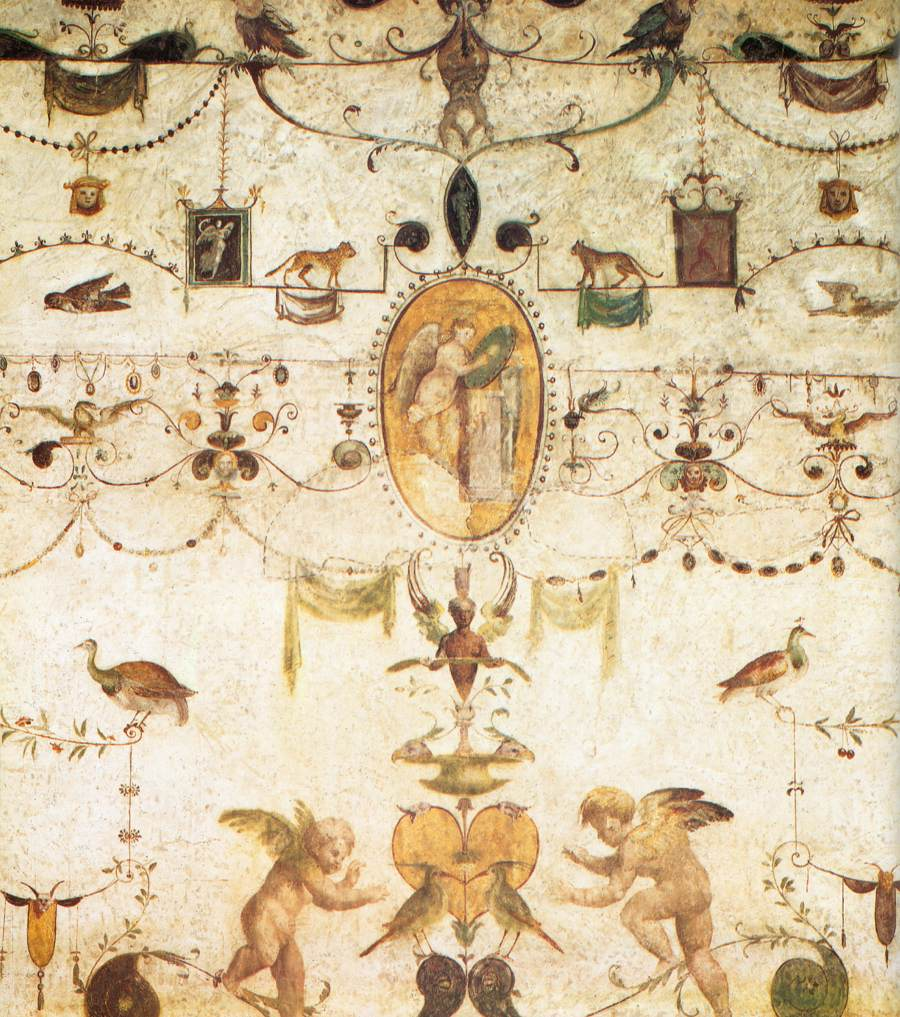
Decoration for Loggia of Cardinal Bibbiena

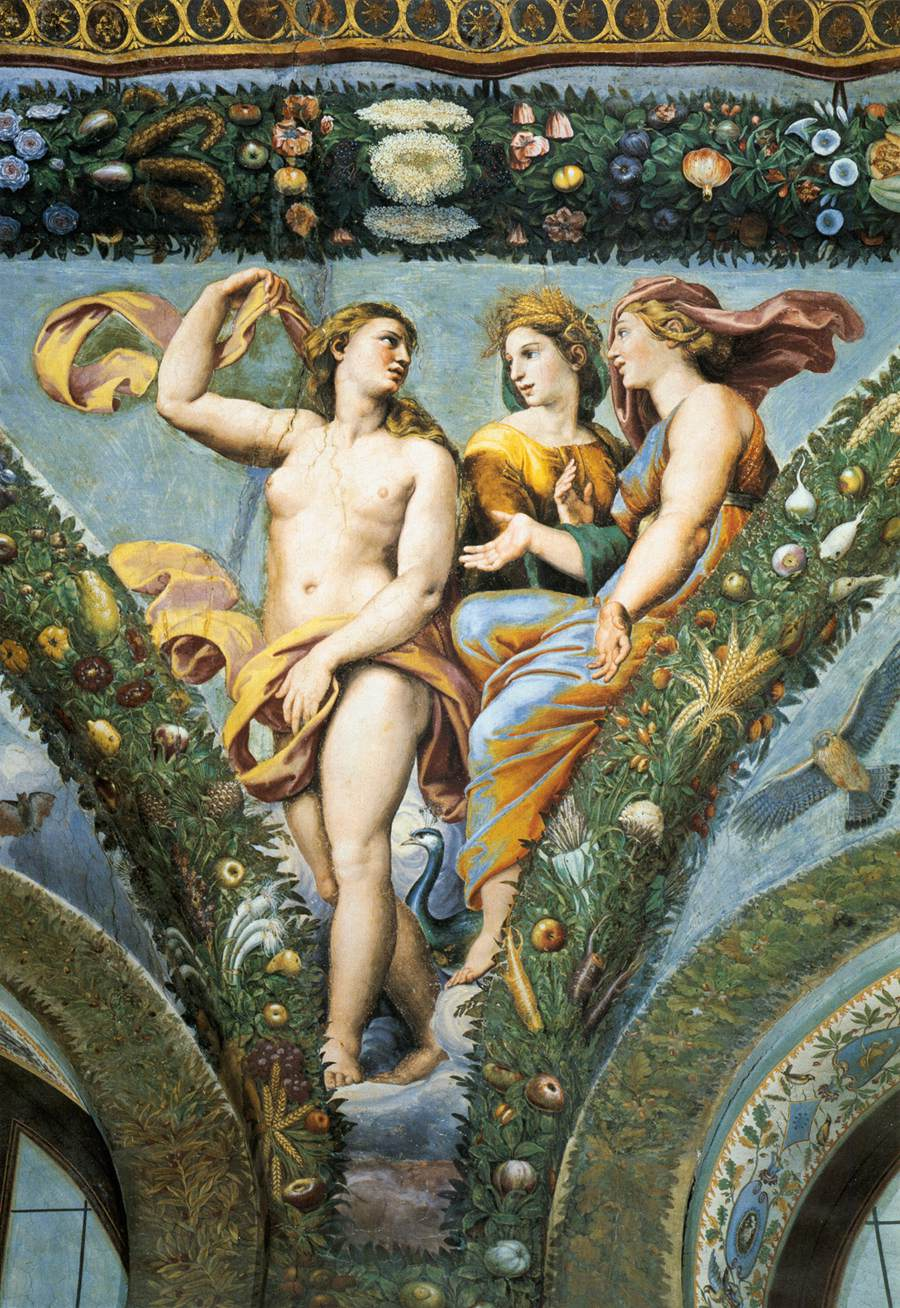
Loggia di Psiche frescoes

== Stucco discovery ==
One of his well-known discoveries is the art of Stucco, that Giovanni was the "new-founder" of after antiquity: occasioned by the discovery of the Domus Aurea, Nero's residence near the Colosseum: in the first year of the 16th century Raphael and his students went down "Mons Coelius" into tunnels that were formed to explore that area. With candles and torches they explored the caves and looked at the walls onto which were painted little heavy coloured figures that were named "grottesche (pl.), grottesca (s.)" because in the darkness, these images seemed like paint in ancient caves that in Italian was -and is- said like above. There was a strange "pictorial relief" onto which some of this "grottesche" were realised: it was Roman stucco, an important technique that the ancient Romans utilised to reproduce a marble effect, real marble was already too expensive by that time even for the Imperator (we have to think that there were all a "Domus" in marble, for a size as like as a range of KM 1.5 - 2 around Colosseum, it was the most famous residence of the Roman Empire).

After the death of Raphael, da Udine continued to work on projects initiated by his master, namely the Villa Madama in Rome. He continued his work until the sack of Rome (1527) when he departed to work in Florence, where he worked on the stuccoes in Sagrestia Nuova in San Lorenzo, and Venice, where he worked on the stucco decoration in the Palazzo Grimani, around 1540.

In Udine, he worked as an architect on the Torre dell'Orologio (Clock-Tower) and the Fontana di Piazza Nuova (Piazza Nuova Fountain). In Cividale, he helped in the construction of Santa Maria dei Battuti.

He returned to Rome in 1560 to work on the third floor of the Logge Vaticane, and died in this city in 1564.

== Gallery of Bird Drawings ==
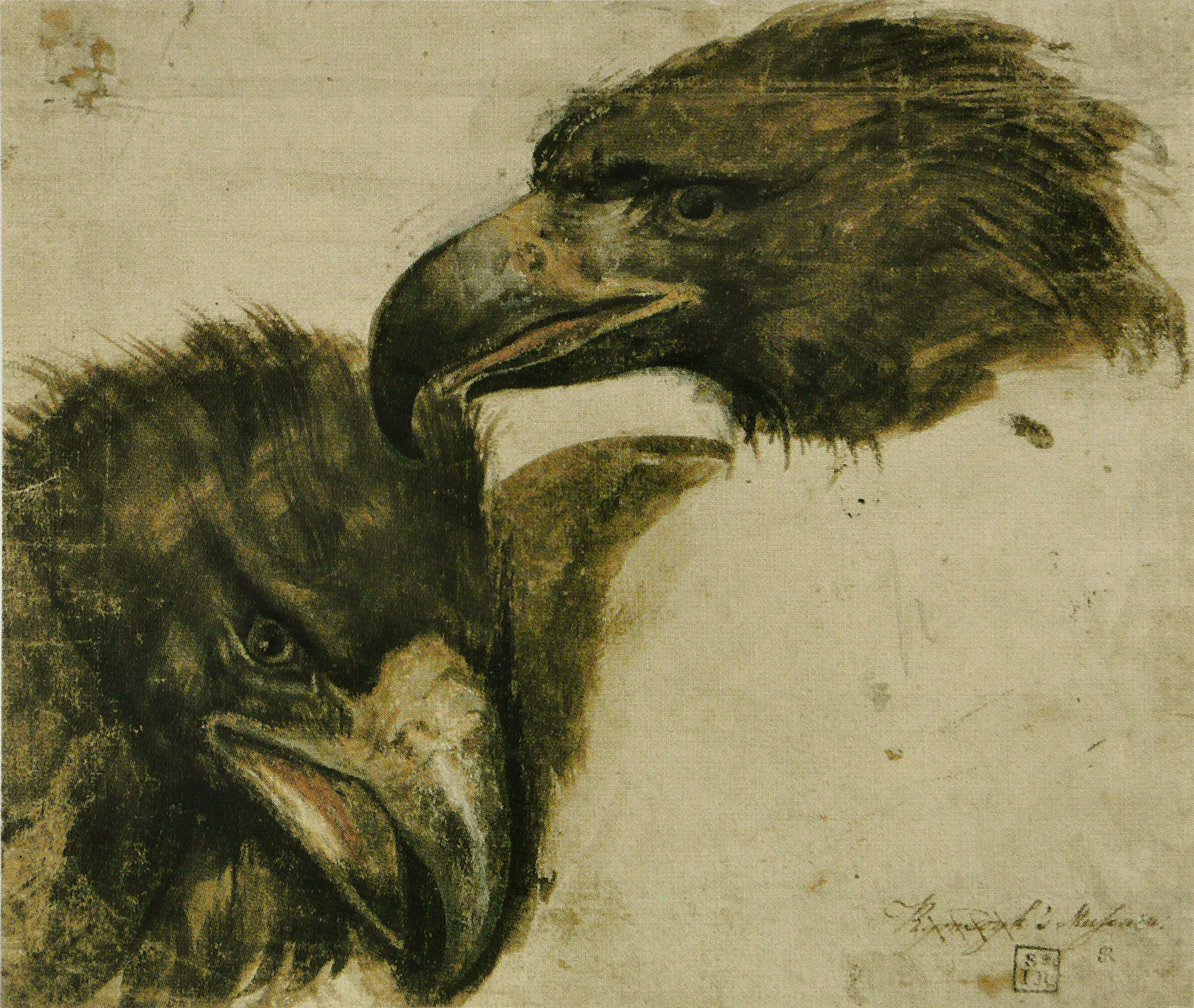
Eagle Heads

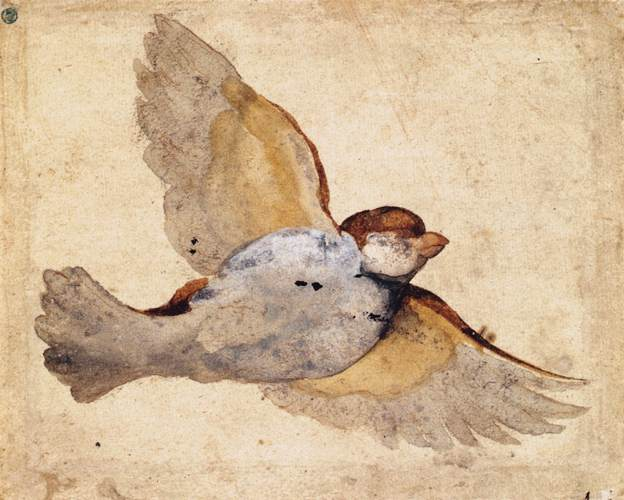
Flying Sparrow

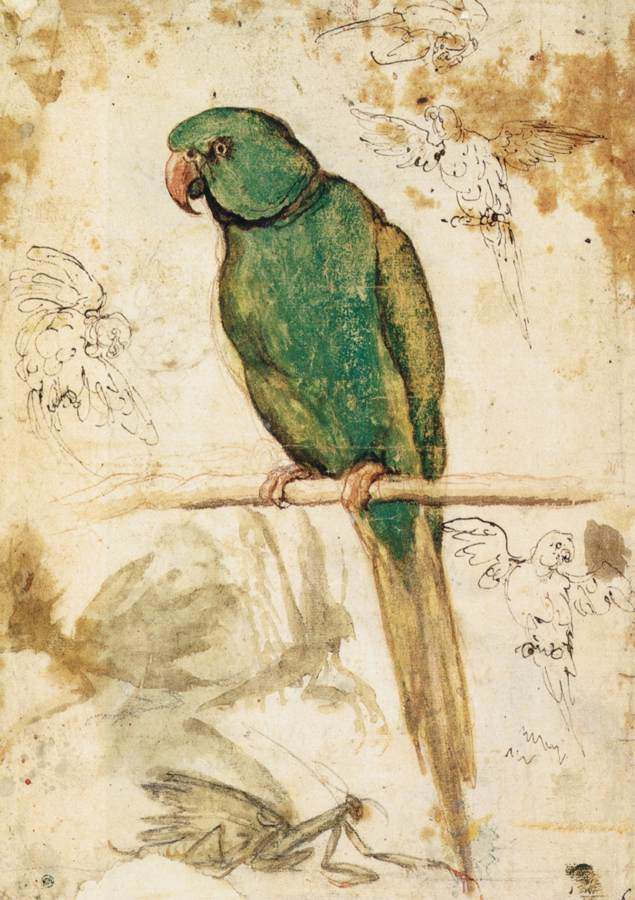
Parrot

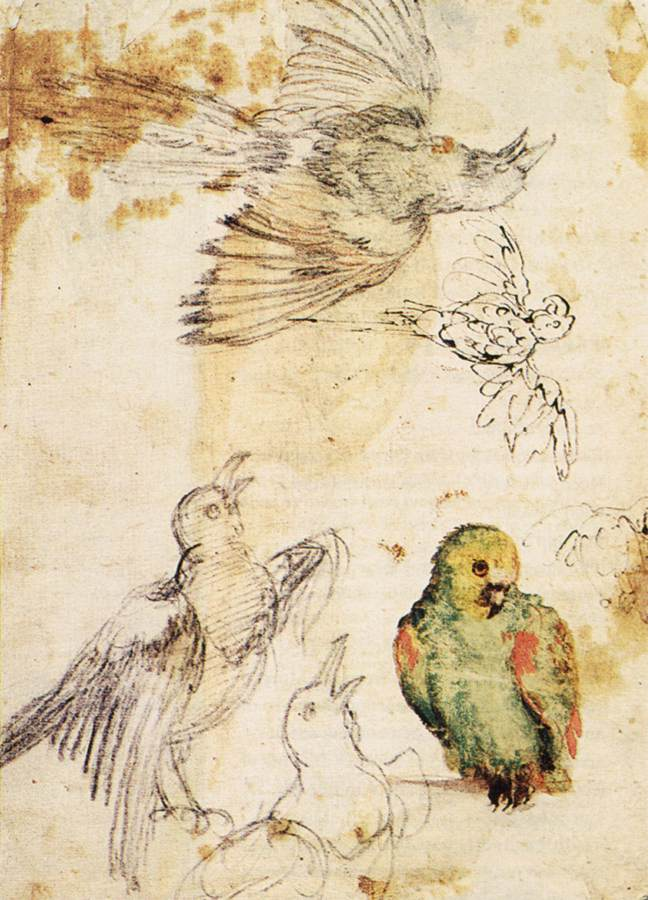
Parrot and other Birds

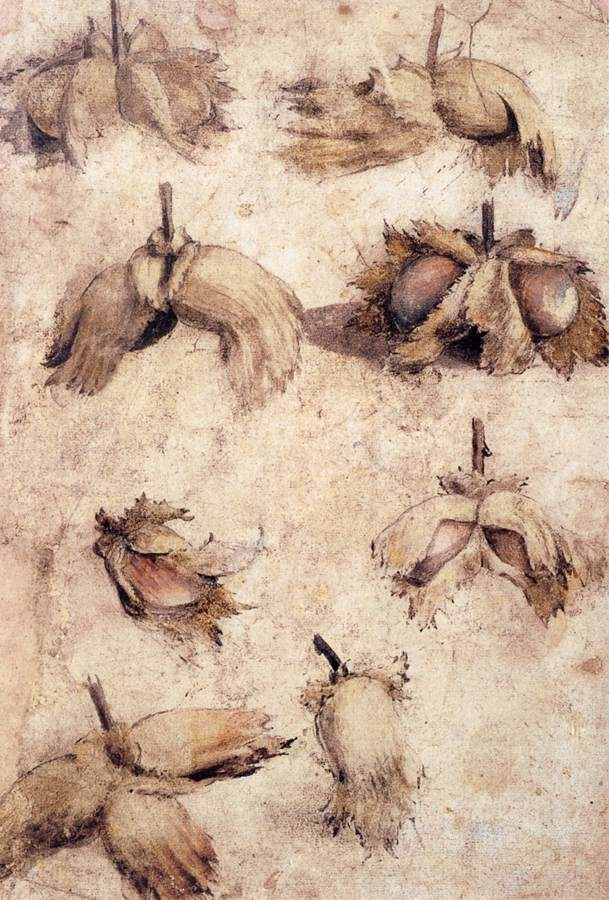
Nuts
