= Sebastián Raval =

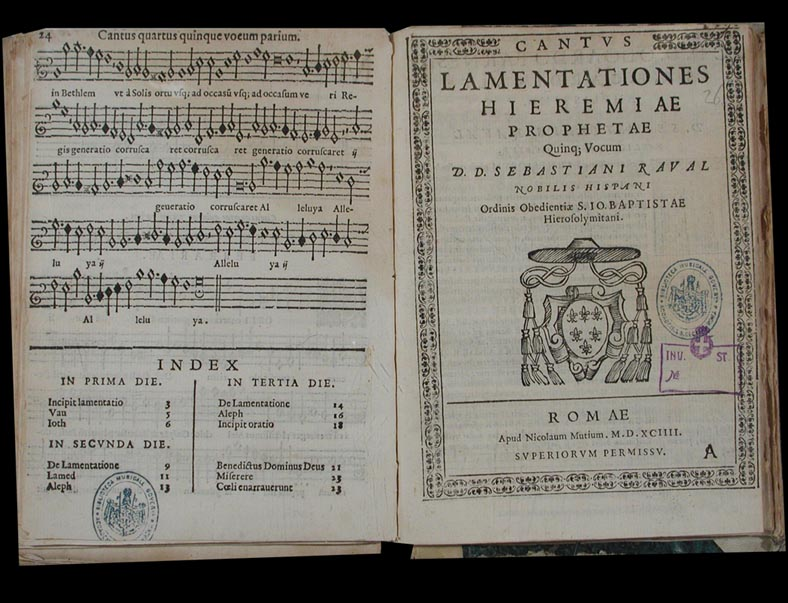
"Lamentationes Ieremiae prophetae quinque vocum". Romae 1594

Sebastián Raval (c. 1550 – 1604) was a Spanish composer of vocal and instrumental music. Born in Cartagena, he served as a soldier of the Army of Flanders in Flanders and Sicily. He joined the order of St. John of Jerusalem after being wounded in the siege of Maastricht.

He moved to Italy where he served as a musician in the court of Francesco Maria II della Rovere in Urbino, of the viceroy of Sicily, Bernardino de Cárdenas, and of the cardinals Peretti and Colonna in Rome.

In Rome, he declared himself the "best musician in the world", on account of which he was challenged to a musical contest first by Giovanni Maria Nanino and shortly afterwards by Francesco Soriano. Raval was defeated in both cases.

On 28 April 1595 he succeeded Luis Ruiz as the last Spanish maestro di cappella of the viceroyal chapel of the Spanish viceroys in Palermo.

In Sicily, he again challenged a musician, Achille Falcone, to a contest; it was first decided in Falcone's favour but, after some appeals, in Raval's. After Falcone's death in 1600, Antonio Falcone, father of Achille, published all the process of this musical duel in his Relazione del successo and took Raval and Falcone's pieces (the object of this competition) to print including several canons, madrigals, motets and ricercari. This edition of both Falcone and Raval's pieces is available in a modern edition.

Sebastián Raval died in Palermo in 1604.

In 2004, on the occasion of the 400th anniversary of his death, his birth city, Cartagena, paid homage to him with a concert performed on the viola da gamba by Pere Ros.

== Works ==
Raval composed religious polyphonic music, madrigals and instrumental ricercari. Raval's oeuvre has not yet been studied in depth. Only a few pieces have been published in modern times; the rest await the musicological research they deserve.

Sacred:

- Motectorum liber primus. 5 vv (Rome 1593)
- Lamentationes Hieremiae Prophetae. 5 vv Rome 1594
- Motecta Selecta organo Accommodata. 3-8 vv. org. (Palermo 1600)

Secular:

- Il Primo Libro de Madrigali. 5vv (Venice 1593)
- Il Pimo Libro di Canzonette. 4 VV (Venice 1593)
- Madrigali 3, 5, 8 vv (Rome 1595)
- Il Primo Libro di Ricercari (Palermo 1596)
- 2 Madrigals in "Infidi Lumi" (Palermo 1603) (lost)

== Editions ==
- "Achile Falcone-Madrigali, Mottetti e Ricercari" (Includes pieces of Raval). Leo S. Olschki Editore. (Firenze, 2000)
- "Sebastián Raval. 6 Canones (IL Primo Libro di Ricercari. Palermo 1596)" Sociedad Española de Musicología, Madrid 1985.
- "Sebastián Raval. Il Primo Libro di Ricercari a Quatro Voci Cantabili, per liuti, cimbali et viole d'arco. Palermo, 1596." Edited by Andrés Cea Galán. Patrimonio Musical Español, Fundación Caja Madrid (Madrid, 2008).
- "Three ensemble ricercars in four parts from Il primo libro de canzonette, 1593" edited by Milton Swenson.Ottawa: Dovehouse Editions, 1981.

== Recordings ==
- Da Pacem Domine Motete a 8 voces en dos coros a canon. La Lyra Hispana
