= Count Otto von Bray-Steinburg =

Bavarian diplomat and politician (1807–1899

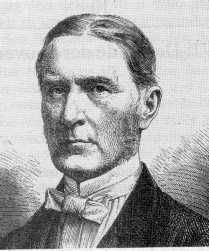

Otto Kamillus Hugo Gabriel Count von Bray-Steinburg (* 17 May 1807 in Berlin – † 9 January 1899 in Munich) was a Bavarian diplomat and politician. He was a son of the diplomat Count François Gabriel von Bray, who was from Rouen, France.

== Early life ==
Bray-Steinburg came from the old Norman family of Bray. He was a son of the Bavarian diplomat Count François Gabriel von Bray (originally from Normandy) and Baroness Sophia Catherine von Löwenstern. His main residence was the castle of Irlbach, south of Regensburg, but he also owned the nearby castles of Schambach and Steinburg.

Bray-Steinburg was taught in the Wilhelmsgymnasium in Munich and then studied law at the University of Göttingen and the Ludwig-Maximilians-Universität München.

== Career ==
He then served as a Bavarian diplomat in Vienna, Paris and Athens. In 1843 to 1859, Bray was, with interruptions, the Bavarian ambassador in Saint Petersburg. In 1846 to 1847, and again in 1848 to 1849, he was the Bavarian foreign secretary. During his second term, he also served as President of the Council of Ministers, a title equivalent to prime minister. In 1859 to 1860, Bray was the Bavarian ambassador in Berlin, and he then returned to Vienna as ambassador.

In 1870, King Ludwig II. appointed Bray again Minister of State of the Exterior and Council president. In that position, Bray led the Bavarian delegation for the negotiations of the Bavarian accession to the German Empire and managed to secure a privileged status for the Kingdom of Bavaria within the empire (Reservatrechte). The Kingdom of Bavaria was able to retain its own railways, postal service, diplomatic body and even its own army, which would fall under Prussian command only during times of war.

In 1871, Bray resigned since he was in opposition to the Kulturkampf. He then served again as the German Empire's ambassador in Vienna until 1897.

He was awarded Serbian Order of the Cross of Takovo.

== Personal life ==
He married Donna Ippolita Emanuela Dentice di Frasso, from Naples, daughter of Luigi Dentice, 6th Prince of Frasso and Donna Anna Maria Serra. They had issue:

- Countess Clara von Bray-Steinburg (b. 1848), who married Count Ludwig von Lerchenfeld-Köfering in 1867.
- Count Hippolyte von Bray-Steinburg (b. 1842), who married Countess Anna von Medem in 1871.
- Countess Gabriele von Bray-Steinburg (b. 1841), who married Count Johann Douglas von Thurn-Valassina-Como Vencelli in 1863.
- Countess Marie von Bray-Steinburg (b. 1839), who married Count Giulio Figarolo di Gropello in 1858.

Count von Bray died on 9 January 1899 in Munich.

== Orders and decorations ==
- Kingdom of Bavaria:
  - Grand Cross of the Royal Merit Order of Saint Michael, 1852
  - Grand Cross of the Merit Order of the Bavarian Crown, 1861
  - Knight of the Royal Order of Saint Hubert, 1871
  - Cross of Honour of the Order of Ludwig, 1882
- (Austrian Empire) (Kingdom of Hungary) Austria-Hungary:
  - Grand Cross of the Imperial Order of Leopold, 1868
  - Grand Cross of the Royal Hungarian Order of Saint Stephen, 1873
- Kingdom of Prussia:
  - Knight of the Order of the Red Eagle, 1st Class, 28 April 1860
  - Knight of the Royal Order of the Crown, 1st Class with Enamel Band of the Red Eagle Order, 28 January 1871
- Sweden-Norway: Commander Grand Cross of the Royal Order of the Polar Star, 24 May 1844

Political offices
Preceded by Baron Friedrich August von Gise	Minister-President of Bavaria; 26 May 1846 – 13 February 1847	Succeeded by Georg Ludwig von Maurer
Preceded by Count Klemens von Waldkirch	Minister-President of Bavaria; 29 April 1848 – 18 April 1849	Succeeded by Baron Karl Ludwig von der Pfordten
Preceded by Chlodwig, Prince of Hohenlohe-Schillingsfürst	Minister-President of Bavaria; 8 March 1870 – 25 June 1871	Succeeded by Friedrich von Hegnenberg-Dux
