= House of Dentice =

Family name

House of Dentice Casa Dentice
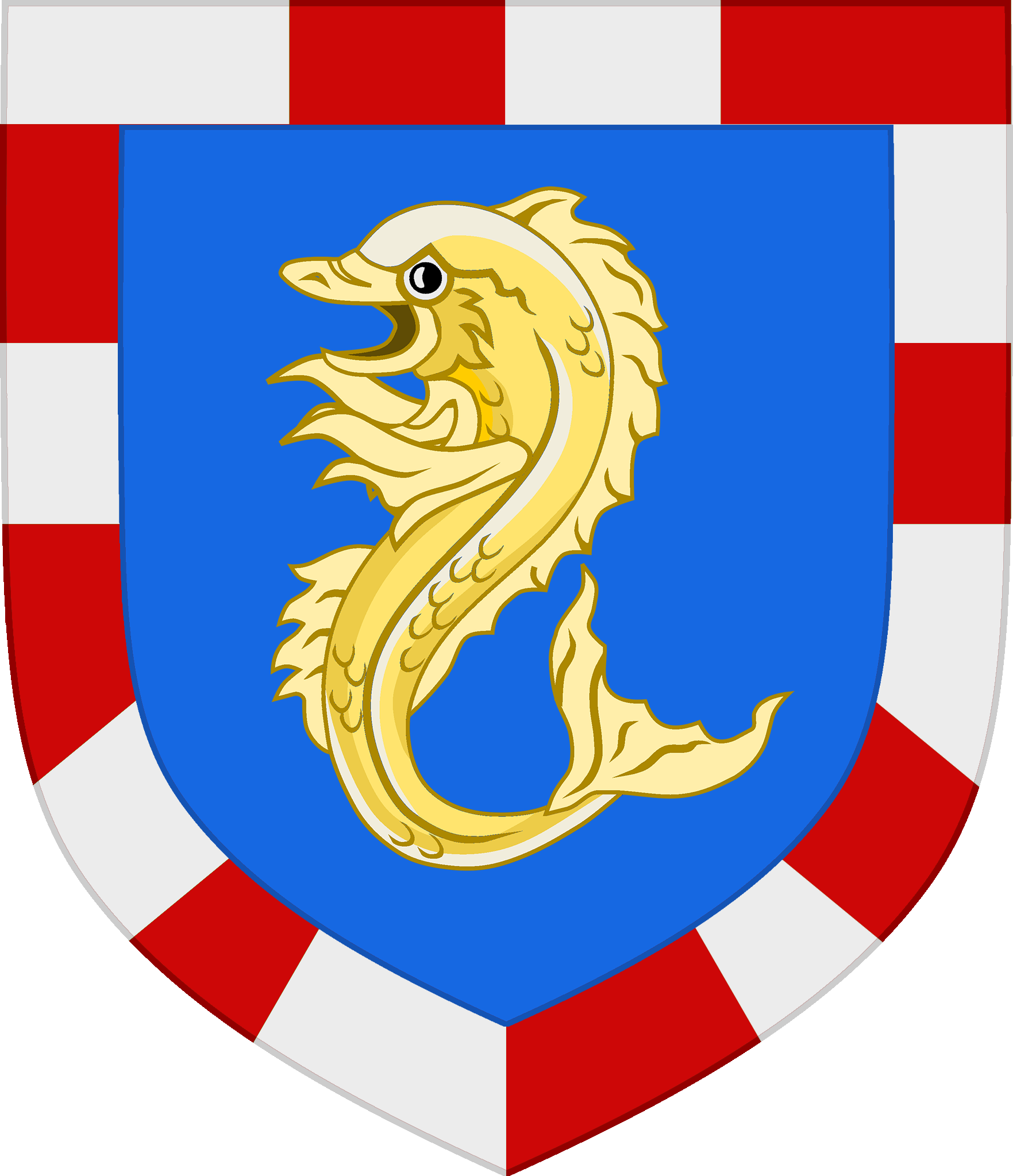
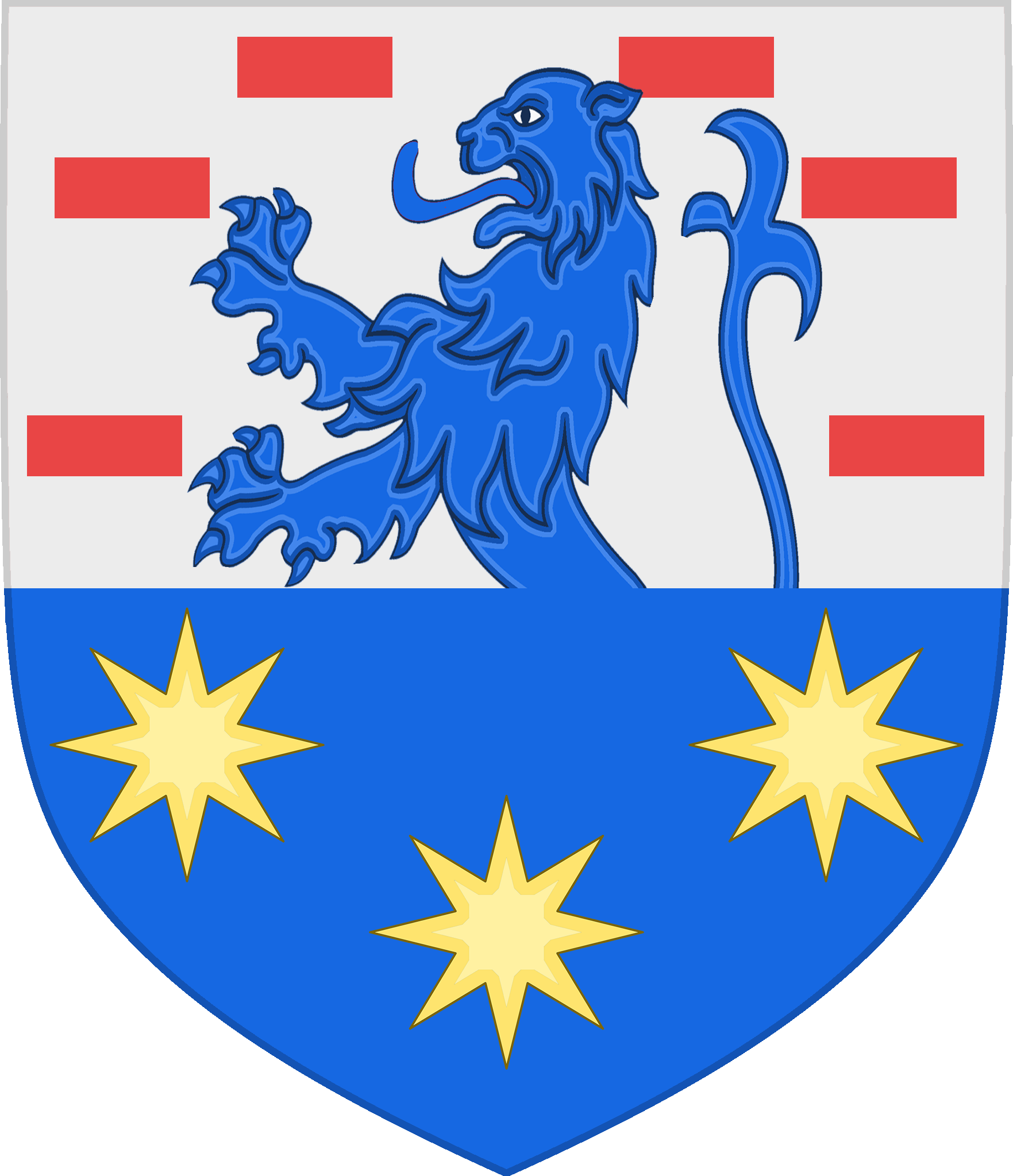
- Country: Kingdom of Italy
- Founded: 13th century
- Titles: Lord of Viggiano; Marquis delle Stelle; Prince of Arecco; Baron of Fornella; Count of Santa Maria Ingrisone; Duke of Accadia; Prince of Frasso

The House of Dentice is an old Italian noble family, whose members occupied many important ecclesiastical and political positions.

== History ==
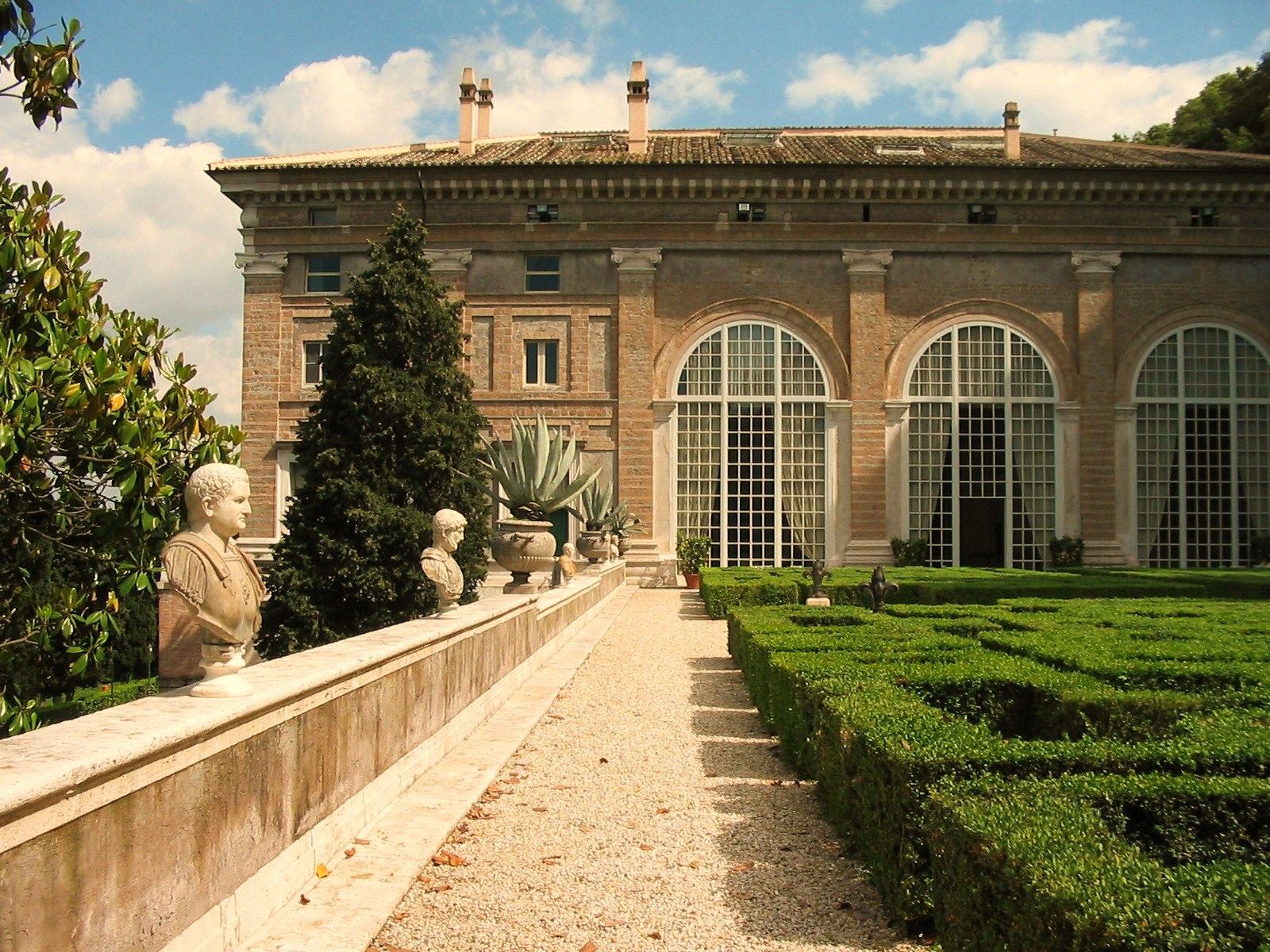
Villa Madama in Rome

Originally from Amalfi, in 1200 she was listed among the feudal lords of the Kingdom of Naples. They moved from Amalfi, first to Sorrento, where they was admitted to the patriciate of the Seggio di Porta, and then to Naples, where they enjoyed the honours of the seats of Nilo and Capuano. In 1565, they were admitted to the Order of Malta.

In 1925, Count Carlo Dentice di Frasso, and his American wife, the former Dorothy Cadwell Taylor (later known as Countess Dorothy di Frasso), acquired Villa Madama in Rome and restored it, later donating it to the State, while the Castello Dentice di Frasso in San Vito dei Normanni continues to be their property.

The family split into two branches:

- Dentice del Pesce (now Dentice Massarenghi, Princes of Frasso)
- Dentice delle Stelle (or Dentice of Accadia)

=== Notable members ===
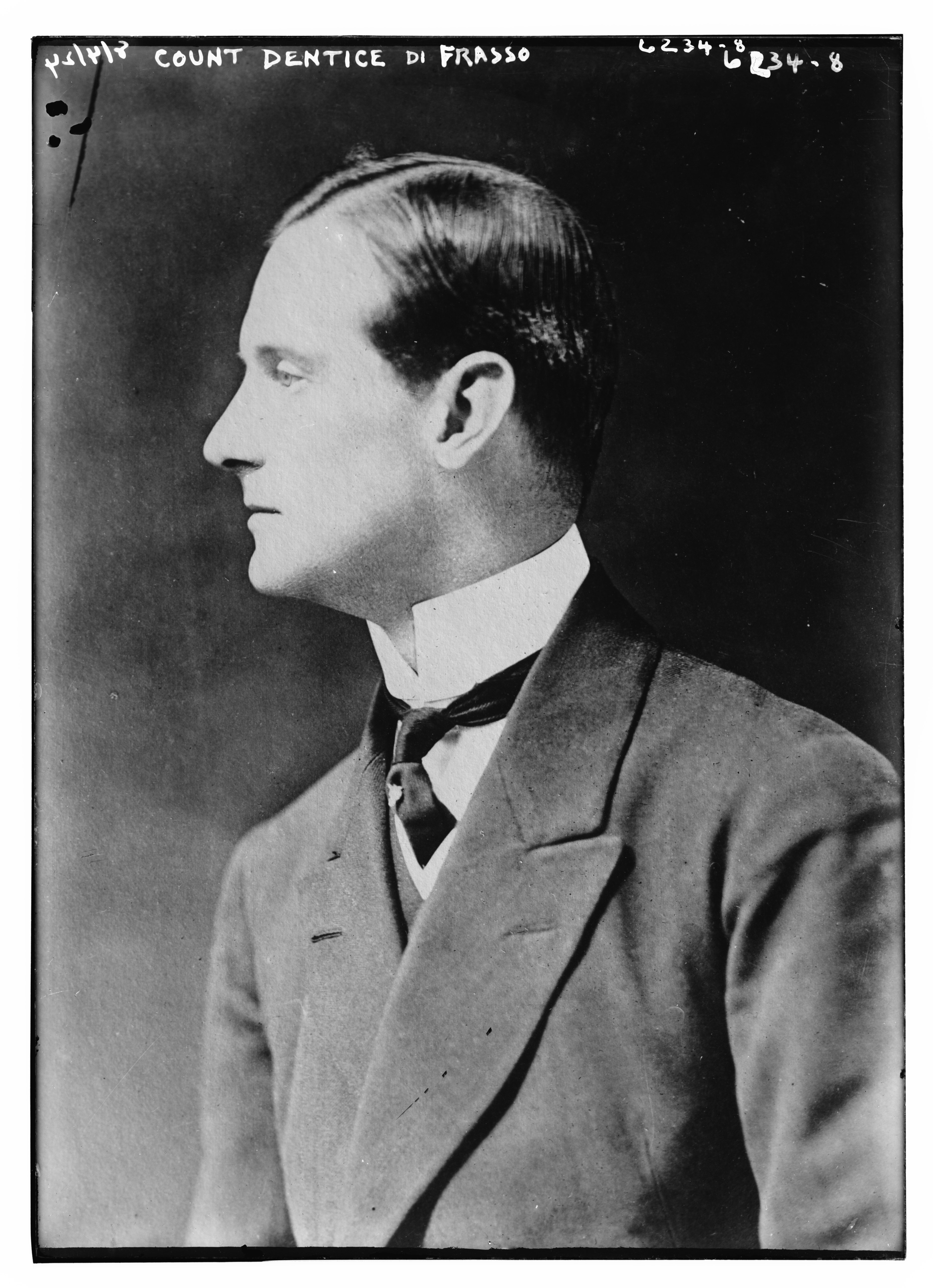
Count Carlo Dentice di Frasso

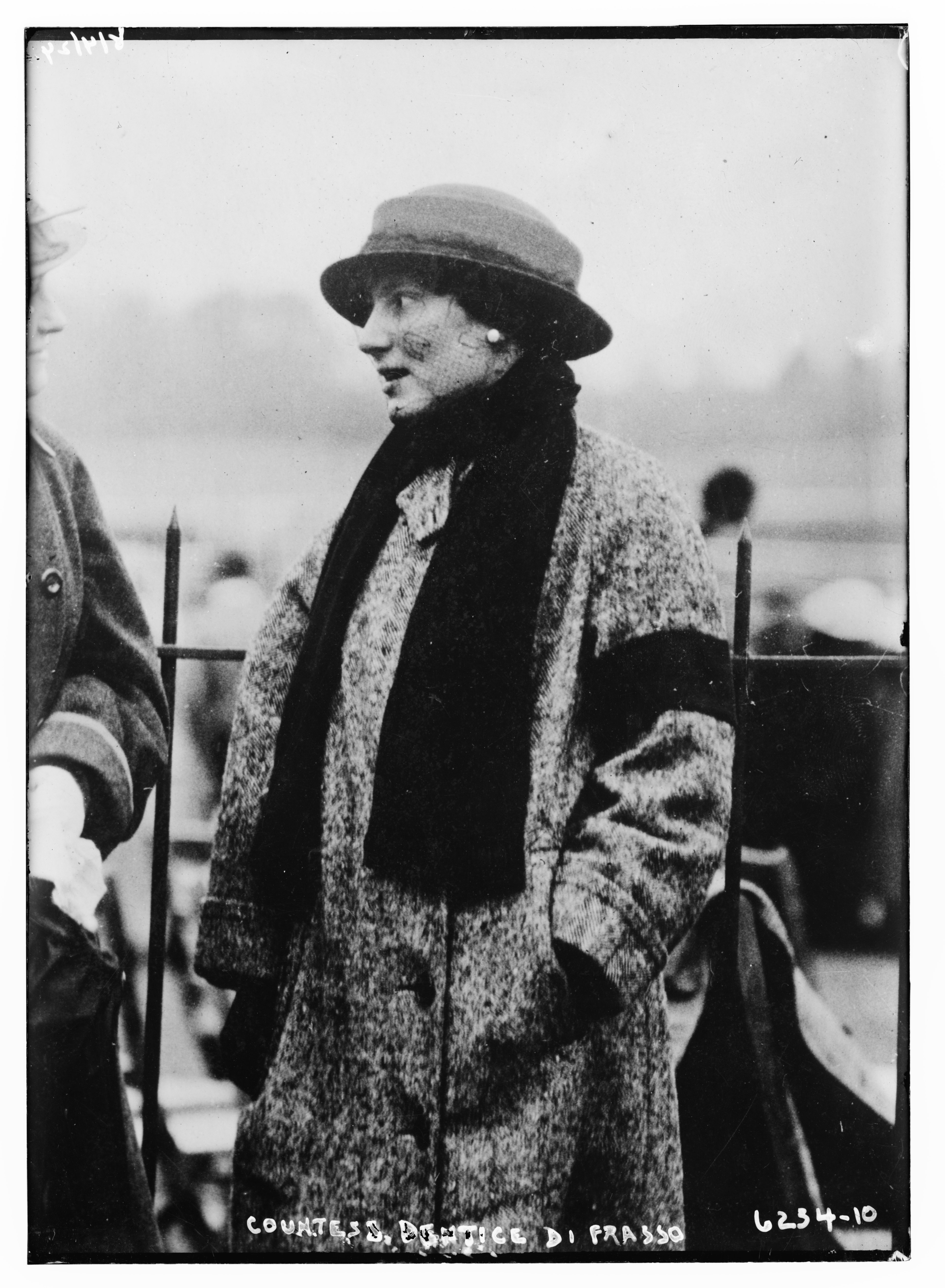
Countess Dentice di Frasso

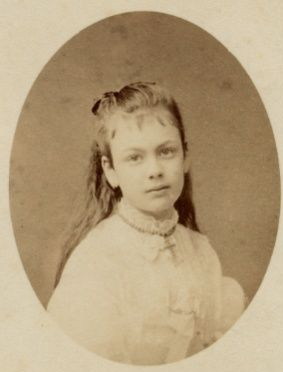
Marianna Dentice, daughter of Ernesto, c. 1870

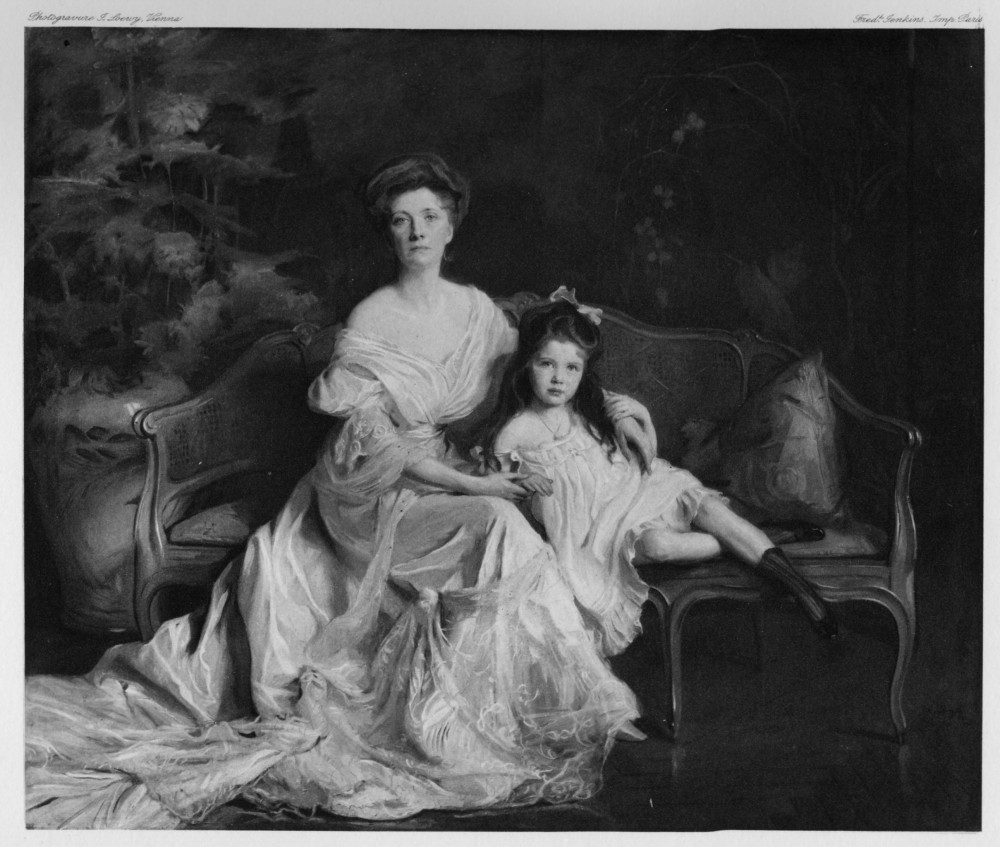
Portrait of Countess Karl von Schönborn-Buchheim (née Teresa Dentice di Frasso) and her daughter Countess Franziska Schönborn-Buchheim, by Philip de László, 1906

The family produced a number of illustrious musicians and music theorists active between the 16th and 17th centuries, including:

- Luigi Dentice (c. 1510–1566), a music theorist and author of the treatise, Duo dialoghi della musica, from Naples.
- Fabrizio Dentice (c. 1539–1581), a composer, singer, and lute player from Naples.
- Scipione Dentice (1560–c. 1632), a musician from Naples.

The family produced a number of prominent politicians, including:

- Ernesto Dentice di Frasso (1825–1886), a Senator in 1876.
- Luigi Dentice di Frasso (1861–1947), son of Ernesto, Senator from 1908.
- Francesco Dentice di Accadia (1873–1944), a Senator in 1939.
- Alfredo Dentice di Frasso (1873–1940), son of Ernesto, Admiral, entrepreneur, Deputy in 1929 in the legislature of the Kingdom of Italy, and Senator in 1939.
- Francesco Dentice di Accadia (1873–1944), a Senator in 1939.
- Carlo Dentice di Frasso (1876–1945), a Member of Parliament from 1913.

== Dentice family titles ==
=== Lords of Viggiano ===
- Antonio, 1st Lord of Viggiano (15th century)
- Luigi, 2nd Lord of Viggiano
- Giovanni Bernardino, 3rd Lord of Viggiano (d. 1481)
- Adriana, 4th Lady of Viggiano (1479–1549)

Extinction of the male line

=== Marquesses delle Stelle (1633) ===
- Paolo, 1st Marquis (1581–1638)
- Francesco, 2nd Marquis (1625–1677)
- Domenico, 3rd Marquis (1651–1717)
- Francesco, 4th Marquis, became 1st Prince of Arecco (1703–1779)

Passage of the title in the Princes of Arecco

=== Princes of Arecco (1733) ===
- Francesco, 1st Prince of Arecco (1703–1779)
- Domenico, 2nd Prince of Arecco (1760–1831)

Extinction of the male line

- Francesco, 3rd Prince of Arecco, 8th Count of Santa Maria Ingrisone (1873–1944), (titles claimed in 1929)
- Aldo, 4th Prince of Arecco, 9th Count of Santa Maria Ingrisone (b. 1926)

=== Barons of Fornella, Counts of Santa Maria Ingrisone (1705) and Dukes of Accadia (1791) ===
- Carlo, 1st Baron of Fornella (1583–1668)
- Fabrizio, 2nd Baron of Fornella (1629–1695)

Sale of the fiefdom of Fornella

- Carlo, 1st Count of Santa Maria Ingrisone (1664–1720)
- Fabrizio, 1st Duke of Accadia, 2nd Count of Santa Maria Ingrisone (1701–1765)
- Carlo, 2nd Duke of Accadia (1723–1782)
- Fabrizio, 3rd Duke of Accadia (1764–1826)
- Carlo, 4th Duke of Accadia (1783–1859)
- Fabrizio, 5th Duke of Accadia (1802–1878)
- Giustiniana, 6th Duchess of Accadia (1833–1911)

Extinction of the male line

=== Princes of Frasso (1725) ===
The branch originates with Placido, a descendant of Giovanni Giacomo, a descendant of Antonio, 1st Lord of Viggiano.

- Placido, 1st Prince of Frasso (1669–1751)
- Gerardo, 2nd Prince of Frasso (1695–1777)
- Placido, 3rd Prince of Frasso (1725–1785)
- Gerardo, 4th Prince of Frasso (1761–1811)
- Michele, 5th Prince of Frasso (1789–1812)
- Luigi, 6th Prince of Frasso, brother of the previous (1791–1850)
- Ernesto, 7th Prince of Frasso (1825–1886)
- Luigi, 8th Prince of Frasso (1861–1947)
- Ernesto, 9th Prince of Frasso (1886–1978)
- Luigi, 10th Prince of Frasso (1924–2000)
- Giuliano, 11th Prince of Frasso (b. 1968), nephew of the previous
- Gianluigi Pio, 12th Prince of Frasso (b. 2004)

== See also ==
- List of marquesses in Italy
- List of dukes in the nobility of Italy
