= William Francisco Spotswood =

American druggist and politician

William Francisco Spotswood (February 16, 1827 – April 13, 1895) was an American druggist and politician who served as president of the city council and school board of Petersburg, Virginia.

== Early life ==
Spotswood was born on February 16, 1827 in Petersburg, Virginia. He was the third, but eldest surviving, son of Dandridge Spotswood (1787–1849) and Catharine Brooke (née Francisco) Spotswood (1801–1863). Among his siblings were Joseph Edwin Spotswood, Rosaline Brooke (née Spotswood) Strudwick (wife of Frederick Nash Strudwick, son of Edmund Strudwick), and Eliza Robertson Spotswood.

His paternal grandparents were Sarah "Sallie" (née Rowzie) Spotswood and Capt. John Spotswood Jr. (Note: Capt. John Spotswood, Jr. (1748–1800), the second child of Col. John Spotswood, Sr. and Mary (née Dandridge) Spotswood (a cousin of Martha Washington; née Dandridge), was educated at Eton College in England (along with his brother Brig.-Gen. Alexander Spotswood). After his father's death in 1756, his aunt, Anne Catherine (née Spotswood) Moore and uncle, Col. Bernard Moore, were John and Alexander's guardians. Brig.-Gen. Alexander Spotswood of the 2nd Virginia Regiment married Elizabeth Washington, daughter of Augustine Washington, Jr, President George Washington's older half-brother.) a soldier in the American Revolutionary War who fought at the Battle of Brandywine and the Battle of Germantown, where he was wounded and taken prisoner. His paternal great-great grandparents were Virginia Governor Alexander Spotswood (himself the great-grandson of John Spotswood and wife Rachel (née Lindsay) Spotswood), (Note: Rachel Lindsay was a direct descendant of David Lindsay, 1st Earl of Crawford, and Elizabeth Stewart (daughter of King Robert II of Scotland).) and Elizabeth Butler Brayne (a godchild of James Butler, 2nd Duke of Ormond). His maternal grandparents were Catherine (née Fauntleroy) Brooke and Peter Francisco, a Portuguese-born American blacksmith who fought for the Continental Army during the American Revolutionary War.

== Career ==
Spotswood attended the Petersburg Classical Institute intending to study medicine at the University of Virginia, but the death of his father in September 1849, changed his plans, and he became a druggist and apothecary. He then became a successful merchant, and was considered "trained more and better druggists than any man in the State." For over ten years, he served as treasurer of the Petersburg Gas Company, and for twenty years was president of the Aqueduct Company, succeeding the Justice of the Virginia Supreme Court William T. Joynes. During the Civil War, he worked in hospital service with Dr. Porcher and Dr. Hines of the medical staff of the Confederate States Army. He also saw active duty, and was stationed at Battery Five on the river the week prior to the First Battle of Petersburg on June 9, 1864.

After a lengthy period as a working trustee, he served as chairman of the Petersburg City School Board. In addition, he served as president of the City Council and acting Mayor of Petersburg, Virginia.

A Presbyterian and a devoted Mason, he served as Deputy Grand Master. He was also an honorary member of the Mechanics' Benevolent Association.

== Personal life ==
Spotswood was married to Isabella Matoaca Dunlop (1848–1922), a daughter of James Dunlop and Isabella Lenox (née Maitland) Dunlop. Together, they were the parents of:

- Dandridge Spotswood (1872–1939), an industrial engineer; he married Philadelphia socialite Katherine "Kitty" Wolff, the daughter of Dr. Lawrence Wolff in 1904. They divorced and she married Count Erwein von Schönborn-Buchheim in 1911. They too divorced in 1924 and she married Baron Eugène von Rothschild in 1925.
- Isabella Maitland Spotswood (1873–1877), who died young.
- Alexander Spotswood (1875–1939), who married Edna Mabel Mallagh, a daughter of David Patrick Mallagh, Jr. and Maria Isabelle de Roceo, in 1903.
- James Dunlop Spotswood (1877–1882), who died young.
- William Francisco Spotswood (1879–1880), who died young.
- Catherine Francisco Spotswood (1881–1932), who died unmarried.
- Colin McKenzie Dunlop Spotswood (1883–1922), who married Ann McIlwaine “Nancy” Martin, a daughter of Archibald Graham McIlwaine Martin and Kate Boothe.
- Martha Bogle Dunlop Spotswood (1885–1981), who died unmarried.

Spotswood died on April 13, 1895 in Petersburg and was buried at Blandford Cemetery there.
