= Kitty Rothschild =

American socialite (1885–1946)

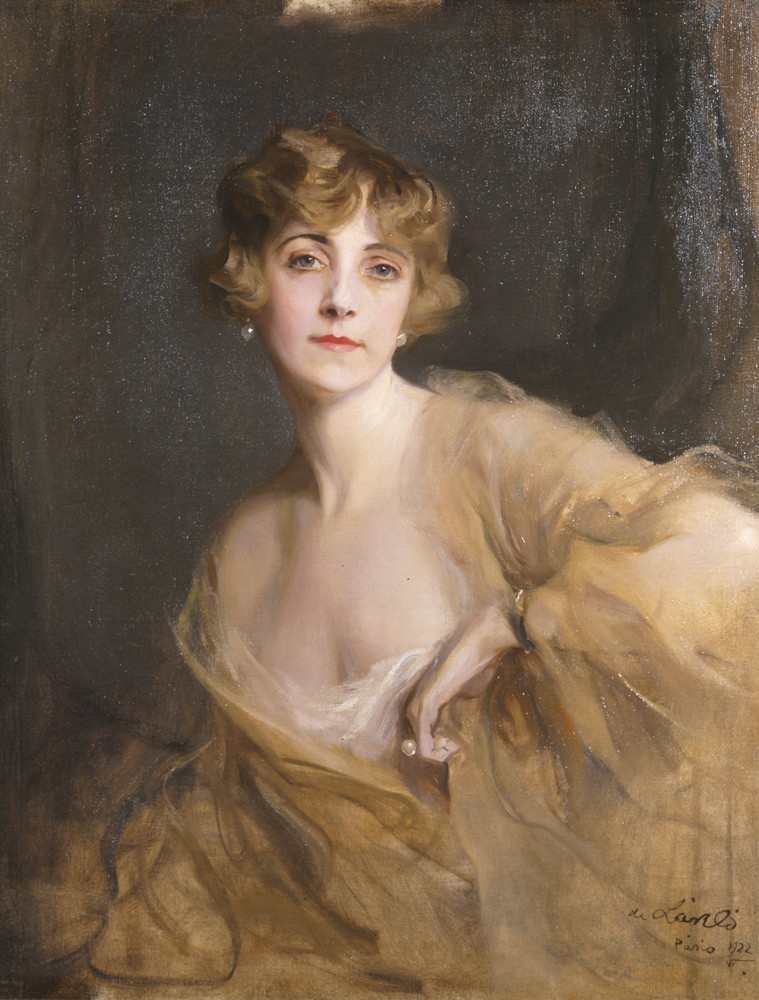
Portrait of Kitty, by Philip de László, 1922

Katherine "Kitty", Baroness Eugène von Rothschild (née Wolff, formerly Countess Erwein von Schönborn-Buchheim and Mrs. Dandridge Spotswood; 13 March 1885 – October 9, 1946) was an American socialite. She was chosen by noted Parisian dress designers as one of the world's ten best-dressed women.

== Early life ==
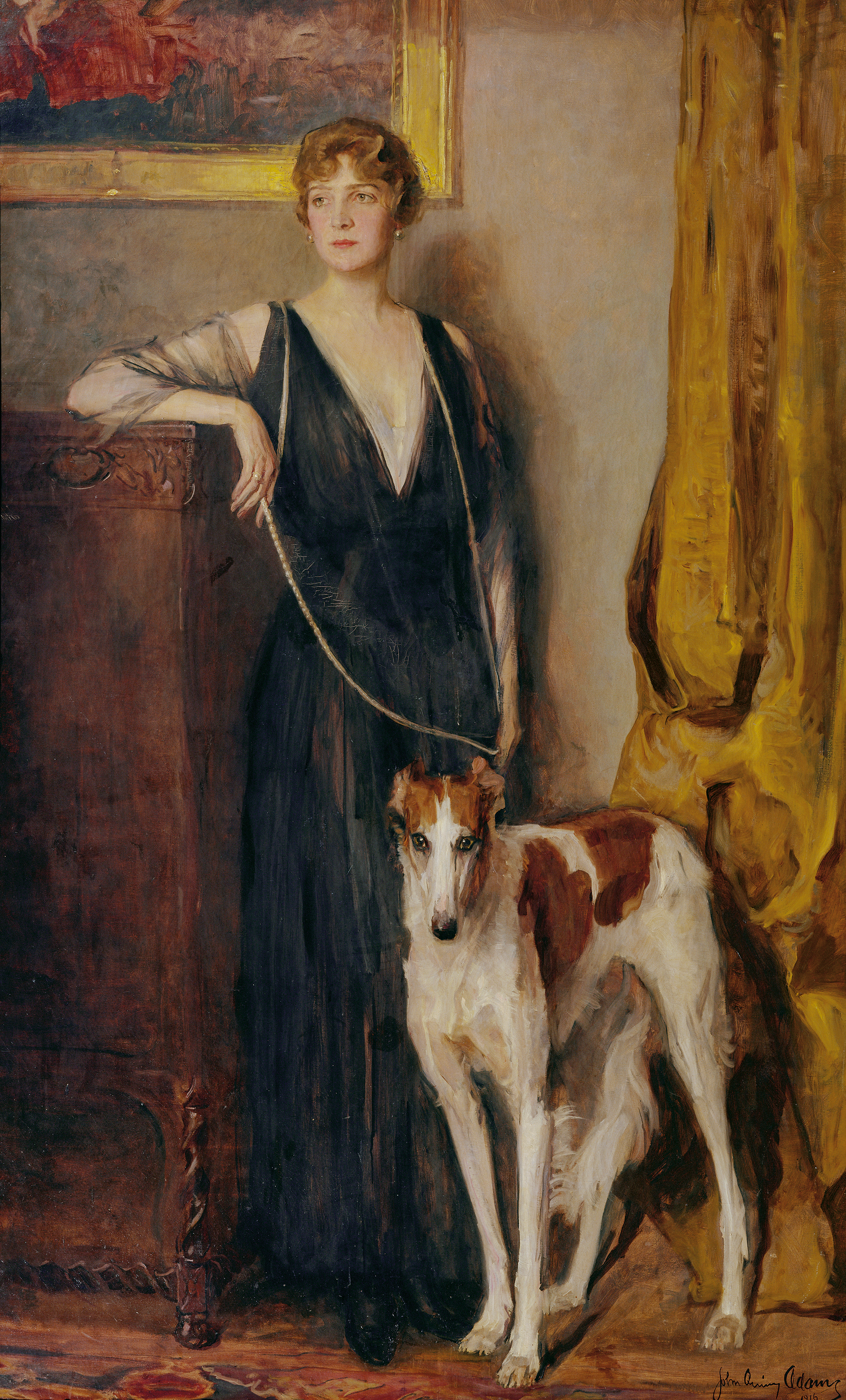
Portrait of Kitty, by John Quincy Adams, 1916

Katherine "Kitty" Wolf was born in Philadelphia, Pennsylvania on 13 March 1885. She was a daughter of the Dr. Lawrence Wolff (1844–1901), a physician in Philadelphia, and Mary Olivia (née Keys) Wolff (1864–1897), who married in 1883. (Note: "Interviewed on a visit to New York in 1938, the Baroness denied a report that her grandfather had been an Austrian baron and that she herself had been a lady-in-waiting in the Austrian court. Other fanciful stories had been told of her early days in Europe.") Her father was an 1880 graduate of Jefferson Medical College. Her maternal grandparents were Dr. Roger Keys and the former Kate Olive Cathcart.

She studied music in Munich.

== Personal life ==
After her time in Munich, she eloped in Manhattan on 20 June 1904 to Dandridge Spotswood (1872–1939), a New Yorker of Virginian ancestry. An industrial and mining engineer, he was the son of William Francisco Spotswood and Isabella Matoaca (née Dunlop) Spotswood. The young couple lived for a period in New York before she moved to Europe, attaining a high social position in Paris and London as well as in New York. The marriage ended in divorce.

=== Second marriage ===
On October 24, 1911, she married Count Erwein von Schönborn-Buchheim (1871–1937) at the Church of St. Honoré d'Eylau in Paris. (Note: The witnesses for the bridegroom were Count Charles Schönborn-Buchheim and Prince Emile von Fürstenberg, and for the bride Rear Admiral William T. Swinburne, U.S.N., retired, and Maj. Thomas Bentley Mott, the American Military Attaché.) He was the youngest son of Erwein, 4th Count of Schönborn-Buchheim and Countess Franziska von Trauttmansdorff-Weinsberg. (Note: Countess Franziska von Trauttmansdorff-Weinsberg (1844–1898), was a daughter of Prince Ferdinand Joachim von Trauttmansdorff-Weinsberg (a grandson of Prince Ferdinand von Trauttmansdorff) and Princess Anna of Liechtenstein (a daughter of Prince Karl of Liechtenstein, himself a grandson of Prince Karl Borromäus of Liechtenstein).) Although she was raised Protestant, she became a Roman Catholic in order to marry Count Erwein. Among his siblings were Countess Anna Marie von Schönborn-Buchheim (wife of Prince Gottfried Karl Joseph of Hohenlohe-Langenburg), Countess Franziska von Schönborn-Buchheim (wife of Prince Konrad of Hohenlohe-Schillingsfürst), Countess Irma Caroline Gabrielle von Schönborn-Buchheim (wife of Maximilian Egon II, Prince of Fürstenberg), and Friedrich Karl, 5th Count of Schönborn-Buchheim (who married Donna Teresa Dentice di Frasso, a daughter of Count Don Ernesto, 7th Prince Dentice di Frasso, and Countess Luisa Chotek von Chotkowa und Wognin).

=== Third marriage ===
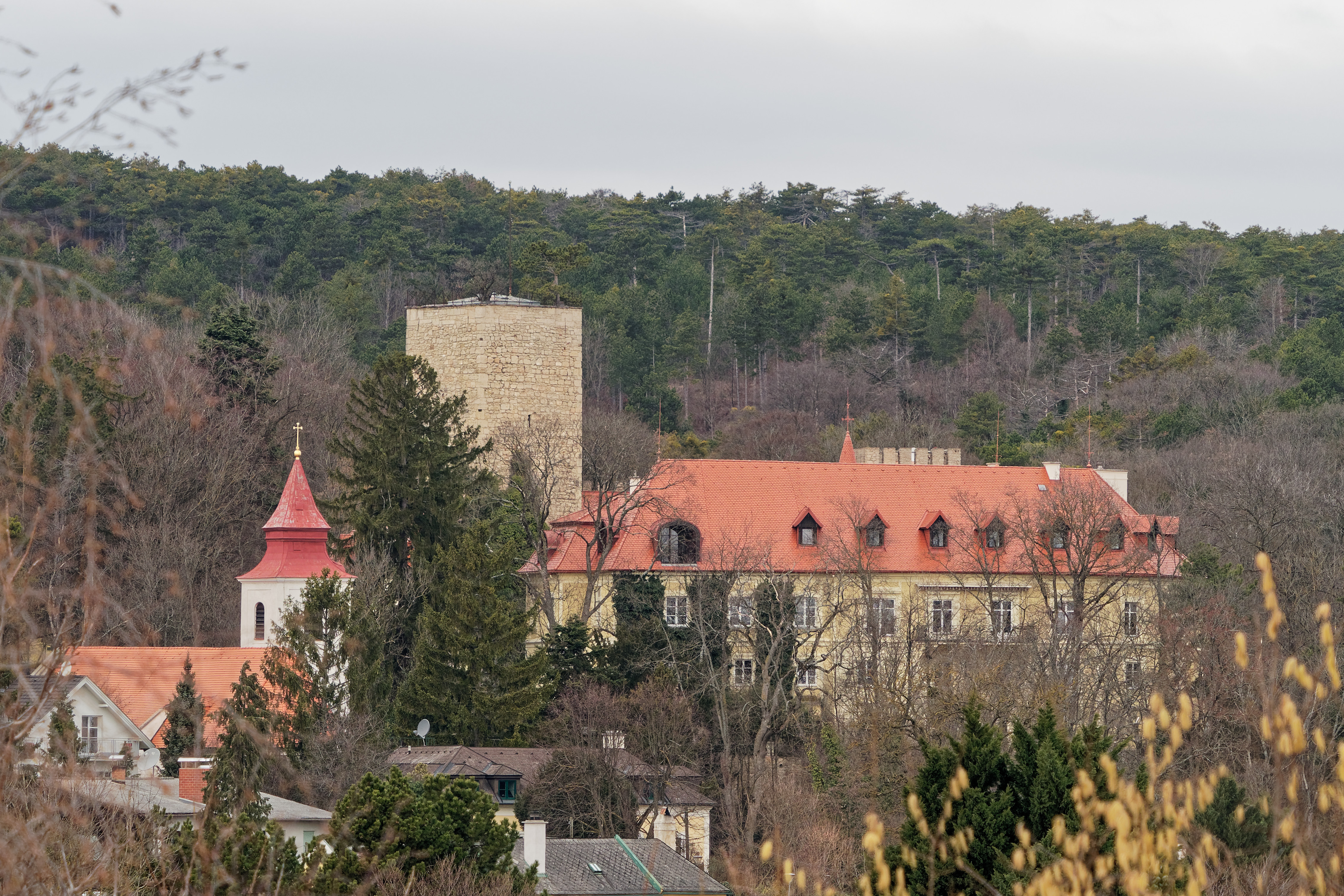
Schloss Enzesfeld, 2020

On 28 April 1925, after living together in Paris following her 1924 divorce, she married Baron Eugène von Rothschild (1884–1976), a younger son of Albert Salomon von Rothschild and Bettina Caroline de Rothschild, members of the Austrian branch of the family. "Upon her marriage into the Rothschild family, it was reported that she had embraced the Jewish faith."

A friend of Wallis Simpson, after Edward VIII abdicated he traveled to Schloss Enzesfeld, Kitty and Eugène's castle in Enzesfeld near Vienna, staying there for three months until Simpson's divorce was finalized so they could marry.

In 1940, shortly after the beginning of World War II, Kitty and Eugène left France for the United States. In 1941, they settled at Still House, a Georgian Colonial style home set on a 44-acre estate formerly owned by Paul D. Cravath in Locust Valley on Long Island. Kitty "often assisted financially various charitable and patriotic causes. In 1940 she presented shoes to an entire French regiment."

The marriage to Baron Eugène was happy, but childless. The Baroness died of a cerebral hemorrhage at 62 at Still House on October 9, 1946. After her death, Eugène remarried the British actress Jeanne Stuart on 21 December 1952. They both lived in New York City and Long Island but eventually left to live in Monte Carlo where he died in 1976.
