= Porto Judeu =

- Civil parish
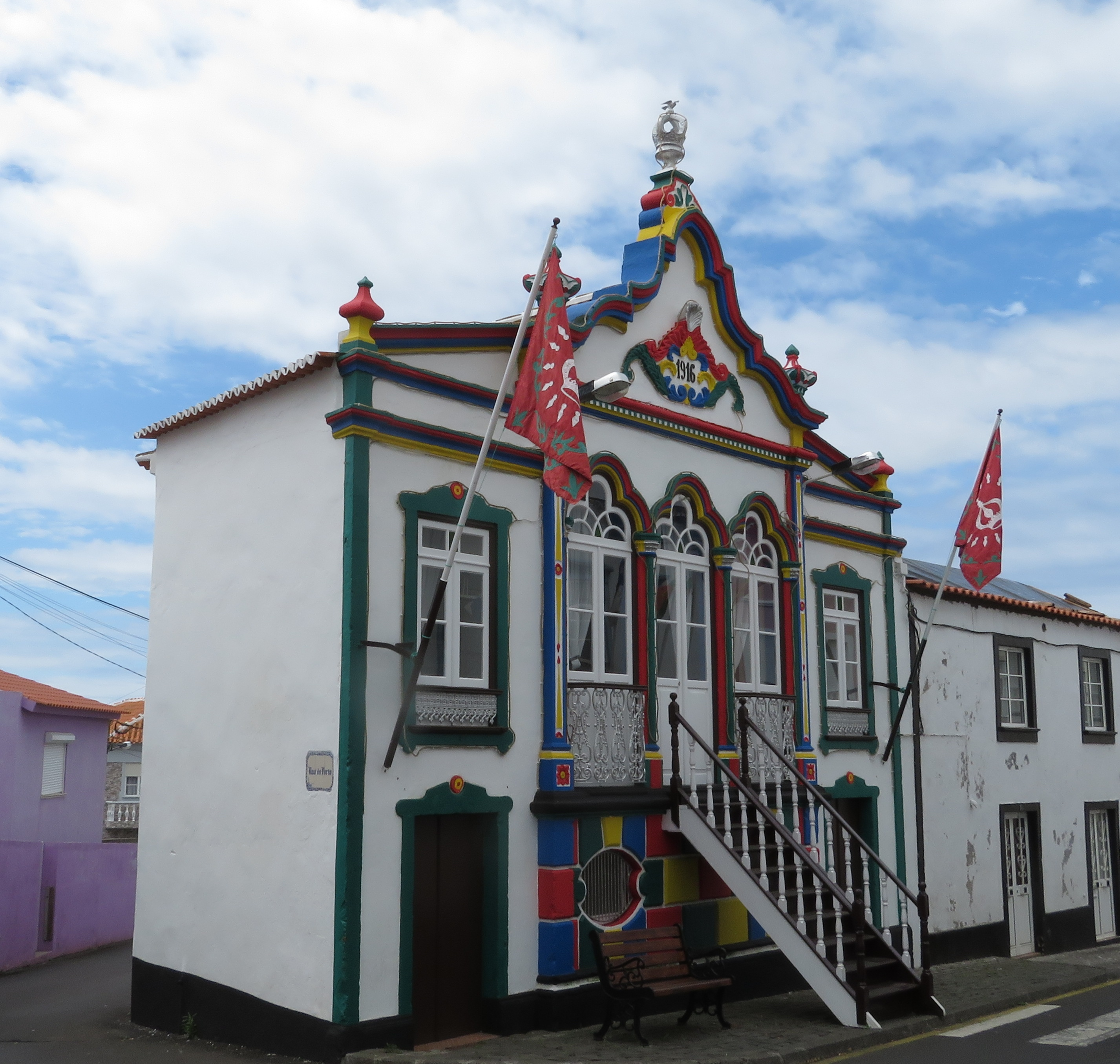
- Chapel of Holy Spirit

- Location in the Azores Porto Judeu (Terceira)
- Coordinates: 38°38′59″N 27°7′0″W
- Country: Portugal
- Auton. region: Azores
- Island: Terceira
- Municipality: Angra do Heroísmo
- Established: Settlement: fl.1450 Parish: c. 1470; Town: 12 February 1502 (519 years)

Area
  - Total: 30.27 km^{2} (11.69 sq mi)
- Elevation: 33 m (108 ft)

Population (2011)
  - Total: 2,501
  - Density: 82.62/km^{2} (214.0/sq mi)
- Time zone: UTC−01:00 (AZOT)
  - Summer (DST): UTC+00:00 (AZOST)
- Postal code: 9700-368
- Area code: 292
- Patron: Santo António
- Website: www.portojudeu.pt

Porto Judeu (pronounced [ˈpoɾ.tu ʒu.ˈdew]) is a freguesia ("parish") in the municipality of Angra do Heroísmo on the island of Terceira in the Azores. The population in 2011 was 2,501, in an area of 30.27 km^{2}. It contains the localities Banda da Canada, Cruz, Cruz do Canário, Porto Judeu de Baixo, Porto Judeu de Cima, Refugo and Ribeira do Testo.

In Portuguese, Porto Judeu means "Jewish Port". In the past other common names were Porto Judeu de Santo António ("Jewish Port of Saint Anthony") and Porto do Judeu ("Port of the Jew").

== Notable people ==
Peter Francisco - American patriot and soldier in the American Revolutionary War
