= Alexander Spotswood (1746–1818) =

Brigadier-General Alexander Spotswood (October 16, 1746 – December 10, 1818) was an American soldier who fought with the 2nd Virginia Regiment and married a niece of President George Washington.

== Early life ==
Spotswood was born in Mecklenburg County, Virginia on October 16, 1746. He was a son of Col. John Spotswood Sr. (1725–1756), who served in the French and Indian War, and Mary West (née Dandridge) Spotswood (1725–1795), a cousin of Martha Washington. From his parents marriage, his siblings included Capt. John Spotswood Jr. (who married Sarah "Sallie" Rowzie; grandparents of William Francisco Spotswood), Mary Spotswood (who married Peter W. Randolph, a grandson of William Randolph II and Benjamin Harrison IV), and Ann Catherine Spotswood (who married Col. Lewis Burwell). After his father's death, his mother married John Hodges Campbell of Jamaica in 1765; he later deserted her.

His paternal grandparents were Anne Butler (née Brayne) Spotswood (a godchild of the 2nd Duke of Ormond) and Maj.-Gen. Alexander Spotswood, the Colonial Governor of Virginia from 1710 to 1722. His paternal aunt, Anne Catherine Spotswood, married Col. Bernard Moore, Esq., of Chelsea, King William County, Virginia. His maternal grandparents were Capt. William Dandridge II (brother of John Dandridge) and Unity West Dandridge (a daughter of landowner Capt. Nathaniel West).

Alexander and his elder brother John were educated at Eton College in England. After their father's death in 1756, his aunt, Anne Catherine (née Spotswood) Moore and uncle, Col. Bernard Moore, became the boys guardians.

== Career ==
By 1772, Spotswood possessed 150,000 acres of land in the three Virginia counties of Orange, Spotsylvania, and Culpeper. The land was an entailed estate that had descended to him from his grandfather, Governor Spotswood. He also owned an iron foundry established by his grandfather.

Spotswood fought in the American Revolutionary War, commanding the 2nd Virginia Regiment from early 1776 through late 1777, and again from 1781 through 1782, being promoted from the rank of Major up to Brigadier-General. He commanded at the Battle of Brandywine and the Battle of Germantown, where his brother was badly wounded and taken prisoner and presumed dead. Consequently in late 1777, Spotswood sent in his resignation to Gen. George Washington, having made a contract with his brother when they entered the army, that, if either should be killed, the survivor should return home to care for the two families. Upon learning that his brother was still alive and a prisoner in Philadelphia, Alexander requested to return to his command in the Army. Washington, however, replied that he could not be reinstated in his former command because many officers had been promoted after his resignation.

During Gen. Benedict Arnold's invasion in 1780, Spotswood commanded a brigade of militia called out to oppose him. He was later appointed Brigadier-General and served from 1781 to the end of the war, commanding a legion raised in Virginia. Spotswood spent a great deal of his fortune on the Army, paying to clothe his entire regiment in Philadelphia from his own pocket.

== Personal life ==
In 1769 Spotswood was married to Elizabeth Lewis "Bettie" Washington (1749–1814), a daughter of Anne (née Aylett) Washington (the daughter and coheiress of William Aylett of Westmoreland County, Virginia) and Augustine Washington, Jr. (the older half-brother of President George Washington). Together, they were the parents of thirteen children, including:

- Alexander Elliott Spotswood (1769–1842), a Judge; he married his second cousin, Elizabeth Alexander "Bettie" Lewis, a daughter of Fielding Lewis II (eldest son of Fielding Lewis and, his second wife, Elizabeth Washington, sister of George Washington) and Ann "Nancy" Alexander, in 1789.
- John Augustine Spotswood (1771–1808), a Commander in the U.S. Navy.
- Ann Spotswood (1773–1774), who died young.
- Mary Randolph Spotswood (1775–1803), who married Francis Taliaferro Brooke, later Chief Justice of Virginia, in 1791. After her death, he married Mary Champe Carter in 1804.
- Ann Washington Burwell "Nancy" Spotswood (1779–1822), who married Baldwin Taliaferro.
- Elizabeth Butler Spotswood (1781–1805), who died young.
- George Augustine Washington Spotswood (1783–1844), a Lt. in the War of 1812; he married his cousin, Lucy Rowzie Spotswood, in 1805.
- Henrietta Brayne Spotswood (1786–1860), who married her first cousin, Bushrod Washington, a son of William Augustine Washington, in 1806.
- Martha Ann Maria Spotswood (1790–1826), who died unmarried.
- William Lawrence McCarty Spotswood (1791–1871), who married Catherine Anne Jones, a daughter of Ambrose P. Jones, in 1822; he lived at Sedley Lodge, in Orange County, Virginia.

Spotswood died in Spotsylvania County, Virginia (Note: Spotsylvania County, Virginia was established in 1721 from parts of Essex, King and Queen, and King William counties and was named in Latin for his grandfather, Lieutenant Governor of Virginia Alexander Spotswood.) on December 10, 1818. He was interred in Spottswood Cemetery, Barren County, Kentucky.
