= Peter Francisco =

American blacksmith and soldier (1760–1831)

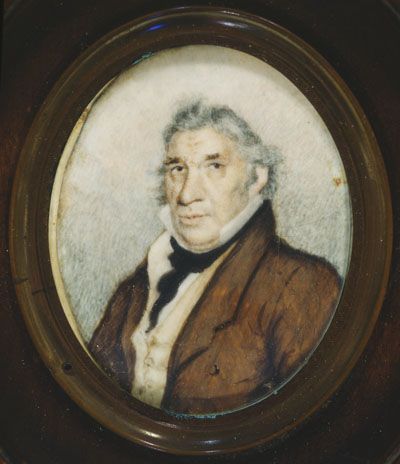
- Miniature portrait of Francisco
- Born: Pedro Francisco; July 9, 1760; Porto Judeu, Terceira, Kingdom of Portugal
- Died: January 16, 1831 (aged 70); Richmond, Virginia, U.S.
- Resting place: Shockoe Hill Cemetery
- Other names: Virginia Giant, Giant of the Revolution, Virginia Hercules
- Occupations: Blacksmith, soldier, sergeant-at-arm
- Height: 6 ft 6 in (198 cm)
- Spouses: Susannah Anderson; Catherine Fauntleroy Brooke; Mary Grymes West
- Children: 5
- Relatives: William Francisco Spotswood (grandson); Steven Pruitt (great-great-great-great-great-great-grandson)

Peter Francisco (born Pedro Francisco; July 9, 1760 – January 16, 1831) was a Portuguese-born American blacksmith and soldier best known for his service in the Continental Army during the American Revolutionary War.

== Early life ==
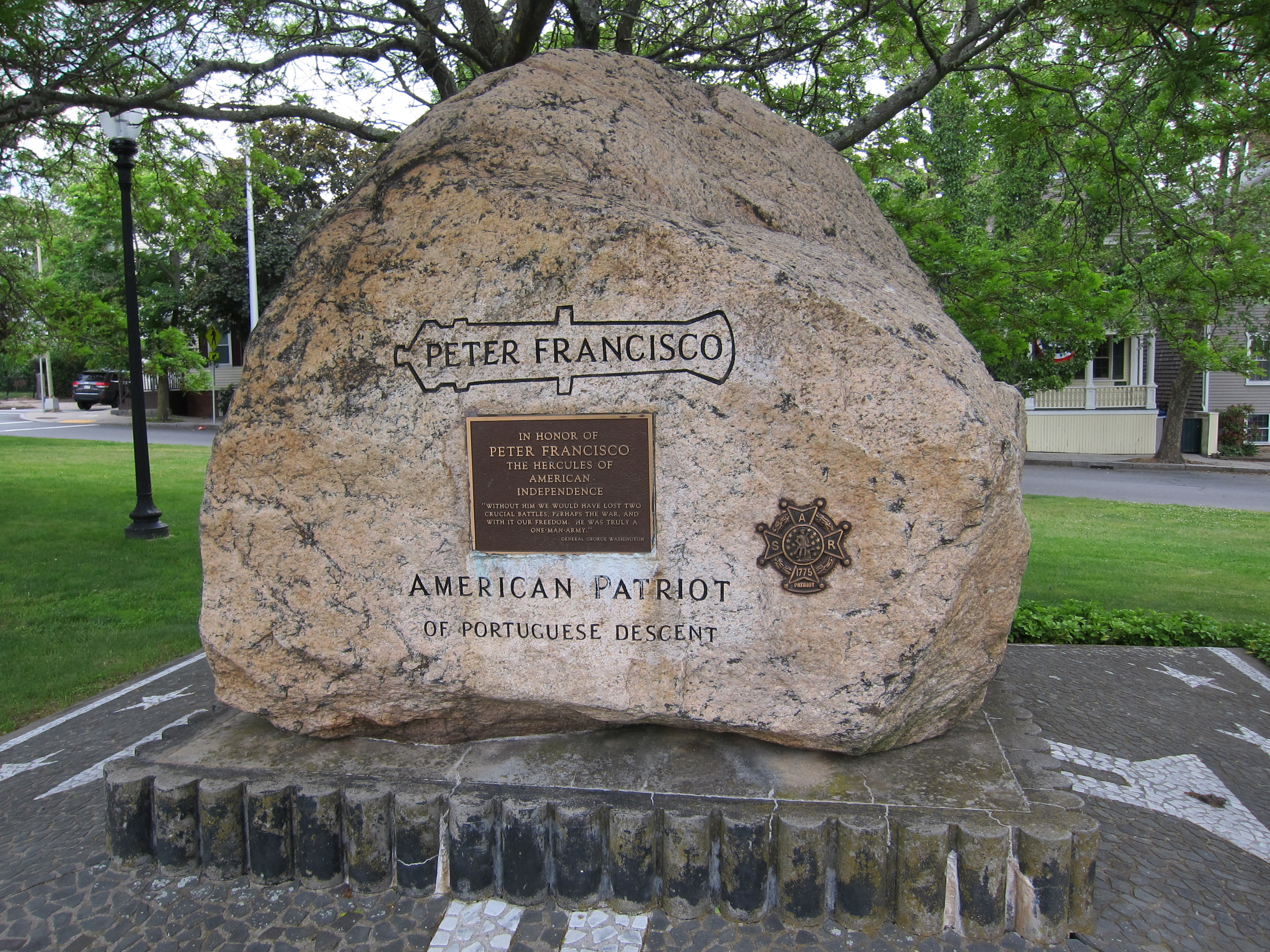
Monument to Francisco in New Bedford, Massachusetts

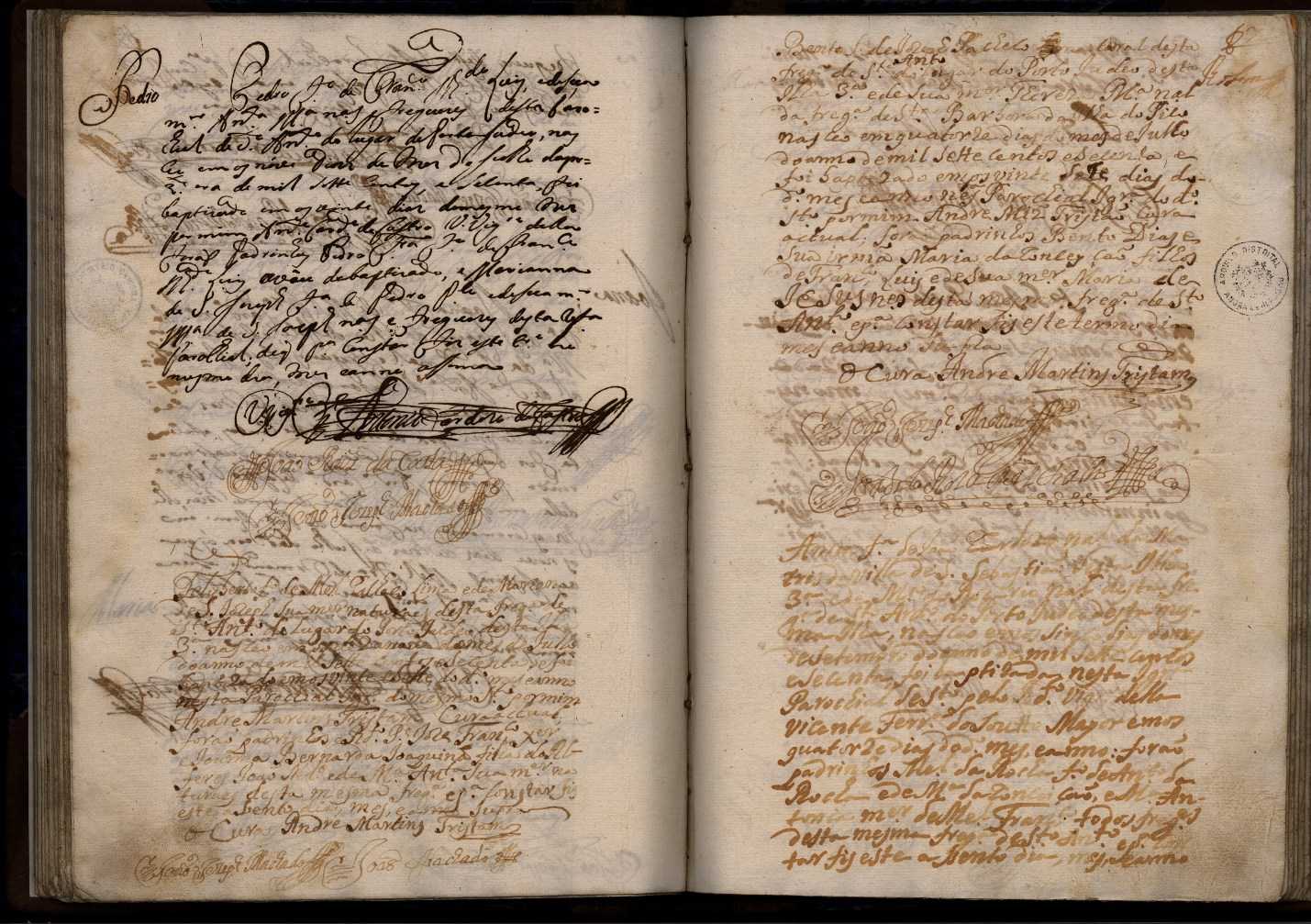
Peter (Pedro) Francisco, born July 9, 1760. Birth certificate from the church at the town of Porto Judeu, Terceira Island, Azores, Portugal.

Francisco's very early years were shrouded in mystery until the 1970s when it was discovered that he was born on July 9, 1760, at Porto Judeu, on the island of Terceira, in the Archipelago of the Azores, Portugal. In the case of the origin of his identification with the child named Pedro Francisco, his parents, Luiz Francisco Machado and Antónia Maria, natives of mainland Portugal (then an empire under the government of the Marquis of Pombal), a relatively wealthy and noble family, settled on the Island of Terceira (where he was born), distancing themselves more from personal or political enemies in the continent. According to the traditional version of his biography, he was found at about age five on the docks at City Point, Virginia, in 1765, and was taken to the Prince George County Poorhouse. Not speaking English, he repeated the name "Pedro Francisco." The locals called him Peter. They soon discovered the boy spoke Portuguese and noted his clothing was of good quality.

When able to communicate, Pedro said that he had lived in a mansion near the ocean. His mother spoke French and his father spoke another language that he did not know. He and his sister were kidnapped from the grounds, but his sister escaped, while Francisco was bound and taken to a ship. Historians believe it is possible that the kidnappers intended to hold the children for ransom or that they had intended to sell them as indentured servants at their destination port in North America, but changed their minds. The Azorean legend says the Francisco family had many political enemies and set up Peter's abduction to protect him from accident or death by his parents' foes.

Peter was taken in by the judge Anthony Winston of Buckingham County, Virginia, an uncle of Patrick Henry's. Francisco lived with Winston and his family until the beginning of the American Revolution and was tutored by them. When he was old enough to work, he was apprenticed as a blacksmith, a profession chosen because of his massive size and strength (he grew to be 6 ft 6 in (198 cm) and weigh around 265 lb (120 kg), especially large at the time). It was also noted that his hair may have turned silver at an early age. He was well known as the Virginian Hercules or the Virginia Giant.

== Career ==
=== American Revolutionary War ===
At the age of 16, Francisco joined the 10th Virginia Regiment in 1776 and soon gained notoriety for his size and strength. He fought with distinction at numerous engagements, including the Battle of Brandywine in September. He fought a few skirmishes under Colonel Daniel Morgan, before transferring to the regiment of Colonel John Mayo of Powhatan. In October, Francisco rejoined his regiment and fought in the Battle of Germantown and the Siege of Fort Mifflin on Port Island in the Delaware River. Francisco was hospitalized at Valley Forge for two weeks following these engagements. On June 28, 1778, he fought at the Battle of Monmouth, where an enemy musket ball tore through his right thigh. He never fully recovered from this wound, but fought at the Battle of Cowpens and other battles.

Francisco was part of General Anthony Wayne's attack on the British fort of Stony Point on the Hudson River. Upon attacking the fort, Francisco suffered a nine-inch gash in his stomach, but continued to fight; he was second to enter the fort. Francisco's entry into the fort is mentioned in Wayne's report on the battle to General Washington, dated July 17, 1779, and in a letter written by Captain William Evans to accompany Francisco's letter to the Virginia General Assembly in November 1820 for pay. As a result of being the second man to enter the fort, he received 200 dollars.

In a letter Francisco wrote to the Virginia General Assembly on November 11, 1820, he said that at Camden, he had killed a grenadier who had tried to shoot Colonel Mayo. He also claimed he escaped on horseback after bayoneting a British Legion cavalryman, shouting cries to make the British think he was a Loyalist; the horse was later given to Mayo.

Hearing that Colonel William Washington was headed on a march through the Carolinas, Francisco joined him, participating in the Battle of Guilford Courthouse in North Carolina. He reportedly killed eleven enemy soldiers during the battle, including one who wounded him severely in the thigh with a bayonet. In his own words, Francisco was "seen to kill two men, besides making many other panes [sic] which were doubtless fatal to others." These purported actions were commemorated with a monument to Francisco at the Guilford Courthouse National Military Park.

=== Cannon barrel carry feat ===
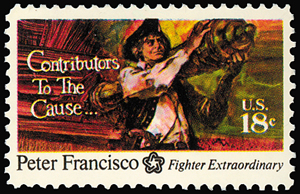
Postage stamp depicting Francisco's cannon barrel carry at Camden

Possibly Francisco's most famous feat of strength occurred at Battle of Camden, South Carolina, where he noticed the Americans were leaving behind one of their valuable cannons, mired in mud. According to the legend, Francisco freed and picked up the 1,100 lb (499 kg) cannon barrel and carried it on his shoulder to keep it from falling into the hands of the British.

However, scholars have argued that the weight of the cannon barrel depicted in old sources ranging from 600–1,100 lb (272–499 kg) is an exaggeration, and the actual weight would have been around 200–300 lb (91–136 kg). During 2019 Strongest Man in History TV show, the participants speculated the weight would have been a maximum 350 lb (159 kg).

=== Francisco's Fight ===
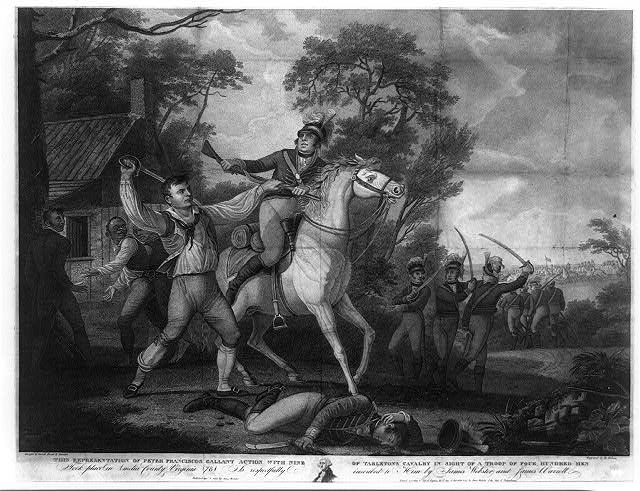
Francisco (left) during Francisco's Fight, an alleged skirmish illustrated in this 1814 engraving by David Edwin after James Barralet

Francisco was sent home to Buckingham, Virginia to recuperate. He volunteered to spy on the British Legion, who were operating in the area. On this journey, he performed his best-known action: Francisco's Fight. He claimed to have defeated a detachment of the Legion and captured several of their horses. Legend has it that he killed or mortally wounded three of an eleven-man patrol. According to Henry Howe, the alleged encounter happened when one night, nine of the Legion's cavalrymen surrounded Francisco outside of a tavern and ordered him to be arrested. They told him to give over his silver shoe buckles. Francisco told them take the buckles themselves. When one of them began to seize his shoe buckles, Francisco took a soldier's saber and struck him on the head. The wounded soldier fired his pistol, grazing Francisco's side; Francisco nearly cut off the soldier's hand. Another soldier aimed a musket at Francisco, but it misfired. Francisco grabbed it from the soldier's hands, knocked him off his mount, and escaped with the horse.

However, in his 1820 letter to the Virginia legislature, Francisco reported having killed one and wounded eight enemy soldiers along with capturing eight of their horses. In an 1829 petition to the United States Congress, he claimed to have killed three soldiers and frightened the other six away while capturing eight of their horses.

In 1781, Francisco was at Yorktown with Lafayette and witnessed the surrender of the besieged British army under the command of Lord Cornwallis.

=== Later years ===
Following the end of the American Revolutionary War, Francisco pursued his basic education. He went to school with young children, who were fascinated by his stories of the war. Legends of Francisco's strength abounded during his lifetime.

It has been claimed that Francisco saved over thirty people from the theater during the Richmond Theatre fire of 26 December 1811, having been in attendance at the performance.

In his later years, Francisco was poor and had petitioned Congress and the Virginia legislature for a pension. He spent the last three years of his life working as the Sergeant-at-Arms to the Virginia State Senate.

== Personal life ==
In December 1784, Peter married Susannah Anderson (1767–1790) of Cumberland County, Virginia. She was the daughter of Captain James Anderson and his wife Elizabeth Tyler Baker Anderson. The Andersons were of social distinction and owned a plantation called "The Mansion." Peter sold the 250 acres on Louse Creek in 1788. Before her death of dysentery in 1790, Peter and Susannah were the parents of two children:

- James Anderson Francisco (1786–1839), who was born in the log house; he married Judith Woodson Michaux.
- Polly Francisco (b. 1788).

In December 1794, Peter married Catherine Fauntleroy Brooke, who was a relative of his first wife's, and they moved to Peter's home in Cumberland. Before her death in 1821, Peter and Catherine were the parents of four children:

- Susan Brooke Francisco (1797–1869), who married Col. Edward Pescud in 1820. After his death in 1840, she married Siemon Schacht in 1866.
- Benjamin Morris Francisco (1803–1883) a doctor; he married Annie Goodwin in 1847. After her death in 1882, he married Mary Jane Lawrence.
- Peter Francisco Jr.
- Catherine Brooke Francisco (1801–1863), who married Dandridge Spotswood, son of Capt. John Spotswood Jr., descendants of Virginia Governor Alexander Spotswood; they were parents of William Francisco Spotswood.

After his second wife died in 1821, he married for the third time, in July 1823, this time to Mary Grymes West.

He died of appendicitis, on January 16, 1831, and was buried with full military honors in Shockoe Hill Cemetery in Richmond. The Virginia state legislature adjourned for the day, and many legislators attended his funeral.

== Legacy and honors ==
- 1975, Francisco was commemorated on a stamp by the US Postal Service in its "Contributors to the Cause" Bicentennial series. The image shows his saving the cannon at Camden.
- Peter Francisco Park in the Ironbound section of Newark, New Jersey, where most of the population is ethnic Portuguese, is named for him. The community also erected a monument to Francisco there.
- His farmhouse, Locust Grove, still stands outside the town of Dillwyn, in Buckingham County.
- The town of Francisco in Stokes County, North Carolina is named for him.
- Legend has it that General Washington commissioned a special six-foot broadsword to match Francisco's size. Some years after his death, that famous sword was presented by his daughter, Mrs. Edward Pescud of Petersburg, Va., to the Virginia Historical Society. However, the weapon has since disappeared.
- One of his swords, though not the broadsword commissioned for him by Washington, is displayed in the Buckingham County Historical Museum.
- Peter Francisco Square, marked by a monument honoring his life and service, was named at the corner of Hill Street and Mill Street in New Bedford, Massachusetts, which has a large ethnic Portuguese community. The monument includes a Sons of the American Revolution (SAR) medallion of honor.
- A small stone monument dedicated to Peter Francisco and all Portuguese-American veterans is located on the property of the Hudson Portuguese Club in Hudson, Massachusetts.
- Peter Francisco Day is officially recognized on March 15 (anniversary of the Battle of Guilford Court House) in Massachusetts, Rhode Island, and Virginia, while Maryland has also honored him on this day.
- The Portuguese Continental Union, a U.S.-based fraternal benefit society, bestows the Peter Francisco Award on individuals or institutions who bring prestige to people of Portuguese heritage in the United States and to the Portuguese language and culture.
- A statue of Peter as a young boy stands in his birthplace of Porto Judeu, Terceira, dedicated in 2015 on the 250th anniversary of his arrival in America.
- A monument commemorating the life of Peter Francisco is located on the grounds of the municipal building in Hopewell, Va. The City of Hopewell (formerly City Point) is believed to be the location where young Peter was found abandoned on the docks as a child. The city of Hopewell has also named a street in his honor – "Peter Francisco Drive."
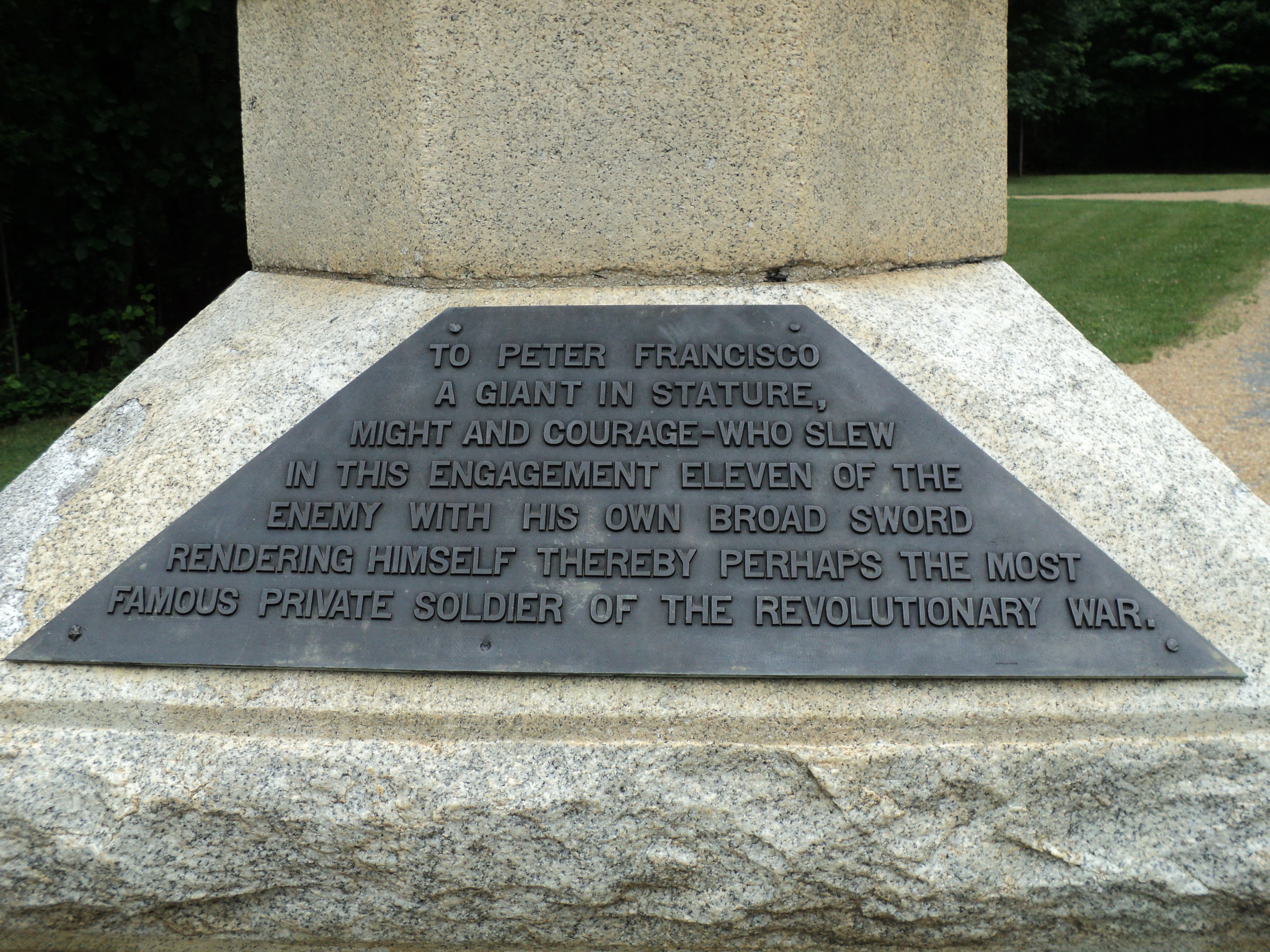
Monument to Francisco, Guilford Courthouse National Military Park

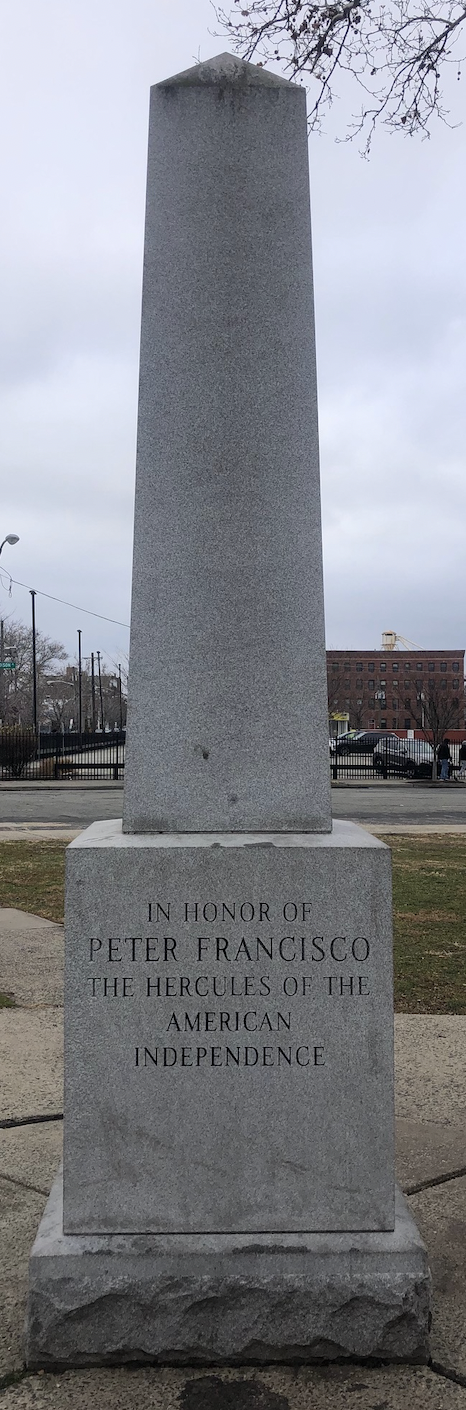
Peter's Francisco monument in Newark

Francisco's significant stature and sizable sword, as illustrated in Sword of Francisco

== In popular culture ==
- Namesake of the fiddle tune "Peter Francisco"
- Namesake of a folk song recorded by Jimmie Driftwood. The song tells a tall tale bearing little resemblance to Francisco's actual biography.
- Namesake of a folk song recorded by Danny O'Flaherty. This song attempts to tell a more accurate story of his life.
- Central figure in the 1956 young adult novel Sword of Francisco by Charles Wilson
- Central figure in the 2015 novel Luso: For Love, Liberty, and Legacy by Travis Bowman.
- The seventh episode of the first season of the History Channel television show The Strongest Man In History has the show's four professional strongmen, Eddie Hall, Nick Best, Robert Oberst, and Brian Shaw, recounting and recreating several of Francisco's legendary feats of strength.
