= Jennings Ordinary, Virginia =

Unincorporated community in Virginia, United States

Jennings Ordinary
- Unincorporated community
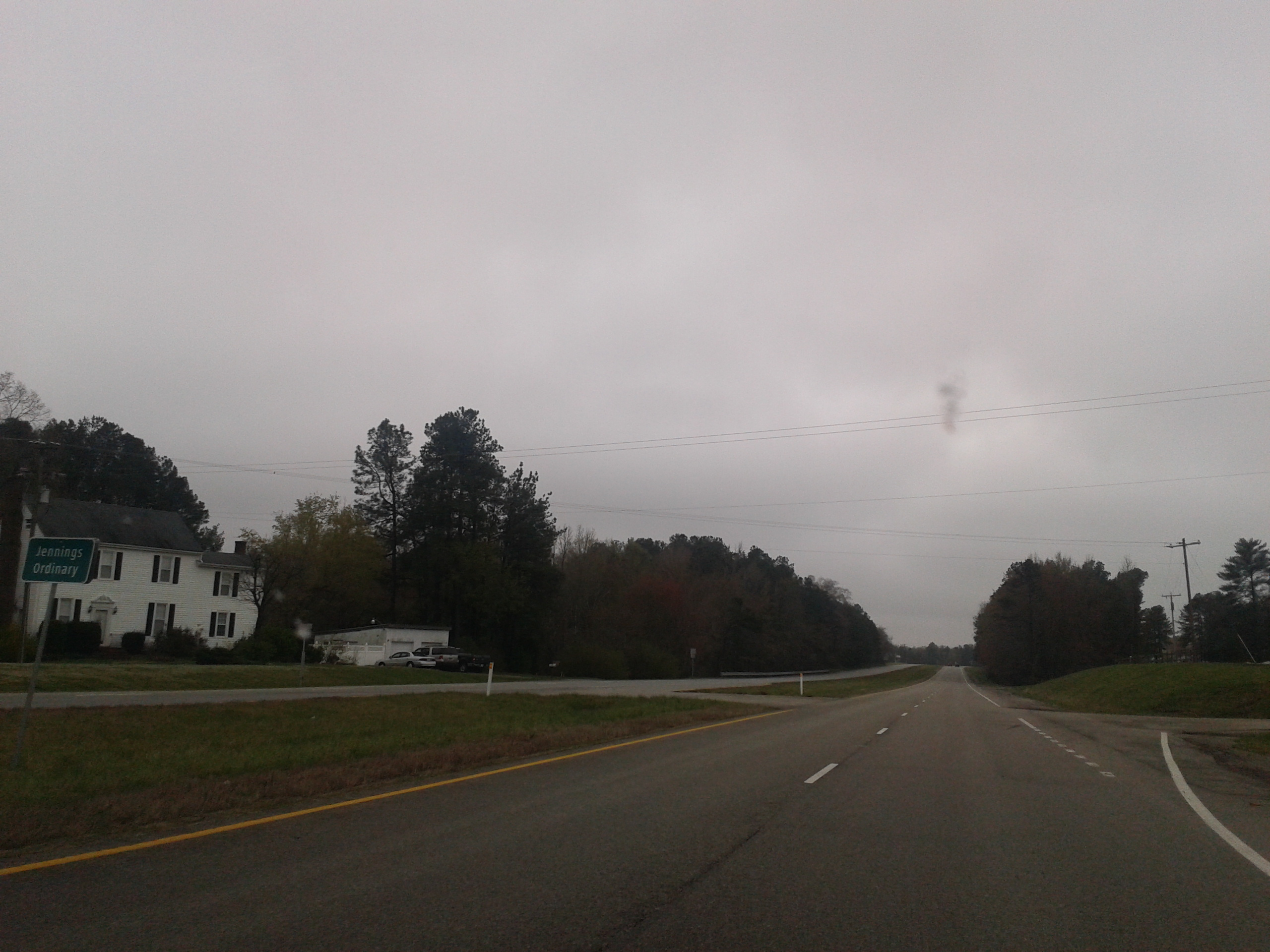
- Jennings Ordinary, April, 2015

- Location within the state of Virginia Jennings Ordinary (the United States)
- Coordinates: 37°13′22″N 78°8′44″W
- Country: United States
- State: Virginia
- County: Nottoway
- Elevation: 502 ft (153 m)
- Time zone: UTC-5 (Eastern (EST))
  - Summer (DST): UTC-4 (EDT)
- GNIS ID: 1493142

Jennings Ordinary is an unincorporated community in Nottoway County, Virginia, United States. It was also known as Jennings Store.

In the summer of 1965, a house at 6313 Patrick Henry Highway in Jennings Ordinary became the first headquarters of the Virginia Students' Civil Rights Committee (VSCRC), a biracial organization of Virginia College students that grew out of a conference held at Hampton Institute in December 1964 by the Student Nonviolent Coordinating Committee (SNCC), designed to move the experience of Mississippi's Freedom Summer project to Virginia.

In June, 1965, SNCC staffers Stokely Carmichael, Charlie Cobb and Chuck Neblett visited the house at Jennings Ordinary to train the students gathered there in the skills of community organizing. Part of their advice was to move out into several counties in the Southside Virginia Black Belt, which was done for the rest of VSCRC's existence in the 1960s.
