= Thomas Bentley Mott =

American military officer and author (1865–1952)

Colonel Thomas Bentley Mott (May 16, 1865 – December 17, 1952) was an American military officer and author who served as a liaison officer between General "Black Jack" Pershing and French Marshal Ferdinand Foch during World War I. He occupied this position from April 1914 until the end of the war, traveling with General Foch to each of his headquarters in Sarcus, Château de Mouchy, Bombon, and Senlis. He is most noted for translating, editing and publishing the autobiography of General Ferdinand Foch, The Memoirs of Marshal Foch, in 1931.

== Career ==
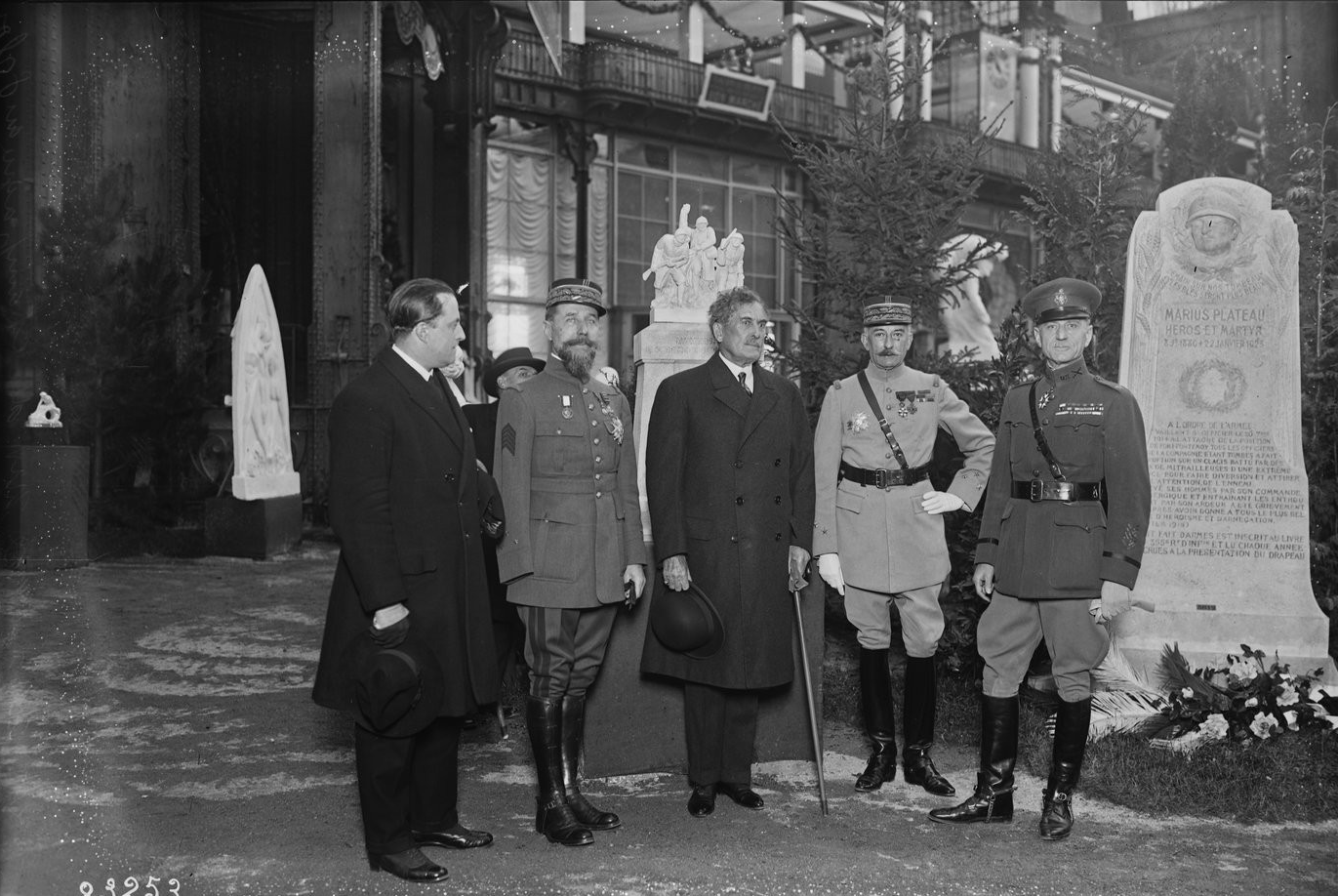
T. Bentley Mott (right) with General Alexis-Roger Hély d'Oissel (1859–1937), Myron Timothy Herrick (1854–1929), General Henri Gouraud (1867–1946), and sculptor Maxime Real del Sarte (1888–1954), May 1923.

Mott was born in Leesburg, Virginia and graduated 32nd in a class of 77 from the United States Military Academy at West Point in 1886. Commissioned as an Artillery officer, he returned to West Point to teach in 1890. He was the aide-de-camp to General Wesley Merritt during the Spanish–American War, and the invasion of Manila, in 1898. Mott was appointed a military attaché in Paris in 1900, where he stayed for twenty years. He served for ten years under Ambassador Myron T. Herrick, before retiring in 1914, and returning to active service when the United States entered World War I.

At the end of the war Mott was awarded the Commandeur de la Legion d'honneur. Additionally, he was a Companion of the Order of St Michael and St George and recipient of the Distinguished Service Medal.

Mott married Rose Gabrille Georgette Saint Paul, a French heroine who ran a mobile hospital during World War I and recipient of the Chevalier de la Legion d'honneur, on May 23, 1923. The couple lived in Biarritz during World War II.

== Death ==
Mott died at the age of 87 in December 1952, in Biarritz, France, and is buried in Paris, France, along with his wife, Georgette. A cenotaph in his honor sits in Union Cemetery in Leesburg, Virginia.

== Works ==
- Mott, T. Bentley. "Work and Play of the Military Attachés," Scribner's XXXIV (1903), pp. 293–306.
- Mott, T. Bentley, Myron T. Herrick, Friend of France, New York: Doubleday, 1929.
- Mott, T. Bentley, The Memoirs of Marshall Foch, London: Heinemann, 1931.
- Mott, T. Bentley (tr.), The Memoirs of Marshal Joffre, Vol. I, London: Bles, 1932.
- Mott, T. Bentley (tr.), "The Memoirs of Marshal Joffre, Vol. II", London: Bles, 1932.
- Mott, T. Bentley, Twenty Years as Military Attache, New York: Oxford University Press, 1937.
