= Eugène von Rothschild =

Member of prominent Rothschild family (1884–1976)

Eugène Daniel (Bun) von Rothschild
- Born: 6 March 1884
- Died: 25 April 1976 (aged 92); Monte Carlo
- Spouse(s): Catherine Wolff (m. 1925; died 1946) Jeanne Stuart (m. 1952)
- Parent(s): Albert Salomon von Rothschild; Bettina Caroline de Rothschild
- Relatives: Georg Anselm Alphonse (1877–1934); Alphonse Meyer de Rothschild (1878–1942); Charlotte Esther von Rothschild (1879–1885); Ludwig Nathaniel (1882–1955); Valentine Noémi von Rothschild (1886–1969); Oskar von Rothschild (1888–1909)

Baron Eugène Daniel von Rothschild (6 March 1884 – 25 April 1976) was a member of the notable Rothschild family. He was part of the 5th generation of Rothschild (measured from Mayer Amschel) and his parents were Salomon and Bettina Rothschild. He was descended from the Austrian branch of the family.

== Early life ==
Rothschild was born on 6 March 1884. He was a younger son of Albert Salomon von Rothschild and Bettina Caroline de Rothschild.

== Career ==
He served in the World War I in the Austro-Hungarian Army but after the war was less need for soldiers and thus he retired.

== Personal life ==
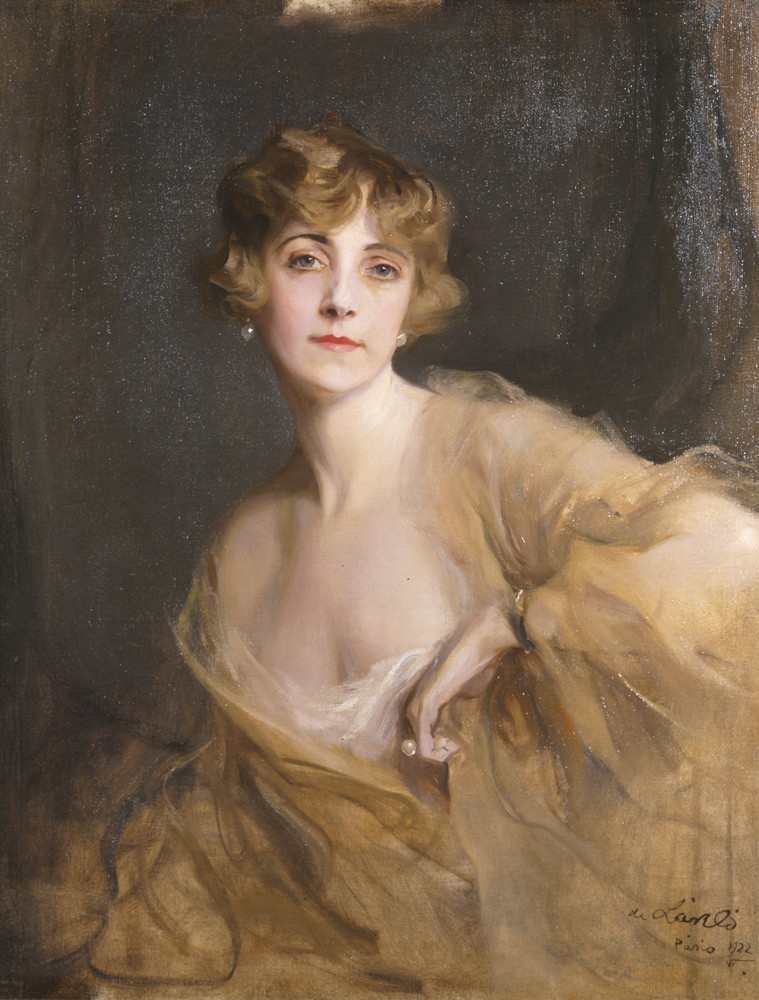
Portrait of his first wife, Kitty, by Philip de László, 1922

On 28 April 1925, after living together in Paris following her 1922 divorce, he married Countess Erwein von Schönborn-Buchheim (née Catherine "Kitty" Wolf, formerly Mrs. Dandridge Spotswood, who married Count Erwein in 1911) (1885–1946), Kitty (who was also American) was a friend of Wallis Simpson and after Edward VIII abdicated he traveled to Catherine and Eugène's Castle in Enzesfeld near Vienna. Shortly after the beginning of World War II, Catherine and Eugène left for Locust Valley, New York where Catherine later died in 1946.

Eugène then remarried the actress Jeanne Stuart on 21 December 1952. They both lived in New York City and Long Island but eventually left to live in Monte Carlo where he died in 1976.
