= 1813 in music =

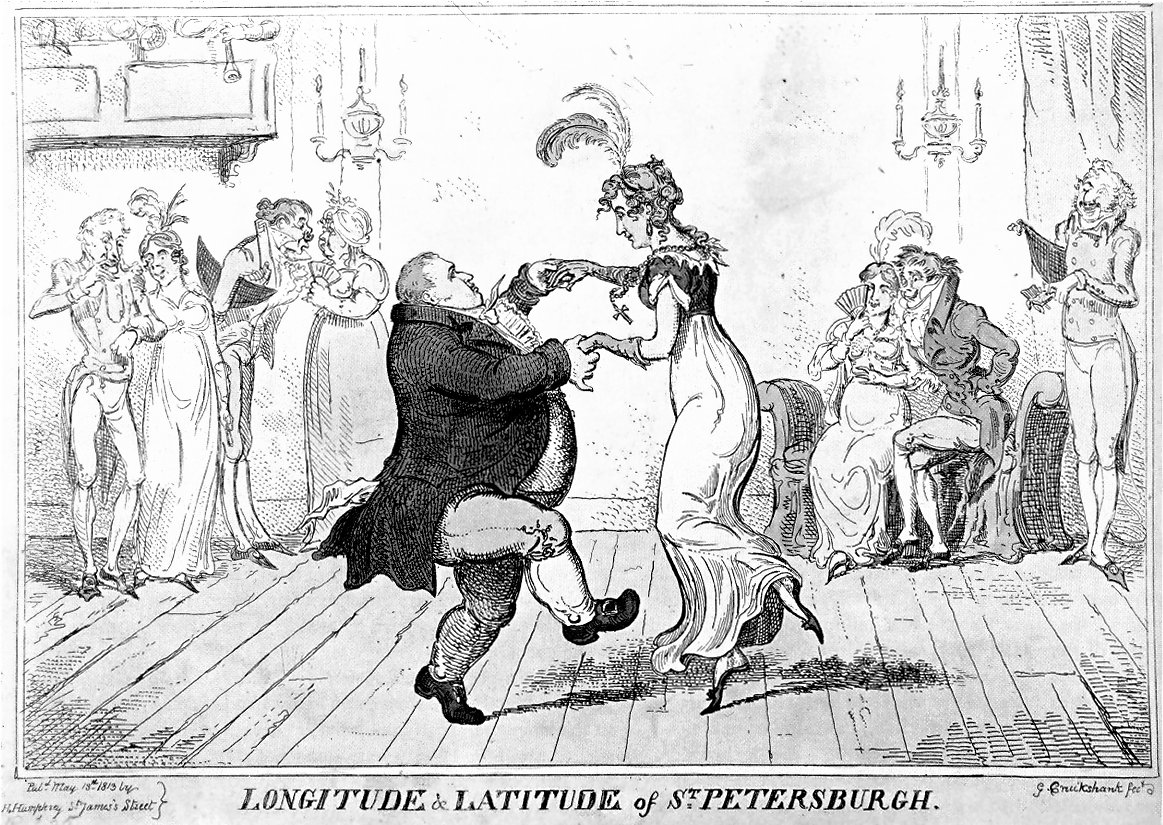

== Events ==
- March 8 – The inaugural concert of the Philharmonic Society takes place at the Argyll Rooms, off Piccadilly. Johann Peter Salomon leads the orchestra, and the pianist is Muzio Clementi.
- March 21 – Pianist Josepha Barbara Auernhammer gives her last public concert, appearing with her daughter, Marianna Auenheim.
- December 8 – Two new works by Ludwig van Beethoven, Wellington's Victory (originally written for panharmonicon) and Symphony No. 7 are premiered in a benefit concert held in Vienna for Austrian and Bavarian soldiers wounded at the Battle of Hanau. The orchestra, conducted by Beethoven himself, is led by his friend, Ignaz Schuppanzigh, and includes some of the finest musicians of the day, such as violinist Louis Spohr, Johann Nepomuk Hummel, Giacomo Meyerbeer, Antonio Salieri, Anton Romberg, and the Italian double bass virtuoso, Domenico Dragonetti.
- December 18 – The Teatro Re in Milan is inaugurated with a new production of Rossini's Tancredi
- Louise Reichardt moves to Hamburg, where she opens the first public music school for women and conducts a women's choir.
- Franz Krommer succeeds Leopold Kozeluch as court composer to the Imperial Court of Austria.
- The claviharp is invented by J. C. Dietz.

== Bands formed ==
- January 24 – Musicians found the Philharmonic Society of London (later The Royal Philharmonic Society) to give the first public orchestral concerts in London.

== Popular music ==
- "Tippitywitchet" aka "A Typitywitchet or Pantomimical Paroxysms" sung by Joseph Grimaldi in Bang Up!. Continued to be popular into 1814 with Grimaldi's performance in Don Juan

== Classical music ==
- Ludwig van Beethoven
  - Wellington's Victory, Op. 91
  - Der Bardengeist, WoO 142
- Friedrich Kalkbrenner – Fantasia No.1, Op. 5
- Friedrich Kuhlau – 5 Variations on 'sur un air national danois', Op. 14
- Ferdinand Ries
  - Symphony No. 5, Op. 112
- Franz Schubert
  - Totengräberlied, D. 38
  - Unendliche Freude, D. 51
  - Unendliche Freude, D. 54
  - Hier strecket der wallende Pilger, D. 57
  - Dessen Fahne Donnerstürme wallte, D. 58
  - Hier umarmen sich getreue Gatten, D. 60
  - Ein jugendlicher Maienschwung, D. 61
  - Wer die steile Sternenbahn, D. 63
  - Frisch atmet des Morgens lebendiger Hauch, D. 67
  - Die zwei Tugendwege, D. 71
  - Thekla, D. 73
  - Trinklied, D. 75
  - Pensa, che questo istante, D. 76
  - Symphony No. 1 in D major, D. 82
  - Des Teufels Lustschloss, D. 84
  - Verschwunden sind die Schmerzen, D. 88
- Johann Franz Xaver Sterkel – Ouverture in C major, StWV 131
- Johann Wilhelm Wilms – Flute Concerto, Op. 24
- Peter von Winter – Octet in E-flat major

== Opera ==
- François-Adrien Boieldieu – Le nouveau Seigneur de village
- Giacomo Meyerbeer -Die beiden Kalifen
- Giovanni Pacini – Annetta e Lucindo
- Louis Spohr – Faust
- Gioacchino Rossini
  - L'italiana in Algeri
  - Tancredi
- Collaborative work (Johann Nepomuk Hummel, many others) – Fünf sind zwei

== Births ==
- February 14 – Alexander Dargomyzhsky, composer (d. 1869)
- March 2 – George Alexander Macfarren, composer (d. 1887)
- May 22 – Richard Wagner, composer (d. 1883)
- June 16 – Otto Jahn, music writer (d. 1869)
- August 10 – William Henry Fry, composer (d. 1864)
- August 15 – Léon Gastinel, composer (d. 1906)
- September 2 – Gustav Hölzel, operatic bass-baritone and composer (d. 1883)
- September 3 – Mathilda Gelhaar, opera singer (d. 1889)
- October 10 – Giuseppe Verdi, composer (d. 1901)
- October 16 – Julie von Webenau, composer (d. 1887)
- November 13 – Kreeta Haapasalo, Finnish kantele-player, singer and folk musician (d. 1893)
- November 19 – Augusta Smith, opera singer
- November 30 – Charles-Valentin Alkan, pianist and composer (d. 1888)
- December 27 – Jakob Rosenhain, pianist and composer (d. 1894)
- December 31 – Theodore Oesten, composer and musician (died 1870)
- date unknown – Johanna von Schoultz, opera singer (d. 1863)

== Deaths ==
- January 11 – Giuseppe Aprile, castrato singer (b. 1731)
- March 14 – Christian Ehregott Weinlig, composer and cantor (b. 1743)
- May 5 – Stepan Degtiarev, composer (b. 1766)
- June 7 – Maria Hester Park, pianist, singer and composer (b. 1760)
- April 14 – Joachim Nicolas Eggert, Swedish composer (born 1779)
- August 19 – Johann Carl Friedrich Rellstab, composer and music publisher (b. 1759)
- August 20 – Johann Baptist Wanhal, composer (b. 1739)
- August 26 – Daniel Gottlob Türk, composer, organist and music professor (b. 1756)
- September 24 – André Grétry, composer (b. 1741)
- October 5 – Etienne Ozi, bassoonist and composer (b. 1754)
- November 2 – Johann Gottfried Vierling, organist and composer (b. 1750)
- November 29 – Jean Balthasar Tricklir, cellist and composer (b. 1750)
- December 1 – Ferdinando Bertoni, organist and composer (b. 1725)
