= List of operas by Giacomo Meyerbeer =

The following is a list of operas by Giacomo Meyerbeer (1791–1864).

== List of operas ==
Operas by Giacomo Meyerbeer
Title	Genre	Language	Acts	Libretto	Premiere		Notes
Title	Genre	Language	Acts	Libretto	Date	Venue	Notes
Der Admiral, oder der verlorne Prozess	comic opera	German			Written 1811, never performed		
Jephtas Gelübde	Ernsthafte Oper (Singspiel)	German	3 acts	Aloys Schreiber, based on the biblical story of Jephthah	23 December 1812	Hoftheater, Munich	
Wirth und Gast, oder Aus Scherz Ernst	Lustspiel mit Gesang	German	2 acts	Johann Gottfried Wollbrück	6 January 1813	Stuttgart	Produced in Vienna in 1814 as Alimelek, oder Die beiden Kalifen
Das Brandenburger Tor	Singspiel	German	1 act	Johann Emanuel Veith	7 August 1814	Schauspielhaus Berlin	
Romilda e Costanza	melodramma semiserio	Italian	2 acts	Gaetano Rossi	19 July 1817	Padua	
Semiramide riconosciuta	dramma per musica	Italian	2 acts	Gaetano Rossi, after Metastasio	3 February 1819	Teatro Regio, Turin	
Emma di Resburgo	melodramma eroico	Italian	2 acts	Gaetano Rossi	26 June 1819	Teatro San Benedetto, Venice	
Margherita d'Anjou	melodramma semiserio	Italian	2 acts	Felice Romani after René Charles Guilbert de Pixérécourt	14 November 1820	La Scala, Milan	Revised 1826 for Paris.
L'Almanzore		Italian		Gaetano Rossi	Unperformed		Probably composed 1820–21; intended for the Teatro Argentina in Rome but never performed there. Believed to have been unfinished; it is also possible that its music was used in L'esule di Granata
L'esule di Granata	melodramma	Italian	2 acts	Felice Romani	12 March 1822	La Scala, Milan	
Il crociato in Egitto	melodramma	Italian	2 acts	Gaetano Rossi	7 March 1824	La Fenice, Venice	Frequently revised by Meyerbeer
Ines de Castro	melodramma tragico	Italian		Salvatore Cammarano	drafts from 1825		Commissioned by Teatro San Carlo, Naples, for 1826, but never completed.
Robert le diable	grand opera	French	5 acts	Eugène Scribe and Casimir Delavigne	21 November 1831	Paris Opéra, Salle Le Peletier	
Les Huguenots	grand opera	French	5 acts	Eugène Scribe and Émile Deschamps	29 February 1836	Paris Opéra, Salle Le Peletier	Sometimes staged during the 19th century under other titles such as The Guelfs and the Ghibellines or The Anglicans and the Puritans (see the article on the opera)
Ein Feldlager in Schlesien	Singspiel	German	3 acts	Ludwig Rellstab after Eugène Scribe	7 December 1844	Hofoper, Berlin	Revised as Vielka, Vienna, 18 February 1847
Le prophète	grand opera	French	5 acts	Eugène Scribe	16 April 1849	Paris Opéra, Salle Le Peletier	
L'étoile du nord	opéra comique	French	3 acts	Eugène Scribe	16 February 1854	Opéra-Comique, Paris	Partly based on the earlier Feldlager in Schlesien; revised in Italian, London, Covent Garden, 19 July 1855
Le pardon de Ploërmel (more commonly performed as Dinorah)	opéra comique	French	3 acts	Jules Barbier and Michel Carré	4 April 1859	Opéra-Comique, Paris	Revised in Italian as Dinorah, Covent Garden, London, 26 July 1859
L'Africaine	grand opera	French	5 acts	Eugène Scribe	28 April 1865	Paris Opéra, Salle Le Peletier	Performed posthumously in an edition by François-Joseph Fétis.

== Notes and sources ==
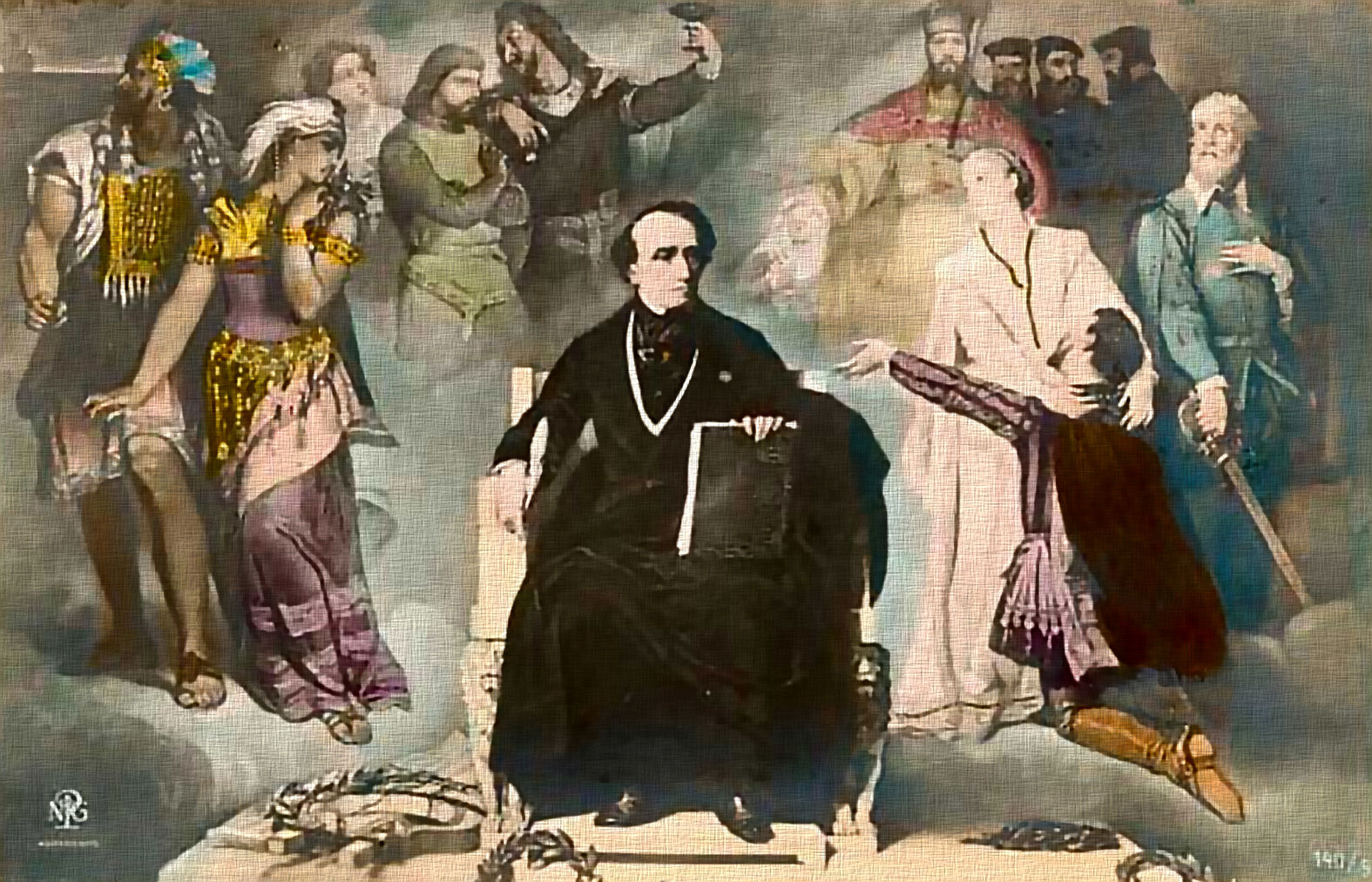
Giacomo Meyerbeer surrounded by characters from his most famous operas. From left to right: Nélusko and Sélika (L'Africaine); Alice, Robert and Bertram (Robert le diable); Fidès, Jean de Leyden and the three anabaptistes (Le prophète); Valentine, Raoul and Marcel (Les Huguenots)

Notes

Sources

- Anon. (n.d.). "Music and history by the year: 1819". MusicAndHistory.com. Archived from the original on 28 August 2012.
- Becker, Heinz (1980). "Meyerbeer [Meyer Beer], Giacomo [Jakob Liebmann]". In Sadie, Stanley, The New Grove Dictionary of Music and Musicians, vol. 12, 246–256. London: Macmillan
- Becker, Heinz and Gudrun Becker, tr. Mark Violette (1989). Giacomo Meyerbeer, a Life in Letters. London: Christopher Helm. ISBN 0-7470-0230-4.
- Huebner, Steven (1992). "Meyerbeer, Giacomo". In Sadie, Stanley, The New Grove Dictionary of Opera, 4: 366–371. London: Macmillan. ISBN 978-1-56159-228-9.
- Letellier, Robert Ignatius (2006). The Operas of Giacomo Meyerbeer. Cranbury: Associated University Presses. ISBN 978-0-8386-4093-7
- Meyerbeer, Giacomo (1960–2006). Briefwechsel und Tagebücher (8 vols.). Berlin and New York: de Gruyter.
