= Giacomo Meyerbeer =

German-born opera composer (1791–1864)

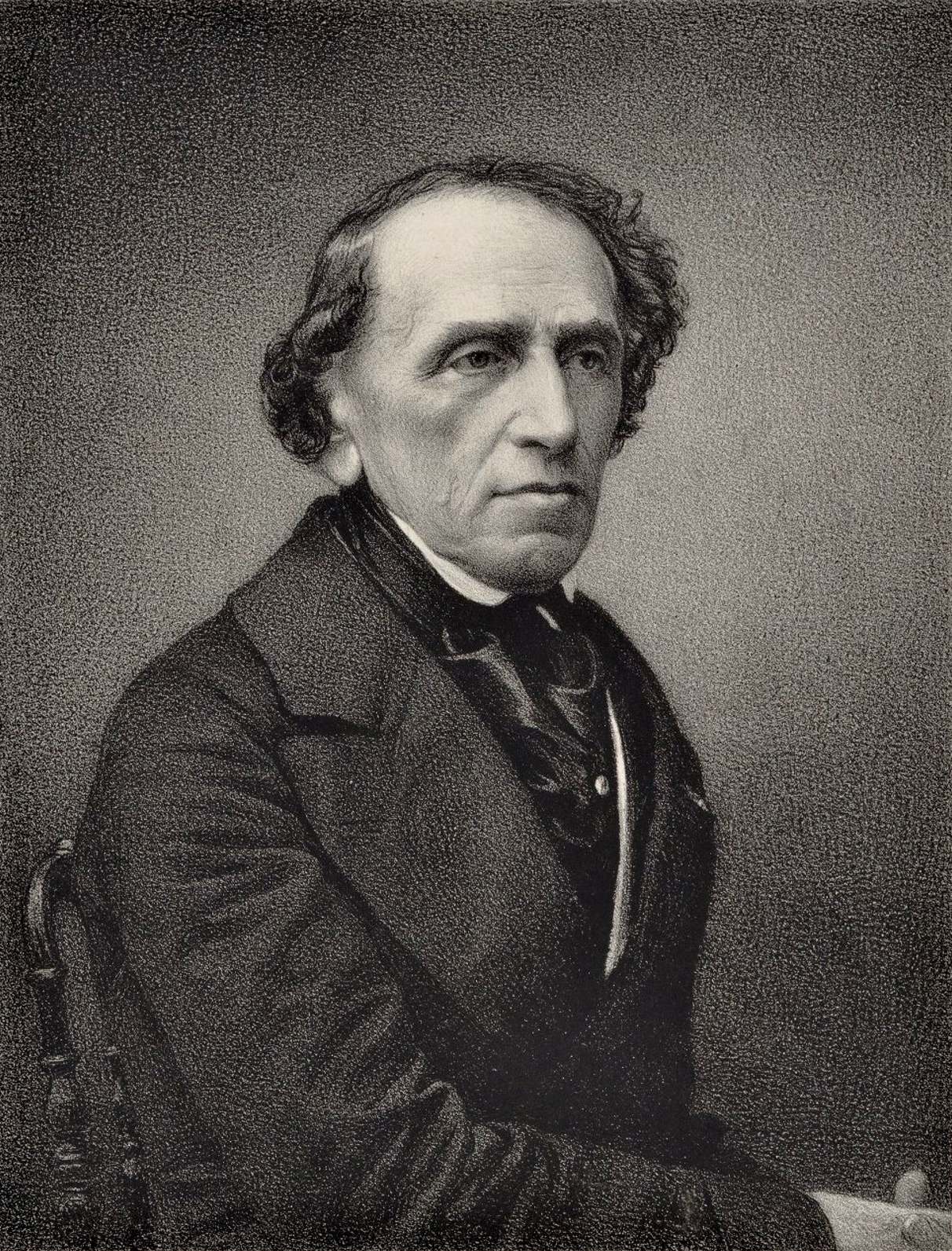
- Giacomo Meyerbeer, engraving from a photograph by Pierre Petit (1865)
- Born: Jakob Liebmann Meyer Beer; 5 September 1791; Tasdorf, Prussia
- Died: 2 May 1864 (aged 72); Paris, France
- Known for: Grand opera
- Works: List of operas

Giacomo Meyerbeer (Note: Pronunciation: UK: /ˈdʒækəmoʊ ˈmaɪ.ərbɪər/ JAK-ə-moh MY-ər-beer, US: /ˈdʒɑːk-/ JAHK-; German: [ˈdʒaːkomoː ˈmaɪɐbeːɐ̯]; Italian: [ˈdʒaːkomo ˈmaːjerber].) (born Jakob Liebmann Meyer Beer; 5 September 1791 – 2 May 1864) was a German opera composer, linking Mozart and Wagner. With his 1831 opera Robert le diable and its successors, he gave the genre of grand opera "decisive character". Meyerbeer's grand opera style was achieved by his merging of German orchestra style with Italian vocal tradition. These were employed in the context of sensational and melodramatic libretti created by Eugène Scribe and were enhanced by the up-to-date theatre technology of the Paris Opéra. They set a standard that helped to maintain Paris as the opera capital of the nineteenth century.

Born to a wealthy Jewish family, Meyerbeer began his musical career as a pianist but soon decided to devote himself to opera, spending several years in Italy studying and composing. His 1824 opera Il crociato in Egitto was the first to bring him a Europe-wide reputation, but it was Robert le diable (1831) which raised his status to great celebrity. His public career, lasting from then until his death, during which he remained a dominating figure in the world of opera, was summarized by his contemporary Hector Berlioz, who claimed that he 'has not only the luck to be talented, but the talent to be lucky.' He was at his peak with his operas Les Huguenots (1836) and Le prophète (1849); his last opera, L'Africaine, was performed posthumously. His operas made him the most frequently performed composer at the world's leading opera houses in the nineteenth century.

At the same time as his successes in Paris, Meyerbeer, as a Prussian Court Kapellmeister (director of music) from 1832, and from 1843 as Prussian general music director, was also influential in opera in Berlin and throughout Germany. He was an early supporter of Richard Wagner, enabling the first production of the latter's opera Rienzi. He was commissioned to write the patriotic opera Ein Feldlager in Schlesien to celebrate the reopening of the Berlin Royal Opera House in 1844, and he wrote music for certain Prussian state occasions.

Apart from around 50 songs, Meyerbeer wrote little except for the stage. The critical assaults of Wagner and his supporters, especially after Meyerbeer's death, led to a decline in the popularity of his works; his operas were suppressed by the Nazi regime in Germany, and were neglected by opera houses through most of the twentieth century. In the 21st century, however, the composer's major French grand operas have begun to reappear in the repertory of numerous European opera houses.

== Early years ==
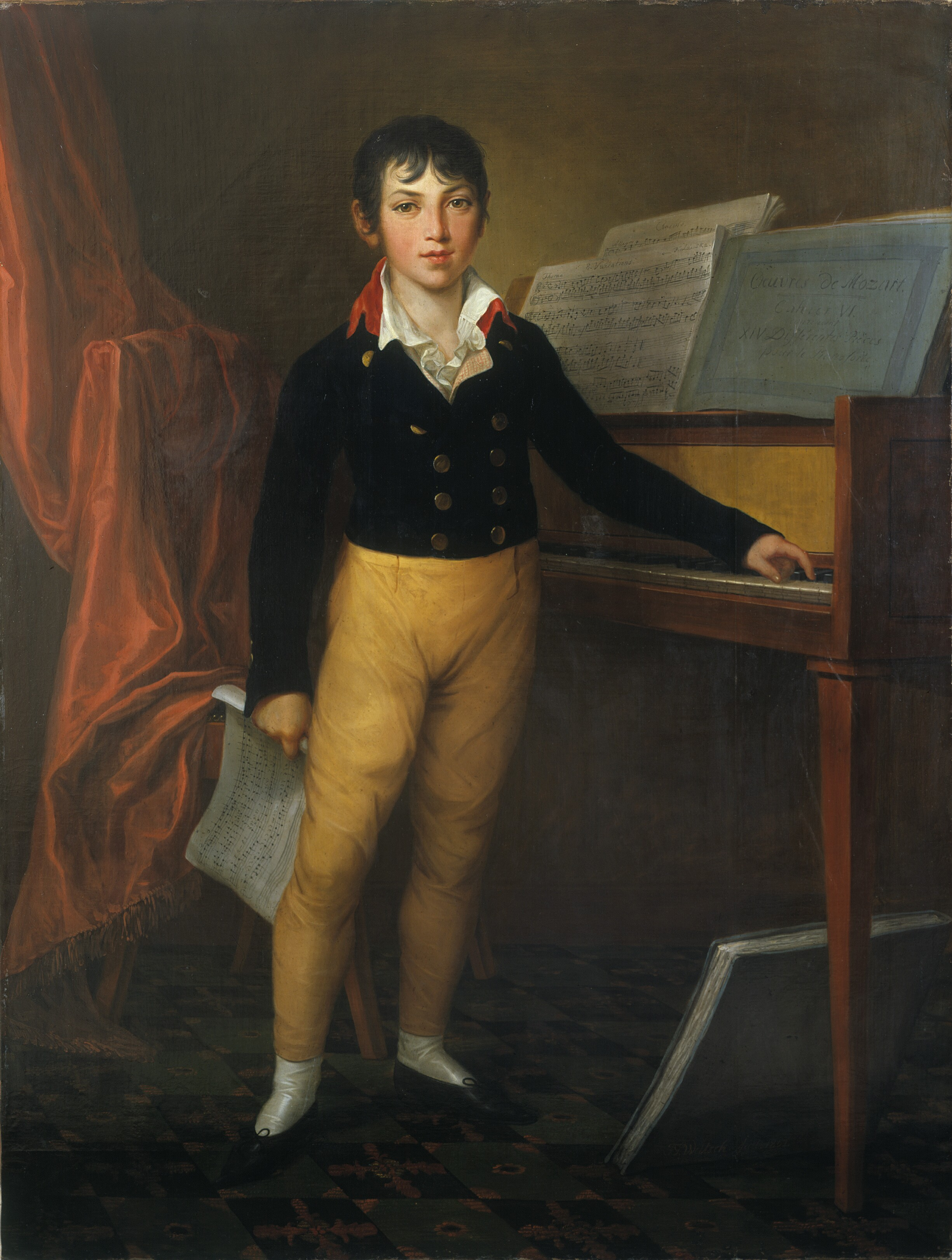
The young Jacob Beer, portrait by Friedrich Georg Weitsch (1803)

Meyerbeer's birth name was Jacob Liebmann Beer; he was born in Tasdorf (now a part of Rüdersdorf), near Berlin, then the capital of Prussia, to a Jewish family. His father was the wealthy financier Judah Herz Beer and his mother, Amalia (Malka) Wulff, to whom he was particularly devoted, also came from the moneyed elite. Their other children included the astronomer Wilhelm Beer and the poet Michael Beer. He was to adopt the surname Meyerbeer on the death of his grandfather Liepmann Meyer Wulff (1812) and Italianize his first name to Giacomo during his period of study in Italy, around 1817.

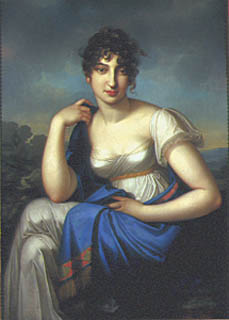
Amalie Beer, Meyerbeer's mother, painting by Carl Kretschmar, c. 1803

Judah Beer was a leader of the Berlin Jewish community and maintained a private synagogue in his house which leaned towards reformist views. Jacob Beer wrote an early cantata for performance at this synagogue. Both Judah Herz Beer and his wife were close to the Prussian court; when Amalia was awarded in 1816 the Order of Louise, she was given, by royal dispensation, not the traditional Cross but a portrait bust of the Queen. The Beer children were provided with a fine education; their tutors included two of the leaders of the enlightened Jewish intelligentsia, the author Aaron Halle-Wolfssohn and Edmund Kley, (later a reform movement rabbi in Hamburg) to whom they remained attached into their maturity. The brothers Alexander von Humboldt, the renowned naturalist, geographer and explorer, and the philosopher, linguist and diplomat Wilhelm von Humboldt were close friends of the family circle.

Beer's first keyboard instructor was Franz Lauska, a pupil of Johann Georg Albrechtsberger and a favoured teacher at the Berlin court. Beer also became one of Muzio Clementi's pupils while Clementi was in Berlin. The boy made his public debut in 1801 playing Mozart's D minor Piano Concerto in Berlin. The Allgemeine musikalische Zeitung reported: 'The amazing keyboard playing of young Bär (a Jewish lad of 9), who carried off the difficult passages and other solo parts with aplomb, and has fine powers of rendition even more rarely found in one of his age, made the concert even more interesting'.

Beer, as he still named himself, studied with Antonio Salieri and the German master and friend of Goethe, Carl Friedrich Zelter. Louis Spohr organised a concert for Beer at Berlin in 1804 and continued his acquaintance with the lad later in Vienna and Rome. A portrait of Jacob commissioned by the family at this time shows him "confidently facing the viewer, his hair romantically dishevelled... his left hand rests on the keyboard, and his right hand grasps a musical manuscript... plac[ing] its subject in the tradition of the young Mozart". Beer's first stage work, the ballet Der Fischer und das Milchmädchen (The Fisherman and the Milkmaid) was produced in March 1810 at the Court Opera in Berlin. His formal training with the Abbé Vogler at Darmstadt between 1810 and 1812 was, however, of crucial importance, and at around this time he begins to sign himself 'Meyer Beer'. Here, with his fellow students (among whom was Carl Maria von Weber), he learned not only the craft of composition but also the business of music (organising concerts and dealing with publishers). Forming a close friendship with Weber and other pupils, Meyerbeer established the Harmonischer Verein (Musical Union), whose members undertook to support each other with favourable press criticism and networking. On 12 February 1813 Beer received the first of the string of honours he was to accumulate throughout his life when he was appointed 'Court Composer' by Grand Duke Ludwig of Hesse-Darmstadt. He was also in close contact with Ludwig van Beethoven as he played timpani at the premiere of his Seventh Symphony in December 1813. Beethoven complained that Meyerbeer was "always behind the beat". But nonetheless, Beethoven saw musical potential in the young Beer.

Throughout his early career, although determined to become a musician, Beer found it difficult to decide between playing and composition. Certainly, other professionals in the decade 1810–1820, including Moscheles, considered him amongst the greatest virtuosi of his period. He wrote during this period numerous piano pieces, including a concerto and set of variations for piano and orchestra, but these have been lost. To this period also belongs a Clarinet Quintet written for the virtuoso Heinrich Baermann (1784–1847) who remained a close friend of the composer.

== Career ==
=== In Italy ===
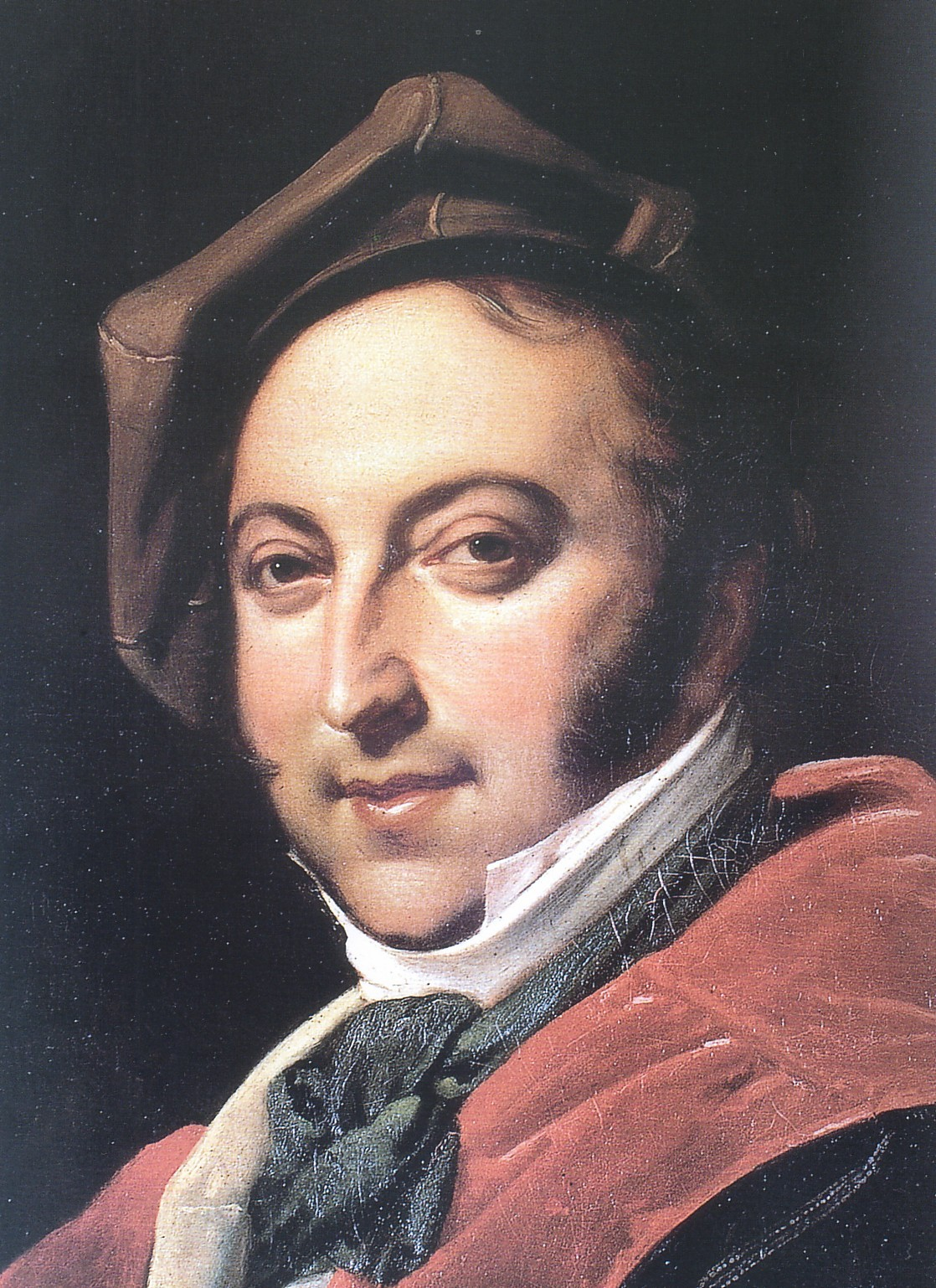
Gioachino Rossini in 1820

Despite performances of his oratorio Gott und die Natur (God and Nature) (Berlin, 1811) and his early operas Jephtas Gelübde (Jephtha's Vow) (Munich, 1812) and Wirth und Gast (Landlord and Guest) (Stuttgart, 1813) in Germany, Meyerbeer had set his sights by 1814 on basing an operatic career in Paris. In the same year, his opera Die beiden Kalifen (The Two Caliphs), a version of Wirth und Gast, was a disastrous failure in Vienna. Realizing that a full understanding of Italian opera was essential for his musical development, he went to study in Italy, enabled by the financial support of his family. He arrived in Italy at the beginning of 1816, after visits to Paris and London, where he heard Cramer play. In Paris, he wrote to a friend, "I go from museum to museum, library to library, theatre to theatre, with the restlessness of the Wandering Jew."

During his years in Italy Meyerbeer became acquainted with, and impressed by, the works of his contemporary Gioachino Rossini, who by 1816, at the age of 24, was already director of both major opera houses in Naples and in the same year premiered his operas The Barber of Seville and Otello. Meyerbeer wrote a series of Italian operas on Rossinian models, including Romilda e Costanza (Padua, 1817), Semiramide riconosciuta (Turin, 1819), Emma di Resburgo (Venice, 1819), Margherita d'Anjou (Milan, 1820) and L'esule di Granata (Milan, 1821). All but the last two of these had libretti by Gaetano Rossi, whom Meyerbeer continued to support until the latter's death in 1855, although not commissioning any further libretti from him after Il crociato in Egitto (1824). During a visit to Sicily in 1816, Meyerbeer noted down a number of folksongs, and these in fact constitute the earliest collection of folk music of the region. In a birthday greeting from Rossi's wife in 1817 occurs the earliest use discovered of Meyerbeer's adopted forename 'Giacomo'.

=== Recognition ===
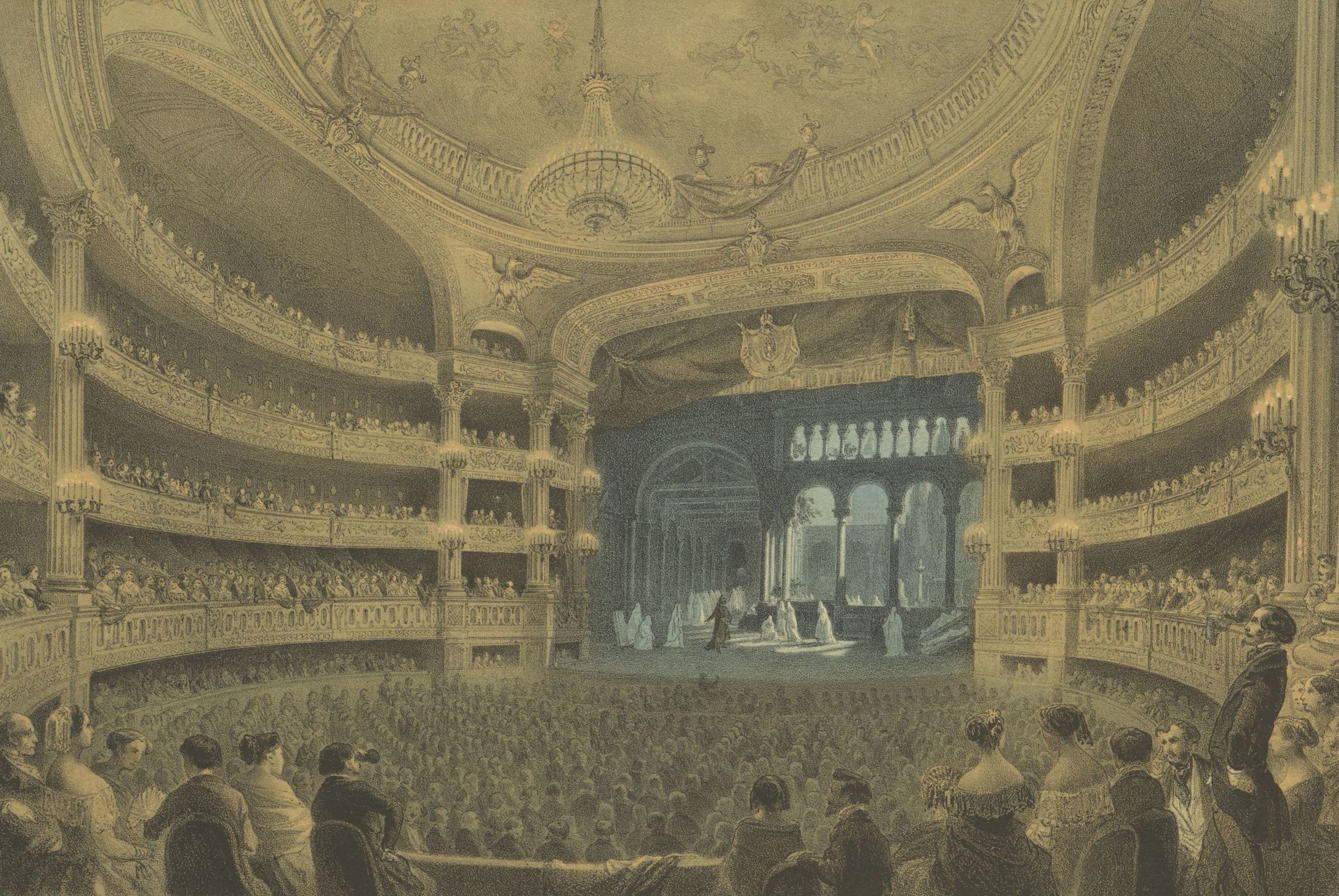
Louis-Jules Arnout's lithograph of Act 3 scene 2 of Robert (the "Ballet of the Nuns") at the Paris Opéra (Salle Le Peletier), 1831

The name Giacomo Meyerbeer first became known internationally with his opera Il crociato in Egitto—premiered in Venice in 1824 and produced in London and Paris in 1825; incidentally, it was the last opera ever written to feature a castrato, and the last to require keyboard accompaniment for recitatives. This 'breakthrough' in Paris was exactly what Meyerbeer had been aiming for over the past ten years; he had been carefully preparing for it, developing contacts, and fully reaped his reward.

In 1826, shortly after the death of his father, Meyerbeer married his cousin, Minna Mosson (1804–1886). The marriage which may have been 'dynastic' in its origins turned out to be stable and devoted; the couple were to have five children, of whom the three youngest (all daughters) survived to adulthood. In the same year, following the death of Carl Maria von Weber, Weber's widow asked Meyerbeer to complete her husband's unfinished comic opera Die drei Pintos. This was to cause him much trouble over future years, as he found the material insufficient to work on. Eventually, in 1852 he settled the matter with Weber's heirs by handing them Weber's drafts and cash compensation. (The opera was later completed by Gustav Mahler).

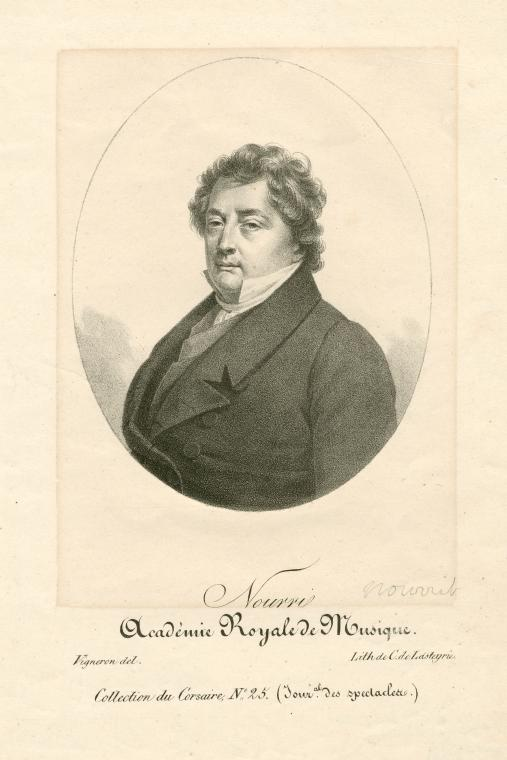
Adolphe Nourrit

With his next opera Meyerbeer became virtually a superstar. Robert le diable (with libretto by Eugène Scribe and Germain Delavigne), produced in Paris in 1831, was one of the earliest grand operas. The libretto, originally planned in 1827 as a three-act opéra comique for the Opéra-Comique theatre, was refashioned after 1829 in a five-act form to meet the requirements of the Paris Opéra. Its revised characterisation as a 'grand opera' placed it in succession to Auber's La muette de Portici (1828) and Rossini's Guillaume Tell (1829) in this new genre. The composer undertook further work on the opera in early 1831 adding ballet episodes, including the "Ballet of Nuns", which was to prove one of the opera's great sensations, becoming an early example of the ballet blanc genre. He also rewrote the two major male roles of Bertrand and Robert to suit the talents of Nicolas Levasseur and Adolphe Nourrit, respectively. At the invitation of Nourrit, Cornélie Falcon made her debut at the age of 18 at the Opéra in the role of Alice on 20 July 1832, and she made a vivid impression on the public, which included on that night Auber, Berlioz, Halévy, Maria Malibran, Giulia Grisi, Honoré Daumier, Alexandre Dumas and Victor Hugo. On hearing her in the role, Meyerbeer himself declared his opera at last 'complete'.

The success of the opera led to Meyerbeer himself becoming a celebrity. In January 1832 he was awarded membership of the Légion d'honneur. This success – coupled with Meyerbeer's known family wealth – inevitably also precipitated envy amongst his peers. Berlioz – who had commented that "Meyerbeer not only had the luck to be talented, he had the talent to be lucky" – wrote "I can't forget that Meyerbeer was only able to persuade [the Opéra] to put on Robert le diable ... by paying the administration sixty thousand francs of his own money"; and Frédéric Chopin lamented "Meyerbeer had to work for three years and pay his own expenses for his stay in Paris before Robert le diable could be staged....Three years, that's a lot – it's too much." (Note: Both cited in Conway (2012), pp. 252–3. Both Veron and Meyerbeer however were later to deny the rumours that the composer had subsidized the production – see Becker (1989), pp. 147–8) King Frederick William III of Prussia who attended the second performance of Robert le diable, swiftly invited him to compose a German opera, and Meyerbeer was invited to stage Robert in Berlin. Within a few years the opera had been staged with success all over Europe, and also in the USA.

The fusion of dramatic music, melodramatic plot, and sumptuous staging in Robert le diable proved a sure-fire formula, as did the partnership with Scribe, which Meyerbeer would go on to repeat in Les Huguenots, Le prophète, and L'Africaine. All of these operas held the international stage throughout the 19th century, as did the more pastoral Dinorah (1859), making Meyerbeer the most frequently performed composer at leading opera houses in the nineteenth century.

=== Between Paris and Berlin ===
==== 1832–1839 ====
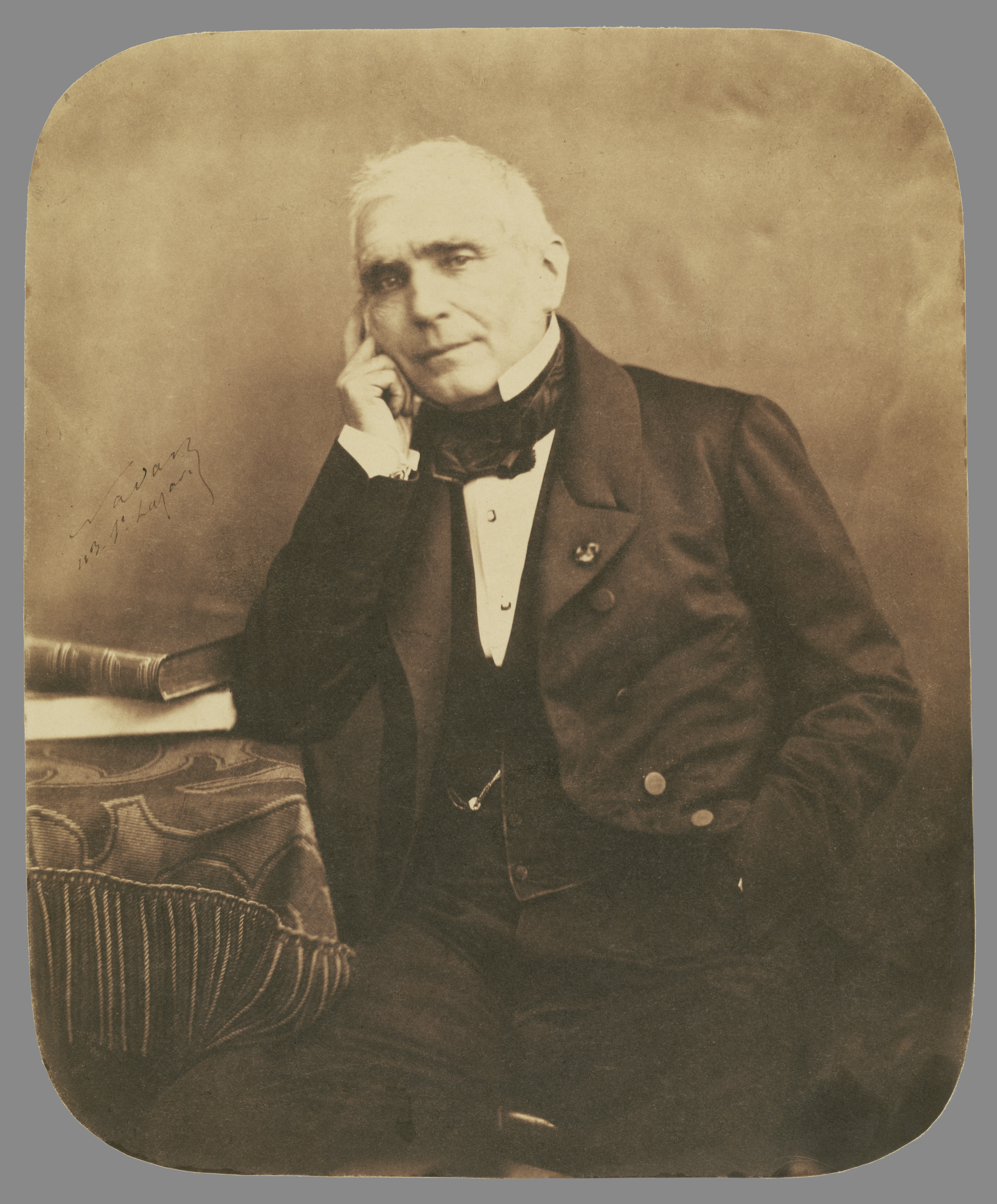
Eugène Scribe

Letellier describes Meyerbeer's mature life as "a tale of two cities...His artistic triumph and legendary status were achieved in Paris...but he never abandoned Prussia, especially his home city of Berlin". His wife Minna was based in Berlin (she did not enjoy Paris) as was his beloved mother; and he had a series of royal duties from the Prussian court, stemming from his appointment as Court Kapellmeister in 1832. For these reasons his life from 1830 onwards is characterised by travel between these two centres.

In Paris Meyerbeer had been asked by Louis Véron, the director of the Opéra, for a new work. At first, he attempted to persuade Véron to accept the opéra-comique Le portefaix to a libretto by Scribe, (Note: Eventually set by the composer José Melchor Gomis (1835).) which he had been contracted to compose in early 1831; but Véron insisted on a full five-act piece. Together with Scribe, Meyerbeer reviewed many subjects before deciding, in 1832, on Les Huguenots. The contract which Meyerbeer signed with Véron contained a penalty clause if the work was not delivered by the end of 1833. When the time came and the opera was not ready, Véron claimed his 30,000 francs under this clause; Meyerbeer was perhaps unique amongst composers in being able to pay this. In fact, Véron refunded the money under a further agreement, when the opera was delivered in late 1834; but Veron himself was replaced as director of the Opera by Henri Duponchel before Les Huguenots was premiered on 29 February 1836. It was an immediate and immense success, its splendid staging and effects exceeding even those of Fromental Halévy's La Juive, which had premiered the previous year. Berlioz called the score "a musical encyclopaedia", and the singing, especially of Nourrit and Falcon, was universally praised. Les Huguenots was the first opera to be performed at the Opéra more than 1,000 times (the 1,000th performance being on 16 May 1906) and continued to be produced up to 1936, more than a century after its premiere. Its many performances in all other of the world's major opera houses give it a claim to being the most successful opera of the 19th century.

However, in Berlin Meyerbeer faced many problems, including the enmity of the jealous Gaspare Spontini, who since 1820 had been Court Kapellmeister and director of the Berlin Hofoper. Complaints were made in the Berlin press about the delay of the Berlin premiere of Robert le diable (which finally took place in June 1832), and Meyerbeer's music was decried by the critic and poet Ludwig Rellstab. There was no sign of the German opera expected from Meyerbeer. Moreover, reactionary censorship laws prevented the production of Les Huguenots in Berlin (and indeed in many other cities of Germany). Nevertheless, Meyerbeer, who (as he wrote to a friend) 'years ago...swore to myself never to respond personally to attacks on my work, and never under any circumstances to cause or respond to personal polemics', refused to be drawn on any of these matters.

Meanwhile, in Paris Meyerbeer began to seek new libretti, initially considering Le prophète by Scribe, and Le cinq mars by Henri Saint-Georges and eventually settling on Scribe's Vasco da Gama (later to become L'Africaine), which he contracted to complete by 1840. However, Meyerbeer had envisaged that the main role in L'Africaine would be written for Falcon; after the catastrophic failure of her voice in 1837, he turned instead to Le prophète.

On 20 August 1839, Meyerbeer, whilst relaxing at Boulogne in the company of Moscheles, met for the first time with Richard Wagner, who was en route to Paris. Their ensuing relationship (see below) was to have major repercussions for the careers and reputations of both. At this meeting Wagner read to Meyerbeer from the libretto of Rienzi, and Meyerbeer agreed to look through the score, which indeed he subsequently recommended for performance at Dresden.

==== The 1840s ====
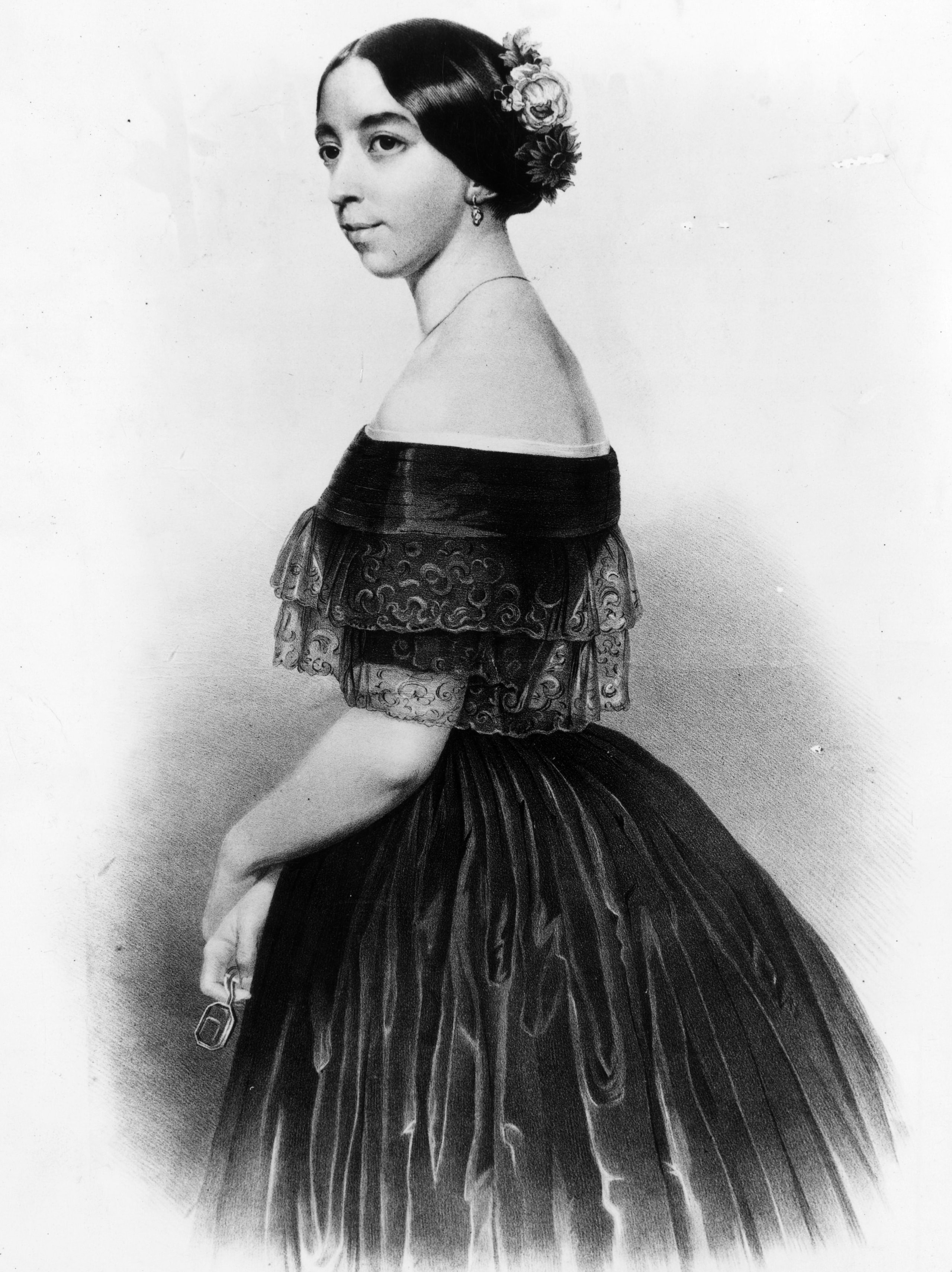
Pauline Viardot

By the end of 1841, Meyerbeer had completed the first draft of Le prophète, but refused to stage it because the then director of the opera, Leon Pillet, wished to cast his mistress, Rosine Stoltz, in the part of Fidès, the hero's mother. (Berlioz characterised Stoltz as 'la Directrice du Directeur'). Meyerbeer insisted on Pauline Viardot for the role. Meyerbeer lodged the score with a Parisian lawyer, and refused to countenance any production until his wishes were met. Only in 1849 was the Opéra willing to agree to his conditions. Meyerbeer was unique in his time in having the wealth and influence to impose his will as a composer in this way.

In the meantime, the situation in Prussia was changing. Following the death of Frederick William III, the new regime of Frederick William IV was far more liberal. Spontini was dismissed, and the Berlin premiere of Les Huguenots was arranged (20 May 1842). On the instigation of Alexander von Humboldt, Meyerbeer was installed later in the year as Prussian Generalmusikdirektor and director of music for the Royal Court. (Note: Heinrich Heine wrote satirically following this appointment: "Lately [Spontini] was found in the upper halls of the Louvre…before a great mummy, whose magnificent gold mask proclaimed a monarch who could be no less than [he] under whose rule the children of Israel left the land of Egypt… At last breaking silence, [he] spoke as follows to his distinguished fellow-mummy: 'Unhappy Pharaoh, cause of my misfortunes! Hadst thou not suffered … Israel to depart from … Egypt, or if thou hadst only drowned them in the Nile…It has come to pass, in consequence of thy half-way measures, that I am now a ruined man, and Moses and Halévy and Mendelssohn and Meyerbeer have now conquered'" (Heine (1893), pp. 435–6)) Meyerbeer wrote a number of works for court occasions, and also provided music, at the king's request, for the first staging in Berlin in 1856 of his brother Michael's play Struensee (based on the life of Johann Friedrich Struensee), which had also been proscribed under the previous regime.

In 1843 the Berlin Opera house burned down. The creation of the new building gave a new opportunity to commission a German opera from Meyerbeer. The subject of the opera, Ein Feldlager in Schlesien (A Silesian Encampment), was an episode in the life of Frederick the Great. As this patriotic opera 'needed' Prussian creators, Meyerbeer arranged that whilst the trusted Scribe would write the libretto, Rellstab would translate it and take the credit (and the royalties). This had the added advantage of winning over the formerly hostile Rellstab. Meyerbeer had hoped to have Jenny Lind (for whom he had written the part) sing the lead role of Vielka, but the opera premiered on 7 December 1844 without her (although she did appear in subsequent performances). The libretto was revised by Charlotte Birch-Pfeiffer to a Bohemian background as Vielka for a production in Vienna (1847). (In a further incarnation, the music was later used by Meyerbeer for a revamped libretto by Scribe featuring Peter the Great, and produced as an opéra comique in Paris (L'étoile du nord, 1854)).

With the continuing delays in the production of Le prophète and L'Africaine, Meyerbeer was now becoming subject to increasing sniping in Paris. In 1846 Meyerbeer began work on a new project with Scribe and Saint-Georges, Noëma, but in the following year Pillet was sacked from the opera and the direction was resumed by Duponchel. As a consequence, Meyerbeer was at last able to stage Le prophète with a cast to his liking, (including Viardot as Fidès), and it premiered on 16 April 1849. Again Meyerbeer's new opera was an outstanding success – despite the unusual feature of the lead female role being the hero's mother, rather than his lover. Amongst those at the 47th performance in February 1850 was Richard Wagner, now an impoverished political exile; the success of a work so fundamentally against his own operatic principles was one of the spurs to his spiteful anti-Jewish denunciation of Meyerbeer and Mendelssohn, Das Judenthum in der Musik (1850).

==== Last years ====
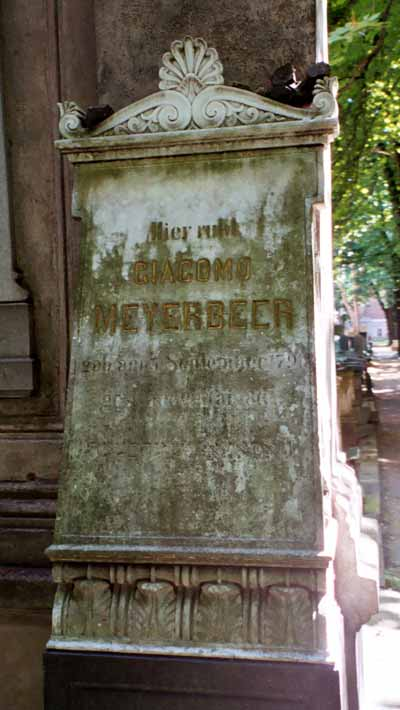
Meyerbeer's grave in Berlin

Increasing ill health (or possibly hypochondria) now began to restrict Meyerbeer's output and activities. The death of his beloved mother in 1854 was also a blow. However, the success of L'étoile du nord in 1854 demonstrated that he could still pack the theatres. Following this he began on two new projects, an opera by Scribe based on the biblical story of Judith, and an opéra comique, Le pardon de Ploërmel, (also known as Dinorah, the title given to the Italian version performed at London) to a libretto by Jules Barbier. The latter premiered on 4 April 1859 at the Opéra Comique in Paris; the former, like many previous projects, remained only as sketches. The death of Scribe in 1861 was a further disincentive to Meyerbeer to proceed with his operatic work in progress. In 1862, in accordance with his original contract with Scribe, he paid Scribe's widow compensation for not completing Judith.

Nevertheless, Meyerbeer's last years saw the composition of a good deal of non-operatic music, including a Coronation March for William I of Prussia, (1861), an overture for the 1862 International Exhibition in London, and incidental music (now lost) to Henry Blaze de Bury's play La jeunesse de Goethe (1860). He composed a few settings of liturgical material, including one of the 91st Psalm (1853); and also choral works for the synagogue at Paris.

Meyerbeer died in Paris on 2 May 1864. Rossini, who, not having heard the news, came to his apartment the next day intending to meet him, was shocked and fainted. He was moved to write on the spot a choral tribute (Pleure, pleure, muse sublime!). A special train bore Meyerbeer's body from the Gare du Nord to Berlin on 6 May, where he was buried in the family vault at the Jewish cemetery in Schönhauser Allee.

L'Africaine was eventually premiered after Meyerbeer's death at the Salle Le Peletier on 28 April 1865 in a performing edition undertaken by François-Joseph Fétis.

== Personality and beliefs ==
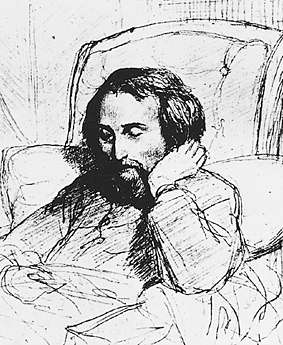
Heinrich Heine on his sickbed, 1851

Meyerbeer's immense wealth (increased by the success of his operas) and his continuing adherence to his Jewish religion set him apart somewhat from many of his musical contemporaries. They also gave rise to rumours that his success was due to his bribing musical critics. (Note: Becker comments: "It is often maintained that Meyerbeer bribed the press, but in fact he had no need to. Journalists like [the critics] Fiorentino, Scudo and Spazier, who were normally in financial difficulties, put themselves in his power by their persistent demands for loans" (Becker (1980), p. 253)) Richard Wagner (see below) accused him of being interested only in money, not music. Meyerbeer was, however, a deeply serious musician and a sensitive personality. He philosophically resigned himself to being a victim of his own success: his extensive diaries and correspondence – which survived the turmoil of 20th-century Europe and have now been published in eight volumes – are an invaluable source for the history of music and theatre in the composer's time.

Meyerbeer's personal attachment to Judaism was a mature personal decision – after the death of his maternal grandfather in 1811 he wrote to his mother: "Please accept from me a promise that I will always live in the religion in which he died." In his diaries he noted significant family events including birthdays, not by their Gregorian calendar occurrence, but by their Jewish calendar dates. Moreover, he was regularly subject to antisemitic hostility throughout his life (see below), warning his brothers frequently in his letters against richess (Yiddish for "Jew-hatred"). Writing to Heinrich Heine in 1839, he offered a sobering view:

I believe that richess is like love in the theatres and novels: no matter how often one encounters it...it never misses its target if effectively wielded...[Nothing] can grow back the foreskin of which we are robbed on the eighth day of life; those who, on the ninth day, do not bleed from this operation shall continue to bleed an entire lifetime, even after death.

It was perhaps this attitude that led Meyerbeer never to enter public controversy with those who antagonized him, either professionally or personally, although he occasionally displayed his grudges in his Diaries; for example, on hearing Robert Schumann conduct in 1850: "I saw for the first time the man who, as a critic, has persecuted me for twelve years with a deadly enmity."

In his mature operas, Meyerbeer selected stories which almost invariably featured as a major element of storyline a hero living within a hostile environment. Robert, Raoul the Huguenot, Jean the prophet, and the defiant Vasco da Gama in L'Africaine are all "outsiders". It has been suggested that "Meyerbeer's choice of these topics is not accidental; they reflect his own sense of living in a potentially inimical society."

Meyerbeer's relationship with Heine displays the awkwardness and prickliness of the social personae of both parties. Meyerbeer, apart from any of his personal feelings, needed Heine onside as an influential personality and writer on music. He genuinely admired Heine's verse, and made a number of settings from it. Heine, living in Paris from 1830, was always equivocal about his loyalties between Judaism and Christianity, and always short of money, asked Meyerbeer to intervene with Heine's own family for financial support and frequently took loans and money from Meyerbeer himself. He was not above threatening Meyerbeer with blackmail by writing satirical pieces about him (and indeed Meyerbeer paid Heine's widow to suppress such writings). And yet, at Heine's death in 1856, Meyerbeer wrote in his diary: "Peace be to his ashes. I forgive him from my heart for his ingratitude and many wickednesses against me."

== Music and theatre ==
=== Music ===
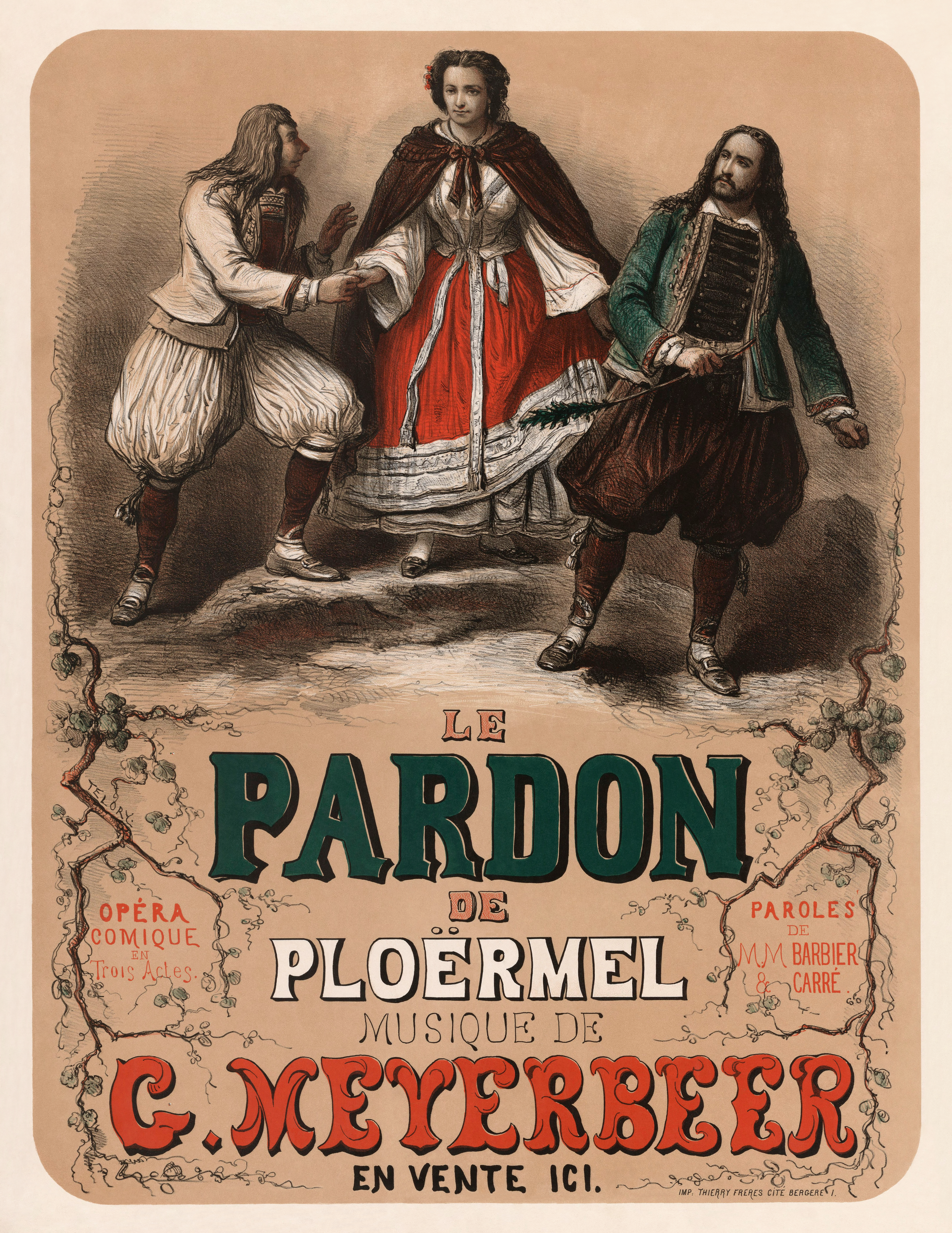
Advertisement for the sheet music of Le pardon de Ploërmel (Dinorah)

Meyerbeer did not operate on the basis of any theory or philosophy of music and was not an innovator in harmony or musical form. In the words of John H. Roberts: "He had a rich fund of appealing if somewhat short-breathed melody, commanded an increasingly rich harmonic vocabulary, and was a master of brilliant and novel orchestral effect. But he had very limited skill in thematic development and even less in contrapuntal combination."

All of his significant music is for the voice (opera and songs) and this reflects his detailed grounding in Italian opera. Throughout his career he wrote his operas with specific singers in mind and took great care to temper his writing to their strengths; but at the same time he seemed little interested in expressing the emotions of his characters, preferring to use his music to underline the larger-scale machinations of the plot. In this way he was close to the ideas of his teacher Vogler, himself renowned for his dramatic depictions of nature and incidents in keyboard music, who wrote in 1779 that: "writing beautifully is easy; expression is not too difficult; but only the genius of a great painter...can choose for each picture agreeable and natural colours that are particular to it." Indeed, Meyerbeer's devotion to the voice often led him to ignore the dramatic cohesion of his operas; typically, he would write far too much music and the scores of his operas would have to be drastically cut during rehearsals. (The lengthy overture to Le prophète had to be cut in its entirety, surviving only in a piano arrangement by Charles-Valentin Alkan.)

The first signs of Meyerbeer breaking with the Italian traditions in which he had trained are in Il crociato in Egitto. Amongst other notable features of the opera were its lavish orchestral forces (extending to two onstage military bands in the final act). The grandiosity of the work reflected the need to make an impact on the sophisticated and technologically advanced stages of London and Paris, for which it was extensively rewritten. Meyerbeer's contribution was revealed at this stage to be the combination of Italian vocal lines, German orchestration and harmony, and the use of contemporary theatrical techniques, ideas which he carried forward in Robert and his later works. However Meyerbeer's background in the Italian operatic traditions can be clearly seen as late as 1859 in the 'mad scene' in Dinorah (the virtuoso aria Ombre légère).

Typical of Meyerbeer's innovative orchestration is the use in Robert le diable of dark-toned instruments – bassoons, timpani and low brass, including ophicleide – to characterise the diabolical nature of Bertram and his associates. At one point the arrival of a character is announced by a combination of three solo timpani and pizzicato double-basses. Similar adventurousness is shown in Les Huguenots where the composer uses a solo bass clarinet and solo viola d'amore to accompany arias. For Le prophète, Meyerbeer considered using the newly invented saxophone. Becker suggests that Meyerbeer in all his grand operas often: 'created a deliberately 'unbeautiful' sound.....with unusual orchestration designed to express ...content rather than produce a sensuous sound' and opines that this explains much of the criticism he received from German writers on music.

=== Theatre ===
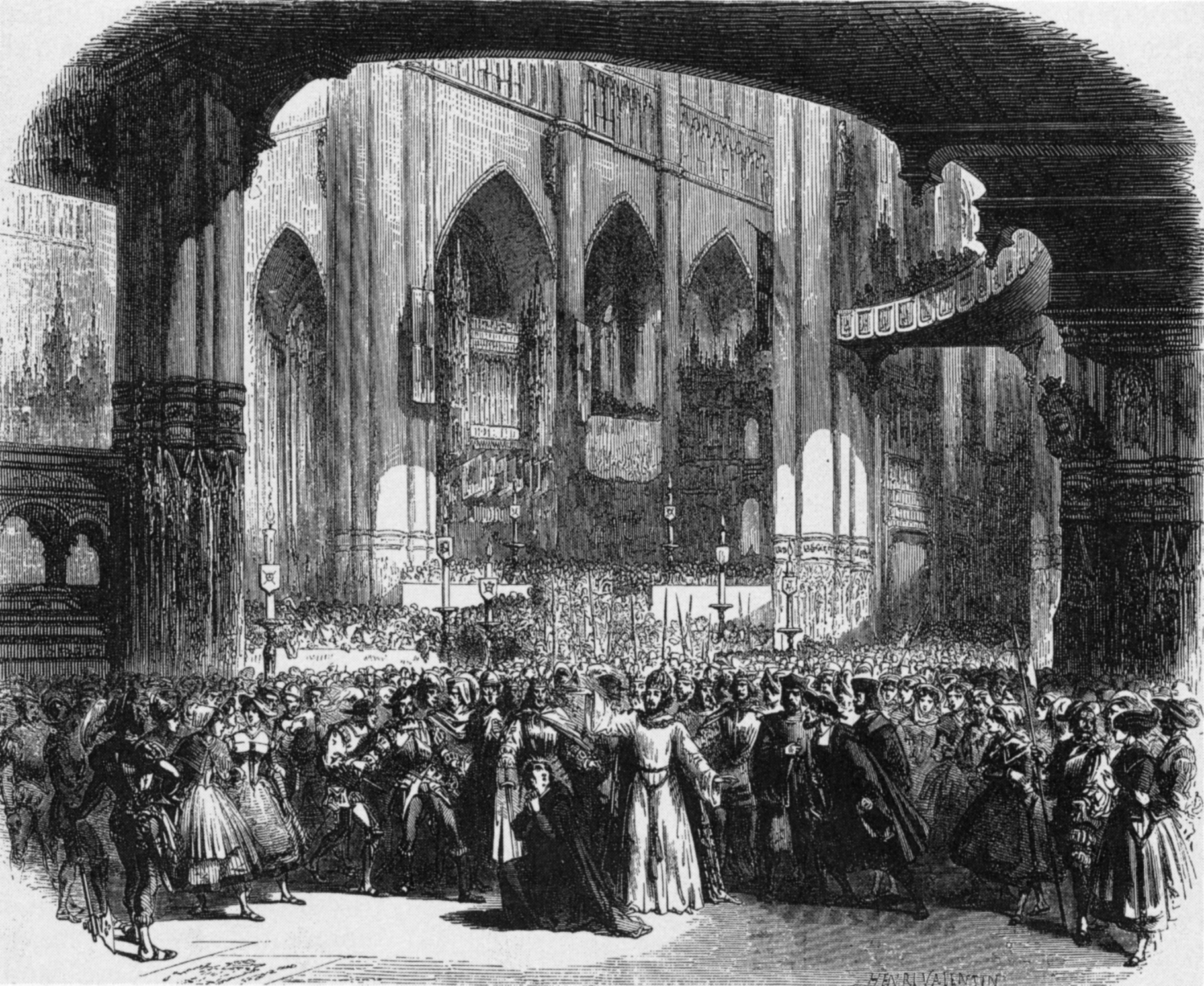
Le prophète – Act 4, scene 2, of the original production, set design by Charles-Antoine Cambon and Joseph Thierry

Meyerbeer's concern to integrate musical power with all the resources of contemporary theatre anticipated in some ways the ideas of Wagner's Gesamtkunstwerk. Becker writes:

Wagner's idea of music drama...was originally developed by way of grand opera...his ideas could never have been realised in their particular form without the pioneering development[s]...that Meyerbeer's operas were the first to demand.

Meyerbeer was always concerned to intensify the theatricality of his operas, even when new ideas emerged at a relatively late stage in the music's composition. An example of his receptiveness was the addition of the provocative "Ballet of the Nuns" in the third act of Robert le diable, at the suggestion of Duponchel. The set for the ballet was an innovative and striking design by Duponchel and Pierre-Luc-Charles Ciceri. Duponchel had also introduced technical innovations for the staging, including 'English traps' for the sudden appearance and disappearance of the ghosts. (Meyerbeer was led in fact to complain that the spectacle was too much and was pushing his music into the background). In Le prophète, the skating ballet, which created a great sensation, was composed after rehearsals had begun, in order to capitalise on the new craze for roller skates. The theatre was also able to use new electrical lighting effects to create a powerful sunrise, and to depict the conflagration which ends the opera.

Meyerbeer's large choral "tableaux" also made a major contribution to the overall dramatic effect; the composer particularly sought opportunities to write such large-scale crowd scenes, and preferred libretti which offered such possibilities. Crosten writes: "These massive developed sections are the chief glory of the Meyerbeerian opera, for they are not only big in volume but big in their structural design."

Mention should also be made of Meyerbeer's intense concern with the business of opera, which indeed had formed part of his studies under Vogler. This gave him the background not only to deal with complex contractual issues and to negotiate with publishers but extended to wooing the press and "marketing" in general. Indeed, he was probably the originator of the "press conference" at which journalists were fed refreshments and information. This marketing and commercialisation of opera was reinforced by Meyerbeer's Paris publisher Maurice Schlesinger who had established his fortune on the back of Robert, and even persuaded Honoré de Balzac to write a novella (Gambara) to promote Les Huguenots. Schlesinger's publication of Franz Liszt's Reminiscences de Robert le diable sold out on the day of issue and was immediately reprinted. Such manoeuvres did little to endear Meyerbeer to his fellow artists, and indeed engendered envious comments of the sort already quoted from Berlioz and Chopin.

== Reception ==
=== Musical influence ===
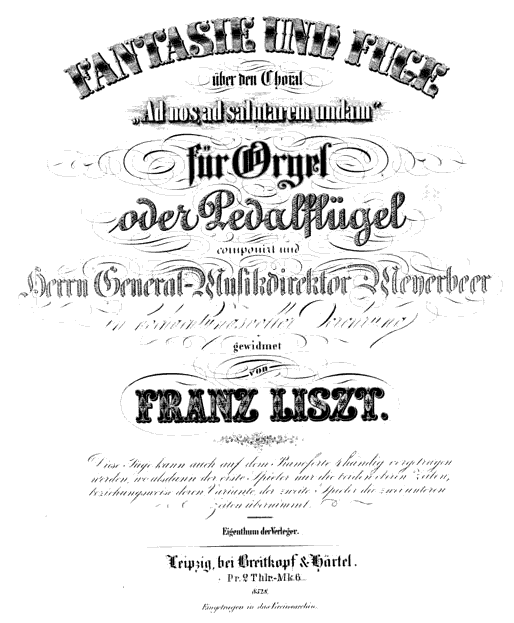
Cover of the first edition of Liszt's Fantasy and Fugue on the chorale "Ad nos, ad salutarem undam"

Meyerbeer had no pupils and no direct "school". Yet as his works spanned the golden age of grand opera, clear traces of his influence can be found in the grand operas of Fromental Halévy, Gaetano Donizetti, Giuseppe Verdi and others. After 1850, Huebner notes a continuing tradition of operas at Paris where 'principals appear with chorus at the end of an act and where private intrigue conjoins a well-articulated public dimension in the plot' and cites amongst others Charles Gounod's La nonne sanglante (1854), Ambroise Thomas's Hamlet and operas by Jules Massenet, amongst them Le roi de Lahore (1877) and Le Cid (1885). The line of succession was however virtually washed away in the tide of Wagner in Paris after 1890 (see below). The influence of Meyerbeer has also been detected in the operas of Antonín Dvořák and other Czech composers, and in the operas of Russian composers including Rimsky-Korsakov and the young Tchaikovsky, who thought Les Huguenots "one of the greatest works in the repertoire".

Themes from Meyerbeer's works were used by many contemporary composers, often in the form of keyboard paraphrases or fantasies. Perhaps the most elaborate and substantial of these is Franz Liszt's monumental Fantasy and Fugue on the chorale "Ad nos, ad salutarem undam", S. 259 (1852), for organ or pédalier, based on the chorale of the Anabaptist priests in Le prophète and dedicated to Meyerbeer. The work was also published in a version for piano duet (S. 624) which was much later arranged for solo piano by Ferruccio Busoni.

Liszt also wrote piano works based on Robert le diable, notably the Réminiscences de Robert le diable subtitled Valse infernale. He also transcribed two pieces from L'Africaine, as "Illustrations de l'opéra L'Africaine". Frédéric Chopin and Auguste Franchomme jointly composed a Grand duo concertant on themes from the opera, for cello and piano, in 1832, and the Italian pianist and composer Adolfo Fumagalli composed an elaborate fantasy on the opera for left hand alone as his Op. 106. Other pieces based on the opera included works by Adolf von Henselt and Jean-Amédée Méreaux. Similar works, of varying musical quality, were churned out by composers for each of the further operas in attempts to cash in on their success.

=== Critical reception ===
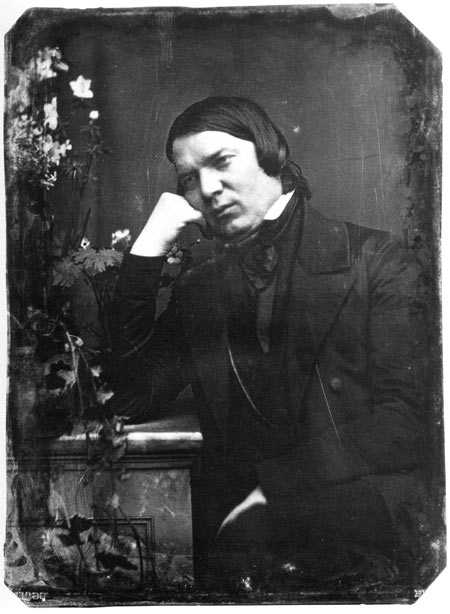
Robert Schumann in an 1850 daguerreotype

Meyerbeer's operas consistently enjoyed enormous popularity during his lifetime, and the verdict of (the then pro-Meyerbeer) Wagner in 1841, when the Paris Opéra was vainly awaiting Le prophète and L'Africaine, was not atypical:

The Paris Opéra lies dying. It looks for its salvation to the German Messiah, Meyerbeer; if he keeps it waiting much longer, its death agonies will begin...It is for that reason...that one only sees Robert le Diable and Les Huguenots turning up again when the mediocrities are forced to withdraw.

However, dissenting voices were heard from critics. Not all of these however were on musical grounds. Berlioz for example raised the issue of the inhibiting effects of Meyerbeer's success (which he felt particularly as one who struggled to get his works performed): "The pressure [Meyerbeer] exerts on managers, artists and critics, and consequently on the Paris public, at least as much by his immense wealth as by his eclectic talent, makes all serious success at the Opéra virtually impossible. This baneful influence may still be felt ten years after his death: Heinrich Heine maintains he has 'paid in advance'."

Mendelssohn disapproved of Meyerbeer's works on moral grounds, believing Robert le diable to be 'ignoble'.

Schumann's attack on Les Huguenots was clearly a personal diatribe against Meyerbeer's Judaism: "Time and time again we had to turn away in disgust...One may search in vain for a sustained pure thought, a truly Christian sentiment...It is all contrived, all make believe and hypocrisy!...The shrewdest of composers rubs his hands with glee."

Wagner's disciple Theodor Uhlig followed Schumann's Judaeophobic line in his 1850 review of Le prophète: "To a good Christian [it] is at best contrived, exaggerated, unnatural and slick, and it is not possible that the practised propaganda of the Hebrew art-taste can succeed using such means." Uhlig's phrase 'the Hebrew art-taste' was to be used by Richard Wagner to spark off his attack on Meyerbeer, Das Judenthum in der Musik (Jewishness in Music) (see below).

In 1911, the composer Charles Villiers Stanford cited Meyerbeer's music as an example of the dangers he believed lay in improvising at the piano without a clear plan, (although there is in fact no evidence to suggest Meyerbeer worked in this way), writing: 'Man of genius though he was, as any man who wrote the fourth act of the Huguenots must have been, Meyerbeer is a sign-post of this danger of trusting to the pianoforte as a medium of inspiration.'

=== Wagner's campaign against Meyerbeer ===
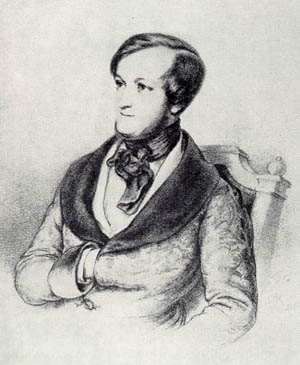
Richard Wagner around the time of his first meeting with Meyerbeer – portrait by Ernst Benedikt Kietz, c. 1840

The vitriolic campaign of Richard Wagner against Meyerbeer was to a great extent responsible for the decline of Meyerbeer's popularity after his death in 1864. This campaign was as much a matter of personal spite as of racism – Wagner had learnt a great deal from Meyerbeer and indeed Wagner's early opera Rienzi (1842) was facetiously called by Hans von Bülow 'Meyerbeer's best opera'. Meyerbeer supported the young Wagner, both financially and in helping to obtain the premiere productions of both Rienzi and The Flying Dutchman at Dresden.

Wagner's early correspondence with Meyerbeer, up to 1846, is described by historian David Conway as "cringingly obsequious". However, from the early 1840s, as Wagner developed Tannhäuser and Lohengrin, his ideas on opera increasingly diverged from Meyerbeerean standards; even in 1843 Wagner had written to Schumann condemning Meyerbeer's work as 'a striving after superficial popularity'. During 1846 Meyerbeer turned down Wagner's application for a loan of 1,200 thalers, and this may have marked a turning point.

In particular, after 1849, Wagner resented Meyerbeer's continuing success at a time when his own vision of German opera had little chance of prospering. After the May Uprising in Dresden of 1849, Wagner was for some years a political refugee facing a prison sentence or worse should he return to Saxony. During his period of living in exile, he had few sources of income and little opportunity of getting his own works performed. The success of Le prophète sent Wagner over the edge, and he was also deeply envious of Meyerbeer's wealth. In reaction he published, under a pseudonym, his 1850 essay Jewishness in Music. Without specifically naming Meyerbeer, he interpreted the popular success of the latter as the undermining of German music by alleged Jewish venality and willingness to cater to the lowest tastes, and attributed the supposed poor quality of such 'Jewish music' to Jewish speech and song patterns, which 'though the cultured son of Jewry takes untold pains to strip them off, nevertheless they shew an impertinent obstinacy in cleaving to him'.

In his major theoretical statement, Opera and Drama (1852), Wagner objected to the music of Meyerbeer, asserting its superficiality and incoherence in dramatic terms; this work contains Wagner's well-known put-down of Meyerbeer's operas as 'effects without causes'. It also contains the sardonic crack that '[Rossini] never could have dreamt that it would someday occur to the Bankers, for whom he had always made their music, to make it for themselves'. Jewishness in Music was reissued in 1869, after Meyerbeer's death, in an extended form and with a far more explicit attack on Meyerbeer. This version was under Wagner's own name – and as Wagner had by now a far greater reputation, his views obtained far wider publicity. These attacks on Meyerbeer (which also included swipes at Felix Mendelssohn) are regarded by Paul Lawrence Rose as a significant milestone in the growth of German anti-Semitism.

As Wagner prospered, it became second nature for him, his wife Cosima and the Wagner circle to deprecate Meyerbeer and his works, and Cosima's Diaries contain numerous instances of this – (as well as recording a dream of Wagner's in which he and Meyerbeer were reconciled). Wagner's autobiography Mein Leben, circulated amongst his friends (and published openly in 1911), contains constant sniping at Meyerbeer and concludes with Wagner receiving the news of Meyerbeer's death, and his companions' gratification at the news. The downgrading of Meyerbeer became a commonplace amongst Wagnerites: in 1898, George Bernard Shaw, in The Perfect Wagnerite, commented that: "Nowadays young people cannot understand how anyone could have taken Meyerbeer's influence seriously."

Thus as Wagner's stock rose, Meyerbeer's fell. In 1890, the year before the Paris premiere of Wagner's Lohengrin, there were no Wagner performances at the Paris Opéra, and 32 performances of Meyerbeer's four grand operas. In 1909, there were 60 Wagner performances, and only three of Meyerbeer's (Les Huguenots being the sole work performed).

=== Reevaluation ===
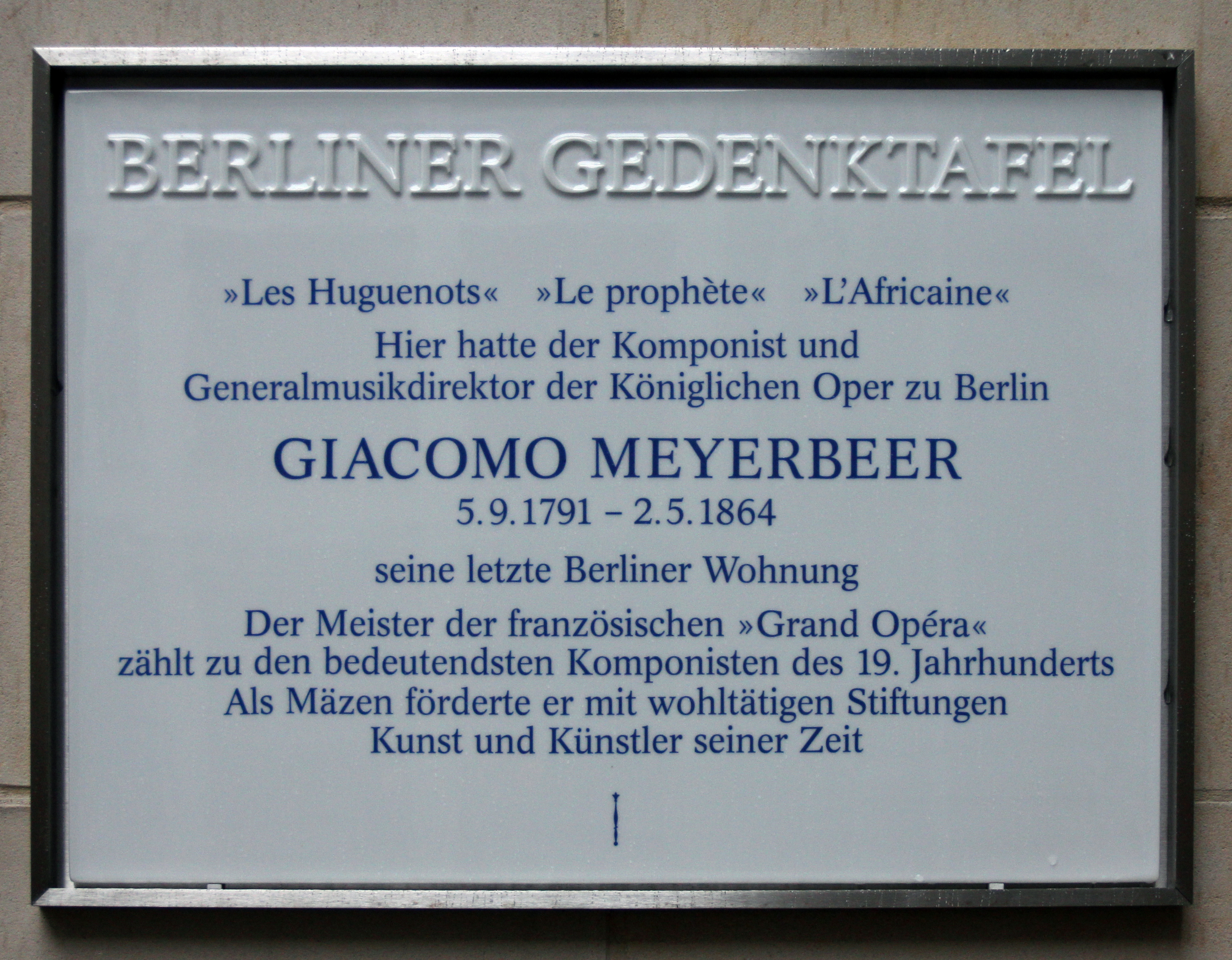
Berlin memorial plaque, Pariser Platz 6a, Berlin-Mitte, Germany

Meyerbeer's costly operas, requiring grand casts of leading singers, were gradually dropped from the repertoire in the early 20th century. They were banned in Germany from 1933, and subsequently in subject countries, by the Nazi regime because the composer was Jewish, (Note: Meyerbeer is given a four-page entry (columns 186–193), in the Nazi bible of forbidden Jewish music, Lexikon der Juden in der Musik (ed. Theophil Stengel and Herbert Gerigk, Berlin:Hahnefeld, 1941). This entry quotes extensively from Wagner and Schumann, and from contemporary Nazi musicologists.) and this was a major factor in their further disappearance from the repertory.

One of the first serious post-war studies of Meyerbeer and grand opera was Crosten's 1948 book Grand Opera: An Art and a Business which laid out the themes and standards for much subsequent research. A major contribution to the revival of interest in Meyerbeer was the work of the scholar Heinz Becker, leading to the complete publication, between 1960 and 2006, of Meyerbeer's complete diaries and correspondence in German, which are an important source for musical history of the era. The English scholar Robert Letellier has translated the diaries and undertaken a wide range of Meyerbeer studies. The establishment of a 'Meyerbeer Fan Club' in America also stimulated interest.

Most importantly the operas themselves have been revived and recorded, although despite the efforts of such champions as Dame Joan Sutherland, who took part in performances of, and recorded, Les Huguenots, they have yet to achieve anything like the huge popular following they attracted during their creator's lifetime. Recordings are now available of all the operas from Il crociato onwards, for many of the earlier Italian operas, and for other pieces including his songs and the incidental music for Struensee.

Amongst the reasons often adduced for the dearth of productions in the 20th century were the scale of Meyerbeer's more ambitious works and the cost of mounting them, as well as the alleged lack of virtuoso singers capable of doing justice to Meyerbeer's demanding music. However, successful productions of some of the major operas at relatively small centres such as Strasbourg (L'Africaine, 2004) and Metz (Les Huguenots, 2004) showed that this conventional wisdom can be challenged. Since then, there have been highly successful new productions of Les Huguenots at major opera houses in France, Belgium and Germany. The Paris Opera opened a new production of Les Huguenots in September 2018, the first time since 1936 for the opera to be performed there. In December 2012, the Royal Opera House in London premiered its first performance of Robert le diable in 120 years. In 2013, Meyerbeer's original version of L'Africaine in a new critical edition by Jürgen Schläder was performed by Chemnitz Opera under the original title Vasco de Gama. The production was a success with audiences and critics and won the poll of German critics award presented by Opernwelt magazine annually as "Rediscovery of the year" in 2013. The critical edition was also used for a high-profile new production at the Deutsche Oper Berlin in October 2015. From 2015 onwards, new productions of Le prophète began to appear at some European opera houses.

On 9 September 2013 a plaque to mark Meyerbeer's last residence was put up at Pariser Platz 6a, Berlin.

German soprano Andrea Chudak, devoted much of her work to his music since 2010s. She founded the Giacomo Meyerbeer Society and released several albums of his music.

== Selected honours and awards ==
1813 – Awarded title of Court and Chamber composer to Louis II, Grand Duke of Hesse.
1836 – Created Knight in the Order of Leopold, by Royal Order of King Leopold I.
1842 – Awarded Pour le Mérite for sciences and arts (Prussia).
1842 – Awarded Order of the Oak Crown by King William II of the Netherlands.
1842 – Created Knight of the Order of the Polar Star by King Oscar I of Sweden.
1850 – Awarded Honorary Doctorate in Philosophy by the University of Jena.

== On film ==
Vernon Dobtcheff played the role of Giacomo Meyerbeer in the 1983 film Wagner.

== See also ==
- List of operas by Giacomo Meyerbeer
