= Michael Beer (poet) =

German Jewish poet, author and playwright

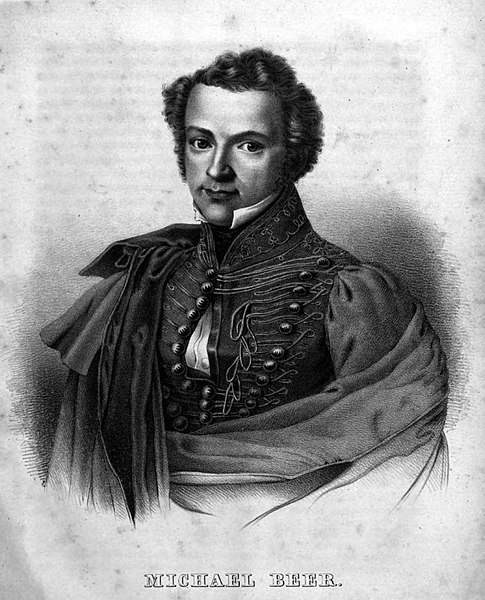
Michael Beer, by Carl Christian Vogel von Vogelstein (c.1833)

Michael Beer (19 August 1800, Berlin – 22 March 1833, Munich) was a German Jewish poet, author and playwright.

== Early life ==
Beer was born to a wealthy Jewish family, the son of salonnière Amalie Beer. His elder brother was the composer Giacomo Meyerbeer; another brother was the astronomer Wilhelm Beer.

In the period 1817–1823 he frequently travelled with family members in Italy, where his brother Meyerbeer was studying.

In 1819 Beer was a founding member of the Society for Jewish Culture and Jewish Studies, which attempted to provide an intellectual framework for considering the Jews as a people in their own right, and to validate their secular cultural traditions as being on an equal footing with those of the German people. Beer's co-founders included Eduard Gans, Moses Moser, Heinrich Heine and Leopold Zunz.

== Works ==
The first of Beer's works to be performed was Klytemnestra (Clytemnestra), (1819), influenced by the classicism of Goethe. His second stage-work Die Bräute von Aragonien (The Brides of Aragon), was also suggested by Goethe's poetry.

Far superior to these early works was the one-act play Der Paria (The Pariah), premiered in Berlin in 1823, and admired by Goethe, which was soon played on stages across Germany. In the play, the pariah Gadhi and his wife Maja choose to die so as to enable their son to live freely. The work can be construed as a cry of pain about the pariah status of Judaism in early nineteenth-century Germany. This is a topic which constantly recurs in Beer's correspondence with Meyerbeer. Beer's 1827 drama Struensee (based on the life of the German-Danish reformer Johann Friedrich Struensee) was initially banned from production in Prussia, and was premiered in 1828 in Munich, where Beer had briefly settled and where he became a friend of Schelling. Not until 1846 (thirteen years after the author's death) did the relaxation of censorship enable a performance in Berlin; for this King Frederick William IV commissioned Meyerbeer to provide an overture and incidental music.

Beer's poetic output includes a series of 'Elegies' written in Italy, a protest at the injustice of criminal sentencing (Im Gerichtssaal), and a satirical poem on the paradoxes of extreme religiosity (Der fromme Rabbi).

== Later life ==
Beer's personality is known mainly through his correspondence with his family and with the playwright Karl Leberecht Immermann. Beer spent many of his last years in Paris where he was acquainted with Heinrich Heine, Ferdinand Hiller and Felix Mendelssohn, who was an occasional chess-partner.

Beer's early death was attributed to neurasthenia. He is buried with his parents and siblings in the Jewish cemetery in Schönhauser Allee, Berlin.

== Michael Beer Foundation ==
Beer was, in the tradition of his family, generous of his wealth and supported scholars and artists, including the orientalist Salomon Munk. He bequeathed a large fortune, which was turned into a foundation administered by the Berlin Academy of Arts. The annual income of the Michael Beer Foundation was awarded to two young artists, who had to be Jewish; this financed a one-year study period in Italy, of which they had to spend at least eight months in Rome.
