= Amalie Beer =

German salon-holder

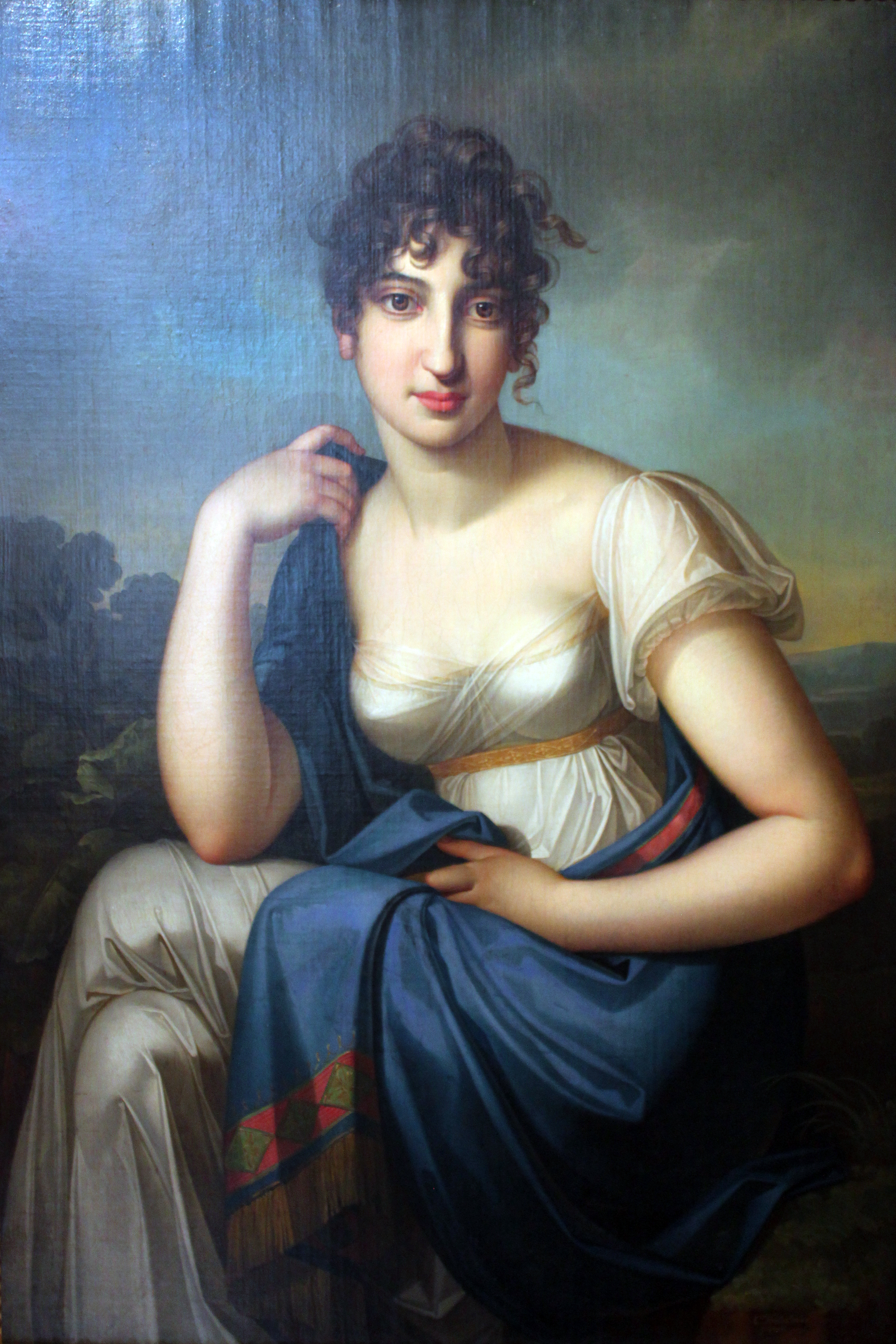
- Born: Amalie Malka Wulff; 10 February 1767; Berlin, Prussia
- Died: 27 June 1854 (aged 87); Berlin, Prussia
- Occupation: Salonnière
- Spouse: Jacob Herz Beer (m. 1788; died 1825)
- Children: Giacomo Meyerbeer; Wilhelm Beer; Michael Beer

Amalie Malka Beer (Hebrew: מלכה בער; 10 February 1767 – 27 June 1854) was a German Jewish philanthropist, communal worker, and salonnière.

== Biography ==
Amalie Malka Wolff was born in Berlin to Prussian court factor Liepmann Meyer Wulff and his wife Esther, née Bamberger (1740–1822). In 1788 she married the Jewish sugar manufacturer Jacob Herz Beer.

Beer was an active member of the Women's Aid Society for Wounded Soldiers, which was conducted under the patronage of Prince Wilhelm of Prussia. In consideration of her valuable services, she received from the king the Order of Queen Louise, being the first Jewish woman to be so distinguished. Beer achieved fame with her literary salon at Tiergartenstraße, which was honoured occasionally by the king's presence.

Amalie Beer was the mother of poet Michael Beer, composer Giacomo Meyerbeer, astronomer Wilhelm Beer, and one other son, Heinrich.
