= Heinz Becker (musicologist) =

German composer and musicologist (1922–2006)

Heinz Becker (26 June 1922 – 20 September 2006) was a German composer and musicologist.

== Career ==
Born in Berlin, Becker began his studies at the Hochschule für Musik in Berlin-Charlottenburg in 1945, majoring in conducting, music composition, piano and clarinet, graduating in 1949. He was also a private student of the composer and music theorist Hermann Grabner. Further studies included musicology, art history and philosophy at the Humboldt University of Berlin. (1948–1951). In 1951 he received his doctorate on the subject On the problems and technique of musical final composition. He then worked as a lecturer at the Volkshochschule in West Berlin and from 1952 to 1955 he directed the private music teacher seminar at the John Petersen Conservatory in Berlin-Zehlendorf. In 1956 he took over a position as a research assistant at the Institute for Musicology at the Gottfried Wilhelm Leibniz Universität Hannover. There he habilitated in 1961 with his thesis Studien zur Entwicklungsgeschichte der antiken und mittelalterlichen Rohrblattinstrumente ("Studies on the developmental history of ancient and medieval reed instruments"). In 1966 he was appointed as the first full professor to the chair of musicology at the Ruhr-Universität Bochum.

Becker specialized in the study of timbre (wind instruments) and opera, especially the French Grand opéra. Becker was married to the musicologist Gudrun Becker née Weidmann, with whom he edited his edition of Meyerbeer documents.

== Honours ==
- Festschrift Heinz Becker zum 60. Geburtstag am 26. Juni 1982, edited by Jürgen Schläder and Reinhold Quandt
- Musiktheater im Fokus. Gedenkschrift für Heinz Becker, edited by Sieghart Döhring and Stefanie Rauch. [On behalf of the Meyerbeer-Institute] Studio-Verlag, Sinzig. 2014

== Publications ==
- Der Fall Heyne-Meyerbeer: Neue Dokumente revidieren ein Geschichtsurteil
