= Andrea Chudak =

German soprano

Andrea Chudak is a German soprano singer.

Andrea Chudak was born in Bad Saarow, Brandenburg, Germany. During 1993-1998 she studies at the Hochschule für Musik Hanns Eisler Berlin, a music university, which she graduated in opera and concert singing. She continued studies at the Hochschule für Musik Karlsruhe and also took master classes with various music teachers.

Since 2001, she has been performing as a soloist in various German and Austrian opera houses and gave concerts abroad.

She devoted much of her work rediscovering the music of Giacomo Meyerbeer. From 2020 to 2021, she was a founding member and board member of the Giacomo Meyerbeer Society. She has been releasing albums with rediscovered music of Meyerbeer.

She also published two books of anecdotes about her concert business, Keine Sorge, wir machen das zum ersten Mal! [Don't worry, this is our first time doing this!] and Lassen Sie mich durch, ich muss hier singen! [Let me through, I need to sing here!].

== Discography ==
- 2010: JACOBS TRAUM- NEUE JÜDISCHE LIEDER. Kompositionen von M. Doehlemann, ANTES EDITION BM-CD 31.9267
- 2014: GIACOMO MEYERBEER - LIEDER, ANTES EDITION BM-CD 31.9294
  2019: Antes BM 1439008
- 2017: HÜTE DICH, BLEIB WACH UND MUNTER!. Durch die Nacht mit Robert Schumann, ANTES EDITION, BM319301
- 2019: MEYERBEER. SACRED WORKS, NAXOS 8.573907
- 2019: MEYERBEER. ROMANZEN, LIEDER, BALLADEN ANTES EDITION BM149008 (2CD)
- 2020: HUMPERDINCK. MUSIC FOR THE STAGE NAXOS 8.574177
- 2020: 68 Ave Maria aus sieben Epochen [68 Ave Maria from Seven Ages], a set of 5 CDs, ANTES BM179001
  A selection of Chudak's collection of over 300 versionns of Ave Maria. The article has links to several other reviews of the set.
- 2021: MEYERBEER:vocal ANTES EDITION BM149010 (2CD)
- 2021: MAX DOEHLEMANN, BO WIGET: RUACH YEOTONE YT21.001 (2CD)
- 2022: KLAUS WÜSTHOFF DIE REGENTRUDE - IM KINDERLAND, Yeotone YT22.002
- 2022:The Cracovian Album, Chansons and Canzoni by Luigi Cherubini, 2 CDs, Thorofon CTH26732
- 2023: (2021 digital release) 'JÜRGEN GOLLE - CHAMBER MUSIC. SOLANG DIE MENSCHEN MENSCHEN SIND
- 2023: MEYERBEER, G.: Jephtas Gelübde [Opera] (S. Freier, Chudak, Ziazan, Elsäßer, Kalaidjian, Sofia Philharmonic Chorus and Orchestra, Salvi), 2 CDs
- 2023: TUGEND & LASTER. LIEDER NACH TEXTEN VON WILHELM BUSCH ANTES EDITION BM319326
