= Die beiden Kalifen =

1813 opera by Giacomo Meyerbeer

- Opera by Jacob Meyerbeer
- Librettist: Johann Gottfried Wöhlbruch
- Language: German
- Based on: Tale from the Arabian Nights
- Premiere: 6 January 1813; 212 years ago Stuttgart Court Theatre

Die beiden Kalifen (The Two Caliphs) is an 1813 opera in two acts by Giacomo Meyerbeer (or as he was then known, Jacob Meyerbeer), to a libretto by Johann Gottfried Wöhlbruch, based on a tale from the Arabian Nights.

The opera, Meyerbeer's second attempt at this genre, was originally titled Wirt und Gast, oder Aus Scherz Ernst (Landlord and Guest, or The Joke which Became Serious). Under this name it was premiered at the Stuttgart Court Theatre on 6 January 1813, conducted by Conradin Kreutzer. Meyerbeer noted in his diary that "I arrived one day before the performance, and was able to supervise two rehearsals, but could do nothing to help really, since in every respect it had been badly and hurriedly prepared. The production was judged as poor by all critical accounts, and the opera was received very tepidly." The local press however reported that the opera "earned a deserved success. The music has striking, genuinely original passages, and the text has been diligently prepared."

The opera was given a single performance as Die beiden Kalifen during the Congress of Vienna at the Theater am Kärntnertor in Vienna on 20 October 1814. At this performance the role of Irene was sung by the soprano Cathinka Buchwieser.

The failure of the opera was a major factor in Meyerbeer determining to leave for Vienna in November 1814 and to seek his career outside German-speaking Europe. In a review, the English journal The Harmonicon commented: "At this period no music but Italian had a chance of being listened to in the Austrian capital; it is not to be wondered at, therefore, that Meyerbeer's opera, written upon an opposite principle and very nearly in the same style with his Daughter of Jeptha, failed completely."

The opera received further performances in Prague (22 October 1815), and, under the name Alimelek, oder die beiden Kalifen, in Dresden on 22 February 1820. Both these performances were conducted by Meyerbeer's friend Carl Maria von Weber, who wrote of its "active imagination. [and] well-nigh voluptuous melody", and praised its instrumentation.

== Roles ==
Roles, voice types, and premiere cast
Role	Voice type	Premiere cast, 6 January 1813 Conductor: Conradin Kreutzer
Harun Al-Rashid, the Caliph	bass	Gossler
Irene, his niece	soprano	Meier
Alimelek (Irene's lover)	tenor	Krebs
Jailer	spoken role	
Chorus: Retinue of the caliph, guards, servants, slaves, beggars, townsfolk
