= Ein Feldlager in Schlesien =

Singspiel in three acts by Giacomo Meyerbeer

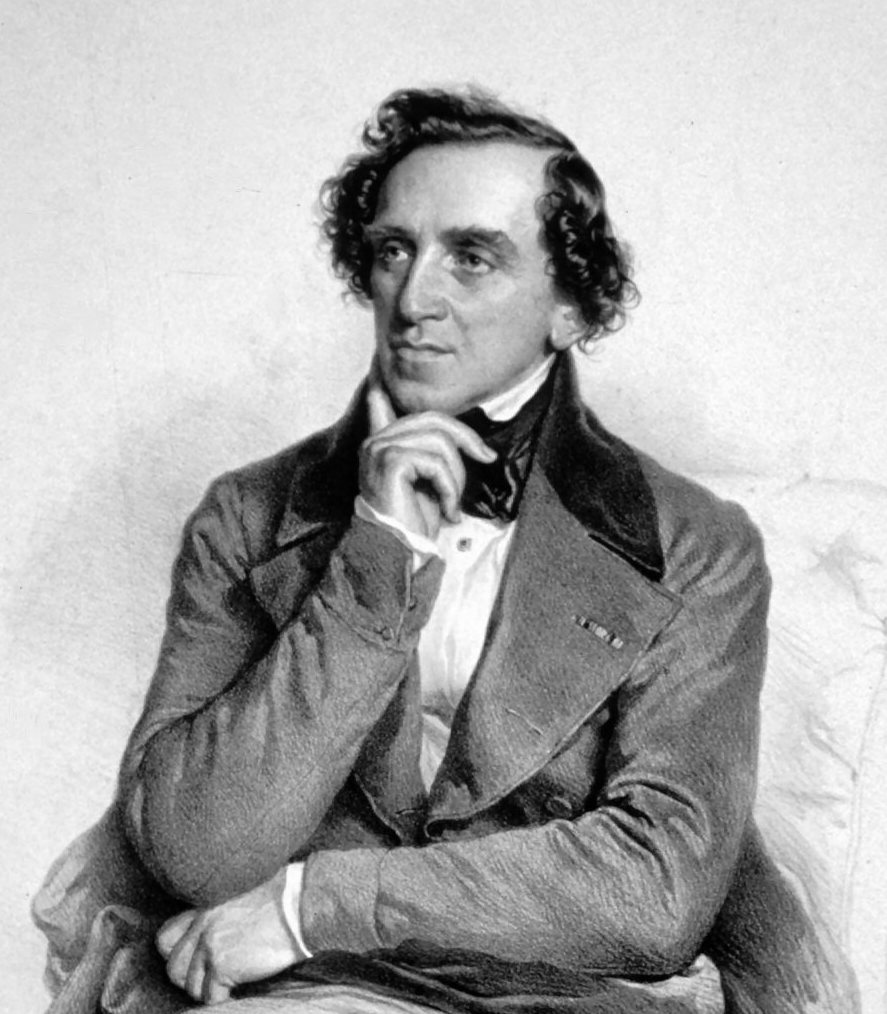
Giacomo Meyerbeer, portrayed in 1847

Ein Feldlager in Schlesien (A Camp in Silesia) is a Singspiel in three acts by Giacomo Meyerbeer with a German-language libretto by Ludwig Rellstab after Eugène Scribe's Le camp de Silésie. It was first performed at the Hofoper, Berlin, on 7 December 1844; a version with a revised libretto by Charlotte Birch-Pfeiffer, titled Vielka, opened in Vienna on 18 February 1847. Much material from the opera was later reused for Meyerbeer's opéra comique L'étoile du nord (1854).

== Background ==
Shortly after Meyerbeer arrived in Berlin in 1842 the opera house was destroyed by a fire. Meyerbeer was invited to compose a brand new work for the festive occasion of the reopening of the opera house. The reigning Prussian king at the time was Frederick William IV, of the house of Hohenzollern. What better theme for this opera than a work celebrating the king's famous ancestor, Frederick the Great? But there was one problem; members of the ruling Hohenzollern family could not be depicted on stage. Therefore, Frederick, whilst the nominal subject of the opera, remains unseen, but is, however, heard playing the flute in the background.

The selection of the librettist was a political issue. Meyerbeer wanted his trusted librettist Eugène Scribe, but the idea of a Frenchman writing the libretto for what was to be the Prussian national opera was unacceptable. The king wanted Ludwig Rellstab, a critic who was Meyerbeer's enemy, in the hopes that this would reconcile the two men. Meyerbeer, an astute diplomat, found a solution: Scribe was to provide the text, in secret, agreeing never to claim ownership, and Rellstab would translate it. Thus, the libretto was credited to the latter, and it was only recently that its true author was discovered.

== Casting ==
There was to be one other problem. The leading soprano role, that of Vielka, was composed for the big soprano "icon" of the period: Jenny Lind, who was already on the threshold of becoming world-famous. Meyerbeer had heard her in Paris, been very favorably impressed, and decided to engage her for Berlin. But she was in Stockholm during some of the rehearsals, and Leopoldine Tuczek, the company's regular coloratura, and Lind's understudy as Vielka, had been singing the part. The latter felt entitled to the role; Meyerbeer was overruled by the Intendant of the opera house, Karl Theodor von Küstner, and it was given to Tuczek. Lind accepted the situation gracefully, and, eight days later, on 15 December, made a triumphant Berlin debut. In the meantime, the lukewarm success of Feldlager was partly blamed on Tuczek, and the opera was withdrawn after five performances.

Lind's success as Norma in Berlin was such that she was signed to a new contract, and finally sang Vielka in early January. According to Schultz's biography of Lind, the success was so great that "when it was announced that Jenny would appear a second time in Feldlager, there was such a demand for tickets that the manager raised the price of admission. The opera was repeated over and over. There was never a night that the theater could not have been filled two or three times, and four clerks were kept busy answering letters and filling the request for tickets."

Following the opening at the Berlin Hofoper on 7 December 1844, Ein Feldlager in Schlesien was given in that city fairly regularly until 1891, but it apparently was never considered for export to other cities in its original version. This is probably due to its nature as a work glorifying the Prussian royal family, which made it highly suitable for Berlin audiences, especially on state occasions, but much less so for other European capitals, or even other German cities.

== Synopsis ==
Time: the Third Silesian War, a part of the larger Seven Years' War.
Place: Silesia and Potsdam

=== Act 1 ===
Chamber in Saldorf's house

King Frederick, fleeing from Hungarian soldiers led by Captain Tronk, meets the flute-player Conrad, who is in love with the gypsy Vielka. With the assistance of the retired officer Saldorf, his daughter Therese and Vielka, Conrad is passed off as the king and vice versa. The plan is successful and the king flees.

=== Act 2 ===
Prussian camp

Soldiers chant patriotic songs praising their respective branches' service for king and country. Suddenly, they hear a rumour accusing Saldorf of having betrayed the king. The loyal soldiers hence want to lynch the alleged traitor, but finally, Frederick appears, thus rescuing him.

=== Act 3 ===
Sanssouci Castle

Vielka and Konrad are received by the king and ought to tell him what they desire as a reward. When they learn that Leopold, Saldorf's son, is accused of being a traitor, they only ask for mercy which is granted. Finally, a military march resounds, and Vielka, who can now marry Conrad, prophesies the future greatness of Prussia.

== Roles ==
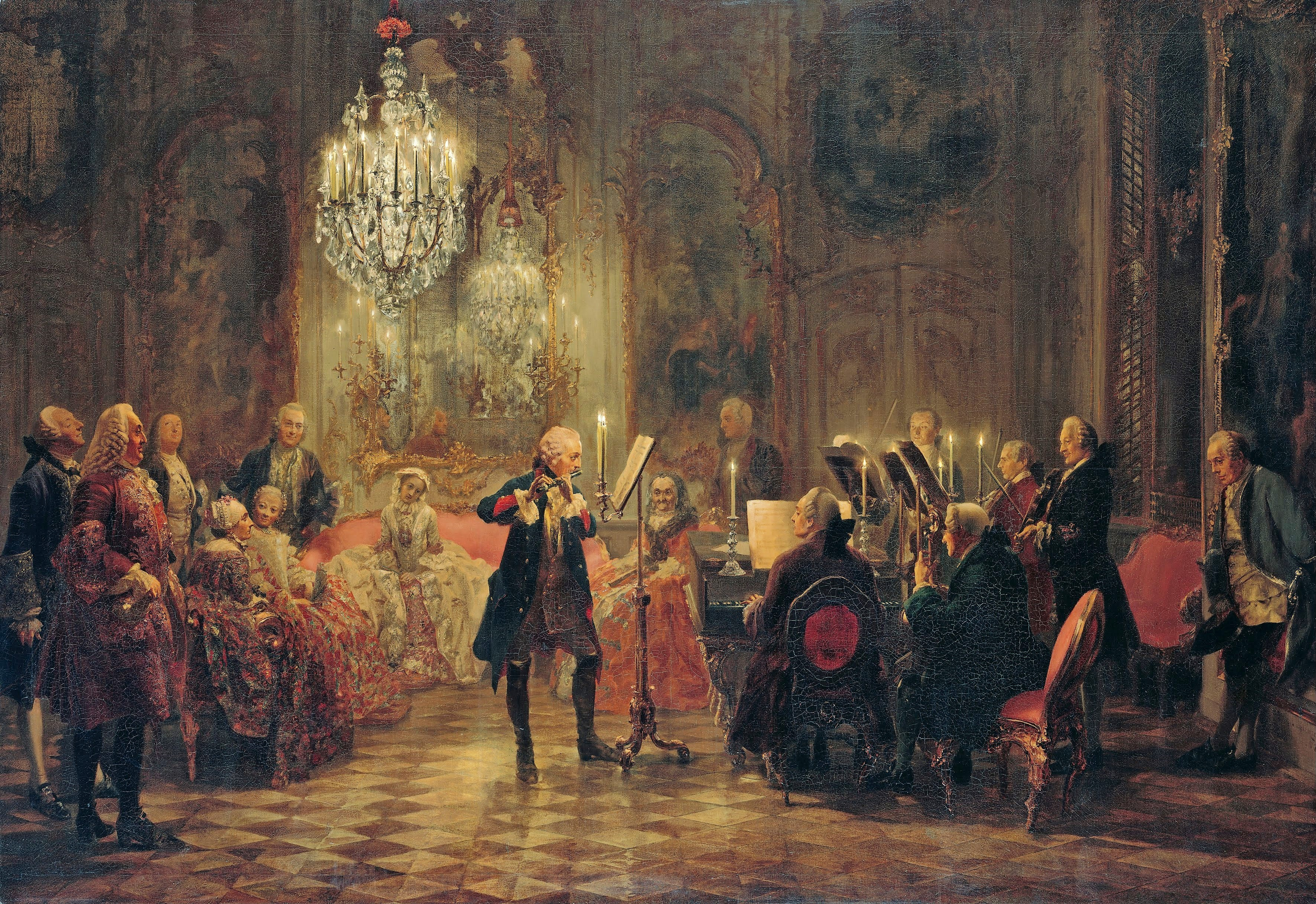
Flute Concert of Frederick the Great at Sanssouci (1850–2), Adolph Menzel

Roles, voice types, and premiere cast
Role	Voice type	Premiere cast 7 December 1844	Vielka premiere cast 18 February 1847
Vielka	soprano	Leopoldine Tuczek	Leopoldine Tuczek
Therese	soprano	Pauline Marx	Bergauer
Conrad	tenor	Eduard Mantius	Ditt
Saldorf	baritone	Louis Bötticher	Joseph Staudigl
Tronk	baritone	Heinrich Blume	n/a
Grenadier-Unteroffizier	bass	August Zschiesche	n/a
Artillerie-Unteroffizier	bass	Julius Krause	n/a
Ungarischer Reiter	tenor	Herr Heinrich	n/a
Zietenscher Husar	tenor	Julius Pfister	n/a
Schwarzer Husar	bass	August Mickler	n/a
Brauner Husar	unknown	Herr Bethge	n/a
Steffen	tenor	Carl Adam Bader	n/a
Ferenz		n/a	Radl
The Duke		n/a	Eduard Jerrmann
Count von Aubitz		n/a	Starke
Buddenbrogh		n/a	Biel
Xaver		n/a	Nolte
Hartmann		n/a	Verstl

== Vielka ==
The director of the Viennese Theater an der Wien, Franz Pokorny, requested permission for a production of Feldlager with Jenny Lind. This presented a problem due to the historical rivalry between the Hohenzollern and Habsburg dynasties. The libretto was therefore rewritten, at first by Rellstab, later by Birch-Pfeiffer. In the new version, Vielka, the King became a duke, and Saldorf a General. Whilst the first two acts are similar in plot to Feldlager, the last act is set in the castle of Count Aubitz and has a very different plot line. There is a complex series of disguises, mistaken identities, and attacks on the life of the duke, in one of which Vielka intercepts a bullet and is killed. In her final aria she has a vision of heaven. This version was premiered in Vienna on 18 February 1847. Lind took over the role of Vielka at the fourth performance.

== Reception ==
Feldlager came halfway between the first and the last two of Meyerbeer's four big five-act grand operas. It was his first attempt in some 30 years to compose a less serious work, or "Singspiel". In it, especially in the first and third acts, it is possible to see the influence of lighter composers, particularly Auber and Flotow. But much of the second act, especially the finale, is pure Meyerbeer of the grand operas. It has even been suggested that the triple march is reminiscent of the gathering of the cantons in William Tell. Meyerbeer had come up with a similar idea years before, when first the Egyptians and then the Crusaders march onto the scene in the finale of Act I of Il crociato in Egitto.

The big hits of the opera were Jenny Lind's air with two flutes in the third act, and the finale of the second act, which featured the famous triple march. The work was to be given in Berlin a total of 67 times, the last performance taking place in 1891. After Jenny Lind left, Tuczek reassumed the role, with many other important prima donnas, including Pauline Lucca, following in her footsteps.

== L'étoile du nord ==
The opera underwent a further transformation in 1854 as L'étoile du nord (q.v.)

== Recordings ==
- Vielka was revived in Berlin in the 1980s, a recording of which revival is available from the Meyerbeer Fan Club.

== See also ==
- Agnes von Hohenstaufen
- Günther von Schwarzburg
- Theodor Körner
