= Cathinka Buchwieser =

German operatic soprano and actress (1789–1828)

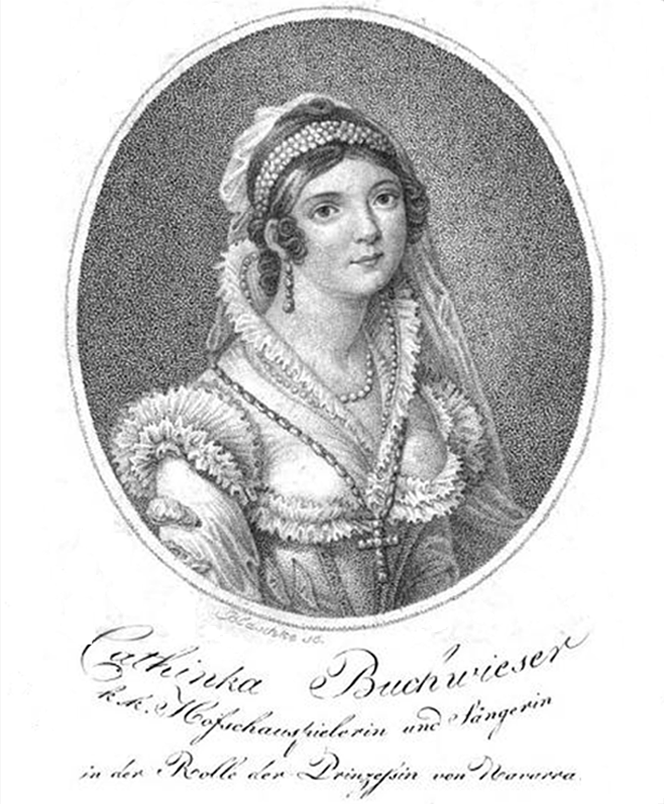
- Buchwieser as Princess of Navarra at the Theater an der Wien, 1813
- Born: 24 May 1789; Koblenz, Holy Roman Empire
- Died: 9 July 1828 (aged 39); Vienna, Austria
- Occupation: Operatic soprano
- Organizations: Theater an der Wien; Theater am Kärntnertor

Katharina Buchwieser ([kataˈʁiːna ˈbuːχ.viːsɐ]; 24 May 1789 – 9 July 1828) was a German operatic soprano and actress. She was known as Cathinka, and her married surname was Lacsny von Folkusfálva. (Note: Versions "Lascny" and "Laszny von Fokusfalva" appear in sources but are wrong.) She appeared at theatres of Vienna, the Theater an der Wien and the Theater am Kärntnertor, then the court theatre. Franz Schubert dedicated compositions to her.

== Career ==
Born in Koblenz, the daughter of the composer and Kapellmeister Balthasar Buchwieser, she made her debut in 1802 at the Frankfurt Opera as Myrrha in Peter von Winter's Das unterbrochene Opferfest. She certainly sang there in the 1803–04 season. In 1806, she moved to Vienna, where her father became Kapellmeister at the Theater an der Wien. She first appeared at the theatre on 6 December that year as Sesto in Mozart's La clemenza di Tito.

She performed regularly at the Theater am Kärntnertor from 1809. She appeared as the Princess of Navarra in Jean de Paris by François-Adrien Boieldieu in 1813 at the Theater an der Wien. In 1814, she appeared as Irene in Giacomo Meyerbeer's early opera Die beiden Kalifen. She performed as an actress, as it was customary in Vienna.

Her operatic roles included Mozart's Donna Elvira in Don Giovanni, the title roles of Ferdinando Paer's Achille, Camilla and Leonora, and the title role in Henri-Montan Berton's Aline, reine de Golconde. She retired from the stage in 1815, but still performed in concerts.

Hochwieser married Karl Joseph Graf von Hrzan in 1808. The marriage was annulled by the emperor in 1820 after Hrzan was accused of criminal actions. In 1821, she married Miklós Lacsny, an administrator of the estates of Count Ferdinánd Pálffy.

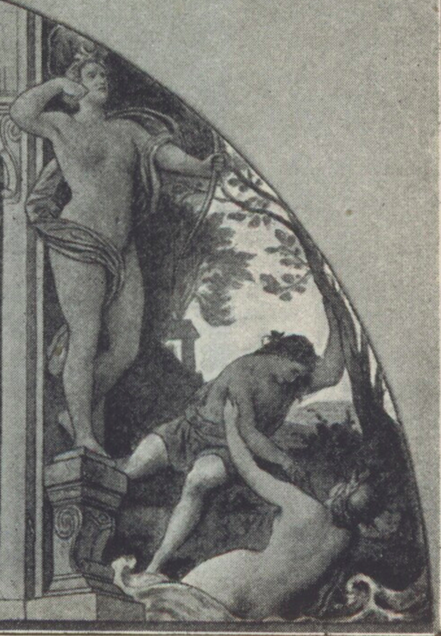
M. v. Schwind: Schubert in the Wiener Hofoper (1869), left: Buchwieser as Diana

Franz Schubert probably knew her in connection to her former colleague Johann Michael Vogl, and met Johann Nepomuk Hummel and Ferdinand Hiller at soirées in her home, among others. He dedicated compositions to her, his Lieder after poems by Johann Mayrhofer, Op. 36, which is the second version of two songs, "Der zürnenden Diana" (To Diana in her wrath), D. 707, and "Nachtstück", D. 672, and his Divertissement à l'hongroise in G minor for piano duet, D. 818 (Op. 54).

Buchwieser died in Vienna.
