= Johann Carl Friedrich Rellstab =

Johann Carl Friedrich Rellstab (27 February 1759 – 19 August 1813) was a German composer, writer, music publisher, and critic who was born and died in Berlin. Rellstab was a very influential figure in Berlin's musical life.

== Career ==
He performed in student concerts 1768 to 1775 at the Joachimsthal Gymnasium in Berlin. He studied with Johann Friedrich Agricola from 1773 to 1776, and composition with Carl Friedrich Christian Fasch. He planned to continue his education with Carl Philipp Emanuel Bach in Hamburg, when in 1779 he had to take over the printing business of his father. Given his interest in music, Rellstab changed the focus of the business towards music and added a music lending library (in 1783) and a music publishing branch to the firm (ca. 1785). Later on, Rellstab also made instruments and sold other music supplies. After losing his property in the War of the Fourth Coalition in 1806, he began teaching music lessons to children.

Around the turn of the century Rellstab began to write criticism for the Vossische Zeitung, the oldest daily in Berlin. Rellstab's compositions include a Te Deum, a mass, numerous cantatas, lieder, and an unperformed singspiel, Die Apotheke, among other works.

His son Ludwig Rellstab was also a music critic and a poet. Rellstab's eldest daughter, Caroline Rellstab (1793–1813), was a singer noted for her extraordinary range extending to F_{6}. She sang at Breslau from 1811, and was particularly well known for her role as the Queen of the Night in Mozart's Die Zauberflöte.

== Published works ==
- Versuch über die Vereinigung der musikalischen und oratorischen Declamation, hauptsächlich für Musiker und Componisten mit erläuternden Beyspielen (1786)
- Über die Bemerkungen eines Reisenden, die Berlinischen Kirchenmusiken, Concerte, Oper und königliche Kümmermusik betreffend (polemical pamphlet, 1789)
- Anleitung für Clavierspieler, den Gebrauch der Bach'schen Fingersetzung, die Manieren und den Vortrag betreffend (1790)
