= Jakob Rosenhain =

German Jewish pianist and composer

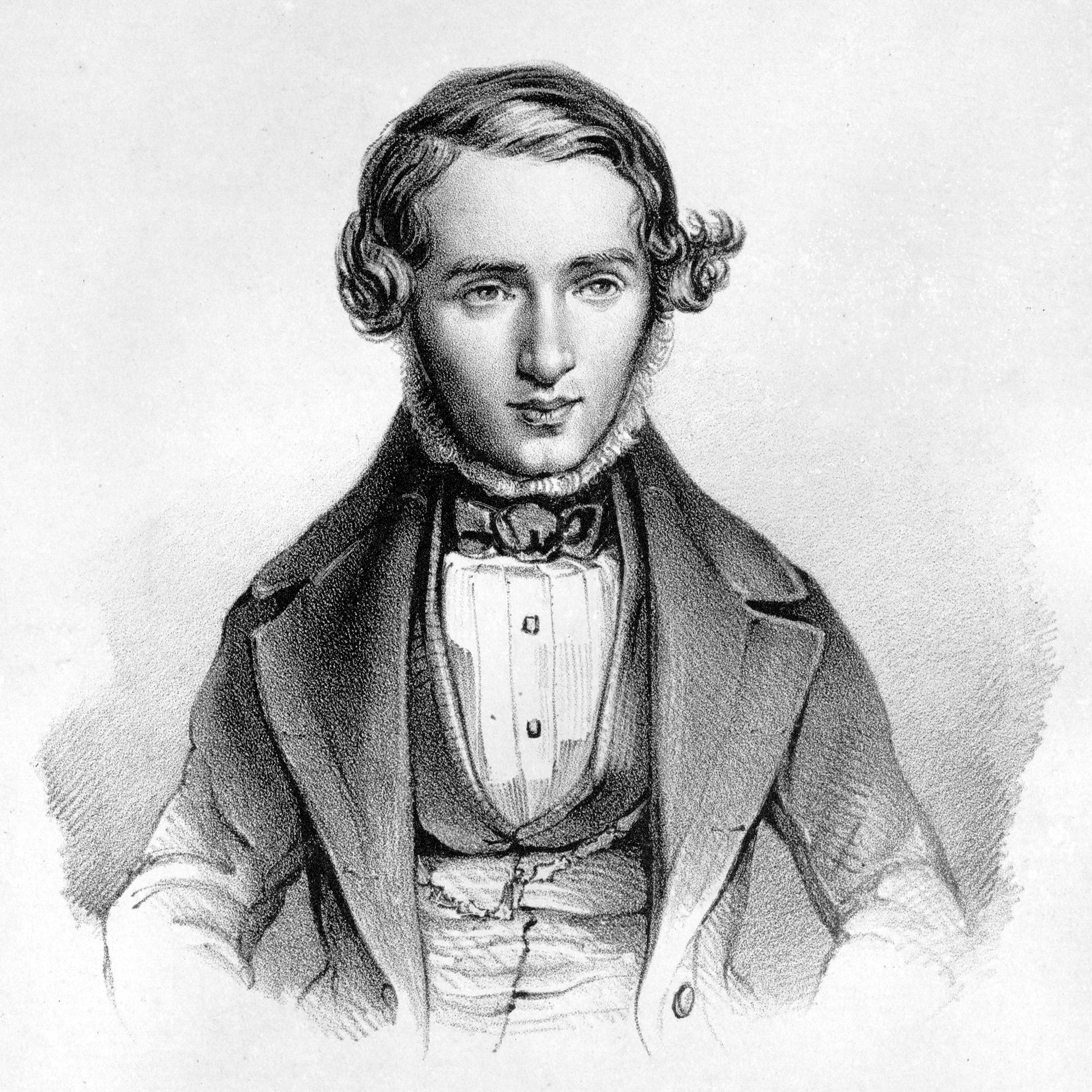
Jakob Rosenhain

Jakob Rosenhain (Jacob, Jacques) (2 December 1813 – 21 March 1894) was a German Jewish pianist and composer.

Rosenhain was born in Mannheim; he made his debut at the age of 11. During their 1837 season, he was a soloist with the London Philharmonic Orchestra (on 17 April), which in 1854 (also in April) programmed one of his symphonies.

He was a friend of Felix Mendelssohn at least from 1839. He worked with Johann Baptist Cramer on a published school of piano-playing. From 1849 he made his home in Paris.

Rosenhain died in Baden-Baden.

== Selected compositions ==
Four operas

- Der Besuch in Irrenhause (1834)
- Liswenna (1835)
- Le Démon de la Nuit (1851); Liswenna rewritten
- Volage et Jaloux (1863)

Orchestra

- Symphony No. 1 in G minor, Op. 42
- Symphony No. 2 in F minor, Op. 43 (performed, possibly premiered, 1846 by Mendelssohn in Leipzig)
- Symphony No. 3 "Im Frühling", Op. 61

Concertante

- Piano Concerto in D minor, Op. 73

Chamber works

- Piano Quartet in E♭, Op. 1
- Sonata in E for piano with violoncello or violin, Op. 38
- Piano Sonata in F minor, Op. 44?; à M. Fétis
- Sonate Symphonique in F minor (Piano Sonata No.2?), Op. 70 (pub. Breitkopf, 1887)
- Piano Sonata (No.3?) in D, Op. 74 (published by Breitkopf, 1886)
- 3 String Quartets, Opp. 55, 57, 65 (pub. 1864)
- Sonata in D minor for cello (or violin, or viola) and piano, Op. 98. (manuscript for viola, noted in RISM Online and dates from 1893)
- Four Piano Trios

Songs

- at least two dozen

== Bibliography ==
- Singer, Isidore; Sohn, Joseph. "Article on Rosenhain from The Jewish Encyclopedia".
- Brown, James Duff (1886). Biographical Dictionary of Musicians: With a Bibliography of English Writings on Music at Google Books. A. Gardner. page 522.
- Hubbard, W. L. (William Lines) (1910/2005 reprint) The American History and Encyclopedia of Music: Musical Biographies Part Two at Google Books. Kessinger Publishing. ISBN 1-4179-0713-4.
- May, Florence (1905). The Life of Johannes Brahms at Google Books. E. Arnold. Pages 28–9.
- Pratt, Waldo Selden; Mendel, Arthur (1907). The History of Music: A Handbook and Guide for Students at Google Books. G. Schirmer. Page 538.
- "Lied and Art Song Texts Page: Rosenhain". The Lied, Art Song, and Choral Texts Archive.
- "Scan of Rosenhain F minor (1st) Piano Sonata at Bavarian Digital Library". Heugel (Paris). 1857.
