= Jean Balthasar Tricklir =

French cellist and composer

Jean Balthasar Tricklir (1750 – 29 November 1813) was a French cellist and composer of German descent.

== Biography ==
Tricklir was born in Dijon in 1750. Initially, he intended to join the priesthood but decided to become a musician and went to study in Mannheim in 1765. He made his musical debut at the Concert Spirituel in Paris in 1776 and became a chamber composer to the Elector of Mainz in 1782. However, he left it a year later and became a court musician in Dresden. In 1783, he formed a quartet alongside Franz Benda and Ernst Schick.

Tricklir died in Dresden on 29 November 1813.

== Works ==
Tricklir wrote several cello concertos, sonatas, and solo and duet works for cello; however, his works are little known today. He authored two theoretical treatises: Le Microcosme Musical and Discours Analytique. His theoretical studies included an analysis of temperature's role in affecting musical instruments' sound.

== Works ==
- Adagio and Rondo for Cello and Piano
- Six grand solos for the violoncello Op. 3
- 13 cello concertos (survived)
