= Jephtas Gelübde =

Opera composed by Giacomo Meyerbeer

- Opera by Jakob Meyerbeer
- Librettist: Aloys Schreiber
- Language: German
- Based on: story of Jephthah in the Book of Judges
- Premiere: 23 December 1812; Munich Court Theatre

Jephtas Gelübde (The vow of Jephthah) was the first opera composed by Giacomo Meyerbeer. The libretto, which is elaborated from the story of Jephthah from the Book of Judges, was by Aloys Schreiber. The first performance was at the Hoftheater (Cuvilliés Theatre) in Munich on 23 December 1812. Two manuscripts of the score survive, one in the British Library, London, the other in Brussels.

== Composition history ==
Meyerbeer wrote Jephtas Gelübde while he was studying with Abt Vogler (and while he was still known as Jakob, rather than the first name Giacomo which he was to adopt after his studies in Italy). He completed the score in Würzburg in April 1812, writing the overture last of all. During his revision of the score in June and July, Meyerbeer had already begun writing his second opera, Wirth und Gast. The score reflects Vogler's interest in colourful orchestration.

Rehearsals began for the opera in November 1812, with which Meyerbeer was not satisfied. "Deliberate and accidental hindrances of every sort intruded, and even on 20 December I was not certain whether the opera would be given in the 23rd. Anxiety, annoyance and vexation of every sort bothered me in these six weeks." In the event there were three performances, and the opera was fairly successful with many numbers applauded, although the composer thought that Lanius, as Jephta, "played very mediocrely".

== Roles ==
Roles, voice types, and premiere cast
Role	Voice type	Premiere cast, 1812 Conductor: Giacomo Meyerbeer
Jephta		Christian Lanius
Sulima, (Jephta's daughter)	soprano	Helena Harlas
Asmaweth (Sulima's lover)	tenor	Georg Weixelbaum
Tirza (Sulima's servant)		Josephine Flerx
Abdon		Georg Mittermayr
High Priest		Herr Schwadke
Choruses of Levites, of prisoners and of warriors

== Recordings ==
- Jephtas Gelübde - Sönke Tams Freier, Andrea Chudak, Ziazan, Marcus Elsäßer, Laurence Kalaidjian, Sofia Philharmonic Orchestra, Dario Salvi. 2 CDs Marco Polo 2023
