= Jürgen Schläder =

German theatre director and musicologist (born 1948)

Jürgen Schläder (born 1948 in Hagen) is a German theatre director and musicologist, who was from May 1987 to March 2014 Professor of Theatre Studies with a focus on stage music at LMU Munich.

He studied German literature and musicology at the Ruhr-University Bochum and achieved his doctorate in musicology in 1978 with the dissertation Undine in stage music. In 1986, he habilitated on the subject of Das Opernduett. A 19th century scene type and its prehistory. His current research focuses are: Aesthetic foundations and analysis of contemporary directorial theatre, experimental forms of modern music for theatre and the history of the Bavarian State Opera in the 20th century.
