= Ludwig Rellstab =

German poet and music critic

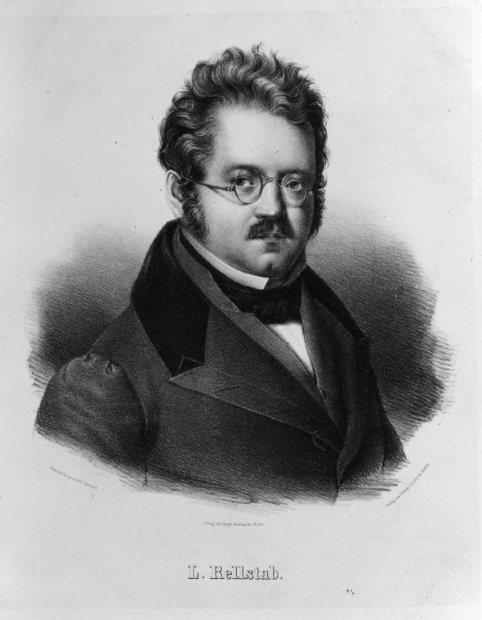
Ludwig Rellstab

Heinrich Friedrich Ludwig Rellstab (13 April 1799 – 27 November 1860) was a German poet and music critic. He was born and died in Berlin. He was the son of the music publisher and composer Johann Carl Friedrich Rellstab. An able pianist, he published articles in various periodicals, including the influential liberal Vossische Zeitung, and launched the music journal Iris im Gebiete der Tonkunst, which was published in Berlin from 1830 to 1841. His outspoken criticism of the influence in Berlin of Gaspare Spontini landed him in jail in 1837.

Rellstab was, according to Max Graf, "the first great music critic". His considerable influence gave him some power over what music could be used for German nationalistic purposes in the mid-nineteenth century. Because he had "an effective monopoly on music criticism" in Frankfurt and due to the popularity of his writings, Rellstab's approval would have been important for any musician's career in areas in which German nationalism was present.

The first seven songs of Franz Schubert's Schwanengesang have words by Rellstab, who had left them in 1825 with Beethoven, whose assistant Anton Schindler passed them on to Schubert. His work was also set to music by Franz Liszt.

He is also known to have given Beethoven's Piano Sonata No. 14 in C-sharp minor, Op. 27/2, its famous nickname Moonlight Sonata.

Concerning Chopin's nocturnes, in contrast with those of John Field:

“Where [John] Field smiles, Chopin makes a grinning grimace; where Field sighs, Chopin groans; where Field shrugs his shoulders, Chopin arches his back like a cat, where Field puts some seasoning into the food, Chopin empties a handful of cayenne pepper… In short, if one holds Field’s charming romances before a distorting, concave mirror, so that every delicate impression becomes a coarse one, one gets Chopin’s work. We implore Mr Chopin to return to nature.” - Ludwig Rellstab after 1832 when Chopin's first Nocturne was published.
