= Bassi (surname) =

Bassi is an Italian surname and also a Punjabi (Punjabi: ਬੱਸੀ) surname of separate origins. Notable people with the surname include:

== Arts and entertainment ==
- Adolfo Bassi (1775–1855), Italian composer and operatic tenor
- Aldo Bassi (1962–2020), Italian jazz trumpeter
- Amedeo Bassi (1872 - 1949), Italian tenor
- Antonio Bassi (died 1782), Italian painter
- Anubhav Singh Bassi (born 1991), Indian comedian
- Bartolomeo Bassi (c. 1600–c. 1640), Italian painter
- Calisto Bassi (19th century–c. 1860), Italian opera librettist
- Carolina Bassi (1781–1862), Italian contralto
- Ettore Bassi (born 1970), Italian actor and television presenter
- Francesco Bassi (1642–1732), Italian painter
- Giovanna Bassi (1762–1834), Italian ballerina
- Luigi Bassi (1766–1825), Italian operatic baritone
- Luigi Bassi (clarinetist) (1833–1871), Italian composer and clarinetist
- Maurizio Bassi (born 1960), Italian music composer and musician
- Parsifal Bassi (1892–1960), Italian actor, screenwriter and film director
- Priyanka Bassi, Indian television actress
- Sergio Bassi (1949–2020), Italian folk singer-songwriter
- Sofía Bassi (1913–1998), Mexican painter and writer
- Tullio Bassi (1937), Italian violin maker
- Valentina Bassi (born 1972), Argentine film and television actor

== Sports ==
- Amine Bassi (born 1997), Moroccan footballer
- Chanreet Bassi (born 2001), Canadian professional ice hockey forward
- Daniel Bassi (born 2004), Norwegian football player
- Davide Bassi (born 1985), Italian football player
- Dick Bassi (1915–1973), American football player
- Ekaterina Bassi (born 1977), Greek taekwondo practitioner
- Fred Bassi, Canadian ice hockey player
- Giancarlo Bassi (1926–2019), Italian ice hockey player
- Giorgio Bassi (born 1934), Italian race car driver
- Harry Bassi (born 1969), Scottish rugby union player
- Lucia Bassi (born 1936), Italian tennis player
- Noelle Bassi (born 1983), U.S. swimmer
- Nuvraj Bassi (born 1983), Canadian football player

== Others ==
- Agostino Bassi (1773–1856), Italian entomologist
- Carlo Bassi (1807–1856), Italian entomologist
- Charles Bassi or Charles (Carlo) Francesco Bassi (1772–1840), Finnish architect of Italian descent
- Ghana Bassi, a leader of the Ghana empire during the time of conquest by the Almoravids
- Giovanni Calderón Bassi (born 1971), Chilean politician and lawyer
- Laura Bassi (1711–1778), Italian scientist
- Livio Bassi (1918–1941), Italian aviator
- Martino Bassi (1542–1591), Italian architect
- Matteo Bassi (1495–1552), founder of the Order of Friars Minor Capuchin
- Melvin Bassi (1926–2007), American lawyer and banker
- Shaul Bassi, Italian professor of English and postcolonial literature
- Suzanne Bassi (born 1945), U.S. politician
- Tina Lagostena Bassi (1926–2008), Italian lawyer
- Ugo Bassi (1800–1849), Italian patriot
