= List of compositions by Ferdinando Carulli =

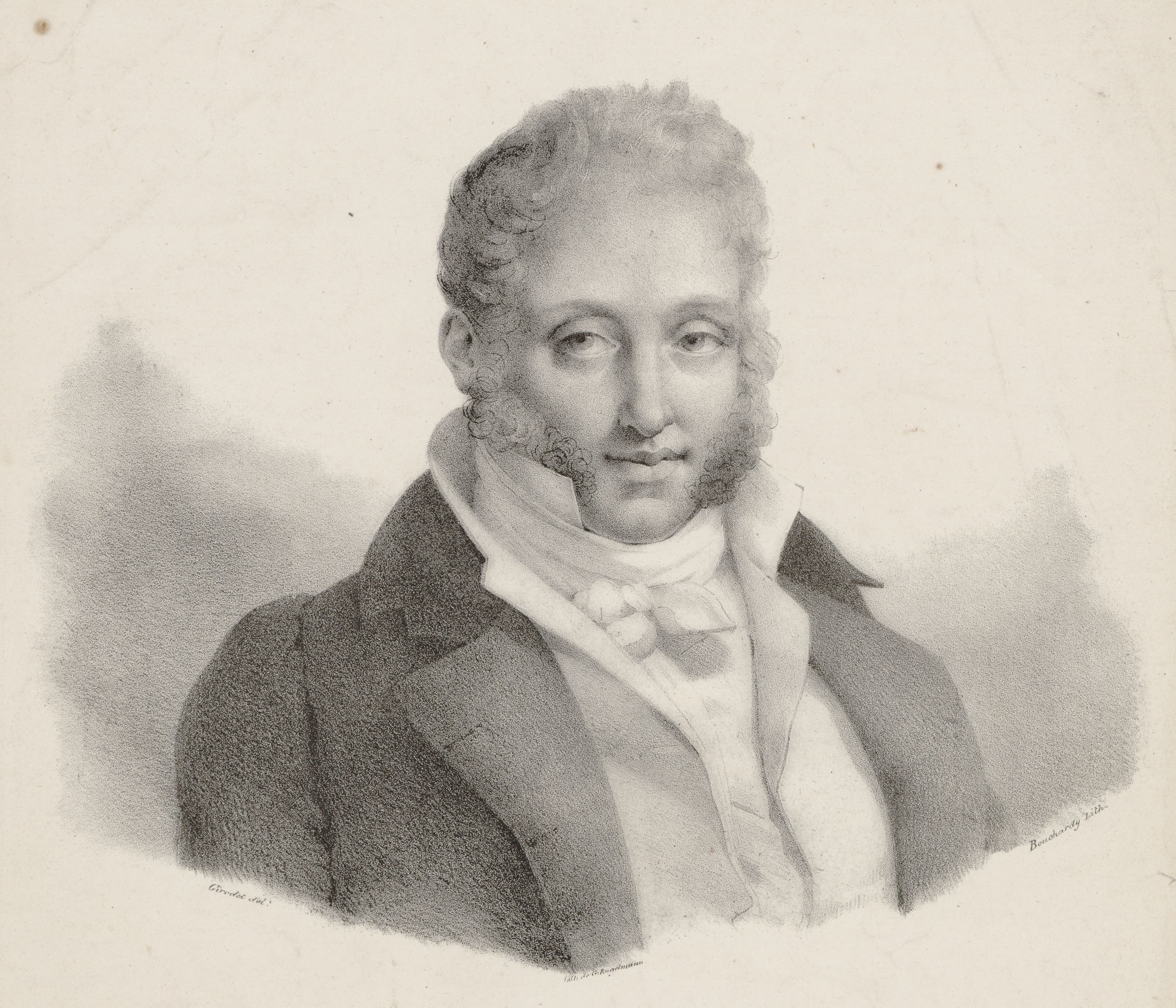
Ferdinando Carulli

This is a list of compositions by Ferdinando Carulli.

== Works With Opus Numbers ==
- Trois Petits Duos Op. 1 (Duo de guitares), c. 1809
- Sonate Op. 2, c. 1809
- Trois Airs et Trois Romances Op. 3 (Voix et guitare), c. 1811
- Trois Duos Op. 3 (Violon et guitare), c. 1811
- Trois Airs Op. 4 (Voix et guitare), c. 1808
- Trois Duos Op. 4 (Violon et guitare)
- Recueil de Sonatines Op. 5, c. 1809
- Sonate Op. 5, c. 1810
- Trois Duos Op. 5 (Violon et guitare), c. 1810
- Grand Nocturne Op. 6 (Duo de guitares), c. 1810
- Trois Ouvertures Op. 6, c. 1809
- Sérénade Op. 7 (Duo de guitares), c. 1809
- Trois Sonatine Op. 7, c. 1809
- Concerto Op. 8 in A major (Guitare et Orchestre), c. 1809
- Fantaisie Op. 9, c. 1807
- Grande Sonate Op. 9 (Duo de guitares), c. 1810
- Sonate Op. 9, c. 1809
- Trio Op. 9 (Flûte, violon et guitare), c. 1807
- Grand Solo Op. 10, c. 1809
- Duo Op. 11 (Guitare et Piano), c. 1809
- Trio Op. 12 (Flûte, violon et guitare), c. 1809
- Trois Petits Duos Op. 13 (Violon et guitare), c. 1809
- Duo Op. 14 (Violon et guitare), c. 1810
- Deux Airs variés Op. 15, c. 1811
- Recueil Op. 15 (Duo de guitares), c. 1810
- Grande Sonate Op. 16, c. 1816
- Sonate Sentimentale Op. 16, c. 1816
- Duo Op. 17 (Violon et guitare), c. 1810
- Trois Divertissements Op. 18, c. 1810
- Duo Op. 19 (Violon et guitare), c. 1809
- Solo Op. 20, c. 1810
- Trois Sonate Op. 21, c. 1811
- Trois Duos Op. 22 (Violon et guitare), c. 1811
- Trois Sonatine Op. 23, c. 1811
- Trois Petits Nocturnes Op. 24 (Flûte, alto et guitare), c. 1811
- Grande Sonate Op. 25 (Duo de guitares), c. 1811
- Duo Op. 26 (Violon et guitare), c. 1811
- Duo Concertante Op. 27 (Violon et guitare), c. 1811
- Méthode Op. 27, c. 1809
- Trois Ouvertures Op. 28, c. 1810
- Pot Pourri Op. 29, c. 1811
- Grand Duo Op. 30 (Violon et guitare), c. 1827
- Six Duos Op. 31 (Violon et guitare), c. 1811
- Trois Valse Op. 32 (Guitare et Piano), c. 1810
- Sonate Sentimentale Op. 33, c. 1807
- Six Duos Op. 34 (Duo de guitares), c. 1811
- Recueil Op. 35, c. 1811
- Recueil Op. 36, c. 1811
- Duo Op. 37 (Guitare et Piano), c. 1811
- Deux Thèmes Variés et Rondo Op. 38 (Duo de guitares), c. 1809
- Recueil Op. 38, c. 1812
- Recueil Op. 39, c. 1811
- Recueil Op. 40, c. 1811
- Trois Sonates Op. 41, c. 1811
- Sonate Sentimentale Op. 42, c. 1811
- Trois Duos Op. 43 (Violon et guitare), c. 1811
- Divertissement Op. 44, c. 1811
- Grand Duo Op. 45 (Guitare et Piano), c. 1811
- Trois Grand Duo Op. 46 (Duo de guitares), c. 1811
- Trois Sonate Op. 47, c. 1811
- Trois Duos Op. 48 (Duo de guitares), c. 1810
- Six Contredanses et Trois Valses Op. 49 (Duo de guitares), c. 1809
- Recueil Op. 50, c. 1810
- Six Duos Op. 51 (Flûte ou violon et guitare), c. 1813
- Vingt-quatre Airs Op. 52 (Duo de guitares), c. 1811
- Trois Rondo Op. 53, c. 1813
- Deux Pot Pourris Op. 54, c. 1813
- Deux Thèmes Variés Op. 55, c. 1820
- Trois Sonates Op. 56, c. 1813
- Trois Duos Op. 57 (Duo de guitares), c. 1813
- Six Contredanses Op. 58 (Duo de guitares), c. 1813
- Trois Sonatine Op. 59, c. 1813
- Trois Solo Variés Op. 60, c. 1812
- Méthode Op. 61, c. 1810
- Trois Duos Op. 62 (Duo de guitares), c. 1813
- Grand Duo Op. 63 (Guitare et Piano), c. 1813
- Huit Pièces Op. 64 (Violon et guitare), c. 1813
- Grand Duo Concertant Op. 65 (Guitare et Piano), c. 1810
- Six Airs Op. 66 (Violon et guitare), c. 1811
- Six Duos Op. 67 (Duo de guitares), c. 1813
- Deux Airs variés Op. 68 (Violon et guitare), c. 1813
- Vingt-quatre Airs Op. 69, c. 1813
- Grand Duo Op. 70 (Guitare et Piano), c. 1810
- Méthode Op. 71, c. 1810
- Divertissement Op. 72 (Duo de guitares), c. 1810
- Airs Nationaux Op. 73, c. 1814
- Pot Pourri Op. 74, c. 1813
- Variations Op. 75, c. 1813
- Trois Solo Op. 76, c. 1814
- Deux Pot Pourri Op. 78, c. 1813
- Deux Pot Pourri Op. 79, c. 1814
- Trois Airs Op. 80, c. 1814
- Trois Petites Sonates Op. 81, pub. 1815
- Petites fantasies sur les airs Charmante Gabrielle et Vive Henri IV Op. 82, pub. 1815
- Grande Sonate Op. 83, pub. 1815
- Trois Menuets et Trois Valses Op. 84, c. 1814
- Pièce Historique Op. 85, c. 1814
- Grand Duo Op. 86 (Guitare et Piano), c. 1813
- Six Pièces Op. 87, c. 1815
- Trois Duos Nocturnes Op. 88 (Violon et guitare), c. 1815
- Trois Duos Op. 89 (Duo de guitares), c. 1809
- Trois Duos Nocturnes Op. 90 (Duo de guitares), c. 1809
- Trois Thèmes Variés Op. 91, c. 1812
- Trois Petits Duos Op. 92 (Guitare et Piano), c. 1812
- Recueil Op. 93, c. 1814
- Caprice sur des airs de la Tyrolienne et de la Hongroise Op. 94, pub. 1815 (Naderman, Paris)
- Trois Fantaisie Op. 95, c. 1811
- Trois Sérénades Op. 96 (Duo de guitares), c. 1815
- Recueil Op. 97 (Duo de guitares), c. 1815
- Fantaisie Op. 98, c. 1814
- Recueil Op. 99, c. 1816
- Valse Favorite Op. 100 (Duo de guitares), c. 1820.
- Six Valses Op. 101, c. 1820
- Fantaisie Op. 102 (Violon et guitare), c. 1816
- Trois Trios Concertants Op. 103 (Violon, alto et guitare), c. 1814
- Trois Duos Op. 104 (Duo de guitares), c. 1813
- Six Valses Op. 105, c. 1814
- Ouverture Op. 106 (Duo de guitares), c. 1815
- Solo Op. 107, c. 1816
- Six Valses Viennoises Op. 108 (Violon et guitare), c. 1816
- Six Duos Op. 109 (Flûte et Guitare), c. 1817
- Deux Airs Russes Op. 110 (Duo de guitares), c. 1817
- Pot Pourri Op. 111, c. 1820
- Pot Pourri Op. 112 (Duo de guitares), c. 1817
- Solo Op. 113, c. 1817
- Recueil Op. 114, c. 1817
- Nocturne Op. 115 (Violon et guitare), c. 1817
- Fantaisie Op. 116, c. 1817
- Fantaisie Op. 117 (Duo de guitares), c. 1817
- Nocturne Concertante Op. 118 (Duo de guitares), c. 1817
- Trois Nocturnes Op. 119 (Flûte, violon et guitare), c. 1817
- Recueil Op. 120 (Duo de guitares), c. 1817
- Vingt-quatre Pièces Op. 121, c. 1817
- Vingt-quatre Valse Op. 122, c. 1817
- Fantaisie Op. 123 (Flûte, violon et guitare), c. 1817
- Recueil Op. 124, c. 1818
- Six Airs variés Op. 125, c. 1818
- Danse Nationale Op. 126 (Duo de guitares), c. 1818
- Nocturne Op. 127 (Guitare et Piano), c. 1819
- Six Duos Op. 128 (Duo de guitares), c. 1819
- Six Duos Op. 129 (Violon et guitare), c. 1819
- Vingt-quatre Bagatelles Op.130 c. 1819
- Divertissement Op. 131 (Trois guitares), c. 1825
- Deux Nocturnes Op. 131 (Guitare et Piano), c. 1819
- Divertissement Op. 132 (Duo de guitares), c. 1819
- Duo Op. 133 (Duo de guitares), c. 1819
- Duo Op. 134 (Guitare et Piano), c. 1820
- Duo Op. 135 (Guitare et Piano), c. 1820
- Variations Op. 136 (Duo de guitares), c. 1820
- Deux Duos Op. 137 (Alto et guitare), c. 1820
- Divertissement Op. 138, c. 1820
- Valse Op. 139 (Duo de guitares), c. 1820
- Concerto Op. 140 (Guitare et Orchestre), c. 1820
- Polonaise Op. 141, c. 1824
- Variations Op. 142, c. 1820
- Trois Nocturnes Concertants Op. 143 (Duo de guitares), c. 1820
- Air Varié Op. 144, c. 1820
- Recueil Op. 145, c. 1821
- Trois Duos Op. 146 (Duo de guitares), c. 1821
- Recueil Op. 147, c. 1821
- Trois Duos Op. 147 (Flûte et guitare), c. 1821
- Nocturne Op. 148 (Duo de guitares), c. 1821
- Trois Divertissements Op. 149 (Flûte, violon et guitare), c. 1821
- Duo Op. 150 (Guitare et Piano), c. 1821
- Duo Op. 151 (Guitare et Piano), c. 1821
- Symphonie Op. 152 (Duo de guitares), c. 1822
- Air Op. 153 (Violon et guitare), c. 1822
- Deux Duos Op. 154 (Violon et guitare), c. 1822
- Andante et Rondo Op. 155 (Duo de guitares), c. 1822
- Quintette Op. 156 (Violon et guitare), c. 1822
- Fantaisie Op. 157 (Duo de guitares), c. 1822
- Deux Duos Op. 158 (Flûte et guitare), c. 1822
- Trois Sonatines Op. 159, c. 1822
- Adagio et Variations Op. 160 (Guitare et Piano), c. 1822
- Grande Marche Op. 161 (Guitare et Piano), c. 1822
- Variations et Rondo Op. 162, c. 1822
- Adagio et Finale Op. 163 (Violon et guitare), c. 1822
- Larghetto et Variations Op. 164 (Duo de guitares), c. 1822
- Symphonie Op. 165 (Violon et guitare), c. 1822
- Trois Airs variés Op. 166 (Duo de guitares), c. 1823
- Andante et Rondo Op. 167 (Duo de guitares), c. 1822
- Grande Marche Op. 168 (Guitare et Piano), c. 1822
- Variations Op. 169 (Guitare et Piano), c. 1825
- Trois Petits Duos Op. 170 (Duo de guitares), c. 1827
- Trois Nocturnes Brillants Op. 171 (Flûte, violon et guitare), c. 1827
- Trois Rondo Op. 172, c. 1823
- Recueil Op. 173, c. 1823
- Recueil Op. 174, c. 1823
- Recueil Op. 175, c. 1822
- Recueil Op. 176 (Violon et guitare), c. 1822
- Recueil Op. 177 (Violon et guitare), c. 1822
- Recueil Op. 178 (Violon et guitare), c. 1822
- Recueil Op. 179 (Duo de guitares), c. 1822
- Recueil Op. 180 (Duo de guitares), c. 1822
- Recueil Op. 181 (Duo de guitares), c. 1822
- Recueil Op. 182 (Guitare et Piano), c. 1822
- Recueil Op. 183 (Guitare et Piano), c. 1822
- Recueil Op. 184 (Guitare et Piano), c. 1822
- Nocturne Op. 185, c. 1822
- Caprice Op. 186, c. 1823
- Trois Duos Op. 187 (Duo de guitares), c. 1821
- Divertissement Op. 188, c. 1822
- Trois Duos Nocturnes Op. 189 (Guitare et Piano), c. 1823
- Nocturne Op. 190 (Flûte et guitare), c. 1823
- Trois Duos Op. 191 (Flûte et guitare), c. 1823
- Supplément à la Méthode Op. 192, c. 1822
- Six Contredanse et Quadrilles Op.193 (Duo de guitares), c. 1822
- Trois Airs variés Op. 194, c. 1823
- Solfège Op. 195, c. 1822 et c. 1826
- Six Duos Op. 196 (Guitare et Harpe), c. 1823
- Trois Sonatines Op. 196 (Guitare et Piano), c. 1823
- Fantaisie Op. 197 (Flûte ou violon et guitare), c. 1823
- Trois Duos Op. 198 (Violon et guitare), c. 1823
- Trois Duos Op. 199 (Duo de guitares), c. 1823
- Fantaisie Op. 200 (Duo de guitares), c. 1823
- Fantaisie Op. 201, c. 1823
- Trois Duos Op. 202 (Violon et guitare), c. 1823
- Trois Duos Op. 203 (Duo de guitares), c. 1823
- Douze Petites Pièces Op. 204 c. 1823
- Divertissement Op. 205 (Violon et guitare), c. 1823
- Grand Duo Op. 206 (Violon et guitare), c. 1823
- Deux Solo Op. 207 (Violon, alto, violoncelle et guitare), c. 1823
- Deux Nocturnes Op. 208 (Violon, alto, violoncelle et guitare), c. 1823
- Trois Divertissements Op. 209 c. 1823
- Chanson Op. 210, c. 1823
- Dix-huit Pièces Op. 211 c. 1824
- Six Duos Op. 212 (Duo de guitares), c. 1824
- Divertissement Op. 213 (Duo de guitares), c. 1824
- Divertissement Op. 214 (Violon et guitare), c. 1824
- Recueil Op. 215, c. 1824
- Variations Op. 216, c. 1824
- Fantaisie Op. 217 (Duo de guitares), c. 1824
- Nocturne Op. 218 (Duo de guitares), c. 1828
- Grandes Variations Op. 219 (Duo de guitares), c. 1824
- Variations Op. 219 (Guitare et Orchestre). 1824
- Recueil Op. 221, c. 1825
- Air Varié Op. 222, c. 1824
- Trois Divertissements Op. 223 c. 1826
- Douze Pièces Op. 224 c. 1825
- Six Duos Op. 226 (Duo de guitares), c. 1825
- Trois Nocturne Op. 227 (Duo de guitares), c. 1825
- Fantaisie Op. 228, c. 1824
- Solo Op. 229, c. 1824
- Quatre Pièces et Huit Préludes Op. 1, c. 1824
- Trois Duos Op. 231 (Duo de guitares), c. 1828
- Recueil Op. 232, c. 1825
- Deux Duos Op. 233 (Guitare et Piano), c. 1824
- Deux Thèmes Variés et Un Rondo Op. 234 c. 1824
- Recueil Op. 235, c. 1825
- Recueil Op. 236 (Guitare et Piano), c. 1825
- Six Rondo Op. 237 (Duo de guitares), c. 1825
- Chanson Op. 238, c. 1825
- Recueil Op. 239 (Violon et guitare), c. 1825
- Trio Op. 240 (Flûte, violon et guitare), c. 1825
- Méthode Op. 241, c. 1825
- Trois Rondo Op. 242, c. 1824
- Trois Duos Op. 243 (Duo de guitares), c. 1824
- Deux Duos Op. 244 (Violon et guitare), c. 1824
- Deux Fantaisie Op. 245 (Violon et guitare), c. 1824
- Grand Recueil Op. 246, c. 1825
- Fantaisie Op. 247, c. 1825
- Recueil Op. 248 (Duo de guitares), c. 1825
- Recueil Op. 249 (Violon et guitare), c. 1825
- Trois Solo Op. 250 (Violon et guitare), c. 1825
- Fantaisie Op. 251 (Trois guitares), c. 1825
- Quatuor Op. 252 (Flûte, violon, violoncelle et guitare), c. 1825
- Quatuor Op. 253 (Violon, alto, violoncelle et guitare), c. 1825
- Nocturne Op. 254 (Violon, alto et guitare), c. 1825
- Grand Trio Op. 255 (Trois guitares), c. 1826
- Trois Duos Op. 256 (Violon et guitare), c. 1827
- Deux Divertissements Op. 257 (Violon et guitare), c. 1827
- Trois Divertissements Op. 259 (Violon et guitare), c. 1827
- Trois Solo Op. 260, c. 1827
- Trois Divertissements Op. 261 (Violon et guitare), c. 1826
- Trois Solo Op. 262, c. 1827
- Trois Solo Op. 263, c. 1827
- Pièces Progressives Op. 264, c. 1828
- Petits Préludes Op. 265, c. 1826
- Fantaisie Op. 267, c. 1826
- Trois Trios Concertants Op. 268 (Deux violons et guitare), c. 1827
- Nocturne Op. 269 (Deux violons et guitare), c. 1825
- De tout un peu. Recueil de 34 morceaux divers en six livres, Op.270, c. 1825
- Grande Recueil Op. 272, c. 1825
- Trois Divertissements Op. 273 (Duo de guitares), c. 1825
- Trentedeux Bagatelles Op. 273, c. 1825
- Deux Fantaisie Op. 274, c. 1826
- Grande Recueil Op. 276, c. 1825
- Recueil Op. 277, c. 1825
- Trois Polonaises Op. 278, c. 1825
- Deux Mélodies Op. 281 (Violon et guitare), c. 1825
- Recueil Op. 282, c. 1826
- Trois Divertissements Op. 283 (Flûte ou violon et guitare), c. 1825
- Six Rondo Op. 284, c. 1826
- Trois Duos Brillants Op. 285 (Duo de guitares), c. 1817
- Recueil Op. 286, c. 1830
- Fantaisie Op. 287, c. 1826
- Fantaisie Op. 288 (Flûte, violon et guitare), c. 1826
- Fantaisie Op. 289 (Violon et guitare), c. 1826
- Rondo Op. 290 (Duo de guitares), c. 1827
- Six Pièces Op. 291, c. 1826
- Trois Airs variés Op. 291, c. 1826
- Deux Fantaisie Op. 292, c. 1827
- Méthode pour le Décacorde Op. 293, c. 1826
- Deux Grandes Duos Op. 294 (Duo de guitares), c. 1826
- Quatre Pièces Op. 295 (Violon et guitare), c. 1827
- Rondo, Divertissement et Variations Op. 297 c. 1830
- Fantaisie Op. 298, c. 1827
- Recueil Op. 300, c. 1827
- Variations Op. 301 (Duo de guitares), c. 1829
- Rondo Op. 302 (Duo de guitares), c. 1828
- Fantaisie Op. 303, c. 1828
- Divertissement Op. 304 (Violon et guitare), c. 1828
- Divertissement Op. 305 (Violon et guitare), c. 1834
- Divertissement Op. 306, c. 1827
- Trois Duos Concertants Op. 309 (Violon et guitare), c. 1828
- Vingt-quatre Pièces Op. 310 c. 1828
- Deux Quadrilles Op. 311 (Guitare et Piano), c. 1834
- Duo Op. 312 (Violon et guitare), c. 1828
- Fantaisie Op. 313 (Violon et guitare), c. 1828
- Six Divertissements Op. 317, c. 1829
- Recueil Op. 318 (Duo de guitares), c. 1829
- Recueil Op. 319 (Duo de guitares), c. 1830
- Six Andantes Op. 320, c. 1830
- Dix-huit Pièces Op. 321, c. 1834
- Fantaisie Op. 322, c. 1830
- Fantaisie Op. 323, c. 1830
- Recueil Op. 324, c. 1830
- Fantaisie Op. 325, c. 1830
- Fantaisie Op. 326 (Duo de guitares), c. 1830
- Fantaisie Op. 327, c. 1830
- Grand Duo Concertant Op. 328 (Violon et guitare), c. 1831
- La Marseillaise, Variations Op. 330, 1830
- Les Trois jours Op. 331, c. 1830
- La Parisienne, Marche nationale variée Op. 332, 1830
- Recueil Op. 333, c. 1831
- Trois Rondo Op. 334, c. 1831
- Trois Marches Op. 335, c. 1831
- Trois Divertissements Op. 336 (Violon et guitare), c. 1831
- Fantaisie Op. 337 (Flûte et guitare), c. 1831
- Trois Caprices Op. 338 (Flûte ou violon et guitare), c. 1832
- Scherzo Op. 339, c. 1831
- Fantaisie Op. 340, c. 1831
- Deux Fantaisie Op. 341 (Violon et guitare), c. 1832
- Trois Divertissements Op. 342 (Flûte ou violon et guitare), c. 1832
- Trois Nocturnes Op. 343 (Flûte ou violon et guitare), c. 1832
- Recueil Op. 344, c. 1832
- Fantaisie Op. 345 (Violon et guitare), c. 1832
- Fantaisie Op. 346, c. 1832
- Recueil Op. 347, c. 1832
- Deux Rondo Op. 348, c. 1832
- Douze Galops Op. 349, c. 1833
- Six Galops Brillants Op. 350 c. 1834
- Trois Redobles Op. 353 c. 1834
- Fantaisie Op. 363, c. 1835
- Romance Op. 364, c. 1835
- Fantaisie Op. 366, c. 1836

== Works Without Opus Numbers ==
- Concerto in G major (for Flute, guitar and orchestra), Italian period.
- Symphonie (Flûte, violon et guitare), c. 1825
- Symphonie (Flûte, violon et guitare), c. 1825
- Variety Of Twelve Overtures By Rossini for guitar and piano
  - Cinderella, Or Goodness Triumphant
  - Bianca And Falliero, Or The Council Of Three
  - The Italian Girl In Algiers
  - Tancredi
  - Othello, Or The Moor Of Venice
  - The Merry Deception
  - The Barber Of Seville, Or The Useless Precaution
  - The Thieving Magpie
  - Semiramis
  - Torvald And Dorliska
  - Edward And Christina
  - Armida
- Rondo In D major for guitar and piano
- Fantasy Written With Different Motives From "Fiorella" By Auber In A Major for guitar and piano
- Duo (Voix et guitare)
- Ouverture (Duo de guitares), c. 1820
- Ouverture (Violon et guitare), c. 1812
- Ouverture (Flûte, violon et guitare), c. 1825
- Quatre Nocturnes (Deux voix et guitare)
- Recueil (Flûte et guitare), c. 1815
- Recueil, c. 1824
- Six Nocturnes (Deux voix et guitare)
- Sonate, c. 1807
- Trio (Flûte, violon et guitare), c. 1825
