= Horse and Rider (wax sculpture) =

Sculpture

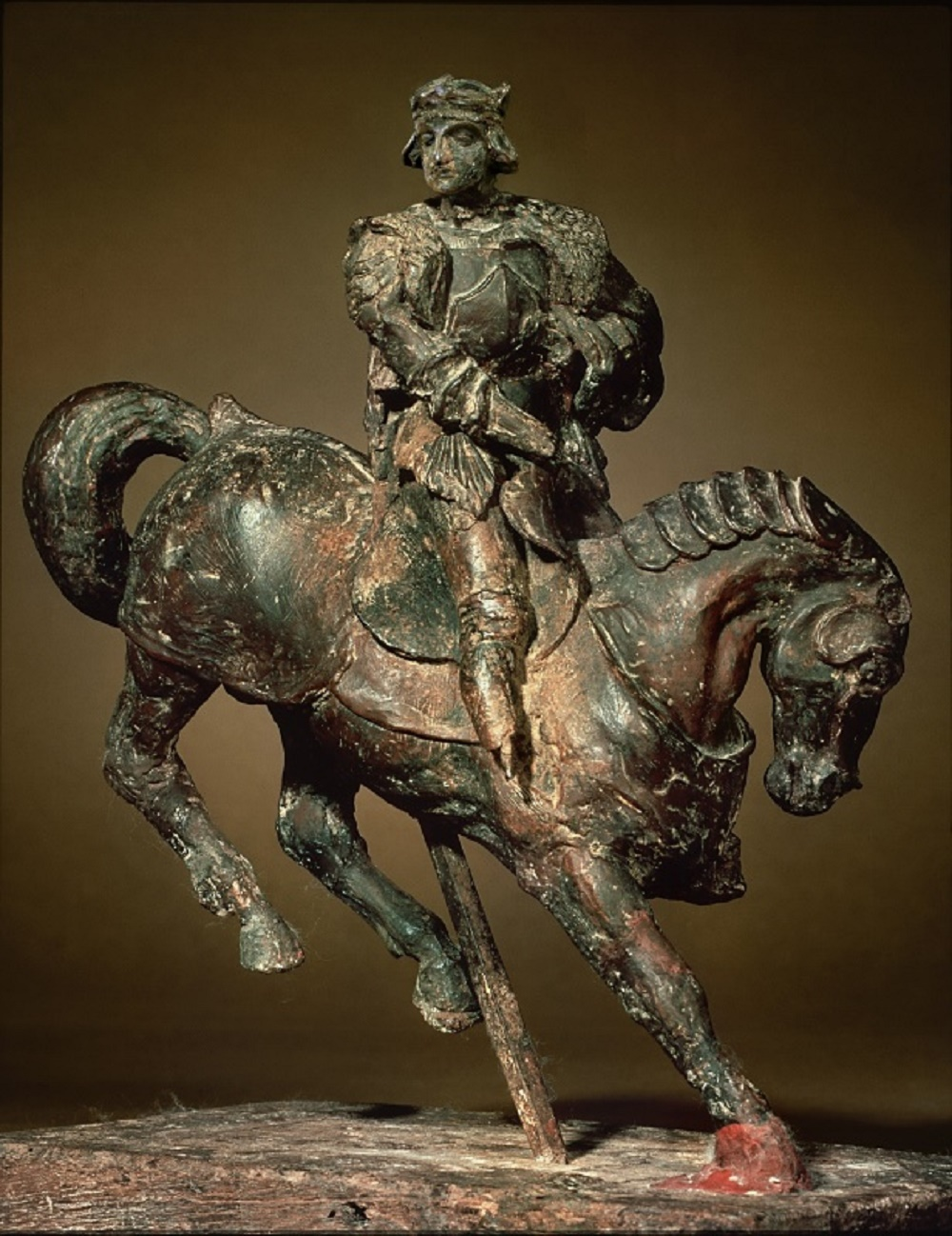
Beeswax maquette of a horse and rider sometimes attributed to Leonardo da Vinci

Horse and Rider is a beeswax sculpture created 1508–1511 depicting a rider on a horse. The history of the sculpture is unknown before the 20th century. The work has been attributed to Leonardo da Vinci by the Italian art historian Carlo Pedretti, though most other art historians disagree with the attribution.

In the 1980s a latex mould was made from the wax original, and many casts have been taken from this and sold. The wax sculpture and mold have passed through various private hands in recent decades, and are not on view to the public.

== History ==
The pre-20th century history of Horse and Rider has not been established, with the first public attribution of the wax sculpture to Leonardo being made in 1987. The statue was said to have been in the possession of the Melzi di Cusano family in Milan, inherited from Franseco Melzi, a friend and protégé of Leonardo. However, no records of the statue were found in an examination of the family's archives.

The first documented mention of the statue is ascribed to the Giorgio Sangiorgi (1886–1960) collection in Rome, which stated that the statue had been acquired from the Melzi family. While part of the Sangiorgi collection, the statue remained publicly unattributed. Following a sale by the Sangiori collection in the early 20th century, the wax statue came to be privately owned. Sources conflict on the details of ownership and the location of the statue; a number of sources state the statue was passed among unnamed art collectors in Europe, before being moved to Switzerland in either 1920 or 1938. Conversely, an Italian artist and collector, Antonio Bassi, was cited in an auction house publication as having inherited the sculpture from his father, who had claimed to have purchased the sculpture from the Sangiorgi collection in the late 19th century.

By 1979 the statue was in the possession of Antonio Bassi. In 1979, Bassi approached Italian art historian Carlo Pedretti with the wax sculpture and invited Pedretti to observe it. Pedretti examined the statue and took black and white photos of it, and in correspondence favorably compared the sculpture to drawings of horses done by Leonardo in the Royal Collection at Windsor Castle.

Bassi sold the wax statue to a consortium headed by James Cadenhead and David Nickerson, director of Mallett at Bourdon House in London, in 1982. It was presented to a group of American businessmen in 1985. Pedretti wrote personal correspondence attributing the statue to Leonardo that same year, but the attribution remained private. As it was continuing to degrade, they had a latex mold made to preserve its condition. Their intention was to market a limited edition of bronze casts, which did not happen until 25 years later.

In 1987 a catalogue raisonné of Leonardo's drawings stored in the Royal Collection at Windsor Castle, Pedretti included a number of descriptions and pictures of the wax statue, and formally attributed the fragmentary statue to Leonardo. His attribution of the statue to Leonardo was the first public attribution of the statue to the artist, making 1987 the first year the statue had either been seen or published in the public record. That same year, the latex mold of the original beeswax statue was acquired by an American businessman, Richard Lewis, who also purchased documentation relating to the attribution. The original beeswax statue was not acquired as part of this deal, and remained in London.

The beeswax sculpture was displayed around the world in the 1990s as part of a travelling exhibition named "Leonardo da Vinci: Scientist, Inventor, Artist" in Sweden in Stockholm, Malmö and Gothenburg in 1995, Vienna in 1996, and in Boston and Singapore in 1997. During the exhibition, several institutions were criticized by experts for displaying works of art - including Horse and Rider - as being by Leonardo, due to a lack of direct evidence.

Due to its fragility, the wax statue remains in a temperature-controlled private collection in London.

=== Leonardo da Vinci provenance ===
According to Pedretti's attribution, the history of the sculpture is directly tied to Leonardo da Vinci. In 1506 Charles II d'Amboise summoned Leonardo to return to Milan from Florence. D'Amboise commissioned Leonardo to design the gardens for his suburban villa. From 1503 until the death of his patron in 1511 Leonardo developed the concept of an equestrian portrait of his patron and friend, Charles d'Amboise. Leonardo is known to have used wax models to study the compositions of his paintings, as noted by Benvenuto Cellini in reference to the sculptures in Milan and Florence.

Upon Leonardo's death in 1519 his unfinished works, drawings and notebooks were inherited by Francesco Melzi, Leonardo's friend and protégé. The documents of the Melzi d'Eril family, who own Francesco's still existing Villa Melzi in Vaprio d'Adda, don't however have a record of the wax sculpture.

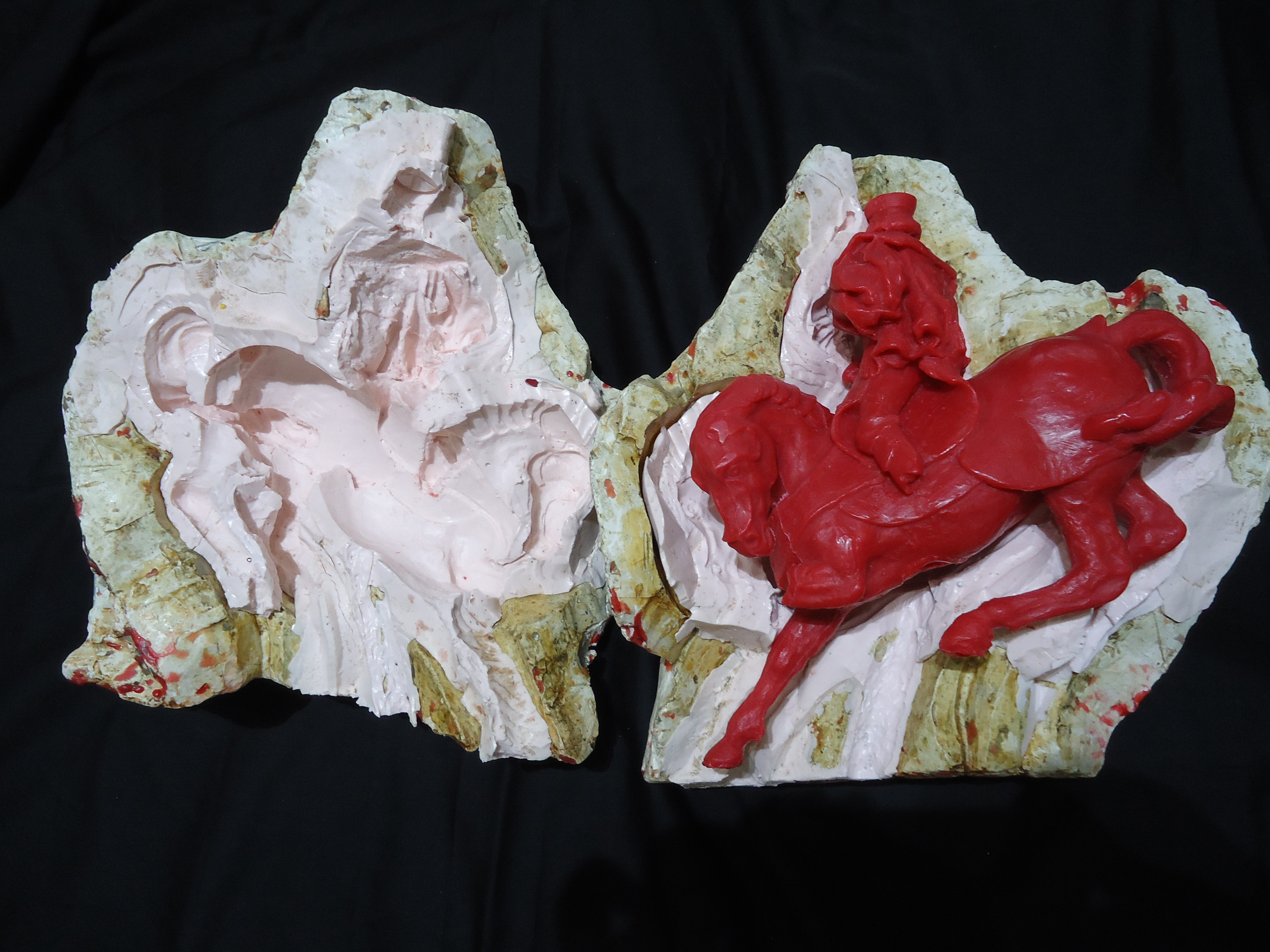
The 1985 mold made directly of the beeswax model showing the "pulled" red wax.

== Attribution and disputes ==
The sculpture was attributed to Leonardo da Vinci by art historian Carlo Pedretti in 1985, mainly due to a note Leonardo had written for himself in another work. On a c.1503-1504 worksheet from the Codex Windsor set of Leonardo's drawings are sketches of horses, believed to be part of a study for the painting of The Battle of Anghiari. In the middle of the sheet is a note to "make one of wax about finger long", and the bucking posture of one of the horses is similar to the sculpture. Leonardo may indeed have used wax models to prepare for Anghiari. Art historian Patricia Trutty-Coohill also noticed a resemblance between the rider and Charles II d'Amboise from Andrea Solari's painting from c.1507. Charles was one of Leonardo's patrons, and the subject matter would suit what's known of him. The beeswax statuette, including black and white photographs, was first published as a work by Leonardo in 1987 in "The drawings and miscellaneous papers of Leonardo da Vinci" in The collection of Her Majesty the Queen at Windsor Castle. The book was part of a series that Pedretti had taken over from Kenneth Clark, cataloging Leonardo's drawings stored in the Royal Collection in Windsor Castle.

Most art historians have made no comment on the work, and Pedretti's attribution has been criticized over the years. After examining the model, art historian Martin Kemp stated that "it has none of the characteristics of understanding horse anatomy and renaissance armor that you would expect from Leonardo". Art history professor Francesco Caglioti dates the sculpture to the late 19th century as a revivalistic work. When exhibited at the Boston Museum of Science in 1997, the museum agreed to change the credit on the label of the sculpture from "by Leonardo" to "attributed to Leonardo", but art historian Jack Wasserman still insisted that nothing has survived to support the attribution. Art historians Pietro Marani and Franco Cardini, and art critic Vittorio Sgarbi, likewise doubted the sculpture's provenance when the bronze cast was exhibited in Milan in 2016, commenting that there still isn't adequate hard evidence to support the attribution of the work to Leonardo, and that Pedretti and Solari are often too generous with their attributions. Following his studies of medieval cavalry, Cardini also criticized the historical accuracy of the sculpture.

== Description ==
The approximately 10 inches (25 cm) high, 9 inches (23 cm) long, and 3.5 inches (9 cm) wide beeswax sculpture is believed to be a maquette for a full size bronze sculpture. The model used to cast the sculpture sustained damage, resulting in the sculpture suffering the loss of the horse's front-left leg along with the rider's feet and hands.

According to professor Ernesto Solari, curator of a 2016 exhibition of the sculpture, it is innovative, far removed from the classical models the young Leonardo had been familiar with during his time with Andrea del Verrocchio; particularly when Verrocchio was working on the Equestrian statue of Bartolomeo Colleoni. Solari's interpretation of marks on the statuette includes a signature, a date and a fingerprint, which he assumes to be Leonardo's.

Historian Franco Cardini hypothesizes that "this is a funeral monument. There are several clues that lead to this interpretation; the horse is portrayed disarranging the rider to indicate that the animal is frightened. It is going down to the underworld, while the knight Charles II d'Amboise, on the other hand is portrayed in a serene mood and eyes closed, the hand on his heart; the Governor of Milan is parting from his loved ones. Finally, one can notice the thigh protector in the shape of a shell, a symbol of travel, in this case without return."

== Bronze sculpture ==
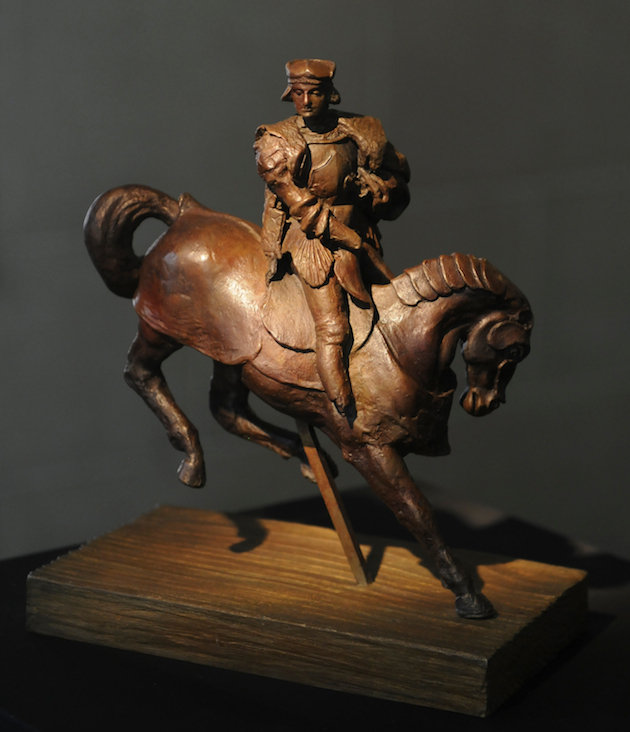
2012 bronze casting of Horse and Rider

In 1987 art collector Richard A. Lewis acquired the 1985 latex mold. Beginning in 2012, Lewis and a team of experts "pulled" a wax from the latex mold and, using the lost wax process, cast the Horse and Rider sculpture in bronze.

Bronze castings were sold with a certificate of authenticity stating each to be one of 996 castings, which were available in three different applied patinas and in silver. They were at sale for $25,000–35,000 each. The plan to cast up to 1000 statues however never reached fruition, and the art gallery fulfilling orders sold around 70 replicas. Some of the replicas have since been for sale with the option of joint ownership to the 2012 bronze cast.

The 2012 bronze casting was unveiled to the public in August 2012 at Grey Stone Mansion in Beverly Hills, California. It has been exhibited in Las Vegas, Dallas, San Diego, and in 2016 in Milan. In 2015 the mold made of Leonardo's beeswax model, together with the 2012 bronze casting, were acquired by another private collector. Since then, further bronze castings have been exhibited in New York, London, Miami, and Oregon.

The latex mold and one of the bronzes were put up for no-reserve auction in October 2019 at Guernsey's. The promoters appraised them somewhere between $30 and $50 million. In an auction on 30 October the sculpture failed to find a buyer, and the price was dropped to $10 million. A Bloomberg article described the auction as a "flop".

== See also ==
- List of works by Leonardo da Vinci
