= The Abencerraje =

- Author: Anonymous
- Language: Spanish
- Set in: Spain, c. 1410-1424
- Publisher: Antonio de Villegas
- Publication place: Spain
- Media type: Print

The Abencerraje, also known as The History of the Abencerraje and the Lovely Jarifa (Modern Spanish: Historia del Abencerraje y la hermosa Jarifa), is a 'Moorish novel' (novela morisca) written in Spain in the sixteenth century. Although it was published anonymously, some scholars believe that its author was Jerónimo Jiménez de Urrea. Various versions were published between 1561 and 1565. However, the most polished and complete is considered to be that included in the Inventario, a compilation by Antonio de Villegas printed in Medina del Campo in 1565. The novel takes place in the 15th century, when Castile and the Emirate of Granada were competing for supremacy over southern Spain. It shows how its characters, the Moor Abindarráez and the Christian Rodrigo de Narváez, can live in harmony despite their religious differences. It explores themes such as love and chivalry.

== Synopsis ==
The tale is set in the 15th century, when John II ruled the Crown of Castile. We meet Rodrigo de Narváez, a knight whose heroic feats in the war against the Moors had him appointed governor of the Málaga towns Álora and Antequera. On a patrol of Álora, Narváez and his men split up, with four squires following Narváez and five going alone. The group of five encounters a Moorish man on a horse and attacks him. The group is defeated, and Narváez comes over to fight the man. The exhausted Moor falls to the ground, but says that he must not be defeated. Narváez helps him up and asks him to explain himself.

The Moor introduces himself as Abindarráez the Younger, a scion of the Abencerrajes. Once the pre-eminent noble family of Granada, the king of Granada executed the Abencerrajes and ten others supposedly plotting his assassination. The people of Granada mourned their deaths. The king decided that no Abencerraje was to live in Granada except Abindarráez's father and uncle. Any future Abencerraje must be raised outside the city, any daughter married outside. Abindarráez was therefore raised by the governor of Cártama, alongside the governor's daughter, Jarifa. The children formed a close bond and, when they eventually learned that they were not related, fell in love. When the king of Granada moved the governor to Coín, leaving the youths behind, Jarifa confessed her love to Abindarráez. Abindarráez, then, was riding past Álora to attend his wedding in Coín. Moved, Rodrigo de Narváez allows Abindarráez to go to Coín if he promises to return in three days to be Narváez's captive.

Abindarráez finishes his journey to Coín where he and Jarifa marry. Jarifa tells Abindarráez of her plan to give him ownership over her father's land. Abindarráez then tells Jarifa the promise he made to Narváez, and Jarifa insists on going with him to Álora. On the way, an old man tells them how, while Narváez was governor of Antequera, he fell in love with a beautiful lady. However, since she was married, she spurned him. Later, after her husband praised Narváez, she professed her love for him, but Narváez left upon learning that she was married.

When the newlyweds arrive at Álora, Rodrigo de Narváez gives them food and a room, and treats Abindarráez's wounds. Abindarráez asks Narváez for help solving his troubles; Narváez writes to the king of Granada, promising that he will pay his prisoners' ransom as long as the king makes Jarifa's father pardon them for marrying without his consent. Jarifa's father begrudgingly does so, and the couple returns to Coín. There Abindarráez sends his gratitude and respect to Narváez, as well as six thousand gold coins, four horses, four lances with golden hilts and tips, and four shields. Narváez accepts everything but the gold, which he sends back. Finally, he writes to Jarifa explaining his love and respect for Abindarráez.

== Themes ==
=== Generosity ===
Generosity is thematised throughout The Abencerraje. Rodrigo de Narváez generously allows Abindarráez to go to Coín to marry Jarifa, where other stories of the time would have had Narváez kill or capture him. Narváez then allows the newlyweds to stay with him and helps them besides. Abindarráez repays Narváez with his generous gift (the gold component of which Narváez refuses).

=== Valour ===
Although Rodrigo de Narváez is the celebrated knight, the theme of valour is most evident in Abindarráez, who single-handedly bests squire after squire until the fresh Narváez intervenes. It is later revealed that Abindarráez's strength came from his love for his lady Jarifa.

=== Chivalry ===
Chivalry is evident in both protagonists. The Abencerraje is striking for extending chivalry to the Moorish character: Abindarráez displays great loyalty and valour fighting for his lady, and honesty in returning to Rodrigo de Narváez. Narváez for his part treats the captured Abindarráez with respect and dignity, cuts him a generous deal, and treats him like royalty on his return.

=== Loyalty ===
Loyalty is displayed by Abindarráez after he is captured: he returns Narváez as promised. Jarifa displays great loyalty in going with him, and Narváez in sticking to his word.

== Stage adaptation ==
The National Classic Theatre Company premiered a stage version of The Abencerraje at the Pavón Theatre in Madrid in 2014, for the 37th Almagro International Classical Theatre Festival. It was directed by Borja Rodríguez and performed as La Hermosa Jarifa (The Lovely Jarifa). The play ran until 2016.

== See also ==
- Novela morisca
- Moors
- Málaga
- Chivalric romance
