= Claudio Bonoldi =

Italian tenor (1783–1846)

- 1820 engraving by Luigi Rados
- Born: 26 October 1783; Piacenza, Duchy of Parma and Piacenza
- Died: 14 February 1846 (aged 62); Milan, Kingdom of Lombardy–Venetia, Austrian Empire
- Occupation: Operatic tenor
- Years active: 1803–1842

Claudio Bonoldi (26 October 1783 – 14 February 1846) was an Italian operatic tenor.

== Musical career ==
Bonoldi started his career as a lyric tenor, particularly suited to cover roles in opera buffa. Over the time, when his vocal timbre became darker and more resonant, he interpreted more dramatic parts, such as Pollione in Vincenzo Bellini's Norma. He also sang the roles of bass, such as Assur in Semiramide by Gioachino Rossini and Don Giovanni by Wolfgang Amadeus Mozart. His voice was categorised as baritenor.

He studied singing in his hometown of Piacenza with maestro Giacomo Carcani (1734–1820) and perfected his vocal training with maestro B. Gherardi. He began his career in 1803 at Teatro d'Angennes in Turin performing in parts of second half character. He made his debut at Teatro alla Scala in Milan in 1811 as Peronio in the premiere performance of Giuseppe Farinelli's Annibale in Capua. Rossini wrote for him the role of Giocondo for La pietra del paragone that was premiered on 26 September 1812 at La Scala.

Bonoldi has performed in many noted opera houses around Italy such as Teatro San Carlo in Naples, Teatro Argentina in Rome, Teatro Sant'Agostino in Genoa, Teatro Comunale in Bologna, Teatro Ducale in Parma, Teatro Carcano in Milan, Teatro la Fenice in Venice, Teatro Regio in Turin, Teatro Comunale in Trieste, Teatro della Società in Rovigo, Teatro Avvalorati in Livorno, Teatro Filarmonico in Verona, Teatro Municipale in Piacenza, Teatro Lirico in Padua, Teatro Riccardi in Bergamo and Teatro Municipale in Cuneo.

Public success that he achieved in Italy allowed him to engage in theaters around France and Spain, where he received the nomination of virtuoso da camera from the King of Spain Ferdinand VII.

He retired from stage in 1842 and later teach opera singing at Milan Conservatory. He died in Milan in 1846.

== Repertoire ==
- Giuseppe Farinelli
  - Annibale in Capua (Peronio), Milan, 1811
  - La chiarina (L'aiutante), Milan, 1815
- Giuseppe Mosca
  - Le bestie in uomini (Riccardo), Milan, 1812
  - I pretendenti delusi (Il conte Odoardo), Milan, 1813
- Stefano Pavesi
  - Nitteti (Amasi), Turin, 1811
  - Ser Marcantonio (Medoro), Milan, 1812
  - I riti d'Efeso (Agenore), Parma, 1812
  - Un avvertimento ai gelosi (il conte di Ripaverde), Milan, 1813
  - La muta di Portici (Masaniello), Venice, 1831
- Pietro Generali
  - Adelina (Erneville), Trieste, 1812
  - L'amore prodotto dall'odio (Don Rammiro), Milan, 1813
  - Bajazet (Acmet), Turin, 1813
  - I baccanali di Roma (Sempronio), Faenza, 1818
  - Adelaide di Borgogna (Ottone), Milan, 1819
- Pietro Alessandro Guglielmi
  - Ernesto e Palmira (Ernesto), Milan, 1813
- Ercole Paganini
  - Cesare in Egitto (Tolomeo), Turin, 1814
- Carlo Coccia
  - Euristea (Tebandro), Venice, 1815
- Ferdinando Paër
  - L'eroismo in amore, Milan, 1815
- Joseph Weigl
  - Il ritorno d'Astrea (Cantata), Milan, 1815
  - La famiglia svizzera (Jakob), Milan, 1816
- Michele Carafa
  - Ifigenia in Tauride (Oreste), Naples, 1817
- Peter Winter
  - I due Valdomiri (Ulrico), Milan, 1817
- Giovanni Pacini
  - Vallace (Vallace), Milan, 1820
  - Temistocle (Temistocle), Milan, 1823
- Gioachino Rossini
  - La pietra del paragone (Giocondo), Milan, 1812
  - Sigismondo (Ladislao), Turin, 1814
  - Armida (Ubaldo e Germano), Naples, 1817
  - Ciro in Babilonia (Baldassarre), Milan, 1818
  - Otello (Otello), Trieste, 1818
  - Bianca e Falliero (Contareno), Milan, 1819
  - Aureliano in Palmira (Aureliano), Venice, 1820
  - Eduardo e Cristina (Carlo), Lucca, 1820
  - Maometto secondo (Paolo Erisso), Milan, 1824
  - Semiramide (Assur), Padua, 1824
- Domenico Cimarosa
  - Gli Orazi e i Curiazi (Marco Orazio), Parma, 1811
- Giovanni Paisiello
  - Il barbiere di Siviglia (Lindoro), Milan, 1811
- Giovanni Simone Mayr
  - Elisa (Teorindo), Milan, 1813
  - La rosa bianca e la rosa rossa (Vanoldo), Genoa, 1813
  - Ginevra di Scozia (Polinesso), Milan, 1816
  - Atar (Assur), Genoa, 1814
- Vincenzo Bellini
  - Norma (Pollione), Milan, 1832
  - Beatrice di Tenda (Filippo Visconti), Milan, 1833
- Gaetano Donizetti
  - L'esule di Roma (Fulvio) Trieste, 1833
  - Torquato Tasso (Torquato Tasso), Cuneo, 1835
  - Il furioso all'isola di San Domingo (Cardenio), Cuneo, 1835
- Giacomo Meyerbeer
  - Semiramide riconosciuta (Ircano), Turin, 1819
- Wolfgang Amadeus Mozart
  - Don Giovanni (Don Giovanni), Milan, 1816
- Carlo Evasio Soliva
  - La testa di bronzo (Federico), Milan, 1816
  - Berenice d'Armenia (Lucio Antonino), Turin, 1816
  - Giulia e Sesto Pompeo (Ottavio), Milan, 1817
- Paolo Bonfichi
  - Abradate e Dircea (Ciro), Turin, 1817
  - Beniowski (Igor), Venice, 1831
- Gaspare Spontini
  - La Vestale (Cinna), Milan, 1824
- Gustavo Carulli
  - I tre mariti (Belmont), Milan, 1824
- Francesco Sampieri
  - Pompeo in Siria (Clearco), Milan, 1824
- Antonio Sapienza
  - Gonzalvo (Ferdinando), Milan, 1825
- Giuseppe Persiani
  - Danao re d'Argo (Danao), Livorno, 1827
- Giuseppe Nicolini
  - Ilda D'Avenel (Fergusto), Bergamo, 1828
  - Il conte di Lenosse (Clarendon), Venice, 1830
- Ramon Carnicier
  - Elena e Costantino, Barcelona, 1822
  - Don Giovanni Tentorio, Barcelona, 1822

== Bibliography ==
- Giampiero Tintori, 200 ans d'opéra La Scala, Ken Art S.A. Editeur, Geneva, 1979.
- Rodolfo Celletti, Voce di tenore. Dal Rinascimento a oggi, storia e tecnica, ruoli e protagonisti di un mito della lirica, Idea Libri, Milan, 1989. ISBN 88-7082-127-7
- Giorgio Appolonia, Le voci di Rossini, prefazione di Giorgio Gualerzi, Eda, Turin, 1992.
- Gustavo Marchesi, Canto e cantanti, Casa Ricordi, Milan, 1996.
- Evaristo Pagani, Raccolte Biografiche Cantanti Lirici Italiani, edito in proprio, Albino, 2009.
- Franco C. Ricci, Bonoldi, Claudio, in Alberto Maria Ghisalberti (a cura di), Dizionario Biografico degli Italiani, Rome, Istituto della Enciclopedia Italiana, 1971, volume 12 (on-line in Treccani.it)
