= Mirabassi =

Mirabassi is an Italian surname probably derived from a medieval nickname Mirabasso. Notable people with the surname include:

- Gabriele Mirabassi (born 1967), Italian jazz clarinetist
- Giovanni Mirabassi (born 1970), Italian jazz pianist

== See also ==
- Bassi (surname)
