= Ferdinando Carulli =

Italian composer (1770–1841)

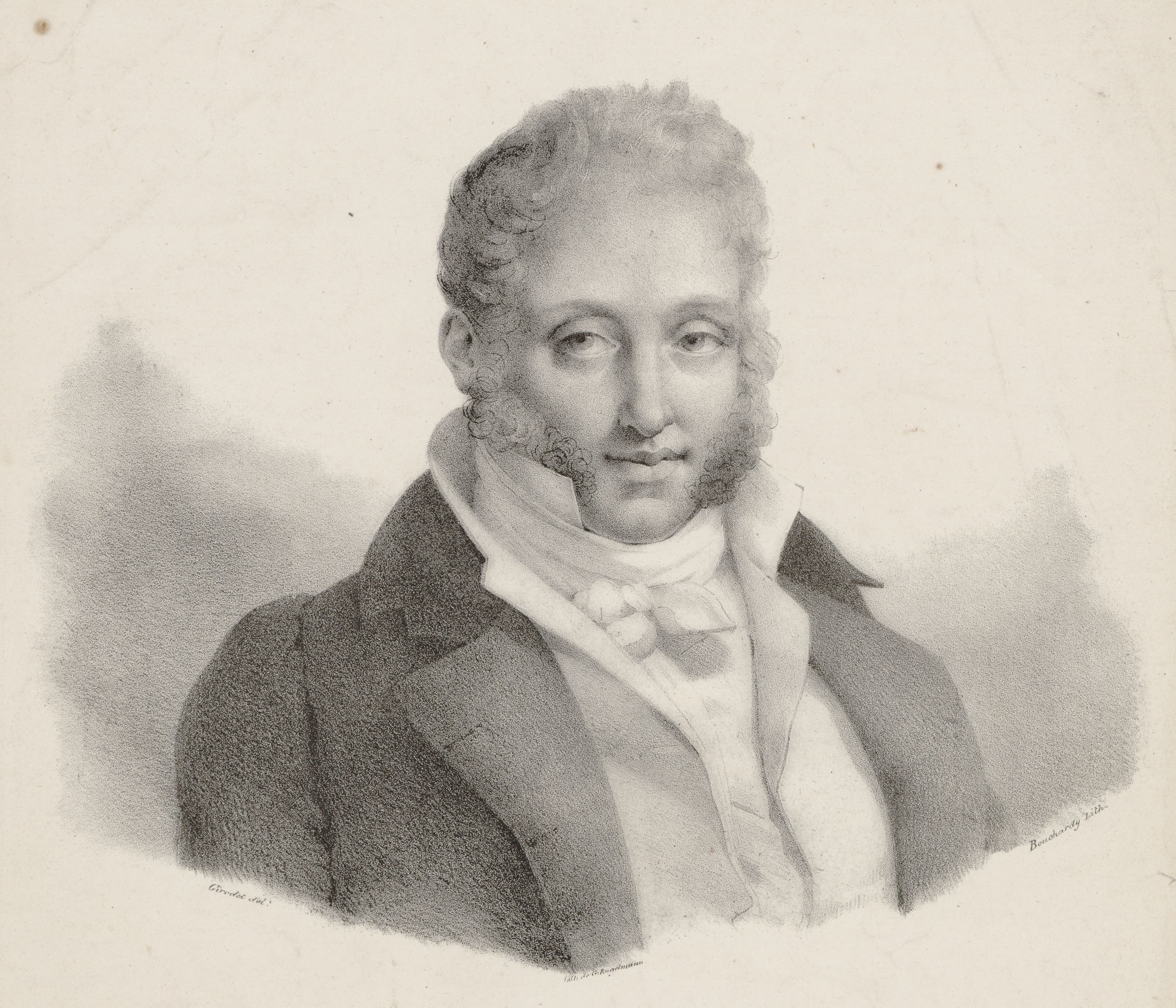
Ferdinando Carulli

Ferdinando Maria Meinrado Francesco Pascale Rosario Carulli (9 February 1770 – 17 February 1841) was an Italian composer for classical guitar and the author of the influential Méthode complète pour guitare ou lyre, op. 27 (1810), which contains music still used by student guitarists today. He wrote a variety of works for classical guitar, including numerous solo and chamber works and several concertos. He was an extremely prolific writer, composing over 400 works for the instrument.

== Biography ==
Carulli was born to an affluent, upper-class family in Naples. His father, Michele, was a distinguished literator, secretary to the delegate of the Neapolitan Jurisdiction.

Like many of his contemporaries, Carulli was taught musical theory by a priest, who was also an amateur musician. Carulli's first instrument was the cello, taught to him by the local priest. At the age of twenty, Carulli discovered the guitar and devoted his life to the study and advancement of this instrument. As there were no professional guitar teachers in Naples at the time, Carulli developed his own style of playing.

Carulli was a gifted performer. His concerts in Naples were so popular that he soon began touring Europe. Around 1801, Carulli married a French woman, Marie-Josephine Boyer, and had a son with her. A few years later, Carulli started to compose in Milan, where he contributed to local publications. After a highly successful Paris tour, Carulli moved there. At the time, the city was known as the 'music capital' of the world, and he stayed there for the rest of his life.

Carulli became highly successful as a guitar teacher in Paris. It was also here that the majority of his works were published. Later in his life, he became a self-publisher. In addition to his own music, he published the works of other prominent guitarists, including Filippo Gragnani, whom he befriended and who later dedicated three guitar duets to Carulli.

Toward the end of his life, Carulli also began to experiment with instrument making. In collaboration with Parisian luthier René Lacôte, he developed a 10-string instrument, the Decacorde.

Carulli died in Paris on 17 February 1841, eight days after his 71st birthday.

== Music/style ==
Opus 114 No. 1
The first piece from Carulli's Opus 114

Opus 114 No. 2
The second piece from Carulli's Opus 114

Carulli was among the most prolific composers of his time. He wrote more than four hundred works for the guitar, and countless others for various instrumental combinations, always including the guitar. His most influential work, the "Method, op. 27", published in 1810, contains pieces still widely used today in training students of the classical guitar. Along with numerous works for two guitars, works for guitar with violin or flute, and three concertos for guitar with chamber orchestra, Carulli also composed several works for guitar and piano (in collaboration with his son, Gustavo).

Many of the pieces now regarded as Carulli's finest were initially turned down by publishers who considered them too difficult for the average recreational guitarist. It is likely that many of his best works remained unpublished and are now lost. Nevertheless, several of Carulli's published works point to the likely quality and sophistication of his concert music, the Six Andantes Op. 320 (dedicated to the guitarist Matteo Carcassi) is a good example. The great majority of Carulli's surviving works, however, were those considered marketable enough by mainstream Parisian publishers aiming at an amateur recreational market.

In addition to his highly successful Methode Op. 27 (which went through four editions during his lifetime and a major revision, as Op. 241), Carulli also published several supplements to the method, along with a method without explanatory text (L'Anti Methode Op. 272), a method for the decacorde, a harmony treatise, a treatise dealing with guitar accompaniment of the voice, and several collections of vocalises and solfèges. The latter studies were intended to exploit the guitar's accompanying capabilities, and to be used by both singer-guitarist amateurs and voice teachers who were not proficient figured bass readers.

Classical guitarists have recorded many of his works. Arguably, his most famous work is a duet for guitar and flute, which was recorded by Alexander Lagoya and Jean-Pierre Rampal, although his Duo in G Op.34 achieved a measure of indirect fame in Britain as the theme tune of cult 1980s science fiction/television game show The Adventure Game. The Duo in G has been recorded several times, most famously by Julian Bream and John Williams.

== Instruments used by Carulli ==
Among the guitars used by Carulli, one finds

- Guitar around 1810 (photos)
  According to Philip James Bone's book The guitar and mandolin : biographies of celebrated players and composers for these instruments (p. 70, 71), this instrument was presented by Ferdinando Carulli to his son Gustave Carulli. The initials GC can be seen on the instrument, at either side of the bridge.
- Pierre René Lacôte, Guitar called Décacorde
  Carulli worked together with Lacote to create the 10-string Décacorde. There exists a patent for this instrument. It is speculated that the original "invention" and patent was aimed at amateur guitarists: in the patent configuration, only the 5 lower strings are fretted. On the other hand, there also exist other configurations, where 6 or 7 strings are fretted, and it is speculated that these Décacordes were played professionally.

== Compositions ==
- See List of compositions by Ferdinando Carulli
