= Abencerrages =

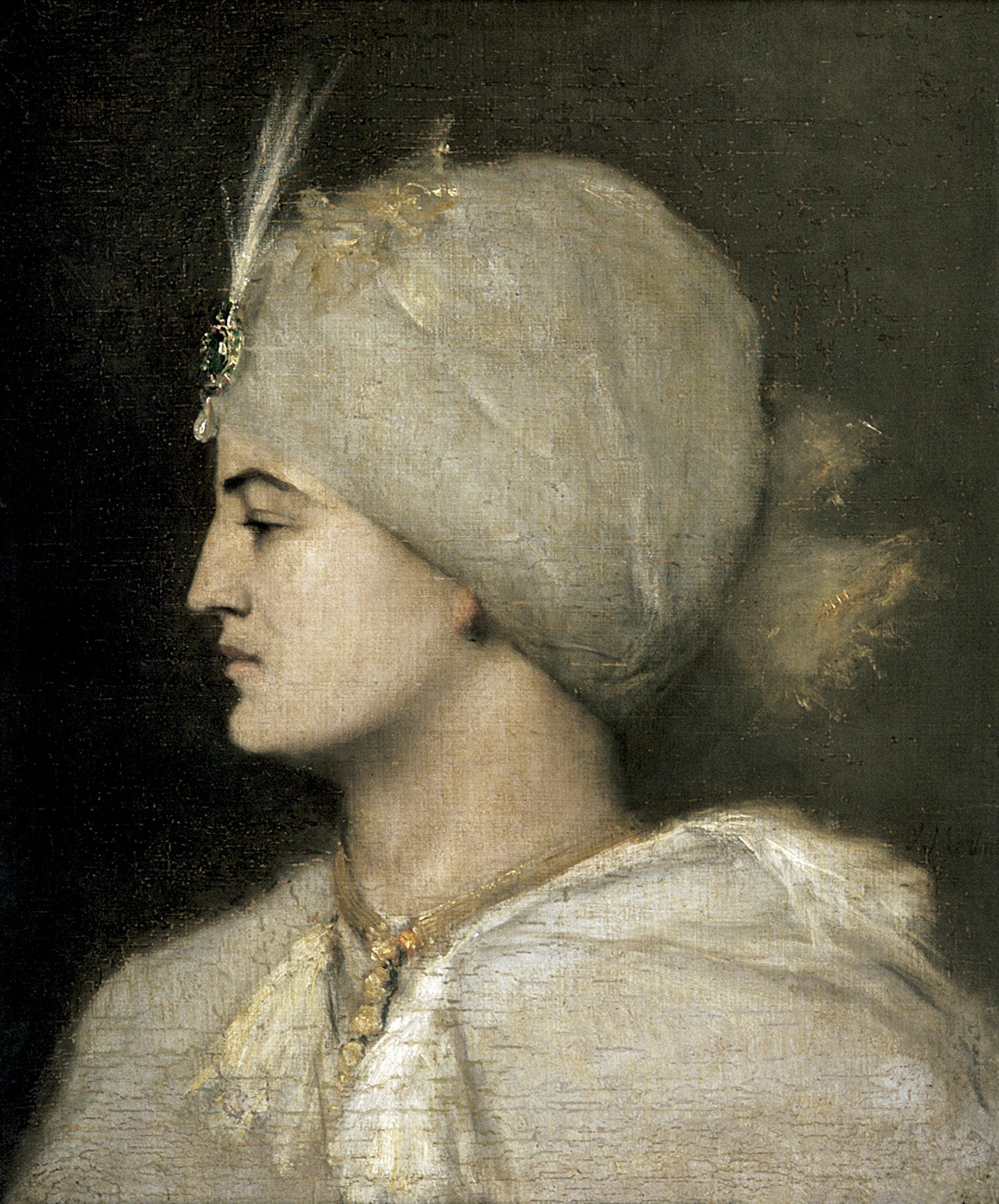
El último abencerraje (The last Abencerrage) by Ignacio Merino

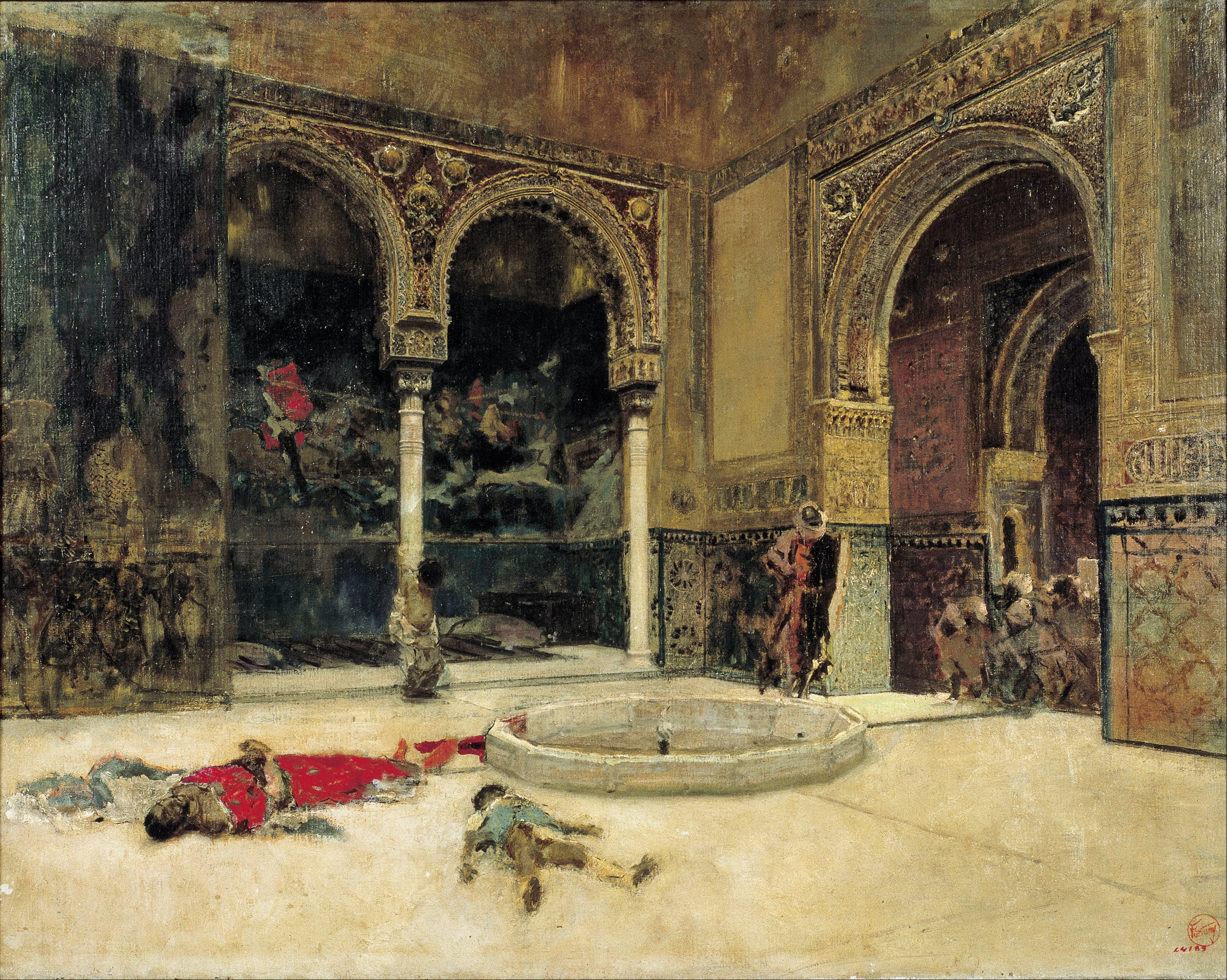
The Slaying of the Abencerrages, by Marià Fortuny (1870)

The Abencerrages or Abencerrajes (Modern Spanish: [aβenθeˈraxes], Old Spanish: [aβent͡s̻eˈraʒes̺]; from the Arabic ابن سراج, Ibn Sarrāj, 'Saddler's Son', pl. بنو سراج, Banū Sarrāj) were a family or faction that is said to have held a prominent position in the Kingdom of Granada in the 15th century.

The name appears to have been derived from Yussuf ben-Serragh, the head of the tribe in the time of Muhammed VII, Sultan of Granada (1370–1408), who did that sovereign good service in his struggles to retain the crown of which he was three times deprived.

Little is known of the family with certainty. The Chambers Biographical Dictionary records that they arrived in Spain in the 8th century but the name is familiar from the romance by Ginés Pérez de Hita, Guerras civiles de Granada, which celebrates the feuds of the Abencerrages and the rival family of the Benedin (Arabic banu Edin), and the cruel treatment to which the former were subjected. J. P. de Florian's Gonsalve de Cordoue and Chateaubriand's Le dernier des Abencerrages are adaptations of Pérez de Hita's story.

The story is told that one of the Abencerrages, having fallen in love with a lady of the royal family, was caught in the act of climbing up to her window. The assassinations were ordered by Ibrahim Benedin, who had a feud with the family. He was enraged and shut up the whole family in one of the halls of the Alhambra, and gave orders to kill them all. The apartment where this is said to have taken place is one of the most beautiful courts of the Alhambra, and is still called the Hall of the Abencerrages.

Washington Irving in Tales of the Alhambra (1832) disagrees, saying the massacre was a fiction, but that a number of Abencerrages were killed in one of the battles at the time. Nonetheless, many poems and plays, including Romance de la pérdida de Alhama, the novella The Abencerraje, and two operas (Les Abencérages, by Luigi Cherubini, and L'esule di Granata, by Giacomo Meyerbeer) mention the legend.
