= Semiramide riconosciuta =

Opera libretto by Pietro Metastasio

Semiramide riconosciuta (Semiramis recognized or revealed) is an opera libretto by Pietro Metastasio (1698–1782), written in 1729. It is for opera seria, and accordingly consists of recitatives and da capo arias. It tells a story of the legendary Semiramis, wife of the Biblical Nimrod.

== Characters ==
The voice types and character descriptions are taken from the text set to music in 1729 by Leonardo Vinci:

- Semiramide (soprano), Assyrian queen, in masculine dress under the name Nimrod; in love with Scitalce, who had previously known her in Egypt under the name Idreno
- Mirteo (soprano), Egyptian prince, brother of Semiramis (though he does not know this), in love with Tamiri
- Ircano (contralto), Scythian prince, in love with Tamiri
- Scitalce (contralto), Indian prince, in love with Semiramide
- Tamiri (soprano), Bactrian princess, in love with Scitalce
- Sibari (tenor), confidante of and secretly in love with Semiramide

== Operas ==
The libretto has been used as the text for operas by several composers, including:

- Semiramide riconosciuta by Leonardo Vinci, premiered 6 February 1729
- Semiramide riconosciuta by Nicola Porpora, premiered 26 December 1729
- Semiramide riconosciuta by Niccolò Jommelli, premiered 1741
- Semiramide riconosciuta by Giovanni Battista Lampugnani, premiered 1741
- Semiramide riconosciuta by Johann Adolph Hasse, premiered 26 December 1744
- La Semiramide riconosciuta by Domènec Terradellas, premiered 1746
- La Semiramide riconosciuta by Christoph Willibald Gluck, premiered 1748
- La Semiramide riconosciuta by Baldassare Galuppi, premiered 1749
- La Semiramide riconosciuta by Giovanni Marco Rutini, premiered 1752
- Semiramide riconosciuta by Gioacchino Cocchi, premiered 1753
- Semiramide riconosciuta by Andrea Bernasconi, premiered 1765
- Semiramide by Josef Mysliveček, premiered 1766, Bergamo
- Semiramide by Antonio Salieri, premiered 1782
- Semiramide riconosciuta by Giacomo Meyerbeer, premiered 1819
