= L'esule di Granata =

1822 melodramma serio (serious opera) in two acts by Giacomo Meyerbeer

- Opera by Giacomo Meyerbeer
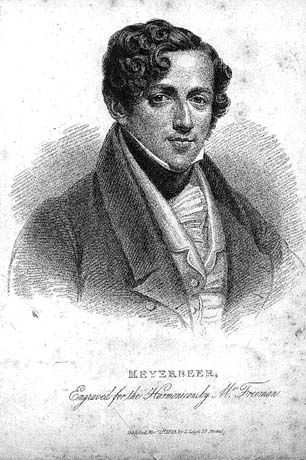
- Meyerbeer, c. 1825
- Translation: The Exile of Granada
- Librettist: Felice Romani
- Language: Italian
- Premiere: 12 March 1822; La Scala, Milan

L'esule di Granata (The Exile of Granada) is a melodramma serio (serious opera) in two acts by Giacomo Meyerbeer. The Italian libretto was by Felice Romani based on the rivalries between the Zegridi and the Abenceraggi factions in the last days of the kingdom of Granada. It is the fifth of Meyerbeer's Italian operas but had only three confirmed stagings in the 19th century. The world premiere took place at La Scala, Milan, on 12 March, 1822.

== Background ==
Born in Berlin to a wealthy family, as a young man Giacomo Meyerbeer had musical ambitions and studied and traveled in Italy. Much impressed and influenced by the leading Italian composer of operas of the day, Rossini, Meyerbeer composed an opera in the style of that composer, Romilda e Costanza, which was produced in Padua in 1817. He then went on to compose three further operas in Italian for three different cities – Semiramide riconosciuta, Turin 1819, Emma di Resburgo, Venice, also 1819, and Margherita d'Anjou, for La Scala, Milan, 1820. These three operas all had enthusiastic receptions from audiences and critics and Meyerbeer then went to Rome to present a new opera for the Teatro Argentina there. The opera was to have been called L'Almanzore, with a text probably by Gaetano Rossi, based on a play by Jean-Pierre Claris de Florian which had already served as the basis for an opera by Cherubini, Les Abencerages, presented in Paris in 1813. However both Meyerbeer and the leading lady of the piece fell ill during rehearsals, and the project was abandoned. The libretto was reworked by Felice Romani, new music composed, and the opera given under the title L'esule di Granata at La Scala.

== Roles ==
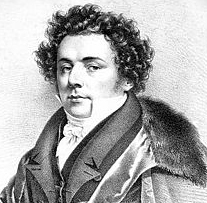
Luigi Lablache, who created the role of Sulemano

Roles, voice types, and premiere cast
Role	Voice type	Premiere cast, 12 March 1822 Conductor: Giacomo Meyerbeer
Almanzor, king of Granada	(mezzo-soprano or alto)	Benedetta Rosmunda Pisaroni
Azema, a young princess	soprano	Adelaide Tosi
Sulemano, exiled king of Granada	bass	Luigi Lablache
Alamar, leader of the Zegris	tenor	Berardo Calvari Winter
Ali	tenor	Carlo Siber
Omar	bass	Lorenzo Biondi
Fatima	soprano	Carolina Sivelli

== Synopsis ==
Place: The Kingdom of Granada in Moorish Spain

Time: End of the 15th Century

A feud between two dynasties, the Abencerrages and the Zegris, furnishes the action of the plot. Despite the hatred between the families, Almanzor, an Abencerrage ruler, and Azema, a young Zegri princess, have fallen in love and wish to marry. When Azema's father, who has been banished, hears of this, he returns to Granada and hatches a plot to assassinate Almanzor. The conspiracy is discovered however and the murder prevented. Azema asks Almanzor to forgive her father, which he does, and Azema and Almanzor are wed, to general rejoicing.

== Reception and performance history ==
The first production at La Scala, Milan, was only moderately successful despite the presence of popular stars of opera of the day in the cast. Two later stagings have been traced, one being at the Teatro della Pergola in Florence in 1826, the other in London in 1829. A planned staging in Paris in 1828 was abandoned.

== Musical features ==
An expansive structure in the opening of the opera, grandiose orchestral effects including a stage band, and elaborate choruses and ensembles are features of this opera.

== Recordings ==
- 2006: Almanzor: Manuela Custer, Azema: Laura Claycomb, Sulemano: Mirco Palazzi, Alamar: Paul Austin Kelly; Academy of St Martin in the Fields, Geoffrey Mitchell Choir, Giuliano Carella, conductor; CD: Opera Rara Cat: 234
