= Carolina Bassi =

Italian contralto

Carolina Bassi Banna
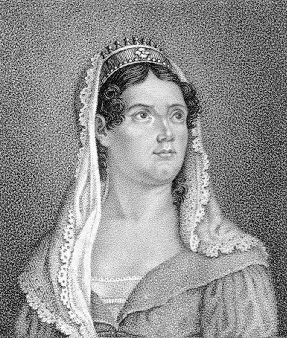
- Born: Carolina Bassi; 10 January 1781; Naples, Italy
- Died: 12 December 1862 (aged 81); Cremona, Italy
- Occupation: Contralto

Carolina Bassi (10 January 1781 – 12 December 1862) was an Italian contralto who knew Rossini, Meyerbeer, Donizetti and Bellini.

== Life ==
Bassi was born in Naples to a musician family. Her brother Nicola, was a famous buffo bass; and another brother, Adolfo, who was a composer, operatic tenor and also an impresario of the Teatro Nuovo in Trieste.

She retired in 1828, devoting herself to teaching opera singing. She died in Cremona in 1862.

=== Family ===
Bassi was married to Cremona's nobleman, Pietro Manna. They had a son, Ruggero Manna (1808–1864), a composer and Chapel Master of the Cathedral of Cremona from 1835 to 1864.

== Musical career ==
Bassi was known as "La Napoletana", one of the noted singers of her era. She was the first interpreter of many works of her repertoire. The roles that gave her a particular success were Semiramide riconosciuta, Margherita d'Anjou, L'esule di Granata, all by Meyerbeer, Bianca e Falliero by Rossini, and some works by Giovanni Pacini and Saverio Mercadante. She performed in many noted Italian and foreign theatres, including Teatro alla Scala in Milan, Teatro Regio in Turin, Teatro Comunale in Bologna, Teatro di San Carlo in Naples, Teatro La Fenice in Venice.

She sung in premiere performances of the following operas:

- Teseo e Medea by Carlo Coccia (Teatro Regio di Torino, 1815)
- Maometto by Peter Winter (Teatro alla Scala, 1815)
- La rosa bianca e la rosa rossa by Pietro Generali (Theater Regio di Torino, 1818)
- Semiramide riconosciuta by Giacomo Meyerbeer (Theater Regio di Torino, 3 February 1819)
- Bianca e Falliero by Gioacchino Rossini (Teatro alla Scala, 26 December 1819)
- Wallace o L'eroe scozzese by Giovanni Pacini (Teatro alla Scala, 1820)
- Maria Stuarda regina di Scozia by Saverio Mercadante (Teatro Comunale di Bologna, 1821)
- Ezio by Mercadante (Teatro Regio di Torino, 1827)
- Gastone di Foix by Giuseppe Persiani (Teatro La Fenice, 1827)
- I saraceni in Sicilia ovvero Eufemio di Messina by Francesco Morlacchi (Teatro La Fenice, 1828).
