= Gustavo Carulli =

Italian-French musician (1801–1876)

Gustavo Carulli (15 June 1801 – 27 October 1876), called Gustave Carulli in French publications, was a composer, musician (pianist, singer, guitarist) and music teacher.

== Life ==
Born at Livorno, he was the son of guitarist, singer and composer Ferdinando Carulli and the French Marie-Josephine Boyer. Gustavo learned the guitar and singing from his father, Ferdinando who, besides his well-known guitar works (such as his Méthode complette pour guitarre, op. 27, composed expressly for the instruction of his son), also published and arranged works for singers and even a method of singing and accompaniment of singing.

Young Gustavo went to Paris with his father, where he studied piano under the Polish Mirecki, harmony with Nicolo Isouard and composition with Ferdinando Paer.

In 1825 his opera I tre mariti was performed in La Scala in Milan.

In 1838 Gustavo Carulli published his Méthode de chant dedicated to Gilbert Duprez. Numerous of the teaching methods therein, were incorporated into Solfège des solfèges where he collaborated with Henri Lemoine; later Adolphe-Léopold Danhauser augmented Solfège des solfèges with additional lessons.

Carulli is said to also have been fluent in an earlier style "the galant phraseology of the 1780s".

He gave singing classes in his dwelling Rue de Provence 63 bis., living only 2 numbers away from Franz Liszt.

In 1847, two of Gustavo Carulli's songs were awarded prizes in a Concours des chants populaires.

Later he moved to Boulogne-sur-Mer, where he remained until his death. There one of his students was Alexandre Guilmant whom he taught harmony, counterpoint and fugue.

== Works ==
See External links below, for works referenced in catalogues.

- Methode pour la guitare, Op. 4
- Quadrille, sur les motifs de L'Opera La Semiramide (Musique de G. Rossini, Arrangee pour le Piano-Forte, par Gustave Carulli)
- Quadrilles, from the Opera of "La Gazza Ladra" by Rossini, arranged for the piano-forte by Gustave Carulli
- Six Sonatines très-faciles pour le Pianoforte, composée par G. Carulli. Leipzig, Hofmeister
- Tre cantibile per piano-forte
- Repertorio per gli allievi, ossia raccolta di diversi motivi del celebre M Mayer
- Pot-pourri per Pian-forte e Violino estratt della Semiramide
- "Paganini" Trois airs variés pour le Violon, pour étre executes sur la quatrieme corde seulement, avec accompagnement de Piano, par Gustave Carulli
- Rondo brilliant, précédé d'un andante pour le piano
- Méthode du Chant, dediée à Duprez par G. Carulli, professeur du Chant
- Quinze vocalises a deux voix, faisant suite a la Methode
- Solfège des solfèges
- Les Feux Follets, Album de Chant avec accompagnement de Piano, pour 1842, Paroles de MM. Ancouet et E. Barateau, Musique de Gustave Carulli, contenant cinq Romances et cinq nocturnes
- Album de 1839; Paroles de Mme Tastu, MM. Aucoult et Barateau, Musique de Gustave Carulli
- Mélodies, pour trois voix égales
- Melodies referenced in Catalogue général des livres, ouvrages périodiques, journaux et morceaux de musique de la Bibliothèque Catholique de Termonde
- Etoile chérie, romance, musique de Gustave Carulli, paroles de Emile Barateau
- O mon Dieu, si ton bon plaisir, paroles de Corneille
- Pour qui rêve d'Amour, paroles de Barateau
- Si vous ne m'aimez plus! musique de G. Carulli, paroles de Em. Barateau
- Marie "Charle est a moi"
- Huit melodies pour trois voix egales, paroles de M. Alph. de Lamartine et autres auteurs
- Ding-Dong
- Tre canzonette, paroli di diversi autori, con accompagnamento di piano-forte
- G. Carulli: Leichte und gefällige Singübungen in Arien, Romanzen und Duetten von Donizetti, Bellini, Rossini u.s.w.
