= Adolfo Bassi =

Italian composer and operatic tenor

Adolfo Bassi (Naples, 1775 – Trieste, 1855) was an Italian composer and operatic tenor. Brother of the bass Nicola Bassi and the contralto Carolina Bassi-Manna, he was also an impresario of the Teatro Nuovo in Trieste.

== Operas ==
- Il Riccardo o Il finto cieco e sordo (1809, Teatro Nuovo, Trieste)
- L'ingiusta critica alle donne (1809, Teatro Nuovo, Trieste)
- La covacenere (1817, Teatro Nuovo, Trieste)
- I tre gobbi (1820, Teatro Grande, Trieste)
