= Antonio de Villegas =

Antonio de Villegas (Medina del Campo, Valladolid, España, c. 1522 – c. 1551) was a Spanish writer.

Together with Gregorio Silvestre and other disciples of Cristóbal de Castillejo, he stood against the Italianating tendencies of the poetry of his time.

He wrote works in prose and verse, gathered in a compilation titled Inventario (Inventory, 1565), which includes the story Historia del Abencerraje y la hermosa Jarifa, written in 1551 and considered the first Moorish novel. It tells how a Muslim, prisoner to a Christian named Rodrigo de Narváez, recovers his freedom by keeping his word and returning to prison after being released to marry his beloved Jarifa. However, modern critics deny Villegas the authorship of this novel.

The work's brevity and success caused it to be included, from 1561 onwards, after the fourth book of Jorge de Montemor's Diana. Lope de Vega wrote his comedy El remedio en la desdicha on this theme; Juan de Timoneda, Sebastián de Covarrubias and Miguel de Cervantes praised the Inventario. It also includes Ausencia y soledad de amor, a pastoral novel in prose and verse, and several poems (canciones, coplas, Historia de Píramo, Contienda de Áyax).
