= Bianca e Falliero =

Opera by Gioachino Rossini

- Opera by Gioachino Rossini
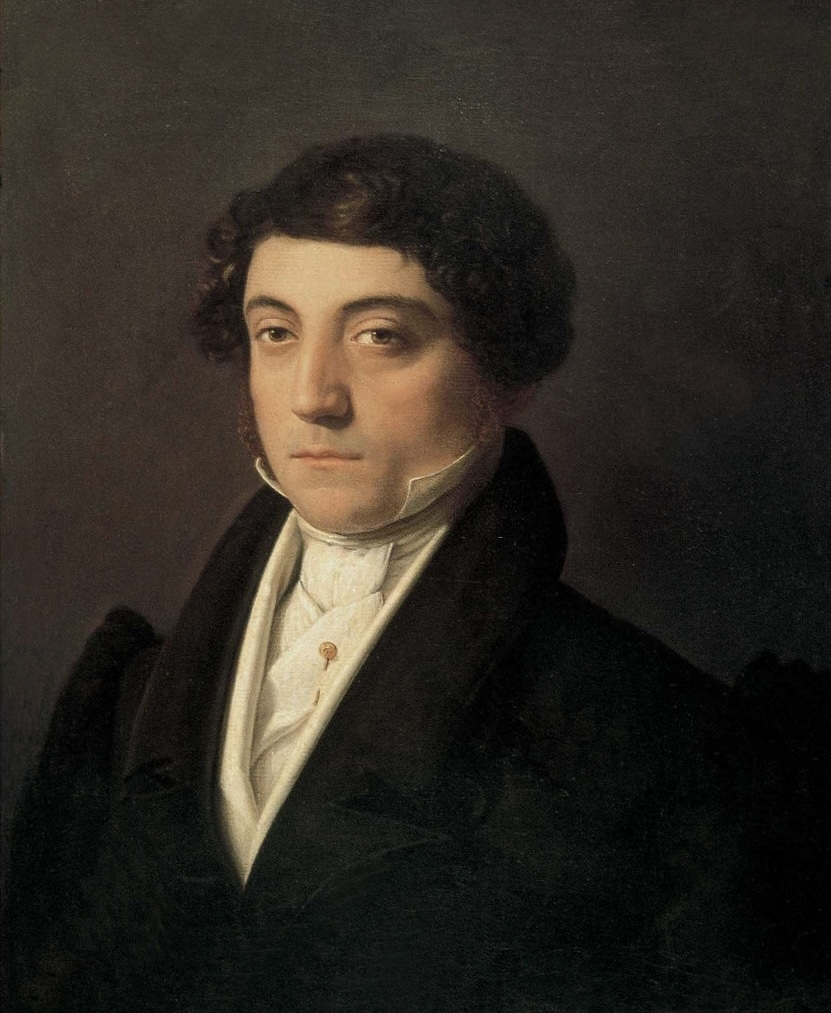
- Portrait of the composer
- Librettist: Felice Romani
- Language: Italian
- Based on: Les Vénitiens, ou Blanche et Montcassin by Antoine-Vincent Arnault (1798)
- Premiere: 26 December 1819; La Scala, Milan

Bianca e Falliero, ossia Il consiglio dei tre (English: Bianca and Falliero, or The Counsel of Three) is a two-act operatic melodramma by Gioachino Rossini to an Italian libretto by Felice Romani. The libretto was based on Antoine-Vincent Arnault's 1798 play Les Vénitiens, ou Blanche et Montcassin.

== Performance history ==
The opera premiered on 26 December 1819 at La Scala. Giuseppe Fioravanti, a popular basso buffo of the day and the son of composer Valentino Fioravanti, sang in the premiere. Carolina Bassi, Italian contralto considered one of the best in her day, also created a role in this opera.

The work was performed thirty times during the initial season in Milan and was performed throughout Italy and elsewhere to some extent before largely disappearing into obscurity after 1846. It was revived at the Rossini Opera Festival in Pesaro in 1986 with Katia Ricciarelli, Marilyn Horne, and Chris Merritt.

The opera is considered very difficult to sing due to the intensity of its coloratura writing.

== Roles ==
| Role | Voice type | Premiere Cast, 26 December 1819 (Conductors: Gioacchino Rossini and Alessandro Rolla) |
|---|---|---|
| Bianca, daughter of Contareno | soprano | Violante Camporesi |
| Capellio, Senator | bass | Giuseppe Fioravanti |
| Contareno, Senator | tenor | Claudio Bonoldi |
| Costanza, nurse of Bianca | soprano | Adelaide Ghinzani |
| Falliero, Venetian general | contralto | Carolina Bassi |
| Priuli, Doge of Venice | bass | Alessandro De Angeli |
| Pisani | tenor | Francesco Antonio Biscottini |
| Loredano, Senator | spoken role | |
Senators, noblemen and women, bailiffs, soldiers, servants

== Synopsis ==
Bianca e Falliero is a tale of emotional excess and bitter strife within war-threatened Venice. Falliero, the hero, comes home after defeating the enemies of Venice only to find his beloved Bianca promised to a rival and soon to be married.

Place: Venice
Time: 17th Century

=== Act 1 ===
Contareno offers his daughter Bianca in marriage to Capellio, a member of a rival clan, in an act of conciliation meant to end a long-standing family feud. Bianca, however, loves Falliero, rumoured to have recently died defending Venice from a military threat. She sings of her love for the young general in the cavatina Della rosa il bel vermiglio. When Falliero returns from the war and Bianca rebels against her father's plan for her, Contareno threatens to ruin Falliero. The wedding ceremony begins, but Bianca refuses to marry Capellio by not signing the marriage certificate. Falliero bursts onto the scene.

=== Act 2 ===
Falliero is forced to run from the scene of the wedding to escape the wrath of Bianca's father. Bianca again refuses to continue the ceremony. News arrives that Falliero has been captured and must stand trial for treason, allegedly for his contacts with a foreign power because he was found hiding in the Spanish Embassy. Unfortunately for him, his judges are to be the Council of Three: Contareno, Capellio and Loredano. Although Falliero does not defend his actions, Bianca passionately argues on his behalf. Eventually, Bianca's impassioned pleas convince Capellio that the two lovers belong together. All ends happily.

== Recycled and reused music ==
The quartet during the trial scene, Cielo, il mio labbro ispira, was reworked several times by Rossini over the years, and its popularity eventually outlasted that of the opera itself. The critic Stendhal considered this quartet to be one of Rossini's finest creations. In the sixteenth chapter of his essay On Love, he wrote that : "A sad and tender tune, provided that it is not too much dramatic, that imagination is not forced to consider action, as it entice oneself only to the daydreaming of love, is a delightful thing for miserable and tender souls; for instance the clarinet's prolonged part, at the beginning of the Bianca e Faliero [sic] quartetto, and the Camporesi's story around the middle of the quartetto."

The composer reused music from the rondo finale of his recent, well-received opera, La donna del lago in this work as well.

== Recordings ==
| Year | Cast: Bianca, Fallerio, Contareno, Capellio | Conductor, Opera House and Orchestra | Label |
|---|---|---|---|
| 1986 | Katia Ricciarelli, Marilyn Horne. Chris Merritt, Giorgio Surjan | Donato Renzetti, London Sinfonietta Opera Orchestra and Prague Philharmonic Choir (Audio and video recordings of a performance (or of performances) at the Rossini Opera Festival) | Audio CD: Legato Classics; Cat: LCD 138-3; DVD: House of Opera; DVDCC 246 |
| 2001 | Majella Cullagh, Jennifer Larmore. Barry Banks, Ildebrando D'Arcangelo | David Parry, The London Philharmonic Orchestra and The Geoffrey Mitchell Choir | Audio CD: Opera Rara; Cat: ORC20 |
| 2005 | María Bayo, Daniela Barcellona, Francesco Meli, Carlo Lepore | Renato Palumbo, Orquesta Sinfónica de Galicia and the Prague Chamber Choir (Audio recording of a performance at the Rossini Opera Festival, August) (Video/audio 2 DVD set of an identical performance with subtitles in Italian, English, French, German, Spanish, Chinese, or none) | Audio CD: Dynamic; CDS 501/1-3 DVD: Dynamic; 1236/1-2 all regions, High Definition |
| 2017 | Cinzia Forte, Victoria Yarovaya, Kenneth Tarver, Baurzhan Anderzhanov | Antonino Fogliani, Virtuosi Brunensis, Camerata Bach Choir, Recorded live at the Rossini in Wildbad Festival | CD:Naxos Records; Cat:8660407-09 |
