= Tullio Bassi =

Italian violin maker

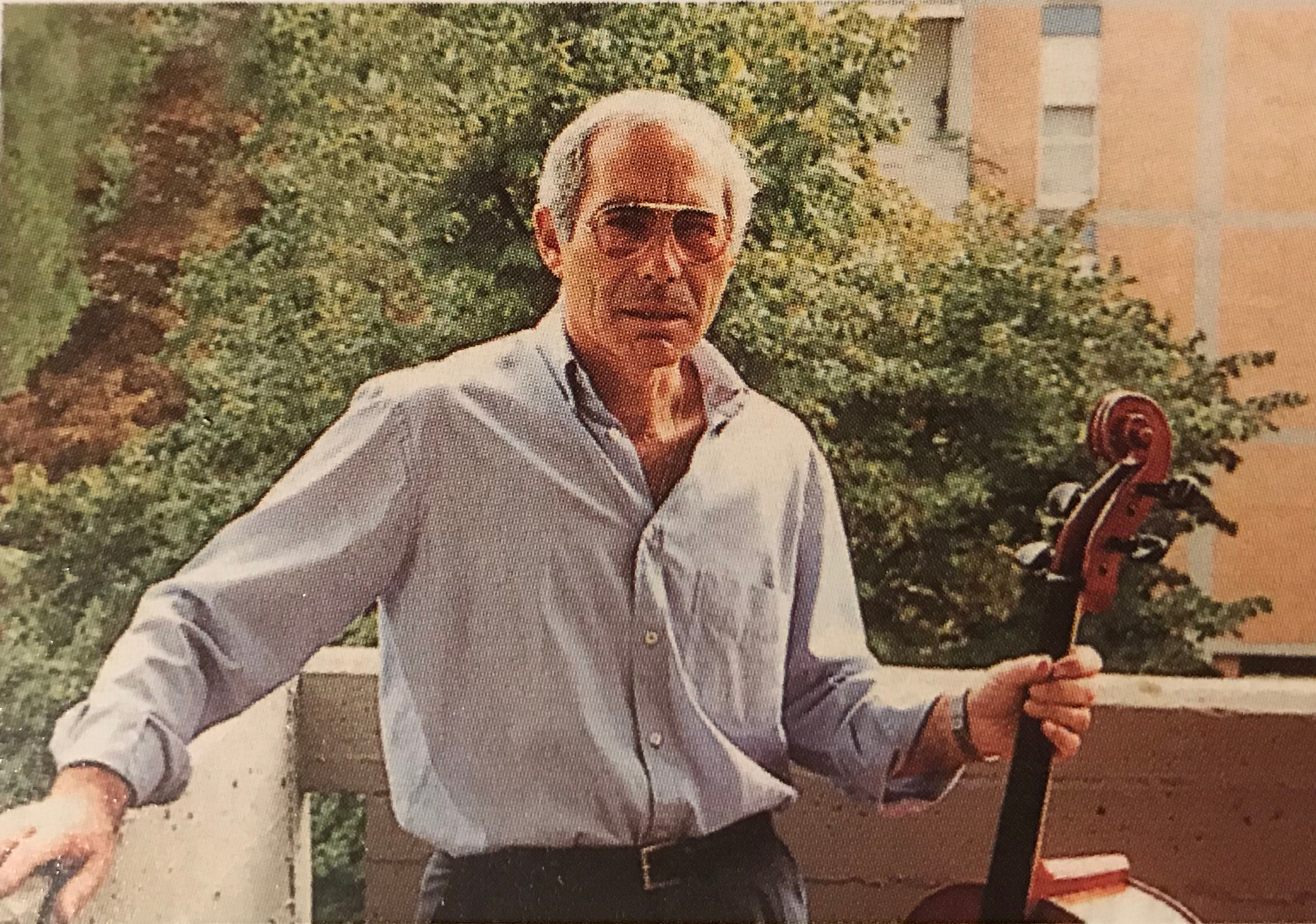
- Born: 1937 (age 88–89); Ravenna, Italy
- Occupation: Luthier
- Website: tulliobassi.com

Tullio Bassi (born 1937 in Ravenna, Romagna) is an Italian violin maker. He made instruments for members of a number of renowned orchestras. He studies and follows the techniques of the renowned luthier, Antonio Stradivari.

He is a self-taught violin maker, coming from a family of cabinet-makers, who developed a passion for classical musical instruments and experimenting in the fabrication of string instruments, progressively becoming a luthier.

== Career ==
In the late 60's, he made his first classical guitar, participating in a local contest in Bagnacavallo where he ranked third.

In the 1970s, he began constructing violins and other instruments.

In the last five decades, he has made guitars, violins, violas and cellos, with the methods of old luthiers as described in The secrets of Stradivari.

He maintained and followed ancient techniques, with a no-compromise approach in the respect of timing schedules for each phase of the manufacturing process and following the original execution methods. He used the same elements and materials as the ancient Italian luthiers.

His target is to preserve the integrity of the old Italian art and culture in violin making and maintenance and share this knowledge with younger generations. A public exhibition of his instruments was held in 2012 in the main square of the city of Ravenna by La Cassa Bank Foundation.

== Legacy ==
His instruments are played by artists including:

- Francesco Manara, 1st violin of the La Scala Orchestra in Milan
- Danilo Rossi 1st viola of the La Scala Orchestra of Milan
- Stefano Pezzi, cello of the RAI orchestra
- Claudia Zanzotto, violin
- Paolo Chiavacci, violin
- Roberto Noferini, violin

Since 2003, with the support of the "Associazione Musicale Angelo Mariani", he organises an annual concert in a church in Piangipane, called "Omaggio a Paganini" in memory of the concert that Niccolò Paganini held in Romagna in 1810.

In 2008 he made Tromba marina, a triangular bowed string instrument used in medieval and Renaissance Europe.

He is named in Violin makers in Italy, by Gualtiero Nicolini.
