= Shaul Bassi =

Italian academic

Shaul Bassi is professor of English and postcolonial literature at the Ca' Foscari University of Venice, Italy. He is the director of the Venice Center for Humanities and Social Change. His work has focused on Shakespeare and post-colonial theory. Bassi has also written about the present environmental and social issues of Venice, as well as the city's history.

== Books ==
- Shakespeare’s Italy and Italy’s Shakespeare. Place, "Race," Politics, Reproducing Shakespeare: New Studies in Adaptation and Appropriation, Palgrave Macmillan, 2016.
- The Ghetto Inside Out, with Isabella Di Lenardo, Corte del Fondego, 2013
- Visions of Venice in Shakespeare, edited with Laura Tosi, Ashgate, 2011, reprinted by Routledge, 2016.
- Essere qualcun altro. Ebrei postmoderni e postcoloniali, Cafoscarina, 2011.
- Le metamorfosi di Otello, Storia di un'etnicità immaginaria, Graphis, 2000.
