= Giancarlo Bassi =

Italian ice hockey player (1926–2019)

Personal information
- Nationality: Italian
- Born: 23 February 1926; Felino, Italy
- Died: 17 May 2019 (aged 93); Milan, Italy

Sport
- Sport: Ice hockey

Giancarlo Bassi (23 February 1926 – 17 May 2019) was an Italian ice hockey player. He competed in the men's tournament at the 1948 Winter Olympics.
