= Semiramide riconosciuta (Meyerbeer) =

1819 opera by Giacomo Meyerbeer

- Opera by Giacomo Meyerbeer
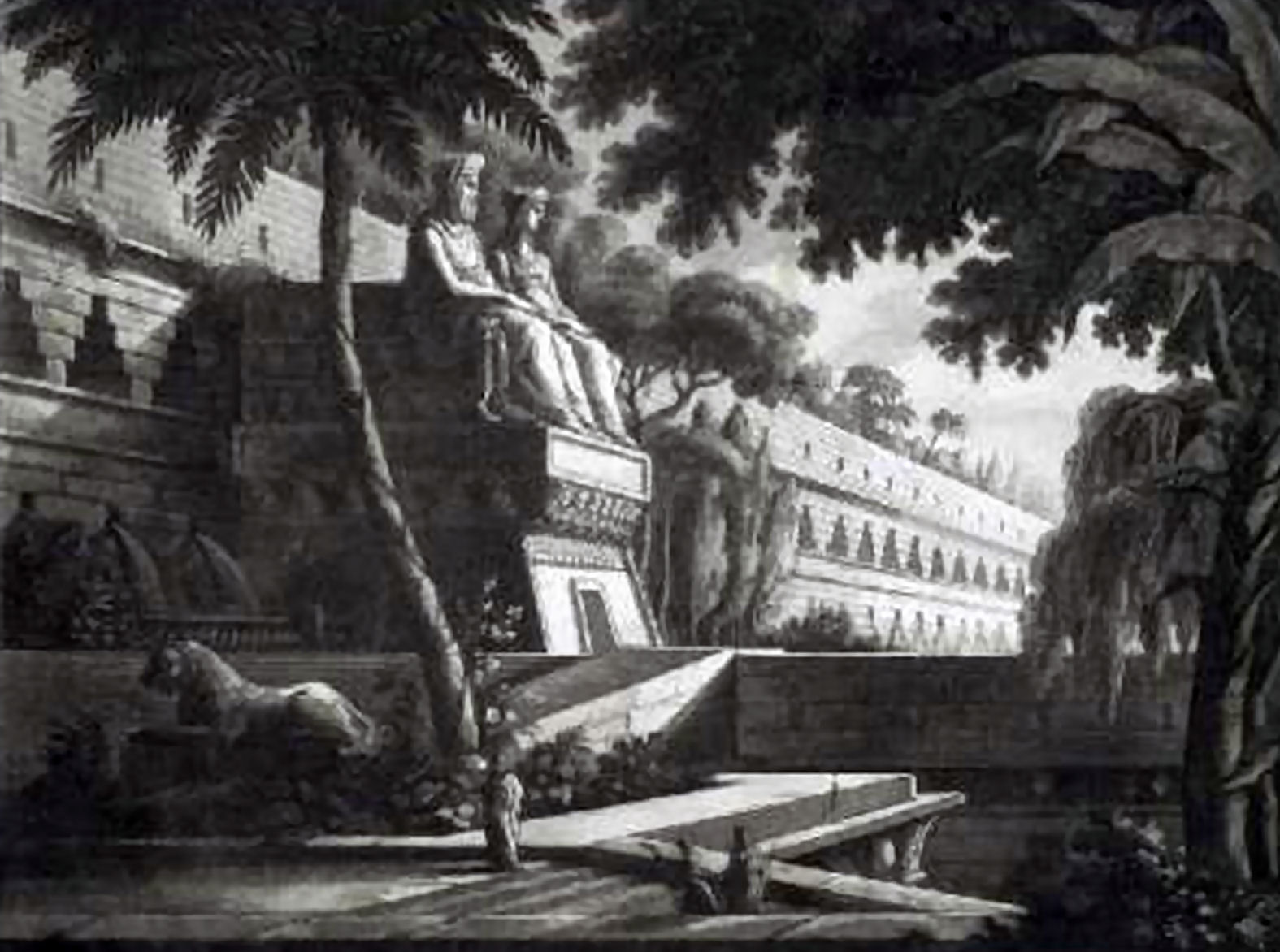
- Set design for the Hanging Gardens of Babylon in a 1820 Bologna production
- Librettist: Pietro Metastasio
- Language: Italian
- Premiere: 3 February 1819; Teatro Regio Turin

Semiramide riconosciuta (Semiramis recognised) is a dramma per musica in two acts by Giacomo Meyerbeer. It is the composer's fifth opera and the second that he composed for a theatre in Italy. The text is an adaptation of a pre-existing libretto by Pietro Metastasio that had already been set to music by numerous other composers. The opera had its premiere at the Teatro Regio in Turin on 3 February 1819.

== Background ==
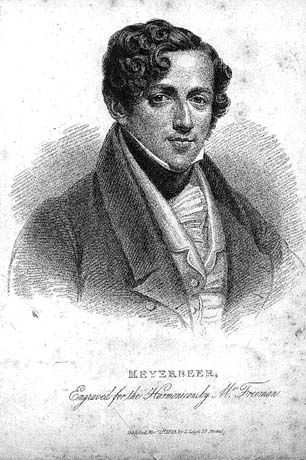
Giacomo Meyerbeer, c. 1825

Born in Berlin to a wealthy family, as a young man, Giacomo Meyerbeer had musical ambitions; he studied and traveled in Italy. Much impressed and influenced by the leading Italian composer of operas of the day, Rossini, Meyerbeer composed an opera in the style of that composer, Romilda e Costanza, which was produced in Padua in 1817. Through the support of a star singer of the day, Carolina Bassi, Meyerbeer had the opportunity to compose an opera for Turin, and the already ninety year old libretto Semiramide riconosciuta (presented in Turin simply as Semiramide) by Pietro Metasasio was chosen for the occasion.

The libretti of Metastasio followed the form of opera seria, with passages of secco recitative followed by solo arias for the singers and contain little or no ensembles (duets, trios, etc.) or choruses. The 1729 libretto for Semiramide riconosciuta by Metastasio had some thirty arias, and had already been set to music by numerous composers including Gluck, Salieri, Porpora, and others. Josef Mysliveček's version, titled simply Semiramide, was performed in 1766. By 1819, musical and theatrical taste had changed and audiences wanted more from opera than one solo aria after the other, so the libretto was adapted by Lodovico Piossasco Feys to include duets and ensembles, a lengthy finale to the first act with ensembles and chorus, as demanded by the taste of the time, and the many passages of dialogue in recitative were shortened. Although a success at its first performance in Turin, the opera was only given there three times. In 1820 the libretto was further revised by Gaetano Rossi, with musical revisions by the composer, and was given under the title Semiramide riconosciuta in Bologna, with the same star, Carolina Bassi, in the title role, with great success. The story of this opera is not the same as the story of Rossini's 1823 opera Semiramide with a libretto by Rossi based on a play by Voltaire, but shows the Babylonian queen (known in English as 'Semiramis') at an early part of her life, rather than at the end of it, as in the Rossini opera. Neither storyline is based on historical fact.

== Roles ==
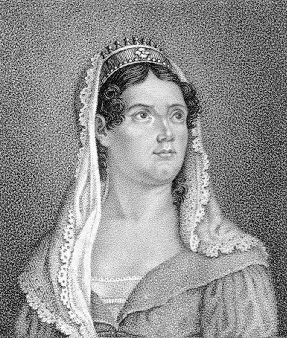
Carolina Bassi, who created the role of Semiramide

Roles, voice types, and premiere cast
Role	Voice type	Premiere cast, 3 February 1819
Semiramide, a Babylonian princess	alto	Carolina Bassi
Ircano, a Scythian prince	tenor	Claudio Bonoldi
Scitalce, an Indian prince, former lover of Semiramide	mezzo-soprano	Adelaide Dalman-Naldi
Mirteo, brother of Semiramide	bass	Raimondo Onesti
Tamiri, princess of Bactria	soprano	Teresa Cantarelli
Sibari, also formerly in love with Semiramide	tenor	Ludovico Bonoldi

== Synopsis ==
In disguise as a man, the Babylonian princess Semiramide rules Assyria. When Princess Tamiri is faced with a choice of husband from three candidates, this sets off a chain of events that eventually leads to Semiramide being reunited with her lover Scitalce, and his rival Sibari being exposed as a villain.

=== Act 1 ===
Princes and ambitious suitors have gathered in Babylon from far and wide for on this day the Princess Tamiri is to choose a husband. Among those present is Semiramide, who rules Assyria in disguise as her own son. When Semiramide's husband the King died, rather than allow her weak son Nino to assume the throne, she kept him hidden in the palace and assumed his identity. Among the suitors for Tamiri's hand is Semiramide's brother Mirteo and a previous lover of Semiramide's, Scitalce. Years before, Scitalce, deceived by Sibari, had believed Semiramide unfaithful to him and had her thrown into the river. However, unknown to Scitalce, Semiramide survived. Sibari is also present as a suitor for Tamiri and recognises Semiramide, despite her disguise.

=== Act 2 ===
Tamiri is inclined to choose Scitalce as her husband, but Semiramide still loves him despite his earlier attempt to have her killed. She reveals her identity, explaining she assumed her disguise for the good of the country, rather than allow her inept son to rule. Semiramide pardons Scitalce and denounces Sibari's villainy. Semiramide will marry Scitalce and Tamiri will wed Semiramide's brother Mirteo.

== Reception and performance history ==
The first performance, under the title Semiramide, was attended by the King and Queen of Piedmont-Sardinia, who bestowed tokens of their enjoyment. A review appeared a few days after the premiere in the Gazette of Milan, which praised the singers and especially Carolina Bassi, both for her vocal art and her acting. The review also stated that Meyerbeer's work was one of the finest examples of Italian music "even though the composer is not himself Italian." The opera received two more performances in Turin and was subsequently revised both in text and music and presented in 1820 in Bologna under the name Semiramide riconosciuta (as opposed to the original Semiramide) when both the work and the same leading lady again received an enthusiastic reception. Performances at the Rossini in Wildbad festival in Germany, in 2005, were apparently the first since Meyerbeer's own lifetime.

== Musical features ==
The singers of the leading roles were celebrated virtuoso singers of Rossini's music and the opera contains many bravura passages for them. Unusually both the title role and her love interest, Scitalce, are written for low female voices and both are "trousers" parts (the role of Scitalce is for a woman playing a man and Semiramide is disguised as a man until near the end of the piece). The chorus is for male voices only, as was the custom in many Italian opera houses at that time. The rondo for the title role, a theme with variations and interjections from the chorus, at the end of the first act, became the most famous piece in the opera. It features extensive writing for the harp in combination with the singer's voice, only a few years after the composer Simon Mayr had used a harp in an Italian opera orchestra for the first time.

== Recordings ==
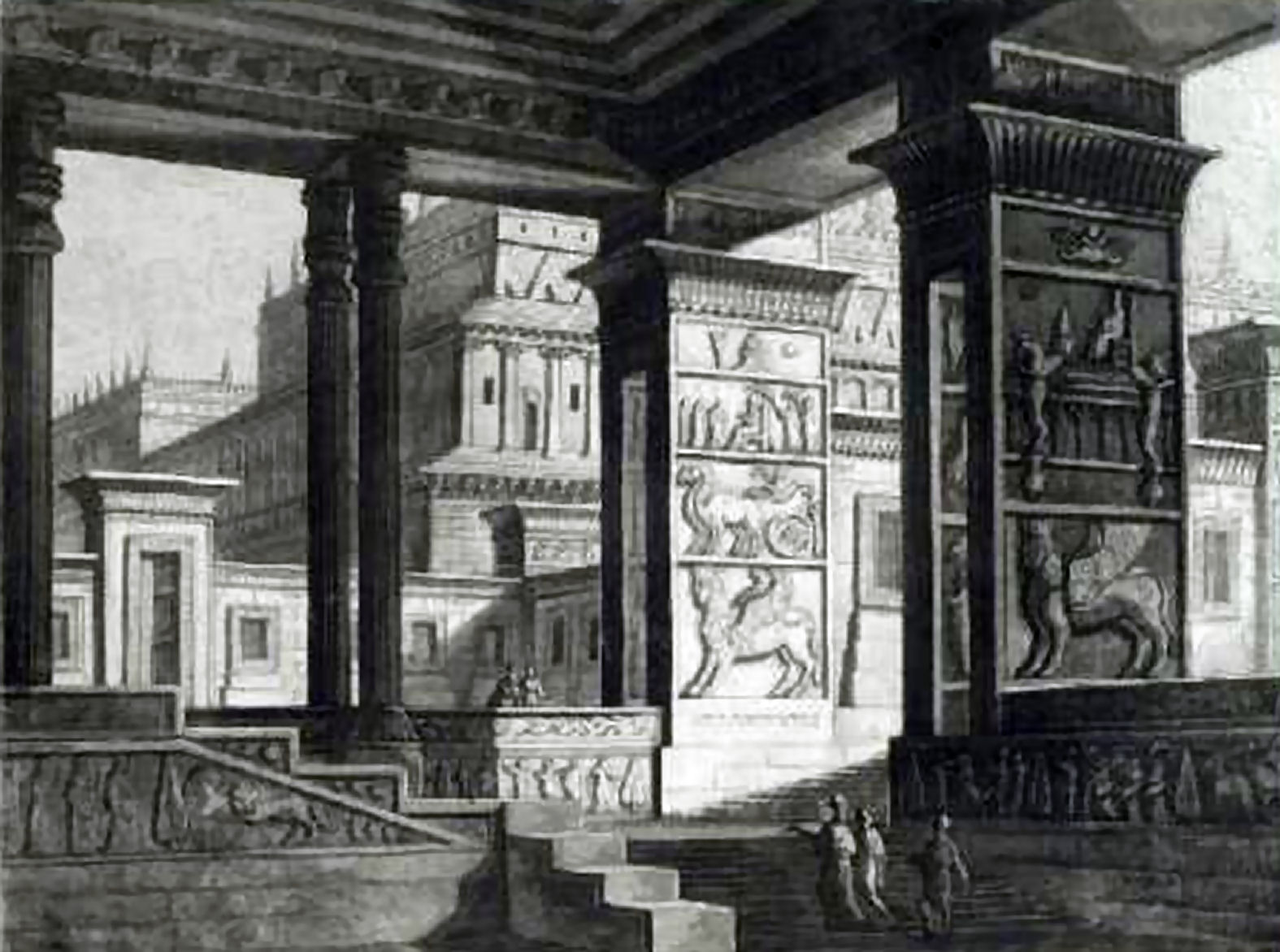
Set design for the Bologna production in 1820 of Meyerbeer's Semiramide riconosciuta

Year	Cast: Semiramide, Ircano, Scitalce, Mirteo, Tamiri, Sibari	Conductor, orchestra	Label
2005	Deborah Riedel, Filippo Adami, Fiona Janes, Wojtek Gierlach, Olga Peretyatko, Leonardo Silva	Richard Bonynge, Württemberg Philharmonic Orchestra	CD: Naxos, Cat:8.660205-06
2006	Clara Polito, Aldo Caputo, Eufemia Tufano, Federico Sacchi, Stefania Grasso, Roberto di Biasio	Rani Calderon, Orchestra Internazionale d’Italia	CD: Dynamic, Cat:533/1-2
