= Aldo Bassi =

Italian jazz trumpeter (1962–2020)

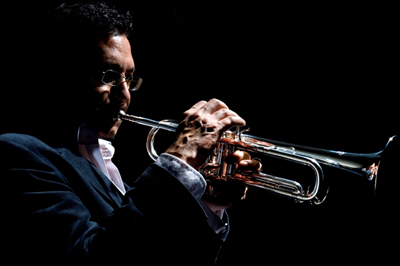

Background information
- Born: 29 January 1962; Rome, Italy
- Died: 10 May 2020 (aged 58) Latina, Italy
- Genres: Jazz
- Instrument: Trumpet

Aldo Bassi (29 January 1962 – 10 May 2020) was an Italian jazz trumpeter.

== Biography ==
After graduating in trumpet at the Santa Cecilia Conservatory in Rome Bassi joined several Roman jazz bands: the Alberto Corvini Big Band, the S. Louis Big Band directed by Bruno Biriaco and the Testaccio Jazz Orchestra. Upon returning to Italy, after a formative Cuban experience, he released Conversation with Franco Piana's Big Band and later with Riccardo Fassi's Tankio Band two albums. In 1992, with Rosario Giulian,i he formed the Bassi-Giuliani Quintet, with the 1996 album L'incontro and participation in the Jazz & Image Festival to his credit.

In 1998, he formed the first band under his own name, the Aldo Bassi Quartet, with which he released Distanze in 1999. On the following year's tour, he hosted U.S. saxophonist Rick Margitza. In 2001, he recorded the quartet's second album, Muah! released in 2004, featuring Margitza himself and Antonello Salis.

In 2004, he joined the Italian National Jazz Orchestra and the following year the Parco della Musica Jazz Orchestra (PMJO) with which he went on a world tour. In 2006, he formed the Aldo Bassi Trio with Stefano Nunzi on double bass and Alessandro Marzi without releasing anything. In 2007, he released with pianist Alessandro Bravo the album Sirio and in 2010 a new work by Quartet New Research. He later works for Rai and Mediaset. In 2013, he started the Metal Jazz Trio project together with Pierpaolo Ranieri and Roberto Pistolesi.
