= Antonio Bassi =

Italian painter

Antonio Bassi (died 1782) was an Italian painter. He was born and active in Ferrara. He painted a Repose in Egypt and a Christ and Samaritan Woman for the church of San Giovanni Battista; and painted a Virgin Mary, St. Anne, and St. Joachim for the church of San Clemente.
