= List of operas by Antonio Vivaldi =

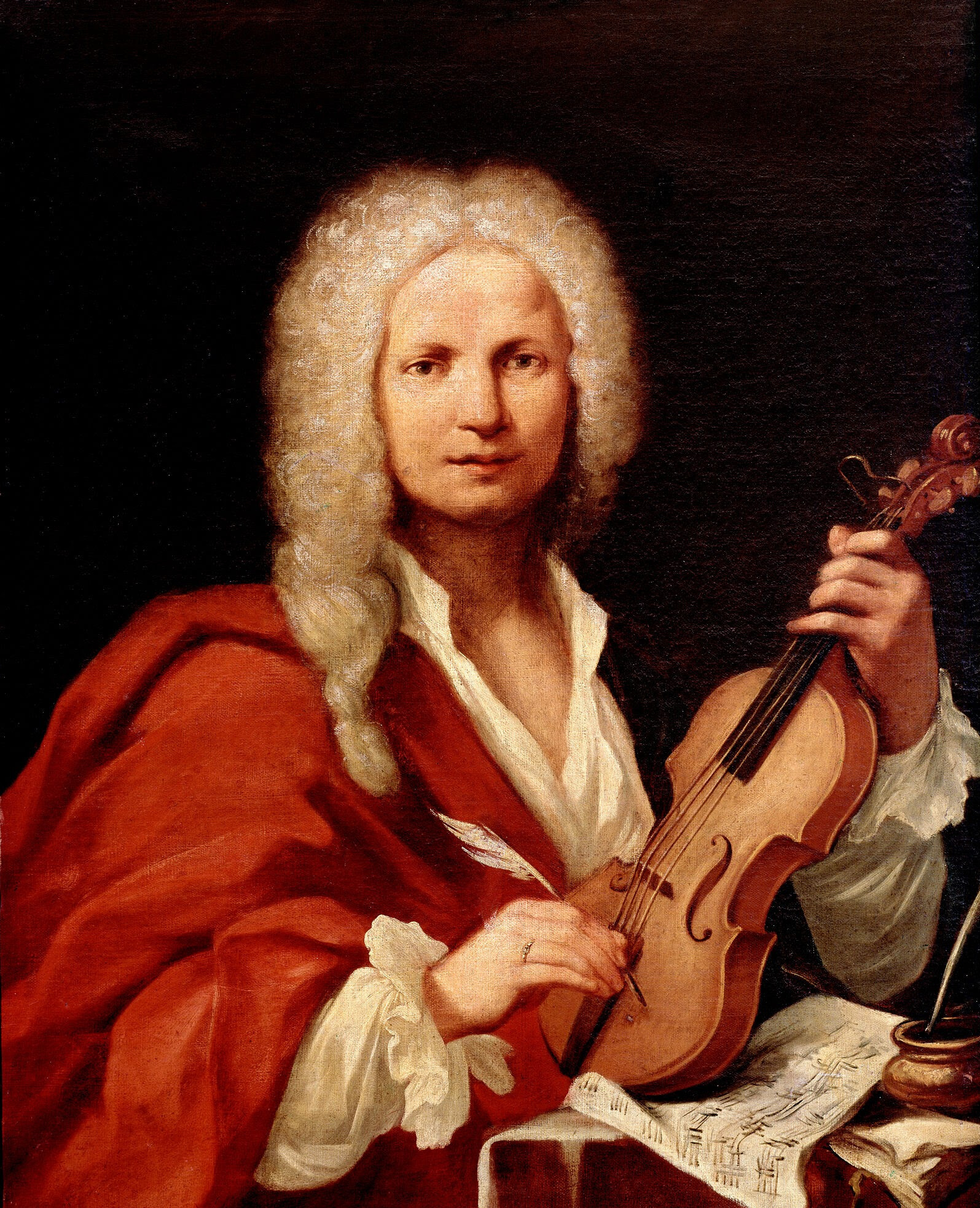
Antonio Vivaldi, c. 1723

This is a complete list of operas by Antonio Vivaldi (1678–1741). He claimed to have composed 94 operas, but fewer than 50 titles have been identified, of which the scores of only 20 or so survive, wholly or in part. Moreover, the practice of reviving works under a different title and of creating pasticci has confused musicologists.

All of Vivaldi's operatic works are described as dramma per musica, roughly equivalent to opera seria.

== List of operas ==
51 items are listed. Key: music completely lost; music preserved (at least in part)

Operas by Antonio Vivaldi
#	RV	Title	Libretto	Premiere		Notes
#	RV	Title	Libretto	Date	Venue	Notes
1	729	Ottone in villa	Domenico Lalli	17 May 1713	Vicenza, Teatro di Piazza	
2	727	Orlando finto pazzo	Grazio Braccioli	November 1714	Venice, Teatro Sant'Angelo	
3	819	Orlando furioso	Grazio Braccioli	9 November 1714	Venice, Teatro Sant'Angelo	part survives in manuscript, parts later reworked in RV 728 q.v.
4	724	Nerone fatto Cesare	Matteo Noris	Carnival 1715	Venice, Teatro Sant'Angelo	pasticcio (Francesco Gasparini, Giuseppe Maria Orlandini, Carlo Francesco Pollarolo, Vivaldi)
5	706	La costanza trionfante degl'amori e de gl'odii	Antonio Marchi	Carnival 1716	Venice, Teatro San Moisè	reworked as Artabano, re dei Parti (RV 701) in 1718, later as La tirannia castigata (RV Anh 55) in 1726 and Doriclea (RV 708) in 1732
6	700	Arsilda, regina di Ponto	Domenico Lalli	27 or 28 October 1716	Venice, Teatro Sant'Angelo	
7	719	L'incoronazione di Dario	Adriano Morselli	23 January 1717	Venice, Teatro Sant'Angelo	
8	737	Tieteberga	Antonio Maria Lucchini	16 October 1717	Venice, Teatro San Moisè	
9	Anh 58	Il vinto trionfante del vincitore	Antonio Marchi	Autumn 1717	Venice, Teatro Sant'Angelo	pasticcio, possibly with some music by Vivaldi
10	701	Artabano, re dei Parti	Antonio Marchi	Carnival 1718	Venice, Teatro San Moisè	1 aria preserved, reworking of La costanza trionfante (RV 706)
11	699	Armida al campo d'Egitto	Giovanni Palazzi	Carnival 1718	Venice, Teatro San Moisè. Further performances in Venice on 26 December 1730 and 12 February 1738.	reworked as Gl’inganni per vendetta (RV 720) in 1720
12	732	Scanderbeg	Antonio Salvi	22 June 1718	Florence, Teatro della Pergola	
13	736	Teuzzone	Apostolo Zeno	28 December 1718	Mantua, Teatro Arciducale	
14	738	Tito Manlio	Matteo Noris	Carnival 1719	Mantua, Teatro Arciducale	
15	778	Tito Manlio	Matteo Noris	Carnival 1720	Rome, Teatro della Pace	pasticcio. Act III only by Vivaldi.
16	704	La Candace, o siano Li veri amici	Francesco Silvani and Domenico Lalli	Carnival 1720	Mantua, Teatro Arciducale	
17	720	Gl’inganni per vendetta	Giovanni Palazzi or Domenico Lalli	1720	Vicenza, Teatro delle Grazie	reworking of Armida al campo d’Egitto (RV 699)
18	739	La verità in cimento	Giovanni Palazzi	26 October (?) 1720	Venice, Teatro Sant'Angelo	
19	715	Filippo re di Macedonia	Domenico Lalli	27 December 1720	Venice, Teatro Sant'Angelo	pasticcio
20	734	La Silvia	Enrico Bissari	28 August 1721	Milan, Reggio Ducale	
21	710	Ercole su'l Termodonte	Antonio Salvi	January 1723	Rome, Teatro Capranica	
22	717	Giustino	Nicolò Beregan / Pietro Pariati	Carnival 1724	Rome, Teatro Capranica	
23	740	La virtù trionfante dell’amore, e dell’odio, overo Il Tigrane	Francesco Silvani	Carnival 1724	Rome, Teatro Capranica	pasticcio (only Act II by Vivaldi)
24	721	L’inganno trionfante in amore	Matteo Noris	Autumn 1725	Venice, Teatro Sant'Angelo	
25	707	Cunegonda	Agostino Piovene	29 January 1726	Venice, Teatro Sant'Angelo	
26	712	La fede tradita e vendicata	Francesco Silvani	16 February 1726	Venice, Teatro Sant'Angelo	
27	Anh 55	La tirannia castigata	Francesco Silvani	Carnival 1726	Prague, Sporck Theater	recitatives by Antonio Guerra; arias almost entirely drawn from La costanza trionfante degl'amori e de gl'odii (RV 706)
28	709	Dorilla in Tempe	Antonio Maria Lucchini	9 November 1726	Venice, Teatro Sant'Angelo	pasticcio
29	722	Ipermestra	Antonio Salvi	25 January 1727	Florence, Teatro della Pergola	For other versions, see Ipermestra
30	711	Farnace	Antonio Maria Lucchini	10 February 1727	Venice, Teatro Sant'Angelo	
31	735	Siroe, re di Persia	Metastasio	Ascension 1727	Reggio Emilia, Teatro Pubblico	
32	728	Orlando furioso	Grazio Braccioli	Autumn 1727	Venice, Teatro Sant'Angelo	
33	730	Rosilena ed Oronta	Giovanni Palazzi	Carnival 1728	Venice, Teatro Sant'Angelo	
34	702	Atenaide	Apostolo Zeno	29 December 1728	Florence, Teatro della Pergola	
35	697	Argippo	Domenico Lalli	Autumn 1730	Prague, Sporck Theater	seven arias were rediscovered in Regensburg by Ondrej Macek
36	696	Alvilda regina de' Goti	Giulio Cesare Corradi	Spring 1731	Prague, Sporck Theater	Treatment of Alf and Alfhild; only some arias by Vivaldi, probably from other operas. Transferred to the Anhang as RV Anh. 88
37	733	Semiramide	Francesco Silvani and Domenico Lalli	Carnival 1731	Mantua, Teatro Arciducale	
38	714	La fida ninfa	Francesco Scipione	Carnival 1732	Verona, Teatro Filarmonico	
39	708	Doriclea	Antonio Marchi	1732	Prague, Sporck Theater	reworking of La costanza trionfante (RV 706)
40	723	Motezuma	Girolamo Alvise Giusti	14 November 1733	Venice, Teatro Sant'Angelo	
41	725	L'Olimpiade	Metastasio	17 February 1734	Venice, Teatro Sant'Angelo	
42	695	L’Adelaide	Antonio Salvi	Carnival 1735	Verona, Teatro Filarmonico	
43	703	Il Tamerlano (Il Bajazet)	Agostino Piovene	Carnival 1735	Verona, Teatro Filarmonico	pasticcio
44	718	Griselda	Apostolo Zeno / Carlo Goldoni	18 May 1735	Venice, Teatro San Samuele	
45	698	Aristide	Carlo Goldoni	Autumn 1735	Venice, Teatro San Samuele	Transferred to the Anhang as RV Anh. 89
46	716	Ginevra principessa di Scozia	Antonio Salvi	17 January 1736	Florence, Teatro della Pergola	
47	705	Catone in Utica	Metastasio	26 May 1737	Verona, Teatro Filarmonico	
48	726	L'oracolo in Messenia	Apostolo Zeno	30 December 1737	Venice, Teatro Sant'Angelo	
49	777	Il giorno felice	Scipione Maffei	1737	Venice	Transferred to the Anhang as RV Anh. 92
50	731	Rosmira (Rosmira fedele)	Silvio Stampiglia	27 January 1738	Venice, Teatro Sant'Angelo	pasticcio arranged by Vivaldi of music by Hasse, Pergolesi, Handel, etc.)
51	713	Feraspe	Francesco Silvani	1739	Venice, Teatro Sant'Angelo	
