= Bettina Hoffmann =

Bettina Hoffmann may refer to:

- Bettina Hoffmann (artist) (born 1964), German artist
- Bettina Hoffmann (musician) (born 1959), German musician
- Bettina Hoffmann (politician) (born 1960), German politician
