= Margherita Gualandi =

Italian singer

Margherita Gualandi, "la Campioli" (fl. 1705 – 1738), was one of the most renowned Italian soprano singers of the early 18th century, the interpreter of starring operatic roles in a large number of musical centers, both in Italy and central Europe, and a collaborator of Antonio Vivaldi. Famed for her difficult temperament, she could be considered a prototype for the type of Bolognese prima donna satirized in Benedetto Marcello’s famous pamphlet Il teatro alla moda of 1720, a critique of Italian operatic culture of his day. Alongside two other prominent Bolognese singers of this era, Maria Caterina Negri and Antonia Maria Laurenti, she was a member of the musical circle of Antonio Vivaldi in Venice. All three sang in Prague between the years 1724 and 1729, probably due to arrangements cultivated between Vivaldi and the impresario of the Sporck theater, Antonio Denzio. As was the case with Laurenti, Gualandi found a husband among the Italian singing personnel active in Prague in the 1720s.

== Early career in Italy ==
Much biographical information about Gualandi derives from her mention in the librettos printed for her operatic appearances, including the very first one, in an anonymous opera performed in Modena in 1705 with the title Il trionfo d’amore ne’ tradimenti. In the role of Placilla, she is identified as “Margherita Campioli, bolognese.” This is likely a confirmation that her maiden name was Campioli. Her birth date is unknown, but in the first operatic appearance of a long career, she could not have been younger that her late teens, thus probably born sometime in the 1680s. Nothing at all can be claimed about her training as a singer other than to observe that her upbringing in Bologna, one of the leading musical centers in Italy at the time, would have made possible excellent instruction. In the cast lists of librettos beginning with Floriano Arresti’s Crisippo, performed in Ferrara in May 1710, and ending with Giovanni Porta’s Amore e fortuna, performed in Augsburg in May 1733, variants of the designation “Margherita Gualandi, detta la Campioli” are normal. This would indicate a marriage to an individual named Gualandi, about whom nothing is known. If this person were also Bolognese, he might have been related to the Bolognese singer Diamante Maria Gualandi (fl. 1721-1740), who appeared at the Sporck theater in Prague during the operatic season 1725-26, two years before Margherita. At the beginning of her second period of activity in Prague, in an appearance in the anonymous Il più fedel fra vassalli in autumn 1733, she is designated in the cast list as “Margherita Campioli, et ora [and now] Moretti”, another sign that Campioli was her original surname. The new designation clearly indicates that she had just married the much younger Venetian singer Lorenzo Moretti, whom she met originally during the 1728–29 operatic season in Prague (and probably initiated a romantic affair at that time). Just before their last returns to Prague, they both appeared in Porta’s Amore e fortuna in Augsburg and Giuseppe Antonio Paganelli’s Narciso al fonte in Munich in August 1733. Presumably, Margherita had been a widow for a long period at the time of her marriage to Moretti.

Gualandi’s early roles between 1705 and the autumn of 1710 were generally in lesser operatic centers (Modena, Cremona, Ferrara, and Mantua) in works by composers of lesser talents. She did, however, make her first appearance in Venice, the most prestigious operatic center in the Europe at the time, in Girolamo Polani’s Arato in Sparta at the Teatro Sant’Angelo, albeit in the subsidiary role of Cleone (a “prince of Sparta”). The latter was one of the many male roles (breeches roles) in which she performed throughout her career. The earliest was the role of Endimione (Endymion), the stunningly handsome shepherd of classical mythology, in an anonymous Endimione given in Cremona in 1709 with a cast made up entirely of Bolognese singers. Also, her very last appearance, in the title role of Siroe, re di Persia, given in Ancona in 1738 with music by Antonio Vivaldi, was a breeches role. Cross dressing was common in the Venetian public theaters of the late 17th century, which may at least partially explain her role as Endymion in 1709, but in the early 18th century, it was very common in Europe to cast women in male roles in locations that did not have sufficient funds to hire the best castrato male sopranos. This was a particular problem at the less well funded opera theaters in central Europe who wanted to cast roles properly intended for male sopranos, not only from the aspect of funding, but also from the aspect of availability. Thus, Gualandi appeared in male costume frequently at the Sporck theater in Prague and also in the operas in Augsburg and Munich in 1733 that also featured her husband, the tenor Lorenzo Moretti.

== Peak of fame (1711–1726) ==
The breakthrough roles for Gualandi came in the years 1711–16 at the Teatro Sant’Angelo in Venice. Whereas as her first appearance in the carnival season of 1711 was an isolated appearance, she was engaged more frequently in the operatic seasons of 1711-16, which included productions for the autumn and carnival periods falling between two consecutive calendar years. The Sant’Angelo was closely associated with Antonio Vivaldi, a bit of an irony, considering his exalted position as a composer of instrumental music in Europe, since it was not considered the most prestigious of the Venetian opera theaters; the Teatro San Giovanni Cristosomo occupied that place instead in Vivaldi’s time. The Sant’Angelo was considered a venue for more popularized and commercialized entertainments. In the autumn season of 1714, Gualandi appeared in one of Vivaldi’s earliest operas, Orlando finto pazzo and later appeared in his Nerone fatto Cesare in the carnival season of 1715. Another important appearance was in Giovanni Alberto Ristori’s Orlando furioso, also for the carnival season of 1715. After her last appearance at the Sant’Angelo in carnival 1716, there is no record of her appearing in any operatic productions in Italy until the carnival season of 1718 in Brescia. Whatever the reason, she was without musical employment for nearly two years after she left Venice for the first time, and she never returned to the Sant’Angelo.

When Gualandi's name reappears in librettos, it is in operas from an interesting venue of great importance both to Gualandi and Vivaldi: the court of Philip of Hesse-Darmstadt (1671–1736), a prince of the House of Hesse-Darmstadt as a son of Louis VI, Landgrave of Hesse-Darmstadt, a field marshal of the Holy Roman Empire and governor of Mantua between 1714 and 1736. Vivaldi served as maestro di cappella for Philip in Mantua between 1717 and 1720. Gualandi appeared in two operas of Vivaldi that were written for the court of Mantua, both in title roles written for male characters: Teuzzone (1718) and Tito Manlio (1719). Vivaldi probably took a hand in arranging for her employment, which made it possible for her to advertise her court appointment for many years to come. Singers of this era were always anxious to draw attention to appointments in the musical establishments of royal or aristocratic patrons, and the usual form this took in her case was to have her referred to in librettos as a “virtuosa del s.a.s. [His Serene Highness] il sig. principe Filippo landgravio d’Hassia d’Armestat” or a close variant of that phrase. The first appearance of a title of this type is found in the libretto for an anonymous Vincislao performed in Livorno in 1720, and the last appearance is found in the libretto for an anonymous L’Issipile performed in Prague in 1735.

The last phase of Gualandi’s principal career in Italy included appearances in Milan in the operatic seasons of 1721–22 (which featured a performance of Vivaldi’s opera La Silvia); Turin in the carnival season of 1722; Milan in the carnival season of 1723; Pesaro in the carnival season of 1724; Genoa during the autumn season of 1724; and Florence in the carnival seasons of 1725 and 1726. The latter appearances were followed by a great crisis in her career. Although there were no great problems surrounding her appearances in Florence itself, the efforts of the impresario of the Teatro della Pergola to assist her in landing a role in a performance in Naples in May 1726 in Johann Adolf Hasse’s opera Sesostrate led to catastrophe. Gualandi’s difficult behavior was known in Naples, and it was difficult for the impresario in Florence to convince the management of the Teatro San Bartolomeo to believe that she could be relied upon to show up in time for the run of Hasse’s opera that was supposed to start on 13 May. Gualandi did arrive on time and participated in the rehearsals but was angered by a series of intrigues directed against her that led her to leave Naples unannounced under cover of darkness about a week before Hasse’s opera was to see its first performance. A last-minute arrangement to replace her in the role of Timareta had to be made. Gualandi found both detractors and advocates regarding her behavior in this matter, but for practical purposes, it soon made her impossible to cast in an Italian operatic production for the remainder of her most productive years as a singer. She was able to appear in a performance of Nicola Porpora’s opera Imeneo in Atene in September 1726 at the Teatro San Samuele in Venice, but otherwise, she was unable to arrange for another role in Italy until she was cast in Vivaldi’s Siroe, re di Persia in Ancona in the summer of 1738, when she must have been past fifty years of age. Forced to leave Italy in search of operatic roles, she found work north of the Alps during the intervening period of twelve years.

== Later career (1728–1738) ==
No operatic roles for Gualandi are recorded anywhere in Europe in the year 1727, but in the autumn of 1728 she embarked on a season of singing at the Sporck theater in Prague, where operas were given at three times of the year following the precedent of the Venetian theaters that its impresario, Antonio Denzio, was accustomed to from his own career as a singer: autumn, carnival, and spring. Denzio was in contact with Vivaldi, who visited Prague in the early 1730s, and there is a good chance that Gualandi benefited from a recommendation from him to Denzio. The opera season of 1728–29 in Prague marked the end of a heyday for the productions of the Denzio, in which it was able to attract major singing talents from Italy. A lack of interest and support from the Bohemian nobility led to a gradual decline in the quality of productions that eventually led to the collapse of the company and Denzio’s imprisonment for debt in 1734. But for one last season after his productions in Prague began in 1724, Denzio was able to experience a complete series of operatic successes - to which Gualandi’s singing must have contributed. Gualandi shared the stage in Prague at this time with the Venetian singer Lorenzo Moretti, with whom she seems to have initiated a love affair that finally led to a marriage in 1733.

Gualandi’s first period of activity in Prague in the 1728–29 was marked by an extraordinary scandal that sheds light on the practice of 18th-century singers who traveled from theater to theater with so-called "baggage” arias (i.e., “arie di baule” or “insertion arias”), favored arias that singers picked up during their singing engagements that they would try to have inserted into newer works, or else use in non-operatic performances. Gualandi’s experiences in Prague, however, document a case in which a singer actually commissioned a set of twelve arias for her private use from a composer at hand, in this case the Venetian singer and composer Matteo Lucchini, who provided a great deal of music for Denzio’s productions and shared the stage with Gualandi as a singer during the 1728–29 operatic season. Gualandi was sued by Lucchini in the summer of 1729 for non-payment in a case that was adjudicated within the Prague legal system. Gualandi claimed that no payment was ever expected. As a part of the testimony submitted by Lucchini for adjudication, affidavits were solicited from four eminent composers concerning what should have been a fair fee for Lucchini’s work: Johann David Heinichen and Jan Dismas Zelenka in Dresden and Giuseppe Porsile and Johann Joseph Fux in Vienna. All four of them sent responses supportive of Lucchini. The affidavit received from Heinichen would have been received in Prague a matter of weeks before his death on 16 July 1729. Gualandi was not present for the proceedings. She left Prague for Venice at the end of the spring season of 1729 in Prague but left funds with a Prague lawyer for legal expenses and a possible judgment against her. The testimony of the composers proved to be the decisive factor that led to a verdict in favor of the plaintiff Lucchini that was issued on 9 September 1729. Since money had been left with Gualandi’s representative in Prague to satisfy such a judgment, it seems that he would have been successful in collecting it.

The claim in a court document indicating Gualandi’s departure for Venice is corroborated by the appearance of Lorenzo Moretti in productions of the 1729–30 operatic season at the Teatro Sant’Angelo. It is also likely that they traveled together to other centers where Moretti sang in Italy during the early 1730s (Verona, Brescia, Trieste, Jesi, and Ferrara) until they are known to have been cast together in Giovanni Porta’s Amore e fortuna in Augsburg in May 1733. Now married to Moretti, Gualandi was the principal star who appeared in the final season of productions put on by Antonio Denzio in the Spork theater in Prague, those given for the season of 1733-34, once again frequently in male roles. The final collapse of the Denzio company was a very messy affair that included the temporary imprisonment of the impresario for debt. A full regular season of operatic productions was then mounted by Italian singers stranded in Prague in a ball house located in the Malá Strana district, including Gualandi and her husband. The very first of their productions, a setting of Metastasio’s libretto Alessandro nell’Indie, was performed with music of Matteo Lucchini, who had just returned to Prague after singing mainly in Wrocław since the end of the 1729–30 operatic season in Prague. No information exists concerning relations between Lucchini and the Morettis after the passage of five years since they were adversaries in the dispute over "baggage" aria.

The Moretti couple remained in central Europe for about three years after the performance of the last of the operas given in the Malá Strana ball house (in spring of 1735). Lorenzo next appeared in two operas in Brno in 1736, then three operas in Klagenfurt for the carnival season of 1738. Later in that year, the couple returned to Italy, appearing in Vivaldi’s Siroe in Ancona during the summer of 1738. This seems to be the last favor that Vivaldi might have arranged for Margherita. No information is presently available concerning the date or place of her death, but it is known that her husband appeared in two operas in the Teatro Sant’Angelo in Venice in the 1738–39 operatic season and three operas during the carnival season in Bergamo in 1740 (the last recorded roles of his own career). One of operas performed in Bergamo was La caduta di Bajazetto with music by none other than Matteo Lucchini, a revival of an opera performed in the Sporck theater in spring 1728 with a libretto written by its impresario Antonio Denzio. The latter appeared in the original production as the singer for the title role, just as he did in the Bergamo version. Moretti sang the role of Tamerlano, which was sung originally by Lucchini.

== Operatic roles ==
- Placilla in the anonymous Il trionfo d’amore ne’ tradimenti (Modena, 1705)
- Endimione in the anonymous L’Endimione (Cremona, 1709)
- Cleona in Arato in Sparta by Girolamo Polani (Venice, 1710)
- Sveno in Crisippo by Floriano Arresti (Ferrara, 1710)
- Arsace in La Partenope by Luca Antonio Predieri (Bologna, 1710)
- Armida in Armida al campo by Giuseppe Boniventi (Mantua, 1711)
- Linceste in Arrenione by Giovanni Maria Ruggieri (Mantua, 1711)
- Armida in Armida in Damasco by Giacomo Rampini (Venice, 1711)
- Irene in La costanza in cimento con la crudeltà by Floriano Arresti (Venice, 1711)
- Arsinoe in Arsinoe vendicata by Giovanni Maria Ruggieri (Venice, 1712)
- Belisa (?) in Rodomonte sdegnato by Michelangelo Gasparini (Venice, 1714)
- Ersilla in Orlando finto pazzo by Antonio Vivaldi (Venice, 1714)
- Angelica in Orlando furioso by Giovanni Alberto Ristori (Venice, 1714)
- Emilia in Lucio Papirio by Luca Antonio Predieri (Venice, 1715)
- Agrippina in Nerone fatto Cesare by Antonio Vivaldi (Venice, 1715)
- Statira in Alessandro fra le amazzoni by Fortunato Chelleri (Venice, 1715)
- Meroe in L’amor di figlio non conosciuto by Tomaso Albinoni (Venice, 1716)
- Ianisbe in Il più fedel fra I vassalli by Francesco Gasparini (Venice, 1716)
- Aquilio in Arrenione by Giovanni Maria Ruggeri (Brescia, 1718)
- Teuzzone in Teuzzone by Antonio Vivaldi (Mantua, 1718)
- Manlio in Tito Manlio by Antonio Vivaldi (Mantua, 1719)
- Giulia Mammea in the anonymous Alessandro Severo (Livorno, 1720)
- Lucinda in the anonymous Vincislao (Livorno, 1720)
- Silvia in La Silvia Antonio Vivaldi (Milan, 1721)
- Placidia in Flavio Anicio Olibrio by Francesco Gasparini (Milan, 1722)
- Semiramide in Semiramide by Giuseppe Maria Orlandini (Turin, 1722)
- Placidia in Il Ricimero by Francesco Gasparini (Turin, 1722)
- Ginevra in Ariodante by Andrea Stefano Fiorè (Milan, 1723)
- Giulia Mammea in Alessandro Severo by Giuseppe Maria Orlandini (Milan, 1723)
- Zoe in Il commando non inteso ed ubbidito by Francesco Gasparini (Pesaro, 1724)
- Lucinda in Il fratricida innoncente by Giovanni Porta (Pesaro, 1724)
- Linceste in Arrenione by Giovanni Maria Ruggieri (Genoa, 1724)
- Placidia in Ricimero by Pietro Vincenzo Chiocchetti (Genoa, 1724)
- Didone in the anonymous Didone abbandonata (Florence, 1725)
- Papiria in the anonymous Lucio Papirio (Florence, 1725)
- Tamiri in the anonymous Farnace (Florence, 1725)
- Zoe in the anonymous La forza del sangue (Florence, 1726)
- Timareta in Il Sesostrate by Johann Adolf Hasse (Naples, 1726)
- Rosmene in Imeneo in Atene by Nicola Porpora (Venice, 1726)
- Elisa in Astarto by Tomaso Albinoni (Prague, 1728)
- Barsina in La costanza combattuta in amore by Giovanni Porta (Prague, 1728)
- Viriate in Siface by Nicola Porpora (Prague, 1729)
- Diana in Amore trionfante by Matteo Lucchini (Prague, 1729)
- Erifille in Publio Cornelio Scipione by Carlo Francesco Pollarolo (Prague, 1729)
- Ismero in Amore e fortuna by Giovanni Porta (Augsburg, 1733)
- Narciso in Narciso al fonte by Giuseppe Antonio Paganelli (Munich, 1733)
- Antioco in the anonymous Il più fedel fra vassalli (Prague, 1733)
- Ermelinda in the anonymous Ermelinda (Prague, 1734)
- Emira in Siroe, re di Persia by Leonardo Vinci (Prague, 1734)
- Eleazarre in the anonymous Santa Maria Egizziaca (Prague, 1734)
- Teuzzone in Teuzzone by Giuseppe Maria Orlandini (Prague, 1734)
- Primislao in the anonymous Praga nascente da Libussa e Primislao (Prague, 1734)
- Cleofide in Alessandro nell’Indie by Matteo Luchini (Prague, 1734)
- Arnea in the pasticcio Fortuna ed amore (Prague, 1735)
- Alidea in Nel perdono la vendetta by Giovanni Porta (Prague, 1735)
- Aristea in the anonymous Olimpiade (Prague, 1735)
- Osmene in Antigona in Tebe by Giuseppe Maria Orlandini (Brno, 1736)
- Siroe in Siroe, re di Persia by Antonio Vivaldi (Ancona, 1738)

== Bibliography ==
- Freeman, Daniel E. The Opera Theater of Count Franz Anton von Sporck in Prague. Stuyvesant, N.Y., Pendragon Press, 1992. ISBN 0-945193-17-3
- Holmes, William C. Opera Observed: Views of a Florentine Impresario in the Early Eighteenth Century. Chicago and London: University of Chicago Press, 1993. ISBN 0-226-34970-5
- Roseman, Ulysses. “Antonio Vivaldi’s ‘Orlando finto pazzo’: an Analysis and Critical Edition”. Thesis, University of California – Los Angeles, 1989.
