= Modo Antiquo =

- Early music and Baroque ensemble
- Founded: 1984
- Location: Florence, Italy
- Principal conductor: Federico Maria Sardelli
- Website: modoantiquo.com

Modo Antiquo is an Italian instrumental ensemble dedicated to the performance of Baroque, Renaissance, and Medieval music. It was founded in 1984 by Federico Maria Sardelli. Twice nominated for a Grammy Award, the ensemble has an extensive discography, primarily on the Naïve, Brilliant Classics, and Tactus labels and has given the first performances in modern times of several works by Vivaldi. Modo Antiquo's larger ensemble is its Baroque orchestra led by Sardelli. It also has a smaller ensemble devoted to Medieval and Renaissance music led by Bettina Hoffmann.

== History and repertoire ==
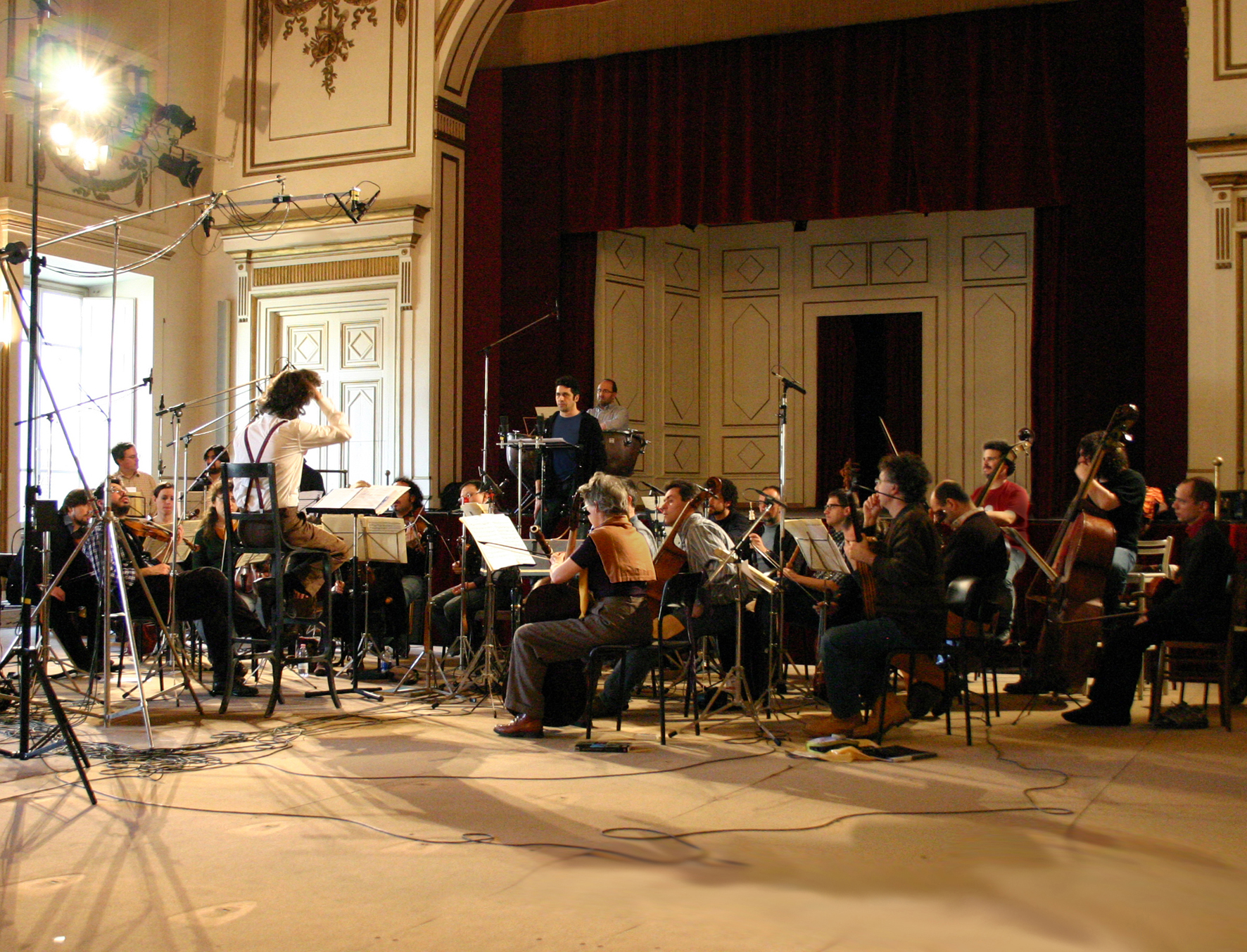
The Baroque orchestra of Modo Antiquo in a 2009 recording session

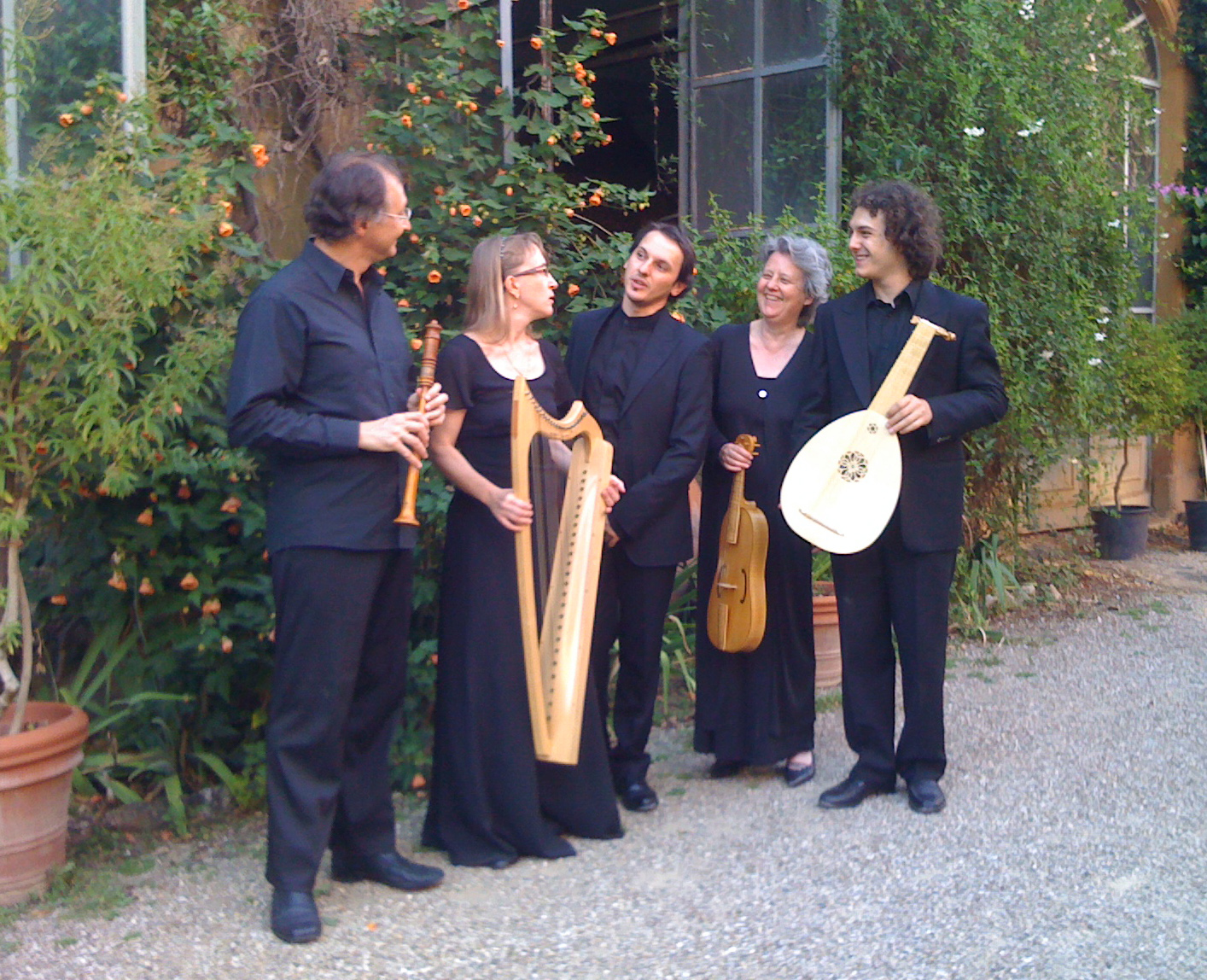
Members of the Medieval ensemble of Modo Antiquo in 2011. Second from right is their leader, Bettina Hoffmann

Modo Antiquo was founded in 1984 by the musicologist and flautist Federico Maria Sardelli and initially focused on Medieval and Renaissance music. The Baroque orchestra began in 1987, the 300th anniversary of Jean-Baptiste Lully's death, when Sardelli organised a concert in Livorno which gave the first Italian performance in modern times of Lully's Ballet des Saisons. The 25-piece orchestra played on a boat as it sailed around the city's canals. Since that time the orchestra has concentrated on the live performance and recording of music by Baroque composers, and particularly that of Vivaldi.

They received two Grammy nominations, the first in 1996 for Vivaldi's Concerti Per Molti Istromenti and the second in 1999 for Corelli's Twelve concerti grossi, Op. 6, both on the Tactus label. The orchestra later made multiple recordings for the Vivaldi Edition, a project by Naïve Records to record the entire collection of Vivaldi autograph scores preserved in the Biblioteca Nazionale in Turin. Modo Antiquo's recordings in this series include Arie d'Opera, previously unrecorded arias from Vivaldi's personal collection (2005); Violin concertos, Vol. II, six concertos for virtuoso violin collectively known as "di sfida" (2007); the opera Atenaide (2007); New Discoveries, Vols. I and II, recently authenticated pieces from the Turin collection (2009, 2012); and the opera Orlando furioso (2012).

The Medieval ensemble of Modo Antiquo consists of 4 to 5 players, some of whom also play in the Baroque orchestra. It is led by Sardelli's wife, the musicologist and viola da gambist Bettina Hoffmann. They have a number of recordings on the Brilliant Classics label and also perform in concert using modern copies of Medieval and Renaissance instruments. In 2011, they toured Italy with their performance of songs set to Confessio Goliae by the unidentified Goliard known only as Archipoeta. Only the texts were thought to have survived, but Hoffmann and scholars at the University of Cologne were able to trace and reconstruct the original musical notation.

== Modern day and world premieres ==
- Vivaldi's opera Arsilda, regina di Ponto, first performed in Venice in 1716. It received its first performance in modern times in 2001 at the Opera Barga Festival with Modo Antiquo conducted by Federico Maria Sardelli.
- Vivaldi's opera Tito Manlio, first performed in Mantua in 1719. In 2003, it was given the first performance in modern times using the critical edition of the score by Alessandro Borin. The performances took place at the Opera Barga Festival with Modo Antiquo conducted by Sardelli.
- Vivaldi's opera Motezuma, first performed in Venice in 1733. The score, which was thought to be lost, was discovered in 2002, and in 2005 the opera was given its first performances in modern times by Modo Antiquo conducted by Sardelli. The first performance was in concert version in June 2005 at the De Doelen hall in Rotterdam. In September 2005, the fully staged version was given in Düsseldorf.
- Vivaldi's opera L'Atenaide, first performed in Florence in 1728. It was given its first performance in modern times in May 2006 at the Teatro della Pergola (the site of its original premiere). It was presented during the Maggio Musicale Fiorentino with Modo Antiquo conducted by Sardelli and performed again in August at the Opera Barga Festival.
- The 1714 version of Vivaldi's opera Orlando furioso, first performed in Venice in 1714 and recomposed by Vivaldi to the same libretto in 1727. The score was thought to have been lost until it was discovered in Turin. It was given its first staged performance in modern times at the Festival de Beaune in July 2012 with Modo Antiquo conducted by Sardelli.
- Trio Sonata in G major RV 820, the earliest known work by Vivaldi. It received its world premiere in 2015 at the Uffizi in Florence, along with two other previously unperformed early works by Vivaldi. All three were played by Modo Antiquo conducted by Sardelli.
- Intermedi for La pellegrina, six operatic interludes composed by Cristofano Malvezzi, Luca Marenzio, Giulio Caccini, Giovanni de' Bardi, Jacopo Peri and Emilio de' Cavalieri, performed in Florence in 1589 to celebrate the marriage of Ferdinand I de' Medici and Christina of Lorraine. The first Italian performance in modern times was staged in 2019 during the Maggio Musicale Fiorentino with Modo Antiquo conducted by Sardelli.
