= Passecerf =

Fictional warhorse

Passecerf, or Passëcerf, ("stag-beater") is the warhorse of Gerier, one of the Twelve Peers in the French epic, The Song of Roland. Passecerf is mentioned in laisse 108 of the poem.
