= Tactus =

Tactus may refer to:

- Pulse (music)
- Tactus Records, an Italian classical music label

== See also ==
- Tactusa, genus of moths
