= Federico Maria Sardelli =

Italian composer

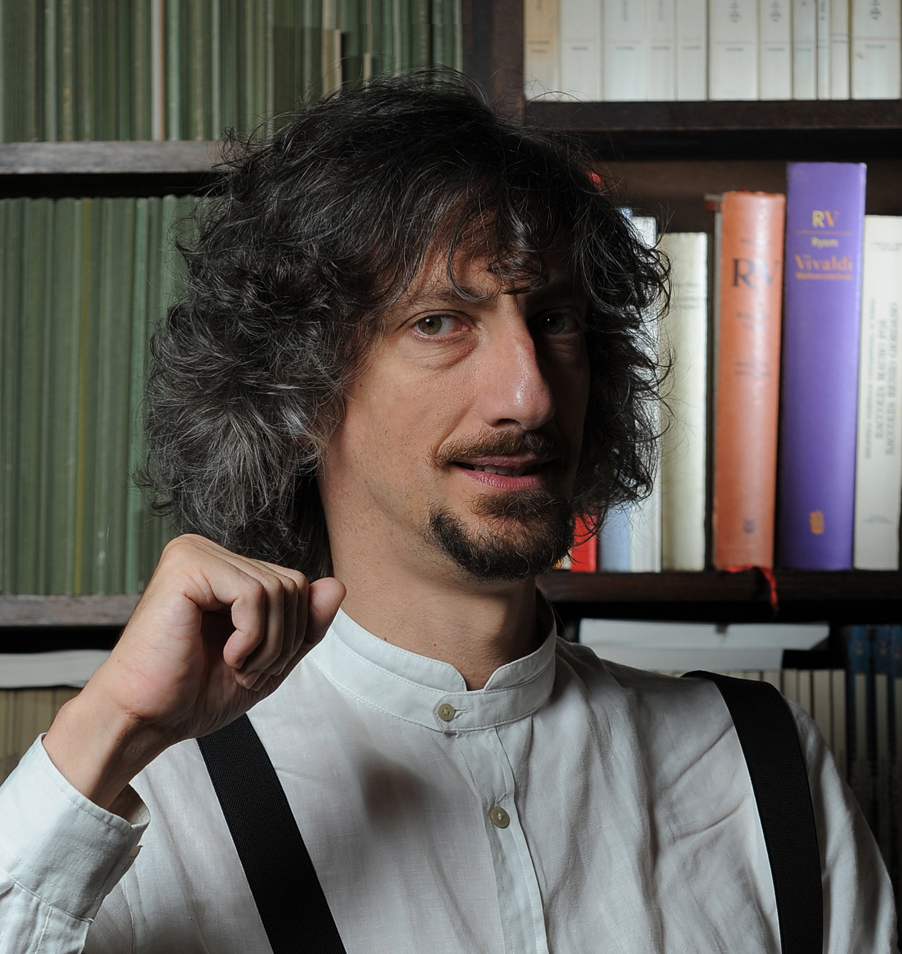
Self-portrait photograph

Federico Maria Sardelli (born 1963 in Livorno) is an Italian conductor, historicist-composer, musicologist, comic artist, and flautist, resident in Florence. He founded the medieval ensemble Modo Antiquo in 1984. In 1987, Modo Antiquo also became a baroque orchestra, debuting with the performance of Jean-Baptiste Lully's Ballet des Saisons in front of an audience of about five thousand.

== Life and career ==
He is the main conductor of the Accademia Barocca di S. Cecilia (Rome) and guest conductor of the Orchestra Filarmonica di Torino, Maggio Musicale Fiorentino, Orquestra de la Comunitat Valenciana, Gewandhaus Leipzig, Staatskapelle Halle, Kammerakademie Potsdam, Moscow State Chamber Orchestra, etc.

He has recorded more than forty Albums as soloist and conductor, published by the labels Naïve, Deutsche Grammophon, Sony, Brilliant, Tactus. A notable protagonist in the Vivaldi renaissance, he performed, recorded and edited a large number of Vivaldi compositions, often in world premiere (Arsilda, regina di Ponto, Orlando Furioso, Tito Manlio, Motezuma, L'Atenaide, etc.). He has been nominated twice for the Grammy Award (1997 and 2000) and on 28 November 2009 the Government of Tuscany awarded Sardelli with the Gonfalone d'Argento, the highest medal of honour of the Regione Toscana.

He is a member of the Scientific Board of the Istituto Italiano Antonio Vivaldi, at the Fondazione Giorgio Cini in Venice, for which he has published several essays and monographs, among them "Vivaldi's Music for Flute and Recorder", Ashgate Publishing, 2007, in the translation of Michael Talbot.

In July 2007 Peter Ryom appointed him as his heir to continue his monumental work of cataloging the music of Antonio Vivaldi, and since then Federico Maria has been responsible for the Ryom-Verzeichnis (RV). In December 2014 he and Francisco Javier Lupiáñez Ruiz independently identified the earliest known work of Vivaldi, which he has catalogued as RV 820.

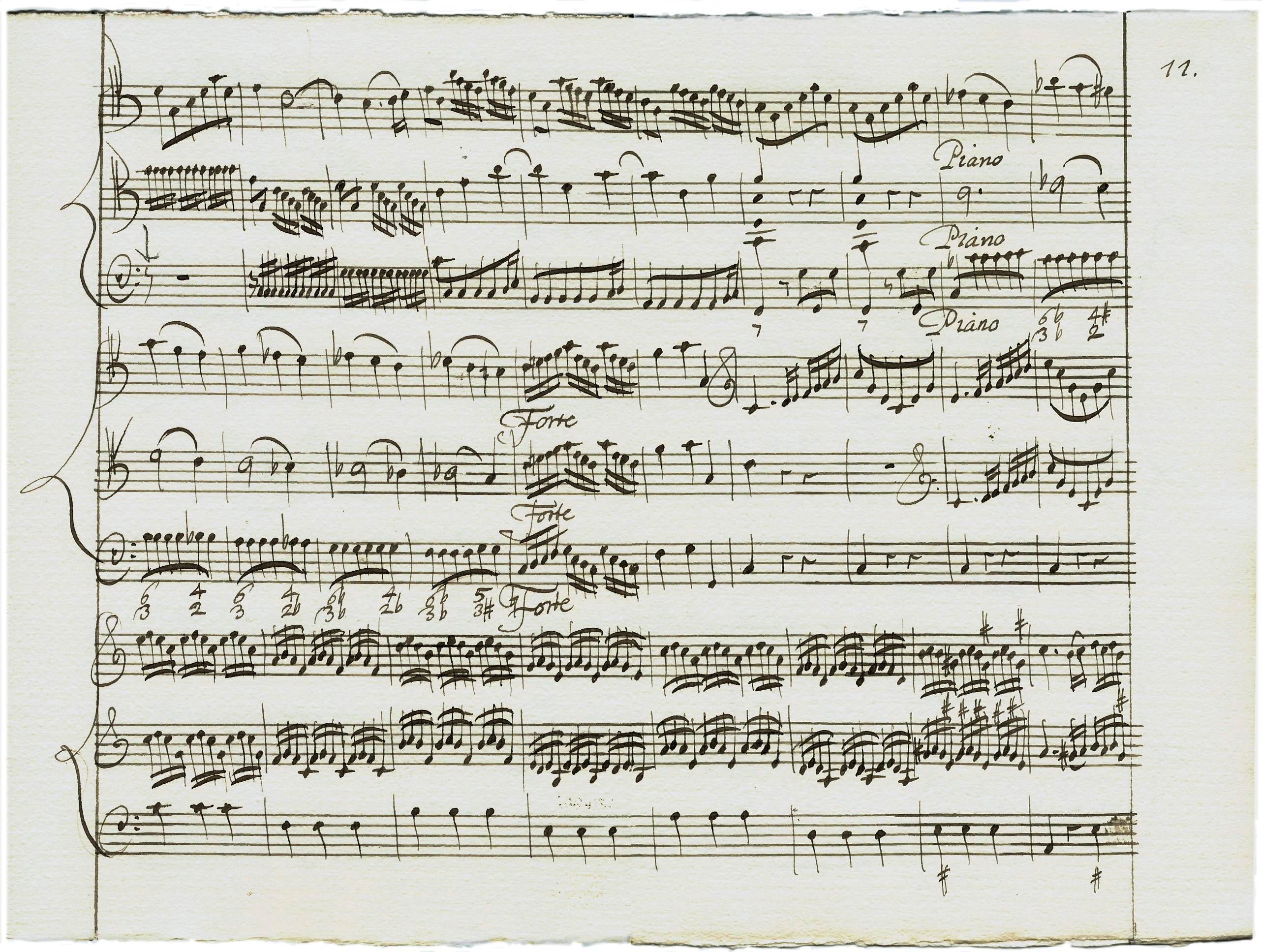
Federico Maria Sardelli manuscript (Concerto per due violoncelli piccoli in A minor, 2010)

In 2015 he published his first novel L'affare Vivaldi, (Sellerio), a historical investigation into the disappearance of Vivaldi's manuscripts.

In addition to his musical activities, Sardelli is also a painter, engraver and satirical writer. He is married to the violist and musicologist Bettina Hoffmann.

== Books and essays ==
- L'affare Vivaldi, Sellerio, Palermo, 2015.
- Catalogo delle concordanze musicali vivaldiane, Fondazione G. Cini, Istituto Italiano Antonio Vivaldi, «Quaderni vivaldiani», XVI, Firenze, Olschki, 2009.

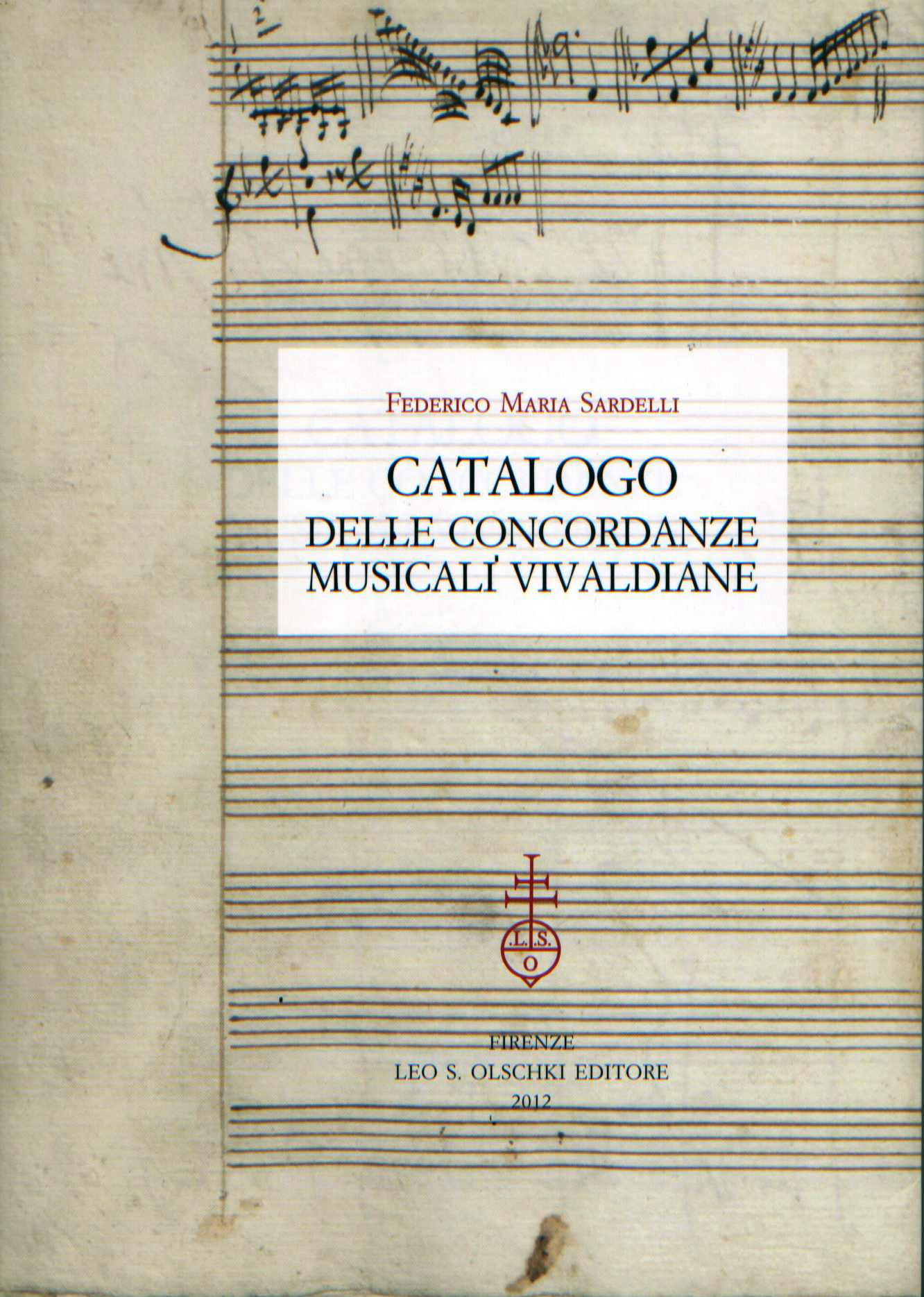
Federico M. Sardelli, Catalogo delle concordanze musicali vivaldiane, 2009

- Vivaldi’s Music for Flute and Recorder, Aldershot, Ashgate, 2007, 316 pp., translated by Michael Talbot.
- Dall'esterno all'interno: criteri di autenticità e catalogazione, «Studi vivaldiani», 7, Firenze, S.P.E.S., 2007.
- Una nuova sonata per flauto dritto di Vivaldi, «Studi vivaldiani», 6, Firenze, S.P.E.S., 2006, pp. 41–51.
- Le opere giovanili di Antonio Vivaldi, «Studi vivaldiani», 5, Firenze, S.P.E.S., 2005, pp. 45–78.
- Il flauto nell'Italia del primo Settecento, «Ad Parnassum», vol. 2, Issue 3, April 2004, pp. 104–152.
- Un nuovo ritratto di Antonio Vivaldi, «Studi vivaldiani», 2, Firenze, S.P.E.S., 2002, pp. 107–114.
- Vivaldi a Ulm negli acquisti di Johann Kleinknecht, «Studi vivaldiani», 2, Firenze, S.P.E.S., 2002, pp. 99–106.
- La musica per flauto di Antonio Vivaldi, Fondazione G. Cini, Istituto Italiano Antonio Vivaldi, «Quaderni vivaldiani», XI, Firenze, Olschki, 2001, 250 pp.
- Ciuffi rossi ed altri dettagli. Per una riconsiderazione dell’iconografia vivaldiana, «Informazioni e studi vivaldiani», 15, Milano, Ricordi, 1994, pp. 103–113.

== Selected discography ==
- The Young Vivaldi, first recording of RV 820 and other rare works of the youth, Modo Antiquo, Sony, 2015
- Federico Maria Sardelli, Sacred Music, Accademia dei Dissennati, Modo Antiquo, Brilliant Classics, 2014
- Federico Maria Sardelli, Baroque Concertos, Psalm, Chamber Music, Modo Antiquo, Brilliant Classics, 2013
- Vivaldi, Orlando furioso (RV 819), 1714 opera, Naïve 2011
- Vivaldi, New Discoveries II, Naïve
- Vivaldi, New Discoveries I, Naïve
- Georg Friedrich Händel, Arie italiane per basso, Ildebrando D'Arcangelo, bass, Federico Maria Sardelli, conductor, Deutsche Grammophon, September 2007
- Antonio Vivaldi, L'Atenaide (3 CD), Federico Maria Sardelli, conductor, World Première & Complete Recording, Naïve, September 2007
- Antonio Vivaldi, I Concerti di Sfida, Anton Steck, violino, Federico Maria Sardelli, conductor, World Première Recording, Naïve, April 2007
- Claudio Monteverdi, Combattimento di Tancredi e Clorinda, Lamento d’Arianna, Anna Caterina Antonacci, mezzosoprano, Federico Maria Sardelli, conductor, Naïve, February 2006
- Antonio Vivaldi, Opera Aria, Sandrine Piau, soprano, Ann Hallenberg, alto, Paul Agnew, tenor, Federico Maria Sardelli, conductor, World Première & Complete Recording, Naïve, September 2005
- Alessandro Scarlatti, Inferno, Cantate drammatiche, Elisabeth Scholl, soprano, Federico Maria Sardelli, conductor, CPO, 2006
- Antonio Vivaldi, Tito Manlio (3 CD), Federico Maria Sardelli, conductor, Amadeus Speciale, April 2004/CPO, 2005
- Antonio Vivaldi, Orlando furioso RV 728 (3 CD), Federico Maria Sardelli, conductor, Amadeus Speciale, February 2003/CPO, 2007
- Antonio Vivaldi, Arsilda, regina di Ponto (3 CD), Federico Maria Sardelli, conductor, WDR, August 2001/CPO, October 2004
- Arcangelo Corelli, Concerti Grossi op. VI (2 CD), Federico Maria Sardelli, conductor, World Première Recording with wind instruments, Grammy Awards Nominée 2000, Amadeus speciale March 1998/Tactus, 1999
- Antonio Vivaldi, Juditha Triumphans (2 CD), Federico Maria Sardelli, conductor, Amadeus/WDR, December 2000, Tactus, 2002
- Antonio Vivaldi, Concerti per molti Istromenti, Federico Maria Sardelli, conductor, Grammy Awards Nominée 1997, Tactus, 1996
- Antonio Vivaldi, Le Sinfonie dai Drammi per Musica, Federico Maria Sardelli, conductor, World Première & Complete Recording, Frame, 2002
- Antonio Vivaldi, I 12 Concerti di Parigi, Federico Maria Sardelli, conductor, World Première Recording, Amadeus, 1999/Tactus, 1999
- Antonio Vivaldi, Le Cantate (4 CD), Federico Maria Sardelli, conductor, World Prémiere Recording, Tactus 1998/99, 4 vols. cantatas for soprano and b.c.
- Antonio Vivaldi, I Concerti per flauto traversiere vol. I, Federico Maria Sardelli, flute and conductor, Tactus, 1994
- Antonio Vivaldi, I Concerti per flauto traversiere vol. II, Federico Maria Sardelli, flute and conductor, Tactus, 1995
- Pietro Antonio Locatelli, Sonate à tre op. V, Federico Maria Sardelli, flute and conductor, Tactus, 1996
- Alessandro Scarlatti, I Concerti per flauto, Federico Maria Sardelli, flute and conductor, World Première Recording, Tactus, 1993

== Critical editions ==
- Antonio Vivaldi, Arie d'opera per Baritono e Basso, Milano, Ricordi, 2008
- Antonio Vivaldi, Arie d'opera per Tenore, Milano, Ricordi, 2008
- Antonio Vivaldi, Concerto per 2 violini e 2 violoncelli RV 575, critical edition, «Antonio Vivaldi. Opere incomplete», 6, Firenze, S.P.E.S., 2006.
- Antonio Vivaldi, Arie d'opera per Mezzosoprano e Contralto, Milano, Ricordi, 2005
- Antonio Vivaldi, Arie d'opera per Soprano, Milano, Ricordi, 2005
- Nicholas Chédeville, Il Pastor Fido (attributed to Vivaldi), critical edition, Bärenreiter, Kassel, 2005
- Antonio Vivaldi, Concerto in due cori per 2 violini principali e 2 organi RV 584, critical edition, «Antonio Vivaldi. Opere incomplete», 3, Firenze, S.P.E.S., 2003.
- Antonio Vivaldi, Concerto in due cori per 2 violini principali e 2 organi RV 584, critical edition, «Antonio Vivaldi. Opere incomplete», 3, Firenze, S.P.E.S., 2003.
- Antonio Vivaldi, Concerti per fagotto RV 468 e RV 482, critical edition, «Antonio Vivaldi. Opere incomplete», 2, Firenze, S.P.E.S., 2002.
- Antonio Vivaldi, Orlando Furioso, RV 728, Fondazione G. Cini, Istituto Italiano Antonio Vivaldi, 2002.
- Antonio Vivaldi, VI Concerti Opera Decima, facsimile edition, «Vivaldiana», 1, Firenze, S.P.E.S., 2001.
- Antonio Vivaldi, Concerti per traversiere RV 431 e RV 432, critical edition, «Antonio Vivaldi. Opere incomplete», Firenze, S.P.E.S., 2001.
- Antonio Vivaldi, Arsilda Regina di Ponto, RV 700, Fondazione G. Cini, Istituto Italiano Antonio Vivaldi, 2001.
- Antonio Vivaldi, Opera Seconda, facsimile edition, «Strumentalismo italiano», 86, Firenze, S.P.E.S., 2001.

== Comic works ==
Sardelli is a longtime collaborator on the satirical magazine Il Vernacoliere and contributes through his satire of Italian mainstream culture, religion and religious kitsch. His nonsensical style resembles that of Monty Python and Luis Buñuel, but he has a recognizable style of his own rooted in Tuscan popular humor. Sardelli, as a comic author, constructs elaborate parodies of Padre Pio or of Italian sagre (popular festivals that Italian farming communities once often organized); the so-called Proesie ("Proetries") that are ineffable nonsense works. His Le Più Belle Cartoline Del Mondo ("Most Beautiful Postcards Of The World") are elaborate stories built around 60s and 70's kitsch postcards, often representing children or couples, written in an absurdly baroque and archaic style and lexicon. A recurring character in these stories is that of the fictional dwarf Gargilli Gargiulo.

Characters and comic-strips by Sardelli include:

Clem Momigliano: an improbable detective whose character blatantly lampoons mainstream heroic characters of adventure comics. Like Mandrake he has a man of African descent as a sidekick, Negro Balongo, who he unashamedly exploits like a slave. Most of Clem's adventures begin with a classic opener mocking adventure comics and have an improbable mission issued by a mysterious "Chief", only to collapse miserably because of some trivial impediment such as the neighbour using Clem's rocket to anchor her laundry line.

Il Bibliotecario ("The Librarian"): a peculiar comic strip made always of two-frames variations on the same theme: in the first the librarian greets an unnamed elderly woman with a flowery and archaic sentence and the woman will ask for an impossibly difficult to find ancient book, such as the "Gabinetto Armonico" of Filippo Bonanni. In the second frame the librarian will reply with totally unconnected and, more often than not, heavily offensive behaviour.

Merda ("Shit"): a mute strip where various characters are nonsensically obsessed by their relationship with excrement.

Circo ("Circus"): about the adventures of a circus whose animals indulge in embarrassing activities just when the show is to start.

== Comic bibliography ==
- Il Libro Cuore (forse), Livorno, Mario Cardinali Editore, 1998 (a parody of the famous Edmondo De Amicis's Cuore)
- Trippa, I più grandi eroi dei fumetti (forse), Livorno, Mario Cardinali Editore, 1999 (comic strips)
- I Miracoli di Padrepio, Livorno, Mario Cardinali Editore, 2002 (comic miracles of S. Pio)
- Le più belle cartolyne del mondo, Livorno, Mario Cardinali Editore, 2005 (a gallery of the most terrifying postcards, with comments)
- Proesie, Livorno, Mario Cardinali Editore, 2004 (first book of poetry)
- Proesie II, Livorno, Mario Cardinali Editore, 2008 (second book of poetry)
- Paperi in Fiamme, Livorno, Mario Cardinali Editore, 2008 (comic strips)
- Saggi di Filosofia Neorazionalista, con un metodo sicuro per indovinare i gratta e vinci giusti e levare il malocchio, Livorno, Mario Cardinali Editore, 2009 (comic writings)
- Rassegna staNpa, Livorno, Mario Cardinali Editore, 2012 (Fake front pages of newspapers)
- Tutte le Proesie, Livorno, Mario Cardinali Editore, 2014 (Complete collection of poetries with many unpublished works)
