= Paladin =

Legendary knights of Charlemagne's court

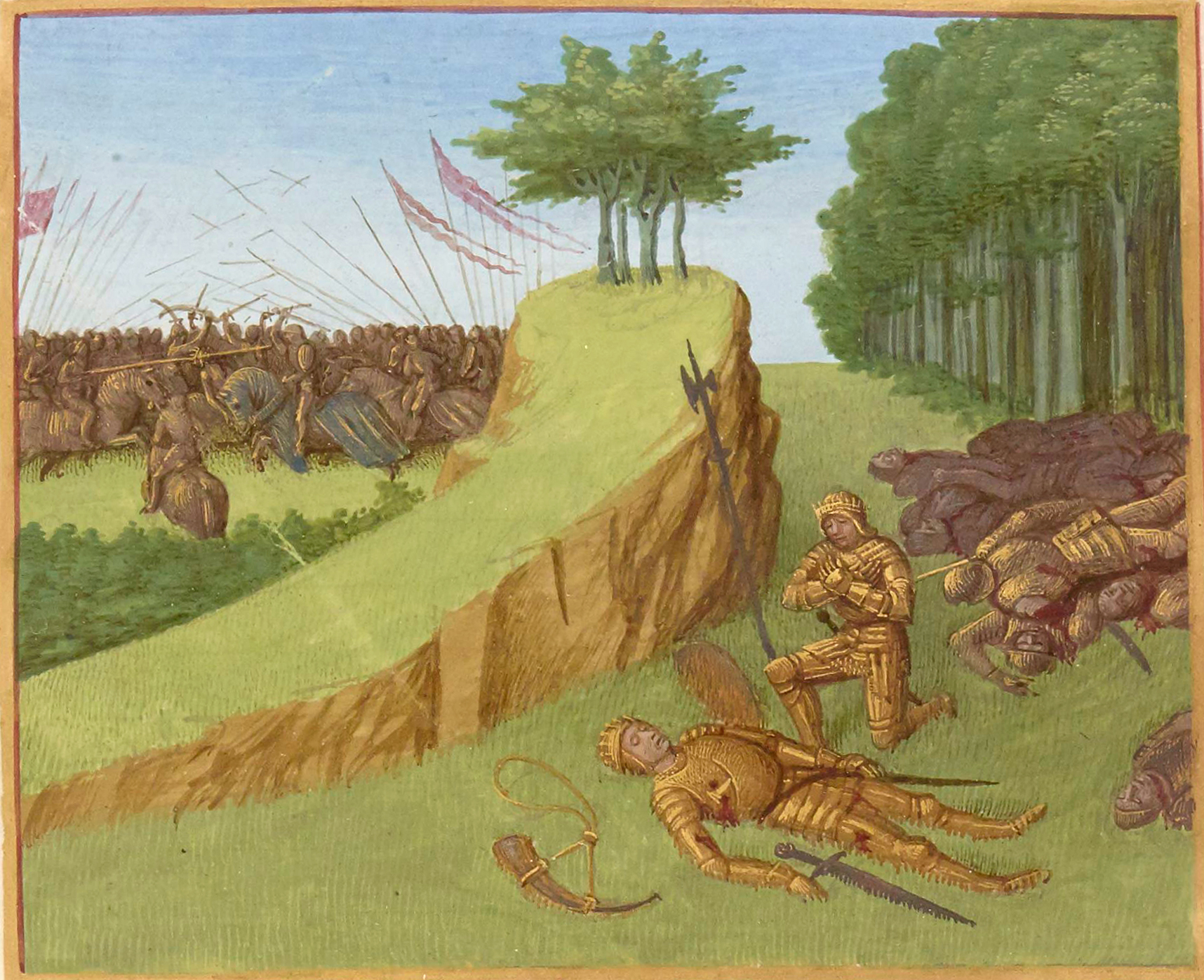
The death of Roland at the Battle of Roncevaux (manuscript illustration c. 1455–1460)

The Paladins, also called the Twelve Peers (French: Douze Pairs), are twelve legendary knights, the foremost members of Charlemagne's court in the 8th century. They first appear in the 12th-century chanson de geste cycle of the Matter of France, where they play a similar role to the Knights of the Round Table in Arthurian romance. In these romantic portrayals, the chivalric paladins represent Christianity against a Saracen (Muslim) invasion of Europe. The names of the paladins vary between sources, but there are always twelve of them (a number with Christian associations) led by Roland (spelled Orlando in later Italian sources). The paladins' most influential appearance is in The Song of Roland, written between 1050 and 1115, which narrates the heroic death of Roland at the Battle of Roncevaux Pass.

The legend is based on the historical Umayyad invasion of Gaul and subsequent conflict in the Marca Hispanica between the Frankish Empire and the Emirate of Córdoba. The term paladin is from Old French, deriving from the Latin comes palatinus (count palatine), a title given to close retainers.

The paladins remained a popular subject throughout medieval French literature. Literature of the Italian Renaissance (15th and 16th centuries) introduced more fantasy elements into the legend, which later became a popular subject for operas in the Baroque music of the 16th and 17th centuries. During the 19th and early 20th centuries the term was reused outside fiction for small numbers of close military confidants serving national leaders. Modern depictions of paladins are often an individual knight-errant holy warrior or combat healer, influenced by the paladin character class that appeared in Dungeons & Dragons in 1975.

== Etymology ==
The earliest recorded instance of the word paladin in the English language dates to 1592, in Delia (Sonnet XLVI) by Samuel Daniel. It entered English through the Middle French word paladin, which itself derived from the Latin palatinus, ultimately from the name of Palatine Hill – also translated as 'of the palace' in the Frankish title of Mayor of the Palace. A presumptive Old French form *palaisin was already loaned into late Middle English as palasin in c. 1400.

Over time paladin came to refer to other high-level officials in the imperial, majestic and royal courts. The word palatine, used in various European countries in the medieval and modern eras, has the same derivation.

By the 13th century, words referring specifically to Charlemagne's peers began appearing in European languages; the earliest is the Italian paladino. Modern French has paladin, Spanish has paladín or paladino (reflecting alternate derivations from the French and Italian), while German has Paladin. By extension, paladin has come to refer to any chivalrous hero such as King Arthur's Knights of the Round Table.

== Historical title ==
In the Roman imperial period, a palatinus was one of the closest retainers of the emperor, who lived in the imperial residence as part of the emperor's household. The title survived into the medieval period, as comes palatinus. However, the modern spelling paladin is now reserved for the fictional characters of the chanson de geste, while the conventional English translation of comes palatinus is count palatine. After the fall of Rome, a new feudal type of title, also known simply as palatinus, started developing. The Frankish kings of the Merovingian dynasty (reigned 480–750) employed a high official, the comes palatinus, who at first assisted the king in his judicial duties and at a later date discharged many of these himself. Other counts palatine were employed on military and administrative work.

In the Visigothic Kingdom, the Officium Palatinum consisted of a number of men with the title of count that managed the various departments of the royal household. The Comes Cubiculariorum oversaw the chamberlains, the Comes Scanciorun directed the cup-bearers, the Comes Stabulorum directed the equerries in charge of the stables, etc. The Ostrogothic Kingdom also maintained palatine counts with titles such as Comes Patrimonium, who was in charge of the patrimonial or private real estate of the king, and others. The system was maintained by the Carolingian sovereigns (reigned 751–987). A Frankish capitulary of 882 and Hincmar, archbishop of Reims, writing about the same time, testify to the extent to which the judicial work of the Frankish Empire had passed into their hands.

Instead of remaining near the person of the king, some of the counts palatine were sent to various parts of his empire to act as judges and governors, the districts ruled by them being called palatinates. By the High Middle Ages, the title "count" had become increasingly common, to the point that both great magnates who ruled regions that were the size of duchies, and local castle-lords, might style themselves "count". As the great magnates began to centralize their power over their local castle-lords, they felt the need to assert the difference between themselves and these minor "counts". Therefore, several of these great magnates began styling themselves "Count Palatine", signifying great counts ruling regions equivalent to duchies, such as the Counts Palatine of Champagne in the 13th century. The Count Palatine of the Rhine served as prince-elector from "time immemorial" (with Wigeric of Lotharingia reaching back to the late Carolingian era), noted as such in a papal letter of 1261, and confirmed as elector in the Golden Bull of 1356. Palatin was also used as a title in the Kingdom of Hungary.

== Medieval romance ==
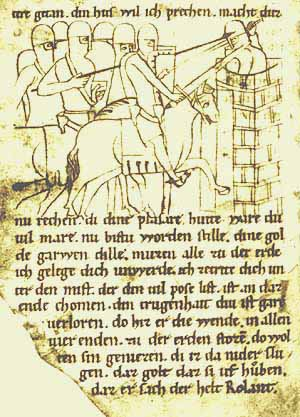
Roland storms the temple of Muhammad (Codex Palatinus Germanicus, 12th century)

In the French courtly literature of the 12th century, the paladins are the twelve closest companions of Charlemagne, comparable to the role of the Knights of the Round Table in Arthurian romance.

The names of the twelve paladins vary from romance to romance, and often more than twelve are named. The number is popular because it resembles the Twelve Apostles (etc.). Always named among the paladins are Roland and Oliver; other recurring characters are Archbishop Turpin, Ogier the Dane, Huon of Bordeaux, Fierabras, Renaud de Montauban and Ganelon.

Their greatest moments come in The Song of Roland (written between c. 1040 and 1115), which depicts their defense of Charlemagne's army against the Saracens of Al-Andalus, and their deaths at the Battle of Roncevaux Pass due to the treachery of Ganelon. The Song of Roland lists the twelve paladins as Roland, Charlemagne's nephew and the chief hero among the paladins; Oliver, Roland's friend and strongest ally; and Gérin, Gérier (these two are killed in the same laisse [123] by the same Saracen, Grandonie), Bérengier, Otton, Samson, Engelier, Ivon, Ivoire, Anséis, Girard. Other characters elsewhere considered part of the twelve appear in the song, such as Archbishop Turpin and Ogier the Dane.

The paladins figure into many chansons de geste and other tales associated with Charlemagne. In Fierabras (c. 1170), they retrieve holy relics stolen from Rome by the Saracen giant Fierabras. In some versions, Fierabras is converted to Christianity and joins the ranks of the paladins himself. In Le Pèlerinage de Charlemagne they accompany their king on a pilgrimage to Jerusalem and Constantinople in order to outdo the Byzantine Emperor Hugo.

== Early modern reception ==
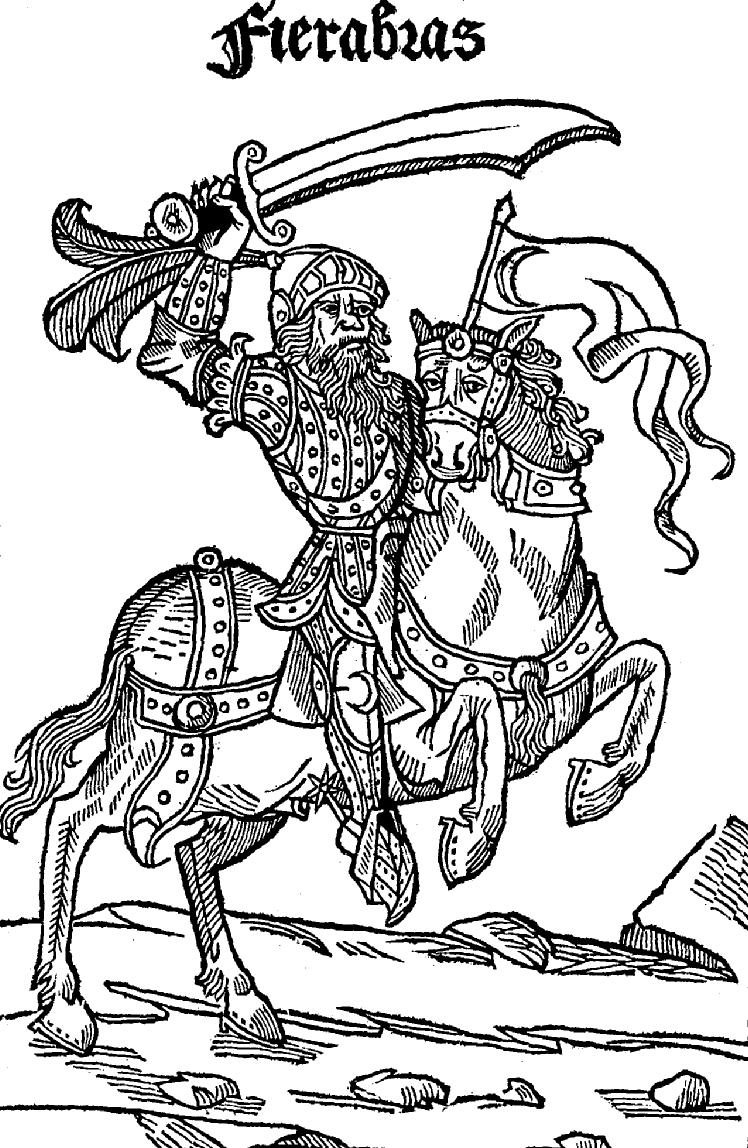
Fierabras (1497 woodcut)

The Italian Renaissance authors Matteo Maria Boiardo and Ludovico Ariosto, whose works were once as widely read and respected as William Shakespeare's, contributed prominently to the literary and poetical reworking of the tales of the epic deeds of the paladins. Their works, Orlando Innamorato and Orlando Furioso, send the paladins on even more fantastic adventures than their predecessors. They list the paladins quite differently, but keep the number at twelve.

Boiardo and Ariosto's paladins are Orlando (Roland), Charlemagne's nephew and the chief hero among the paladins; Oliver, the rival to Roland; Ferumbras (Fierabras), the Saracen who became a Christian; Astolpho, descended from Charles Martel and cousin to Orlando; Ogier the Dane; Ganelon the betrayer, who appears in Dante Alighieri's Inferno; Rinaldo (Renaud de Montauban); Malagigi (Maugris), a sorcerer; Florismart, a friend to Orlando; Guy de Bourgogne; Namo (Naimon or Namus), Duke of Bavaria, Charlemagne's trusted adviser; and Otuel, another converted Saracen.

In the Baroque era, Ariosto's poem was the basis of many operas. Among the earliest were Francesca Caccini's La liberazione di Ruggiero dall'isola d'Alcina ("The Liberation of Ruggiero from Alcina's Island", 1625) and Luigi Rossi's Il palazzo incantato (1642). Antonio Vivaldi staged three operas on themes from Ariosto: Orlando furioso (1713) by Giovanni Alberto Ristori, Orlando Furioso (1714), with music by Ristori and by himself, and Orlando (1727). In France, Jean-Baptiste Lully turned to Ariosto for his tragédie en musique Roland (1685).

Perhaps the most famous operas inspired by the poem are those by Handel: Orlando (1733), Ariodante and Alcina (1735). Les Paladins is a 1760 opera by Jean-Philippe Rameau. The plot is based on a verse tale by La Fontaine, Le petit chien qui secoue de l'argent et des pierreries, itself derived from an episode in Ariosto's Orlando Furioso.

The enthusiasm for operas based on Ariosto continued into the Classical era and beyond with such examples as Niccolò Piccinni's Roland (1778), Haydn's Orlando paladino (1782), Méhul's Ariodant (1799) and Simon Mayr's Ginevra di Scozia (1801).

The title of Paladin is revived in the early modern period for the closest retainers of a monarch. Thus, the leaders of armies supporting the Protestant Frederick V in the Thirty Years' War were named Paladins.

== Modern reception ==
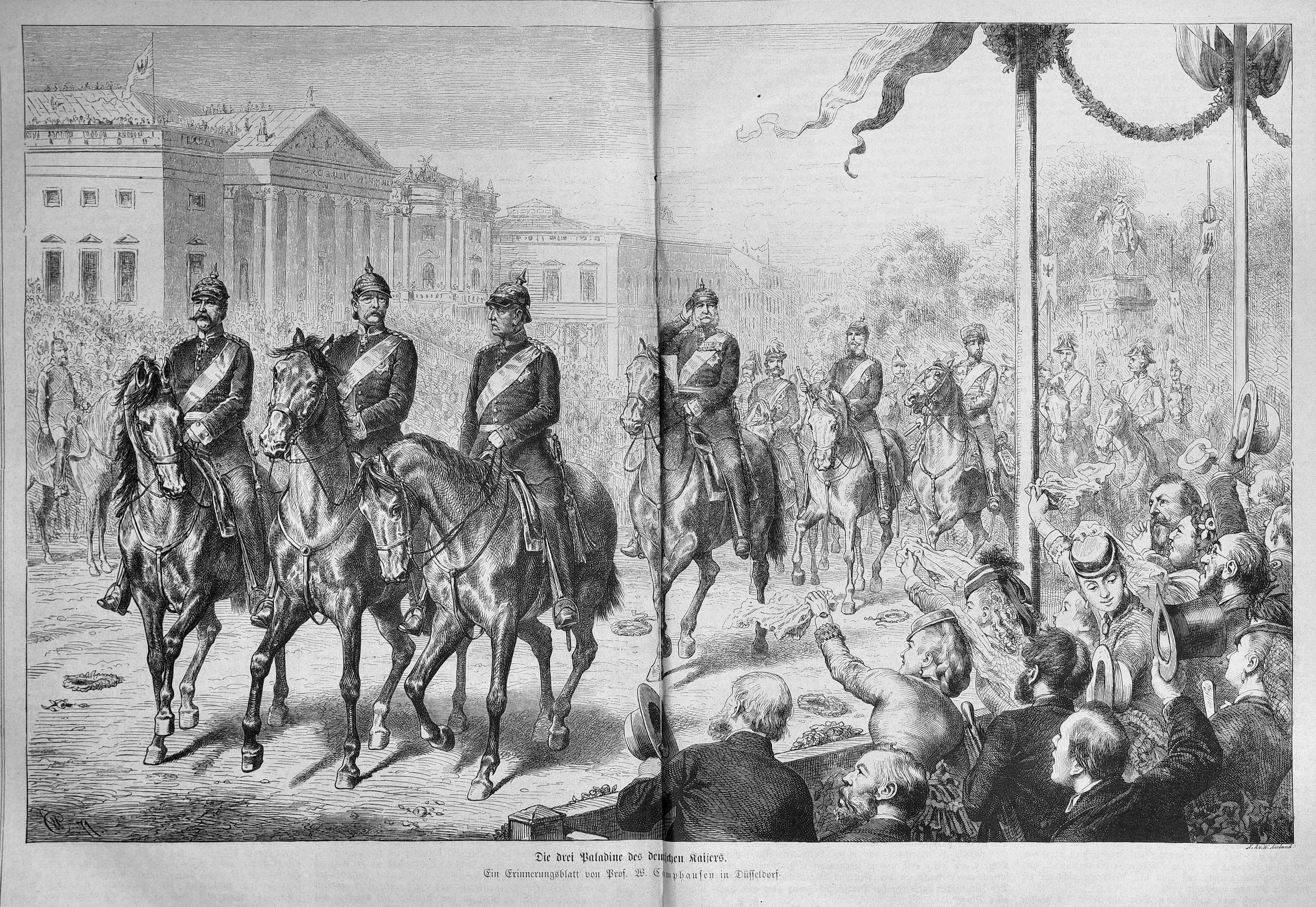
Die drei Paladine des deutschen Kaisers by Wilhelm Camphausen (Die Gartenlaube, 1871)

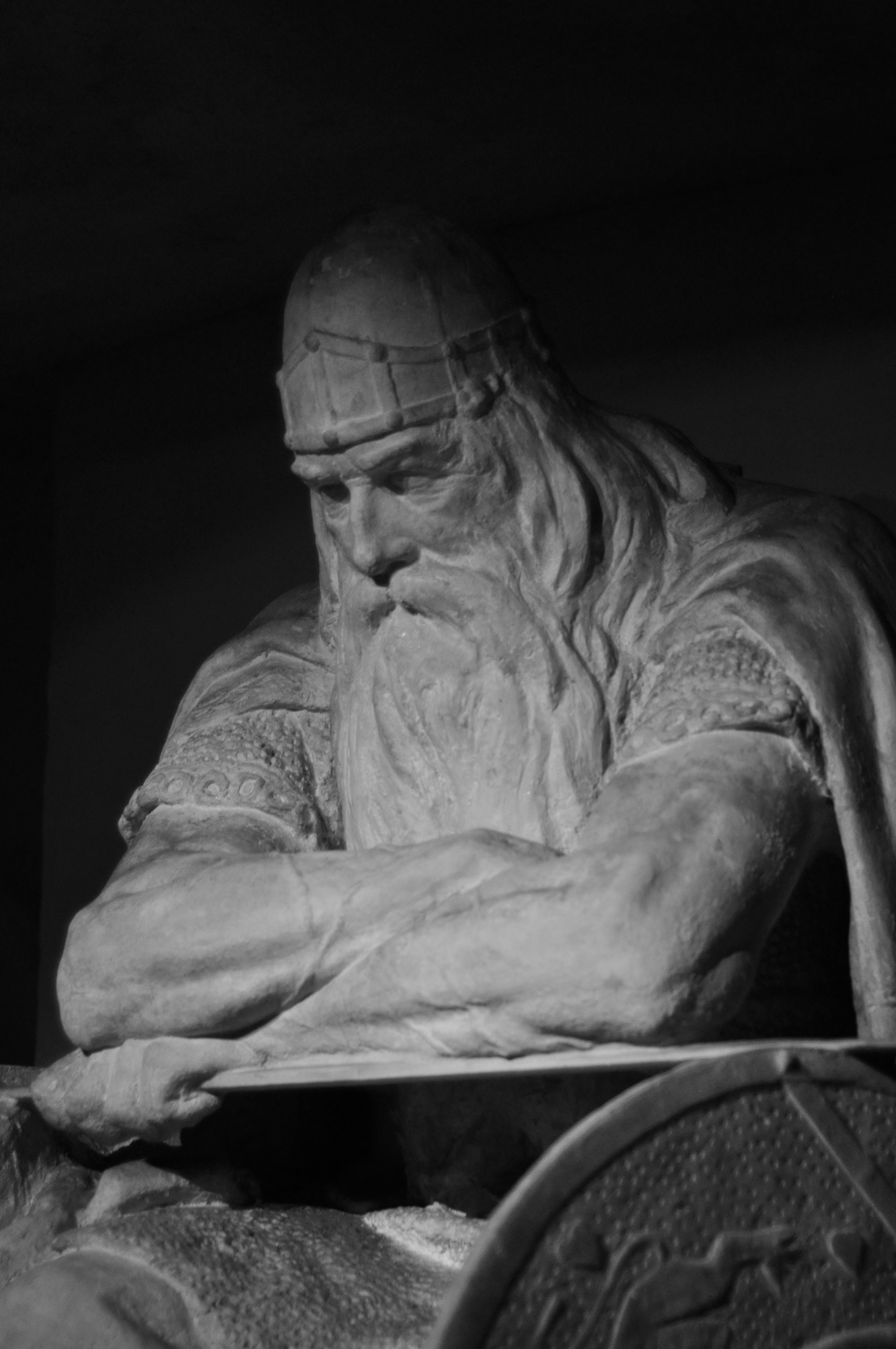
Hans Peder Pedersen-Dan's 1907 statue of Holger Danske (Ogier the Dane) in the casemates at Kronborg castle, Denmark

Paladin was used informally of the closest confidants of the German Emperor. Thus, Die Gartenlaube in 1871 named Albrecht von Roon, Otto von Bismarck and Helmuth Karl Bernhard von Moltke as "the three Paladins of the German Emperor". Similarly, British generals Garnet Wolseley and Frederick Roberts have been dubbed "Queen Victoria's Paladins". Following this template, Adolf Hitler used to refer to Hermann Göring as his Paladin.

While the Arthurian "Matter of Britain" enjoyed a major revival in the 19th century in the hands of the Romantic and Victorian poets, writers, and artists, the "Matter of France" has generally received less attention. The Song of Roland has nevertheless inspired numerous modern works, including Graham Greene's The Confidential Agent (1939), and Stephen King's Dark Tower series.

Emanuele Luzzati's animated short film, I paladini di Francia, together with Giulio Gianini, in 1960, was turned into the children's picture-story book, with verse narrative, I Paladini de Francia ovvero il tradimento di Gano di Maganz ('The Paladins of France or the treachery of Gano of Maganz', 1962). This was republished in English, as Ronald and the Wizard Calico (1969).

In the later 20th century, Paladin has become a trope in modern fantasy. A paladin character class was first introduced in 1975 for Dungeons & Dragons in Supplement I – Greyhawk. The Dungeons & Dragons character class was reportedly inspired by the protagonist of the 1962 fantasy novel Three Hearts and Three Lions, which was itself a pastiche of various elements of medieval and post-medieval legend, including elements of the Matter of France. I paladini — storia d'armi e d'amori is a 1983 Italian fantasy film. As a character class in video games, the Paladin stock character was introduced in 1985, in The Bard's Tale. In Age of Empires II, the Paladin is the ultimate upgrade for knights of some European and Eurasian steppe civilizations. And in 2008, the Hollywood action film Jumper featured characters known as Paladins, with a leader named Roland. Though the movie was adapted from a 1993 science-fiction novel of the same name, the Paladin reference is not in the book.
