= Orlando furioso (Vivaldi, 1714) =

Opera by Antonio Vivaldi (1714)

- Opera by Antonio Vivaldi
- Orlando furioso (1714), title page of the libretto.
- Librettist: Grazio Braccioli
- Language: Italian
- Premiere: 1714; Teatro Sant'Angelo, Venice

Orlando furioso RV 819 (Italian pronunciation: [orˈlando fuˈrjoːzo, -so], Teatro San Angelo, Venice 1714) is a three-act opera surviving in manuscript in Antonio Vivaldi's personal library, only partly related to his better known Orlando furioso (RV 728) of 1727. It is a recomposition of an Orlando furioso written by Giovanni Alberto Ristori which had been very successfully staged by Vivaldi and his father's impresa in 1713, and whose music survives in a few fragments retained in the score of RV 819. Therefore, Vivaldi's first cataloguer Peter Ryom did not assign the opera a RV number, but catalogued it as RV Anh. 84. The libretto was by Grazio Braccioli.

== Authorship ==
Federico Maria Sardelli, according to the studies of Reinhard Strohm, argues that Orlando RV 819 was entirely recomposed by Vivaldi, starting from the original Ristori's opera that Vivaldi himself had already changed during the numerous representations of the season 1713. He assigned to it the catalogue number RV 819. One suggestion is that Vivaldi avoided putting his own name on the opera having himself only recently taken direction of the Teatro San Angelo. Against this others consider that the bulk of the opera is a copy of Ristori's lost work.

== Opera ==
Unlike the Orlando furioso (RV 728) of 1727, in which the role of Orlando is sung by a contralto, the 1714 opera assigns the title role to a bass. The third act is missing and the rest of the score (evidently used in performances by the composer) is incomplete. Two arias are lost, seven arias are incomplete (only the bass part is extant) and three arias are identical with extant arias in RV 727 and RV 729.

== Recording ==
The French label Naïve, which had already recorded the more famous Orlando furioso and Orlando finto pazzo for its Vivaldi Edition, released a recording of the July 20, 2012 première at the Festival de Beaune, with Sardelli conducting Modo Antiquo and singers including Riccardo Novaro as Orlando, Gaëlle Arquez as Angelica, Romina Basso as Alcina and Teodora Gheorghiu as Bradamante. Given the heavily defective nature of the surviving manuscript, Sardelli had to reconstruct or compose ex novo the seven incomplete arias, in a Vivaldian style.

== See also ==
- List of operas by Antonio Vivaldi
