= La Silvia =

Opera by Antonio Vivaldi

- Dramma per musica by Antonio Vivaldi
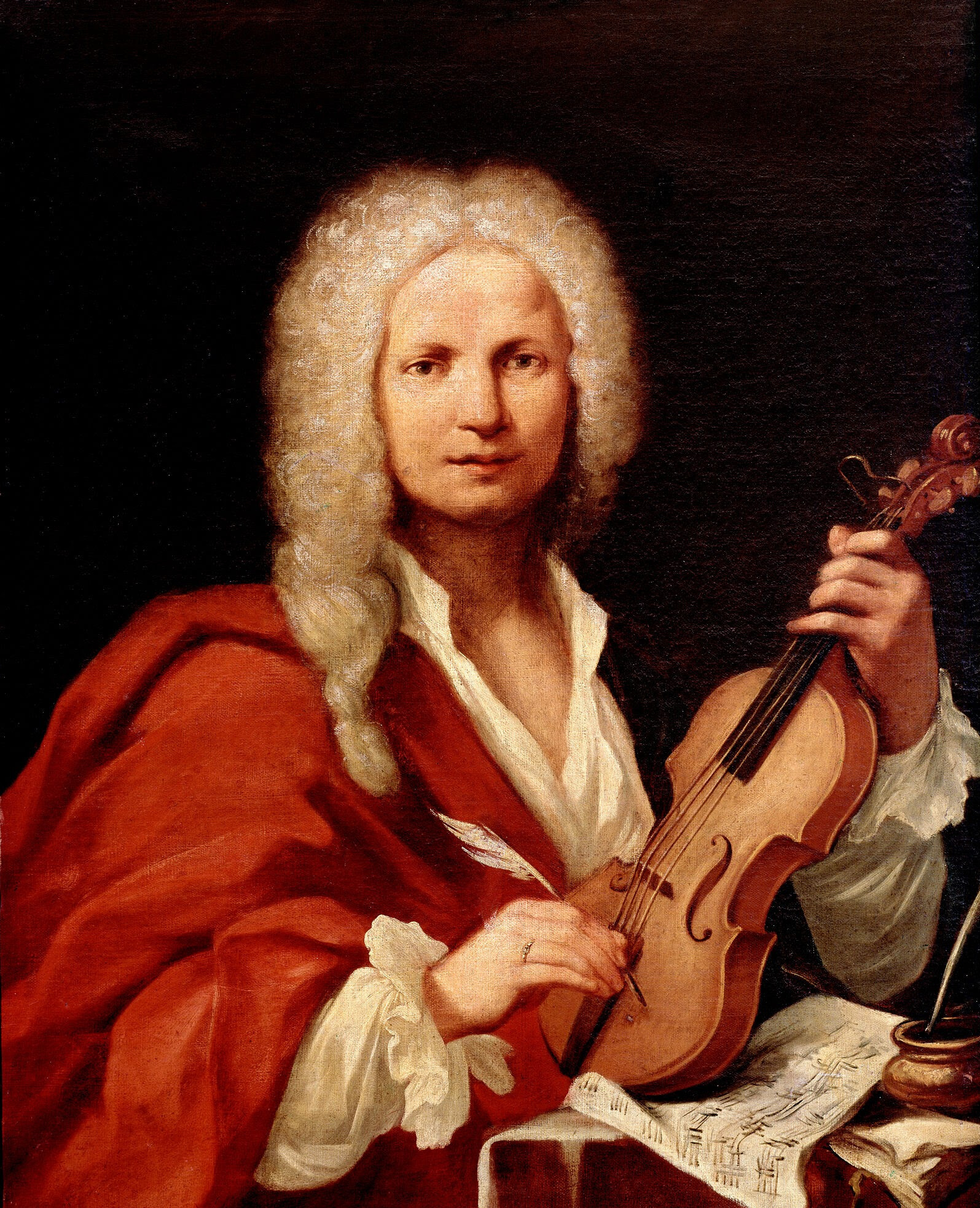
- Putative portrait of Antonio Vivaldi, c. 1723
- Librettist: Enrico Bissari
- Language: Italian
- Premiere: 28 August 1721; Teatro Regio Ducale, Milan

La Silvia (RV 734) is an dramma pastorale per musica in three acts by Antonio Vivaldi to an Italian libretto by Enrico Bissari. It was first performed on 28 August 1721 at the Teatro Regio Ducale in Milan on the occasion of the birthday celebrations of the Austrian Empress Elisabeth Christine, wife of Emperor Charles VI of Austria.

== Background ==
In 1718 Vivaldi had been nominated maestro di cappella di camera, at the court of Philipp von Hessen-Darmstadt in Mantua for whom he composed Armida al campo d'Egitto, Teuzzone, Scanderbeg (all 1718) and then Tito Manlio (1719) and La Candace (1720). On his return to Venice, following performance of La verità in cimento at the Teatro Sant'Angelo, Vivaldi, thinly disguised as "Aldiviva", became, along with Giovanni Porta, Anna Maria Strada and others, one of the principal targets of the gentleman-composer Benedetto Marcello's satirical pamphlet Il teatro alla moda (written 1718-1719, published 1720).

Bissari's text had originally been written in 1710 as a play for Princess Teresa Kunegunda Sobieska, second wife of the Bavarian elector Maximillian II Emmanuel. The opera was performed again in Milan in 1723 and 1724. 8 of the arias are preserved in the Biblioteca Nazionale di Torino.

== Roles ==
Role	Voice type	Premiere cast, 28 August 1721
Silvia	soprano	Margarita Gualandi
Elpino	soprano (en travesti)	Anna Bombacciari
Tirsi	alto castrato	Giovanni Battista Minelli
Nerina	soprano	Anna Maria Strada
Egisto	tenor	Annibale Pio Fabri
Faustulo	bass	Giuseppe Montanari

== Recordings ==
- 2001 (reconstruction of nine surviving arias) Roberta Invernizzi, Gloria Banditelli, John Elwes, Philippe Cantor. Ensemble Baroque de Nice, dir. Gilbert Bezzina. Ligia. 1CD.
