= Bettina Hoffmann (musician) =

German viola da gambist and cellist

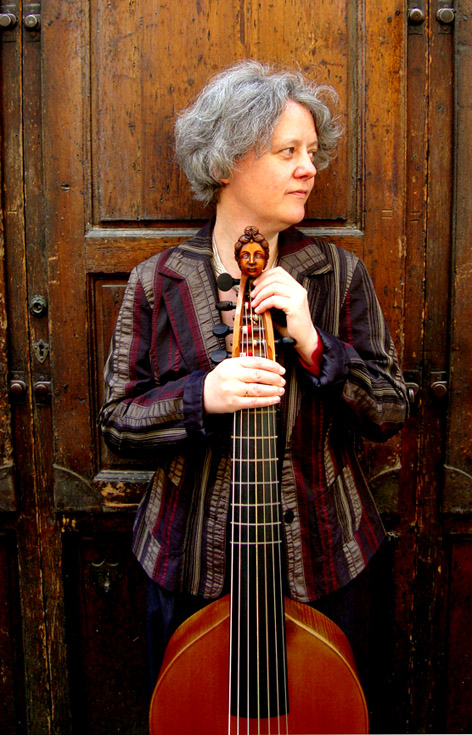
- Born: 1959 (age 66–67); Düsseldorf, West Germany
- Occupations: viola da gambist and cellist; musicologist

Bettina Hoffmann (born 1959) is a German viola da gambist and cellist, musicologist, and music pedagogue. A specialist in Renaissance and Medieval music, she is the leader of the Renaissance and Medieval ensemble of Modo Antiquo. She has an extensive discography, primarily on the Brilliant Classics and Tactus labels and participated in two Grammy-nominated recordings.

== Life and career ==
Hoffmann was born in Düsseldorf. She received her diploma in cello under Daniel Grosgurin at the Mannheim Musikhochschule and then trained in the viola da gamba under Wieland Kuijken. She moved to Florence in 1982 and was one of the founding members of Modo Antiquo. Hoffmann is married to Federico Maria Sardelli who founded Modo Antiquo in 1984. The group initially focused on Medieval and Renaissance music. When Sardelli established an additional 25-piece Baroque orchestra in 1987, Hoffman took over the directorship of the smaller Medieval and Renaissance ensemble.

The Medieval and Renaissance ensemble, which performs on modern copies of period instruments, records and tours a repertoire that includes Carmina Burana, music of the Crusades, and French, English and Italian medieval dances. In 1992 they made the first complete recording of the madrigals and ballate of the 14th-century composer Gherardello da Firenze for the Nuova Era label. The ensemble has also produced recordings of early music for the German broadcaster WDR.

As a musicologist, Hoffmann has contributed numerous articles to scholarly journals on early music, and particularly on the viola da gamba and related instruments. Her book La Viola da Gamba, a survey of the instrument's construction, technique and history from its origins to the classical period, was originally published in Italian in 2010 by L'Epos. It has since been published in German by Ortus in 2014 and in English by Routledge in 2017. Her other major work is Catalogo della musica solistica e cameristica per viola da gamba (Catalogue of Solo and Chamber Music for the Viola da Gamba) published by LIM Antiqua in 2001.

Hoffman is also a teacher of the viola da gamba, Baroque cello, and early music performance at the Conservatory of Vicenza and at the Scuola di Musica di Fiesole.
