= Gaëlle Arquez =

French mezzo-soprano (born 1983)

Gaëlle Arquez (born 1983) is a French operatic mezzo-soprano.

== Life and career ==
Arquez was born in Saintes from a father with Spanish origins and a Malagasy mother. After spending her early childhood in Ivory Coast, she returned to Saintes, where at the age of 10 she took piano lessons at the town's conservatory. She graduated in musicology and studied singing at the Conservatoire de Paris. Her teachers included Malcolm Walker, Kenneth Weiss, Jeff Cohen and Susan McCulloch. In 2007 and 2008, she toured France singing the title role in Ravel's L'enfant et les sortilèges. In 2009, she took on the title role in Janáček's The Cunning Little Vixen in a conservatoire production in Paris, which was subsequently also shown at the Théâtre Royal de Wallonie in Liège and the Reims Opera House. She won a number of prizes and scholarships, including the Prix de Chant du Conservatoire national supérieur de musique de Paris in 2009.

=== Opera ===
The focus of her repertoire is on Baroque music on the one hand, and on French classical repertoire on the other – from Lully and Rameau to Berlioz, Gounod, Offenbach and Bizet to Debussy and Messiaen. She is also known as a Mozart interpreter and occasionally performs from the German, Italian and Czech repertoire.

She has sung at the Opéra de Lille, the Opéra national de Lorraine in Nancy, at the Opéra de Lausanne and the Théâtre du Capitole in Toulouse, at the Opéra de Saint-Etienne, the Opéra de Dijon, the Grand Theatre de Bordeaux and the Royal Opera of Versailles, several times at the Brussels opera house la Monnaie and finally also in Paris. In 2013, she made her debut at the Opéra Bastille and has since sung Monteverdi, Mozart and Verdi roles at this house. That year Arquez also made a guest appearance at the Ópera Nacional de Chile in Santiago de Chile.

2013 also saw her first appearances in German-speaking countries - as Medea in Handel's Teseo at the Oper Frankfurt and as Idamante in Mozart's Idomeneo at the Theater an der Wien, staged by Damiano Michieletto. She continues to sing in Frankfurt, including the title roles in Carmen and Serse as well as the role of Mélisande. In 2015, she took on the title role in Offenbach's La Belle Hélène at the Théâtre du Châtelet in Paris. In the same year she made her debut at the Bayerische Staatsoper in Munich and in 2016 at the Komische Oper Berlin. retrieved 1 February 2021. On 16 October 2016, she made her debut at the Vienna State Opera, in the title role of a new production of Gluck's Armide, sung in the original French version, staged and equipped by a French team composed of Ivan Alexandre (director), Pierre-André Weitz (set) and Bertrand Killy (lighting). Les Musiciens du Louvre from Grenoble, conducted by Marc Minkowski, performed. Audience and press reacted enthusiastically, praising the singer's performance - both acting and vocal.

In summer 2017, she sang the title role in Carmen on the lake stage of the Bregenzer Festspiele.

=== Concert ===
In the concert hall, Arquez stands out in particular with recitals and as a specialist for works by Olivier Messiaen. She has given recitals at the Teatro Marcello in Rome, at the Salle Pleyel and Louvre in Paris, at the Festival de Beaune and at the Messiaen au pays de la Meije, where she was invited by Pierre Boulez in 2012. She has also sung in Villers-sur-Mer and Montfort-l'Amaury, in Neustadt an der Weinstraße and Karlsruhe, and at the Musashimo Cultural Foundation in Tokyo.

Arquez has sung under the musical direction of Pierre Boulez, René Jacobs, Philippe Jordan and Yann Molénat, among others.

== Roles ==
Bizet:

- Title role in Carmen

Cherubini:

- Neris in Médée

Debussy:

- Mélisande in Pelléas et Mélisande

Gluck:

- Titelpartie in Armide

Gounod:

- Stéphano in Roméo et Juliette

Handel:

- Medea in Teseo
- Zenobia in Radamisto
- Irene in Tamerlano
- Titelpartie in Serse
- Giulio Cesare (en travesti) in Giulio Cesare

Humperdinck:

- Hänsel in Hänsel und Gretel

Janáček:

- Title part in The Cunning Little Vixen

Lully:

- Libye in Phaëton

Massenet:

- Le Prince Charmant in Cendrillon

Monteverdi:

- Nerone, Drusilla und La Fortuna in L’incoronazione di Poppea

Mozart:

- Idamante in Idomeneo
- Zerlina in Don Giovanni
- Dorabella in Così fan tutte

Offenbach:

- Title role in La Belle Hélène
- La Muse/Niklausse in Les Contes d'Hoffmann

Rameau:

- Phébé in Castor et Pollux
- Iphise in Dardanus

Ravel:

- L'enfant in L'enfant et les sortilèges

Rossini:

- Rosina in Il barbiere di Siviglia
- Angelina in La Cenerentola

Verdi:

- Meg Page in Falstaff

== Recordings ==
- Vivaldi: Orlando furioso (Naïve, CD)
- Rameau: Dardanus (Alpha, CD 2013)
- Cherubini: Médée (BelAir Classiques, DVD)
- Bizet: Carmen, (Live recording from the Bregenz Festival 2017, CMajor, DVD)

== Awards ==
- 2006: Bourses Musicales of the Zonta Clubs de France
- 2007: Yamaha Music Foundation of Europe Competition
- 2009: Prix de Chant du Conservatoire national supérieur de musique de Paris
- 2009: Wigmore Hall Independent Opera Voice Fellowship
