= Atenaide (Vivaldi) =

Opera by Antonio Vivaldi

- Opera by Antonio Vivaldi
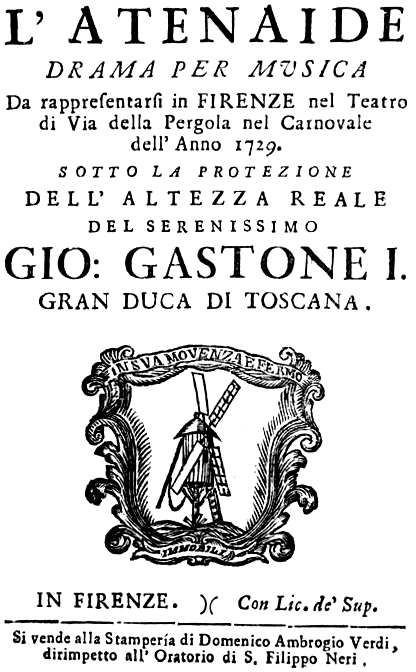
- Libretto title page
- Librettist: Apostolo Zeno
- Language: Italian
- Premiere: 29 December 1728

Atenaide (RV 702) is an opera by Antonio Vivaldi to a revised edition of a 1709 libretto by Apostolo Zeno for Caldara. It was first performed at the Teatro della Pergola in Florence on 29 December 1728 for the 1729 Carnival season.

== Roles ==
Roles, voice types, premiere cast
Role	Voice type	Premiere cast: 29 December 1728, Florence
Teodosio II, emperor, in love with Atenaide	soprano castrato	Gaetano Valletta
Atenaide (also called Eudossa), Leontino's daughter	soprano	Giustina Turcotti
Pulcheria, Teodosio's sister	contralto	Anna Girò
Varane, son of Isdegarde (King of Persia), also in love with Atenaide	contralto	Lisabetta Moro
Leontino	tenor	Annibal Pio Fabbri
Marziano, general of Teodosio, in love with Pulcheria	contralto	Anna Maria Faini
Probo, praetorian prefect, also in love with Pulcheria	tenor	Gaetano Baroni

== Recordings ==
- 2007: Sandrine Piau, Vivica Genaux, Guillemette Laurens, Romina Basso, Nathalie Stutzmann, Paul Agnew, Stefano Ferrari, Modo Antiquo, Federico Maria Sardelli. 3CDs Naïve Records
