= Orlando furioso (Vivaldi, 1727) =

Opera by Antonio Vivaldi (1727)

- Opera by Antonio Vivaldi
- Title page of the original libretto (1727)
- Librettist: Grazio Braccioli
- Premiere: November 1727; Teatro Sant'Angelo, Venice

Orlando (RV 728), usually known in modern times as Orlando furioso (Italian pronunciation: [orˈlando fuˈrjoːzo, -so]), is an opera in three acts by Antonio Vivaldi to an Italian libretto by Grazio Braccioli, based on Ludovico Ariosto's epic poem Orlando Furioso (The Frenzy of Orlando). The first performance of the opera was at the Teatro San Angelo, Venice, in November 1727. It is to be distinguished from an earlier Vivaldi opera of 1714, Orlando furioso, set to much the same libretto, once thought to be a revival of a 1713 opera by Giovanni Alberto Ristori but now considered by Vivaldian musicologists to be a fully-fledged opera by Vivaldi himself.

The opera – more formally, the dramma per musica – alternates arias with recitative, and is set on an island at an unspecified time. The story line combines several plot lines from Ariosto: the exploits of the hero Orlando are detailed, as well as the tale of the sorceress Alcina.

== Roles ==
Roles, voice types, premiere cast
Role	Voice type	Premiere cast November 1727
Orlando, a knight jealous of Medoro	contralto (en travesti)	Lucia Lancetti
Angelica, beloved of Medoro	soprano	Benedetta Serosina
Alcina, enchantress	contralto	Anna Girò
Bradamante, female warrior, beloved of Ruggiero	contralto	Maria Caterina Negri
Medoro, Prince betrothed to Angelica	contralto castrato	Casimiro Pignotti
Ruggiero, a knight following Orlando	contralto castrato	Giovanni Andrea Tassi
Astolfo	bass	Gaetano Pinetti

== Synopsis ==
=== Act 1 ===
In a delightful garden in which two springs are seen, Medoro escapes from a shipwreck into the arms of his beloved Angelica. Alcina magically helps Medoro and he recounts how he was first captured, then shipwrecked. Orlando is jealous of Medoro, but Angelica lies and says Medoro is her brother.

Alcina is attracted to the knight Ruggiero. She uses her magic to make him forget Bradamante and love her instead. Bradamante discovers Ruggiero's "betrayal." She shows him the ring he gave her therefore breaking Alcina's spell. Ruggiero feels guilty for his actions.

=== Act 2 ===
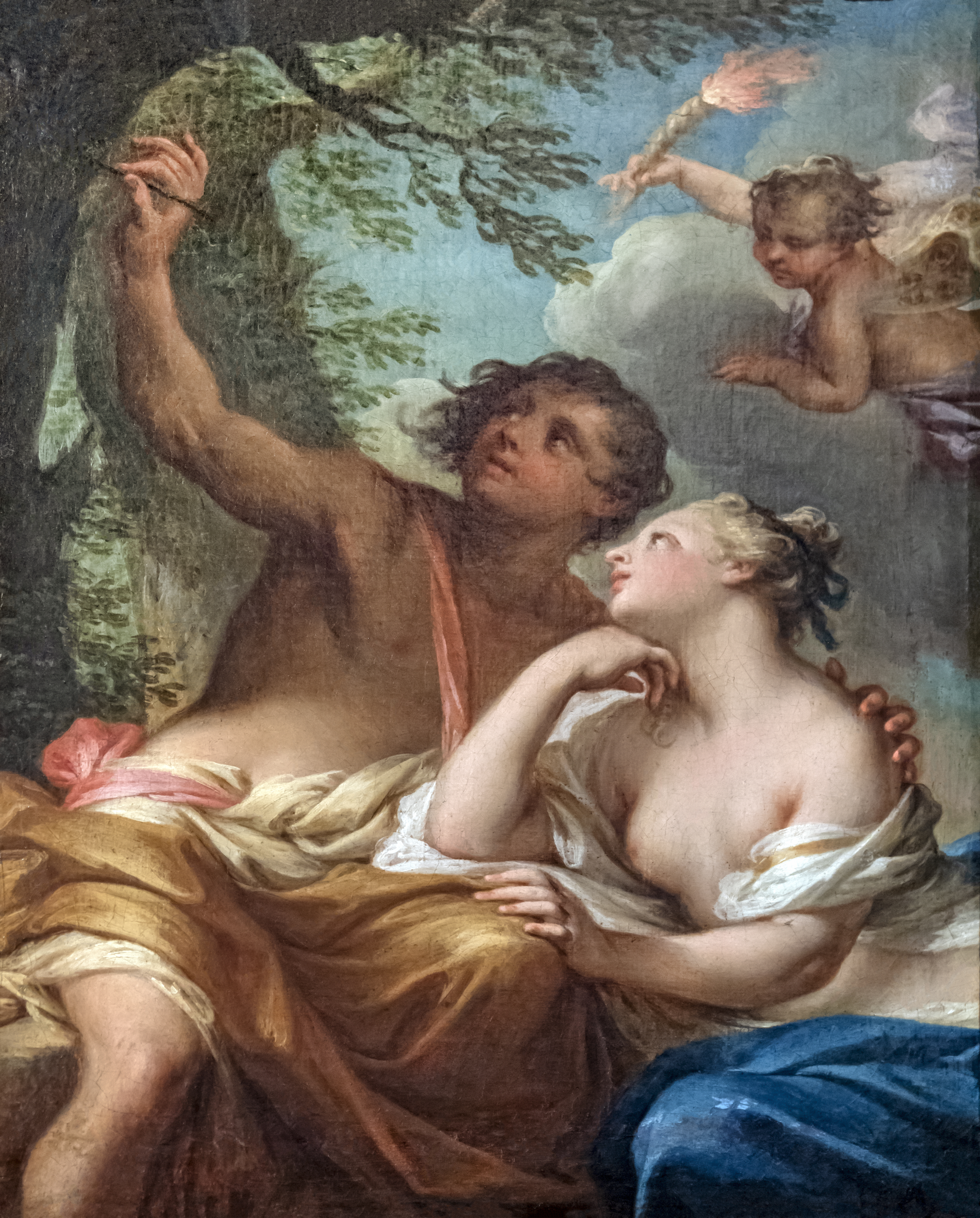
18th-century depiction of Angelica and Medoro

In a grove with green secluded spots, Astolfo reflects how he loves Alcina, but is tormented by her unfaithfulness.

Meanwhile, in a mountainous alpine region with a high, precipitous cliff, Angelica and Medoro swear their love and part ways. To rid herself of Orlando, Angelica sends him to fight a monster who guards —she claims— a vase containing an elixir of youth: the potion by which Medea revived the dying Aeson. In fact, she is just trying to lure him into an enchanted cavern from which Alcina's spell makes escape impossible. Orlando enters defying the monster and is trapped. Realizing Angelica's faithlessness, however, he digs his way out despite the spell.

Angelica and Medoro marry in a countryside at the foot of a hill. They carve their vows on a nearby tree. Orlando finds the tree, and on reading the inscription, becomes so furious that he starts destroying the trees.

=== Act 3 ===
The place is at the entrance hall before the temple of Hecate. Astolfo believes Orlando dead. With Ruggiero and Bradamante, he plots revenge against Alcina. The secret of Alcina's power lies in an urn with Merlin's ashes, which is locked in the temple of Hecate. They await Alcina's return.

Inside the temple of Hecate, Bradamante disguises herself as a man. Alcina falls in love with her. Orlando, still raving mad about the marriage of Angelica and Medoro, fights with the temple statues, inadvertently destroying Alcina's power.

On a deserted island. Alcina tries to attack the sleeping Orlando, but is prevented by Ruggiero and Bradamante. Astolfo returns to arrest Alcina. Orlando regains his reason and forgives Angelica and Medoro.

== Recordings ==
- 1978: Marilyn Horne, Victoria de los Ángeles, Lucia Valentini Terrani, Carmen Gonzales, Sesto Bruscantini, Nicola Zaccaria; I Solisti Veneti, Claudio Scimone; Erato
- 1990 (video recording): Marilyn Horne, Susan Patterson, Kathleen Kuhlmann, Sandra Walker, William Matteuzzi, Jeffrey Gall, Kevin Langan; Orchestra and Chorus of the San Francisco Opera, Randall Behr, production by Pier Luigi Pizzi; Pioneer Artists/Arthaus/Vision Video
- 2004: Marie-Nicole Lemieux, Jennifer Larmore, Veronica Cangemi, Ann Hallenberg, Philippe Jaroussky, Blandine Staskiewicz, Romina Basso, Lorenzo Regazzo; Ensemble Matheus; Jean-Christophe Spinosi; Naïve OP30393
- 2008: Anne Desler, Nicki Kennedy, Marianna De Liso, Luca Dordolo; Coro da Camera Italiano; Modo Antiquo, Federico Maria Sardelli. CPO
- 2011: Marie-Nicole Lemieux, Verónica Cangemi, Romina Basso, Jennifer Larmore, Philippe Jaroussky, Kristina Hammarström, Christian Senn; Chorus of the Théâtre des Champs-Élysées and Ensemble Matheus; Jean-Christophe Spinosi; Pierre Audi (director); DVD Naïve
