= Semiramide (Vivaldi) =

1731 opera by Antonio Vivaldi

- Dramma per musica by Antonio Vivaldi
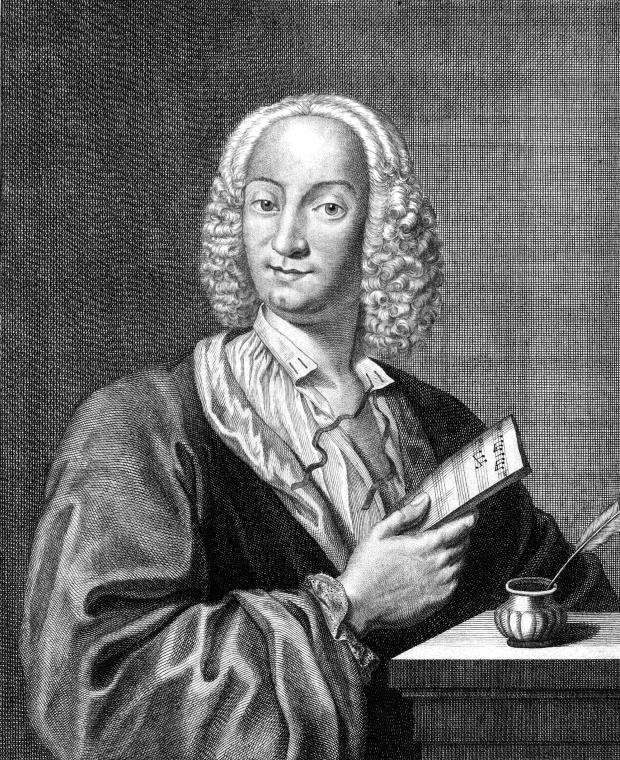
- Portrait of Vivaldi, 1725
- Librettist: Francesco Silvani
- Language: Italian
- Premiere: 26 December 1731; Archducal theatre in Mantua

Semiramide (RV 733) is a dramma per musica in three acts by Antonio Vivaldi composed to a libretto by Francesco Silvani.

It was his ultimate work at the archducal theatre in Mantua, where Vivaldi was maestro di cappella from 1718 until 1720. The production started the young castrato Mariano Nicolini in the role of Oronte as well as the famous "prima donna" Anna Girò in the role of Semiramide, with Maria Maddalena Pieri, famous for her breeches roles, as Nino. It was first performed on 26 December 1731 for the 1732 carnival season. Only the libretto and individual arias have survived.

The story of Semiramis was the subject of plays by Crébillon, Voltaire and Calderon de la Barca as well as of other operas by Porpora, Gluck, Rossini and dozens of other composers.
