= Bettina Hoffmann (artist) =

German artist

- Born: 1964 (age 61–62); Regensburg, Germany
- Website: bettinahoffmann.net

Bettina Hoffmann (born 1964) is a German-born artist who lives and works in Montreal, Quebec. Her work includes photography, video and performance.

== Career ==
Hoffmann grew up in West-Berlin and studied Fine Arts at the Hochschule der Künste (Berlin University of the Arts) in the class of Shinkichi Tajiri and Rebecca Horn (1985-1992). She attended as well the Rijksakademie van Beeldende Kunsten in Amsterdam (1987) and the California Institute of the Arts (1989–90) where she worked under the supervision of Krzysztof Wodiczko.

Her work is located at the intersection of photography, film, sculpture, contemporary dance and theatre. Bettina Hoffmann creates video tableaux and performances to facilitate the examination of the underlying mechanisms of social relations, conflicts and communication. Her work is centred on people and the human body; movements, subtle gestures, body language, distance and proximity, with an interest in ambiguous movements and actions that shift between violence and sensuality. She is developing her work through experimentation and in the process introduces rules that impose or limit a participant's use of specific body parts, which leads towards unusual, sometimes unsettling movements and situations. She is recognized for the use of unfamiliar camera perspectives and slow and steady camera movements.

Her work is included in the collections of the Musée d'art contemporain de Montréal., the Musée national des beaux-arts du Québec, the Museum of Contemporary Photography, Chicago, the Los Angeles County Museum of Art, Los Angeles, the Artothek Berlin of Der Neue Berliner Kunstverein (n.b.k.), Berlin, Germany and the Berlinische Galerie, Museum für Moderne Kunst.

== Selected publications ==
Bettina Hoffmann, Montréal & Québec : Dazibao-VU, coll. « Monographie », 2011, ISBN 978-2-921440-23-3

Spoilsport/Trouble-fête, Southern Alberta Art Gallery, Liane and Danny Taran Gallery, 2004, ISBN 1-894699-25-4
