= Nerone fatto Cesare =

Opera by Antonio Vivaldi

- Lost dramma per musica by Antonio Vivaldi
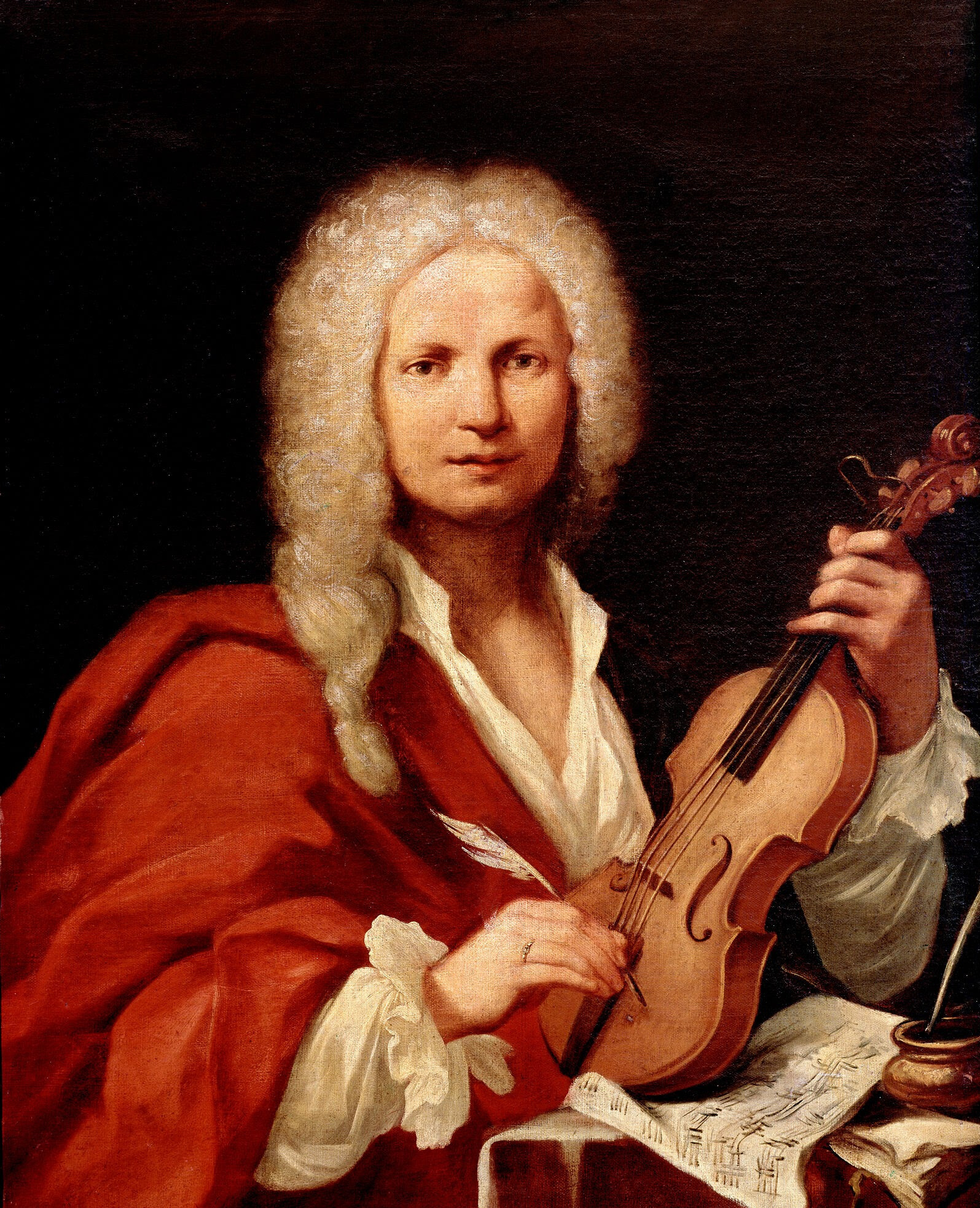
- Probable portrait of Antonio Vivaldi, c. 1723
- Language: Italian
- Premiere: 1715; Teatro Sant'Angelo, Venice

Nerone fatto Cesare is a lost dramma per musica by Antonio Vivaldi.

== Performance history ==
The opera was first performed at the Teatro Sant'Angelo in Venice during Carnival in 1715. It was revived (with many new arias) for the Accademia, Brescia, at the 1716 Carnival.

== Roles ==
Cast	Voice type	Premiere, 1715
Zelto		Florido Matteucci
Seneca	bass	Antonio Francesco Carli
Pallante, Minister	contralto castrato	Andrea Pacini
Ate, Freedwoman		Giovanna Ronzani
Gusmano, Ambassador	soprano castrato	Francesco Natali
Tigrane, King of Armenia	soprano (en travesti)	Elisabetta Denzio
Nerone, his son	contralto (en travesti)	Anna Maria Fabbri
Agrippina, Empress	soprano	Margherita Gualandi
