= Arsilda, regina di Ponto =

1716 opera by Antonio Vivaldi

- Dramma per musica by Antonio Vivaldi
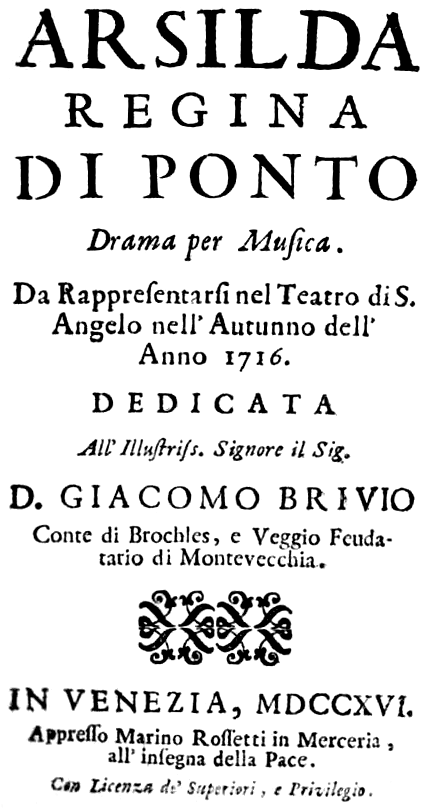
- Title page of the libretto, Venice 1716
- Librettist: Domenico Lalli
- Language: Italian
- Premiere: October 1716; Teatro Sant'Angelo, Venice

Arsilda, regina di Ponto is a dramma per musica by Antonio Vivaldi to a libretto by Domenico Lalli. The opera was first performed at the Teatro Sant'Angelo in Venice on 27 or 28 October 1716.

== Roles ==
Roles, voice types, premiere cast
Role	Voice type	Premiere cast, 1716
Arsilda, Queen of Pontos	mezzo-soprano	Anna Vincenza Dotti
Nicandro, noble from Bithynia	soprano (en travesti)	Antonia Pellizzari
Cisardo, Tamese's and Lisea's uncle	bass	Angelo Zannoni
Tamese, King of Cilicia	tenor	Annibale Pio Fabri
Barzane, Prince of Lydia	soprano castrato	Carlo Valcata
Mirinda, noble confidante of Lisea	soprano	Maria Teresa Cotti
Lisea, Tamese's sister, mistaken for her brother	mezzo-soprano	Anna Maria Fabbri

=== Plot ===
The plot was considered rather controversial at the time and led originally to censorship of the opera. It involves the title character falling in love with another woman dressed as a man.

== Recordings ==
- Singers: Simonetta Cavalli, Lucia Sciannimanico, Elena Cecchi Fedi, Nicky Kennedy, Joseph Cornwell, Sergio Foresti, Alessandra Rossi. Conductor: Federico Maria Sardelli. Orchestra: Modo Antiquo, Coro da Camera Italiano. Date: 15–24 July 2001. Issued: 2004. Label: CPO 999 740-2 3CD
- José Coca Loza, Vasilisa Berzhanskaya (mezzo-soprano), Benedetta Mazzucato, Marie Lys (soprano), Shira Patchornik, Nicolò Balducci, Leonardo Cortellazzi, La Cetra Basel, Andrea Marcon Naive 3CD 2025
