= Grazio Braccioli =

Italian jurist, poet and librettist

Grazio Braccioli (1682–1752) was an Italian jurist, poet and librettist. Born in Ferrara, he wrote 9 libretti for operas produced at the Teatro Sant'Angelo in Venice between 1711 and 1715. Among them were the libretti for Antonio Vivaldi's Orlando furioso and Orlando finto pazzo.

Braccioli was a doctor of civil and canon law, and lectured in both at the University of Ferrara. He was also a member of the Accademia degli Arcadi, for whom he wrote under the pseudonym "Nigello Preteo".
