= Orlando finto pazzo =

Opera by Antonio Vivaldi

- Dramma per musica by Antonio Vivaldi
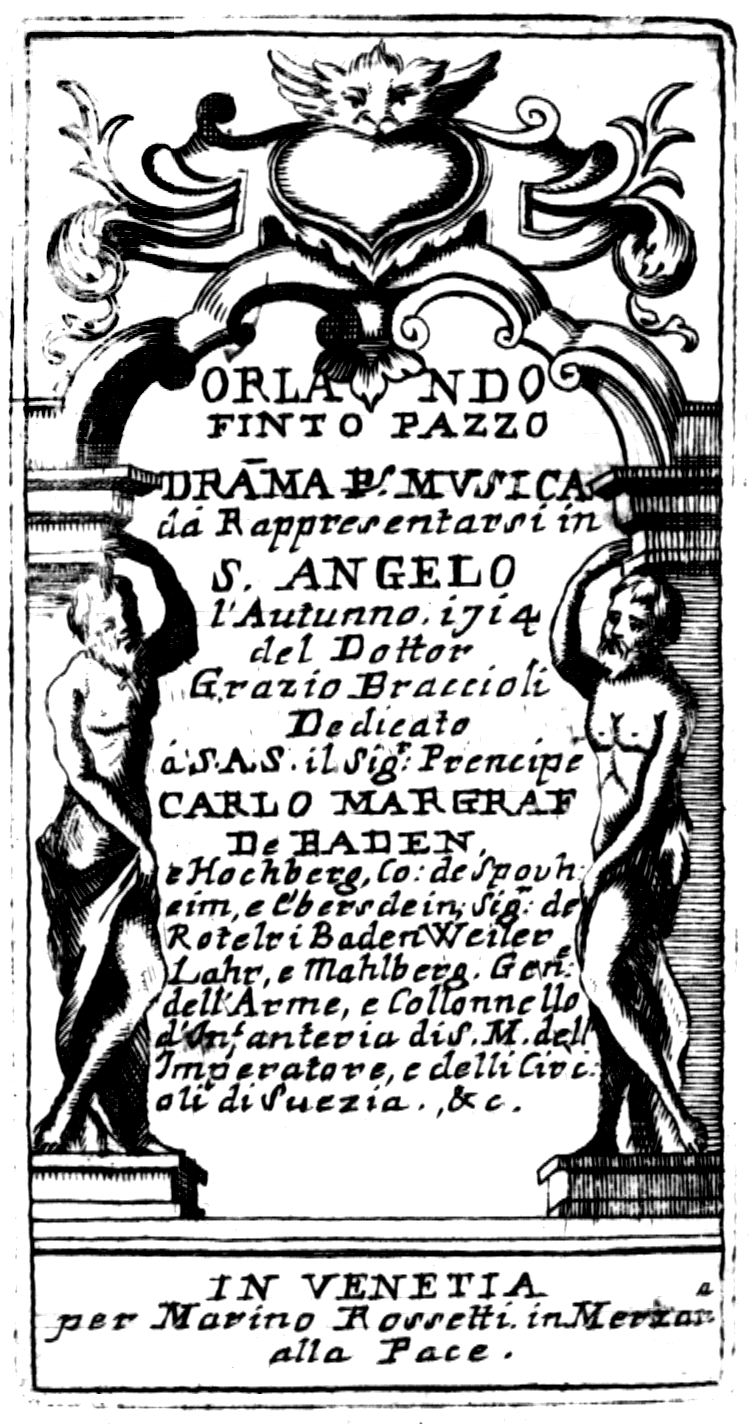
- Title page of the libretto
- Librettist: Grazio Braccioli
- Language: Italian
- Based on: Episode from Orlando Innamorato
- Premiere: November 1714; Teatro Sant'Angelo, Venice

Orlando finto pazzo (Italian pronunciation: [orˈlando ˈfinto ˈpattso]; Orlando, the Fake Madman) is an opera (dramma per musica) in three acts composed by Antonio Vivaldi to a libretto by Grazio Braccioli. The plot is based on an episode in Matteo Boiardo's unfinished epic poem Orlando Innamorato ([orˈlando innamoˈraːto]). The second of Vivaldi's known operas, Orlando finto pazzo premiered in November 1714 (dedication 10 November) at the Teatro Sant'Angelo in Venice. Vivaldi acted as impresario (in partnership with his father Giovanni Battista) as well as composer. Apparently the opera did not meet much approval from the audience and was billed only on few dates, just to be replaced, on 1 December, by a reworking of Giovanni Alberto Ristori's Orlando furioso ([orˈlando fuˈrjoːzo; -oːso]), an opera that the Vivaldi "impresa" had very successfully staged in 1713.

Orlando finto pazzo is listed as RV 727 in the Vivaldi catalogue.

== Roles ==
- Orlando, a knight in the service of Charlemagne, created by Antonio Francesco Carli (bass)
- Brandimarte, Orlando's friend, created by Andrea Guerri (soprano castrato)
- Ersilla, queen and sorceress, created by Margherita Gualandi, called "la Campioli" (soprano)
- Argillano, Ersilla's champion and secretly in love with her, created by Andrea Pacini (contralto castrato)
- Tigrinda, a priestess, in love with Argillano, created by Elisabetta Denzio (soprano)
- Grifone, secretly in love with Tigrinda, created by Francesco Natali (soprano castrato)
- Origille, in love with Grifone, created by Anna Maria Fabbri (contralto)

== Synopsis ==
=== Act 1 ===
Ersilla dedicates a sword to the destruction of Orlando, and entrusts the sword and mission to Argillano, who secretly loves her. Ersilla's enemies, Brandimarte, Grifone and Origille spy on the rituals. As the ceremony ends, Tigrinda, priestess of potions, tries unsuccessfully to tell Argillano she loves him. Grifone follows Tigrinda, who he in turn secretly loves. Argillano challenges Grifone, who is protected by Origille – she pretends that he is her young sister, “Leodilla.” Origille, who is pledged to Grifone, challenges his obvious love for Tigrinda, then vows her revenge. Orlando defeats but spares Argillano, leaving the magic sword on the ground as he severs the golden branch, thus opening the way for everyone into Ersilla's garden. Ersilla notices the sword, and infers Argillano's defeat. As her fairies bewitch Orlando with their songs, Ersilla becomes smitten with Brandimarte, who uses this to rescue Orlando.

=== Act 2 ===
Grifone tries to capitalise on his reluctant disguise to get closer to Tigrinda by becoming her handmaiden. Origille, now disguised as a man, “Ordauro,” interrupts them. Ersilla ignores Tigrinda's pleas for Argillano's release (imprisoned because of his defeat,) but now smitten with “Ordauro,” releases him at “Ordauro's” suggestion. Spurned by Ersilla, Argillano vows to betray her, and to gain an accomplice, falsely pledges his love to Tigrinda. On seeing Origille, Orlando blows his cover, but is neatly manoeuvred by Brandimarte into concealing his true identity by pretending to be mad, under the illusion that he is Orlando. Under cover of “madness,” Orlando tells the bizarre story of how Origille betrayed him last time they met. When Argillano disappears to warn Ersilla of his suspicions, Origille begs forgiveness, and Orlando acquiesces. Argillano tells Ersilla that “Leodilla” is Grifone, and she interrogates him. Grifone gives nothing away, and so is imprisoned.

=== Act 3 ===
Origille has smashed through Grifone's prison wall with a pickaxe, and confronts him with her ardent love. Grifone's pledges of love are rejected by Tigrinda, who then plots with a reluctant Argillano to poison Ersilla with a magic potion. Ersilla's darkest ceremony fails to reveal Orlando's true identity, so she conjures up a counterfeit Angelica to provoke him. Brandimarte again rescues Orlando, this time by pretending himself to be the warrior. Ersilla captures the two men, but is mortified to believe she loves her enemy. Orlando vows to abandon such deception in favour of honourable confrontation. Argillano rejects Tigrinda, who then drinks her own potion. Grief-stricken, Grifone, too poisons himself. Origille, seeing the corpse of her beloved, vows revenge. Orlando smashes his fetters, releases Brandimarte, and by destroying Ersilla's castle, breaks all her spells. Grifone, Tigrinda, and all her other victims reawaken and are cured, Tigrinda is united with Argillano, Origille with Grifone, and all ends happily.

== Recording ==
- Orlando finto pazzo (RV 727): Antonio Abete, Gemma Bertagnolli, Marina Comparato, Sonia Prina, Martin Oro, Marianna Pizzolato; Academia Montis Regalis, Alessandro De Marchi; Naïve OP30392
