= Teuzzone =

Opera by Antonio Vivaldi

- Opera by Antonio Vivaldi
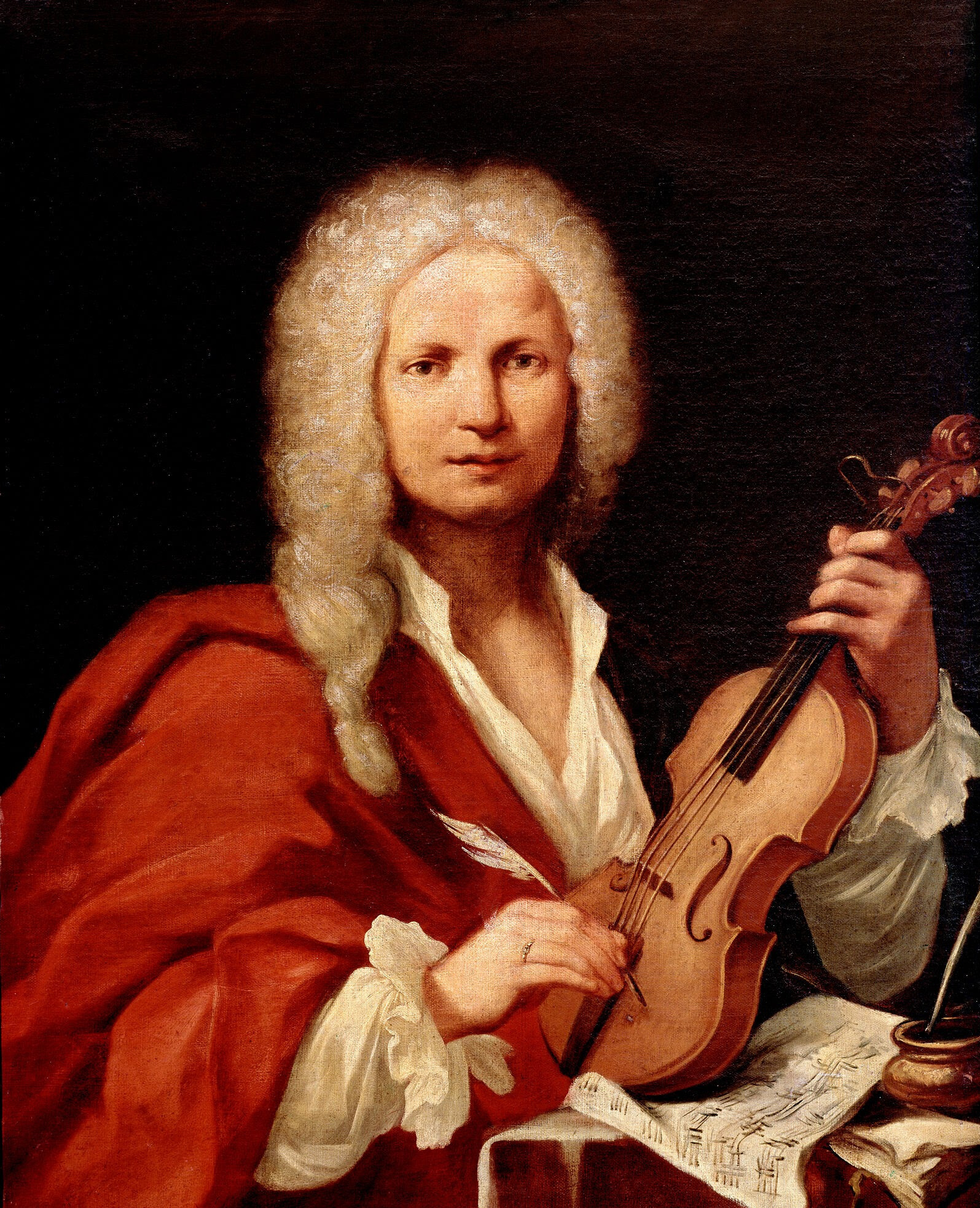
- Putative portrait of Antonio Vivaldi, c. 1723
- Librettist: Apostolo Zeno
- Language: Italian
- Premiere: 1719; Teatro Arciducale, Mantua

Teuzzone is the twelfth Italian opera composed by Antonio Vivaldi in 1719 to a libretto by Apostolo Zeno of 1706, which was first performed at the Teatro Arciducale in Mantua.

== Roles ==
Role	Voice type	Premiere Cast (Conductor: – )
Troncone, Emperor of China	tenor	Giuseppe Pederzoli
Teuzzone, his son, in love with and betrothed to Zelinda	soprano (en travesti)	Margherita Gualandi, "la Campioli"
Zidiana, bride but not wife of Troncone, secretly in love with Teuzzone	contralto	Anna Ambreville
Zelinda, Tartar princess, in love with Teuzzone	contralto	Teresa Mucci
Cino, governor of the realm, in love with Zidiana	soprano castrato	Gasparo Geri
Sivenio, a general of the realm, in love with Zidiana	bass	Francesco Benedetti
Egaro, captain of the guards, relative and confidant of Zidiana	contralto castrato	Lorenzo Beretta
Argonte, Tartar prince and confidant of Zelinda	tenor	Giuseppe Pederzoli
Chorus of soldiers, guards and people

== Synopsis ==
The plot concerns the aftermath of Troncone's death, where his wife Zidiana schemes with the governor Cino and the general Sivenio to seize power, even though Teuzzone is the rightful heir. Zelinda, the fiancée of Teuzzone, is a powerful woman in her own right and fights against this move, especially when it becomes clear that Zidiana's plan is to marry Teuzzone for herself.

== Recordings ==
Conductor: Sandro Volta. Orchestra dell'Opera Barocca di Guastalla. Singers: Pagano, Barazzoni, Bortolanei, Piccini, Lippi, Favari, Manzotti. Date: 1996. Issued: 1996.

Conductor: Jordi Savali. Le Concert des Nations. Singers: Lopez, Milanesi, Galou, Mameli, Zanasi, Giovannini, Sakurada. Label: Naive. Issued: 2011.
