= Tactus Records =

Casa Discografica Tactus
- Founded: 1986
- Founder: Serafino Rossi
- Genre: classical music
- Country of origin: Italy
- Location: Bologna
- Official website: www.tactus.it

Tactus Records (Italian Casa Discografica Tactus) is an Italian classical music recording label based in Bologna, Italy. It was founded in 1986 by a local businessman Serafino Rossi (1927-3 December 2009). The Province of Bologna held a concert in Serafino Rossi's memory in November 2010. The label focuses on Italian music.

Artists who made their early recordings on Tactus include Rinaldo Alessandrini, Filippo Maria Bressan as well Alessandro Baccini
