= Tito Manlio =

Opera by Antonio Vivaldi

- Opera by Antonio Vivaldi
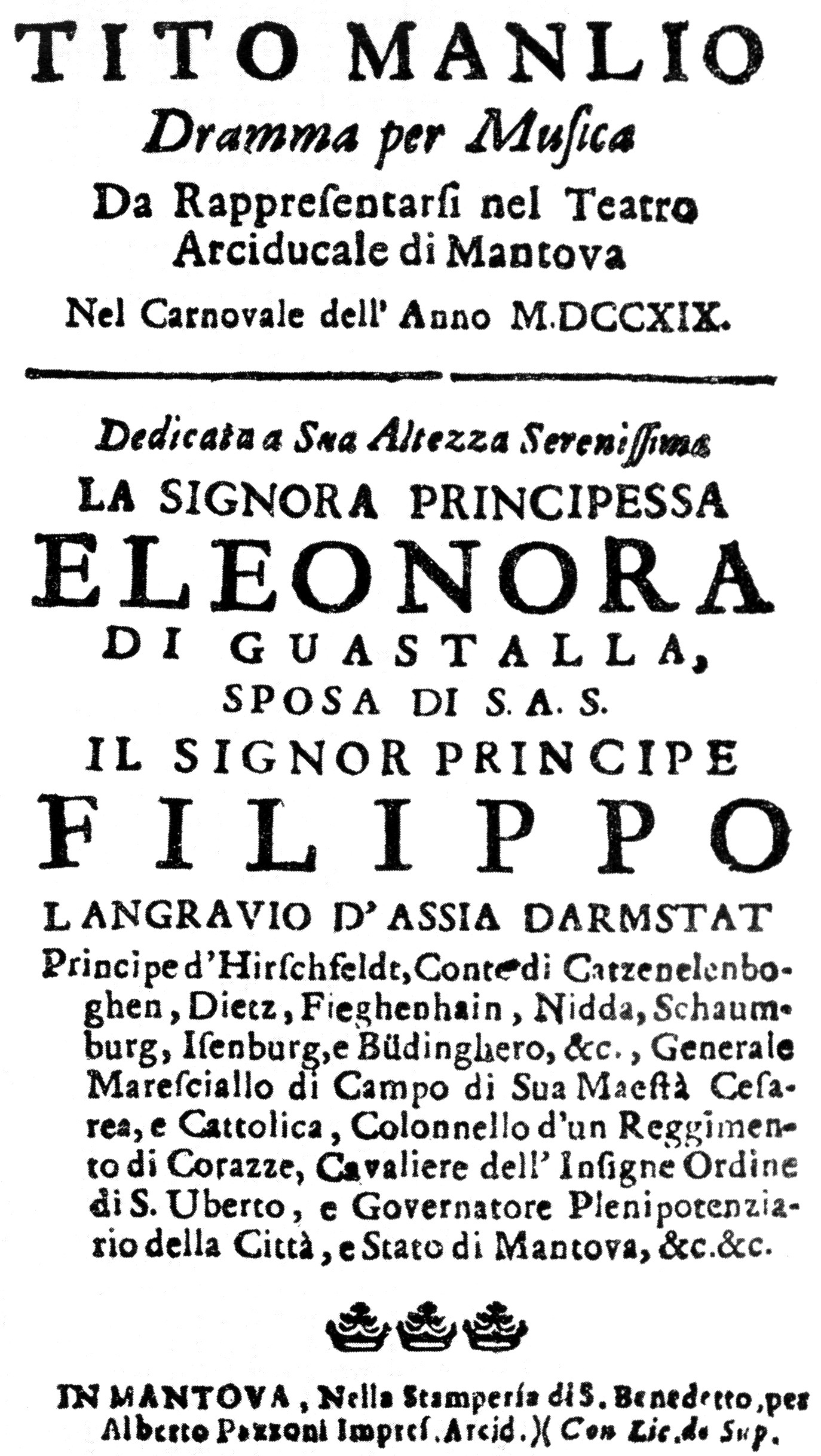
- Title page of 1719 libretto
- Librettist: Matteo Noris
- Language: Italian
- Premiere: 1719; Teatro Arciducale, Mantua

Tito Manlio (Italian pronunciation: [ˈtiːto ˈmanljo]; RV 738) is an opera (dramma per musica) in three acts by Antonio Vivaldi, to a libretto by Matteo Noris. It was written in celebration of the marriage of Philip of Hesse-Darmstadt (1671–1736), the governor of Mantua, which he had announced at Christmas. Vivaldi quickly composed the opera within five days. Whereas the wedding eventually did not take place at all, the opera was successfully premiered at the Teatro Arciducale ‘detto il Comico’ in Mantua during the carnival season of 1719.

== Roles ==
Role	Voice type	Premiere Cast, Carnival 1719
Tito Manlio, Consul of Rome	bass	Giovanni Francesco Benedetti
Manlio, Titus's son	soprano (en travesti)	Margherita Gualandi
Decio, Roman captain	contralto castrato	Lorenzo Beretta
Lucio, a knight	soprano castrato	Gasparo Geri
Vitellia, Titus's daughter	contralto	Teresa Mucci
Geminio, latin captain	tenor	Giuseppe Pederzoli
Servilia, Manlius's fiance	contralto	Anna Ambreville
Lindo, Tito's servant	bass	Giovanni Battista Calvi

== Synopsis ==
The opera is about the story of Titus Manlius Torquatus, consul of Rome and the conflict between him and the region of Latium.

== Recordings ==
• 1978 — Giancarlo Luccardi (Tito Manlio), Rose Wagemann (Manlio), Julia Hamari (Servilia), Birgit Finnilä (Vitellia), Margaret Marshall (Lucio), Domenico Trimarchi (Lindo), Norma Lerer (Decio), Claes H. Ahnsjö (Geminio) — Rundfunkchor Berlin, Berlin Chamber Orchestra, Vittorio Negri — 4 CD Philips Classics Records (recorded in 1978, remastered in 1990 on CD, it's regarded as the complete reference recording and was included in the Philips Vivaldi Edition)

• 2005 — Ottavio Dantone conducting the Academia Bizantina - 3 CD Naïve Records Recorded at the Beaune International Baroque opera festival
