= List of compositions by Antonio Vivaldi =

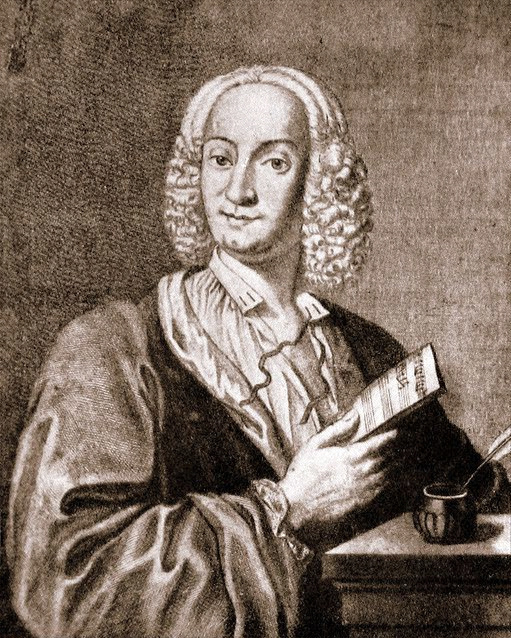
Antonio Vivaldi (engraving by François Morellon la Cave, from Michel-Charles Le Cène's edition of Vivaldi's Op. 8)

The following is a list of compositions by Antonio Vivaldi (1678–1741).

== Works with opus number ==
The following is a list of compositions by Vivaldi that were published during his lifetime and assigned an opus number. The more comprehensive RV numbering scheme was created in the 1970s.

Opus	Work	Date	RV
1	12 sonatas for two violins and basso continuo	1705	73, 67, 61, 66, 69, 62, 65, 64, 75, 78, 79, 63
2	12 sonatas for violin and basso continuo	1709	27, 31, 14, 20, 36, 1, 8, 23, 16, 21, 9, 32
3	L'estro armonico (The Harmonic Inspiration), 12 concertos for various combinations, of which the best known are No. 6 in A minor for violin, No. 8 in A minor for two violins and No. 10 in B minor for four violins	1711	549, 578, 310, 550, 519, 356, 567, 522, 230, 580, 565, 265
4	La stravaganza (The Eccentricity), 12 violin concertos	c. 1714	383a, 279, 301, 357, 347, 316a, 185, 249, 284, 196, 204, 298
5	Six sonatas, four violin sonatas and two sonatas for two violins and basso continuo	1716	18, 30, 33, 35, 76, 72
6	Six violin concertos	1716–1721	324, 259, 318, 216, 280, 239
7	12 concertos (two for oboe and 10 for violin), of which three are considered inauthentic: Nos. 1 and 7 (both in B♭ major) for oboe, and No. 9 (in the same key) for violin	1716–1717	465, 188, 326, 354, 285a, 374, 464, 299, 373, 294a, 208a, 214
8	Il cimento dell'armonia e dell'inventione (The Contest between Harmony and Invention), 12 violin concertos, which include the first four concertos known as Le quattro stagioni (The Four Seasons)	1723	269, 315, 293, 297, 253, 180, 242, 332, 236/454, 362, 210, 178/449
9	La cetra (The Lyre), 12 violin concertos, all for solo violin except for No. 9 in B♭ major which is for two violins	1727	181a, 345, 334, 263a, 358, 348, 359, 238, 530, 300, 198a, 391
10	Six flute concertos (a second version for recorder was printed in Venice)	c. 1728	433, 439, 428, 435, 434, 437
11	Five violin concertos, one oboe concerto, the second in E minor, RV 277, being known as Il favorito (The Favorite)	1729	207, 277, 336, 308, 202, 460
12	Five violin concertos and one without solo	1729	317, 244, 124, 173, 379, 361

=== Fictitious Opus 13 ===
An alleged "Opus 13", Il pastor fido (The Faithful Shepherd) was published in 1737 by Jean-Noël Marchand through a secret agreement with Nicolas Chédeville to publish a collection of Chédeville's compositions under Vivaldi's name. Chédeville supplied the funding and received the profits, all of which was documented in a notarial act by Marchand in 1749. The work includes six sonatas for musette (or vielle à roue) and basso continuo.

== Works by RV number ==
Most of Vivaldi's works do not have an opus number and so they are referred to by a catalog number such as the Ryom-Verzeichnis number.

=== Concertos, sinfonias, sonatas ===
Form	Instrumentation (All with basso continuo)	Key	RV	Notes
Concerto	Strings	C major	109	
Concerto	Strings	C major	110	
Concerto	Strings	C major	111	Related to the sinfonia for the opera Giustino, RV 717
Concerto	Strings	C major	113	
Concerto	Strings	C major	114	
Concerto	Strings	C major	115	Ripieno
Concerto	Strings	C major	117	Related to the serenata La Senna festeggiante, RV 693
Concerto	Strings	C minor	118	
Concerto	Strings	C minor	119	
Concerto	Strings	C minor	120	
Concerto	Strings	D major	121	
Concerto	Strings	D major	123	Final movement related to RV 579
Concerto	Strings	D major	124	Op. 12 No. 3
Concerto	Strings	D major	126	
Concerto	Strings	D major	786	Incomplete
Concerto	Strings	D minor	127	
Concerto	Strings	D minor	128	
Concerto	Strings	D minor	129	Madrigalesco
Concerto	Strings	E minor	133	
Concerto	Strings	E minor	134	Also listed as a sinfonia by Ryom
Concerto	Strings	F major	136	
Concerto	Strings	F major	138	
Concerto	Strings	F major	139	Related to RV 543
Concerto	Strings	F major	141	
Concerto	Strings	F major	142	
Concerto	Strings	F minor	143	
Concerto	Strings	G major	144	Inauthentic. "Introdutione" by Giuseppe Tartini
Concerto	Strings	G major	145	
Concerto	Strings	G major	150	
Concerto	Strings	G major	151	Alla rustica
Concerto	Strings	G minor	152	Ripieno; manuscript source Turin: Foa 30, BL 55–60
Concerto	Strings	G minor	153	Originale
Concerto	Strings	G minor	154	
Concerto	Strings	G minor	155	
Concerto	Strings	G minor	156	Related to RV 103
Concerto	Strings	G minor	157	
Concerto	Strings	A major	158	Ripieno; manuscript source Turin: Foa 30, BL 42–49
Concerto	Strings	A major	159	Related to 2 arias from the opera La verità in cimento, RV 739
Concerto	Strings	A major	160	
Concerto	Strings	A minor	161	
Concerto	Strings	B♭ major	163	Conca
Concerto	Strings	B♭ major	164	Concerto di Parigi
Concerto	Strings	B♭ major	165	
Concerto	Strings	B♭ major	166	
Concerto	Strings	B♭ major	167	
Concerto	Bassoon, strings	C major	466	
Concerto	Bassoon, strings	C major	467	
Concerto	Bassoon, strings	C major	468	Incomplete
Concerto	Bassoon, strings	C major	469	
Concerto	Bassoon, strings	C major	470	Related to RV 447 and RV 448
Concerto	Bassoon, strings	C major	471	Closely related to RV 450
Concerto	Bassoon, strings	C major	472	
Concerto	Bassoon, strings	C major	473	
Concerto	Bassoon, strings	C major	474	
Concerto	Bassoon, strings	C major	475	
Concerto	Bassoon, strings	C major	476	
Concerto	Bassoon, strings	C major	477	
Concerto	Bassoon, strings	C major	478	
Concerto	Bassoon, strings	C major	479	
Concerto	Bassoon, strings	C minor	480	
Concerto	Bassoon, strings	D minor	481	1st movement related to RV 406
Concerto	Bassoon, strings	D minor	482	Incomplete
Concerto	Bassoon, strings	E♭ major	483	
Concerto	Bassoon, strings	E minor	484	
Concerto	Bassoon, strings	F major	485	Related to RV 457
Concerto	Bassoon, strings	F major	486	
Concerto	Bassoon, strings	F major	487	Manuscript source Turin: Foa 32, BL 135–142
Concerto	Bassoon, strings	F major	488	
Concerto	Bassoon, strings	F major	489	
Concerto	Bassoon, strings	F major	490	
Concerto	Bassoon, strings	F major	491	
Concerto	Bassoon, strings	G major	492	
Concerto	Bassoon, strings	G major	493	
Concerto	Bassoon, strings	G major	494	
Concerto	Bassoon, strings	G minor	495	
Concerto	Bassoon, strings	G minor	496	Dedicated to the Marquis of Marzin (or "Morzin", "Morcin")
Concerto	Bassoon, strings	A minor	497	
Concerto	Bassoon, strings	A minor	498	
Concerto	Bassoon, strings	A minor	499	
Concerto	Bassoon, strings	A minor	500	
Concerto	Bassoon, strings	B♭ major	501	La notte
Concerto	Bassoon, strings	B♭ major	502	
Concerto	Bassoon, strings	B♭ major	503	
Concerto	Bassoon, strings	B♭ major	504	
Concerto	Cello, strings	C major	398	
Concerto	Cello, strings	C major	399	
Concerto	Cello, strings	C major	400	
Concerto	Cello, strings	C minor	401	
Concerto	Cello, strings	C minor	402	
Concerto	Cello, strings	D major	403	
Concerto	Cello, strings	D major	404	Inauthentic; withdrawn and moved to Anh. 145
Concerto	Cello, strings	D minor	405	
Concerto	Cello, strings	D minor	406	1st movement related to RV 481
Concerto	Cello, strings	D minor	407	
Concerto	Cello, strings	E♭ major	408	
Concerto	Cello, strings	E minor	787	Incomplete
Concerto	Cello, strings	F major	410	
Concerto	Cello, strings	F major	411	
Concerto	Cello, strings	F major	412	
Concerto	Cello, strings	G major	413	
Concerto	Cello, strings	G major	414	Related to RV 438
Concerto	Cello, strings	G major	415	Inauthentic; withdrawn and moved to Anh. 146
Concerto	Cello, strings	G minor	416	
Concerto	Cello, strings	G minor	417	
Concerto	Cello, strings	A minor	418	
Concerto	Cello, strings	A minor	419	
Concerto	Cello, strings	A minor	420	
Concerto	Cello, strings	A minor	421	
Concerto	Cello, strings	A minor	422	
Concerto	Cello, strings	B♭ major	423	
Concerto	Cello, strings	B♭ major	788	Incomplete
Concerto	Cello, strings	B minor	424	
Concerto	Cello, Bassoon, strings	E minor	409	
Concerto	2 cellos, strings	G minor	531	
Concerto	Concerto for 2 clarinets, 2 oboes, strings	C major	559	
Concerto	2 clarinets, 2 oboes, strings	C major	560	
Concerto	Flautino, strings	C major	443	
Concerto	Flautino, strings	C major	444	
Concerto	Flautino, strings	A minor	445	
Concerto	Flute, strings	D major	426	
Concerto	Flute, strings	D major	427	
Concerto	Flute, strings	D major	428	Op. 10 No. 3: Il gardellino (The Goldfinch). Closely related to RV 90
Concerto	Flute, strings	D major	429	
Concerto	Flute, strings	E minor	430	Closely related to RV 275a
Concerto	Flute, strings	E minor	431	Incomplete
Concerto	Flute, strings	D minor	431a	Il Gran Mogol
Concerto	Flute, strings	E minor	432	Incomplete
Concerto	Flute, strings	F major	433	Op. 10 No. 1: La tempesta di mare; closely related to RV 98 and RV 570
Concerto	Flute, strings	F major	434	Op. 10 No. 5. Closely related to RV 442
Concerto	Flute, strings	G major	435	Op. 10 No. 4. Published in Amsterdam by Michel-Charles Le Cène (#544)
Concerto	Flute, strings	G major	436	
Concerto	Flute, strings	G major	437	Op. 10 No. 6. Closely related to RV 101
Concerto	Flute, strings	G major	438	Related to RV 414
Concerto	Flute, strings	G minor	439	Op. 10 No. 2: La notte. Closely related to RV 104
Concerto	Flute, strings	A minor	440	
Concerto	Flute, strings	?	750	Four 'national' concertos, La Francia, La Spagna, L'Inghilterro, Il Gran Mogol, of which all but Il Gran Mogol, RV 431a, are lost (these are now catalogued separately: see RV 821, 822, 825).
Concerto	Flute, strings	D major	783	Composed in 1740, Discovered in 1990 by Ingo Gronefeld at Wissenschaftliche Allgemeinbibliothek in Schwerin.
Concerto	Flute, strings	G major	784	Lost
Concerto	Flute, strings	G major	805	Lost
Concerto	Flute, strings	?	821	La Francia. Lost. Formerly catalogued under RV 750.
Concerto	Flute, strings	?	822	L'Inghilterra. Lost. Formerly catalogued under RV 750.
Concerto	Flute, strings	?	823	L'Olanda. Lost. Formerly catalogued under RV 750.
Concerto	Flute, strings	?	824	La Germania. Lost. Formerly catalogued under RV 750.
Concerto	Flute, strings	?	825	La Spania. Lost. Formerly catalogued under RV 750.
Concerto	Flute, strings	?	826	L'Italia. Lost. Formerly catalogued under RV 750.
Concerto	Flute, 2 violins	D major	89	
Concerto	Flute, 2 violins	G major	102	
Concerto	Flute, oboe, violin, bassoon, strings	C major	88	
Concerto	Flute, oboe, violin, bassoon, strings	F major	98	Related to RV 433 and RV 570; all three works titled La tempesta di mare
Concerto	Flute, oboe, violin, bassoon, strings	F major	99	Related to RV 571
Concerto	Flute, oboe, violin, bassoon, strings	G minor	107	
Concerto	Flute, oboe, violin, bassoon, strings	F major	570	La tempesta di mare. Related to RV 98 and RV 433; violin in first movement only
Concerto	Flute, violin, bassoon (or 2 violins & cello)	G minor	106	
Concerto	Flute, violin, bassoon, strings	D major	91	
Concerto	Flute, violin, bassoon, strings	D minor	96	
Concerto	Flute, violin, bassoon, strings	F major	100	
Concerto	Flute, 2 violins, bassoon (or 3 violins & cello)	G minor	104	Closely related to RV 439, both titled La notte
Concerto	2 flutes, strings	C major	533	
Concerto	2 flutes, 2 oboes, violin, cello, harpsichord, strings	F major	572	Il Proteo, o il mondo al rovescio. Related to RV 544
Concerto	2 flutes, 2 violins, 2 bassoons, strings	D major	751	Lost
Concerto	Harpsichord, strings	A major	780	Related to RV 546
Concerto	2 horns, strings	F major	538	
Concerto	2 horns, strings	F major	539	
Concerto	Lute, 2 violins	D major	93	
Concerto	Mandolin, strings	C major	425	
Concerto	2 mandolins, strings	G major	532	
Concerto	Oboe, strings	C major	446	
Concerto	Oboe, strings	C major	447	Related to RV 448 and RV 470
Concerto	Oboe, strings	C major	448	Related to RV 447 and RV 470
Concerto	Oboe, strings	C major	449	Oboe version of RV 178 from Il cimento dell'armonia e dell'inventione, Op. 8 No. 12
Concerto	Oboe, strings	C major	450	Closely related to RV 471
Concerto	Oboe, strings	C major	451	
Concerto	Oboe, strings	C major	452	
Concerto	Oboe, strings	D major	453	
Concerto	Oboe, strings	D minor	454	Oboe version of RV 236 from Il cimento dell'armonia e dell'inventione, Op. 8 No. 9
Concerto	Oboe, strings	F major	455	
Concerto	Oboe, strings	F major	456	John Walsh #384
Concerto	Oboe, strings	F major	457	Closely related to RV 485
Concerto	Oboe, strings	F major	458	Inauthentic. Withdrawn and moved to Anh. 152.
Concerto	Oboe, strings	G minor	459	Incomplete
Concerto	Oboe, strings	G minor	460	Op.11 No. 6. Closely related to RV 334
Concerto	Oboe, strings	A minor	461	
Concerto	Oboe, strings	A minor	462	
Concerto	Oboe, strings	A minor	463	Related to RV 500
Concerto	Oboe, strings	B♭ major	464	Inauthentic; withdrawn and moved to Anh. 141
Concerto	Oboe, strings	B♭ major	465	Inauthentic; withdrawn and moved to Anh. 142
Concerto	Oboe, bassoon, strings	G major	545	
Concerto	Oboe, cello, strings	G minor	812	
Concerto	2 oboes, strings	C major	534	
Concerto	2 oboes, strings	D minor	535	
Concerto	2 oboes, strings	A minor	536	
Concerto	2 oboes, 2 horns, 2 bassoons, strings	F major	573	Lost
Concerto	Recorder, strings	C minor	441	
Concerto	Recorder, strings	F major	442	Closely related to RV 434
Concerto	Recorder, oboe, bassoon, strings	G minor	103	Related to RV 156 and RV 328
Concerto	Recorder, oboe, violin, bassoon	D major	94	
Concerto	Recorder, oboe, violin, bassoon	G major	101	Related to RV 437. Slow movement also used in RV 242.
Concerto	Recorder, oboe, violin, bassoon	G minor	105	
Concerto	Recorder, oboe, violin, bassoon (or 3 violins & cello)	D major	95	La pastorella
Concerto	Recorder, oboe, 2 violins	C major	87	
Concerto	Recorder, violin, bassoon (or cello)	D major	92	
Concerto	Recorder, 2 violins	A minor	108	
Concerto	2 trumpets, strings	C major	537	
Concerto	2 trumpets, strings	D major	781	Related to RV 563
Concerto	Viola d'amore, strings	D major	392	
Concerto	Viola d'amore, strings	D minor	393	
Concerto	Viola d'amore, strings	D minor	394	
Concerto	Viola d'amore, strings	D minor	395	
Concerto	Viola d'amore, strings	D minor	395a	
Concerto	Viola d'amore, strings	A major	396	Related to RV 744
Concerto	Viola d'amore, strings	A minor	397	
Concerto	Viola d'amore, lute, strings	D minor	540	
Concerto	Viola d'amore, 2 horns, 2 oboes, bassoon, strings	F major	97	
Concerto	Violin, strings	C major	170	Dresden concerto
Concerto	Violin, strings	C major	171	per S.M.C.C. (per Sua Maestà Cesarea Cattolica, for His Imperial Catholic Majesty)
Concerto	Violin, strings	C major	172	Dedicated to Pisendel
Concerto	Violin, strings	C major	173	Op. 12 No. 4
Concerto	Violin, strings	C major	174	Lost
Concerto	Violin, strings	C major	175	
Concerto	Violin, strings	C major	176	
Concerto	Violin, strings	C major	177	
Concerto	Violin, strings	C major	178	Il cimento dell'armonia e dell'inventione, Op. 8 No. 12
Concerto	Violin, strings	C major	179	
Concerto	Violin, strings	C major	179a	Different 3rd movement from RV 179; per Anna Maria
Concerto	Violin, strings	C major	180	Il piacere from Il cimento dell'armonia e dell'inventione, Op. 8 No. 6
Concerto	Violin, strings	C major	181	
Concerto	Violin, strings	C major	181a	La cetra, Op. 9 No. 1
Concerto	Violin, strings	C major	182	
Concerto	Violin, strings	C major	183	
Concerto	Violin, strings	C major	184	Dresden concerto
Concerto	Violin, strings	C major	185	La stravaganza, Op. 4 No. 7
Concerto	Violin, strings	C major	186	
Concerto	Violin, strings	C major	187	
Concerto	Violin, strings	C major	188	Op. 7 No. 2
Concerto	Violin, strings	C major	189	
Concerto	Violin, strings	C major	190	
Concerto	Violin, strings	C major	191	
Concerto	Violin, strings	C major	193	Lost
Concerto	Violin, strings	C major	194	
Concerto	Violin, strings	C major	195	Amsterdam concerto
Concerto	Violin, strings	C minor	196	La stravaganza, Op. 4 No. 10
Concerto	Violin, strings	C minor	197	
Concerto	Violin, strings	C minor	198	
Concerto	Violin, strings	C minor	198a	La cetra, Op. 9 No. 11
Concerto	Violin, strings	C minor	199	Il sospetto
Concerto	Violin, strings	C minor	200	Lost
Concerto	Violin, strings	C minor	201	
Concerto	Violin, strings	C minor	202	Op.11 No. 5
Concerto	Violin, strings	D major	203	Incomplete
Concerto	Violin, strings	D major	204	La stravaganza, Op. 4 No. 11
Concerto	Violin, strings	D major	205	Dedicated to Pisendel
Concerto	Violin, strings	D major	206	
Concerto	Violin, strings	D major	207	Op.11 No. 1
Concerto	Violin, strings	D major	208	Grosso Mogul – Bach BWV 594
Concerto	Violin, strings	D major	208a	Op. 7 No. 11
Concerto	Violin, strings	D major	209	
Concerto	Violin, strings	D major	210	Il cimento dell'armonia e dell'inventione, Op. 8 No. 11
Concerto	Violin, strings	D major	211	
Concerto	Violin, strings	D major	212	Fatto per la solennità della S. Lingua di S. Antonio in Padua
Concerto	Violin, strings	D major	212a	
Concerto	Violin, strings	D major	213	Dresden concerto
Concerto	Violin, strings	D major	213a	Different 3rd movement from RV 213; incomplete
Concerto	Violin, strings	D major	214	Op. 7 No. 12
Concerto	Violin, strings	D major	215	
Concerto	Violin, strings	D major	216	Op. 6 No. 4
Concerto	Violin, strings	D major	217	
Concerto	Violin, strings	D major	218	
Concerto	Violin, strings	D major	219	Dresden concerto
Concerto	Violin, strings	D major	220	Amsterdam concerto
Concerto	Violin in tromba marina, strings	D major	221	
Concerto	Violin, strings	D major	222	
Concerto	Violin, strings	D major	223	Closely related to RV 263a and RV 762
Concerto	Violin, strings	D major	224	Dresden concerto
Concerto	Violin, strings	D major	224a	Different 2nd movement from RV 224
Concerto	Violin, strings	D major	225	
Concerto	Violin, strings	D major	226	
Concerto	Violin, strings	D major	227	
Concerto	Violin, strings	D major	228	Dresden concerto
Concerto	Violin, strings	D major	229	
Concerto	Violin, strings	D major	230	L'estro armonico, Op. 3 No. 9. Bach BWV 972
Concerto	Violin, strings	D major	231	
Concerto	Violin, strings	D major	232	
Concerto	Violin, strings	D major	233	
Concerto	Violin, strings	D major	234	L'inquietudine
Concerto	Violin, strings	D minor	235	
Concerto	Violin, strings	D minor	236	Il cimento dell'armonia e dell'inventione, Op. 8 No. 9. Closely related to RV 454
Concerto	Violin, strings	D minor	237	Dedicated to Pisendel
Concerto	Violin, strings	D minor	238	La cetra, Op. 9 No. 8
Concerto	Violin, strings	D minor	239	Op. 6 No. 6
Concerto	Violin, strings	D minor	240	Dresden concerto
Concerto	Violin, strings	D minor	241	Dresden concerto
Concerto	Violin, strings	D minor	242	Il cimento dell'armonia e dell'inventione, Op. 8 No. 7; dedicated to Pisendel. Slow movement also used in RV 101.
Concerto	Violin, strings	D minor	243	"con violino senza cantin" (for violin without an E string); with scordatura
Concerto	Violin, strings	D minor	244	Op. 12 No. 2
Concerto	Violin, strings	D minor	245	Dresden concerto
Concerto	Violin, strings	D minor	246	
Concerto	Violin, strings	D minor	247	
Concerto	Violin, strings	D minor	248	per Anna Maria della Pietà
Concerto	Violin, strings	D minor	249	La stravaganza, Op. 4 No. 8
Concerto	Violin, strings	E♭ major	250	
Concerto	Violin, strings	E♭ major	251	
Concerto	Violin, strings	E♭ major	252	
Concerto	Violin, strings	E♭ major	253	La tempesta di mare from Il cimento dell'armonia e dell'inventione, Op. 8 No. 5
Concerto	Violin, strings	E♭ major	254	
Concerto	Violin, strings	E♭ major	255	Lost
Concerto	Violin, strings	E♭ major	256	Il ritiro
Concerto	Violin, strings	E♭ major	257	
Concerto	Violin, strings	E♭ major	258	
Concerto	Violin, strings	E♭ major	259	Op. 6 No. 2
Concerto	Violin, strings	E♭ major	260	Dresden concerto
Concerto	Violin, strings	E♭ major	261	
Concerto	Violin, strings	E♭ major	262	Dresden concerto
Concerto	Violin, strings	E major	263	
Concerto	Violin, strings	E major	263a	La cetra, Op. 9 No. 4
Concerto	Violin, strings	E major	264	
Concerto	Violin, strings	E major	265	L'estro armonico, Op. 3 No. 12. Bach BWV 976
Concerto	Violin, strings	E major	266	
Concerto	Violin, strings	E major	267	Dresden concerto
Concerto	Violin, strings	E major	267a	
Concerto	Violin, strings	E major	268	
Concerto	Violin, strings	E major	269	"Spring" from Il cimento dell'armonia e dell'inventione, Op. 8 No. 1 / Le quattro stagioni
Concerto	Violin, strings	E major	270	Il riposo – Per il Santissimo Natale
Concerto	Violin, strings	E major	270a	Different 2nd movement from RV 270; incomplete
Concerto	Violin, strings	E major	271	L' amoroso
Concerto	Violin, strings	E minor	272	By Johann Adolph Hasse; withdrawn and moved to Anh. 64 & 64a
Concerto	Violin, strings	E minor	273	
Concerto	Violin, strings	E minor	274	
Concerto	Violin, strings	E minor	275	
Concerto	Violin, strings	E minor	275a	Related to RV 430
Concerto	Violin, strings	E minor	276	
Concerto	Violin, strings	E minor	277	Op.11 No. 2: Il favorito
Concerto	Violin, strings	E minor	278	
Concerto	Violin, strings	E minor	279	La stravaganza, Op. 4 No. 2
Concerto	Violin, strings	E minor	280	Op. 6 No. 5
Concerto	Violin, strings	E minor	281	
Concerto	Violin, strings	F major	282	
Concerto	Violin, strings	F major	283	
Concerto	Violin, strings	F major	284	La stravaganza, Op. 4 No. 9
Concerto	Violin, strings	F major	285	Dresden concerto
Concerto	Violin, strings	F major	285a	Op. 7 No. 5
Concerto	Violin, strings	F major	286	Per la solennità di S. Lorenzo
Concerto	Violin, strings	F major	287	
Concerto	Violin, strings	F major	288	
Concerto	Violin, strings	F major	289	
Concerto	Violin, strings	F major	290	Lost
Concerto	Violin, strings	F major	291	Walsh #6 of his Op. 4
Concerto	Violin, strings	F major	292	Dresden concerto
Concerto	Violin, strings	F major	293	"Autumn" from Il cimento dell'armonia e dell'inventione, Op. 8 No. 3 / Le quattro stagioni
Concerto	Violin, strings	F major	294	Il ritiro
Concerto	Violin, strings	F major	294a	
Concerto	Violin, strings	F major	295	
Concerto	Violin, strings	F major	296	
Concerto	Violin, strings	F major	794	Incomplete
Concerto	Violin, strings	F minor	297	"Winter" from Il cimento dell'armonia e dell'inventione, Op. 8 No. 4 / Le quattro stagioni
Concerto	Violin, strings	G major	298	La stravaganza, Op. 4 No. 12
Concerto	Violin, strings	G major	299	Op. 7 No. 8. Bach BWV 973
Concerto	Violin, strings	G major	300	La cetra, Op. 9 No. 10
Concerto	Violin, strings	G major	301	La stravaganza, Op. 4 No. 3
Concerto	Violin, strings	G major	302	
Concerto	Violin, strings	G major	303	
Concerto	Violin, strings	G major	304	Lost
Concerto	Violin, strings	G major	305	Lost
Concerto	Violin, strings	G major	306	
Concerto	Violin, strings	G major	307	
Concerto	Violin, strings	G major	308	Op.11 No. 4
Concerto	Violin, strings	G major	309	Il mare tempestoso; lost
Concerto	Violin, strings	G major	310	L'estro armonico, Op. 3 No. 3. Bach BWV 978
Concerto	Violin in tromba marina, strings	G major	311	
Concerto	Violin, strings	G major	312	Also for recorder
Concerto	Violin in tromba marina, strings	G major	313	
Concerto	Violin, strings	G major	314	Dedicated to Pisendel. Related to RV 17a
Concerto	Violin, strings	G major	314a	Dresden concerto
Concerto	Violin, strings	G minor	315	"Summer" from Il cimento dell'armonia e dell'inventione, Op. 8 No. 2 / Le quattro stagioni
Concerto	Violin, strings	G minor	316	Lost; Bach BWV 975
Concerto	Violin, strings	G minor	316a	La stravaganza, Op. 4 No. 6
Concerto	Violin, strings	G minor	317	Op. 12 No. 1. Appears in Suzuki Violin School book 5
Concerto	Violin, strings	G minor	318	Op. 6 No. 3
Concerto	Violin, strings	G minor	319	Dresden concerto
Concerto	Violin, strings	G minor	320	Incomplete
Concerto	Violin, strings	G minor	321	
Concerto	Violin, strings	G minor	322	Incomplete
Concerto	Violin, strings	G minor	323	Dresden concerto
Concerto	Violin, strings	G minor	324	Op. 6 No. 1
Concerto	Violin, strings	G minor	325	
Concerto	Violin, strings	G minor	326	Op. 7 No. 3
Concerto	Violin, strings	G minor	327	
Concerto	Violin, strings	G minor	328	Dedicated to Pisendel
Concerto	Violin, strings	G minor	329	Dresden concerto
Concerto	Violin, strings	G minor	330	
Concerto	Violin, strings	G minor	331	
Concerto	Violin, strings	G minor	332	Il cimento dell'armonia e dell'inventione, Op. 8 No. 8
Concerto	Violin, strings	G minor	333	
Concerto	Violin, strings	G minor	334	La cetra, Op. 9 No. 3. Closely related to RV 460
Concerto	Violin, strings	A major	335	Walsh #435. The Cuckow or Il Cucù. Related to RV 518
Concerto	Violin, strings	A major	335a	Il rosignuolo; also for recorder
Concerto	Violin, strings	A major	336	Op.11 No. 3
Concerto	Violin, strings	A major	337	Lost
Concerto	Violin, strings	A major	338	Walsh #454 attributed to Joseph Meck withdrawn by Ryom and assigned to Anh. 65.
Concerto	Violin, strings	A major	339	
Concerto	Violin, strings	A major	340	Dedicated to Pisendel
Concerto	Violin, strings	A major	341	Dresden concerto
Concerto	Violin, strings	A major	342	
Concerto	Violin, strings	A major	343	Scordatura violin
Concerto	Violin, strings	A major	344	Dresden concerto
Concerto	Violin, strings	A major	345	La cetra, Op. 9 No. 2
Concerto	Violin, strings	A major	346	
Concerto	Violin, strings	A major	347	La stravaganza, Op. 4 No. 5
Concerto	Violin, strings	A major	348	La cetra, Op. 9 No. 6. Scordatura violin
Concerto	Violin, strings	A major	349	per Anna Maria
Concerto	Violin, strings	A major	350	
Concerto	Violin, strings	A major	351	Lost
Concerto	Violin, strings	A major	352	
Concerto	Violin, strings	A major	353	
Concerto	Violin, strings	A major	792	Incomplete
Concerto	Violin, strings	A minor	354	Op. 7 No. 4
Concerto	Violin, strings	A minor	355	
Concerto	Violin, strings	A minor	356	L'estro armonico, Op. 3 No. 6
Concerto	Violin, strings	A minor	357	La stravaganza, Op. 4 No. 4
Concerto	Violin, strings	A minor	358	La cetra, Op. 9 No. 5
Concerto	Violin, strings	B♭ major	359	La cetra, Op. 9 No. 7
Concerto	Violin, strings	B♭ major	360	Incomplete
Concerto	Violin, strings	B♭ major	361	Op. 12 No. 6
Concerto	Violin, strings	B♭ major	362	La caccia from Il cimento dell'armonia e dell'inventione, Op. 8 No. 10
Concerto	Violin, strings	B♭ major	363	Il cornetto da posta, Dresden concerto
Concerto	Violin, strings	B♭ major	364	
Concerto	Violin, strings	B♭ major	364a	Different 2nd movement from RV 364; listed by Mme Boivin and Le Clerc
Concerto	Violin, strings	B♭ major	365	
Concerto	Violin, strings	B♭ major	366	Il Carbonelli, Dresden concerto
Concerto	Violin, strings	B♭ major	367	Brno Concerto
Concerto	Violin, strings	B♭ major	368	
Concerto	Violin, strings	B♭ major	369	
Concerto	Violin, strings	B♭ major	370	Dedicated to Pisendel
Concerto	Violin, strings	B♭ major	371	
Concerto	Violin, strings	B♭ major	372	per Signora Chiara
Concerto	Violin, strings	B♭ major	372a	Formerly RV 790; incomplete
Concerto	Violin, strings	B♭ major	373	Inauthentic. Withdrawn and moved to Anh. 153.
Concerto	Violin, strings	B♭ major	374	Op. 7 No. 6
Concerto	Violin, strings	B♭ major	375	
Concerto	Violin, strings	B♭ major	376	
Concerto	Violin, strings	B♭ major	377	
Concerto	Violin, strings	B♭ major	378	Incomplete
Concerto	Violin, strings	B♭ major	379	Op. 12 No. 5
Concerto	Violin, strings	B♭ major	380	
Concerto	Violin, strings	B♭ major	381	Closely related to RV 528 and RV 383a. Bach BWV 980
Concerto	Violin, strings	B♭ major	382	
Concerto	Violin, strings	B♭ major	383	Dresden concerto
Concerto	Violin, strings	B♭ major	383a	La stravaganza, Op. 4 No. 1. Related to RV 381, RV 383 and RV 528
Concerto	Violin, strings	B minor	384	Dresden concerto
Concerto	Violin, strings	B minor	385	Withdrawn and moved to Anh. 108
Concerto	Violin, strings	B minor	386	
Concerto	Violin, strings	B minor	387	per Signora Anna Maria
Concerto	Violin, strings	B minor	388	Dresden concerto
Concerto	Violin, strings	B minor	389	
Concerto	Violin, strings	B minor	390	
Concerto	Violin, strings	B minor	391	La cetra, Op. 9 No. 12. Scordatura violin
Concerto	Violin, strings	D major	742	Fragment
Concerto	Violin, strings	F minor	743	Lost – mentioned in Vivaldi's autograph thematic catalog
Concerto	Violin, strings	A major	744	Fragment, end of first and second movements only
Concerto	Violin, strings	B♭ major	745	Fragment; third movement only
Concerto	Violin, strings	D major	752	Lost
Concerto	Violin, strings	C minor	761	Related to RV 201
Concerto	Violin, strings	E major	762	Related to RV 223
Concerto	Violin, strings	A major	763	L'ottavina
Concerto	Violin, strings	A major	768	Related to RV 396
Concerto	Violin, strings	D minor	769	Related to RV 393
Concerto	Violin, strings	D minor	770	Related to RV 395a
Concerto	Violin, strings	C minor	771	Incomplete
Concerto	Violin, strings	D major	772	Incomplete
Concerto	Violin, strings	F major	773	Incomplete
Concerto	Violin, strings	D minor	813	Formerly Anh. 10, now authenticated; Bach BWV 979
Concerto	Violin, strings	A major	817	Formerly Anh. 86, now authenticated
Concerto	Violin, strings	D major	818	Formerly Anh. 72, now authenticated; incomplete
Concerto	Violin, double string orchestra	C major	581	"Per la Santissima Assuzione di Maria Vergine"
Concerto	Violin, double string orchestra	D major	582	"Per la Santissima Assuzione di Maria Vergine" Related to RV 581
Concerto	Violin, double string orchestra	B♭ major	583	Scordatura violin
Concerto	Violin, double string orchestra	C major	793	Incomplete
Concerto	Violin, cello, strings	A major	546	Cello all'Inglese (very small cello). Related to RV 780
Concerto	Violin, cello, strings	F major	544	Il Proteo o sia il mondo al rovescio. Related to RV 572
Concerto	Violin, cello, strings	B♭ major	547	
Concerto	Violin, cello, strings	G major	814	Formerly Anh. 87, now authenticated; incomplete
Concerto	Violin, 2 cellos, strings	C major	561	
Concerto	Violin, oboe, strings	F major	543	Related to RV 139
Concerto	Violin, oboe, strings	B♭ major	548	
Concerto	Violin, 2 recorders, 3 oboes, bassoon, strings	G minor	576	Dedicated to the Prince Elector of Saxony
Concerto	Violin, oboe, chalumeau, 3 viole all'inglese, strings	B♭ major	579	Concerto funebre. Final movement related to RV 123.
Concerto	Violin, 2 oboes, strings	D major	563	
Concerto	Violin, 2 oboes, 2 horns, bassoon, cello, strings	F major	569	Cello in 3rd movement only
Concerto	Violin, 2 oboes, 2 horns, bassoon, strings	F major	568	
Concerto	Violin, 2 oboes, 2 horns, cello, bassoon, strings	F major	571	Related to RV 99
Concerto	Violin, 2 oboes, 2 horns, strings	D major	562	Different 2nd movement from RV 562a
Concerto	Violin, 2 oboes, 2 horns, timpani, strings	D major	562a	Amsterdam concerto
Concerto	Violin, 2 oboes, 2 recorders, bassoon, strings	G minor	577	For the orchestra at Dresden
Concerto	Violin, organ, strings	D minor	541	
Concerto	Violin, organ, strings	F major	542	Doubtful
Concerto	Violin, organ, strings	C minor	766	Related to RV 510
Concerto	Violin, organ, strings	F major	767	Related to RV 765
Concerto	Violin, organ, strings	C major	774	Incomplete
Concerto	Violin, organ, strings	F major	775	Incomplete
Concerto	Violin, organ, strings	C major	808	per Signora Anna Maria
Concerto	Violin, organ (or violin), oboe (or cello), strings	C major	554	
Concerto	Violin, 2 corni da caccia (horn), 2 oboes, bassoon, strings	F major	574	Dedicated to Pisendel
Concerto	2 violins, strings	C major	505	
Concerto	2 violins, strings	C major	506	
Concerto	2 violins, strings	C major	507	
Concerto	2 violins, strings	C major	508	
Concerto	2 violins, strings	C minor	509	
Concerto	2 violins, strings	C minor	510	Related to RV 766
Concerto	2 violins, strings	D major	511	
Concerto	2 violins, strings	D major	512	
Concerto	2 violins, strings	D major	513	Gerhard Frederik Witvogel #48
Concerto	2 violins, strings	D minor	514	
Concerto	2 violins, strings	E♭ major	515	
Concerto	2 violins, strings	G major	516	
Concerto	2 violins, strings	G minor	517	
Concerto	2 violins, strings	A major	518	Arrangement of RV 335 by Johan Helmich Roman
Concerto	2 violins, strings	A major	519	L'estro armonico, Op. 3 No. 5
Concerto	2 violins, strings	A major	520	Incomplete
Concerto	2 violins, strings	A major	521	
Concerto	2 violins, strings	A minor	522	L'estro armonico, Op. 3 No. 8. Bach BWV 593
Concerto	2 violins, strings	A minor	523	
Concerto	2 violins, strings	B♭ major	524	
Concerto	2 violins, strings	B♭ major	525	
Concerto	2 violins, strings	B♭ major	526	Incomplete
Concerto	2 violins, strings	B♭ major	527	
Concerto	2 violins, strings	B♭ major	528	Related to RV 381 and RV 383a
Concerto	2 violins, strings	B♭ major	529	
Concerto	2 violins, strings	B♭ major	530	La cetra, Op. 9 No. 9
Concerto	2 violins, strings	B♭ major	764	Related to RV 548
Concerto	2 violins, strings	F major	765	Related to RV 767
Concerto	2 violins, cello, strings	D minor	565	L'estro armonico, Op. 3 No. 11. Bach BWV 596
Concerto	2 violins, cello, strings	G minor	578	L'estro armonico, Op. 3 No. 2
Concerto	2 violins, cello, strings	G minor	578a	Original version of RV 578
Concerto	2 violins, 2 cellos, strings	D major	564	
Concerto	2 violins, 2 oboes, bassoon, strings	D major	564a	Anonymous version of RV 564
Concerto	2 violins, 2 cellos, strings	G major	575	
Concerto	2 violins, 2 oboes, bassoon, strings	C major	557	
Concerto	2 violins, 2 organs, double string orchestra	F major	584	Incomplete; one violin and organ as soloists in each orchestra
Concerto	2 violins, 2 recorders, 2 oboes, bassoon, strings	D minor	566	
Concerto	2 violins, 2 recorders, 2 oboes, 2 clarinets, bassoon, strings	C major	556	Per la solennità di S. Lorenzo
Concerto	2 violins in tromba marina, 2 recorders, 2 trumpets, 2 mandolines, 2 chalumeaux, 2 theorboes, cello, strings	C major	558	"con molti istromenti" ("with many instruments")
Concerto	3 violins, strings	F major	551	
Concerto	Flute, oboe, violin, bassoon (or 3 violins, cello)	D major	90	Closely related to RV 428, both titled Il gardellino
Concerto	3 violins, oboe, 2 recorders, 2 viole all'inglese, chalumeau, 2 cellos, 2 harpsichords, 2 trumpets, strings	C major	555	2 trumpets in third movement only
Concerto	4 violins, strings	D major	549	L'estro armonico, Op. 3 No. 1
Concerto	4 violins, strings	E minor	550	L'estro armonico, Op. 3 No. 4
Concerto	4 violins, strings	B♭ major	553	
Concerto	Violin (echo), 2 violins, strings	A major	552	"con violino principale con altro per eco in lontano" ("with a solo violin and a violin in distant echo")
Concerto	4 violins, cello, strings	F major	567	L'estro armonico, Op. 3 No. 7
Concerto	4 violins, cello, strings	B minor	580	L'estro armonico, Op. 3 No. 10; Bach BWV 1065
Concerto	4 violins, 4 recorders, 3 cellos, organ, double string orchestra	A major	585	2 violins & 2 recorders as soloists in the first orchestra (with cello in the third movement); 2 violins & 2 recorders as soloists in the second orchestra (with cello & organ in the third movement); basso continuo in the second movement assigned to theorbo or organ
Sinfonia	Strings	C major	111a	Different second movement from RV 111 and related to the sinfonia from the opera Giustino, RV 717
Sinfonia	Strings	C major	112	
Sinfonia	Strings	C major	116	Inauthentic. Withdrawn and moved to Anh. 144
Sinfonia	Strings	C major	802	Improvvisata
Sinfonia	Strings	D major	122	
Sinfonia	Strings	D major	125	Incomplete
Sinfonia	Strings	E major	131	
Sinfonia	Strings	E major	132	Inauthentic. Composed by Johann Gottlieb Janitsch
Sinfonia	Strings	F major	135	
Sinfonia	Strings	F major	137	
Sinfonia	Strings	F major	140	Also listed as a concerto by Ryom
Sinfonia	Strings (or 3 violins)	G major	146	Also listed as a concerto by Ryom; in Breitkopf catalog under Johann Georg Roellig
Sinfonia	Strings	G major	147	
Sinfonia	Strings	G major	148	Inauthentic; later moved to Anh. 68 by Ryom; composed by Domenico Gallo
Sinfonia	Strings	G major	149	
Sinfonia	Strings	B♭ major	162	
Sinfonia	Strings	B minor	168	
Sinfonia	2 violins, viola, double bass	B minor	169	Sinfonia al Santo Sepolcro (intended to accompany a type of oratorio during the Easter season)
Sinfonia	Violin, strings	C major	192	
Sinfonia	Violin, strings	C major	192a	Different 3rd movement from RV 192; incomplete
Sinfonia	unknown	C major	741	Lost
Solo	Organ	A major	746	Largo & Andante arranged from RV 758
Sonata	Cello	D minor	38	Lost
Sonata	Cello	E♭ major	39	
Sonata	Cello	E minor	40	
Sonata	Cello	F major	41	
Sonata	Cello	G minor	42	
Sonata	Cello	A minor	43	
Sonata	Cello	A minor	44	
Sonata	Cello	B♭ major	45	
Sonata	Cello	B♭ major	46	
Sonata	Cello	B♭ major	47	
Sonata	Flute	C major	48	
Sonata	Flute	C major	809	Inauthentic; withdrawn and moved to Anh. 136; arrangement of a violin sonata in B♭ major by Gaetano Meneghetti
Sonata	Flute	D minor	49	Inauthentic. Withdrawn and moved to Anh. 99
Sonata	Flute	E minor	50	Inauthentic. Withdrawn and moved to Anh. 100
Sonata	Flute	G minor	51	
Sonata	Musette (or vielle à roue or recorder or flute or oboe or violin)	C major	54	Il pastor fido (inauthentic). By Nicolas Chédeville
Sonata	Musette (or vielle à roue or recorder or flute or oboe or violin)	C major	55	Il pastor fido (inauthentic). By Nicolas Chédeville
Sonata	Musette (or vielle à roue or recorder or flute or oboe or violin)	C major	56	Il pastor fido (inauthentic). By Nicolas Chédeville
Sonata	Musette (or vielle à roue or recorder or flute or oboe or violin)	G major	57	Il pastor fido (inauthentic). By Nicolas Chédeville
Sonata	Musette (or vielle à roue or recorder or flute or oboe or violin)	G minor	58	Il pastor fido (inauthentic). By Nicolas Chédeville
Sonata	Musette (or vielle à roue or recorder or flute or oboe or violin)	A major	59	Il pastor fido (inauthentic). By Nicolas Chédeville
Sonata	Oboe	C minor	53	
Sonata	Recorder	F major	52	
Sonata	Recorder	G major	806	Related to RV 810
Sonata	Violin	C major	1	Op. 2 No. 6
Sonata	Violin	C major	2	Dedicated to Pisendel. Related to RV 4
Sonata	Violin	C major	4	Incomplete; related to RV 2
Sonata	Violin	C major	815	
Sonata	Violin	C minor	5	
Sonata	Violin	C minor	7	
Sonata	Violin	C minor	7a	Incomplete
Sonata	Violin	C minor	8	Op. 2 No. 7
Sonata	Violin	D major	9	Op. 2 No. 11
Sonata	Violin	D major	10	
Sonata	Violin	D major	11	Incomplete
Sonata	Violin	D major	785	Inauthentic. Composed by Andrea Zani (Op. 1 No. 12)
Sonata	Violin	D major	798	Bergamo
Sonata	Violin	D major	810	Related to RV 806
Sonata	Violin	D major	816	
Sonata	Violin	D minor	13	Inauthentic (possibly composed by Johan Helmich Roman)
Sonata	Violin	D minor	14	Op. 2 No. 3
Sonata	Violin	D minor	15	
Sonata	Violin	E minor	16	Op. 2 No. 9
Sonata	Violin	E minor	17	Incomplete
Sonata	Violin	F major	18	Op. 5 No. 1
Sonata	Violin	F major	19	Dedicated to Pisendel
Sonata	Violin	F major	20	Op. 2 No. 4
Sonata	Violin	F minor	21	Op. 2 No. 10
Sonata	Violin	G major	23	Op. 2 No. 8
Sonata	Violin	G major	24	Inauthentic; withdrawn and moved to Anh. 140
Sonata	Violin	G major	25	Dedicated to Pisendel
Sonata	Violin	G major	820	
Sonata	Violin	G minor	26	
Sonata	Violin	G minor	27	Op. 2 No. 1
Sonata	Violin	G minor	28	
Sonata	Violin	A major	29	Dedicated to Pisendel
Sonata	Violin	A major	30	Op. 5 No. 2
Sonata	Violin	A major	31	Op. 2 No. 2
Sonata	Violin	A major	829	
Sonata	Violin	A minor	32	Op. 2 No. 12
Sonata	Violin	B♭ major	33	Op. 5 No. 3
Sonata	Violin	B♭ major	34	
Sonata	Violin	B♭ major	791	Incomplete
Sonata	Violin	B minor	35	Op. 5 No. 4
Sonata	Violin	B minor	36	Op. 2 No. 5
Sonata	Violin	B minor	37	Incomplete
Sonata	Violin	B minor	37a	Rediscovered by Oliver Fourés in 2022.
Sonata	Violin	C major	3	Manchester Sonata No. 1
Sonata	Violin	D minor	12	Manchester Sonata No. 2
Sonata	Violin	G minor	757	Manchester Sonata No. 3
Sonata	Violin	D major	755	Manchester Sonata No. 4
Sonata	Violin	B♭ major	759	Manchester Sonata No. 5
Sonata	Violin	A major	758	Manchester Sonata No. 6
Sonata	Violin	C minor	6	Manchester Sonata No. 7 – dedicated to Pisendel
Sonata	Violin	G major	22	Manchester Sonata No. 8
Sonata	Violin	E minor	17a	Manchester Sonata No. 9 – related to RV 314
Sonata	Violin	B minor	760	Manchester Sonata No. 10
Sonata	Violin	E♭ major	756	Manchester Sonata No. 11
Sonata	Violin	C major	754	Manchester Sonata No. 12
Sonata	Violin	G major	776	Probably unauthentic pastiche
Sonata	2 violins, viola	E♭ major	130	Sonata al Santo Sepolcro
Sonata	Violin, oboe, organ obbligato	C major	779	
Sonata	2 violins, oboe	C major	779a	
Sonata	2 oboes, bassoon	C major	801	del Signore Hendel
Trio sonata	2 violins	C major	60	
Trio sonata	2 violins	C major	61	Op. 1 No. 3
Trio sonata	2 violins	D major	62	Op. 1 No. 6
Trio sonata	2 violins	D minor	63	Op. 1 No. 12. Based on variations on La follia (Corelli)
Trio sonata	2 violins	D minor	64	Op. 1 No. 8
Trio sonata	2 violins	E♭ major	65	Op. 1 No. 7
Trio sonata	2 violins	E major	66	Op. 1 No. 4
Trio sonata	2 violins	E minor	67	Op. 1 No. 2
Trio sonata	2 violins	F major	68	
Trio sonata	2 violins	F major	69	Op. 1 No. 5
Trio sonata	2 violins	F major	70	
Trio sonata	2 violins	G major	71	
Trio sonata	2 violins	G minor	72	Op. 5 No. 6
Trio sonata	2 violins	G minor	73	Op. 1 No. 1
Trio sonata	2 violins	G minor	74	
Trio sonata	2 violins	A major	75	Op. 1 No. 9
Trio sonata	2 violins	B♭ major	76	Op. 5 No. 5
Trio sonata	2 violins	B♭ major	77	
Trio sonata	2 violins	B♭ major	78	Op. 1 No. 10
Trio sonata	2 violins	B minor	79	Op. 1 No. 11
Trio sonata	2 violins	A minor	828	
Trio sonata	Violin, lute	C major	82	
Trio sonata	Violin, cello	C minor	83	
Trio sonata	Flute, violin	D major	84	
Trio sonata	2 recorders	G major	80	Inauthentic. Withdrawn and moved to Anh. 101
Trio sonata	2 oboes	G minor	81	di Lund
Trio sonata	Violin, lute	G minor	85	
Trio sonata	2 flutes	A major	800	
Trio sonata	Recorder, bassoon	A minor	86	

=== Operas ===
Key:
music completely lost
music preserved at least in part

RV	Title	Libretto	Première date
729	Ottone in villa	Domenico Lalli	May 1713
727	Orlando finto pazzo	Grazio Braccioli	November 1714
819	Orlando furioso (1714)	Grazio Braccioli	December 1714
724	Nerone fatto Cesare	Matteo Noris	Carnival 1715
706	La costanza trionfante degl'amori e de gl'odii	Antonio Marchi	Carnival 1716
700	Arsilda, regina di Ponto	Domenico Lalli	27 or 28 October 1716
719	L'incoronazione di Dario	Adriano Morselli	23 January 1717
737	Tieteberga	Antonio Maria Lucchini	16 October 1717
Anh 58	Il vinto trionfante del vincitore	Antonio Marchi	Autumn 1717
701	Artabano, re dei Parti	Antonio Marchi	Carnival 1718
699	Armida al campo d'Egitto	Giovanni Palazzi	Carnival 1718
732	Scanderbeg	Antonio Salvi	22 June 1718
736	Teuzzone	Apostolo Zeno	28 December 1718
738	Tito Manlio	Matteo Noris	Carnival 1719
778	Tito Manlio	Matteo Noris	Carnival 1720
704	La Candace, o siano Li veri amici	Francesco Silvani and Domenico Lalli	Carnival 1720
720	Gl'inganni per vendetta	Giovanni Palazzi or Domenico Lalli	1720
739	La verità in cimento	Giovanni Palazzi	26 October (?) 1720
715	Filippo re di Macedonia	Domenico Lalli	27 December 1720
734	La Silvia	Enrico Bissari	28 August 1721
710	Ercole su'l Termodonte	Giacomo Francesco Bussani	January 1723
717	Giustino	Nicolò Beregan / Pietro Pariati	Carnival 1724
740	La virtù trionfante dell'amore, e dell'odio, overo Il Tigrane	Francesco Silvani	Carnival 1724
721	L'inganno trionfante in amore	Matteo Noris	Autumn 1725
707	Cunegonda	Agostino Piovene	29 January 1726
712	La fede tradita e vendicata	Francesco Silvani	16 February 1726
Anh 55	La tirannia castigata	Francesco Silvani	Carnival 1726
709	Dorilla in Tempe	Antonio Maria Lucchini	9 November 1726
722	Ipermestra	Antonio Salvi	25 January 1727
711	Farnace	Antonio Maria Lucchini	10 February 1727
735	Siroe, re di Persia	Metastasio	Ascension 1727
728	Orlando furioso	Grazio Braccioli	Autumn 1727
730	Rosilena ed Oronta	Giovanni Palazzi	Carnival 1728
702	Atenaide	Apostolo Zeno	29 December 1728
697	Argippo	Domenico Lalli	Autumn 1730
696	Alvilda regina de' Goti	Giulio Cesare Corradi	Spring 1731
733	Semiramide	Francesco Silvani and Domenico Lalli	Carnival 1731
714	La fida ninfa	Francesco Scipione	Carnival 1732
708	Doriclea	Antonio Marchi	1732
723	Motezuma	Girolamo Alvise Giusti	14 November 1733
725	L'Olimpiade	Metastasio	17 February 1734
695	L'Adelaide	Antonio Salvi	Carnival 1735
703	Il Tamerlano (Il Bajazet)	Agostino Piovene	Carnival 1735
718	Griselda	Apostolo Zeno / Carlo Goldoni	18 May 1735
698	Aristide	Carlo Goldoni	Autumn 1735
716	Ginevra principessa di Scozia	Antonio Salvi	17 January 1736
705	Catone in Utica	Metastasio	26 May 1737
726	L'oracolo in Messenia	Apostolo Zeno	30 December 1737
777	Il giorno felice	?	1737
731	Rosmira (Rosmira fedele)	Silvio Stampiglia	27 January 1738
713	Feraspe	Francesco Silvani	1739

=== Sacred music ===
Work	RV	Notes
Missa Sacrum	586	Disputed; withdrawn and moved to Anh. 112
Kyrie	587	
Gloria	588	
Gloria	589	
Gloria	590	Lost
Credo	591	
Credo	592	Disputed
Domine ad adiuvandum me festina	593	
Dixit Dominus	594	
Dixit Dominus	595	Di Praga
Confitebor tibi, Domine	596	
Beatus vir	597	
Beatus vir	598	
Beatus vir	599	Lost
Laudate pueri Dominum	600	
Laudate pueri Dominum	601	Psalm 112, for voice, flute, 2 oboes, strings & continuo in G major
Laudate pueri Dominum	602	
Laudate pueri Dominum	602a	
Laudate pueri Dominum	603	
In exitu Israel	604	
Credidi propter quod	605	Now RV Anh. 35b
Laudate Dominum	606	
Laetatus sum	607	
Nisi Dominus	608	
Lauda Jerusalem	609	
Magnificat	610 · 611	
Deus tuorum militum	612	
Gaude Mater Ecclesia	613	
Laudate Dominum	614	Disputed
Regina coeli	615	Incomplete
Salve Regina	616	
Salve Regina	617	
Salve Regina	618	
Salve Regina	619	Lost
Sanctorum meritis	620	
Stabat Mater	621	
Te Deum	622	Lost
Canta in prato, ride in monte	623	Not to be confused with RV 636, which is "Canta in prato, ride in fonte"
Carae rosae respirate	624	Incomplete without reconstruction of lost second violin and viola parts
Clarae, stellae	625	
In furore iustissimae irae	626	Solo motet for voice, strings & continuo in C minor
In turbato mare	627	
Invicti bellate	628	Incomplete, yet reconstructed and recorded by Academia Montis Regalis
Longe mala, umbrae, terrores	629	Not to be confused with RV 640, which is a similar motet on the same text but intended for different purposes
Nulla in mundo pax sincera	630	
O qui coeli terraeque serenitas	631	
Sum in medio tempestatum	632	
Vestro principi divino	633	
Vos aurae per montes	634	
Introduzione al Dixit (RV 595) "Ascende laeta"	635	
Introduzione al Dixit (RV 594?) "Canta in prato, ride in fonte"	636	Not to be confused with RV 623, which is "Canta in prato, ride in monte"
Introduzione ad un Gloria "Cur sagittas"	637	The preceding work that was to follow this introductory motet, most likely a lost setting of the Gloria in B♭, RV 590, is now presumably lost.
Introduzione al Miserere "Filiae maestae Jerusalem"	638	
Introduzione al Gloria (RV 588) "Jubilate o amoeni chori"	639	Introductory motet has third movement interwoven with Gloria, RV 588
Introduzione al Gloria (RV 588) "Jubilate o amoeni chori"	639a	
Introduzione al Gloria (RV 589) "Longe mala, umbrae, terrores"	640	Not to be confused with RV 629, which is a similar motet on the same text but intended for different purposes
Introduzione al Miserere "Non in pratis"	641	
Introduzione al Gloria (RV 589) "Ostro picta"	642	
Oratorio Moyses Deus Pharaonis	643	Incomplete; only libretto remains
Oratorio Juditha triumphans	644	
Oratorio L'adorazione delli tre re magi al bambino Gesu	645	Lost
Ad corda reclina	646	New text on the aria from act 2, scene 8 of Arsilda, regina di Ponto, RV 700
Eja voces plausum date	647	New text on the aria from act 2, scene 2 of Orlando furioso, RV 728
Ihr Himmel nun	648	New text on the aria from act 2, scene 2 of Arsilda, regina di Ponto, RV 700
Aria per la communione	748	Lost
Oratorio La vittoria navale predetta dal S Pontefice Pio V Ghisilieri	782	Lost
Confitebor tibi, domine	789	Manuscript found in damaged condition
Beatus vir	795	
Magnificat	797	Lost; possibly related to the extant settings of RV 610/610a/610b/611
Nisi Dominus	803	
Salve Regina	804	Lost
Dixit Dominus	807	
Vos invito, barbare faces	811	
Laetatus sum	827	

A possible setting, or even settings (considering the many settings of other liturgical text Vivaldi composed) of the Miserere may have existed, as hinted by the two introductory sets of movements intended for the piece(s), but such composition(s) have been lost.

=== Cantatas ===
Work	RV	Soloist and Instrumentation (All with basso continuo)
Alla caccia, alla caccia	670	alto solo
All'ombra di sospetto	678	soprano solo, flute
All'ombra d'un bel faggio	649	soprano solo
All'or che lo sguardo	650	soprano solo
Amor, hai vinto	651	soprano solo
Amor, hai vinto	683	alto solo, 2 violins, alto continuo
Aure voi piu non siete	652	soprano solo
Candida Lylia	747	soprano solo
Care selve amici prati	671	alto solo
Cessate, omai cessate	684	alto solo, 2 violins, alto continuo
Cessate, omai cessate	684a	alto solo, 2 violins, alto continuo
Che giova il sospirar	679	soprano solo, 2 violins, alto continuo
Del suo natio rigore	653	soprano solo
Elvira, Elvira anima mea	654	soprano solo
Era la notte	655	soprano solo
Filli di gioia	672	alto solo
Fonti di pianto piangete	656	soprano solo
Geme l'onda che parte	657	soprano solo
Il povero mio cor	658	soprano solo
Indarno cerca la tortorella	659	soprano solo
Ingrata, Lidia, hai vinto	673	alto solo
La farfalletta s'aggira	660	soprano solo
Lundi dal vago	680	soprano solo, violin
Nel partir da te mio caro	661	soprano solo
O mie porpore piu belle	685	alto solo, 2 violins, alto continuo
Par che tardo	662	soprano solo
Perche son molli	681	soprano solo, 2 violins
Perfidissimo cor!	674	alto solo
Piango, gemo, sospiro	675	alto solo
Pianti, sospiri	676	alto solo
Prendea con mandi latte	753	soprano solo
Qual in pioggia dorata	686	alto solo, 2 horns, 2 violins, alto continuo
Qual per ignoto	677	alto solo
Scherza di fronda	663	soprano solo
Seben vivono senz'alma	664	soprano solo
Si levi dal pensier	665	soprano solo
Si si luce adorate	666	soprano solo
Sorge vermiglia in ciel	667	soprano solo
T'intendo si mio cor	668	soprano solo
Tra l'erbe, i zeffiri	669	soprano solo
Vengo a voi luci adorate	682	soprano solo, 2 violins, alto continuo

=== Serenatas and other large vocal works ===
Work	RV	Form, Soloists and Instrumentation (All with basso continuo)
Le gare del dovere	688	(lost)
Le gare della giustitia e della pace	689	(lost)
Mio cor povero cor	690	"Serenata a 3" for 2 sopranos, tenor, 2 oboes, 2 horns, violin solo, strings
Il Mopso	691	"Egloga pescatoria" (lost)
Queste Eurilla gentil	692	"Serenata a quattro voci" (lost)
La Senna festeggiante	693	"Serenata a 3 voci" for bass, soprano, alto, 2 or more flutes, 2 or more oboes, strings
L'unione della pace et di marte	694	"Serenata a 3 voci" (lost)
La Gloria Himeneo	687	Wedding serenata for Louis XV, Also known as La Gloria e Himeneo (Imeneo) for soprano, alto and strings
