= La tempesta di mare (flute concerto) =

Musical composition by Antonio Vivaldi (c. 1728)

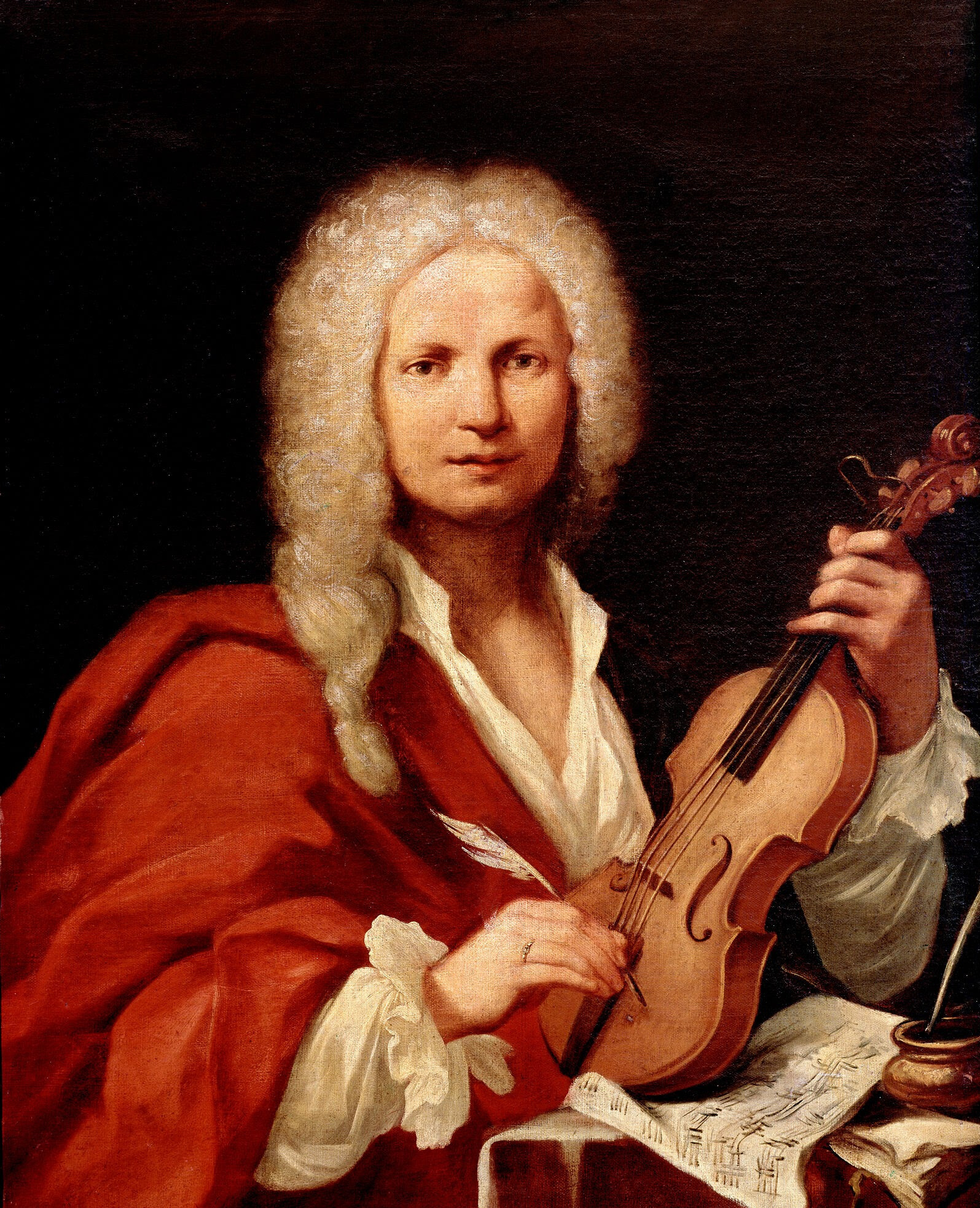
Vivaldi

La tempesta di mare ("The Storm at Sea"), a flute concerto in F major (RV 433; P. 261), is the first of Six Flute Concertos, Op. 10 by Antonio Vivaldi, published in the late 1720s. La tempesta di mare may also refer to two earlier versions of the same concerto, RV 98, a concerto da camera (chamber concerto) featuring the flute, from which Vivaldi derived the concerto grosso RV 570.

La tempesta di mare may also refer to the violin concerto with the same name published in the same 1725 edition as the Four Seasons: this is however a different composition than the three flute concerto variants.

== History ==
Vivaldi helped to bring the concerto to a mainstream form, not only by expanding on ritornello form, but by emphasizing the slow movements of concertos, which were in a two part binary form. Solo instruments that Vivaldi wrote concertos for include violin, bassoon, cello, oboe, viola d'amore, flute and mandolin. He also wrote ensemble concertos (concerto grosso and/or chamber concerto), where three or more soloists participate, which number over 30 written. Vivaldi had an extensive influence on the concerto genre, helping to pioneer the structure, expanding the boundaries of the genre, and showing that any instrument could have a concerto.

Vivaldi's contemporaries and predecessors such as Purcell, Bach and Handel featured the flute (traverso and/or recorder) significantly in their works. RV 433 was conceived as a concerto for transverse flute in D. The first publication of the concerto, included as No. 1 in Vivaldi's Op. 10, VI Concerti a Flauto Traverso, was around 1728 in Amsterdam, by Michel-Charles Le Cène.

Giving a musical impression of a storm was a popular theme in baroque music. For instance operas like Marin Marais' Alcyone contained famous storm scenes. Telemann wrote a secular cantata La Tempesta (The Storm), TWV 20:42, after an Italian libretto by Metastasio. Vivaldi wrote several tempesta di mare concertos. Two variants of RV 433, RV 98 and RV 570, are in the chamber concerto and concerto grosso format respectively. RV 98 is scored for flute, oboe, violin, bassoon, and continuo, from which Vivaldi created the RV 570 concerto grosso by adding orchestral violins to reinforce the solo oboe and violin, and a viola part doubling the bass at the upper octave. An unrelated tempesta di mare concerto, a violin concerto in E♭ major, RV 253, is included as No. 5 in Vivaldi's Op. 8 Il cimento dell'armonia e dell'inventione. The Four Seasons, the first four concertos of that collection, also include a few musical depictions of stormy weather.

According to Federico Maria Sardelli the chamber concerto version of La tempesta di mare, RV 98, was possibly written for Ignazio Sieber, during the time in which he worked with the composer at the Ospedale della Pietà from 1713 to 1716. This means that this version of the concerto may have been the earliest flute concerto ever composed, and also the first flute piece to include the problematic high F_{6}. Sardelli's conclusions, if correct, would overturn "the received scholarly view that, rather than writing for the recorder in the first two or three decades of the eighteenth century, then switching over to the flute, Vivaldi already preferred the flute in the 1710s and did not start writing for the recorder until the early 1720s".

== Structure ==
The movements of the concerto are:

1. Allegro
2. Largo
3. Presto

== Reception ==
RV 433 is not among the five concertos Vivaldi composed for the recorder (RV 441–445). Being one of the 14 concertos Vivaldi wrote for traverso (including one for two traversos), the concerto is nonetheless often performed as a recorder concerto, like many of these other traverso concertos. Thus it is for instance included in Dan Laurin's Recorder Concertos CD. There are dozens of recordings of the concerto, performed on the traverso as well as the recorder, for instance by Jean-Pierre Rampal in the 1960s, by Frans Brüggen and by Barthold Kuijken with La Petite Bande.

== Sources ==
Score editions

- Le Cène c.1728: Vivaldi, Antonio VI Concerti a Flauto Traverso ..., Op. 10. Amsterdam: Michel-Charles Le Cène, c.1728. OCLC 658705889
- Dover 2002: Vivaldi, Antonio. Six Flute Concertos Op. 10, in Full Score: With Related Concertos for Other Wind Instruments, edited by Eleanor Selfridge-Field. New York: Dover, 2002. ISBN 9780486422435.

Other

- Lasocki, David. "Vivaldi's Music for Flute and Recorder. By Federico Maria Sardelli. Translated by Michael Talbot. Burlington, VT: Ashgate in association with Istituto Italiano Antonio Vivaldi/Fondazione "Giorgio Cini", 2007. [xxii, 336 p. ISBN 9780754637141". [Review] Notes, second series, 64, no. 3 (March 2008): 496–98.
- Powell, Ardal. "Vivaldi's Flutes: Federico Maria Sardelli, Vivaldi's Music for Flute and Recorder, trans. by Michael Talbot (Aldershot: Ashgate, 2007)". Early Music 36, no. 1 (February 2008): 120–22.
- Sardelli, Federico Maria. Vivaldi's Music for Flute and Recorder, translated by Michael Talbot. Aldershot: Ashgate Publishing, Ltd, 2007. ISBN 075463714X.
- Selfridge-Field, Eleanor. "Vivaldi's Esoteric Instruments". Early Music 6, no. 3 (July 1978): 332–38.
- Talbot, Michael. Vivaldi, second edition. Master Musicians Series. London: J. M. Dent and Sons, 1993. Reprinted in paperback, Oxford and New York: Oxford University Press, 2000.
- Talbot, Michael. "Vivaldi, Antonio (Lucio)" in The New Grove Dictionary of Music and Musicians, second edition, edited by Stanley Sadie and John Tyrrell. London: Macmillan Publishers, 2001.
- Talbot, Michael. "Antonio Vivaldi. Six Flute Concertos, Op. 10, in Full Score: With Related Concertos for Other Wind Instruments. Edited with an introduction by Eleanor Selfridge-Field. Mineola, NY: Dover Publications, c2002. Introd., p. vii-ix; facsim. reprod., 1 p.; score, p. 1–166; the Dover edition, p. 169–76. ISBN 0-486-42243-7". Notes, second series 60, no. 4 (June 2004): 1021–24.
