= F major =

Major key and scale based on the note F

- Relative key: D minor
- Parallel key: F minor
- Dominant key: C major
- Subdominant key: B-flat major

Component pitches
- F, G, A, B♭, C, D, E

F major is a major scale based on F, with the pitches F, G, A, B♭, C, D, and E. Its key signature has one flat. Its relative minor is D minor and its parallel minor is F minor.

The F major scale is:

Changes needed for the melodic and harmonic versions of the scale are written in with accidentals as necessary. The F harmonic major and melodic major scales are:

F major is the home key of the English horn, the basset horn, the horn in F, the trumpet in F and the bass Wagner tuba. Thus, music in F major for these transposing instruments is written in C major. These instruments sound a perfect fifth lower than written, with the exception of the trumpet in F which sounds a fourth higher.

== Scale degree chords ==
The scale degree chords of F major are:

- Tonic – F major
- Supertonic – G minor
- Mediant – A minor
- Subdominant – B-flat major
- Dominant – C major
- Submediant – D minor
- Leading-tone – E diminished

== Notable compositions in F major ==
- Antonio Vivaldi
  - Trio sonata Op. 1/5 for two violins and basso continuo, RV 69
  - Violin sonata Op. 2/4, RV 20
  - Violin sonata Op. 5/1, RV 18
  - Violin concerto Op. 3/7 from L'estro armonico, for four violins and orchestra, RV 567
  - Violin concerto Op. 4/9 from La Stravaganza, RV 284
  - Violin concerto Op. 7/10, Il Ritiro, RV 294
  - Violin concerto Op. 8/3, Autumn from The four seasons, RV 293
  - Flute concerto Op. 10/1, RV 433, La tempesta di mare
  - Flute concerto Op. 10/5, RV 434
- Johann Sebastian Bach
  - English Suite No. 4, BWV 809
  - Italian Concerto in F major, BWV 971
  - Brandenburg Concertos Nos. 1 & 2, BWV 1046–1047
- Wolfgang Amadeus Mozart
  - Concerto for 3 Pianos, K. 242
  - Piano Concerto No. 11, K. 413
  - Piano Concerto No. 19, K. 459
  - Piano Sonata No. 12, K. 332/300k
  - String Quartet No. 23, K. 590
  - Violin Sonata No. 24, K. 376
  - Violin Sonata No. 36, K. 547
  - Oboe Quartet, K. 370/368b
- Ludwig van Beethoven
  - Symphony No. 6, Op. 68 ("Pastoral")
  - Symphony No. 8, Op. 93
  - Romance No. 2 for violin and orchestra, Op. 50
  - String Quartet No. 1, Op. 18/1
  - String Quartet No. 7, Op. 59/1
  - String Quartet No. 16, Op. 135
  - Violin Sonata No. 5, Op. 24 (Frühling)
  - Piano Sonata No. 6, Op. 10/2
  - Piano Sonata No. 22, Op. 54
  - Horn Sonata, Op. 17
- Carl Maria von Weber
  - Bassoon Concerto
- Franz Schubert
  - Octet, D. 803
  - Mass No. 1, D. 105
  - Deutsche Messe (German Mass), D 872
  - Adagio and Rondo Concertante for piano quartet, D. 487
- Felix Mendelssohn
  - Violin Sonata No. 1
  - Violin Sonata No. 3
- Franz Liszt
  - Transcendental Étude No. 3 "Paysage"
- Frédéric Chopin
  - Ballade No. 2
  - Étude Op. 10, No. 8 "Sunshine/Encore"
  - Nocturne Op. 15, No. 1
  - Étude Op. 25, No. 3 "The Horseman"
  - Prelude Op. 28, No. 23 "Pleasure Boat"
  - Waltz Op. 34, No. 3
- Charles-Valentin Alkan
  - Prelude Op. 31, No. 11 "Un petit rien"
- Johannes Brahms
  - Ein Deutsches Requiem, Op. 45
  - String Quintet No. 1, Op. 88
  - Symphony No. 3, Op. 90
  - Cello Sonata No. 2, Op. 99
- Anton Bruckner
  - String Quintet
- Maurice Ravel
  - String Quartet
- George Gershwin
  - Concerto in F
- Dmitri Shostakovich
  - String Quartet No. 3, Op. 73
  - Piano Concerto No. 2, Op. 102
- Antonín Dvořák
  - Symphony No. 5, Op. 76
  - String Quartet No. 12 (American Quartet), Op. 96

== See also ==
- Key (music)
- Major and minor
- Chord (music)
- Chord notation

No.	Flats		Sharps	
No.	Major	minor	Major	minor
0	C	a	C	a
1	F	d	G	e
2	B♭	g	D	b
3	E♭	c	A	f♯
4	A♭	f	E	c♯
5	D♭	b♭	B	g♯
6	G♭	e♭	F♯	d♯
7	C♭	a♭	C♯	a♯
8	F♭	d♭	G♯	e♯
