= B minor =

Minor scale based on B

- Relative key: D major
- Parallel key: B major
- Dominant key: F-sharp minor
- Subdominant key: E minor

Component pitches
- B, C♯, D, E, F♯, G, A

B minor is a minor scale based on B, consisting of the pitches B, C♯, D, E, F♯, G, and A. Its key signature has two sharps. Its relative major is D major and its parallel major is B major.

The B natural minor scale is:

Changes needed for the melodic and harmonic versions of the scale are written in with accidentals as necessary. The B harmonic minor and melodic minor scales are:

Christian Friedrich Daniel Schubart (1739–1791) regarded B minor as a key expressing a quiet acceptance of fate and very gentle complaint, something commentators find to be in line with Bach's use of the key in his St John Passion. By the end of the Baroque era, however, conventional academic views of B minor had shifted: Composer-theorist Francesco Galeazzi (1758–1819) opined that B minor was not suitable for music in good taste. Beethoven labelled a B-minor melodic idea in one of his sketchbooks as a "black key".

== Scale degree chords ==
The scale degree chords of B minor are:

- Tonic – B minor
- Supertonic – C-sharp diminished
- Mediant – D major
- Subdominant – E minor
- Dominant – F-sharp minor
- Submediant – G major
- Subtonic – A major

== Notable compositions in B minor ==
- Johann Sebastian Bach
  - Mass in B minor
  - Orchestral Suite No. 2, BWV 1067
  - Prelude and Fugue in B minor, BWV 544
  - French Suite No. 3, BWV 814
  - Partita for Violin No. 1, BWV 1002
  - Flute Sonata in B minor, BWV 1030
- Ludwig van Beethoven
  - Bagatelle Op. 126/4
- Alban Berg
  - Piano Sonata, Op. 1
- Johannes Brahms
  - Ballade (Intermezzo) Op. 10/3
  - Rhapsody Op. 79/1
  - Clarinet Quintet, Op. 115
  - Intermezzo Op. 119/1
- Alexander Borodin
  - Symphony No. 2
- Frédéric Chopin
  - Scherzo No. 1, Op. 20
  - Étude, Op. 25, No. 10
  - Prelude in B minor "Tolling Bells", Op. 28, No. 6
  - Piano Sonata No. 3, Op. 58
  - Mazurka Op. 30/2
  - Mazurka, Op. 33/4
  - Waltz, Op. 69, No. 2
- Antonín Dvořák
  - Cello Concerto, Op. 104
- Edward Elgar
  - Violin Concerto
- César Franck
  - Prélude, Choral et Fugue, FWV 21
- Wilhelm Furtwängler
  - Symphonic Concerto
- Edvard Grieg
  - In the Hall of the Mountain King
- Joseph Haydn
  - String Quartet, Op. 33/1
  - String Quartet, Op. 64/2
- Johann Nepomuk Hummel
  - Piano Concerto No. 3, Op. 89
- Franz Liszt
  - Piano Sonata, S. 178
  - Ballade No. 2, S. 171
- Felix Mendelssohn
  - String Symphony No. 10 in B minor, MWV N 10
- Wolfgang Amadeus Mozart
  - Adagio, K. 540
  - Flute Quartet, K. 285: II. Adagio
- Niccolò Paganini
  - Violin Concerto No. 2, Op. 7
- Sergei Rachmaninoff
  - Moments musicaux No. 3, Op. 16
  - Prelude in B minor, Op. 32, No. 10
  - Études-Tableaux No. 4 in B minor, Op. 39
- Camille Saint-Saëns
  - Violin Concerto No. 3, Op. 61
- Domenico Scarlatti
  - 12 of his 555 piano sonatas: K 27, 87, 173, 197, 227, 293, 376, 377, 408, 409, 497, 498
- Franz Schubert
  - Symphony No. 8 (Unfinished), D. 759
  - Rondo in B minor for violin and piano, D. 895
- Alexander Scriabin
  - Fantaisie in B minor, Op. 28
- Pyotr Ilyich Tchaikovsky
  - Pezzo capriccioso
  - Manfred Symphony
  - Symphony No. 6 (Pathetique), Op. 74
- Georg Philipp Telemann
  - 12 Fantasias for Solo Flute: Nos. 3 and 9
  - Sonata for two flutes or violins No. 5
- Antonio Vivaldi
  - Trio Sonata Op. 1/11
  - Violin Sonata, Op. 2/5
  - Concerto for violin Op. 3/10
  - Violin Sonata, Op. 5/4
  - Violin Concerto for four violins Op. 9/12

== See also ==
- Key (music)
- Major and minor
- Chord (music)
- Chord notation

No.	Flats		Sharps	
No.	Major	minor	Major	minor
0	C	a	C	a
1	F	d	G	e
2	B♭	g	D	b
3	E♭	c	A	f♯
4	A♭	f	E	c♯
5	D♭	b♭	B	g♯
6	G♭	e♭	F♯	d♯
7	C♭	a♭	C♯	a♯
8	F♭	d♭	G♯	e♯
