= Concerto alla rustica =

Composition by Antonio Vivaldi

Concerto for Strings in G major; Concerto alla rustica
- by Antonio Vivaldi
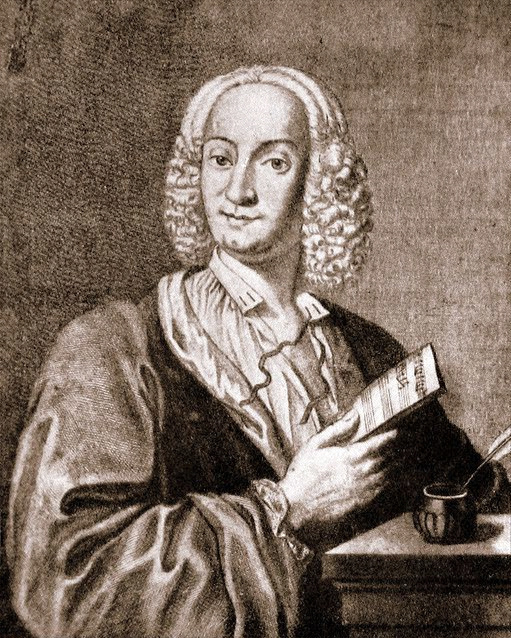
- The composer
- Key: G major
- Catalogue: RV 151
- Genre: Late Baroque
- Form: Concerto
- Composed: Between mid-1720 and 1730
- Movements: 3
- Scoring: String orchestra and basso continuo, with two oboes in the finale

The Concerto for Strings in G major, RV 151, commonly referred to as the Concerto alla rustica (Italian for 'rustic concerto'), is a concerto for orchestra without soloists by Antonio Vivaldi. It was written between mid-1720 and 1730, and is one of the composer's best-known concertos.

== Composition ==
The Concerto alla rustica, unlike some other of Vivaldi's concertos, did not include a descriptive programme. It was composed some time between mid-1720 and 1730, during which time Vivaldi was working on his Contest Between Harmony and Invention, Op. 8—the work from which his best-known set of compositions, The Four Seasons, derives.

The manuscript of this concerto was written partially on the same paper as his chamber version of the Goldfinch Concerto, Il Gardellino, RV 90b. The musicologist Michael Talbot has said that since that concerto was supplied to the court of the Ottoboni family in Rome, it is likely that the Concerto alla rustica was as well.

== Structure ==
The concerto is in three movements and typically takes between 5 and 6 minutes to perform. It is scored for a string orchestra and basso continuo, and includes two oboes in its final movement. The movements are as follows:

1. Presto
2. Adagio
3. Allegro

The first movement is a moto perpetuo—a virtuoso piece for a Baroque orchestra in G major. It veers to G minor towards the final bars of the movement. The second movement is slow and contrasting, with long chords. The third movement is dance-like and swift. This last movement emphasizes the sharpened fourth degree of the scale (C sharp), therefore using a Lydian mode—a trait common to folk music. This feature was probably known to Vivaldi thanks to the Polish-style sonatas and concertos of his contemporary Georg Philipp Telemann.

== Use in popular culture ==
The Concerto alla rustica has been featured in a number of films and TV series, among them:

- All That Jazz by Bob Fosse (1979)
- Gramps Is in the Resistance by Jean-Marie Poiré (1983)
- El Aura by Fabián Bielinsky (2005)
- Marie Antoinette by Sofia Coppola (2006)
- Mijo (2015), the second episode of the television series Better Call Saul, created by Vince Gilligan
- Freaky Tuesday (2019), Season 3 Episode 5 of GLOW opens with a riff on the "It's Showtime, Folks!" montage in All That Jazz
- Napoleon (film) by Ridley Scott (2023)
- The Four Seasons (TV series) by Tina Fey, and Lang Fisher and Tracey Wigfield (2025)
