= Mandolin Concerto (Vivaldi) =

Musical composition designated as RV 425

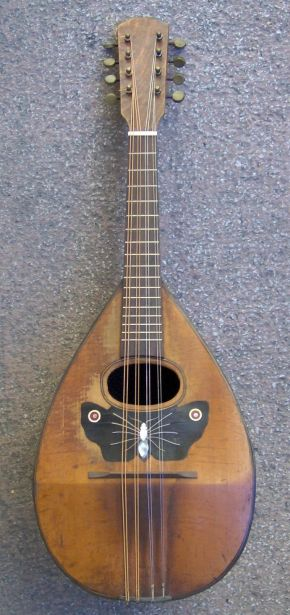
Mandolin

Mandolin Concerto in C major, RV 425 (8:20)
Performed by The Milan Baroque Soloists

The Mandolin Concerto in C major, RV 425, was written by the Italian composer Antonio Vivaldi in 1725. Music from the first movement of the concerto was featured in the 1979 movie Kramer vs. Kramer.

== Movements ==
There are three movements:

1. Allegro
2. Largo (A minor)
3. Allegro

== See also ==
- List of compositions by Antonio Vivaldi
