= Concerto in C major, RV 559 =

1740 composition by Antonio Vivaldi

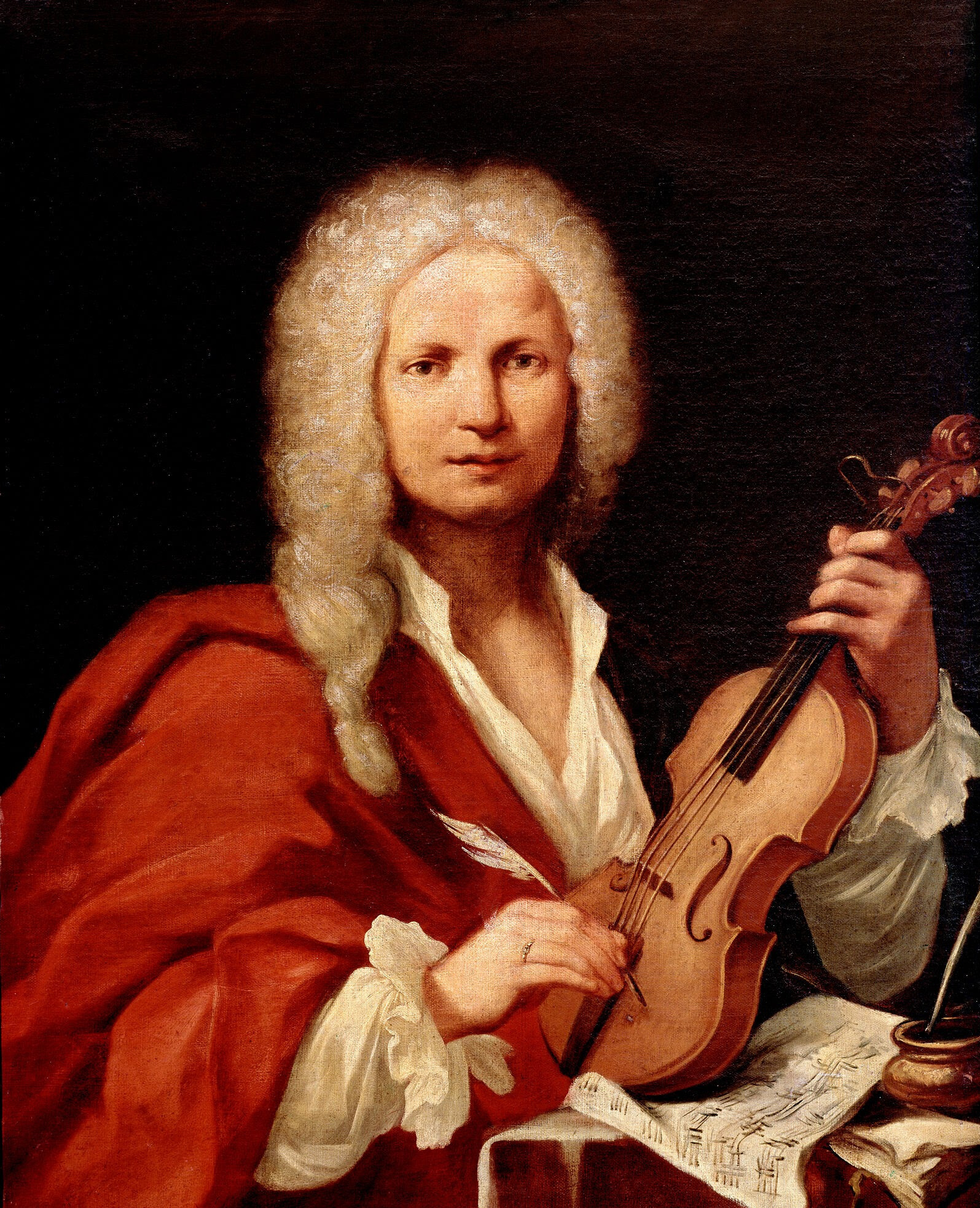
Vivaldi in 1723.

The Concerto in C major, RV 559, is a concerto grosso by the Italian composer Antonio Vivaldi, completed in 1740.

The concerto's instrumentation is for two oboes, two clarinets, string section and harpsichord. It is one of two of Vivaldi's concerti grossi for this instrumentation, the other being RV 560. The movements are: 1. Larghetto – [Allegro], 2. Largo, 3. Allegro. A performance lasts for about 10 to 12 minutes.

== Modern interpretations ==
Although this concerto was already a popular concert piece, it was brought to a much larger audience through its inclusion, as one of six animated shorts based on classical music, in the 1976 Italian animated feature film Allegro Non Troppo by Bruno Bozzetto.

== See also ==
- List of compositions by Antonio Vivaldi
