= RV9 =

RV9 may refer to:

- Mandala 9, the ninth mandala of the Rigveda
- Norwegian National Road 9 (Norwegian: Riksvei 9)
- RealVideo 9, a video codec
- Van's Aircraft RV-9, a kit aircraft
- Sonata No. 11 in D Major, RV 9, from Antonio Vivaldi's Twelve Trio Sonatas, Op. 2
