= Il gran mogol =

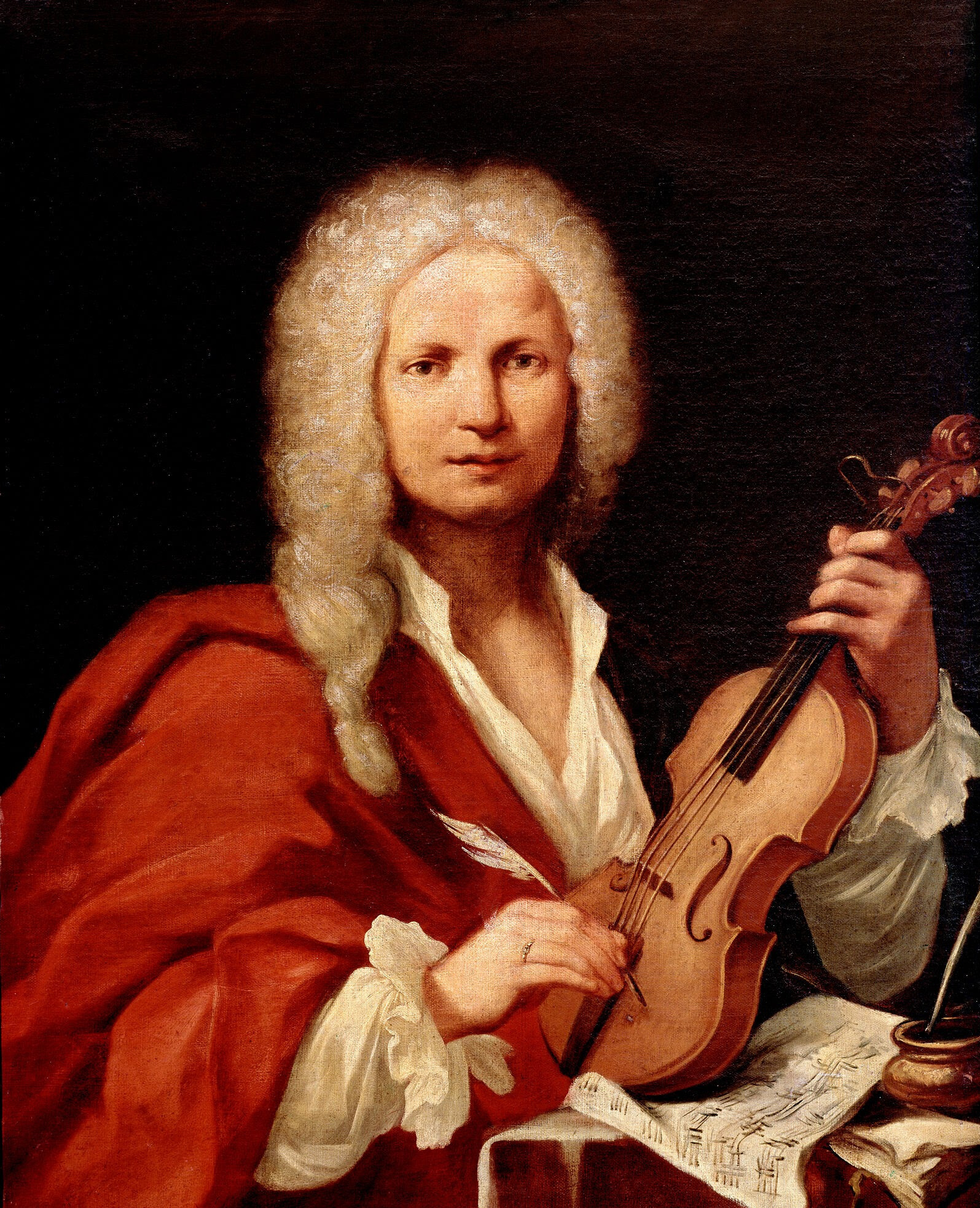
Vivaldi

Il gran mogol (The Grand Moghul), RV 431a, is a flute concerto by Antonio Vivaldi, written in the late 1720s or early 1730s. It was the Indian part of a set of four 'national' concertos, La Francia (France), La Spagna (Spain) and L'Inghilterra (England) – the other three are all lost.

It appeared in a Dutch bookseller's sale catalogue of 1759 and was then lost until 2010, when it was rediscovered by Andrew Woolley in the papers of Lord Robert Kerr (?-1746), the son of William Kerr, 3rd Marquess of Lothian, now in the National Archives of Scotland. Kerr was a flautist himself and is thought to have collected it on a grand tour of Italy. Number RV 431a has been assigned to the concerto in Ryom Verzeichnis.

== See also ==
- List of compositions by Antonio Vivaldi
