= Concerto for Two Cellos, RV 531 =

Concerto by Antonio Vivaldi

Concerto for Two Cellos
- Concerto by Antonio Vivaldi
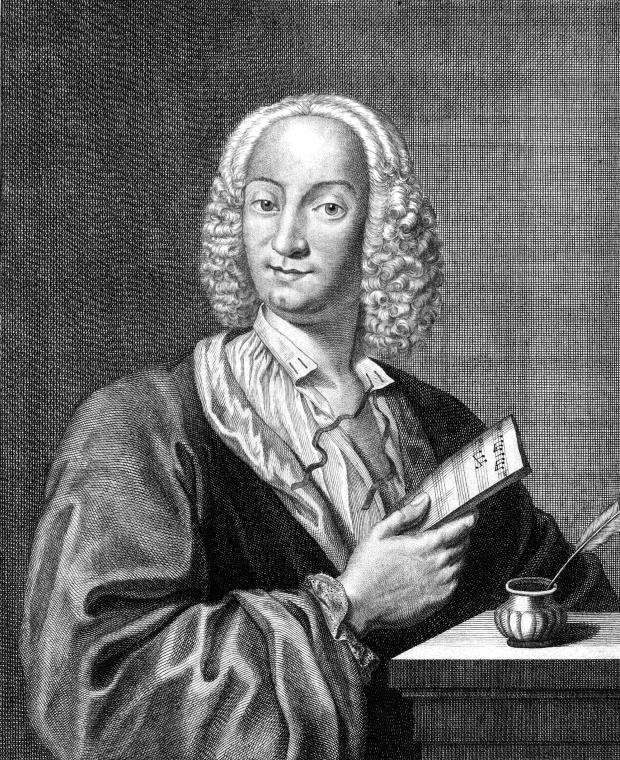
- Engraving of Vivaldi by La Cave, 1725
- Key: G minor
- Catalogue: RV 531
- Composed: 1720s
- Movements: 3
- Scoring: 2 cellos; strings; continuo

Antonio Vivaldi's Concerto for Two Cellos in G minor, RV 531 is a concerto for two cellos, string orchestra and basso continuo in three movements, believed to have been composed in the 1720s. It is Vivaldi's only concerto for two cellos, and begins unusually with an entry of the solo instruments alone.

== History ==
Vivaldi used the cello as a solo instrument in several compositions, which was a new trend during the period. He composed 27 concertos for cello, string orchestra and basso continuo. Among these cello concertos, RV 531 is the only one for two cellos. Vivaldi composed it possibly in the 1720s in Venice. A manuscript was found in the Renzo Giordano Collection at the Turin National University Library, which holds much of Vivaldi's personal collection.

== Music ==
The concerto is structured in three movements:

1. Allegro
2. Largo
3. Allegro

The first movement begins not with the usual instrumental ritornello, but with the two soloists alone, imitating each other in fast succession, with virtuoso passages. Both soloists are equals, first competing without upper strings. Karl Heller noted that "the dark color of the two deep-toned instruments perfectly matches the serious expression, which is devoid of all virtuosity". He continued:

The most striking aspect of the first movement (Allegro) is the wholly individual organizational approach that Vivaldi took in the opening. The two cellos imitate each other at a distance of one bar; they then play for the rest of the movement at an interval of a third, and play eight bars of figuration over the continuo's G minor harmony."

In the second movement, marked Largo, the two soloists and the continuo cellist form a trio, for even greater low-range sonority.

The final movement, Allegro, begins with "catchy offbeat syncopations" in the orchestra, before the soloists enter for "musical acrobatics". The movement contains a fugal section begun by the second cello.

The musicologist Michael Talbot noted the concerto's "highly charged emotional content" showing right at the beginning, and read "an almost autobiographical sadness" in the slow movement. He found the "frenetic" finale "see-sawing in rhythm and tonality alike", and summarized: "This is a concerto to single out among the hundreds that Vivaldi wrote."

== Recordings ==
Yo-Yo Ma and Jonathan Manson recorded the concerto in November 2003.
