= Il cimento dell'armonia e dell'inventione =

Set of concertos by Antonio Vivaldi

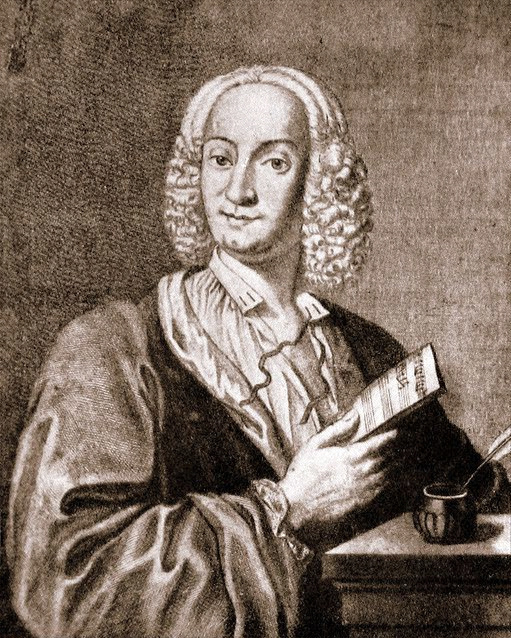
Antonio Vivaldi (engraving by François Morellon de La Cave, from Michel-Charles Le Cène’s edition of Vivaldi’s Op. 8, 1725)

Title page, 1725

Il cimento dell’armonia e dell’inventione (The Contest Between Harmony and Invention) is a set of twelve violin concertos written by Antonio Vivaldi and published in 1725 as Op. 8. All are for violin solo, strings and basso continuo. The first four, which date back to 1718–23, are called The Four Seasons (Le quattro stagioni). The set was published in the Amsterdam workshop of Michel-Charles Le Cène and dedicated to Wenceslas, Count of Morzin, an advisor to Charles VI, Holy Roman Emperor (not to be confused with Karl Joseph, Count Morzin, benefactor of Joseph Haydn).

== Title ==
The work’s title refers to the dialectic relationship between the 18th century “harmony”, i.e. the traditional compositional technique and “invention”, the innate creative imagination that directs this technique. At first glance, the title seems to allegorically encapsulate the struggle between strict compositional technique and spontaneous creativity.

However, if the term “il cimento” is taken to mean “the assay”, “the quality test”, then Vivaldi did not mean for the title to express “the battle between Harmony and Invention for the leading role in music”, but rather the “quality test on both harmony and invention”. It is, thus, probable that Vivaldi meant the title to act as an advertisement of his compositional adequacy in both fields.

== List of concertos ==
- Concerto No. 1 in E major, “La primavera” (Spring), RV 269
- Concerto No. 2 in G minor, “L’estate” (Summer), RV 315
- Concerto No. 3 in F major, “L’autunno” (Autumn), RV 293
- Concerto No. 4 in F minor, “L’inverno” (Winter), RV 297
- Concerto No. 5 in E♭ major, “La tempesta di mare” (The Storm at Sea or The Sea Storm), RV 253
- Concerto No. 6 in C major, “Il piacere” (Pleasure), RV 180
- Concerto No. 7 in D minor, “Per Pisendel” (For Pisendel), RV 242
- Concerto No. 8 in G minor, RV 332
- Concerto No. 9 in D minor, RV 236 (scored for violin) / RV 454 (scored for oboe)
- Concerto No. 10 in B♭ major, “La caccia” (The Hunt), RV 362
- Concerto No. 11 in D major, RV 210
- Concerto No. 12 in C major, RV 178 (scored for violin) / RV 449 (scored for oboe)
