= La cetra (Vivaldi) =

Set of twelve violin concertos by Antonio Vivaldi

La Cetra, Op.9

La cetra, Op. 9, is a set of twelve violin concertos by Antonio Vivaldi, published in 1727. All of them are for violin solo, strings, and basso continuo, except No. 9 in B♭, which features two solo violins. The set was named after the cetra, a lyre-like instrument, and was dedicated to Emperor Charles VI.

La cetra is also the title given to another set of twelve violin concertos by Vivaldi which was never published. This set is almost entirely different from the published set, sharing only one concerto and one concerto movement. Like the published set, it was dedicated to Emperor Charles.

== List of concerti ==
- Concerto No. 1 in C major, RV 181a
1. Allegro
2. Largo
3. Allegro
- Concerto No. 2 in A major, RV 345
1. Allegro
2. Largo
3. Allegro
- Concerto No. 3 in G minor, RV 334
1. Allegro non molto
2. Largo
3. Allegro non molto
- Concerto No. 4 in E major, RV 263a
1. Allegro non molto
2. Largo
3. Allegro non molto
- Concerto No. 5 in A minor, RV 358
1. Adagio – Presto
2. Largo
3. Allegro
- Concerto No. 6 in A major, RV 348
1. Allegro
2. Largo
3. Allegro non molto
- Concerto No. 7 in B♭ major, RV 359
1. Allegro
2. Largo
3. Allegro
- Concerto No. 8 in D minor, RV 238
1. Allegro
2. Largo
3. Allegro
- Concerto No. 9 in B♭ major, RV 530
1. Allegro
2. Largo e spiccato
3. Allegro
- Concerto No. 10 in G major, RV 300
1. Allegro molto
2. Largo cantabile
3. Allegro
- Concerto No. 11 in C minor, RV 198a
1. Allegro
2. Adagio
3. Allegro
- Concerto No. 12 in B minor, RV 391
1. Allegro non molto
2. Largo
3. Allegro
