= Six Concertos, Op. 11 (Vivaldi) =

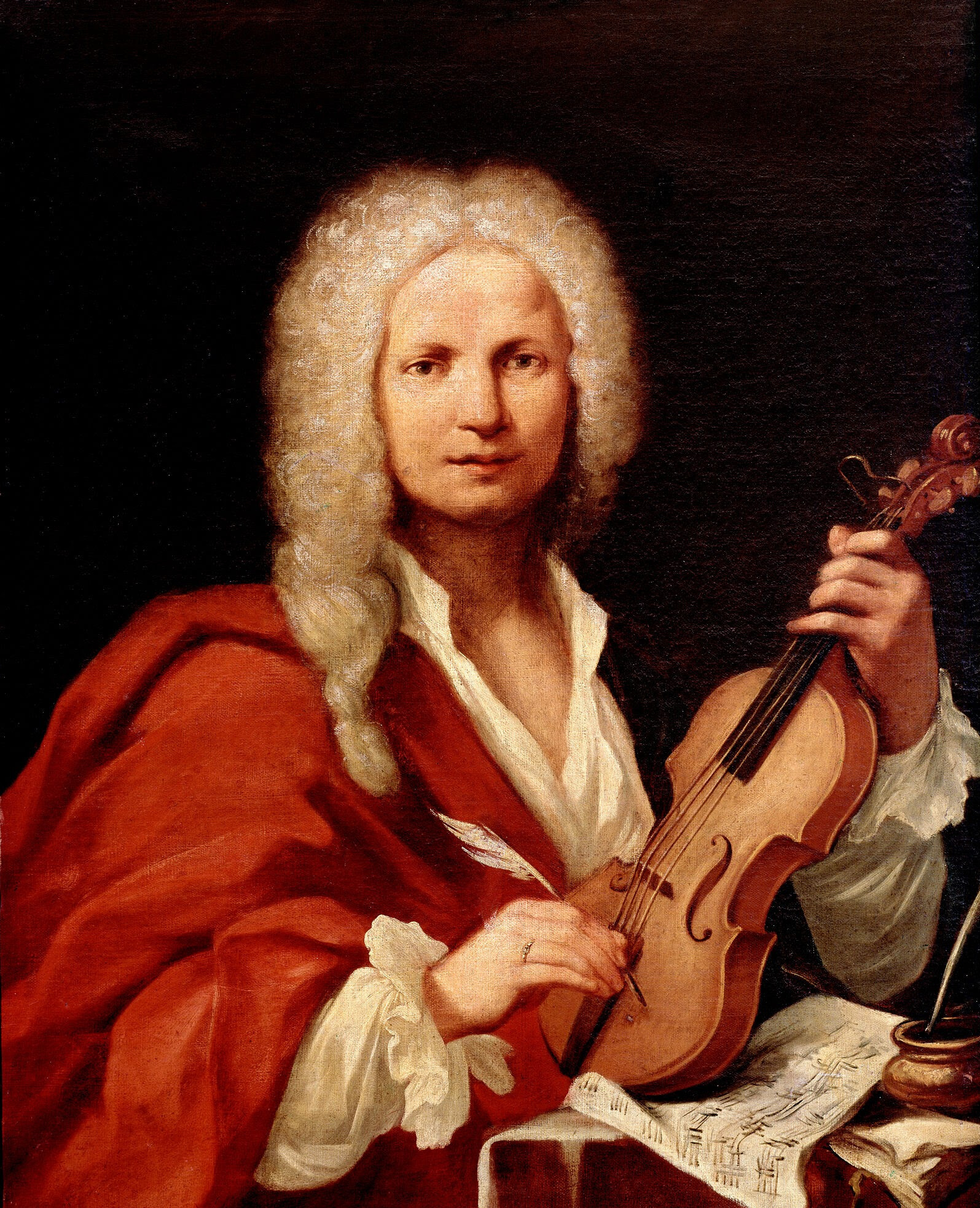
Vivaldi

Antonio Vivaldi wrote a set of concerti, Op. 11, in 1729.

- Concerto No. 1 for violin, strings and continuo in D Major, RV 207
1. Allegro
2. Largo
3. Allegro
- Concerto No. 2 for violin, strings and figured bass in E minor, "Il favorito", RV 277
1. Allegro
2. Andante
3. Allegro
- Concerto No. 3 for violin, strings and figured bass in A Major, RV 336
1. Allegro
2. Aria: Andante
3. Allegro
- Concerto No. 4 for violin, strings and figured bass in G Major, RV 308
1. Allegro
2. Largo cantabile
3. Allegro
- Concerto No. 5 for violin, strings and figured bass in C minor, RV 202
1. Allegro non molto
2. Largo
3. Allegro non molto
- Concerto No. 6 for oboe, strings and figured bass in G minor, RV 460
1. Allegro
2. Largo e cantabile
3. Allegro
