= Lord Robert Kerr =

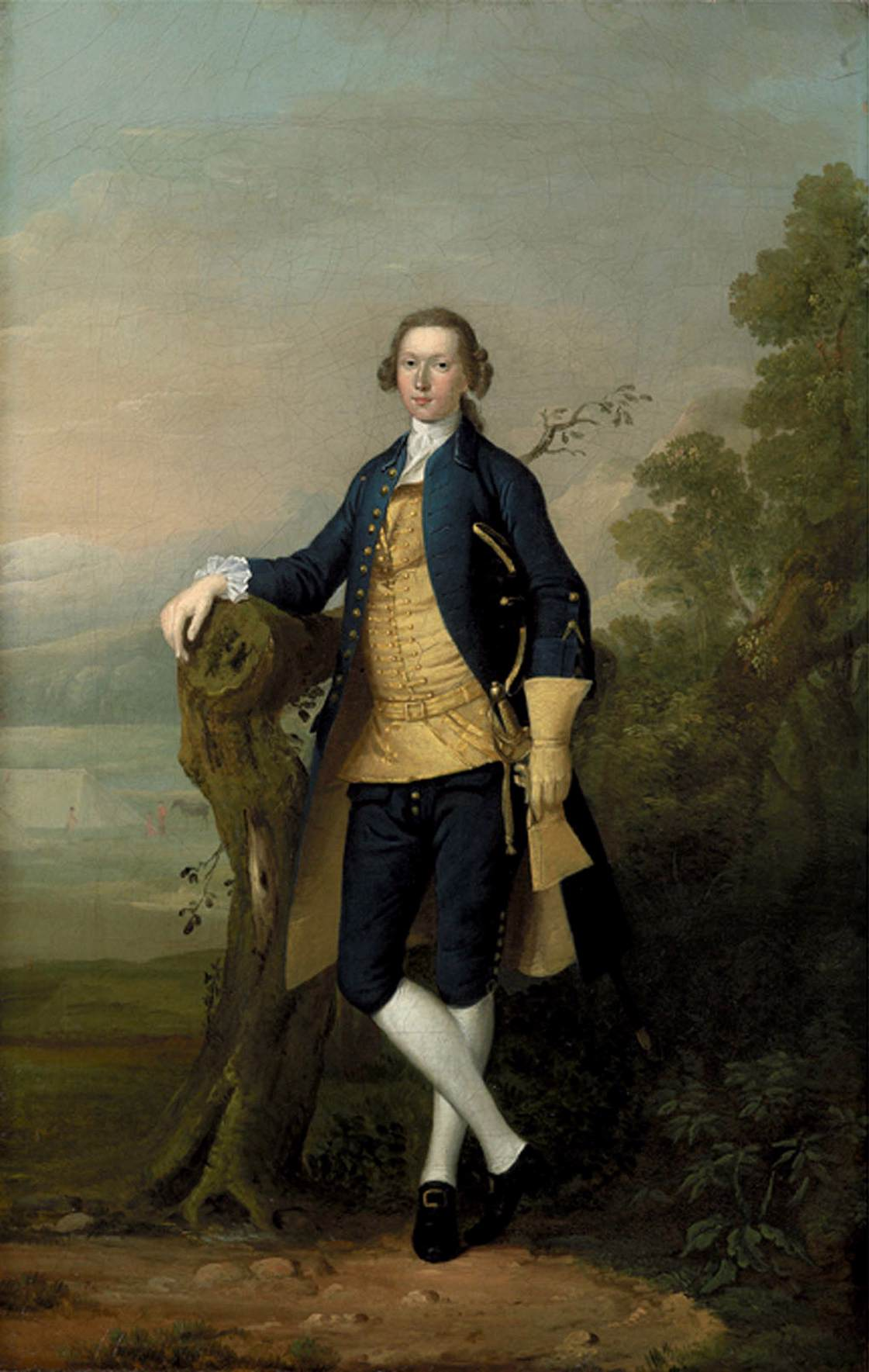
Lord Robert Kerr, painted 1741 by Arthur Devis

Lord Robert Kerr (died 16 April 1746) was a Scottish nobleman of the Clan Kerr and the second son of William Kerr, 3rd Marquess of Lothian. His family's surname at the time he lived was often also spelt as 'Ker'. He was killed at the Battle of Culloden.

He is thought to have gone on a grand tour of Europe between 1732 and 1739, on which he acquired the only surviving score of the Il Gran Mogul concerto by Vivaldi. He played the flute himself.

He was commissioned into the army in 1739 and fought on the Hanoverian Government side at the Battle of Culloden on 16 April 1746 as Captain of the Grenadiers in Barrell's Regiment. He is reported to have received the leading Highlander on the point of his spontoon, but then a second cut him through the head to chin, making him the only high-ranking Government soldier to be killed in the battle. Many accounts of Culloden cite Major Gillies MacBean of Lady Anne Mackintosh's regiment as the man who killed Lord Robert Kerr at Culloden, and this remains in the traditional historical memory of Clan MacBean.

His Great Uncle, General Lord Mark Kerr's regiment – 'Kerr's (11th) Dragoons' were also at Culloden.
