= Twelve Violin Sonatas, Op. 2 (Vivaldi) =

1709 sonatas

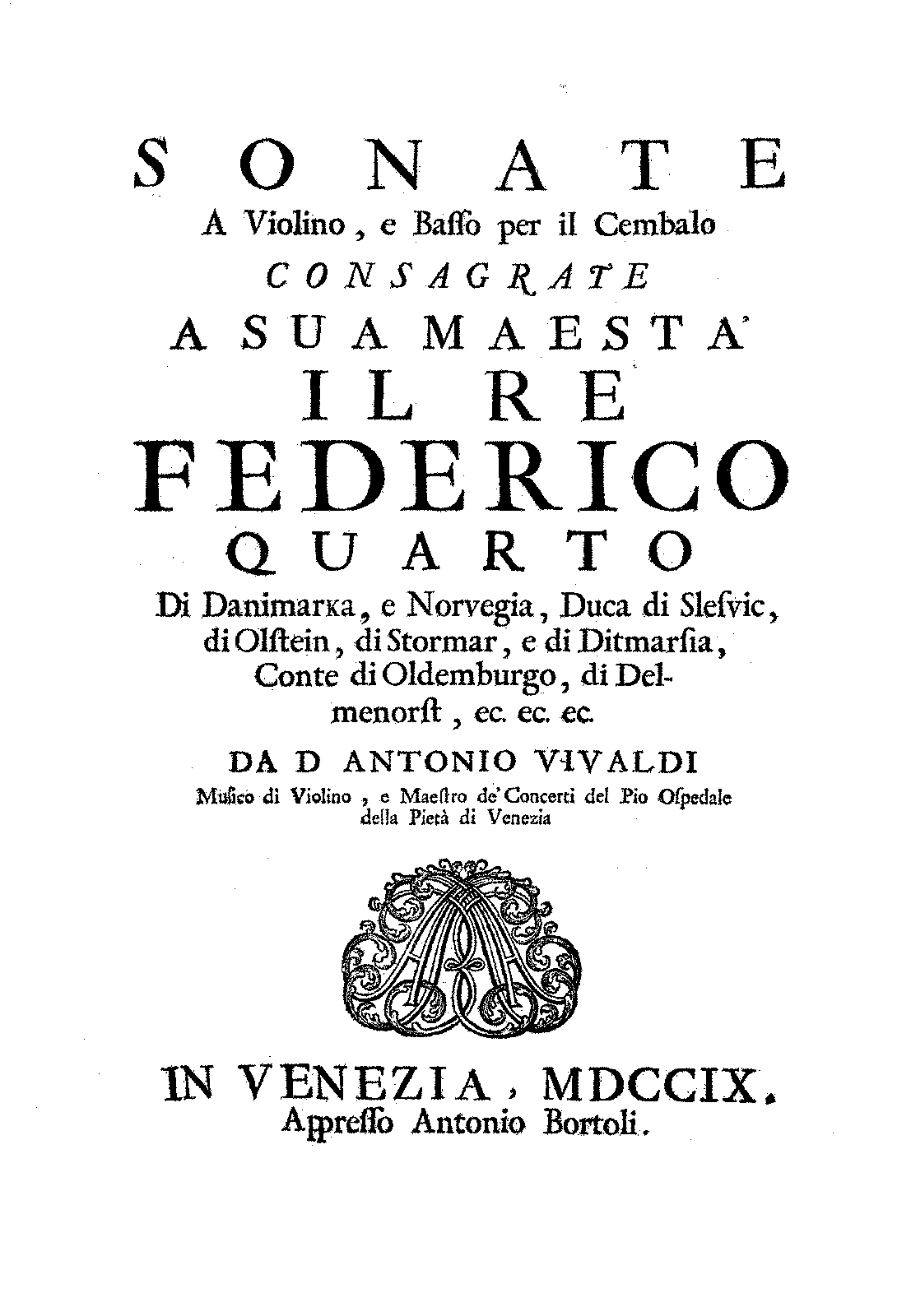
Vivaldi, Op. 2, 12 Violon Sonatas

Antonio Vivaldi wrote a set of Twelve Violin Sonatas, Op. 2, published in 1709. The sonatas are for violin and basso continuo. First published by Antonio Bortoli in Venice in 1709 (in movable type), the collection was later reprinted by Estienne Roger (who became Vivaldi's main publisher) in Amsterdam around 1712/13.

- Sonata No. 1 in G minor, RV 27
- Sonata No. 2 in A major, RV 31
- Sonata No. 3 in D minor, RV 14
- Sonata No. 4 in F major, RV 20
- Sonata No. 5 in B minor, RV 36
- Sonata No. 6 in C major, RV 1
- Sonata No. 7 in C minor, RV 8
- Sonata No. 8 in G major, RV 23
- Sonata No. 9 in E minor, RV 16
- Sonata No. 10 in F minor, RV 21
- Sonata No. 11 in D major, RV 9
- Sonata No. 12 in A minor, RV 32
