= La stravaganza =

Violin concertos by Antonio Vivaldi

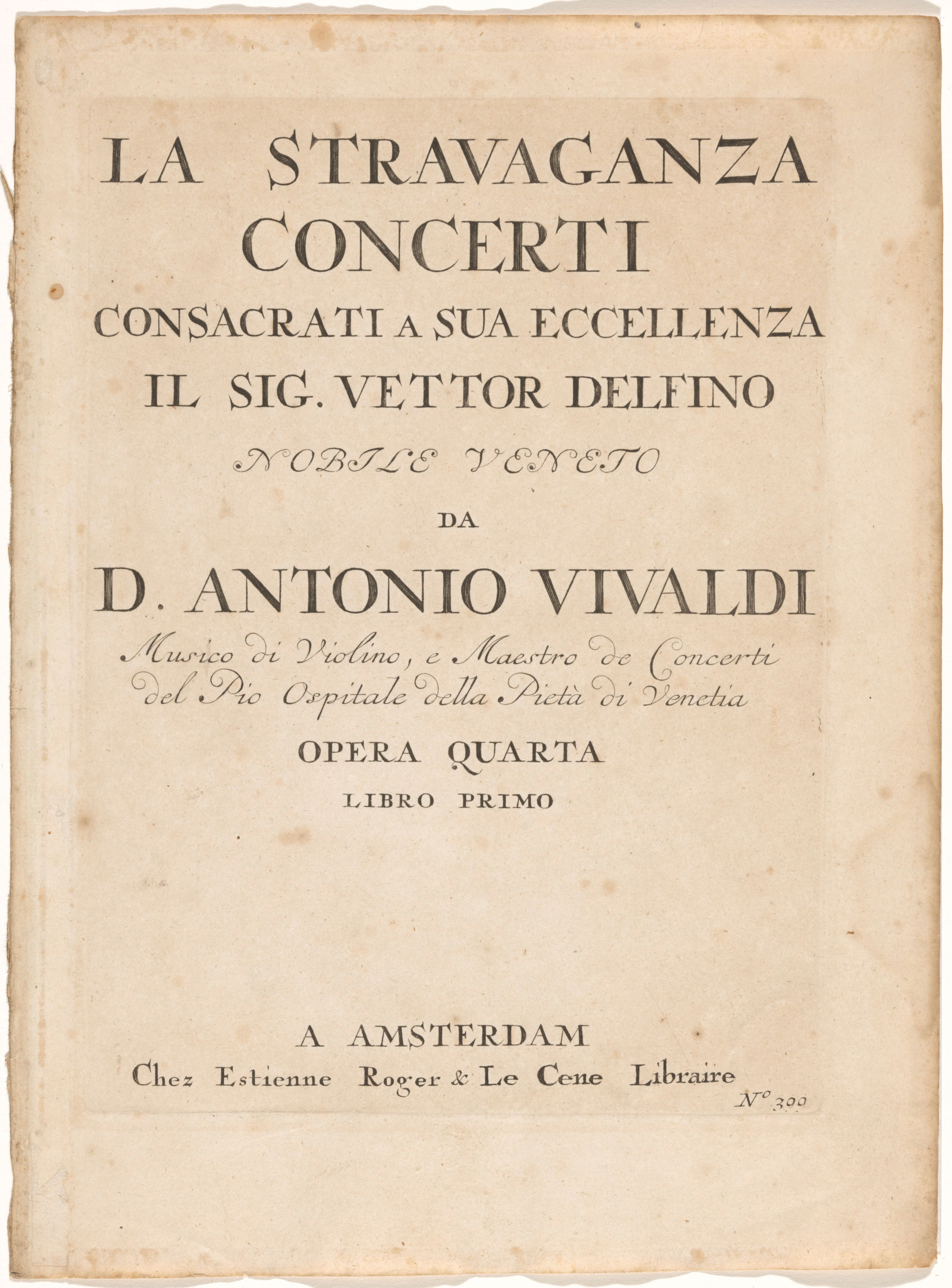
Title page

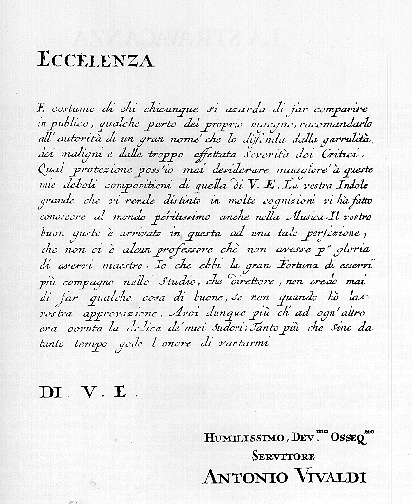
Dedication page

La stravaganza [literally 'Extravagance'] (The Eccentricity), Op. 4, is a set of concertos written by Antonio Vivaldi in 1712–13. The set was first published in 1716 in Amsterdam and was dedicated to Venetian nobleman Vettor Delfino, who had been a violin student of Vivaldi's. All of the concertos are scored for solo violin, strings, and basso continuo; however, some movements require extra soloists (such as a second violin and/or cello solo).

== List of concerti ==
- Concerto No. 1 in B♭ major, RV 383a:
1. Allegro
2. Largo e cantabile
3. Allegro
- Concerto No. 2 in E minor, RV 279:
1. Allegro
2. Largo
3. Allegro
- Concerto No. 3 in G major, RV 301:
1. Allegro
2. Largo
3. Allegro assai
- Concerto No. 4 in A minor, RV 357:
1. Allegro
2. Grave e sempre piano
3. Allegro
- Concerto No. 5 in A major, RV 347:
1. Allegro
2. Largo
3. Allegro (moderato)
- Concerto No. 6 in G minor, RV 316a:
1. Allegro
2. Largo
3. Allegro
- Concerto No. 7 in C major, RV 185:
1. Largo
2. Allegro (molto)
3. Largo
4. Allegro
- Concerto No. 8 in D minor, RV 249:
1. Allegro – Adagio – Presto – Adagio
2. Allegro
- Concerto No. 9 in F major, RV 284:
1. Allegro
2. Largo
3. Allegro
- Concerto No. 10 in C minor, RV 196:
1. Spiritoso
2. Adagio
3. Allegro
- Concerto No. 11 in D major, RV 204:
1. Allegro
2. Largo
3. Allegro assai
- Concerto No. 12 in G major, RV 298:
1. Spiritoso e non presto
2. Largo
3. Allegro

== Notable recordings ==
- Vivaldi: La Stravaganza (12 Violin Concertos, Op. 4), Zino Vinnikov (Violin & Music Director), Soloists' Ensemble of the St. Petersburg Philharmonic Orchestra, September 2014.
- Vivaldi, La Stravaganza, Rachel Podger (Violin), Channel Classics, 2003, CCS SA 19503. This recording won the Gramophone Award for Best Baroque Recording of 2003.
