= Six Violin Concertos, Op. 6 (Vivaldi) =

Six Violin Concertos
- by Antonio Vivaldi
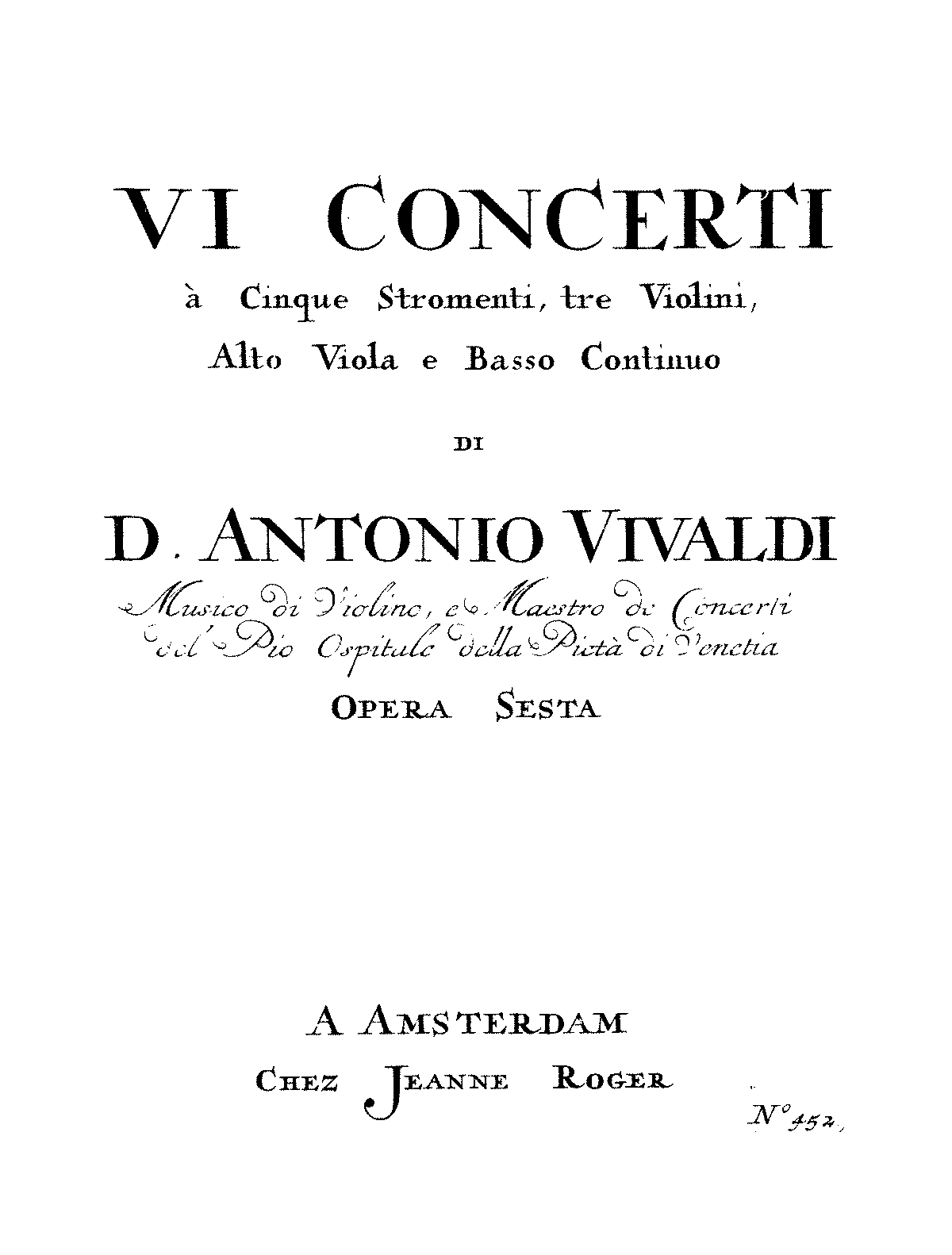
- Title page of the publication
- Opus: 6
- Published: c. 1719 in Amsterdam
- Scoring: violin; orchestra

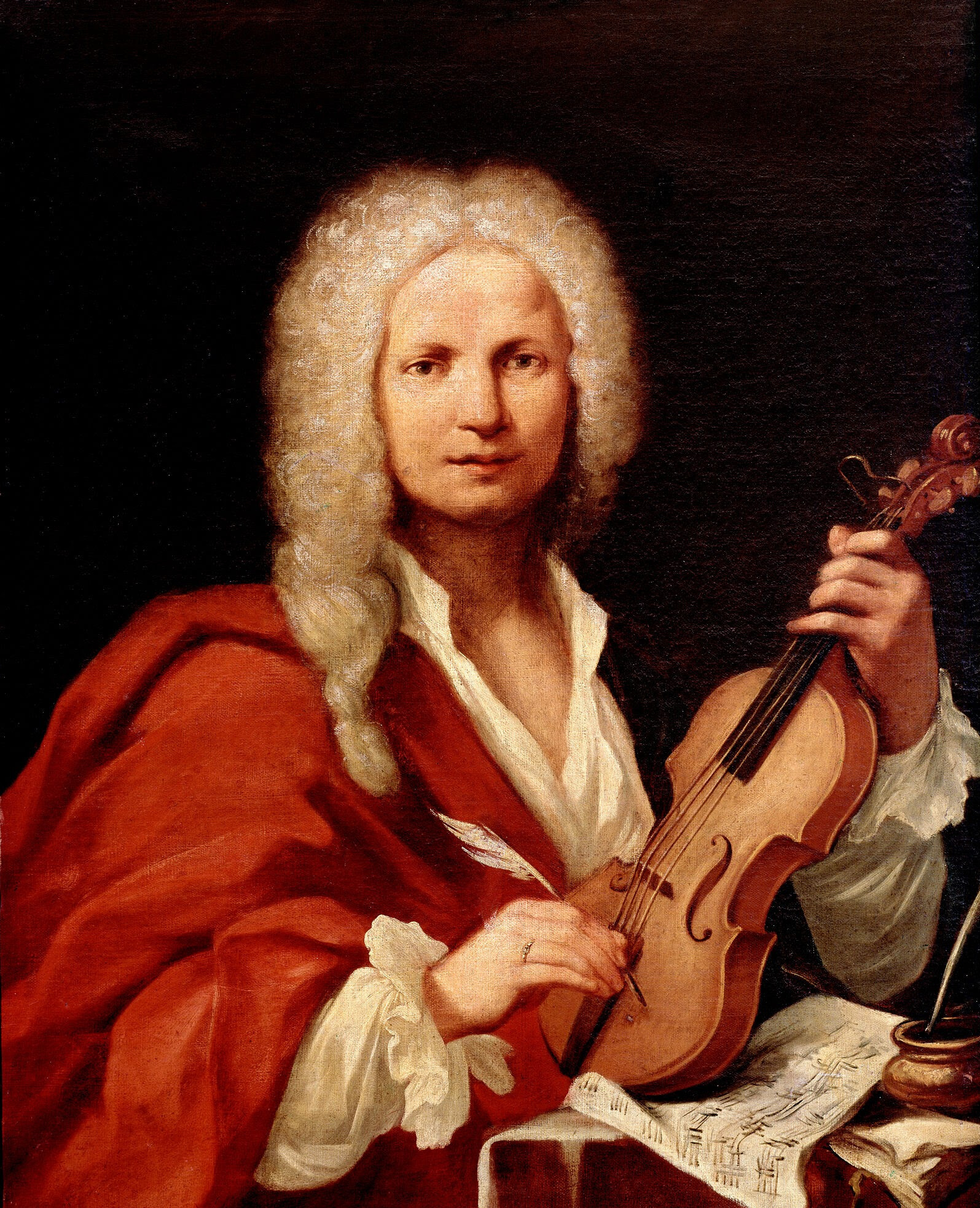
Vivaldi in 1723

The set of Six Violin Concerti, Op. 6, is a set of violin concertos written by Antonio Vivaldi in 1712–15. The set was first published in 1719 in Amsterdam.

- Concerto No. 1 in G minor, RV 324
1. Allegro
2. Grave
3. Allegro
- Concerto No. 2 in E♭ major, RV 259
1. Allegro
2. Largo
3. Allegro
- Concerto No. 3 in G minor, RV 318
1. Allegro
2. Adagio
3. Allegro
- Concerto No. 4 in D major, RV 216
1. Allegro
2. Adagio
3. Allegro
- Concerto No. 5 in E minor, RV 280
1. Allegro
2. Largo
3. Allegro
- Concerto No. 6 in D minor, RV 239
1. Allegro
2. Largo
3. Allegro
