= Six Violin Concertos, Op. 12 (Vivaldi) =

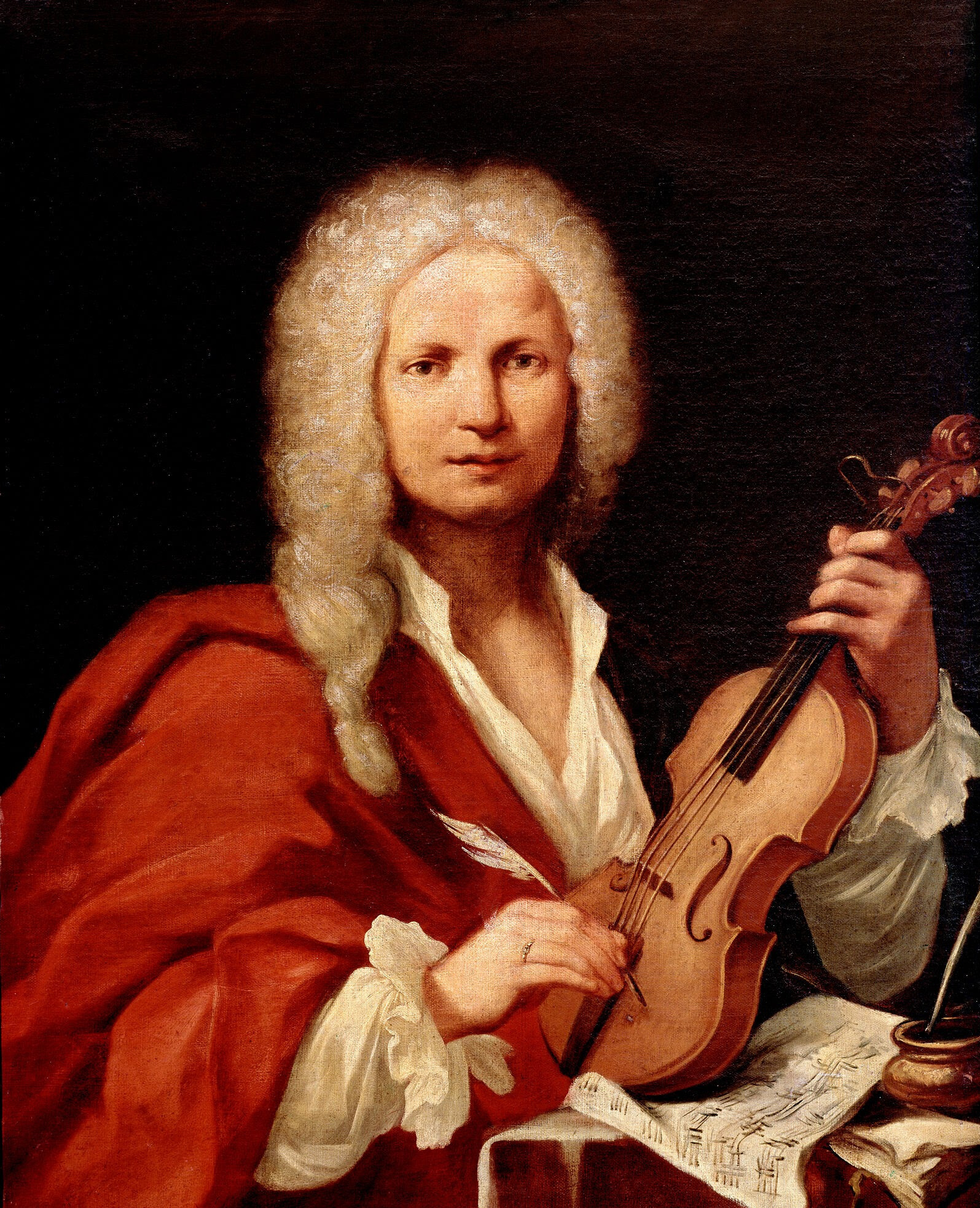
Antonio Vivaldi

Antonio Vivaldi wrote a set of concerti for violin, strings and continuo, Op. 12, in 1729.

- Concerto No. 1 in G minor, RV 317
1. Allegro
2. Largo
3. Allegro
- Concerto No. 2 in D minor, RV 244
1. Allegro
2. Larghetto
3. Allegro
- Concerto No. 3 in D major, RV 124
1. Allegro
2. Grave
3. Allegro
- Concerto No. 4 in C major, RV 173
1. Largo spiccato – Allegro
2. Largo
3. Allegro
- Concerto No. 5 in B♭ major, RV 379
1. Allegro
2. Largo
3. Allegro
- Concerto No. 6 in B♭ major, RV 361
1. Allegro
2. Largo
3. Allegro
