= Six Violin Sonatas, Op. 5 (Vivaldi) =

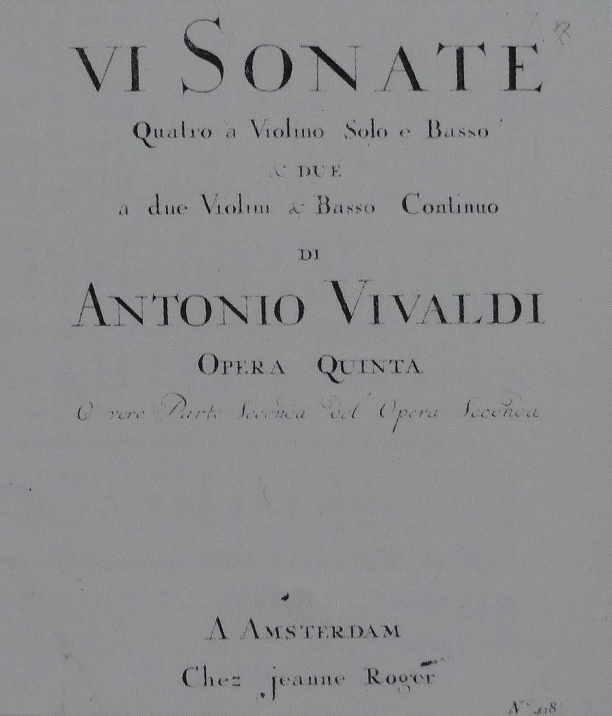
6 Sonatas, op.5

Antonio Vivaldi wrote a set of Six Violin Sonatas, Op. 5, in 1716. The set of violin sonatas are as follows:

- Sonata No. 1 for violin and basso continuo in F major, RV 18
1. Preludio
2. Corrente
3. Sarabanda
4. Giga
- Sonata No. 2 for violin and basso continuo in A major, RV 30
1. Preludio
2. Corrente
3. Gavotta
- Sonata No. 3 for violin and basso continuo in B♭ major, RV 33
1. Preludio
2. Alllemanda
3. Corrente
4. Gavotta
- Sonata No. 4 for violin and basso continuo in B minor, RV 35
1. Preludio
2. Allemanda
3. Corrente
- Sonata No. 5 for 2 violins and basso continuo in B♭ major, RV 76
1. Preludio
2. Allemanda
3. Corrente
- Sonata No. 6 for 2 violins and basso continuo in G minor, RV 72
1. Preludio
2. Allemanda
3. Air
4. Minuetto
