= Twelve Trio Sonatas, Op. 1 (Vivaldi) =

Set of trio sonatas by Antonio Vivaldi

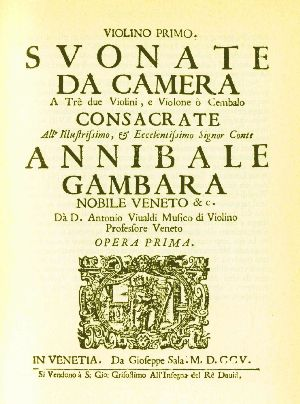
Twelve Trio Sonatas, Op. 1

Twelve Trio Sonatas, Op. 1 is a collection of trio sonatas composed by Antonio Vivaldi, and published by the Venetian publisher Giuseppe Sala in 1705, the first edition is believed to have been published around 1703. The trio sonatas are scored for two violins and basso continuo. The last sonata, nicknamed "La Follia", is a theme and variations on the theme of the same name.

The sonatas are listed below.

- Sonata No. 1 in G minor, RV 73
- Sonata No. 2 in E minor, RV 67
- Sonata No. 3 in C major, RV 61
- Sonata No. 4 in E major, RV 66
- Sonata No. 5 in F major, RV 69
- Sonata No. 6 in D major, RV 62
- Sonata No. 7 in E♭ major, RV 65
- Sonata No. 8 in D minor, RV 64
- Sonata No. 9 in A major, RV 75
- Sonata No. 10 in B♭ major, RV 78
- Sonata No. 11 in B minor, RV 79
- Sonata No. 12 in D minor "La Follia", RV 63

The final sonata is a set of variations on the famous "Folia" theme.
