= Michel-Charles Le Cène =

French printer

Michel-Charles Le Cène (ca. 1684 Honfleur, Province of Normandy, France ‐ 29 April 1743 in Amsterdam) was a French and Dutch printer. His house printed the first editions of works by composers such as Vivaldi and Handel, and pieces such as Vivaldi's Four Seasons. The workshop was in Amsterdam.

== Life ==
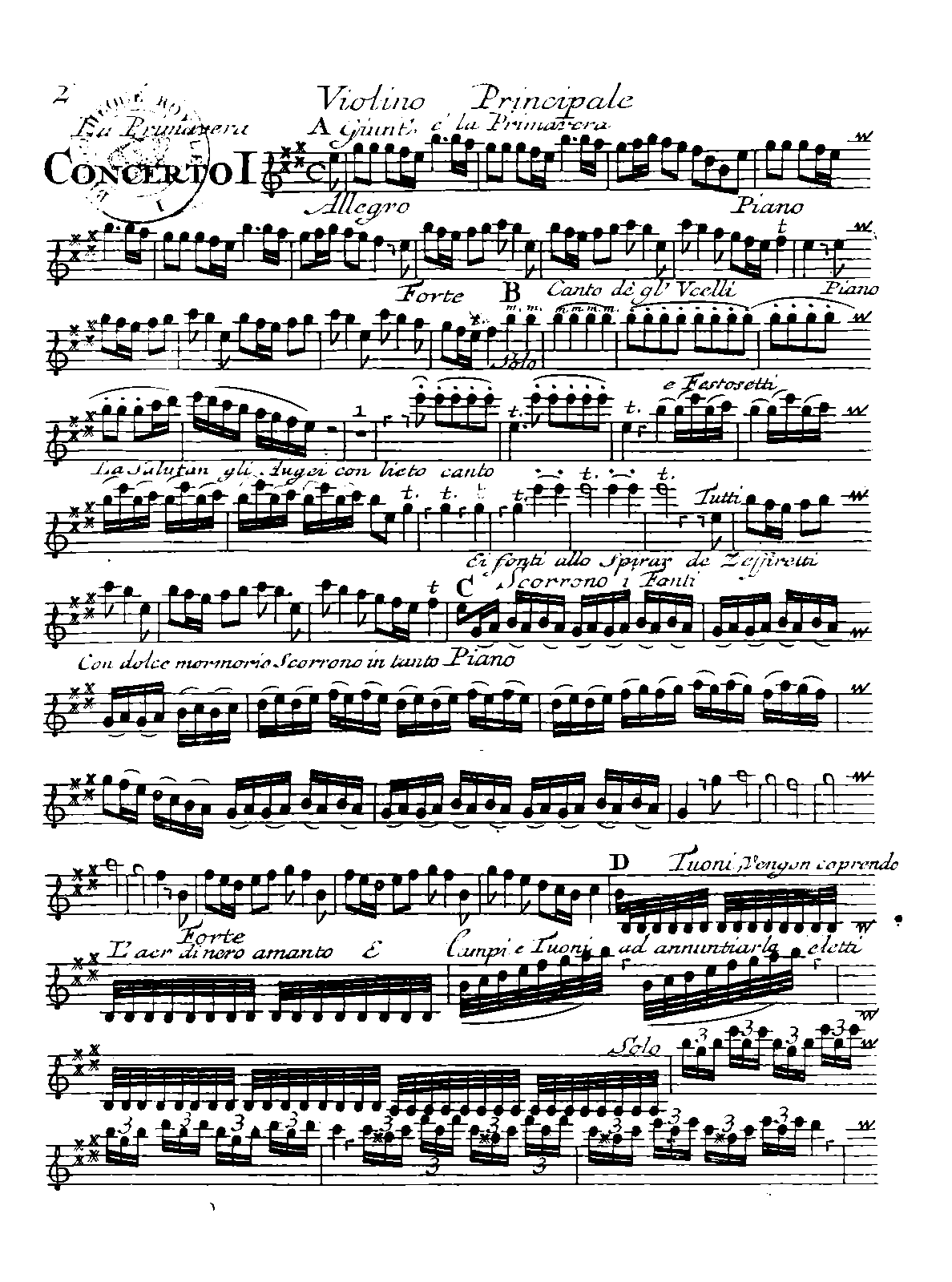
The first edition version of the Four Seasons by Vivaldi, published in 1725 by Michel-Charles Le Cène in Amsterdam.

After the annulment of the edict of Nantes in 1685, Le Cène's French, Huguenot family moved to the Netherlands. He married Françoise Roger (1694–1723) in 1716, the daughter of Estienne Roger, a music publisher famous in Amsterdam, whose company he joined. He created his own music publishing company by up to 1720. Rodger died in 1722, and his two successors died up to a few months after that. A year later, Le Cène acquired the company.

For the 20 years of the company under his thumb, he oversaw the publishing of works by composers such as Geminiani, Handel, Locatelli (with whom he was a friend), Quantz, Tartini, Giovanni Mossi, Vivaldi, and Telemann. He became friends with Locatelli. His publishing enjoyed success all over Europe, especially in France, England, Germany, and Holland.

The company was bought by E. J. de la Coste, a book dealer, after Le Cène's death in 1743. IMSLP writes that Coste "issued no reprints apart from a list of the works published by Roger and Le Cène". Not too long after that, Coste sold the company to Antoine Chareau, who used to work for Le Cène. The company was dissolved two years later.
