= Ryom-Verzeichnis =

Standard catalogue of the music of Antonio Vivaldi

The Ryom-Verzeichnis or Ryom Verzeichnis (both often abbreviated RV) is the standard catalogue of the music of Antonio Vivaldi created by Danish musicologist Peter Ryom. Verzeichnis is the German word for catalogue. First published in 1973 under the title Antonio Vivaldi: Table de Concordances des Œuvres (RV), the Ryom-Verzeichnis has existed in several forms over the course of its development. The catalogue is often used to identify Vivaldi's works by a simple number.

RV numbers below 741 were assigned systematically, with vocal works following 585 instrumental ones; as additional works are discovered or confirmed, they are assigned numbers above 740. Instrumental works were first sorted by category, instrumentation and key (beginning with C Major), and then assigned sequential numbers. For example, Vivaldi's celebrated Four Seasons, made up of four violin concertos (not sequentially numbered because they are in different keys), and his famous lute concerto are named and numbered as follows:

- Concerto No. 1 in E major, Op. 8, RV 269 – "La primavera" (Spring)
- Concerto No. 2 in G minor, Op. 8, RV 315 – "L'estate" (Summer)
- Concerto No. 3 in F major, Op. 8, RV 293 – "L'autunno" (Autumn)
- Concerto No. 4 in F minor, Op. 8, RV 297 – "L'inverno" (Winter)
- Lute Concerto in D major, RV 93

Earlier catalogues of Vivaldi's work exist. Marc Pincherle (Paris, 1948) only contained instrumental works. Mario Rinaldi (1945) described the entire oeuvre, but the catalogue contained numerous errors and had a whimsical numbering. The classification according to the Italian music publisher Ricordi was also incomplete because it only contained their own published work. When the complete index of Antonio Fanna was finished (Milan, 1968), Ryom had already begun to work on his catalogue; therefore, a supplement appeared in Fanna's catalogue, containing previously unknown items that Ryom had discovered in the meantime. Fanna's catalogue, however, only includes instrumental works.

For the sake of concordance, the Ryom Verzeichnis provides reference to the numbers of Fanna (F.), Pincherle (P.), and Ricordi.

Ryom first considered to call his classification Vivaldi-Werke-Verzeichnis, abbreviated VWV, analogous to the Bach-Werke-Verzeichnis (BWV). After consulting a scientific colleague, he decided to link his own name to the catalogue and chose Ryom-Verzeichnis.

Ryom continued to work on the catalogue at intervals after 1974. He continued to study manuscripts, cataloguing newly discovered and newly assigned works, describing insights into orchestration and analysis of authenticity. This eventually led to a major revision in 2007 with the publication of Antonio Vivaldi. Thematic-Systematics Verzeichnis Signaller Work (RV). A total of 809 works are included.

In July 2007 Peter Ryom appointed Italian musician Federico Maria Sardelli to continue his work of cataloguing the music of Antonio Vivaldi, and since then the latter has been responsible for the Ryom-Verzeichnis (RV).

== See also ==
- List of compositions by Antonio Vivaldi
- List of operas by Antonio Vivaldi
- Opus number
- Köchel catalogue
