= Il teatro alla moda =

1720 pamphlet by Benedetto Marcello

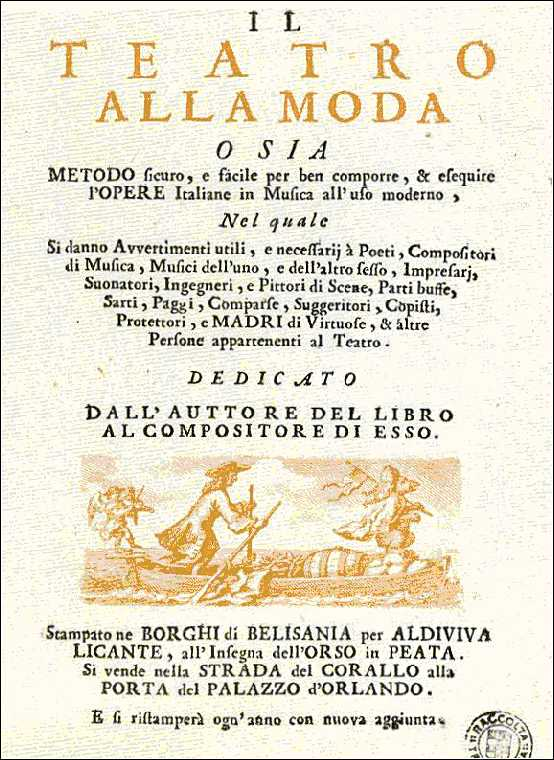
Title page of Il teatro alla moda

Il teatro alla moda (The Fashionable Theater) is a satirical pamphlet in which its author, the Venetian composer Benedetto Marcello (1686–1739), vents his critical opinions on the milieu of the Italian opera seria in the first decades of the eighteenth century. It was first published anonymously in Venice by the end of 1720. Virtually every aspect of opera seria and its social environment is mercilessly criticized by Marcello: the artificiality of plots, the stereotyped format of music, the extravagant scenography and machinery, the inability and venality of composers and poets, the vanity and vulgarity of singers, the avidity of impresarios, the ineptitude of musicians. It is obvious that Marcello's polemic was prompted by visits to the Teatro Sant'Angelo and Teatro San Moisè in Venice in October 1720, when performances of Antonio Vivaldi's opera La verità in cimento were given at the Sant'Angelo and performances of Giuseppe Maria Buini's opera Il Filindo were given at the San Moisè. This is revealed by a veiled reference in anagram to Vivaldi on the title page, along with references to six female singers (with names set off in capital letters) who appeared in the two operas, three in Vivaldi's opera and three in Buini's opera.

== Full title and writing style ==
The full title reads "THE FASHIONABLE THEATER – OR – safe and easy METHOD for correctly composing and performing Italian OPERAS in the modern style, – In which – useful and necessary Advice is given to Librettists, Composers, Musicians of both sexes, Impresarios, Performers, Engineers, and Scene Painters, comic Characters, Tailors, Pages, Dancers, Prompters, Copyists, Protectors, and MOTHERS of female Virtuoso singers, & other People belonging to Theater." In fact, Il teatro alla moda is written as a series of chapters where advice is ironically given to the various people involved in operatic productions, in order to meet "the modern customs" and bizarre requirements of such theatrical events.

== Anagrams and personal references ==
The title page contains several allusions to well-known protagonists of the Venetian theater of the time. The publisher's name, "Aldiviva Licante", refers, by means of anagrams, both to Antonio Vivaldi, then very famous as an opera composer, and to the Bolognese singer Caterina Cantelli. Five female singers are referenced in veiled terms without anagrams by means of capital letters. Three of them are Bolognese, consistent with Marcello's prejudice against singers of that background: Antonia Maria Laurenti, Caterina Borghi, and Cecilia Belisani. The two non-Bolognese singers are Anna Maria Strada, a native of Bergamo, and Chiara Orlandi, a native of Mantua. In an interesting symmetrical twist, Marcello included mention in his title page of exactly three female singers who appeared in the recent production of Vivaldi's opera La verità in cimento (Laurenti, Strada, and Orlandi) and three singers, all Bolognese, who appeared in the recent production of Buini's opera Il Filindo (Cantelli, Borghi, and Belisani). Laurenti is identified with the word "Corallo", a corruption of her married name Coralli (she was often referred to in the operatic world as "la Coralli"). One of the librettists for Vivaldi's opera, Giovanni Palazzi, is also referenced in the same manner as the singers, as is the composer Giovanni Porta, whose opera Teodorico was produced at the Teatro San Giovanni Grisostomo in November 1720.

== Surrealism ==
The text of Il teatro alla moda displays several striking features. To begin with, it shows a degree of vacillation in attitude toward its subject – perhaps resulting from Marcello's personal ambivalence regarding operatic music, as both a critic and a composer. For example, the dedicatory is by "the author of the book to its composer." In addition, it exhibits a number of surrealistic elements, which reach a climax in the last chapter, "The Raffle" (presumably organized by the mother of a young female singer), where the prizes include "a full dress of modern poet in fever-colored tree bark, wrapped with metaphors, translations, hyperboles" as well as "the pen that wrote Il teatro alla moda." The printing accompanies these peculiarities with a chaotic use of italic and normal typography and of capital fonts.

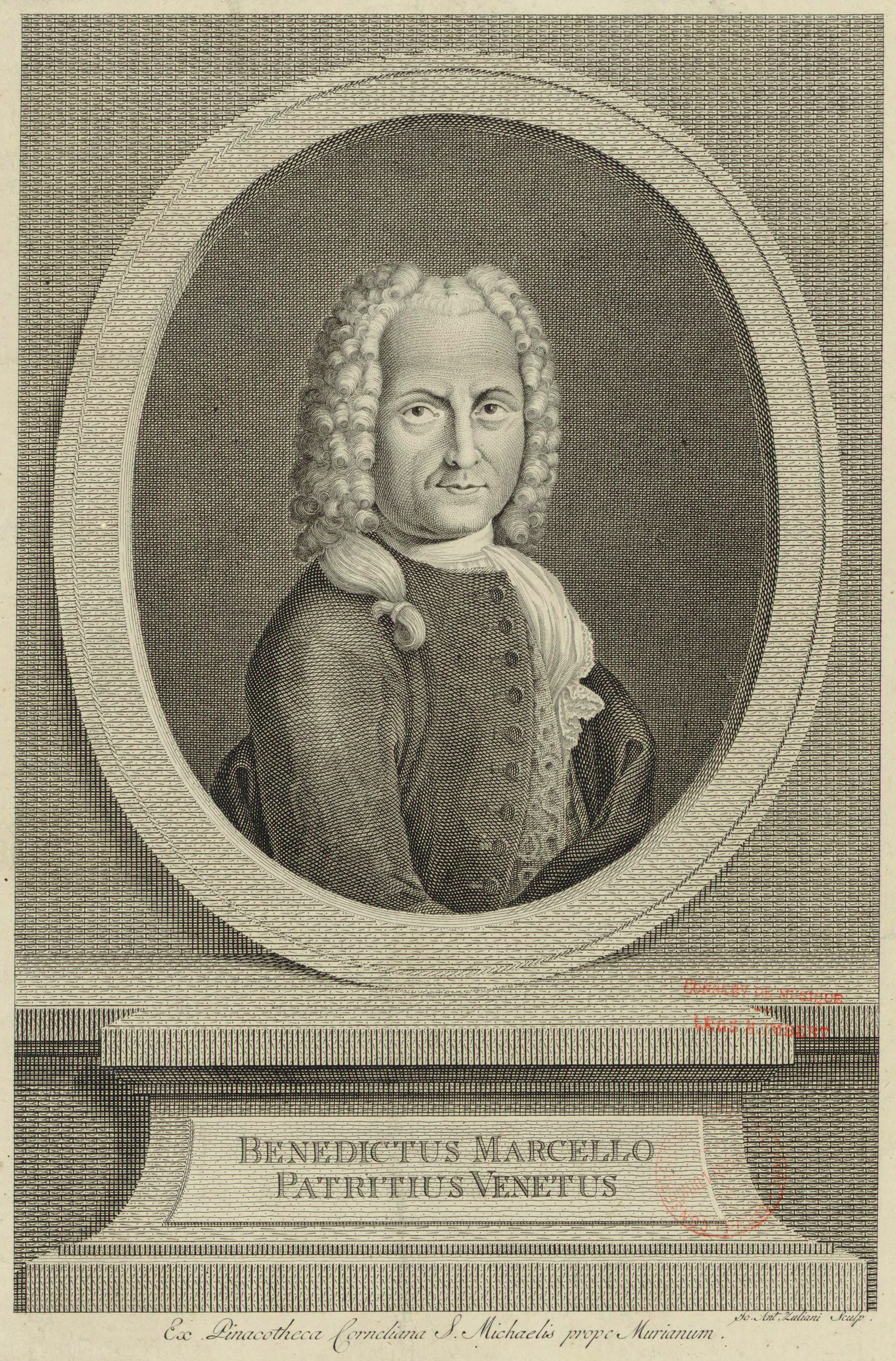
Benedetto Marcello

== Translated excerpts (typography preserved) ==
"To the Poets – In the first place, the modern Poet should not have read and should never read the ancient Authors, Latin or Greek. And this is because the ancient Greeks or Latins have never read the moderns."

"To the Music Composers – The modern Music Composer should possess no knowledge about the Rules of good composition, except for some principle of universal practice... He should not understand the numeric Musical Proportions, nor the optimal effect of contrary Motions, or the bad Relation of Tritones and augmented Intervals."

"To the Singers – It is not necessary that the VIRTUOSO can read, or write, or have a good pronunciation of vowels, and of single and double Consonants, or understand the sense of Words, etc., but it is better if he mistakes Senses, Letters, Syllables, etc., in order to perform Ornaments, Trills, Appoggiature, very long Cadences, etc. etc. etc."

"To the Mothers of Female Singers – When the Girls have an audition with the Impresario, they (the mothers) will move the mouth with them, will prompt them the usual Ornaments and Trills and, asked about the age of the Virtuosa, will cut down at least ten years."
