= Anna Girò =

18th-century Italian mezzo-soprano

Anna Girò (also Girrò or Giraud) (c. 1710—c. 1748 or later), also known as l'Annina del Prete Rosso, la Nina del Prete Rosso, or l'Annina della Pietà, was the stage name of Anna Maria(?) Maddalena Tessieri (or Tesieri, Teseire or Testeiré), an Italian mezzo-soprano/contralto of the 18th century. She is best remembered for her numerous collaborations with composer Antonio Vivaldi who wrote operatic roles for her. She is the singer who performed the greatest number of Vivaldi's operas, the one who kept them in her repertoire the longest time and who made them known across the largest geographical area.

== Early life and career ==
=== Mantua ===
Girò was born in Mantua in 1710 or a few years earlier. She was the daughter of a wig maker of French descent called Pietro, whose surname Giraud was made into Girò in italian and passed onto the offspring in its italianized graphy. Her mother was Bartolomea, widow of Giacomo Trevisan.

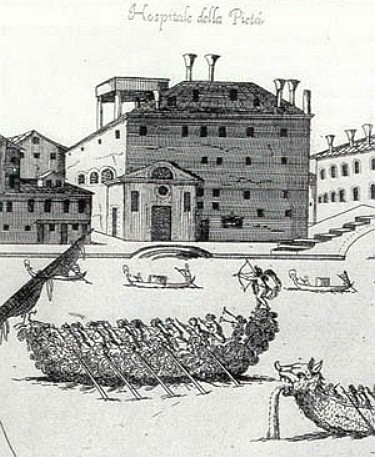
Ospedale della Pietà (source unknown). The building no longer exists.

=== Venice ===
At twelve she was sent to Venice to study singing. There, she was welcomed by her half-sister Paolina who was twenty years her senior and already a resident there. (Paolina assisted Anna throughout her career.) Still very young, Girò made her debut in Treviso in 1723 and in Venice in 1724. She first sang roles en travesti and soon female roles followed. With her musical and acting talents she conquered the Venetian Opera Stage in a single year.She soon started a close professional collaboration with Antonio Vivaldi. She had been his student, was now his protégée, and soon would be his favorite prima donna.

=== Meeting Vivaldi ===
Girò may have become acquainted with Vivaldi during his time in Mantua between 1718 and 1720. She was then an aspiring young singer and she may have been his student there. In any case, it is fair to assume that she would have met Antonio Vivaldi and sang some of his music for the first time between 1720 and 1723, as, by then, she was a student at the famous Ospedale della pietà, an "orphanage-cum-conservatoire where he was composer in residence". Vivaldi had recently been promoted to the specially created office of Maestro de' Concerti and was in charge of the Figlie di Choro (the musicians), the élite of the Pietà. It is not clear though how Girò was enrolled for the Pietà was "a home for abandoned and unwanted babies, not (as is often stated) a convent or a school for girls". Part of Vivaldi's job was to train those girls to sing and play instruments during services at La Pietà. Under his direction the choro became so famous that they attracted visitors from across Europe and a visit to the Pietà had become a feature of the Grand Tour. (Vivaldi wrote many works for the girls of this establishment (and of course when Girò was a student there), including, for instance, the Kyrie RV587, the Dixit RV594, the Domine RV593 etc.).

=== Dorilla in Tempe ===
Dorilla in Tempe, which premiered at the Teatro Sant' Angelo in Venice on 9 November 1726, was the first opera by Vivaldi to include Girò in its cast. In this opera she sings the role of Eudamia, the seconda donna. The arias written for her by Vivaldi were made to fit her singing abilities perfectly. (Her voice was not strong, but she was attractive and acted well.) For Girò – who will go through thick and thin with him for a long time – he gives priority to sincerity over virtuosity. The captivating aria "Al mio amore il tuo risponda" from act 1, scene 8, which she would have performed for the first time here, would be included in other future operas. The plaintive "Il povero mio core"from act 3, scene 4 🎼, although interpreted by Angela Capuano as Dorilla at the premiere, was reprised by Girò as an aria di baule that she would sing throughout her career. (The arie di baule or "suitcase arias" are an integral part of the traveling singers' luggage. They had them ready at every opportunity.)Dorilla in Tempe was well received and became especially popular with its choirs and ballets. It also became one of Vivaldi's personal favorites. Girò appeared in nearly all his operas after that.

== Repertoire ==
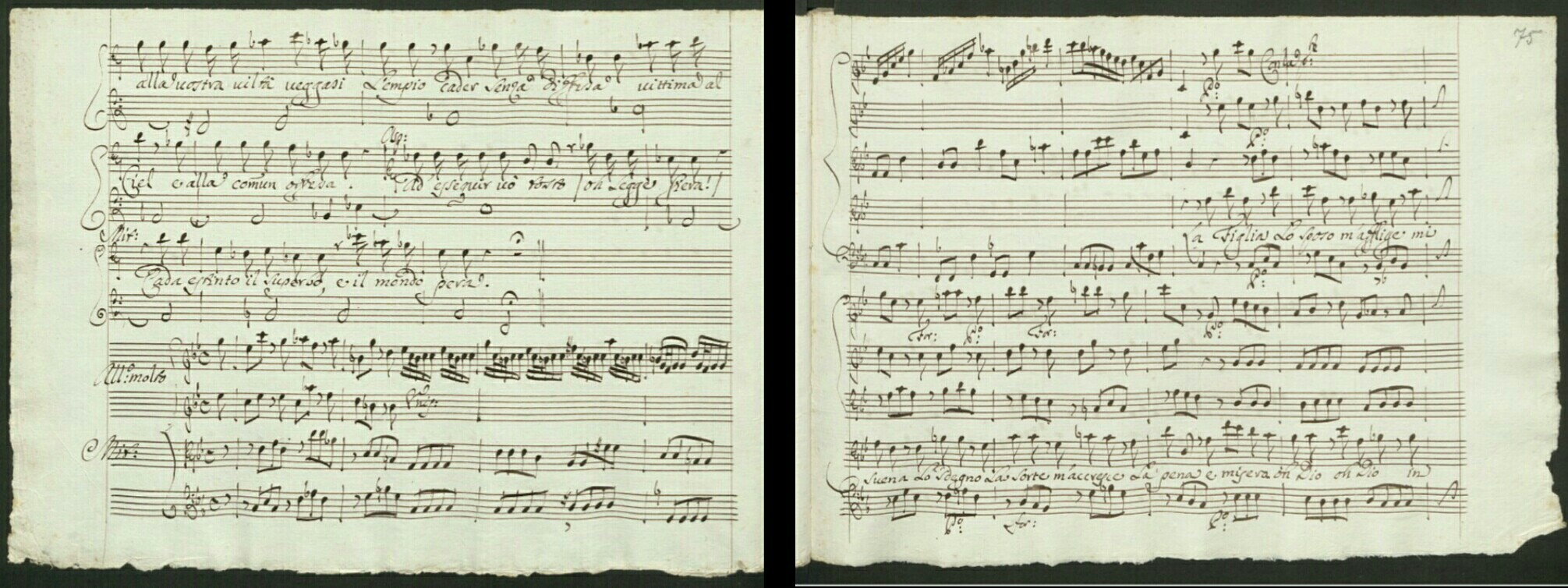
The first two pages of the aria "La figlia, lo sposo" written specifically for Girò. This aria concludes the second act of Vivaldi's Motezuma. The music of Motezuma was thought to have been lost in its entirety, but fragments of it, among which this aria, were discovered in 2002 in the archive of the music library of the Sing-Akademie zu Berlin.

=== Performances in chronological order ===
Year	City	Work	Composer	Role	Male / female role	Premiere or revival	Additional notes
1723	Treviso	La ninfa infelice e fortunata	Giuseppe Boniventi. (Completed by Giacomo Maccari and Antonio Vivaldi)	Mirtillo	M	premiere	Frontispiece and cast from the libretto of the 1723 Treviso premiere of La Ninfa Infelice e Fortunata. Girò made her debut in this pastoral opera. She played the role of "Mirtillo, pastore amante di Filli" (Mirtillo, shepherd in love with Filli) as "La Sig. Anna Giro di Mantova" (Miss Anna Girò from Mantua). Her first professional role was en travesti.
1724	Venice	Laodice	Tomaso Albinoni	Clistene	M	premiere	
1724	Venice	Il nemico amante	Giuseppe Maria Buini, Fortunato Chelleri, Antonio, K. Di Gaspari (?)	Idalma	F	revised version	pasticcio (?)
1725	Venice	Agide re di Sparta	Giovanni Porta	Filoastro	M	premiere	Frontispiece and cast from the libretto of the 1726 production of Giovanni Porta's Agide, Re di Sparta. Girò appears under the role of "Filoastro, Principe amante di Antianira, Capitano delle guardie reali" (Filoastro, Prince in love with Antianira, Captain of the royal guards) as "La Sig. Anna Girò Mantovana" (Ms Anna Girò, Mantuan). This is another breeches role for Girò. Giovanni Porta's name appears preceded by del celebre (by the famous).
1725	Venice	Li sdegni cangiati in amore	Giuseppe Maria Buini	Evanco	M	premiere	
1726	Venice	Dorilla in Tempe	Antonio Vivaldi	Eudamia	F	premiere	Frontispiece and cast from the libretto of the 1726 premiere of Vivaldi's Dorilla in Tempe. Girò appears under the role of "Eudamia, ninfa amante non corrisposta d'Elmiro" (Eudamia, nymph, feeling unrequited love for Elmiro). Vivaldi's name appears preceded by del celebre (by the famous).
1726	Venice	Medea e Giasone	Francesco Brusa	Isifile	F	premiere	
1727	Venice	Farnace	Antonio Vivaldi	Tamiri	F	premiere	
1727	Milan	Tamerlano	Giovanni Antonio Giaì	Irene	F	premiere	
1727	Venice	Orlando Furioso	Antonio Vivaldi	Alcina	F	premiere	
1728	Venice	Rosilena ed Oronta	Antonio Vivaldi	Oronta	F	premiere	Frontispiece and cast from the libretto of the 1728 premiere of Vivaldi's Rosilena ed Oronta at the Sant'Angelo Theatre in Venice. This dramma per musica (musical drama) was put together for the Carnival. Girò sings "Oronta, Reina vedova d'Armenia" (Oronta, widowed Queen of Armenia), a seconda donna role. Vivaldi had already written a prima donna role for her in Farnace (Tamiri) the year before. But Oronta, if not a prima donna role, is still one of the title characters.
1728	Venice	Gl'odi delusi dal sangue	Baldassare Galuppi and Giovanni Battista Pescetti. (Galuppi wrote the music for acts 1 and 3, whilst Pescetti wrote the music for act 2.)	Evandro	M	premiere	Frontispiece and cast from the libretto of the 1728 premier of Gallupi's and Pescetti's Gl'Odj Delusi dal Sangue. Girò is once again playing a role en travesti: "Evandro, creduto figlio d'Oreste poi scoperto figlio di Mezenzio, amante di Turia" (Evandro, thought to be Oreste's son, then revealed to be Mezenzio's son, in love with Tiria).
1728	Bologna	Teodorico	Giuseppe Maria Buini	Clotilde	F	premiere	
1729	Florence	L'Atenaide	Antonio Vivaldi	Pulcheria	F	premiere	
1729	Florence	Catone in Utica	Leonardo Vinci	Emilia	F	revival	Frontispiece and cast from the libretto of the 1729 production of Leonardo Vinci's Catone in Utica in Florence. Girò is listed under the role of "Emilia, vedova di Pompeo" (Emilia, widow of Pompey) as "La Signora Anna Girò di Venezia" (Ms Anna Girò from Venice). In this production Girò is reprising a female role which was created the year before by the castrato Giovanni Ossi ("Il Sig. Giovanni Ossi, virtuoso di S.E. il Sig. prencipe Borghese").
1730	Milan	Ezio	Luca Antonio Predieri(?), Giuseppe Ferdinando Brivio (?)	Onoria	F	premiere	pasticcio (?)
1730	Milan	Semiramide riconosciuta	Geminiano Giacomelli	Tamiri	F	premiere	
1730	Venice	Dalisa	Johann Adolf Hasse	Edita	F	premiere	Girò shared the stage with two stars: Faustina Hasse (Bordoni) and Angelo Amorevoli.
1731	Turin	Ezio	Riccardo Broschi	Onoria	F	premiere	Frontispiece and cast from the libretto of the 1731 production of Riccardo Broschi's Ezio in Turin. Girò is listed under the role of "Onoria, sorella di Valentiniano, amante occulta d'Ezio" (Onoria, Valentiniano's sister, secretly in love with Ezio) as "La Signora Anna Girò Veneziana" (Ms Anna Girò, Venetian). In this production Girò shares the stage with a star-studded cast: the soprano castrato Farinelli, the mezzo-soprano Faustina Hasse (Bordoni), the bass Antonio Montagnana, the tenor Angiolo Amorevoli, all of whom sing in cities and capitals all over Europe.
1731	Turin	Poro	Nicola Porpora	Erissena	F	premiere	This production had the exact same star-studded cast as Riccardo Broschi's Ezio, produced also in Turin in 1731.
1731	Pavia	Farnace	Antonio Vivaldi	Tamiri	F	revival	
1732	Mantua	Semiramide	Antonio Vivaldi	Semiramide	F	premiere	
1732	Mantua	Farnace	Antonio Vivaldi	Tamiri	F	revival	
1733	Venice	Motezuma	Antonio Vivaldi	Mitrane	F	premiere	
1734	Verona	Lucio Papirio dittatore	Geminiano Giacomelli	Papiria	F	revival	role originally created by Faustina Bordini in 1729
1734	Verona	Arsace	Giuseppe Maria Orlandini	Statira	F	revival	
1735	Verona	L'Adelaide	Antonio Vivaldi	Adelaide	F	premiere	Frontispiece, cast, and Adelaide's aria (act 1, scene 16) from the libretto of Vivaldi's opera Adelaide. The role of "Adelaide, Vedova di Lontario, Reina d'Italia" (Lontario's widow, Queen of Italy) was created by Girò in 1735 at the Carnaval in Verona. Text of the aria: "You are much too easy to believe, Warrior. Every hour this pale face of yours, this trembling gait show you coward and false. In my chest there is a tenacious heart. Do you want to see how strong it is? You ruthless and haughty one!". Like almost the entire opera L'Adelaide, the music to this aria is lost.
1735	Verona	Tamerlano aka Bajazet	Antonio Vivaldi	Asteria	F	premiere	pasticcio
1735	Venice	Griselda	Antonio Vivaldi	Griselda	F	premiere	Frontispiece, cast and the famous scene 7, act 1 from the libretto of the 1735 original production of Vivaldi's Griselda. Originally, Vivaldi considered the opera's subject to be too "plebeian" for the Venetian theatres. In the end, Griselda turned into a vehicle for Girò (for whom Vivaldi composed the title role). The libretto, written by Carlo Goldoni, was a subject of tension between the playwright and the composer. One of the points of contention was Vivaldi's incessant requests for Goldoni to revise the text again and again to make it fit Girò's vocal limitations. Text of scene 12 which concludes act 1: (Griselda is alone) "Unfortunate Griselda! What is there left for me to fear? Ah! I wish I could, but I do not see any reason to hope. The Stars are all against me: abandoned, betrayed, scorned. I have forever lost my peace, and solace. Ah, Cruel Destiny! My Son! My Spouse! My heart already torn to pieces by innumerable pains, pitiless people. All conspire against me. I wish I could hide, I wish I could flee. The lightening sky frightens me. I am becoming numb by this excruciating pain. I have no more tears. I have no more voice. I cannot even cry. I cannot even talk." 🎼
1736	Florence	Cesare in Egitto	Geminiano Giacomelli	Cornelia	F	new setting	re-arranged by Giuseppe Maria Orlandini and later by Antonio Vivaldi
1736	Florence	Ginevra principessa di Scozia	Antonio Vivaldi	Ginevra	F	premiere	
1737	Ferrara	Demetrio	Johann Adolph Hasse	Cleonice	F	revival	
1737	Ferrara	Alessandro nell'Indie	Antonio Vivaldi and Johann Adolph Hasse	Cleofide	F		pasticcio based on Johann Adolph Hasse's music or new setting by Hasse (?)
1737	Verona	Catone in Utica	Antonio Vivaldi	Marzia	F	premiere	
1738	Venice	L'oracolo in Messenia	Antonio Vivaldi	Merope	F	premiere	
1738	Venice	Armida al campo d'Egitto	Antonio Vivaldi	Armida	F	revised version	
1738	Venice	Rosmira	Antonio Vivaldi	Rosmira /Eurimene	F	premiere	pasticcio
1738	Ancona	Siroe re di Persia	Antonio Vivaldi	Emira	F	revival	
1739	Ferrara	Siroe re di Persia	Antonio Vivaldi	Emira	F	revival	
1739	Ferrara	Attalo re di Bitinia	Johann Adolph Hasse	Arsinoe	F	revival	
1739	Graz	Ciro riconosciuto	?	Mandane	F	?	
1739	Graz	Rosmira	Leonardo Vinci	Rosmira	F	revival	pasticcio
1739	Graz	Lucio Papirio dittatore	Francesco Zoppis ("other composers: AA. and VV.")	Papiria	F	premiere	pasticcio (?)
1740	Graz	Catone in Utica	Antonio Vivaldi	Marzia	F	revival	
1740	Graz	Amor, odio e pentimento	Giovanni Porta	Arnea	F	revival	
1742	Vienna	L'oracolo in Messenia	Antonio Vivaldi	Merope (?)	F	revival	Posthumous production (Vivaldi died in 1741)
1743	Venice	Ezio	Giovanni Battista Lampugnani	Fulvia	F	revival	
1745	Milan	Ricimero	Baldassare Galuppi	Ediuge	F	premiere	
1745	Milan	L'Ipolito	Christoph Willibald Gluck	Fedra	F	premiere	Frontispiece and cast from the libretto of the 1745 premiere of Christoph Willibald Gluck's L'Ipolito in Florence. Girò sings the prima donna role of Phaedra ("Fedra").
1746	Brescia	Alessandro nell'Indie	Pietro Pellegrini	Cleofide (as "Anna Maria Girò")	F	premiere	
1747	Venice	Achille in Sciro	Giovanni Battista Runcher	Achille	M dressed as F	premiere	Frontispiece and cast from the libretto of the 1747 premiere of Giovanni Battista Runcher's Achille in Sciro. Girò is listed under the role of "Achille, in abito femminile sotto nome di Pirra amante di Deidamia" (Achilles, dressed as a woman under the name Pirra, in love with Deidamia).
1748	Piacenza	Artaserse	Giuseppe Carcani	Mandane	F	premiere	

=== Vivaldi's and Girò's professional collaboration in figures ===
(Based on the information available to us – see above table)

1. From their first premiere together to their last:

- 12 years span
- 14 original productions (including premieres). i.e. 14 roles written by Vivaldi specifically for Girò.

2. From their first show together to their last:

- 15 years span
- 22 productions (including revivals and revised versions)

3. Their collaboration represents 15 years out of:

- 21 years (Girò). (length of her career whilst Vivaldi was alive)
- 18 years (Vivaldi) (length of his opera career whilst Girò was active professionally)

4. Their partnership lasted until the very death of the composer in 1741, or very close to it.

This sort of long and fruitful professional collaboration is unheard of concerning Vivaldi. And generally speaking, it was rather uncommon. For instance, Senesino, whom we consider as closely associated with George Frideric Handel for the many famous operas they collaborated on, spent 13 years working with Handel, out of 33 years (length of his career whilst Handel was alive). Together they created 16 roles and collaborated on 3 revivals. Finally, they stopped their partnership 7 years before the death of the composer.

== Private life ==
With the exception of Alderano Cybo-Malaspina, Duke of Massa and Carrara (who in 1725, through Vivaldi, gave her money for the purchase of a harpsichord), Girò seems to have always worked without depending on patrons. (Alderano dissipated the assets and heritage accumulated by the Cybo dynasty, including the Duchy of Massa and Carrara itself.)

In 1741, on his way to Vienna where he wished to take up the position of a composer in the imperial court, Vivaldi may have stopped in Graz to see Girò, and she likely went with him on his journey. Her schedule seems to support this theory as the records show that she was in Graz in 1740 and 1741 and then in Vienna in 1742. Vivaldi was hoping to make a fresh start in Vienna. However his asthma, exhaustion and the death of the music-loving Emperor Charles VI, one of his great admirers, put an end to the project before it had even begun, and the composer died on 28 July of the same year at the age of 63.

In 1748, while on tour in Piacenza, Girò met Count Antonio Maria Zanardi Landi, a local nobleman. He followed her back to Venice and persuaded her to marry him, despite the disparity of their conditions. They married in secret on 20 July 1748 in Venice. From 1748, there are no more records of her. She possibly retired from the stage and moved to Piacenza. There is no record of her death, so it is not known when and where she died.

== Private relationship with Vivaldi ==
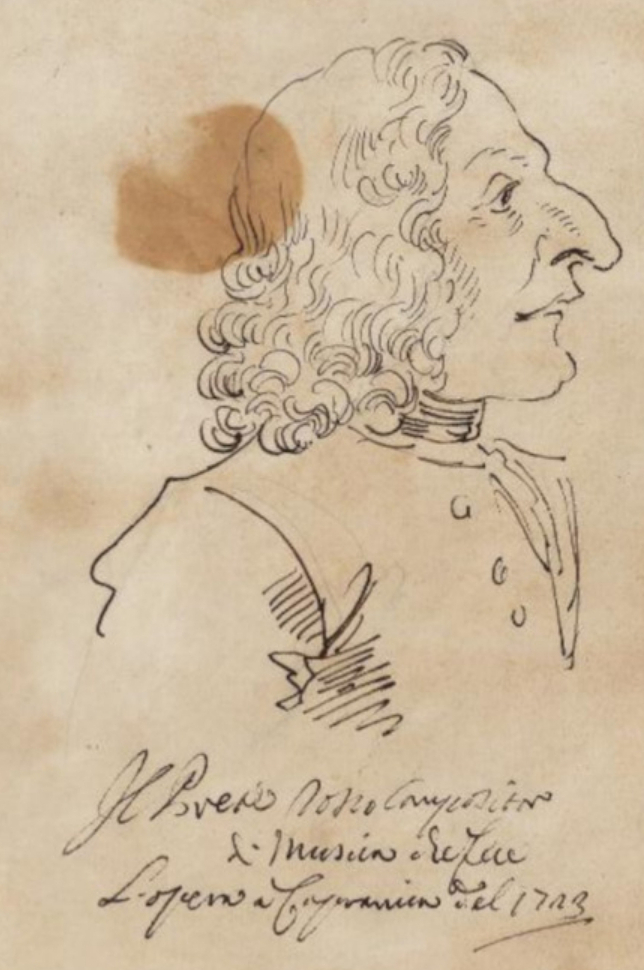
Caricature of Vivaldi by Pier Leone Ghezzi. "The Red Priest, composer of music who made the opera at the Capranica of 1723"

=== Speculations ===
Vivaldi's contemporaries and modern scholars have speculated on the nature of the composer's and Girò's relationship, but no evidence exists to indicate anything beyond friendship and professional collaboration. Vivaldi in fact adamantly denied any romantic relationship with Girò in a letter to his patron Bentivoglio dated 16 November 1737.

=== All'Ospedale della Pietà ===
In 2008, Susan Orlando – director of the Vivaldi Edition for Naïve/Opus 111 – writes in The Guardian: "From 1703 to 1735, Vivaldi ... played the role of music master and composer to the young girls living at La Pietà. Imagining Vivaldi ... in a role of both authority and intimacy among these vulnerable young women, has seduced writers and film-makers into fantasising about the erotic potential of the scenario. It is easy to imagine a libidinous red-haired priest exploiting the privileges of the cloth, in an institution that even 17th- and 18th-century visitors described with thinly veiled salaciousness. ... [But with regard to] illicit affairs, we have nothing to go on."

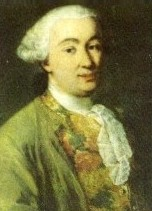
Carlo Goldoni

=== A priest's Perpetua ===
S. Orlando continues: "A better documented trail leads to Vivaldi's muse, Anna Giro. [sic.] In 1724, this promising young singer and her elder half-sister, acting as chaperone, moved in with Vivaldi. ... She was closely affiliated with him until the end of his life. Again, the titillating image of a 'loose' priest comes up. In truth, this arrangement may not have been so shocking in an age in which priests traditionally maintained a life-long, live-in perpetua – a woman who dedicated her time to the priest as cook, house cleaner and general companion. But Anna held a special place in Vivaldi's heart; in opera after opera he wrote roles specifically for her, moulding the music to her particular vocal strengths and weaknesses. No other singer received such consistent attention and privilege from the composer. In 1738 Vivaldi was refused entrance to the city of Ferrara where his opera Farnace was to be performed. The city's new cardinal was making a moral point – his disapproval of a priest involved in the frivolities of the operatic world and living under the same roof as a female singer. These are the scant facts we have to go on ... But Vivaldi consistently denied any wrongdoing."

=== Goldoni's account and the Virgin Mary ===
Letting us draw our own conclusions, S. Orlando tells us two anecdotes: "Carlo Goldoni [the famous Venetian playwright who collaborated with him on his opera Griselda] has left us a vivid description of his first meeting with Vivaldi in 1735. He arrived to find the composer engrossed in meditational reading and describes him clutching his missal throughout the interview – signs of, at the very least, a modicum of religious conviction. ... To this should be added that Vivaldi signed many of his music scores, especially but not exclusively the operas and sacred music, with an extravagant dedication to the Virgin Mary."

== In popular culture ==
=== Cinema ===
- In the 1989 Franco-Italian fictional comedy-thriller Venetian Red (Rouge Venise / Rosso Veneziano) directed by Etienne Périer, Girò ("La Girò") is played by actress Catherine Lachens.
- In the 2006 French fictional drama Antonio Vivaldi, Un Prince à Venise directed by Jean-Louis Guillermou, Girò is played by actress Annette Schreiber and her sister is played by actress Diana Fertikh.

=== Books (fiction) ===
- Romijn, André (2007) Hidden Harmonies The Secret Life of Antonio Vivaldi. Roman House Publishers Ltd.
- Bruce Kelly, Sarah (2009) The Red Priest's Annina: A Novel of Vivaldi and Anna Girò. Bel Canto Press.

== Discography ==
Many roles once sung or created by Girò have been interpreted and recorded by mezzo-sopranos, contraltos or countertenors. The musical links below (🎼) will take you to audio recordings of some of Girò's arias that survived the centuries.

- Vinci. Catone in Utica Emilia: Vince Yi. Riccardo Minasi, Il pomo d'oro. Decca 01588194. 2015. 🎼
- Vivaldi. Armida all Campo d'Egitto Armida: Sara Mingardo. Rinaldo Alessandrini, Concerto Italiano. Naïve/Opus111 OP30492. 2010 🎼
- Vivaldi. Atenaide Pulcheria: Guillemette Laurens. Federico Maria Sardelli, Modo Antiquo. Naïve/Opus111 Vivaldi Edition OP30438. 2007 🎼
- Vivaldi. Bajazet Asteria: Marijana Mijanović. Fabio Biondi, Europa Galante. Virgin VCDW 545676-2. 2005 🎼
- Vivaldi. Catone in Utica Marzia: Liliana Faraon. Jean-Claude Malgoire. La Grande Ecurie et la Chambre du Roy. Dynamic 403/1-2. 2002 🎼
- Vivaldi. Catone in Utica Marzia: Sonia Prina. Alan Curtis, Il Complesso Barocco. Naïve OP30545. 2013 🎼
- Vivaldi. Dorilla in Tempe. Eudamia: Consuelo Caroli. Gilbert Bezzina, Ensemble Baroque de Nice. Pierre Verany PV794092. 1994 🎼
- Vivaldi. Dorilla in Tempe. Eudamia: Sonia Prina. Diego Fasolis, I Barocchisti. Opus111/Naïve. OP30560. 2017 🎼
- Vivaldi. Farnace Tamiri: Ruxandra Donose. Diego Fasolis, I Barocchisti. Virgin Classics 2011 🎼
- Vivaldi. Farnace Tamiri: Sara Mingardo. Jordi Savall, Le Concert Des Nations. Opus111/Naïve. OP30471. 2009

🎼

- Vivaldi. Griselda Griselda: Marie-Nicole Lemieux. Jean-Christophe Spinosi, Ensemble Mattheus. Opus111/Naïve OP30419. 2006 🎼
- Vivaldi. Griselda Griselda: Caitlin Hulcup. Erin Helyard, Orchestra of the Antipodes. Pinchgut Live PG002. 2011 🎼
- Vivaldi. Griselda Griselda: Marion Newman. Kevin Mallon, Aradia Ensemble. Naxos 8.660211-13. 2008 🎼
- Vivaldi. Motezuma Mitrena: Marijana Mijanović. Alan Curtis, Il Complesso Barocco. DG-Archiv 477 599–6. 2006 🎼
- Vivaldi. Orlando furioso. Alcina: Jennifer Larmore. Jean-Christophe Spinosi, Ensemble Mattheus. Opus111/Naïve OP30393. 2004 🎼
- Vivaldi. Orlando furioso. Alcina: Marina de Liso. Federico Maria Sardelli, Modo Antiquo. cpo 777095-2. 2008 🎼
- Vivaldi. Rosmira Rosmira: Marianna Pizzolato. Gilbert Bezzina, Ensemble Baroque de Nice. Dynamic CDS437/1-3. 2003 🎼
- La Ninfa Infelice e Fortunata. This pasticcio is likely to have reused a number of arias from Vivaldi's La Verità in Cimento. It marked the operatic debut of Girò. Frédéric Delaméa writes in the liner notes to the Naïve/Opus 111 recording of La Verità in Cimento (OP 30365. 2003) that it "bears the stamp" of Vivaldi.
