= Antonia Maria Laurenti =

Italian singer

Antonia Maria Laurenti, “detta la Corelli” (fl. 1715–1741), was one of the most renowned Italian contralto singers of the early 18th century, the interpreter of starring operatic roles in a large number of musical centers, both in Italy and central Europe, and a collaborator of Antonio Vivaldi. She was the object of satire in Benedetto Marcello’s famous pamphlet Il teatro alla moda of 1720, a critique of Italian operatic culture of the day. Alongside two other prominent Bolognese singers of this era, Maria Caterina Negri and Margherita Gualandi, she was a member of the musical circle of Antonio Vivaldi in Venice. All three sang in Prague between the years 1724 and 1729, probably due to arrangements cultivated between Vivaldi and the impresario of the Sporck theater, Antonio Denzio. As was the case with Gualandi, Laurenti found a husband among the Italian singing personnel active in Prague in the 1720s.

== Personal background and early career in Italy (to 1719) ==
Although no documentation of Laurenti's biography is recorded before the appearance of her name in the libretto for Francesco Gasparini's opera Antioco, performed during the carnival season of 1715 in Padua, it has long been believed that she was a member of the Laurenti family of musicians in Bologna. Specifically, she is suspected to have been the daughter of the great progenitor of the family, Bartolomeo Girolamo Laurenti (1644 or 1645 – 1726), a distinguished composer and violinist who participated in a great era of music making in Bologna in the late 17th and early 18th centuries marked by the presence of Giuseppe Torelli and Arcangelo Corelli in the city at various times. A problem regarding the supposed parentage of Bartolomeo Girolamo Laurenti is that he would have had to have been at least about 50 years old at the time of her birth if she were truly his daughter. The first recorded operatic role for a singer as distinguished as Laurenti followed by a career as long as Laurenti's would indicate an age no older than her early 20s when she first appeared on stage. Nonetheless, the relationship is quite possible when comparing a possible birth date in the 1690s with the birth dates of other children of Bartolomeo. The birth dates of four of his sons, all professional musicians, are known: Pietro Paolo (born 1675), Girolamo Nicolò (born 1678), Angelo Maria (born 1688), and Lodovico Filippo (born 1693). Considering the intense cultivation of instrumental music practiced by the members of the family of Bartolomeo Girolamo Laurenti, there would be some question about how Maria Antonia would have received her training as a vocalist. It can only be said that in the period of her childhood such training would have been readily available in Bologna.

Much interesting information about Laurenti can be gleaned from the librettos printed for her earliest operatic roles. They began in two operas performed in Padua during the carnival season of 1715, in which she was identified simply as “Antonia Maria Laurenti, bolognese”. An appearance in a carnival season (the very earliest period of each calendar year) meant that she would have been contracted sometime late in 1714. In the carnival season of 1716, in her native Bologna, she appeared in librettos as “Antonia Maria Laurenti detta la Coralli, bolognese.” The introduction of a new surname for a female singer using this style was typically the indication of a marriage. If this is the case, there is no information available at present about who this male Coralli might have been. The phrase “detta la Coralli” is found routinely in the librettos attached to Laurenti's roles from this time until her appearances in Florence in the carnival season of 1730. There is only one surviving libretto that presents her original married name in a succinct, straightforward way as “Antonia Maria Coralli”: one printed for a production of the opera Teofane by Antonio Lotti that was performed at the Opernhaus am Zwinger in Dresden on 13 September 1719. Beginning in the spring of 1727, just after a fresh marriage to the Italian singer Felice Novelli (or Novello) in Prague, there was a period in which her two post-natal surnames were combined, the first time in the libretto for the anonymous Achille in Sciro performed in Prague in April 1727, in which she is identified as “Antonia Maria Laurenti detta Coralli, ora [now] Novello”. One would think that Laurenti's husband Coralli must have passed away sometime before 1727.

The first operatic production in which Laurenti is known to have participated was an Antioco in Padua composed by Francesco Gasparini (1661–1727), one of the most prominent composers in Venice at the time. In time, she appeared in more operas by Gasparini than by any other composer (six between 1715 and 1722, in Padua, Florence, Milan, and Turin. It is an open question whether Gasparini may have facilitated connections with Vivaldi, who was a professional associate of his in Venice. In both of her first operatic performances (in Padua during the carnival season of 1715), Laurenti appeared in male roles (breeches roles), as she did commonly throughout her career. Her contralto tessitura may have contributed to this, but there was nothing uncommon about the practice at all in early 18th century Italy and central Europe.

Laurenti found herself quite busy with appearances in the first four years of her career, but it was an apprentice period in which she mainly found work only in lesser operatic centers. The highlight could probably be pinpointed as her first appearance in an opera of Vivaldi: Armida al campo d'Egitto in Mantua in the spring of 1718, in which she appeared in the male role of Adrasto. Unlike certain other singers who appeared in Mantua when Vivaldi was resident there between 1717 and 1720 as maestro di capella for the governor, Philip of Hesse-Darmstadt, Laurenti was not engaged as a “virtuosa” in Philip's musical establishment in consideration for her work in this subsidiary role.

== Later career (1719–1732) ==
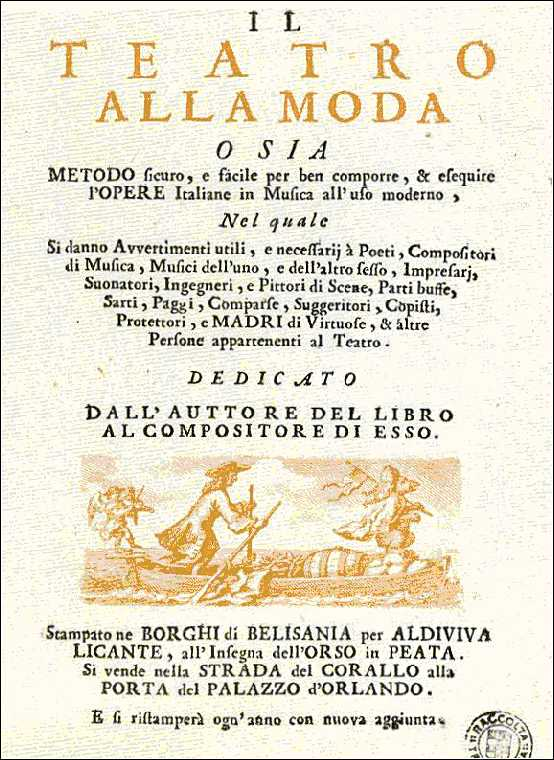
Title page of Il teatro alla moda

It was only a short time after her engagement in Mantua, however, that Laurenti did achieve the common goal of the leading singers of her era to find employment in the household of a sovereign ruler. The opportunity arose in 1719 through the efforts of the composer Francesco Maria Veracini to seek talented personnel to perform in the musical establishment of Augustus II the Strong, Elector of Saxony and King of Poland (Veracini served as a musician at the court of Augustus in Dresden between 1717 and 1722). In 1719, Veracini was sent to Italy by the Saxon court to engage talented singers for Augustus, and in Bologna, he arranged for Laurenti's departure just after her appearance in two operas during the carnival season in Brescia. In September 1719, Laurenti appeared in two productions at the Opernhaus am Zwinger in Dresden sponsored by the court of Saxony: Giove in Argo and Teofane, each with music by the court composer Antonio Lotti. The performances were mounted as a part of celebrations in honor of the marriage of Crown Prince Friedrich August of Poland (later King Augustus III of Poland) and the Archduchess Maria Josepha of Austria. As soon as Laurenti appeared in operas again in Italy, she advertised herself as a chamber musician (virtuosa di camera) at the court of King Augustus, the first instance for a production of Antonio Vivaldi's opera La verità in cimento at the Teatro Sant’Angelo in Venice during the autumn operatic season of 1720. Laurenti used her title “virtuosa di camera di s.m. [His Majesty] il re di Polonia ed elettore di Sassonia” until the death of Augustus the Strong in 1733, the last time for a production of Gl’evenimenti di Rugero by Tomaso Albinoni performed at the Teatro San Moisè in Venice during the carnival operatic season of 1732.

A rather stunning confirmation of Laurenti's newly achieved prominence during the run of Vivaldi's La verità in cimento is the way that the Venetian composer and music critic Benedetto Marcello drew attention to her on the title page of his satirical pamphlet Il teatro alla moda of 1720, a critique of operatic culture in Venice of his day that was prompted by the author's attendance at productions in October 1720 of Antonio Vivaldi's opera La verità in cimento at the Teatro Sant’Angelo and the opera Il Filindo by Giuseppe Maria Buini at the Teatro San Moisè. One of the chief aspects of Marcello's satire is parody of the vanity and vulgarity of female singers, and he made a point in particular to emphasize the affectations of Bolognese singers. The title page of Marcello's Il teatro alla moda features veiled references to four Bolognese singers set off in capital letters: Caterina Borghi, Cecilia Belisani, and Caterina Cantelli (all of whom appeared in Buini's opera Il Filindo), plus Laurenti. As a part of specifying the publication information on behalf of the supposed publisher Aldaviva Licante (a name formed from anagrams of the surnames of Antonio Vivaldi and Caterina Cantelli), the place where the pamphlet could be purchased is identified as a location in "Coral Street" ("la Strada del Corallo"), a formation fashioned from the surname of Anna Maria Strada, a native of Bergamo who appeared in Vivaldi's La verità in cimento, and Lauenti's married name “Coralli.” Marcello's satire includes biting condemnation of the objectionable attitudes and personality traits of female singers of his day, but none of them can be attributed individually to any of the singers he saw perform in Venice in October 1720, rather only to a generic “Virtuosa” whose animated mother speaks in Bolognese dialect.

After her season of appearances at the Teatro Sant’Angelo in Venice in 1720–21, Laurenti continued to appear in roles in the major operatic centers of Milan and Turin between 1721 and 1723, then the lesser centers of Bologna, Livorno, and Genoa between 1723 and 1726. In the summer of 1726, she was contracted to appear at the Sporck theater in Prague and remained in the Denzio company for appearances throughout the operatic season of 1726–27. She appeared almost entirely in pasticci. An important event in Laurenti's personal life occurred in Prague on 8 March 1727, when she was married to the Venetian singer Felice Novelli (Novello), another member of Denzio's company only for the operatic season of 1726–27. The ceremony was officiated by a distinguished local musical figure, the composer and organist Bohuslav Matěj Černohorský, who happened to be a priest. Laurenti and Novelli were probably not strangers at the time they arrived in Prague in 1726, since Novelli appeared in the title role of the opera Il Filindo by Giuseppe Maria Buini at the Teatro San Moisè in October 1720 at the same time that Laurenti was appearing in Vivaldi's La verità in cimento at the Teatro Sant’Angelo, the productions that were the inspiration for Marcello's Il teatro alla moda. Even if they had not actually met in Venice in 1720, Novelli certainly would have been known to Laurenti by reputation.

After their appearances in Prague, Laurenti took a break from operatic appearances for some reason. No roles are recorded for her at all in the year 1728, rather she next appeared in Bologna in the summer of 1729 in an anonymous Endimione. It would be reasonable to assume that she traveled in the interim with her husband, who is recorded in roles in Livorno and Bologna in 1728 and in Rome during the carnival season of 1729, although she may have stayed in her native Bologna the entire time. Beginning in the autumn operatic season of 1730, Laurenti and Novelli appeared together in five consecutive productions up to 1732, first in Turin in an anonymous Artaserse, then in San Giovanni in Persiceto, and finally in Venice during the carnival season of 1732 in a revival of Tomaso Albinoni's opera Alcina delusa da Rugero performed under the title Gl’evenimenti di Rugero at the Teatro San Moisè. This marked the effective end of Laurenti's career.

== Last documentation (to 1741) ==
No activities of any kind are recorded for Laurenti between her appearance in Albinoni's opera in 1732 and the beginning of a short revival of her career in provincial Italian centers that was initiated by a role in the pasticcio L’incoronazione giustificata in Faenza during the carnival operatic season of 1739. It would be reasonable to assume that she traveled with her husband, but there is no documentation to support the hypothesis. Like his wife, Novelli is not traceable for surprisingly long periods of time in the 1730s – no roles at all are recorded during the years 1733 and 1734 and just one in each during the years 1732, 1735, 1736, and 1737. His career started to revive in 1738, and he then appeared in Faenza in 1739 with his wife in the pasticcio L’innocenza giustificata. In the spring of 1740, the Novellis sang together in Giuseppe Sordella's Scipione nelle Spagne in Asti. Laurenti's last role was in the pasticcio Sirbace in Ferrara during the carnival season of 1741, and it was also her last appearance on stage with Felice Novelli. After this time, her husband's career exploded with activity, perhaps a hint that his wife's passing might have left him more available for concentrating strictly on his own career. It last lasted much longer – his final recorded role was sung in Bologna during the carnival season of 1759 in the intermezzo Gli quattro amanti in un amante solo by Baldassarre Galuppi. Regardless, neither the date nor place of Laurenti's death has been established.

== Operatic roles ==
- Tolomeo in Antioco by Francesco Gasparini (Padua, 1715)
- Ilo in Ercole sul Termodonte by Giacomo Rampini (Padua, 1715)
- Aminta in Il trionfo di Pallade in Arcadia by Floriano Arresti (Bologna, 1715)
- Elvira in the anonymous La fede ne’ tradimenti (Bologna, 1716)
- Astolfo in L’Alarico by Tomaso Albinoni (Bologna, 1716)
- Ubaldo in Armida abbandonata by Giuseppe Maria Buini (Bologna, 1716)
- Filli in L’enigma disciolto by Carlo Francesco Pollarolo (Modena, 1716)
- Lucilla in Lucio Vero by Carlo Francesco Pollarolo (Modena, 1717)
- Andronico in Tamerlamo by Francesco Gasparini (Florence, 1717)
- Aminta in Il principe corsaro by Giovanni Carlo Maria Clari (Florence, 1717)
- Isabella in the anonymous Il potestà di Colognole (Florence, 1717)
- Sallustia in the pasticcio Alessandro Severo (Florence, 1718)
- Arbace in Il Ciro by Francesco Gasparini (Florence, 1718)
- Adrasto in Armida al campo d'Egitto by Antonio Vivaldi (Mantua, 1718)
- Sallustia in the anonymous Alessandro Severo (Bologna, 1718)
- Giulia Mammea in Alessandro Severo by Fortunato Chelleri (Brescia, 1719)
- Alvilda in the anonymous L’amor generoso (Brescia, 1719)
- Calisto in Giove in Argo by Antonio Lotti (Dresden, 1719)
- Felicità, Naiade, and Germania in Teofane by Antonio Lotti (Dresden, 1719)
- Melindo in La verità in cimento by Antonio Vivaldi (Venice, 1720)
- Demetrio in Filippo, re di Macedonia by Giuseppe Boniventi (Venice, 1721)
- Evalco in Antigone by Giuseppe Maria Orlandini (Venice, 1721)
- Ergasto in Il pastor fido by Carlo Luigi Pietragrua (Venice, 1721)
- Ermione in Astianatte by Francesco Gasparini (Milan, 1722)
- Teodelinda in Flavio Anicio Olibrio by Francesco Gasparini (Milan, 1722)
- Zornira in Semiramide by Giuseppe Maria Orlandini (Turin, 1722)
- Teodelinda in Il Ricimero by Francesco Gasparini (Turin, 1722)
- Valeria in La caduta de’ decemviri by Alessandro Scarlatti (Bologna, 1723)
- Laodicea in the anonymous Eumene (Livorno, 1725)
- Costanza in Isacio tiranno by Antonio Lotti (Livorno, 1725)
- Rosmira in Partenope by Paolo Vincenzo Chiocchetti (Genoa, 1726)
- Matilde in the anonymous Adelaide (Genoa, 1726)
- Arsinoe in the anonymous Il contrasto di due, gaudio è del terzo (Prague, 1726)
- Emilia in Arrenione by Giuseppe Maria Ruggieri (Prague, 1726)
- Marzia in the anonymous Tullo Ostilio(Prague, 1727)
- Cesonia in the anonymous Il confrono dell’amor coniugale (Prague, 1727)
- Deidamia in the anonymous Achille in Sciro (Prague, 1727)
- Zenobia in L’amor tirannico by Francesco Feo (Prague, 1727)
- Diana in the anonymous Endimione (Bologna, 1729)
- Ermione in Astianatte by Luca Antonio Predieri (Alessandria, 1729)
- Argia in the anonymous Merope (Florence, 1730)
- Rossane in Il gran Tamerlano by Giovanni Porta (Florence, 1730)
- Semira in the anonymous Artaserse (Turin, 1730)
- Dorisbe in La serva favorita by Giovanni Chinzer (Turin, 1730)
- Rosmene in Imeneo in Atene by Nicola Porpora (San Giovanni in Persiceto, 1731)
- Rodelinda in La Rodelinda by Bartolomeo Cordans (Venice, 1731)
- Alcina in Gl’evenimenti di Rugero by Tomaso Albinoni (Venice, 1732)
- Statira in the pasticcio L’innocenza giustificata (Faenza, 1739)
- Marzio in Scipione nelle Spagne by Giuseppe Sordella (Asti, 1740)
- Nirena in the pasticcio Sirbace (Ferrara, 1741)

== Bibliography ==
- Freeman, Daniel E. The Opera Theater of Count Franz Anton von Sporck in Prague. Stuyvesant, N.Y., Pendragon Press, 1992. ISBN 0-945193-17-3
- Vitale, Carlo. “Laurenti – Famiglia di musicisti bolognesi”, in Dizionario biografico degli italiani [DBI], vol. 64, Rome 2005, pp. 70–74.
