= Domenico Dall'Oglio =

Italian composer

Domenico dall'Oglio (c. 1700 – 1764) was an Italian violinist and composer.

== Biography ==
Domenico dall'Oglio was born in Padua, Republic of Venice. He was probably a pupil of Giuseppe Tartini, either after 1721, when Tartini was appointed Maestro di Cappella at the Basilica di Sant'Antonio in Padua, or perhaps after 1726, when Tartini founded his violin school.

In 1732, dall'Oglio was appointed violinist at the Basilica di Sant'Antonio, but in 1735, he left Padua to go to the Russian Empire with his brother Giuseppe, a cellist. Both brothers remained in St Petersburg for nearly 29 years in the service of the imperial court. Court records make frequent reference to Domenico's activities as a virtuoso violinist and composer, and as a participant in the intrigues of the court. For relaxation, he liked to build musical instruments such as violins and lutes. He died in Narva, then part of the Russian Empire (today in Estonia), on his return journey to Italy.

== Musical style ==
Most of dall'Oglio's works are instrumental compositions, but at the imperial court of St Petersburg, in the absence of the maestro di cappella Francesco Araja, dall'Oglio was several times called on to produce music for the theatre. He was a master of the Italian virtuoso style of the eighteenth century, with frequent use of double-stopping and passages at high positions. Structurally his violin sonatas follow the shape Allegro-Adagio-Allegro, instead of the then customary structure Allegro-Grave/Largo-Allegro; noteworthy are the slow movements of his compositions, which have elaborate embellishments typical of the school of Tartini.

== Compositions ==
- 12 sonatas for violin and cello or harpsichord (1738 Amsterdam)
- 6 sinfonias for two violins, viola and bass, Op.1 (1753, Paris)
- 2 sonatas for flute and bass
- 12 sonatas for violin and basso continuo
- 4 sonatas for two violins, viola and bass
- Sinfonia Russa for strings
- "Sinfonia Cossaca" for two corni, strings and timpani
- Pieces for violetta and bass
- 17 violin concertos (with two violins, viola and cello obbligati)
- 10 sonatas for violin and bass
- La Russia afflitta (The afflicted Russia), prologue and pieces for Tito Vespasiano (La clemenza di Tito) by Johann Adolf Hasse (lost)
- E soffrirò che si – Combattuto da più venti (And who will suffer - Battered by several winds), recitative and aria for soprano and strings, for Didone abbandonata by Francesco Zoppis
- Various ballets and music for the theatre
