= Griselda (Vivaldi) =

Opera by Antonio Vivaldi

- Dramma per musica by Antonio Vivaldi
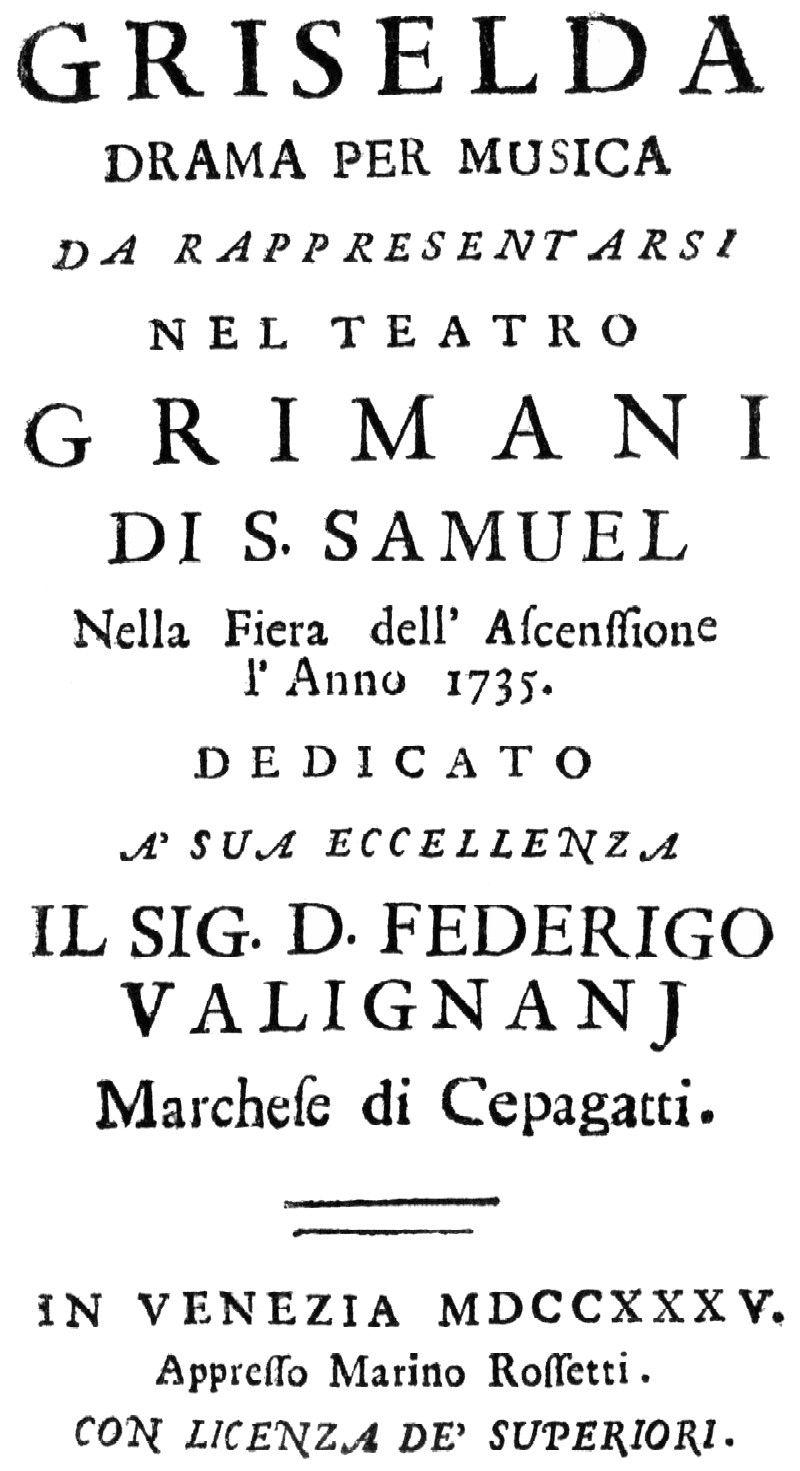
- Cover of the libretto for the premiere
- Librettist: Apostolo Zeno, Carlo Goldoni
- Premiere: 18 May 1735; Teatro San Samuele, Venice

Griselda (Italian pronunciation: [ɡriˈzɛlda]) is a dramma per musica in three acts that was composed by Antonio Vivaldi. The opera uses a revised version of the 1701 Italian libretto by Apostolo Zeno that was based on Giovanni Boccaccio's The Decameron (X, 10, "The Patient Griselda"). The celebrated Venetian playwright Carlo Goldoni was hired to adapt the libretto for Vivaldi. The opera was first performed in Venice at the Teatro San Samuele on 18 May 1735.

== Composition history ==
Michael Talbot notes that "the particular fame of this opera arises from the fact that it involved a collaboration with Goldoni," although one which was initially fraught with problems, but he goes on to note that the two men eventually worked out an amicable compromise in the revision of an old libretto to fit the vocal limitations of the first Griselda, Anna Girò.

== Performance history ==
The opera's first modern performance was in concert on 11 May 1978 in the English Bach Festival with John Eliot Gardiner as conductor. The opera was given its UK theatrical premiere on 23 July 1983 as part of the Buxton Festival, while in the US, it was not presented until 2000.

Today, Griselda is rarely performed, but it featured as one of the 2011 festival season presentations of The Santa Fe Opera. Pinchgut Opera (Sydney) staged four performances November–December 2011 in the City Recital Hall and in Rio de Janeiro Municipal Theatre in June 2012 in concert form with Francesconi, Franco, Nardotto, Bitar, Christensson and Faria conducted by Marco Pace. Two arias from the opera have become popular concert pieces with singers such as Cecilia Bartoli and Simone Kermes. These are "Agitata da due venti" from act 2 and "Dopo un'orrida procella" from act 3.

On the 12 October 2019, Irish National Opera staged a production of the work in Galway's Town Hall Theatre. This was the first ever performance of any Vivaldi opera in Ireland.

== Roles ==
Role	Voice type	Premiere Cast, 18 May 1735
Gualtiero, King of Thessaly	tenor	Gregorio Babbi
Griselda, wife of Gualtiero	contralto	Anna Girò
Costanza, their daughter, unknown to Griselda, in love with Roberto	soprano	Margherita Giacomazzi
Roberto, an Athenian Prince, in love with Costanza	soprano castrato	Gaetano Valletta
Ottone, a Thessalian nobleman	soprano castrato	Lorenzo Saletti
Corrado, Roberto's brother, friend of Gualtiero	soprano (en travesti)	Elisabetta Gasparini
Everardo, son of Gualterio and Griselda	silent	Unknown

== Synopsis ==
=== Act 1 ===
Years before the action begins, Gualtiero, King of Thessaly, had married a poor shepherdess, Griselda. The marriage was deeply unpopular with the king's subjects and when a daughter, Costanza, was born, the king had to pretend to have her killed while secretly sending her to be brought up by Prince Corrado of Athens. Now, after the recent birth of a son has led to another rebellion from the Thessalians against Griselda as a queen, Gualtiero is forced to dismiss her and promises to take a new wife. The proposed bride is in fact Costanza, who is unaware of her true parentage and unknown to Griselda. She is in love with Corrado's younger brother, Roberto, and the thought of being forced to marry Gualtiero drives her to despair.

=== Act 2 ===
Costanza sings of her torn affections (betrothed to Gualtiero but in love with Roberto) in the coloratura aria Agitata da due venti. Griselda returns to her home in the countryside where she is pursued by the villainous courtier Ottone, who is completely besotted with her and has surreptitiously fomented the popular uprisings in order to derail her marriage. She angrily rejects his advances. Gualtiero and his followers go out hunting and come across Griselda's cottage. Gualtiero foils an attempt by Ottone to kidnap Griselda and allows her back to the court, but only as Costanza's slave.

=== Act 3 ===
Ottone still resolutely pursues Griselda and Gualtiero promises him her hand as soon as he himself has married Costanza. Griselda absolutely refuses and declares she would rather die. At this point, Gualtiero embraces her, having demonstrated her virtue to the rebellious people, and takes her back as his wife. Gualtiero and Corrado reveal the true identity of Costanza, Ottone is pardoned and the girl is allowed to marry Roberto.

== Recordings ==
Year	Cast (Griselda, Gualtiero, Roberto, Costanza, Ottone, Corrado)	Conductor, Opera House and Orchestra	Label
2006	Marie-Nicole Lemieux; Steffano Ferrari; Philippe Jaroussky; Verónica Cangemi; Simone Kermes; Iestyn Davies	Jean-Christophe Spinosi; Ensemble Matheus	Audio CD: naïve
2008	Marion Newman; Giles Tomkins; Lynne McMurtry; Carla Huhtanen; Colin Ainsworth; Nedecky	Kevin Mallon; Aradia Ensemble	Audio CD: Naxos; Cat: 8.660211-13
2011	Caitlin Hulcup; Christopher Saunders; Tobias Cole; Miriam Allan; David Hansen; Russell Harcourt	Erin Helyard; Pinchgut Opera	Audio CD: Pinchgut Opera
