= Girolamo Giusti =

Italian opera librettist

Girolamo Giusti (1703 – ?) was an Italian librettist and composer.

He is often confused with his uncle, Alvise Giusti (1709–1766) an Italian lawyer, poet, and librettist, who also wrote libretti. Between them, they produced at least four, although it has been unclear which Giusti wrote which libretto, and sometimes they have wrongly been assumed to be the same person.

In the past, the libretto for Vivaldi's 1733 opera Motezuma had been attributed to Girolamo on the basis of a later archivist handwriting the name on a printed copy. However, according to Michael Talbot writing in The Vivaldi Compendium, "the scholarly consensus is that Alvise Giusti not Girolamo Giusti is at least the author of the libretto for Vivaldi's Motezuma."
