= Francesco Maria Veracini =

Italian composer and violinist (1690-1768)

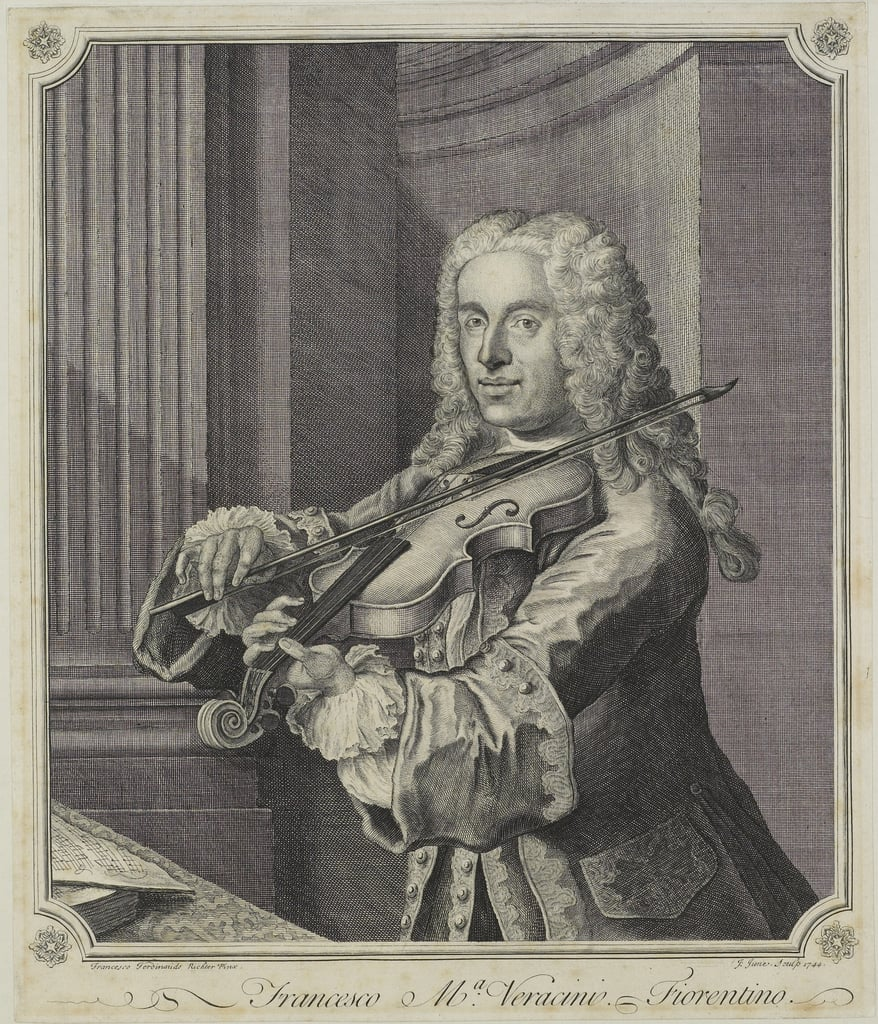
Francesco Maria Veracini

Francesco Maria Veracini (1 February 1690 – 31 October 1768) was an Italian composer and violinist, perhaps best known for his sets of violin sonatas. As a composer, according to Manfred Bukofzer, "His individual, if not subjective, style has no precedent in baroque music and clearly heralds the end of the entire era", while Luigi Torchi maintained that "he rescued the imperiled music of the eighteenth century", His contemporary, Charles Burney, held that "he had certainly a great share of whim and caprice, but he built his freaks on a good foundation, being an excellent contrapuntist". The asteroid 10875 Veracini was named after him.

== Life ==
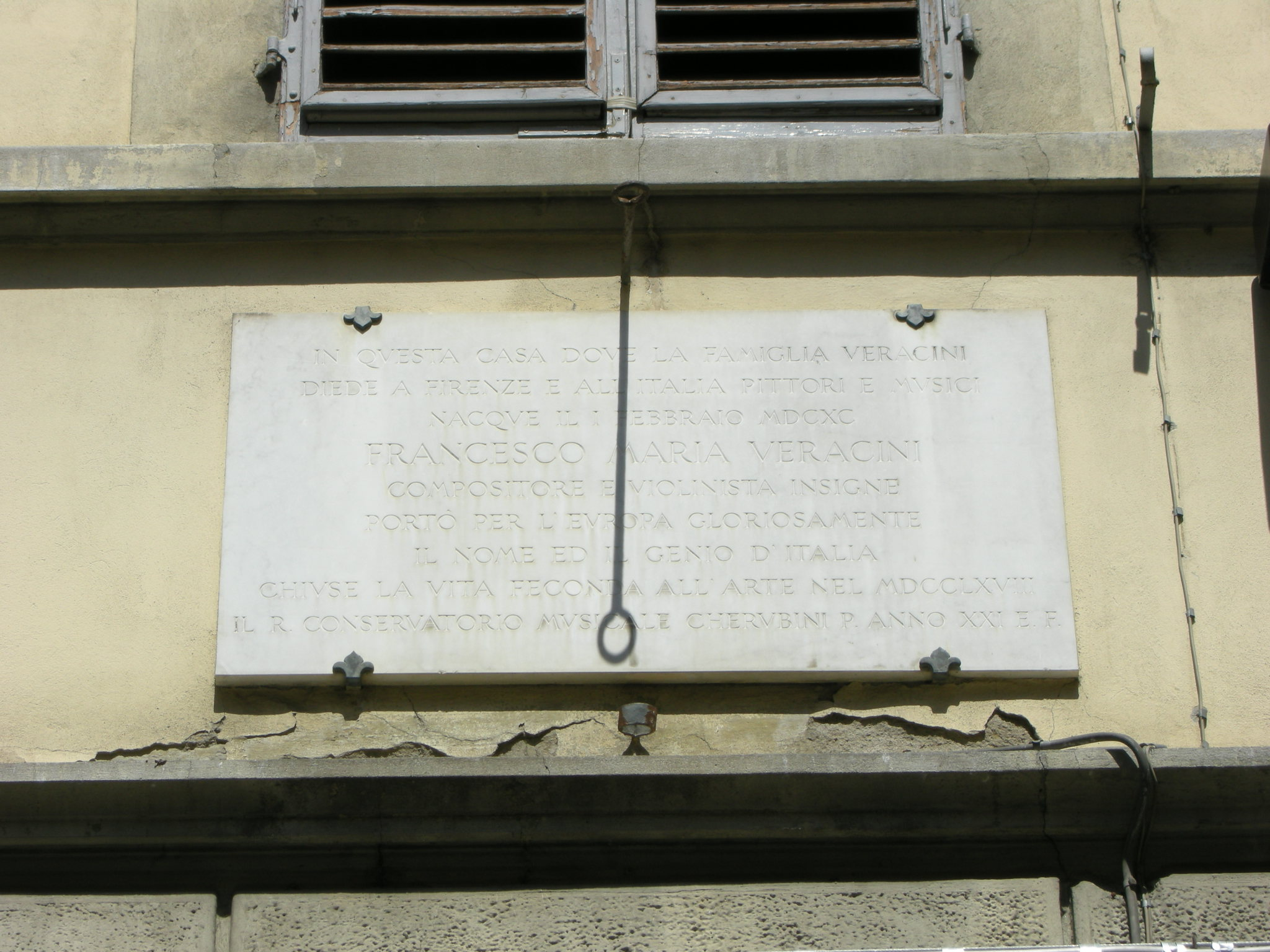
Plaque commemorating Veracini on via Palazzuolo 30, Florence

Francesco Maria Veracini was born on 1 February 1690 in the family house on the via Palazzuolo, parish of San Salvatore, Ognissanti, Florence. The second and only surviving son of Agostino Veracini, a pharmacist and undertaker (and ironically one of the few Veracinis who was not a violinist, even as an amateur), he was taught the violin by his uncle, Antonio Veracini, with whom he later often appeared in concert, as well as by Giovanni Maria Casini and his assistant Francesco Feroci. His grandfather, Francesco (di Niccolò) Veracini, had been one of the first violinists of Florence, and ran a music school in the house until ill health forced him to turn the business over to his eldest son, Antonio, in 1708. In addition, the family managed a painting studio and possessed a large collection of art works, including four Ghirlandaios, a Rubens, a Caracci and a dozen other paintings by the three members of the family from two generations, including Francesco's third son, Benedetto. The painter Niccolò Agostino Veracini was Francesco Maria's cousin. Veracini esteemed Carlo Ambrogio Lonati as a great violinist.

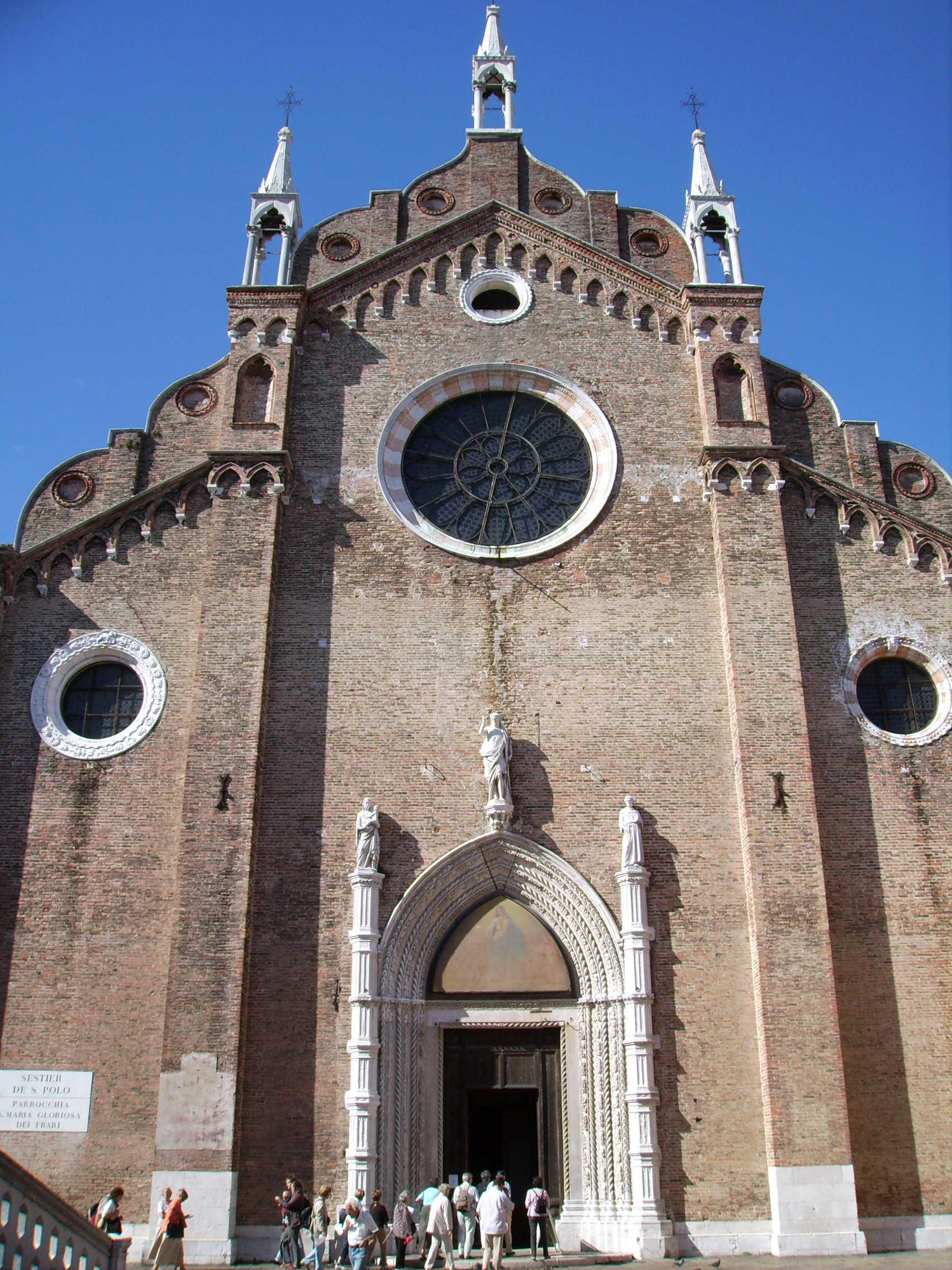
Santa Maria Gloriosa dei Frari one of the main churches in Venice

He is known to have been a soloist in Venice at the Christmas masses at San Marco, on 24 and 25 December 1711. On 1 February 1712 he performed a violin concerto of his own composition (the first recorded public performance by Veracini playing one of his own compositions), accompanied by trumpets, oboes, and strings as part of the celebrations in honour of the Austrian ambassador to Venice of the newly elected Holy Roman Emperor, Charles VI. The celebration, held in Santa Maria Gloriosa dei Frari included a vocal Te Deum and Mass, as well as motets and concertos performed under the direction of padre Ferdinando Antonio Lazari. The manuscript scores of all the works performed that day, including Veracini's concerto, were bound together in a handsome presentation volume now found in the National Library of Austria. An earlier, now superseded hypothesis, that this concerto was performed in Frankfurt at Charles VI's coronation on 22 December 1711, was offered before the discovery of documentation of Veracini's appearance as a soloist on Christmas Eve of that year, in Venice, two days later and some 800 kilometers to the south, and before the discovery of the payment record for Veracini's performance of this concerto in Venice on 1 February 1712.

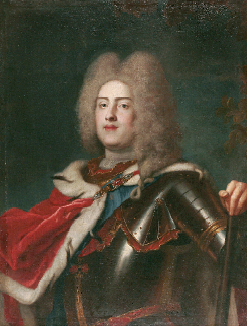
Young Friedrich August in 1716

In 1714, Veracini went to London and played instrumental pieces ("symphonies" in contemporary parlance) between the acts of operas at the Queen's Theatre. At the court of Johann Wilhelm, Elector Palatine and Anna Maria Luisa de' Medici he performed his oratorio Mosè al Mar Rosso. There is a legend that, when Giuseppe Tartini heard Veracini playing the violin, he was so impressed by his bowing technique, and so dissatisfied with his own skill, that he retreated the next day to Ancona "in order to study the use of the bow in more tranquility, and with more convenience than at Venice, as he had a place assigned him in the opera orchestra of that city".

Veracini wrote a set of violin/recorder sonatas dedicated to Prince Friedrich August, who came to celebrate carnival. The Prince recruited not only singers, as he was told to do by his father, but also musicians for the court in Dresden. He hired an entire opera company under the direction of the Italian composer Antonio Lotti, the librettist Antonio Maria Lucchini, the castrati Senesino and Matteo Berselli, the brothers Mauro architects, two painters, and two carpenters (Charlton 2000). In 1717 the Prince also secured the services of the eccentric Francesco Maria Veracini.

=== Dresden ===
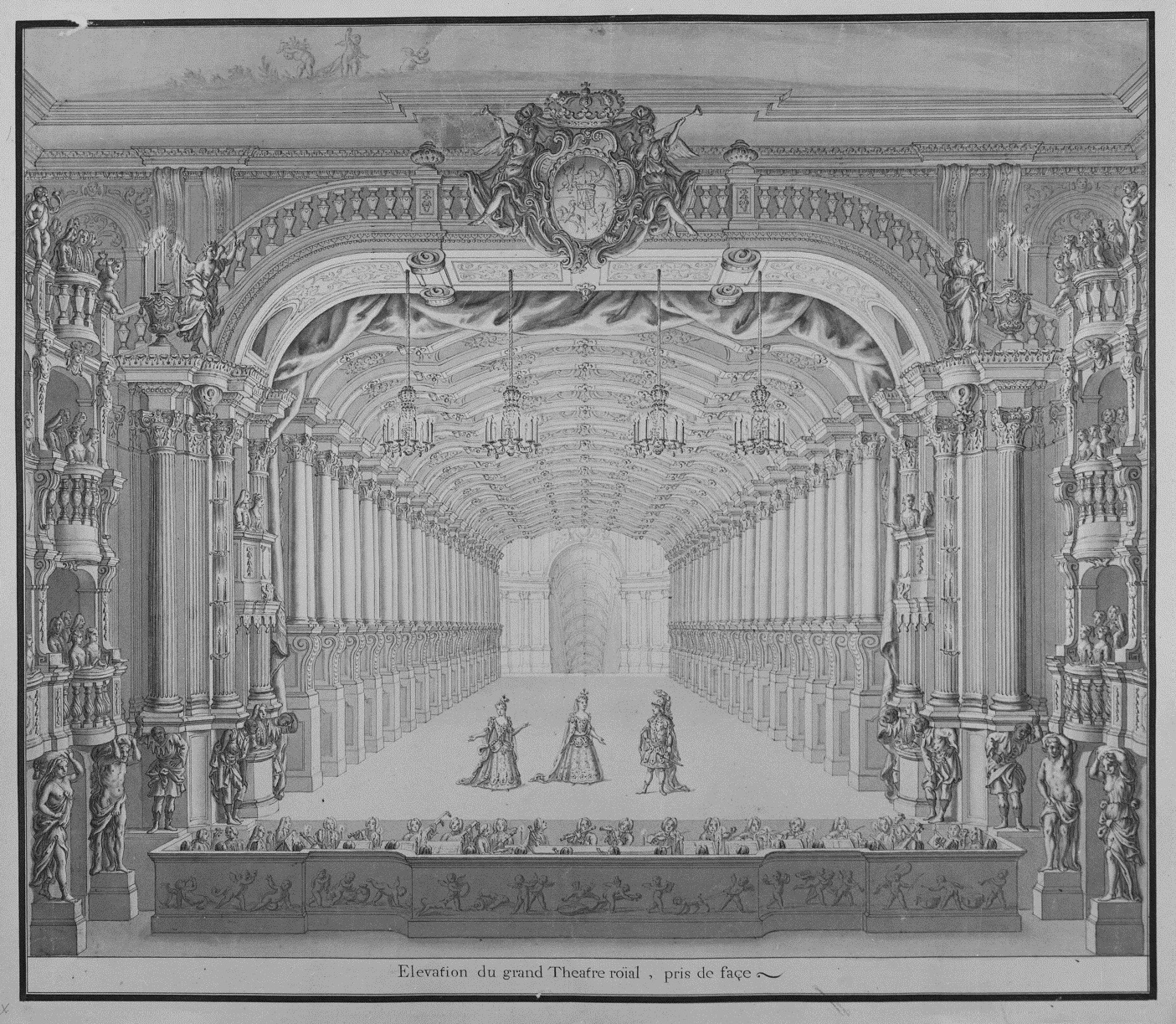
Opera house "am Zwinger" in Dresden, designed by Matthäus Daniel Pöppelmann; interior decorations by Alessandro und Giramolo Mauro. For the wedding of the crown prince in September 1719 three operas composed by Lotti were performed within two weeks. Highlight was Teofane; all the guests had to appear "alla Turca". Drawing by Carl Heinrich Jacob Fehling (1719)

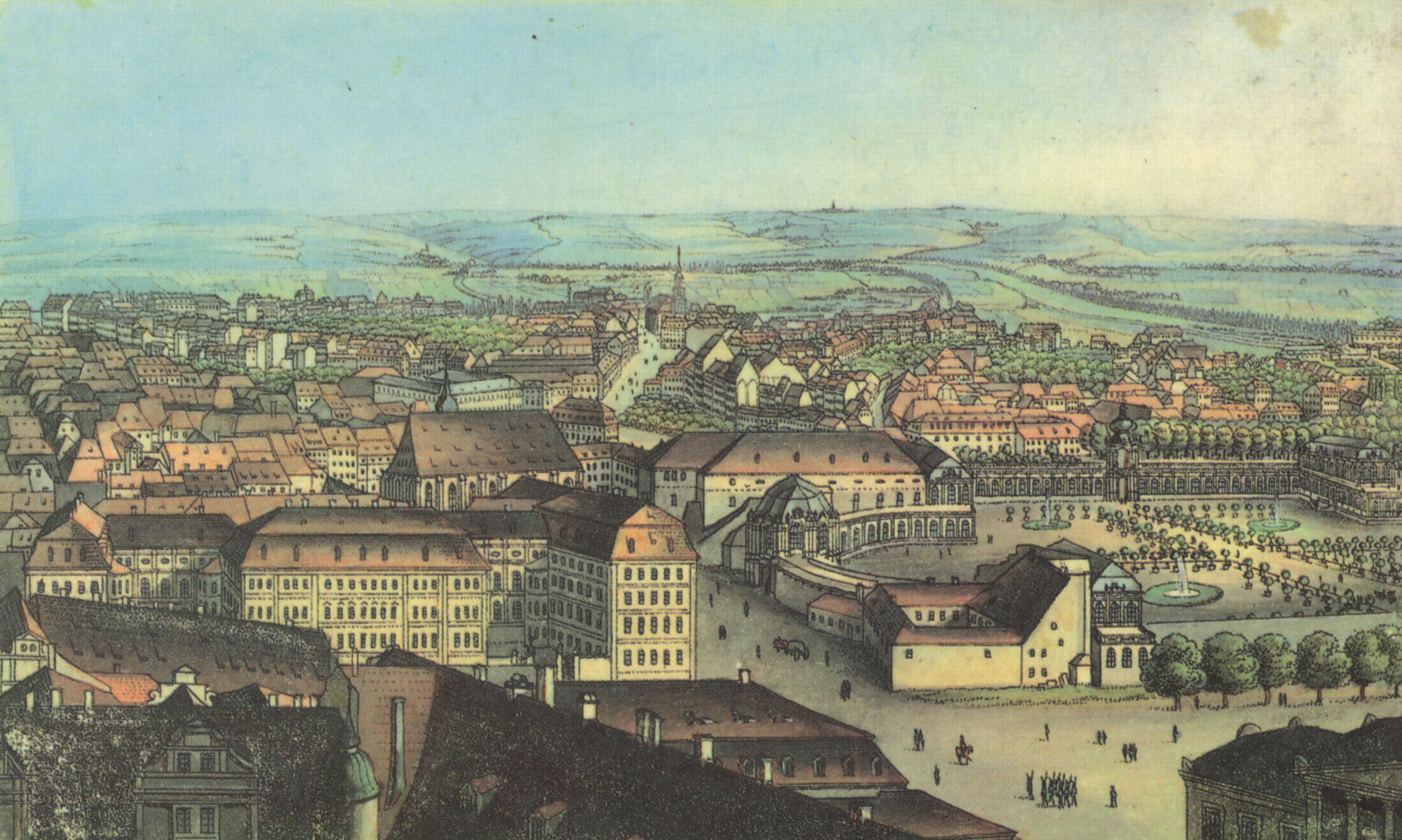
View of Dresden, the opera house am Zwinger right in the middle and before it was destroyed in 1849

To justify his salary, Veracini had to compose chamber music for the court, transferring him to the official payroll as Kapellmeister in August 1717 and not as a violinist. In 1719 Veracini was sent to recruit more Italian singers for the new Dresden opera, "am Zwinger". Whilst in Venice he secured the services of Margherita Durastanti and Vittoria Tesi and in Bologna added Antonia Maria Laurenti. Veracini also took the opportunity to visit his home town where he married Chiara Tesi.

In 1721 Veracini wrote another set of violin sonatas dedicated to the Prince (published in Dresden as his Opus 1). Unfortunately, there was animosity among all these gifted musicians at the court in Dresden. In 1722, the arrogant Veracini was involved in a quarrel, staged according to one source by the composer and violinist Pisendel, which resulted in Veracini leaping out of an upper-story window and breaking his foot in two places and (also) his hip. There are two conflicting accounts of this incident on 13 August, one involving humiliation of Veracini at the hands of the last-desk violinist in the orchestra, who was asked to play the same concerto, replacing Veracini. Pisendel had been rehearsing his composition intensively with this violinist. The braggart Veracini fell into such a rage over this that he did not come out of his room for several days, and out of shame and despair finally publicly threw himself out of a window onto the street in Dresden. According to Veracini the jealous German musicians allegedly plotted to murder him (so he claimed in his writings). He fled Dresden by jumping out a window and apparently broke a leg in the fall. After the incident Veracini walked with a limp for the rest of his life. It is a myth Senesino was involved in the quarrel as he was either dismissed by Heinichen or by the court which ran out of money. G.F. Handel offered the singer a contract for London two years before the alleged incident with Veracini.

These sensational and conflicting reports are further complicated by one more fact, which is actually documented. On 22 March 1723 Veracini's young daughter, Margaretha, died of measles at the composer's house, number 2 Scheffelgasse, in Dresden. The wording of the report seems to imply that Veracini was still in Dresden and employed at the court at that time.

It seems the Dresden musicians, fearing for their position, felt relieved Veracini had left the city. Back in his native Florence in 1723, Veracini played music in a church. During this time he suffered from his bad reputation and was said by Charles Burney to have been "usually qualified with the title of Capo pazzo" ["head lunatic"]. He composed a Te Deum for the coronation of Pope Clement XII in 1730.

His uncle Antonio died in 1733, leaving the bulk of his estate to Francesco Maria. Amongst other things, this included no fewer than eight violins made by Jacob Stainer and three Amatis.

=== London ===
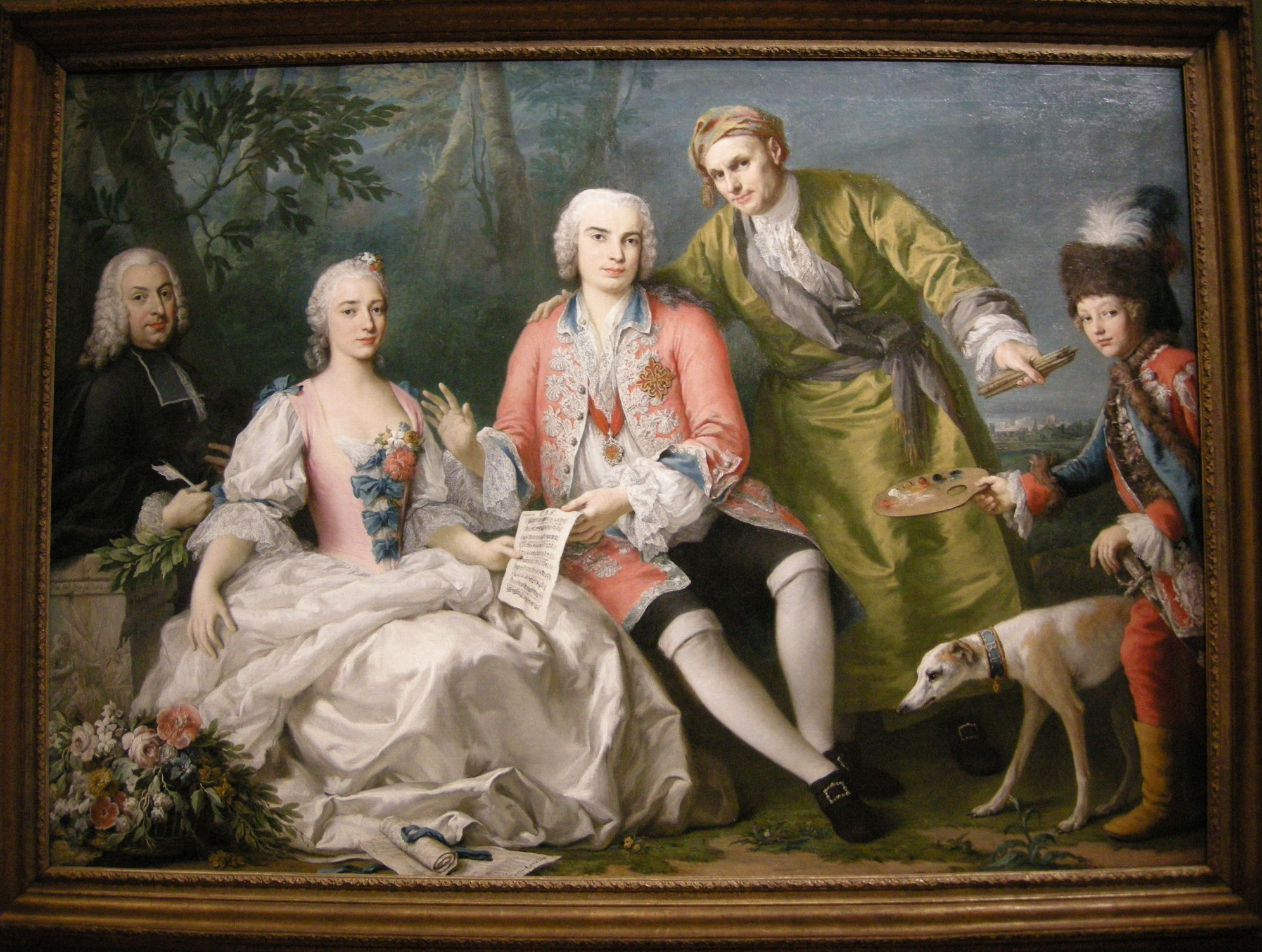
Metastasio on the left, Farinelli in the middle. Next to him the painter Jacopo Amigoni

Back in London in 1733, Veracini appeared in many concerts. In 1735 he composed an opera for the Opera of the Nobility, Adriano in Siria. Francesca Cuzzoni, Antonio Montagnana, Farinelli and Senesino had a role. George Frederic Handel was present at the premiere in Haymarket Theatre. Charles Jennens liked the opera and ordered a score; Lord Hervey, not known for his musical perception, and Henry Liddell, 1st Baron Ravensworth were bored. However, the work enjoyed a run of twenty performances over six months. Many of the arias were published separately by John Walsh. Veracini composed the fifth version, based on Pietro Metastasio's libretto, written for the Habsburg Emperor Charles VI. The score, which survived in the Newman Flower Collection (or the Henry Watson Music Library?) of the Manchester Central Library was developed by German musicologist Holger Schmitt-Hallenberg along with Fabio Biondi, who composed the recitatives that have not been preserved. It was performed in Kraków December 2013 and in Vienna and Madrid in January 2014.

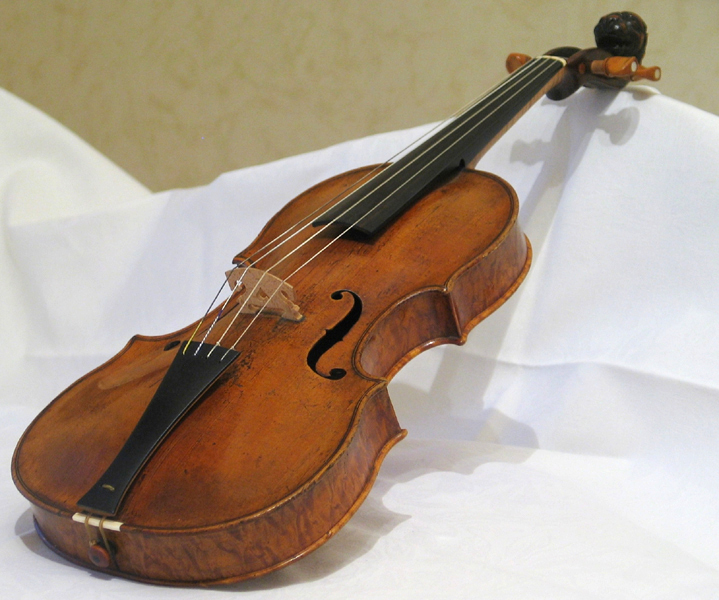
Violin by J. Stainer

In 1736 he wrote some arias for the pasticcio Orfeo by Nicola Porpora. In 1737, he wrote La Clemenza di Tito, on a libretto by Angelo Maria Cori based on Metastasio. In 1738 Veracini wrote his third opera, Partenio, and returned to Florence where he stayed till 1741. Back in London he composed his last opera, Roselinda, based on Shakespeare's play As You Like It, a most unusual choice of material at that time. In that opera Veracini included the well-known Scots ballad tune The Lass of Paties Mill. It was staged in London in 1744, the same year his oratorio L'errore di Salomone was staged. Burney, scorned the music of Roselinda as "wild, awkward, and unpleasant; manifestly produced by a man unaccustomed to write for the voice, and one possessed of a capo pazzo", and ridiculed the inclusion of the ballad tune as an attempt "to flatter the English" that failed because "few of the North Britons, or admirers of this national and natural Music, frequent the opera, or mean to give half a guinea to hear a Scots tune, which perhaps their cook-maid Peggy can sing better than any foreigner", but confessed that "This opera, to my great astonishment when I examined the Music, ran twelve nights", whereas L'errore di Salomone was given only twice. Veracini left London a little more than a year later.

In 1745 or shortly after, he survived a shipwreck in which he lost two of his Stainer violins (the ones he called St. Peter and St. Paul), "thought to have been the best in the world", and all of his effects. He returned to Florence, where he was appointed maestro di capella of the churches of San Pancrazio and San Gaetano, the latter one at which his uncle had worked, focusing on church music. Though he mostly conducted in his later years, he still sometimes appeared as a violinist. Veracini died in Florence.

== Compositions ==
In his last will and testament of 14 October 1768, Veracini mentions a trunk (baule) full of his musical compositions. As his now-surviving works would not fill a quarter of such a large chest, a full assessment of Veracini's stature as composer is not possible. However, his known music has historical importance and artistic value.

The central works of Veracini's known repertoire are contained in three collections of twelve sonatas, each, for solo violin and basso continuo: (1) the manuscript set dated Venice, 26 July 1716 (Diss 70); (2) the published Op. I sonatas (Dresden, 1721); and (3) the lavishly printed Op. II Sonate accademiche (London, 1744). A few additional early sonatas are preserved individually in manuscript.

Veracini's 1716 sonatas incorporate important stylistic innovations. Given the composer's frequent performance of Arcangelo Corelli's solo sonatas, his occasional paraphrasing of Corelli's themes, his generally plain and unornamented melodic lines, and his late-life compositional revision of Corelli's Op. 5, we might look for a continuation of the Corelli tradition, but we do not find it. Instead, whereas Corelli's violin sonatas, both solo and trio, are divided between chamber sonatas composed of dance movements and church sonatas with fugal movements, Veracini's 1716 sonatas contain neither dances nor fugues. Whereas Corelli never recapitulates themes in his non-fugal movements, Veracini always includes some form of melodic recurrence, except in a few very short, transitional movements. Veracini's binary-form movements frequently include a tonic recapitulation, offen including transposed material which, in the first half, was introduced in the key of the dominant. Thus, Veracini's 1716 sonatas are among the earliest to employ what we now call rounded-binary form, sometimes thought of as embryonic sonata form. Further, whereas Corelli relies on melodic-harmonic sequences as his principal means of expansion, Veracini far more often employs repetition for the same purpose. And while Corelli confines repetition to the concluding phrases of movements, Veracini uses repetition in all parts of his: beginning, middle, and ending phrases. Thus, Veracini's repetitions help to create passages that are melodically and harmonically sable or even static, which tend to contribute to hierarchical, symmetrical phrase structures that stand in contrast to Corelli's discursive formal processes. While Corelli is known for his careful part-writing and dissonance treatment, Veracini often introduces unprepared dissonances, transferred resolutions, leaps by dissonant intervals, cross relations, and very unusual deceptive cadences. Thus, Charles Burney, who heard him play, reported that, although Veracini impressed London audiences in 1714 as a violinist, "His compositions, however, were too wild and flighty for the taste of the English at this time, when they regarded the sonatas of Corelli as the models of simplicity, grace, and elegance in melody, and of correctness and purity in harmony."

Burney, in another place, viewed Veracini's "wild and flighty" music as prophetic: "Veracini and Vivaldi had the honour of being thought mad for attempting in their works and performance what many a sober gentleman has since done uncensured; but both these musicians happening to be gifted with more fancy and more hand than their neighbours, were thought insane; as friar Bacon, for superior science, was thought a magician, and Galileo a heretic." And, comparing these early sonatas by Veracini with those of Giovanni Battista Pergolesi, Burney writes, "They [Pergolesi's] are composed in a style that was worn out when Pergolesi began to write; at which time another [style] was forming by Tartini, Veracini, and Martini [Sammartini] of Milan, which has been since [by 1789] polished, refined, and enriched with new melodies, harmonies, and modulation, and effects."

The six overtures, i.e., orchestral suites for two oboes, bassoon, strings, and basso continuo that Veracini wrote in Venice at about the same time as his first set of twelve violin sonatas, have been described as "wild and flighty". They feature dissonance and accidentals, incessant repetition, short, clearly articulated phrase groups, and melodic recurrence, often in the form of a rondo or da capo. The movements are longer, which may explain the more extensive use of sequence. The first movements that take the format of the French overture include a fugal section.

Veracini dedicated his 1716 sonatas to Prince Friedrich August of Saxony, who was then on a nine-month tour of Italy, during which he and the leader of his chamber music, Johann Georg Pisendel, were recruiting musicians and collecting music thought to be the coming thing. Veracini was among those recruited and collected. Back in Dresden, Pisendel absorbed and digested this new musical style and passed it on to his students, including Franz Benda and Johann Gottlieb Graun. What he passed on to these students was subsequently codified by Joseph Riepel, in his Anfangsgründe zur Musikalischen Setzkunst (1752) and Grundregeln zur Tonordnung insgemein (1755), texts which contributed to the musical education of Wolfgang Amadeus Mozart.

After the sonatas of 1716, one would have expected Veracini to pursue a stylistic path similar to Giuseppe Tartini's. The road he chose instead is indicated by his published Opus 1 of 1721. In some ways these sonatas are more, not less, like Corelli's than were those of 1716. The set is divided into chamber and church sonatas, the latter including fugues with the kind of three-voice exposition familiar from Corelli's Opus 5. There is much imitative writing even in non-fugal movements. Phrase elision is slightly more prevalent. Although repetition is a little more common, there are no complete tonic recapitulations. There is, instead, great variety and experimentation in formal design of a sort not found in the sonatas of Locatelli or Tartini.

In the Opus 2 sonatas (1744), texture and form are even more complicated and the whole style more original than in the earlier sonatas. The most original, complicated, and extended of the unusually long movements that form the Opus 2 sonatas are those entitled capriccio. Veracini defines this term in his treatise, Il trionfo della prattica musicale (manuscript, ca. 1760): "The CAPRICCIO has the same rules as the true fugue and the ricercar, but it supports within it the entry of various bizzarie grafted on by the imagination of the wise composer, because they [the bizzarie] are able to confabulate with the principal subjects of this type of composition." Veracini's capricci are essentially fugues with an unusually large number of independent motives. In some of his capricci, motives are developed by means of interval substitution, sequencing, inversion, and fragmentation. The capricci of Veracini's Opus 2 do not feature binary form but rather a highly original technique of pairing passages, the parallelism between which is usually modified by some small insertion, deletion, or reordering and by either transposition of the whole, contrapuntal inversion, motivic inversion, or exchange of tonic and dominant harmony in the manner of a fugal counter-exposition. Contrapuntal inversion, in particular, is found on nearly every page of the capricci.

Veracini's compositional revision of Corelli's Op. 5 sonatas, made after 1745, continues the trend toward contrapuntal thoroughness. These "Dissertazioni del sig. Francesco Veracini sopra l'Opera Quinta del Corelli" strive for more imitation and contrapuntal inversion, more intensive use of motives, greater unity and symmetry, and greater logic and consistency, even to the point of pedantry. Symmetrical pairs of passages, of the sort used in Veracini's Op. 2, are created in nine of Corelli's movements by adding contrapuntal inversion or by reshuffling, transposing, and revising phrases of the originals. The musical examples in Veracini's late treatise continue the same pattern.

Of Veracini's five surviving violin concertos, only the earliest, from 1712, hints at his technical prowess as a performer, and, even here, substantial portions of the solo part consist of blank staves bearing the instruction "capriccio del primo violino." Veracini's other four violin concertos make more moderate demands. Their style is somewhat like Vivaldi's with the significant difference that their solo episodes often incorporate thematic elements from the opening ritornellos: a trait often associated with Tartini's concertos and which give rise to the "double exposition" feature of later eighteenth-century keyboard concertos.

Of Veracini's four London operas, only Adriano in Siria (1735) survives. Some arias from his Partenio (1738) and Rosalinda (1744) were printed by Walsh during Veracini's stay in London. In Adriano the arias written for Farinelli are both virtuosic and strongly expressive.

=== Major works ===
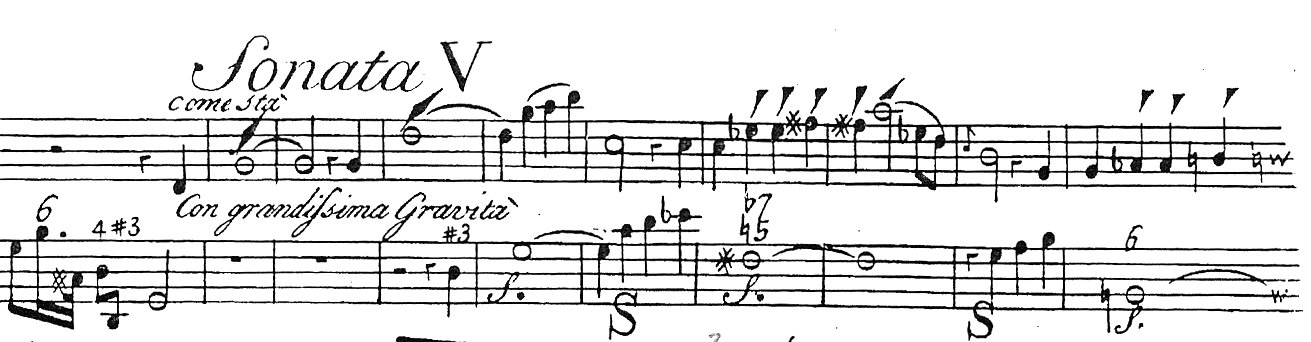
Incipit from Veracini's Violin Sonata Op. 2, No. 5 (1744)

- 12 Sonatas for recorder or violin solo and basso (no opus number, dedicated to Prince Friedrich August, before 1716, unpublished in the composer's lifetime)
- Opus 1, 12 Sonatas for violin solo and basso (dedicated to Prince Friedrich August 1721)
- Opus 2, 12 Sonate Accademiche for violin solo and basso (1744)
- Dissertazioni del Sigr. Francesco Veracini sopra l'opera quinta del Corelli [Dissertation by Mr. Francesco Veracini on Corelli's Opus 5] (date of composition uncertain, unpublished until 1961)
- Opus 3, Il trionfo della pratica musicale, o sia Il maestro dell'arte scientifica dal quale imparasi non solo il contrapunto ma (quel che più importa) insegna ancora con nuovo e facile metodo l'ordine vero di comporre in musica (music-theory treatise, 1760)

== Discography ==
- Adriano in Siria. Sonia Prina, Adriano; Ann Hallenberg, Fernaspe; Roberta Invernizzi, Emirena; Romina Basso, Sabina; Lucia Cirillo, Idalma; Ugo Guaguardo, Osroa; Europa Galante led by Fabio Bionbi, violin. 3 CDs. Fra Bernado fb 1409491, Vienna, 2014. [This is a recording of the edition published as Francesco Maria Veracini, Adriano in Siria: drama per musica, Belcanto Rarities, vol. III, ed. Holger Schmitt-Hallenberg, Älgarås, Sweden: Edition Gran Tonante, [2014], which is based on a manuscript in Manchester, Henry Watson Music Library, GB-Mp MS f520 VL61, a source that includes the overture, opening chorus, and arias, but no recitativi secchi. The recitatives in the 2014 edition and recording, according to reviewer David Vickers (GRAMOPHONE [02/2015]), were taken from or based upon those contained in the score by Giovanni Battista Ferrandini (Munich, 1738), as preserved in the Sächsische Landesbibliothek, Dresden (D-Dl): Mus.3037-F-1. A digital scan of this score is preserved by IMSLP. A complete manuscript score of Veracini's opera Adriano in Siria, with recitatives, was identified by RISM researchers in the Bayerische Staatsbibliothek (D-Mbs), Mus.ms. 143, after the 2014 editioin and recording were made. This score is available from IMSLP on line.]
- The Art of Bel Canto. Richard Tucker, tenor; John Wustman, piano and harpsichord. LP. Columbia ML 6067 Also issued in stereo, MS 6667 [U.S.]: Columbia, 1965. [Includes Veracini: "Meco verrai su quella" (Pastorale) from 'Rosalinda']
- The Art of Joseph Szigeti, vol. 1. Joseph Szigeti, violin; Kurt Ruhrseitz, piano (Recorded 1926–1933). 2 CDs (mono). London, England: Biddulph Recordings, 1989. LAB 005, LAB 006. [Includes Veracini: Largo, from an unidentified sonata.]
- An Arthur Grumiaux Recital. Arthur Grumiaux, violin; Riccardo Castagnone, piano. LP (mono). Epic LC 3414 [United States]: Epic Records, 1957. [Includes Veracini: Sonata in A major, op. 1, no.7.]
- Baroque Masters of Venice, Naples and Tuscany. Soloists of the Società cameristica di Lugano. LP. "A Cycnus recording, Paris." [New York]: Nonesuch Records, 1966. HC 3008. [Includes an unidentified work by Veracini]
- Concerti "per l'orchestra di Dresda". Musica Antiqua Köln; Reinhard Goebel, dir. CD. Archiv Produktion 447 644–2. Hamburg: Deutsche Grammophon, 1993. [Includes Veracini: Ouverture No. 5 in B-flat major.]
- Flute Solos. James J Pellerite, flute; Wallace Hornibrook, piano. Coronet LPS 1505 (LP). Columbus, Ohio: Coronet, [1960s]. [Includes Veracini: Sonata no. 1 (1716).]
- French and Italian Flute Music. Barthold Kuijken, flute; Wieland Kuijken, viola da gamba; Robert Kohnen, harpsichord. 2 CDs. Accent ACC 30009. Heidelberg: Accent, 2007. [Sonatas; violin, continuo; op. 1, no. 6, arranged for flute and continuo]
- Furiosi. I Furiosi (Gabrielle McLaughlin, soprano; Aisslinn Nosky, Julia Wedman, violin; Felix Deak, violoncello, viola da gamba); with James Johnstone, harpsichord; Stephanie Martin, organ; Lucas Harris, theorbo and guitar. CD. Dorian DSL-90802. Winchester, VA: Dorian, 2007. [Includes Veracini: Passagallo, first movement from Sonata, op. 2, no. 12 in D minor.]
- Italian Baroque Songs. Dénes Gulyás, tenor; Dániel Benkö, lute, guitar, orpharion; László Czidra, recorder; Tibor Alpár, organ; Budapest Baroque Trio; Bakfark Consort. CD. Hungaroton HCD 31480. [Hungary]: Hungaroton, 1992. [Includes Veracini: Sonata for violin, continuo, op. 1; No. 3.]
- Italian Baroque Violin Concerti. Carroll Glenn, violin; Austrian Tonkuenstler Orchestra, Vienna; Lee Schaenen, conductor. LP. Musical Heritage Society MHS 652 New York: Musical Heritage Society, 1966. [Includes Veracini: Concerto for Violin and Orchestra in D major]
- The Italian Connection: Vivaldi, Corelli, Geminiani, Lonati, Veracini, Matteis. Bell'arte Antiqua (Lucy van Dael, Jacqueline Ross, violins; William Hunt, viola da gamba; Terence Charlston, harpsichord). CD. London: ASV, 2000. CD GAU 199. [Includes Veracini: Sonata in A, op. 2, no. 9]
- Italian Music for Strings of the Baroque Period. Cambridge Society for Early Music; Erwin Bodky, director; Ruth Posselt, Richard Burgin, violins. LP (mono). Kapp KCL 9024 [Includes Veracini: Sonata op. 1, no. 3.]
- An Italian Sojourn. Trio Settecento. CD. Chicago: Cedille, 2006. [Includes Veracini: Sonata in D minor, op. 2, no. 12.]
- Italian Violin Sonatas. Europa Galante (Fabio Biondi, violin and direction; Maurizio Naddeo, violoncello; Giangiacomo Pinardi, theorbo, baroque guitar, cittern; Sergio Ciomei, harpsichord, organ, gracivembalo, clavichord). Virgin Veritas 5 45588 2 (CD). [England]: Virgin, 2002. [Includes Veracini: Sonata in G minor, op. 1 no. 1]
- Italienische Blockflötenmusik des 17. und 18. Jahrhunderts. Eckhardt Haupt, recorder; Achim Beyer, violin; Christine Schornsheim, harpsichord; Siegfried Pank, tenor viola da gamba. CD. Capriccio 10 234. Königsdorf: Delta Music GmbH, 1988. [Includes Veracini: Sonata no. 6 in A minor (1716)]
- Blockflötenwerke von 10 italienischen Meistern. Frans Brüggen, recorder; Anner Bylsma, violoncello; Gustav Leonhardt, harpsichord and organ. 3LPs. Telefunken Das Alte Werk 6.35073. Hamburg: Telefunken, 1968–74. Reissued on CD as Italian Recorder Sonatas. Teldec 4509-93669-2. Hamburg: Teldec 1995. [Includes Veracini: Sonata no. 2 (1716) in G major; Sonata no. 6 (1716) in A minor]
- Masters of the Italian Baroque. Steven Staryk, violin. Kenneth Gilbert, harpsichord. LP. Baroque BUS 2874. Baroque Records, [1967]. [Includes Veracini: Sonata in E minor.]
- Maurice André Plays Trumpet Concertos. Maurice André, trumpet; Pierre Pierlot, oboe; Orchestre de chambre Jean-François Paillard, Jean François Paillard, cond. (LP) New York, N.Y.: Musical Heritage Society, 1969. [Includes Veracini: Sonata in E minor for violin and continuo, op. 2, no. 8, arranged as a trumpet concerto by Jean Thilde]
- Six Italian Sonatas. Michel Piguet, baroque oboe and recorder; Walther Stiftner, baroque bassoon; Martha Gmünder, harpsichord. Musical Heritage Society MHS 1864 (LP). New York: Musical Heritage Society, 1974. [Includes Veracini: Sonata prima in F major for recorder and harpsichord.] Title from container./ "Recorded by Erato."
- Tetrazzini. Luisa Tetrazzini, soprano; with unidentified orchestras. Recorded between 1909 and 1914, digitally re-recorded from the original 78 rpm discs. CD. Wyastone Leys, Monmouth: Nimbus Records, 1990. [Includes Veracini: "Meco sulla verrai" (Pastorale), from Rosalinda.]
- Veracini, Francesco Maria. 5 ouvertures / Ouvertüren / Overtures. Musica Antiqua Köln; Reinhard Goebel, dir. CD. Archiv Produktion 439 937-2. Hamburg: Deutsche Grammophon, 1994. [Ouvertures No. 1 B-flat major; No. 2 in F major; No. 3 in B-flat major; No. 4 in F major; No. 6 in B-flat major.]
- Veracini, Francesco Maria: Complete Overtures and Concertos, vol. 1. Accademia i Filarmonici; Alberto Martini, conductor. CD. Naxos 8.553412. Munich: Naxos, 1995.
- Veracini, Francesco Maria: Complete Overtures and Concertos, vol. 2 Accademia i Filarmonici; Alberto Martini, conductor. CD. Naxos 8.553413. [Hong Kong]: Naxos, 1999. [Concerto a otto stromenti in D major for violin and orchestra; Overture no. 5 in B-flat major; Concerto a cinque in A major for violin, strings, and continuo; Concerto a cinque in D major for violin strings, and continuo; Aria schiavona in B-flat major for orchestra.]
- Veracini, Francesco Maria. The Complete Sonatas, op. 1. Hyman Bress, violin; Jean Schrick, viola da Gamba; Oliver Alain, harpsichord. 3 LPs. Lyrichord and LLST 7141 (set); LLST 7138, LLST 7139, LLST 7140. Lyrichord;. New York: Lyrichord Records, 1965.
- Veracini, Francesco Maria. Nine Sonatas for Violin and Basso Continuo. Piero Toso, violin; Gianni Chiampan, violoncello; Edoardo Farina, harpsichord. 2 LPs. Erato 71197. Reissued on Musical Heritage Society MHS 4293, MHS 4294. Tinton Falls, N.J.: Musical Heritage Society, 1978. [Includes Sonatas in G minor, op. 1, no. 1; A major, op. 1, no. 2; B minor, op. 1, no. 3; E minor, op. 1, no. 6; A major, op. 1, no. 7; B-flat major, op. 1, no. 8; D major, op. 1, no. 10; E major, op. 1, no. 11; F major, op. 1, no. 12.] "Licensed from."
- Veracini, Francesco Maria. Six Sonatas for Flute and Harpsichord. Giorgio Bernabò, flute; Alan Curtis, harpsichord. CD. Dynamic CDS 114. Genoa: Dynamic Srl, 1994. [Sonatas no. 1, 3, 4, 5, 11, and 12 (1716).]
- Veracini, Francesco Maria. Sonatas. John Holloway, violin; Jaap ter Linden, cello; Lars Ulrik Mortensen, harpsichord. CD. ECM New Series Munich: ECM Records, 2003. [Sonata no. 1 from Sonate a violino solo e basso, op. 1; Sonata no. 5 from Sonate a violino, o flauto solo, e basso (1716); Sonata no. 1 from Dissertazioni—sopra l'opera quinta del Corelli, Sonata no. 6 from Sonate accademiche, op. 2]
- Veracini, Francesco Maria. Sonate accademiche. Fabio Biondi, violin; Maurizio Naddeo, violoncello; Rinaldo Alessandrini, harpsichord; Pascal Monteilhet, theorbo. CD. Paris, France: Opus 111, 1995. OPS 30–138. [Includes Veracini: Sonatas op. 2, nos. 7, 8, 9, and 12]
- Veracini, Francesco Maria: Sonate accademiche. The Locatelli Trio (Elizabeth Wallfisch, violin; Richard Tunnicliffe, violoncello; Paul Nicholson, harpsichord & organ). 3 CDs. Hyperion CDA 66871/3. London: Hyperion Records Ltd., 1995. Reissued 2007, Hyperion CDS44241/3.
- The Virtuose Italienische Blockflötenmusik. Michael Schneider, recorder; Michael McCraw, bassoon; Gerhart Darmstadt, cello; Bradford Tracey, harpsichord. CD. FSM Adagio FCD 91 634 Münster: Fono Schallplattengesellschaft mbH, 1990. [Includes Veracini: Sonata no. 4 in B-flat major (1716).]
- The Virtuoso Harmonica. Adalberto Borioli, harmonica; Mirna Miglioranzi-Borioli, harpsichord. LP. Everest SDBR 3172. Los Angeles, Calif.: Everest, 1967. [Includes Veracini: Sonata in F major]
- The Virtuoso Recorder. Frans Brüggen, recorder; Janny van Wering, harpsichord. LP. Decca DL 710049. New York: Decca, 1962. [Includes Veracini: Sonata in G major (1716)]
- The Virtuoso Violinist. David Nadien, violin; Boris Barere, piano. LP. Kapp KCL 9060. [U.S.]: Kapp Records, 1961 [Includes Veracini: Largo, from Sonate accademiche, no. 6.]

== Sources ==
- Anon. 1734. Adriano in Siria: Dramma per musica. Versione sintetica a cura di www.librettidopera.it (accessed 1 February 2014).
- Anon. 2013. "Adriano in Siria: Dramma per musica". Libretti d'opera italiana (www.librettidopera.it, accessed 3 February 2014).
- Anon. 2014. About the Henry Watson Music Library: Central Library Temporary Closure. (Accessed 1 February 2014).
- Blichmann, Diana (2010). Ortrun Landmann; Hans-Günter Ottenberg; Wolfgang Mende (eds.). Der Venedig-Augenhalt Pisendels (1716-1717): Erlebnisse im Gefolge des sächsischen Kurprinzen Friedrich August als Auslöser eines Kulturtansfers von Venedig nach Dresden. Johann Georg Pisendel–Studien zur Leben und Werk: Bericht über das Internationale Symposium vom 23. bis 25. Mai 2005 in Dresden. Dresdner Beiträge zur Musikforschung. Vol. 3. Hildeshiem: Georg Olms Verlag. pp. 1–58.
- Bukofzer, Manfred F. (1975) [1st pub. 1947]. Music in the Baroque Era: From Monteverdi to Bach. New York City: W. W. Norton – Reprint London: J. M. Dent & Sons, 1948. ISBN 0-460-03431-6.
- Burney, Charles (1789). A General History of Music, from the Earliest Ages to the Present Period. To Which Is Prefixed, a Dissertation on the Music of the Ancients. Vol. 4 vols. (2nd ed.). London: Printed for the author and sold by T. Becket, J. Robson, and G. Robinson.
- Charlton, David. 2000. "Johann David Heinichen (1683–1729)". ClassicalNet (accessed 3 February 2014).
- Hill, John Walter (1972). The Life and Works of Francesco Maria Veracini (Ph.D.). Harvard University. [Contains transcriptions of source documents omitted from Hill 1979. Available as PDF from ProQuest.]
- Hill, John Walter (1975). "Veracini in Italy". Music & Letters. 56: 27–47.
- Hill, John Walter (1979). The Life and Works of Francesco Maria Veracini. Ann Arbor: UMI Research Press.
- Hill, John Walter (1980). "The Anti Galant Attitude of F. M. Veracini". In John Walter Hill (ed.). Studies in Musicology in Honor of Otto E. Albrecht. Kassel: Bärenreiter. pp. 158–196.
- Hill, John Walter (November 1990). "Antonio Veracini in Context: New Perspectives from Documents, Analysis, and Style". Early Music. 18 (4): 545–62. doi:10.1093/earlyj/XVIII.4.545.
- Hill, John Walter. 1998. "Francesco Maria Veracini's Adriano in Siria (1735)," Antiquae musicae italicae studiosi: Bollettino dell'Associazione, 3536 (1998), 223.
- Hill, John Walter (2001). "Veracini, Francesco Maria". In Stanley Sadie; John Tyrrell (eds.). The New Grove Dictionary of Music and Musicians (2nd ed.). London: Macmillan Publishers.
- Hill, John Walter (2010). "Joseph Riepel's Music Theory in Connection with the Music of Pisendel and His Students". In Ortrun Landmann; Hans-Günter Ottenberg; Wolfgang Mende (eds.). Johann Georg Pisendel–Studien zur Leben und Werk: Bericht über das Internationale Symposium vom 23. bis 25. Mai 2005 in Dresden. Dresdner Beiträge zur Musikforschung. Vol. 3. Hildeshiem: Georg Olms Verlag. pp. 189–213.
- Hill, John Walter (2014). Joseph Riepel's Theory of Metric and Tonal Order, Phrase and Form: A Translation of His Anfansgründe zur musicalischen Setzkunst, Chapters 1 and 2 (1752/54, 1755) with Commentary. Harmonologia: Studies in Music Theory. Vol. 20. Hillsdale, NY: Pendragon Press.
- Lecerf de la Viéville de Fresneuse, Jean Laurent. 1722. "Des Französischen Anwalds", [translated and edited by Johann Mattheson], in Critica Musica 1, no. 3, parts 7 (November): 189–207, and 8 (December): 209–31.
- Libby, Denis (1973). "Interrelationships in Corelli". Journal of the American Musicological Society. 26: 263–287. doi:10.2307/830667. JSTOR 830667.
- [Mattheson, Johann]. 1722. "Neues: Von musicalischen Sachen und Personen: Dresden". Critica Musica 1, no. 2, part 5 (September): 151–52.
- [Mattheson, Johann]. 1723. "[Neues: Von musicalischen Sachen und Personen: Dresden]". Critica Musica 1, no. 4, part 10 (February): 287–88 (accessed 7 February 2014).
- Ministry of Culture and National Heritage of the Republic of Poland. 2013. "Jacek Majchrowski, Mayor of the City of Krakow, Invites: Europa Galante". Serwis www.operarara.pl website (accessed 1 February 2014).
- O'Brien, Eileen (1993). A Critical Edition with a Commentary of 6 Ouvertures by Francesco Maria Veracini (MA). University College Cork.
- Rees, Abraham.1819. "Veracini, Antonio". The Cyclopædia: Or, Universal Dictionary of Arts, Sciences, and Literature, Volume 36. London: Longman, Hurst, Rees, Orme & Brown.
- Sadie, Julie Anne (1998). Companion to Baroque Music. University of California Press. ISBN 9780520214149.
- Talbot, Michael. 1974. "Some Overlooked MSS in Manchester". The Musical Times 115, no. 1581 (November): 942-44.
- Torchi, Luigi (1969) [1901]. La musica istrumentale in Italia nei secoli XVI, XVII e XVIII, con 272 esempi musicali nel testo (Facsimile reprint of Forni Editore ed.). Turin: Fratelli Bocca.
