= Motezuma =

Opera by Antonio Vivaldi

- Opera by Antonio Vivaldi
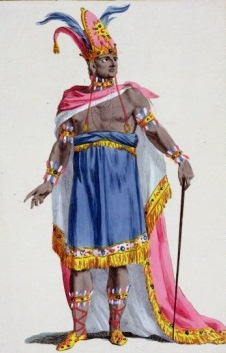
- 18th-century depiction of the Aztec ruler Montezuma, the opera's protagonist
- Librettist: Alvise Giusti
- Premiere: 14 November 1733; Teatro Sant'Angelo, Venice

Motezuma, RV 723, is an opera in three acts by Antonio Vivaldi with an Italian libretto by Alvise Giusti. The libretto is very loosely based on the life of the Aztec ruler Montezuma who died in 1520. The first performance was given in the Teatro Sant'Angelo in Venice on 14 November 1733. (In earlier reference books the opera is referred to as Montezuma, but since the reappearance of the original manuscript this has been corrected to Motezuma.) The music was thought to have been lost, but was discovered in 2002 in the archive of the music library of the Sing-Akademie zu Berlin. Its first fully staged performance in modern times took place in Düsseldorf, Germany, on 21 September 2005.

== Background and performance history ==
Vivaldi's librettist was the Venetian lawyer Girolamo Giusti. His libretto was a highly fictionalised account of an episode in the life of the Aztec ruler Montezuma. The opera has a happy ending, unlike the real Montezuma who was killed during the initial stages of the Spanish conquest of Mexico. The opera, which premiered on 14 November 1733 at the Teatro Sant'Angelo in Venice, was one of the earliest to be based on a subject from the Americas. According to Michael Talbot in The Vivaldi Compendium, for its time Giusti's libretto "evinces a rare degree of sympathy for the Mexican emperor and his queen Mirena." At the premiere the role of Mirena was sung by Anna Girò, who was a protégée of Vivaldi and whom he considered his "indispensable" prima donna. The title role was sung by the German bass Massimiliano Miler. Unusually for Vivaldi, who preferred castrato singers with contralto voices, he wrote two roles for soprano castrati—Fernando (Cortés) and Asperano, the Mexican general. The choreographer at the premiere was Giovanni Gallo. The sets were designed by Antonio Mauro.

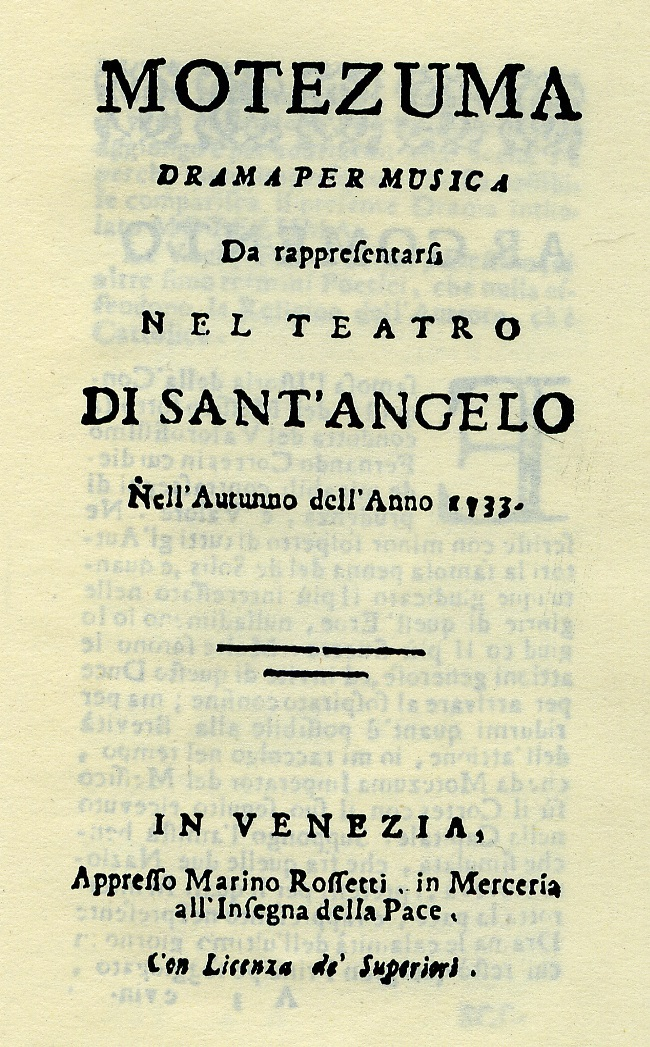
Title page of the libretto printed for the Venice premiere in 1733

Although the libretto printed at the time of the premiere survived, the music was thought to have been lost until it was rediscovered in 2002. After World War II, the Sing-Akademie's library was captured by the Red Army and taken to the Soviet Union, eventually ending up in Kyiv, now in Ukraine. Following the restitution of the Sing-Akademie collection to Germany, the fragmentary score of Motezuma (the beginning of the first act and large parts of third are missing) was identified by the musicologist Steffen Voss. Musicologists began working on reconstructing a version suitable for performance. The Sing-Akademie then asserted that they had a publication right, including derivative rights such as performing rights, to the opera.

A concert version of the opera, apparently the first performance since the 18th century, was performed on 11 June 2005 in the Concert Hall De Doelen in Rotterdam conducted by Federico Maria Sardelli. On 18 July 2005, a version of Motezuma was to have been performed by the Opera Barga Festival in Italy, also conducted by Sardelli. The Rotterdam performance had gone ahead only after a substantial payment to the Sing-Akademie. However, the Barga performance was halted by an injunction, with a potential €250,000 penalty for non-compliance. The reason given was that German law offers copyright protection to entities such as the Sing-Akademie that publish previously inaccessible works. Because the injunction was issued one week before the date of the Barga performance, a "pastiche" was performed. The Motezuma libretto recitatives were spoken, and other Vivaldi arias sung between them. In mid-September 2005, the injunction was lifted which allowed the first staged performance in modern times to take place on 21 September 2005 in Düsseldorf, Germany, as part of the Altstadtherbst festival. It was performed by l'Orchestra Modo Antiquo conducted again by Sardelli. The Düsseldorf production was directed by Uwe Schmitz-Gielsdorf and designed by Paolo Atzori.

The American premiere was held on 28 March 2009, in Long Beach, California, staged and performed by the Long Beach Opera with musical accompaniment by Musica Angelica directed by David Schweizer and conducted by Andreas Mitisek.

== Roles ==
Role	Voice type	Premiere cast, 14 November 1733
Motezuma, Emperor of Mexico	bass-baritone	Massimiliano Miler
Mitrena, his wife	contralto	Anna Girò
Teutile, his daughter	soprano	Gioseffa Pircker
Fernando, General of the Spanish armies	soprano castrato	Francesco Bilanzoni
Ramiro, his younger brother	mezzo-soprano (en travesti)	Angiola Zanuchi
Asprano, General of the Mexicans	soprano castrato	Marianino Nicolini

== Recordings ==
- Deutsche Grammophon recording by Il Complesso Barocco, conducted by Alan Curtis, which is based on a reconstruction of the complete opera by the Italian baroque violinist and composer Alessandro Ciccolini. A DVD of the performance is also available.

== References in literature ==
- In Alejo Carpentier's novel Baroque Concerto, the nameless main character, who is related to a Conquistador, visits Venice in 1709. He befriends Antonio Vivaldi, as well as Domenico Scarlatti and George Frideric Handel. During the Carnival, he wears a mask of Montezuma. An intrigued Vivaldi asks for an explanation of the story. Upon hearing of the Spanish conquest of the Aztec Empire, Vivaldi decides to write an opera based on it. The resulting opera is Motezuma.

== See also ==
Other operas with Montezuma as the protagonist:

- Montezuma (1755) by Carl Heinrich Graun
- Motezuma (1771) by Josef Mysliveček
- Montezuma (1963) by Roger Sessions
- La Conquista (2005) by Lorenzo Ferrero

A related opera (in which Montezuma himself does not appear):

- Fernand Cortez, ou La conquête du Mexique (1809) by Gaspare Spontini
