= Luigi Giusti =

Luigi (Alvise) Giusti (Venice, 1709 – Vienna, 1766) was a Venetian lawyer, poet, and librettist.

He is often confused with his uncle, Girolamo Giusti (1703 – ?), who also wrote libretti. Between them, they produced at least four, although it has been unclear which Giusti wrote which libretto, and sometimes they have been wrongly assumed to be the same person. In the past, the libretto for Vivaldi's 1733 opera Motezuma had been attributed to Girolamo on the basis of a later archivist handwriting the name on a printed copy. However, according to Michael Talbot writing in The Vivaldi Compendium, "the scholarly consensus is that Alvise is at least the author of the libretto for Vivaldi's Motezuma."

He married Francesca Manzoni in 1741, but the death of his young wife in childbirth in June 1743 radically changed his existence. Deeply saddened, he was ordained a priest, and in August 1745, he became secretary to the plenipotentiary minister of Austrian Lombardy, Gian Luca Pallavicini, increasingly distancing himself from poetry to dedicate himself to administrative tasks. He was in the service of Pallavicini between 1745 and 1753, and then of his successor Beltrame Cristiani until 1757, when he moved to Vienna, to work for State Chancellor Kaunitz where he was charged with dealing with Lombardy.
