= Antonio Veracini =

Italian composer

Antonio Veracini (17 January 1659 – 26 October 1733) was an Italian composer and violinist of the Baroque era.

Veracini was born in Florence, Grand Duchy of Tuscany, the eldest son of Francesco di Niccolò Veracini, a noted violinist who ran a music school, and from whom Antonio first learned to play the violin. When his father's health began to fail around 1708, Antonio took over the running of the school, where he taught the violin to (amongst others) his nephew Francesco Maria Veracini (1690–1768), later a celebrated violinist and composer in his own right. Unlike his nephew, who travelled widely, Antonio rarely left Florence. He did visit Rome on two occasions, where he is believed to have met Arcangelo Corelli, and in 1720 he briefly visited Vienna (Hill 2001).

Antonio Veracini died in 1733, aged 74.

== Compositions ==
The only surviving compositions by Veracini are the three printed editions of his chamber music:

- Sonate a tre [10], for 2 violins, viol or archlute, and basso continuo (for the organ), Op. 1 (Florence, 1692)
- Sonate da camera [10], for solo violin, Op. 2 (Modena, c.1694)
- Sonate da camera a due [10], for violin, viol or archlute, and basso continuo (for the harpsichord), Op. 3 (Modena, 1696)

He is known to have composed at least three oratorios, but only the printed librettos survive (Hill 2001).

== Sources ==
- Hill, John Walter. 2001. "Veracini, Antonio". The New Grove Dictionary of Music and Musicians, second edition, edited by Stanley Sadie and John Tyrrell. London: Macmillan Publishers.
