= La verità in cimento =

1720 opera by Antonio Vivaldi

- Opera by Antonio Vivaldi
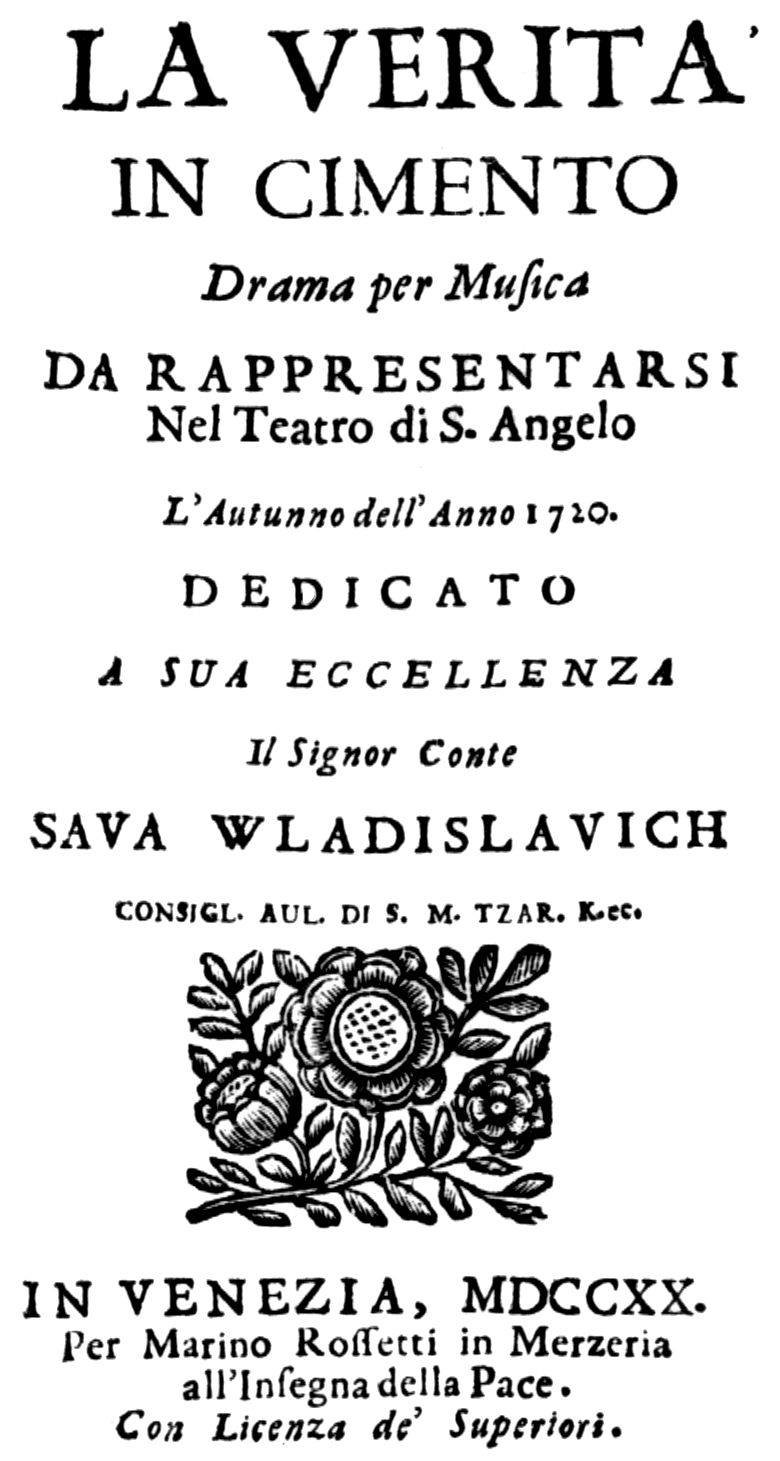
- Libretto title page (1720)
- Librettist: Giovanni Palazzi and Domenico Lalli
- Language: Italian
- Premiere: 26 October 1720; Teatro San Angelo, Venice

La verità in cimento (Italian pronunciation: [la veriˈta in tʃiˈmento]; Truth in Contention) is an opera by Antonio Vivaldi to a libretto by Giovanni Palazzi and Domenico Lalli. The opera, Vivaldi's 13th, was premiered on 26 October 1720 at the Teatro San Angelo in Venice. The work is dedicated to Count Sava Vladislavich, a Serbian merchant and diplomat in the employ of Peter the Great, who resided in Venice from 1716 to 1722. The work is listed as RV 739 in the Vivaldi catalogue.

== Roles ==
Roles, voice types, premiere cast
Role	Voice type	Premiere cast, 26 October 1720
Rosane	soprano	Anna Maria Strada
Rustena	mezzo-soprano	Chiara Orlandi
Melindo	contralto (en travesti)	Antonia Maria Laurenti
Damira	contralto	Antonia Merighi
Zelim	soprano castrato	Girolamo Albertini
Sultan Mamud	tenor	Antonio Barbieri

== Synopsis ==
Mamud had two sons, one by his favourite Damira and one by the Sultana Rustena. He had them exchanged at birth, so that Melindo, in truth the son of Damira, is thought to be the legitimate heir, a position rightfully held by Zelim. When marriage is proposed between Melindo and Rosane, the heiress to another Sultanate (who is in fact beloved by Zelim), Mamud resolves to reveal the true state of affairs. After various twists and turns, Zelim inherits the larger portion of his empire, while Melindo contents himself with a secondary kingdom (Rosane's country) and is allowed to marry the fickle princess Rosane. This leaves everyone satisfied.

== Recording ==
- Ensemble Matheus, conducted by Jean-Christophe Spinosi, Naïve Records (2002)
- Vivaldi: Arie ritrovate (2 arias), Sonia Prina, Accademia Bizantina, Ottavio Dantone. Naïve Records. (2008)
