= Francesco Zoppis =

Italian composer

Francesco Zoppis (Venice, 1715 - after 1781) was an Italian composer.

== Biography ==
Little is known of his artistic beginnings. The first mention of him is from 1739, when the travelling opera company of Pietro Mignotti performed his opera Lucio Papirio ditattore in Graz. In 1745 was Zoppis temporarily engaged as the "vice-kapellmeister" at the court of the kurfürst Clemens August in Bonn. In 1748 he came to Prague, where he joined the Locatelli ensemble. He began to cooperate with e. g. Ch. W. Gluck and G. M. Rutini. Zoppis composed his first Prague opera, Vologeso, in 1753. A year later, in 1754, he introduced another opera - Siroe, re di Persia. The music was written to the libretto of Pietro Metastasio. Zoppis left Prague together with Locatelli and moved to St. Petersburgh, where he conducted the local opera.

== Selected works ==
- Lucio Papirio ditattore - opera, libretto by Apostolo Zeno (1739, Graz)
- Artaserse - libretto by Pietro Metastasio (1748, Bonn)
- Il Vologeso - opera, libretto by Apostolo Zeno (1753, Prague)
- Siroe, re di Persia - opera (1754)
- Endimione - pastoral serenade (1754)
- Il sacrificio d´Abramo - opera (1756)
- Didone abbandonata - libretto by Pietro Metastasio (1758, St. Petersburg)
- La Galatea - libretto by Pietro Metastasio (1760, St. Petersburg)
- Ouverture by Zoppis Veneziano (in Catalogue de J.-P. Masson de Meslay, c. 1790)
