= Giuseppe Maria Buini =

Italian composer, organist, librettist and poet

Giuseppe Maria Buini (Note: His surname also appears in 18th-century sources as "Bovina" or "Buina") (c. 1690 – 13 May 1739) was an Italian composer, organist, librettist and poet. He was a prolific composer of operas, primarily in the opera buffa genre, which were performed in Venice and his native Bologna. Unusually for the period, he also wrote many of the libretti himself. Several of his comic opera libretti were subsequently re-set by other composers. According to Edward Dent, their influence can also be seen in the libretti which Carlo Goldoni later wrote for Baldassare Galuppi. Very little of his music has survived, apart from a book of sonatas for violin and cello and a few individual arias and cantatas.
