= List of operas by Francesco Gasparini =

This is a complete list of operas by Francesco Gasparini (1661–1727).

There are 62 operas listed.

== List ==
Number	Title	Libretto	Genre	Subdivisions	Première date	Place, theatre	Notes
1	Roderico	Giovanni Battista Bottalino	dramma per musica	3 acts		Livorno	dedication 20 December 1686 revised 25 January 1694 Rome, Teatro della Pace
2	Bellerofonte	Giuseppe Maria Conti	dramma per musica	3 acts	carnival 1690	Rome, Collegio Clementino	
3	Amor vince lo sdegno, ovvero L'Olimpia placata	Aurelio Aureli	dramma per musica	3 acts	9 February 1692	Rome, Teatro Capranica	
4	La costanza nell'Amor Divino, ovvero La Santa Rosalia (Act 3 Gasparini, Act 1 De Luca, Act 2 Flavio Carlo Lanciani)	Pietro Ottoboni	dramma per musica	3 acts	1696	Rome, Cancelleria	revised as L'amante del cielo, 13 February 1699 Rome, Collegio Nazareno
5	Totila in Roma	Matteo Noris	dramma per musica	3 acts	1696	Palermo, Teatro Santa Cecilia	
6	Aiace	Pietro d'Averara	dramma per musica	3 acts	November 1697	Naples, Teatro San Bartolomeo	
7	Gerone tiranno di Siracusa	Aurelio Aureli	dramma per musica	3 acts	1700	Genoa, Teatro Falcone	
8	Tiberio imperatore d'Oriente	Giovanni Domenico Pallavicini	dramma per musica	3 acts	carnival 1702	Venice, Teatro San Angelo	revised as Le vicende d'amore e di fortuna, carnival 1709 Venice, San Fantino
9	Gli imenei stabiliti dal caso	Francesco Silvani	dramma per musica	3 acts	carnival 1703	Venice, Teatro San Cassiano	
10	Il più fedel fra i vassalli	Francesco Silvani	dramma per musica	3 acts	carnival 1703	Venice, Teatro San Cassiano	performed as Antioco, 12 December 1711 London, Haymarket
11	Il miglior d'ogni amore per il peggiore d'ogni odio	Francesco Silvani	dramma per musica	3 acts	7 November 1703	Venice, Teatro San Cassiano	
12	La fede tradita e vendicata	Francesco Silvani				Venice, Teatro San Cassiano	dedication 5 January 1704 revised with Giuseppe Vignola (carnival 1707 Naples, San Bartolomeo); revised by Orlandini (August 1712 Bologna, Teatro Marsigli-Rossi); with arias by Orlandini, Giovanni Battista Bononcini and Francesco Mancini as Ermelinda, 26 February 1713 London, Haymarket); revised carnival 1719, Turin, Teatro Carignano
13	La maschera levata al vizio	Francesco Silvani	dramma per musica	3 acts	4 November 1704	Venice, Teatro San Cassiano	
14	Fredegonda	Francesco Silvani	dramma per musica	3 acts		Venice, Teatro San Cassiano	dedication 26 December 1704
15	Il principato custodito dalla frode	Francesco Silvani	dramma per musica	3 acts	2 February 1705	Venice, Teatro San Cassiano	
16	Alarico, ovvero L'ingratitudine castigata (collaboration with Albinoni and others)	Francesco Silvani	dramma per musica	3 acts	1705	Palermo, Teatro Santa Cecilia	
17	Antioco	Apostolo Zeno and Pietro Pariati	dramma per musica	3 acts	November 1705	Venice, Teatro San Cassiano	
18	Ambleto (Hamlet)	Apostolo Zeno and Pietro Pariati	dramma per musica	3 acts	carnival 1705	Venice, Teatro San Cassiano	revised by G. Vignola (4 November 1711 Naples, Teatro San Bartolomeo); revised (London, Haymarket, dedication 22 February 1712
19	Statira	Apostolo Zeno and Pietro Pariati	dramma per musica	3 acts	carnival 1705	Venice, Teatro San Cassiano	revised by G. Vignola as Le regine di Macedonia,1708. Naples, San Bartolomeo
20	Taican re della Cina	Urbano Rizzi	tragedia	5 acts	4 January 1707	Venice, Teatro San Cassiano	
21	Anfitrione	Pietro Pariati? and Apostolo Zeno	tragicomedia	prologue and 5 acts	13 November 1707	Venice, Teatro San Cassiano	
22	L'amor generoso	Apostolo Zeno	dramma per musica	3 acts	1 December 1707	Venice, Teatro San Cassiano	revised by G. de Bottis (Naples, San Giovanni dei Fiorentini, dedication 30 December 1708), revised by San Lapis as La fede in cimento, carnival 1730 Venice, Teatro San Cassiano
23	Flavio Anicio Olibrio	Apostolo Zeno and Pietro Pariati	dramma per musica	3 acts	carnival 1707	Venice, Teatro San Cassiano	revised (carnival 1722 Milan, Regio Ducal); as Ricimero? (carnival 1722 Turin, Teatro Carignano), one aria by C. I. Monza
24	Engelberta (Acts 4 & 5 by Gasparini, Acts 1 & 3 by Albinoni)	Apostolo Zeno and Pietro Pariati	dramma per musica	5 acts	carnival 1708	Venice, Teatro San Cassiano	performed with intermezzo La capricciosa e il credulo
25	Alciade, ovvero L'eroico amore (La violenza d'amore) (Act 1 Gasparini, Act 2 Pollarolo, Act 3 Francesco Ballarotti)		opera tragicomica	3 acts	1709	Bergamo	as L'amante impazzito, Autumn 1714 Venice, San Fantino
26	Atenaide (Act 3 Gasparini, Act 1 Andrea Stefano Fiorè, Act 2 Caldara)	Apostolo Zeno	dramma per musica	3 acts	1709	Milan, Teatro Regio Ducale	as Teodosio ed Eudossia (Grimani) (Autumn 1716, Wolfenbüttel) Collaboration with Fux and Caldara; as Teodosio, Hamburg, dedication 14 November 1718
27	La principessa fedele	Agostin Piovene	dramma per musica	3 acts	10 November 1709	Venice, Teatro San Cassiano)	performed with intermezzo Zamberlucco; performed as Cunegonda? carnival 1718, Mantua, Arciducale
28	Sesostri re d'Egitto	Pietro Pariati	dramma per musica	3 acts	carnival 1709	Venice, Teatro San Cassiano	performed with intermezzi Il nuovo mondo and Tulpiano
29	La ninfa Apollo (with Lotti)	Francesco de Lemene	scherzo scenico pastorale		carnival 1709	Venice, Teatro San Cassiano	
30	L'amor tirannico	Domenico Lalli	dramma per musica	5 acts	Autumn 1710	Venice, Teatro San Cassiano	
31	Tamerlano	Agostin Piovene	tragedia		24 January 1711	Venice, Teatro San Cassiano	revised as Il Bajazet, 1719 Reggio Emilia, Pubblico, revised as Bajazette, 1723 Venice, Teatro San Samuele, Ascension Fair 1723
32	Costantino	Apostolo Zeno, Pietro Pariati	dramma per musica	5 acts	8 November 1711	Venice, Teatro San Cassiano	
33	Metrope	Apostolo Zeno	dramma per musica	3 acts	carnival 1711	Venice, Teatro San Cassiano	
34	Eraclio (Act 2 Gasparini, Act 1 anon., Act 3 Pollarolo)	Pietro Antonio Bernadoni	dramma per musica	3 acts	1712	Rome, Cancelleria	
35	Il commando non inteso ed ubbidito	Francesco Silvani	dramma per musica	3 acts	carnival 1713	Milan, Teatro Regio Ducale	performed as Zoe, ovvero Il commando non inteso ed ubbidito, carnival 1721 Rome, Pace
36	La verità nell'inganno	Francesco Silvani	dramma per musica	3 acts	carnival 1713	Venice, Teatro San Cassiano	
37	L'amore politico e generoso della regina Ermengarda (with Giovanni Maria Capelli)		dramma per musica	3 acts	Spring 1713	Mantua	
38	Lucio Papirio	Antonio Salvi	dramma per musica	3 acts	carnival 1714	Rome, Capranica	Intermezzo Barilotto e Serpina
39	Eumene	Apostolo Zeno	dramma per musica	3 acts	1714	Reggio Emilia, Teatro Pubblico	revised 1 October 1715 Naples, Reggio Palazzo, with 17 arias by Leo and others; performed with intermezzi Mirena and L'alfier fanfarone
40	Amor vince l'odio, ovvero Timocrate	Antonio Salvi	dramma per musica	3 acts	11 February 1715	Florence, Teatro del Cocomero	
41	Il tartaro nella Cina	Antonio Salvi	dramma per musica	3 acts	1715	Reggio Emilia, Teatro Pubblico	
42	Ciro	Matteo Noris	dramma per musica	3 acts	carnival 1716	Rome, Capranica	
43	Vincislao	Apostolo Zeno	dramma per musica	3 acts	carnival 1716	Rome, Capranica	adaptation of Francesco Mancini setting, 26 December 1714, Naples, San Bartolomeo
44	Il gran Cid	Jacopo Alberghetti	dramma per musica	3 acts	carnival 1717	Naples, San Bartolomeo	
45	Intermezzi in derisione della setta maomettana	Girolamo Gigli			carnival 1717	Rome, Seminario Romano	
46	Pirro	Apostolo Zeno	dramma per musica	3 acts	carnival 1717	Rome, Capranica	
47	Il trace in catena (collaboration with two students)	Antonio Salvi	dramma per musica	3 acts	carnival 1717	Rome, Capranica	
48	Democrito		dramma per musica	3 acts	carnival 1718	Turin, Carignano	
49	Nana francese e Armena (Mirena e Floro)		intermezzo		February 1718	Dresden	
50	Astianatte	Antonio Salvi	dramma per musica	3 acts	carnival 1719	Rome, Teatro Alibert	revised, carnival 1722 Milan, Teatro Regio Ducale
51	Lucio Vero	Apostolo Zeno	dramma per musica	3 acts	carnival 1719	Rome, Teatro Alibert	
52	Tigrane re d'Armenia (with F B Conti, Orlandini and Vivaldi)		dramma per musica	3 acts	1719	Hamburg	
53	L'oracolo del fato	Pietro Pariati	componimento per musica		1 October 1719	Vienna, Hoftheater	
54	Amore e maestà	Antonio Salvi	dramma per musica	3 acts	carnival 1720	Rome, Teatro Alibert	
55	Faramondo	after Apostolo Zeno	dramma per musica	3 acts	carnival 1720	Rome, Teatro Alibert	
56	La pace fra Seleuco e Tolomeo	Adriano Morselli, revised by Andrea Trabucco	dramma per musica	3 acts	carnival 1720	Milan, Teatro Regio Ducale	
57	Il Vecchio Avaro	Antonio Salvi	intermezzo		1720	Florence?	
58	Nino (Act 2 Gasparini, Act 1 Capelli, Act 3 A M Bononcini)	Ippolito Zanelli	dramma per musica	3 acts	1720	Reggio Emilia, Teatro Pubblico	
59	Dorinda	Benedetto Marcello?	favola pastorale		carnival 1723	Rome	
60	Silvia	Enrico Bissari	dramma pastorale		carnival 1723	Foligno	
61	Gli equivoci d'amore e d'innocenza	Antonio Salvi	dramma per musica	3 acts	Autumn 1723	Venice, San Giovanni Grisostomo	
62	Tigrena		favola pastorale, with intermezzos		2 January 1724	Rome, Palazzo De Mello de Castro	
