= Il convitato di pietra (Righini) =

1776 opera by Vincenzo Righini

Il convitato di pietra is an opera of 1776 performed in Prague, the second of a series of three notable operas based on the Don Juan legend that were performed there for the first time in the 18th century (the others being the pastiche La pravità castigata of 1730 and Wolfgang Amadeus Mozart's Don Giovanni of 1787). The full title of the opera, Il convitato di pietra, ossia il dissoluto, can be translated as "the stone guest, or the debauchee". The title is derived from the prototype Italian Don Juan spoken drama, Giacinto Andrea Cicognini's Il convitato di pietra of ca. 1632, which is based on Tirso de Molina's drama El burlador de Sevilla y convidado de piedra ("the trickster of Seville and the stone guest") of ca. 1620. The libretto for the 1776 opera was written by Nunziato Porta with music by Vincenzo Righini. Porta chose the designation "dramma tragicomico" for the work to draw attention to a mix of serious and comic action. The most important literary model that Porta's libretto makes reference to is Carlo Goldoni's play Don Giovanni Tenorio of 1736, but its libretto was also prepared with at least some reference to La pravità castigata of 1730. It appears to have initiated a series of new Don Juan operas that appeared in Europe between 1777 and 1787.

== Composition and performance history ==
The circumstances of the first performance of Righini's opera have been detailed most fully by Daniel E. Freeman. In fact, very little about its genesis is known for certain, unlike its predecessor La pravità castigata of 1730, which was performed in the opera theater of Count Franz Anton von Sporck. Nunziato Porta and Vincenzo Righini were both young theatrical personnel who were attached to the theatrical company of Giuseppe Bustelli that performed at the time in the theater known as the Divadlo v Kotcích, or "theater in the stalls", so named for its location in a market district in the Old City of Prague, which had been in operation as the principal venue for operatic performances in Prague since the late 1730s as a replacement for the Sporck theater, which operated between 1724 and 1735. They first collaborated on the opera La vedova scaltra in Prague in 1774 (in both cases, the first operas that either of them had worked on), then for La bottega del caffè in 1775. The librettos for both of these operas were based on comic plays by Carlo Goldoni. In fact, eight comic plays by Goldoni were performed in Prague by the theatrical company of Johann Joseph Brunian in German translation during the theatrical season of 1771-72, a spur for operatic adaptations several years later. Goldoni's Don Giovanni Tenorio was not among the plays performed, but the best guess about Bustelli's decision to put on a performance of an opera based on Don Giovanni Tenorio is a continuation of the interest in Goldoni in Prague initiated by Brunian. The librettist Porta certainly knew the text for Denzio's La pravità castigata, since it is clear that he borrowed ideas from it, but as far as choosing the subject matter, it is not known whether it was due to the precedent of an earlier Don Juan opera in Prague or the vogue for Goldoni's plays at the time. Of course, it could have been inspired by both.

== Notes on the music and libretto ==
The complete Righini score is still preserved in the National Széchényi Library in Budapest, whereas the complete libretto is available in modern transcription and printed and online facsmiles. Neither the libretto from the original Prague performance of 1776 nor its revival in Prague in 1777 contain any indication of the singers who appeared, nor any indication of what date or season of the year the performances took place. Excerpts from the original score have also been transcribed.

The basis of 18th-century operas based on the Don Juan legend is a scenario in which the famous Spanish seducer is never brought to justice for his disgraceful personal behavior until he murders the father of a young woman whose honor he tries to protect. The father is a military officer (the Commander). The Commander is laid to rest, but he returns as an apparition to avenge his murder. At a supper with Don Juan, the Commander demands that Don Juan repent of his sins or face instant eternal damnation. Don Juan refuses to repent and is immediately dragged down to hell by demonic creatures. The play of Goldoni is a "rationalist" version of the story that does not include a spectacular supernatural depiction of Don Juan's consignment to hell. Rather, Don Juan simply collapses on the ground.

Nunziato Porta carefully adopted most of Goldoni's character names for his libretto: Don Giovanni Tenorio, "a Neapolitan knight", for Don Juan; Don Alfonso for a Castilian minister of state; Donna Anna for the Commander's daughter; Donna Isabella for one of Don Juan's abandoned lovers; Duca Ottavio for Donna Anna's betrothed (who is only referred to without actually appearing in Porta's libretto); and Elisa for the minor character of a fisherwoman. Porta also used Goldoni's means of identifying the Commander as the Castilian "Commander of Lojoa". Generally, character names varied widely among Don Juan dramatizations of the 17th and 18th centuries, whether they included music or not, so the use of so many of Goldoni's name is a clear confirmation of Porta's familiarity with Goldoni's play. The opening scene of Porta's libretto including the fisherwoman Elisa is the part most clearly based on Antonio Denzio's La pravità castigata. The presence of comic action in an opera of the 1770s mandates a contemporary setting (rather than a setting in the distant past, as in serious opera), but Porta gives no indication of where the action is supposed to take place (Goldoni specifies Castile, Spain). The main comic dialogue is given to Elisa, Don Juan's servant Arlechino, and various other types of servants. In general, serious dialogue would be reserved for upper-class characters in operas of the era. The mixing of serious and comic action was a defining characteristic of Don Juan entertainments of any type in the 18th century.

The music by the young Vincenzo Righini (1756–1812), among his first operas in a long career, is rather unremarkable, and at times simplistic and repetitive. After the appearance of La pravità castigata in Prague in 1730, the most significant new musical work based on the Don Juan legend until the appearance of Righini's opera was the ballet Don Juan of the Bohemian composer Christoph Willibald von Gluck, which was first performed in Vienna in 1761. There is good reason to believe that Righini was aware of Gluck's score. Daniel E. Freeman has noted that the scene in which Don Juan's torment is depicted appears to re-interpret the last dance number of the Gluck ballet (no. 31), which is the most memorable part of the work. The finale of act 2, an early example of the concept of the "buffo" finale later developed to a very high degree of sophistication in the work of Mozart, does contain interesting techniques of creating terror and surprise for the scene in which the Commander appears at Don Juan's house and interesting evocations of sacred style to evoke the semi-divine character of the resurrected Commander. Righini respected the common convention of the time to compose relatively sophisticated music for upper-class characters and much simpler music for lower-class characters.

== Legacy ==
The first performance of Righini's Il convitato di pietra in Prague in 1776 (and revived in Prague in 1777) was the first new operatic setting of a Don Juan opera in Europe since Denzio's libretto for La pravità castigata was re-set by Eustachio Bambini for Brno in 1734, and it was soon followed by a number of operatic productions based on the Don Juan legend up to 1787. The revival of Righini's opera in Vienna in 1777 must have occurred due to the precedent set in Prague, and the production at Eszterháza in 1781 was mounted due to the presence of Nunziato Porta at the time in the musical establishment of Joseph Haydn. The production of Giuseppe Calegari's Il convitato di pietra in Venice during the carnival season of 1777 was likely the result of the close operatic connections between Prague and Venice maintained throughout the 18th century. Later, there was a performance of Giacomo Tritto's Il convitato di pietra in Naples in 1783 (revived in Palermo in 1784) and Gioacchino Albertini's Don Giovanni performed in Warsaw in 1783 and perhaps elsewhere. Three new Don Juan operas appeared in 1787: Vincenzo Fabrizi's Il convitato di pietra in Rome, Giuseppe Gazzaniga's Don Giovanni Tenorio in Venice, and Mozart's Don Giovanni in Prague. In Italy, the Gazzaniga Don Giovanni Tenorio became so popular that new settings were inhibited for the remainder of the 18th century. The text of Giovanni Bertati was the most important model for the libretto by Lorenzo Da Ponte set by Mozart.

Daniel E. Freeman points out that the impresario of the National Theater in Prague (now known as the Estates Theatre) was Domenico Guardasoni, who was a resident of Prague in 1776 and 1777 when the Righini Il convitato di pietra was first performed. It is possible that Guardasoni pressed for the Don Juan subject matter from Mozart in 1787 thinking of the potential for an exceptional musical setting of a remarkable historical tale that had been treated successfully in Prague before. Regardless, Righini's Il convitato di pietra is one of the two key operatic predecessors in Prague that led to the production of Mozart's Don Giovanni. There were no 18th-century operatic settings of the Don Juan legend before Antonio Denzio's La pravità castigata – and no operatic settings at all of the Don Juan legend set in modern times using the original Spanish characters of Tirso de Molina's prototype dramatization. The modern concept of a "Don Juan opera" originated in Prague with its three 18th-century settings.

== Act 1 ==
At the start, the fisherwoman Elisa and her friend Carino rescue Don Giovanni and his servant Arlechino from drowning by the seashore. In his usual manner of trying to tempt lower-class women with irresistible promises of marriages, he succeeds in seducing Elisa. Elsewhere, the Castilian noble Don Alfonso and Donna Anna greet her father, the Commendatore, who is to be honored with the erection of an equestrian statue in his honor. Donna Anna is to be married to Duca Ottavio (who never appears). Elisa learns that Don Giovanni intends to abandon her, but believes in his promise of marriage regardless. In the street in front of the Commendatore's house, Don Giovanni brags to his servant Arlechino that he will try to seduce Donna Anna, regardless of the consequences. He does approach Donna Anna, but she resists him and calls for help. The Commendatore comes to her aid, duels with Don Giovanni, and is killed.

== Act 2 ==
Don Giovanni regrets what he has done and realizes that he will have to flee in order to avoid punishment. In an aside, Don Alfonso assures Donna Isabella, one of Don Giovanni's abandoned lovers, that he will be brought to justice. Don Giovanni hides in the cemetery in which the Commendatore is interred. Donna Anna appears to lament the memory of her father, and Don Giovanni attempts to seduce her again, also unsuccessfully. Arlechino arrives to tell Don Giovanni that arrangements for his departure are ready, but Don Giovanni does not want to leave. He says he asked the statue of the Commendatore in the cemetery to supper and the statue nodded its assent. A banquet is prepared at a local inn with a group of guests. The mood is convivial until the Commendatore arrives. In horror, the guests leave. The Commendatore asks Don Giovanni to return the courtesy and take supper with him. After the Commendatore leaves, the guests return, and the festivities return.

== Act 3 ==
In a "remote location", Don Giovanni and Arlechino have supper with the Commendatore, who serves them a grotesque selection of toads, snakes, and hemlock. The Commendatore asks Don Giovanni to repent of his sins several times, but he refuses and is condemned to the abyss. Arlechino flees in terror and soon informs Don Alfonso and Donna Anna of Don Giovanni's demise. In the final scene, Don Giovanni is shown being tormented by "furies".

== External Link ==
- libretto of Righini's Il convitato di pietra
