= Il convitato di pietra =

Il convitato di pietra may refer to various versions of the stone guest and Don Juan story.

- Il convitato di pietra, 1657 play in Naples based on Tirso de Molina's El burlador de Sevilla published 1630
- Il convitato di pietra, an opera by Vincenzo Righini set to a libretto by Nunziato Porta, Prague 1776
- Il convitato di pietra, opera semiseria by Giacomo Tritto set to a libretto by Giovanni Battista Lorenzi, 1783
- Don Giovanni, o sia Il convitato di pietra, Don Giovanni Tenorio, opera by Giuseppe Gazzaniga, 1787
- Il convitato di pietra, an opera by Vincenzo Fabrizi reusing the libretto by Giovanni Battista Lorenzi, 1787
- Il convitato di pietra, farsa by Giovanni Pacini set to a libretto attributed to Gaetano Barbieri, 1832

== See also ==
- The Stone Guest (disambiguation)
