= Antonio Denzio =

Italian impresario, opera singer, and librettist

Antonio Denzio (23 September 1689 – 1763 or after) was an Italian impresario, tenor, and librettist. Born in Venice to a family of musicians and operatic personnel, he began his career as an opera singer, with documented roles from 1715 to 1748. In 1724, he traveled to Bohemia with the Italian opera company of Antonio Maria Peruzzi and soon succeeded Peruzzi as impresario. From 1724 to 1735, Denzio directed opera productions at the Prague palace of Count Franz Anton von Sporck, which housed the city's first standing opera theater. His company attracted prominent Italian singers, and he worked with Antonio Vivaldi, who supplied music and later visited Prague.

Denzio also sang in his company's productions and wrote several full-length librettos. The most significant was La pravità castigata (1730), the earliest opera based on the Don Juan tale to use its original setting and characters. As the popularity of his Prague productions declined, his finances deteriorated; the company eventually went bankrupt, and Denzio spent time in debtors' prison. He returned briefly to Venice in 1735 and later made unsuccessful attempts to establish opera companies elsewhere in Europe, including Brussels, Augsburg, and Lübeck, while continuing to perform as a singer. The last known record of him is a newspaper announcement published in Moscow in 1763.

== Biography ==
Born in Venice to a family of musicians and operatic personnel, he pursued a career mainly as a singer until 1724, when he traveled to Bohemia as a member of the opera company of Antonio Maria Peruzzi, probably his uncle. (Note: Information about Denzio's family background in Venice is collected most succinctly in Jonášová (2008). Another remarkable member of the family was Elisabetta Denzio, likely Antonio's sister, who appeared in operatic roles in Venice, Ferrara, and Modena in the years 1713-16, as documented in Corago Singers Project Elisabetta Denzio. Included were roles in Vivaldi's operas Orlando finto pazzo (1715) and Nerone fatto Cesare (1716) at the Teatro Sant’Angelo in Venice. What appears to have been the start of a distinguished singing career was cut short by poisoning at the hands of the family of a Venetian nobleman who did not wish to see her marry into it, as explained in Freeman (1992), p. 26. Her grisly death was reported in the Venetian press, as described in Eleanor Selfridge-Field, Pallade Veneta: Writings on Music in Venetian Society, 1650-1750, Venice 1985, pp. 360-2. Antonio's daughter Marina is recorded as a singer in roles performed in Prague and Regensburg in 1733 and 1734, as documented in Corago Singers Project Marina Denzi.) Peruzzi had the idea of bringing an Italian opera company to Central Europe to perform first in Prague, then Dresden and Leipzig. If this plan had succeeded, it undoubtedly would have brought Peruzzi, Denzio, their Italian singing personnel, and their repertory of operas into contact with Johann Sebastian Bach in Leipzig, either directly or indirectly.

The company was first brought to Bohemia under the patronage of Count Franz Anton von Sporck, who had it play at his palace at Kuks in northwest Bohemia in the summer of 1724. The performances were so successful that he permitted the company to perform free of charge in his palace in Prague. After disagreements with Peruzzi, Denzio was able to supplant him as impresario before the end of the year 1724 and continued productions in the Sporck palace until 1735. Peruzzi left with some of the Peruzzi-Denzio players to found the Breslau Opera. Denzio's opera theater at Sporck's palace was the first standing opera theater in the city. His productions were popular with the Bohemian nobility until about 1729, after which Denzio's finances deteriorated. Count Sporck provided no financial assistance to the company except the free use of his theater, and he allowed it to fail. The company went bankrupt and Denzio was forced to spend time in debtors' prison.

During its heyday, Denzio was able to attract at least one of the principal singing stars in Italy to Prague each season. The most prominent of all was Margherita Gualandi, who was forced to come to Prague after being blackballed in Italy for bad behavior. Gualandi also created scandal in Prague after being sued by the composer Matteo Lucchini for failing to pay for a series of arias she commissioned from him for her private use. Gualandi was a part of the circle of operatic musicians surrounding Vivaldi and appeared along with Denzio's sister Elisabetta in Venice in Vivaldi's operas Orlando finto pazzo (1714) and Nerone fatto Cesare (1715). Another distinguished member of this circle, Maria Caterina Negri, also created scandal in Prague concerning refusal to appear in roles and was actually threatened with arrest for this transgression. Denzio, who himself appeared in one of Vivaldi's early Venetian operas, La costanza trionfante degl'amori e de gl'odii of 1716, became a rather close professional collaborator with the composer due to his activities in Prague. One of the most important reasons that Denzio was able to attract such fine singers to Prague was the assistance of Vivaldi, who also helped to provided repertory for the Denzio productions. In the early 1730s, Vivaldi came himself to Prague. Some of the music for one of his operas composed for Prague, Argippo, has only recently been re-discovered.

Isolated as he was from his operatic base of Venice, Denzio was forced to become a theatrical jack-of-all-trades. He sang himself in the company's productions and also served as its poet. He wrote several full-length librettos, the most significant of which was La pravità castigata (1730), the earliest opera based on the Don Juan tale to use the original setting and characters. Denzio also undertook the preparation of a rather extraordinary type of operatic pasticcio in which the arias of a single opera, Vivaldi's La costanza trionfante degl'amori e de gl'odii of 1716, were simply re-arranged to match the dramatic context of a new libretto with a completely different story line and setting as La tirannia castigata, performed in the Sporck theater in 1726.

After returning briefly to Venice in 1735, Denzio tried again to mount opera companies in Northern Europe, including in Brussels, Augsburg, and Lübeck, but all of these ventures were unsuccessful. In 1755, he was appointed court poet to the Empress Elizabeth of Russia. He left the Russian imperial service in 1758 or 1759. The last record of him comes from a newspaper announcement published in Moscow in 1763.

== Operatic roles ==
This list is cited to the Corago Project which is published and maintained by the Dipartimento di Beni Culturali (English: Department of Cultural Heritage) at the University of Bologna.

- Laomedonte in Laomedonte by Lorenzo Baseggio (Venice, 1715)
- Rodoaldo in La fede tradita e vendicata by Francesco Gasparini (Venice, 1715)
- Artabano in La costanza trionfante degl'amori e de gl'odii by Antonio Vivaldi (Venice, 1716)
- Leonato in La costanza combattuta in amore by Giovanni Porta (Venice, 1716)
- Gerardo in L'innocenza riconosciuto by Carlo Francesco Pollarolo (Venice, 1717)
- Ormonte in the anonymous Il vinto trionfante del vincitore (Venice, 1717)
- Eudemo in Il tradimento tradito by Tomaso Albinoni (Ferrara, 1718)
- Marziano in Alessandro Severo by Fortunato Chelleri (Brescia, 1719)
- Frilevo in the anonymous L'amor generoso (Brescia, 1719)
- Coridone in Paride by Giuseppe Maria Orlandini (Venice, 1720)
- Venceslao in Venceslao by Giuseppe Boniventi (Turin, 1720)
- Ormindo in Antigone by Giuseppe Maria Orlandini (Venice, 1720)
- Linco in Il pastor fido by Carlo Luigi Pietragrua (Venice, 1721)
- Lotario in L'innocenza difesa by Andrea Stefano Fiorè (Turin, 1722)
- Arbace in Semiramide by Giuseppe Maria Orlandini (Turin, 1722)
- Fedele in Il Ricimero by Francesco Gasparini (Turin, 1722)
- Lotario in L'innocenza giustificata by Andrea Stefano Fiorè (Bergamo, 1723)
- Lotario in L'innocenza giustificata by Andrea Stefano Fiorè (Crema, 1723)
- Orlando in Orlando furioso by Antonio Bioni (Kuks, 1724)
- Orlando in Orlando furioso by Antonio Bioni (Prague, 1724)
- Vologeso in Lucio Vero by Tomaso Albinoni (Prague, 1725)
- Lotario in the pasticcio L'innocenza giustificata (Prague, 1725)
- Aldimiro in the anonymous La fortunata sventura (Prague, 1725)
- Rambaldo in Armida abbandonata by Antonio Bioni (Prague, 1725)
- Venceslao in Venceslao by Giuseppe Boniventi (Prague, 1725)
- Nerone in La tirannia castigata by Antonio Vivaldi (Prague, 1726)
- Amulio in La reità fortunata by Giovanni Antonio Guerra (Prague, 1726)
- Nesso in the anonymous Il contrasto di due, gaudio è del terzo (Prague, 1726)
- Arrenione in Arrenione by Giovanni Maria Ruggieri (Prague, 1726)
- Tullo Ostilio in the anonymous Tullo Ostilio (Prague, 1727)
- Caligula in the anonymous Il confronto dell'amor coniugale (Prague, 1727)
- Licomede in the anonymous Achille in Sciro (Prague, 1727)
- Farasmane in L'amor tirannico by Francesco Feo (Prague, 1727)
- Rodoaldo in La fede tradita e vendicata by Francesco Gasparini (Prague, 1727)
- Artaserse in the anonymous Il tradimento traditor di se stesso (Prague, 1727)
- Argante in Armida al campo by Giovanni Antonio Guerra (Prague, 1728)
- Porsenna in Porsenna by Antonio Lotti (Prague, 1728)
- Baiazetto in La caduta di Baiazetto imperadore de turchi by Matteo Lucchini (Prague, 1728)
- Niceforo in Irene Augusta by Antonio Lotti (Prague, 1728)
- Fenicio in Astarto by Tomaso Albinoni (Prague, 1728)
- Perdica in La costanza combattuta in amore by Giovanni Porta (Prague, 1728)
- Siface in Siface by Nicola Porpora (Prague, 1729)
- Silvano in Amore trionfane by Matteo Lucchini (Prague, 1729)
- Sansone in the anonymous Sansone (Prague, 1729)
- Publio Cornelio Scipione in Publio Cornelio Scipione by Carlo Francesco Pollarolo (Prague, 1729)
- Roderico in the anonymous Roderico (Prague, 1729)
- Pallamede in Aristeo by Antonio Pollarolo (Prague, 1729)
- Peneo in the anonymous Gli amori delusi (Prague, 1730)
- Orlando in the pasticcio Il ritorno del figlio con l'abito più approvato (Prague, 1730)
- Don Alvaro in La pravità castigata by Antonio Caldara (Prague, 1730)
- Farnace in Farnace by Antonio Vivaldi (Prague, 1730)
- Tisifaro in Argippo by Antonio Vivaldi (Prague, 1730)
- Ulissa in the anonymous Penelope la casta (Prague, 1730)
- Tiridate in the anonymous La verità nell'inganno (Prague, 1730)
- Vulcano in Adone by Antonio Bioni (Prague, 1731)
- Ernando in Alvilda regina de' Goti by Antonio Vivaldi (Prague, 1731)
- Jarba in Didone by Tomaso Albinoni (Prague, 1731)
- Danao in Ipermestra by Antonio Costantini (Prague, 1731)
- Polifonte in Merope by Tomaso Albinoni (Prague, 1731)
- Artabano in Doriclea by Antonio Vivaldi (Prague, 1732)
- Lotario in Gli amori amari by Antonio Costantini (Prague, 1732)
- Elmiro in Dorilla in Tempe by Antonio Vivaldi (Prague, 1732)
- Eudemo in the anonymous Il tradimento tradito (Prague, 1732)
- Ircano in the anonymous Sidonio (Prague, 1732)
- Egidio in the anonymous La bilance infallibile (Prague, 1733)
- Tolomeo in the anonymous Il più fedel fra vassalli (Prague, 1733)
- Cileno in the anonymous Filindo (Regensburg, 1733)
- Tribolone in the anonymous Ermelinda (Prague, 1734)
- Tambarano in the anonymous Santa Maria Egizziaca (Prague, 1734)
- Troncone in Teuzzone by Giovanni Maria Orlandini (Prague, 1734)
- Stirado in the anonymous Praga nascente da Libussa e Primislao (Prague, 1734)
- Mitridate in Ciro riconosciuto by Baldassare Galuppi (Venice, 1737)
- Sebaste in Artaserse Longimano by Antonio Pampani (Venice, 1737)
- Orlando in Orlando furioso by Antonio Vivaldi (Bergamo, 1738)
- Artabano in Artaserse by Johann Adolf Hasse (Bergamo, 1738)
- Orlando in Orlando furioso by Antonio Vivaldi (Vicenza, 1738)
- Artabano in Artaserse by Johann Adolf Hasse (Vicenza, 1738)
- Rambaldo in the anonymous Armida abandonata (Bergamo, 1740)
- Baiazetto in La caduta di Baiazetto by Matteo Lucchini (Bergamo, 1740)
- Arrenione in Arrenione by Giovanni Maria Ruggieri (Bergamo, 1740)
- Tiridate in La verità nell'inganno by Giovanni Chinzer (Munich, 1747)
- Pantalone in the anonymous L'industria galante (Munich, 1748)

== Bibliography ==
- Freeman, Daniel E. (1992). The Opera Theater of Count Franz Anton von Sporck in Prague. Stuyvesant, New York: Pendragon Press.
- Jonášová, Milada (2008). "I Denzio: tre generazioni di musicisti a Venezia e a Praga". Hudební věda (45): 57–114.
- Talbot, Michael (2002). "Denzio [Denzi], Antonio". Grove Music Online. Oxford University Press. doi:10.1093/gmo/9781561592630.article.O901236.
