= Don Juan (ballet) =

Ballet by Christoph Willibald von Gluck

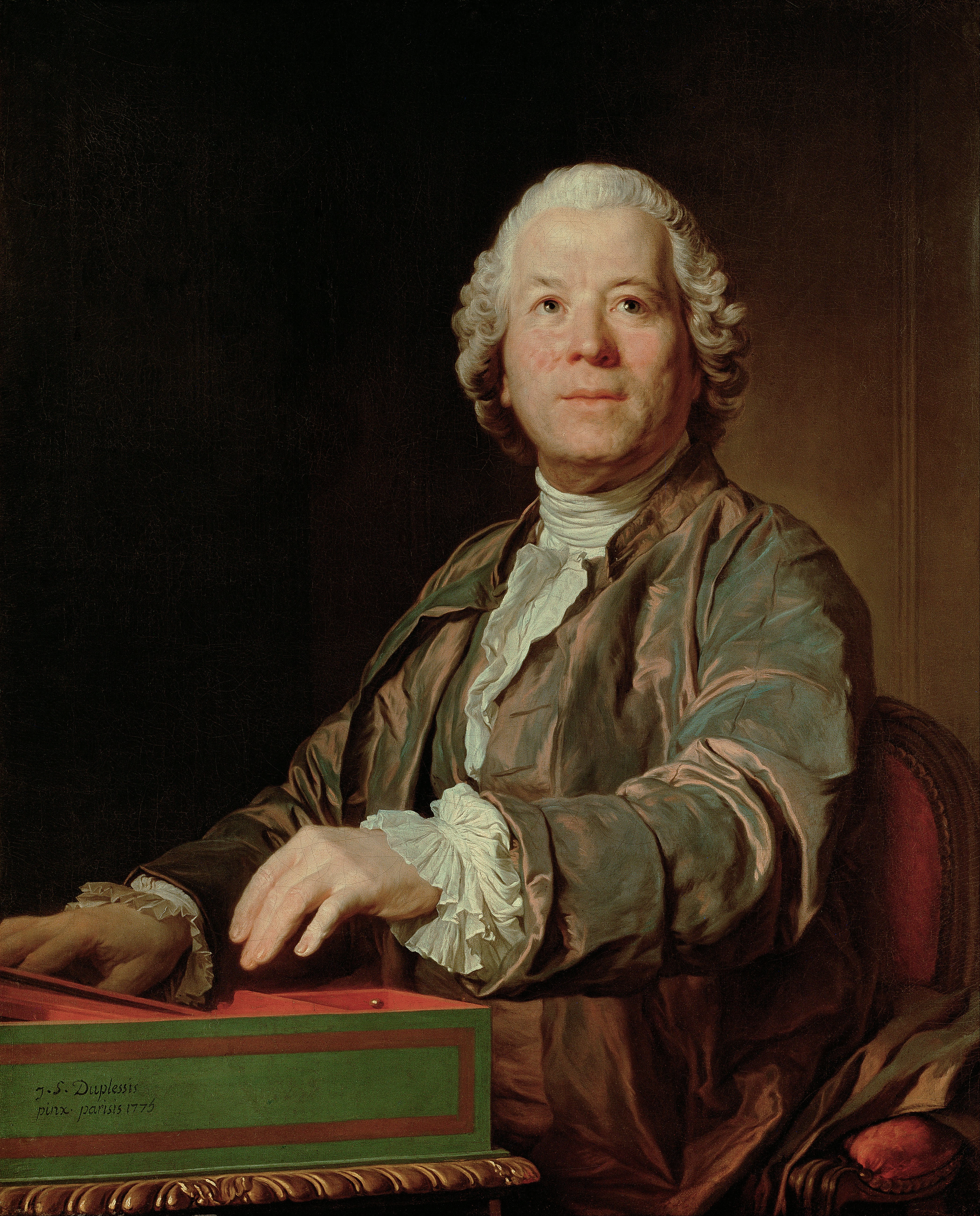
Portrait of Christoph Willibald Gluck by Joseph Duplessis (1775)

Don Juan ou Le Festin de Pierre (Don Juan, or the Stone Guest's Banquet) is a ballet with a libretto by Ranieri de' Calzabigi, music by Christoph Willibald von Gluck, and choreography by Gasparo Angiolini. The ballet's first performance was in Vienna, Austria on Saturday, 17 October 1761, at the Theater am Kärntnertor. Its innovation in the history of ballet, coming a year before Gluck's radical reform of opera seria with his Orfeo ed Euridice (1762), was its coherent narrative element, though the series of conventional divertissement dances in the second act lies within the well-established ballet tradition of an entr'acte effecting a pause in the story-telling. The ballet follows the legend of Don Juan and his descent into Hell after killing his inamorata's father in a duel. It was frequently revived in many parts of Europe after its first performance.

== Background ==
The ballet Don Juan was based on Molière's Dom Juan ou le Festin de pierre of 1665..

The music was known to Vincenzo Righini, who borrowed some of its ideas in his opera Il convitato di pietra, first performed in Prague in 1776 as the second of the three notable operas originating in Prague that were based on the Don Juan legend (the most famous being Don Giovanni of 1787 by Wolfgang Amadeus Mozart).

The 19th movement, marked "Moderato," was used by Mozart in the third act finale of his opera Le nozze di Figaro.
