= Bajazet (Gasparini opera) =

Opera by Francesco Gasparini

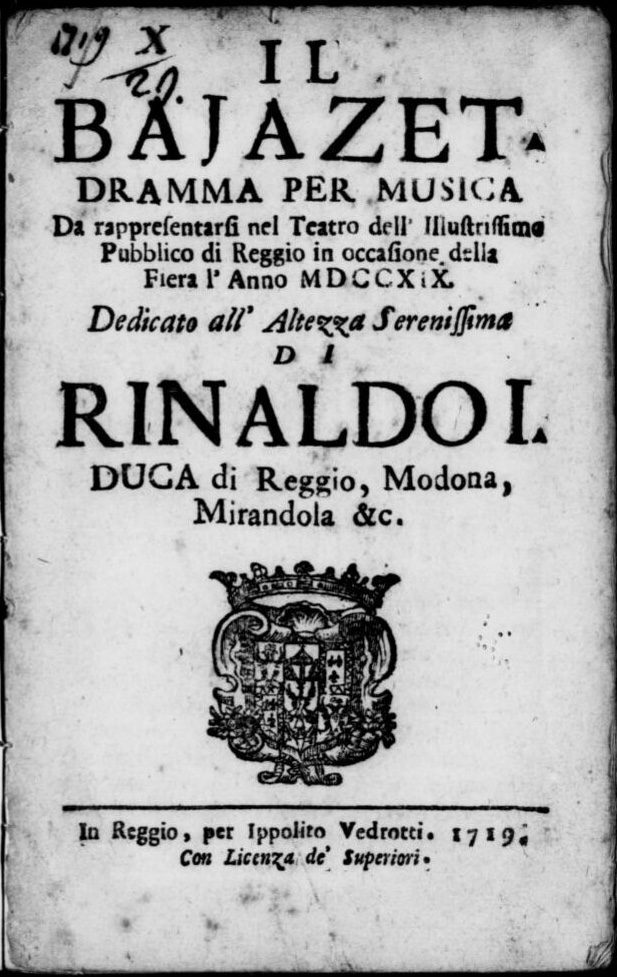
Title page of the libretto for Gasparini’s Bajazet

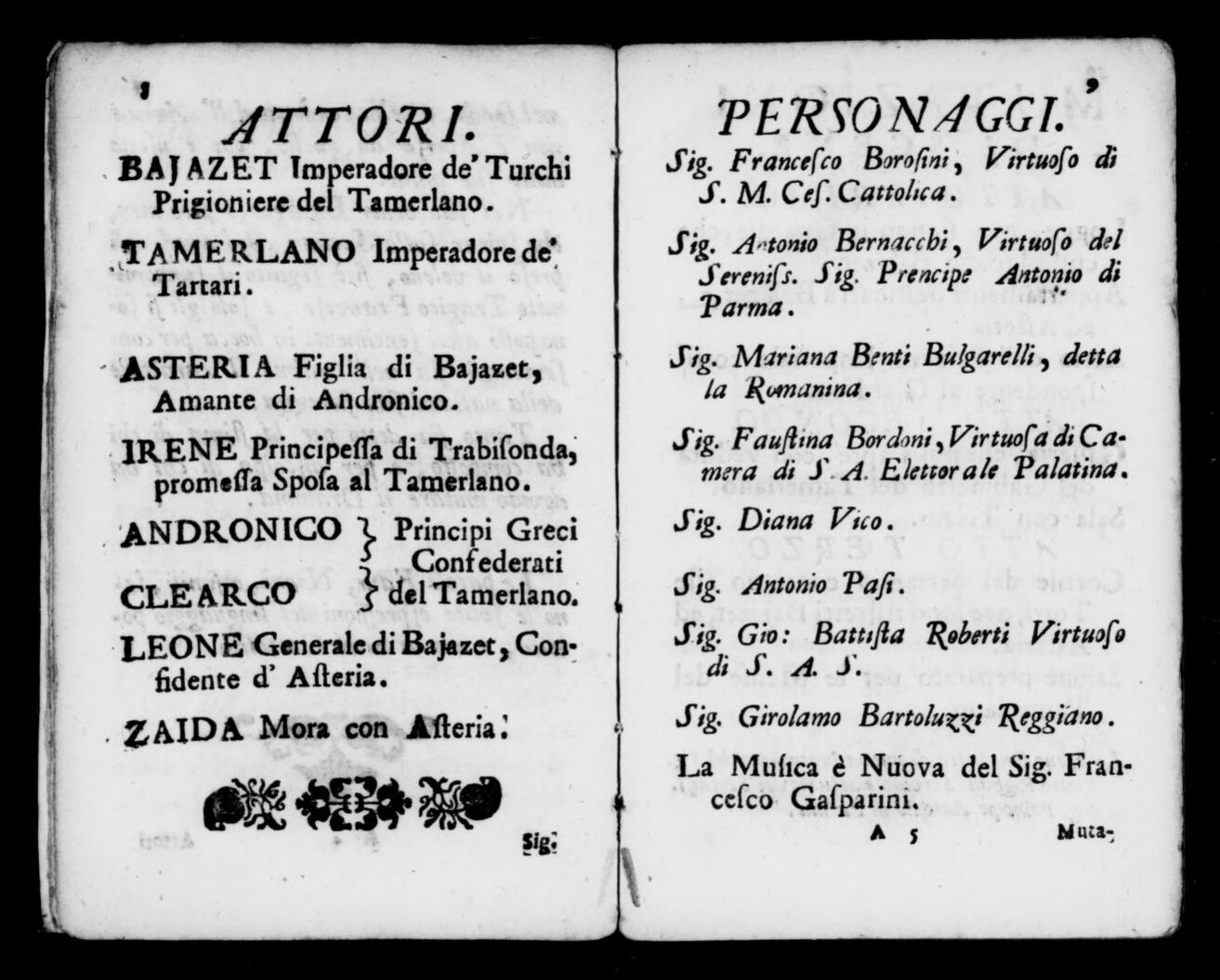
List of roles for the first performance of Gasparini’s Bajazet

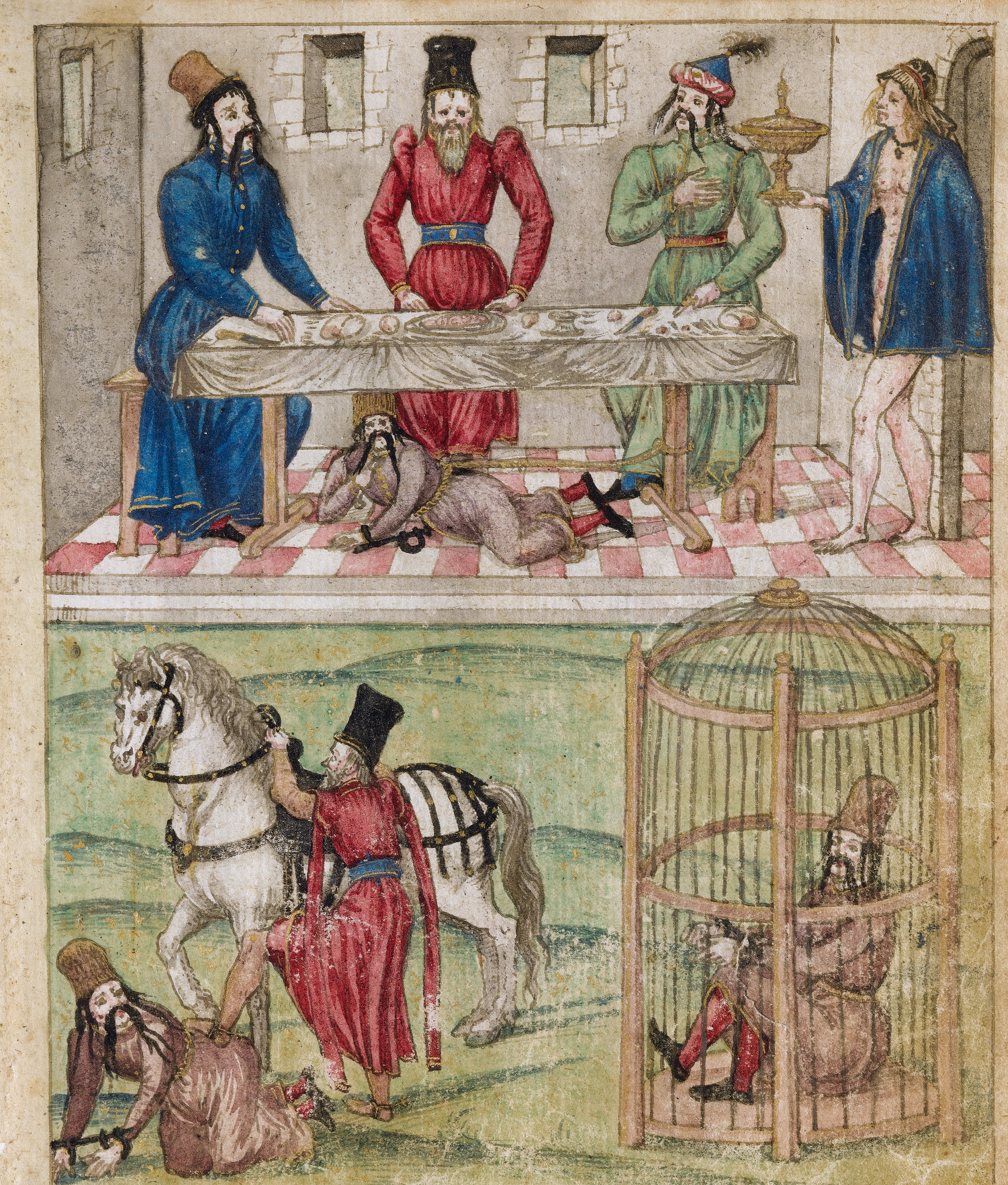
Timur the Great’s imprisonment of the Ottoman Sultan Bayezid

Bajazet (Italian pronunciation: [baʒaˈze]) is an opera by Francesco Gasparini, a revision of his 1711 work Tamerlano. It was first performed at the Teatro Pubblico in Reggio Emilia in 1719, with designs by Pietro Righini.

The first production included Francesco Borosini in the title role, Antonio Bernacchi (Tamerlano), Marina Benta Bulgarelli (Asteria), Faustina Bordoni (Irene), Diana Vico (Andronico), Antonio Piasi (Clearco), Battista Roberti (Leone) and Girolamo Bartoluzzi Regiano (Zaida).

A second production was staged in Venice in 1723. Three versions of the work are known, but it is only the 1719 one for which all the music is known to have survived.

== Composition ==
Bajazet was a nearly complete rewrite of Tamerlano - there are only six arias in common between them. The rewriting was prompted by the need to rework the material around the renowned tenor Francesco Borosini. The original libretto by Agostino Piovene was extensively rewritten by Ippolito Zanelli - the role of Bajazet was expanded and made central to the new work, with his suicide now shown on stage rather than merely described.

The number of parts and the distribution of arias also changed significantly between Tamerlano and Bajazet. Musically the focus of Tamerlano was Asteria, who had 9 arias, with only 6 for Bajazet and 5 for Tamerlano. The parts in Bajazet are more evenly balanced, and the minor characters were rewritten and given more arias to sing.

== Roles ==
Role	Voice type	Premiere Cast
Tamerlano, the emperor of the Tartars	alto castrato	Antonio Bernacchi
Bajazet, the emperor of the Turks, now a prisoner to Tamerlano	tenor	Francesco Borosini
Asteria, daughter of Bajazet, in love with Andronicus	soprano	Marianna Benti Bulgarelli, "la Romanina"
Irene, princess of Tresbisond, promised in marriage to Tamerlane	soprano	Faustina Bordoni
Andronicus, a prince from Greece, ally of Tamerlane	contralto in travesti	Diana Vico
Clearco, another prince from Greece, ally of Tamerlane	? castrato	Antonio Pasi
Leone, Bajazet's general, a confidant of Asteria	? castrato	Giovan Battista Roberti
Zaida, a Moor with Asteria	soprano castrato (in travesti)	Girolamo Bartoluzzi

== Influence ==
When Borosini went to London in 1724, he brought with him the score for Bajazet and showed it to George Frideric Handel. Handel had already written his own opera Tamerlano on the basis of the 1711 Piovene libretto, simplifying it by eliminating all the secondary characters except Leone. However when Borosini showed him the score for Bajazet he rewrote his own material again, adding in a death scene for Borosini in the title role. The libretto Handel eventually used was written for him by Nicola Francesco Haym and amalgamated elements from Gasparini’s libretto from both 1711 and 1719. Handel also cut much of the recitative in Gasparini’s version, as was his usual practice.

== Modern revival ==
Gasparini’s 1719 score may have been performed once of twice after the Reggio Emilia production, but the work was then neglected until 2014, when it was revived by Auser Musici and performed at the Opera Barga Festival.
