= Giovanni Perroni =

Italian cellist and composer

Giovanni Perroni (1688, Oleggio, Novara, - March 10, 1748, Vienna) was an Italian cellist and composer. His known works include eight oratorios, three operas, a song cycle, and a cello concerto. His Cello Concerto in D minor premiered in Vienna in 1712 and consists of three movements: Grave - Allegro - Grave - Allegro, Grave (solo and continuo), and Grave - Allegro. The work remains part of the cello concert repertoire.

Perroni served as a cellist and composer in the court of Francesco Farnese, Duke of Parma from 1704-1714. He served as maestro di cappella of the Santa Maria delle Grazie in Milan, and as a cellist in the Court of Milan from 1718-1720. In 1721 Charles VI, Holy Roman Emperor appointed him as cellist in the royal court of Vienna, and he remained in that post until his death twenty-seven years later. In 1726 he married the opera singer Anna d’Ambreville whose sister, Rosa Borosini, was married to tenor Francesco Borosini.

== Sources ==
- Rudolf Schnitzler: "Perroni [Peroni], Giovanni", Grove Music Online ed. L. Macy (Accessed September 15, 2019), (subscription access)
