= Tamerlano (Gasparini opera) =

1711 opera by Francesco Gasparini

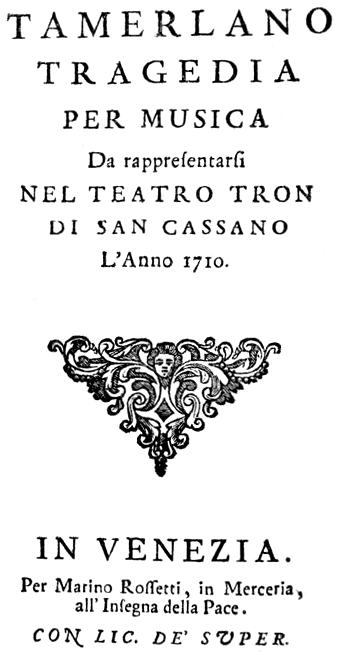
Title page of the libretto, Venice 1711 (Note: The Venetian calendar marked the beginning of the year on 1 March, so by this reckoning the first performance (January 1711) was actually in late 1710, as indicated on the frontispiece of the libretto.)

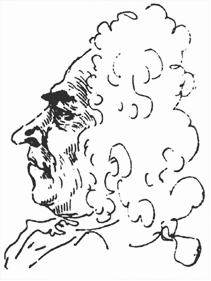
Sketch of Francesco Gasparini

Tamerlano (Tamerlane) is a tragic opera in three acts by Francesco Gasparini based on a libretto by Agostino Piovene. It was first performed at the Teatro San Cassiano in Venice on 24 January 1711.

Piovene’s libretto was based on Tamerlan ou La mort de Bajazet by Jacques Pradon (1675). It was Piovene’s second libretto as well as his second collaboration with Gasparini. Tamerlano was Gasparini’s most famous opera, distinguished by the unusual decision to assign the role of Bajazet to a tenor, Giovanni Paita, rather than to a castrato.

== Roles ==
The opera’s role were Tamerlano (soprano), Bajazet (tenor), Asteria (soprano), Andronico (alto), Irene (soprano), Clearco, Leone and Zaida. The prima donna role was Astoria with nine arias; Bajazet had six, Tamerlano five, while Andronico and Irene had four each.

== Plot ==
The plot concerns a series of dilemmas facing the Turkish sovereign Bajazet who has been defeated and humiliated by Tamerlano, emperor of the Tartars. Tamerlane cannot destroy Bajazet because he loves his daughter Asteria; Bajazet wishes to end the humiliation of his defeat by committing suicide but fears for his daughter’s safety; Asteria would like to reject Tamerlane in favour of Andronico but cannot because of his complicity with Tamerlane; Andronico cannot openly declare his love for Asteria because of the bonds of duty to her father; Irene wants to end her engagement to Tamerlane but is obliged to wait. Finally Asteria, Andronico and Bajazet defy Tamerlane who condemns them all, bringing about a crisis that is resolved only by Bajazet’s suicide. Only a couple of arias remain from the 1711 version.

== Later productions and adaptation ==
In 1714 Tamerlano was staged at the Teatro del Falcone in Genoa. In 1719 Gasparini revised the work for a new production in Reggio Emilia. Now entitled Bajazet, this new version starred tenor Francesco Borosini in the title role.

George Frideric Handel certainly studied both of Gasparini’s versions of the opera before creating his own Tamerlano in 1724.

== Notes and references ==
Notes
