= Cecilia Monti =

Italian opera singer

Cecilia Monti (1710- died after 1737), was an Italian opera singer of Roman origin who was active in Italy and central Europe ca. 1726-37. She is known to be the first soprano to play the part of Rosalba in La pravità castigata (1730), an opera performed in Prague that was the first 18th-century opera based on the Don Juan legend. She usually appeared in comic roles with her partner, the Venetian bass Bartolomeo Cajo.
