= Rosa Borosini =

Italian opera singer

Rosa Borosini (née d'Ambreville; c. 1693 - died after 1740) was an Italian soprano and the wife of tenor Francesco Borosini (married 1722). In 1716 she created the role of Getilde in the world premiere of Antonio Vivaldi's La costanza trionfante degl'amori e de gl'odii.

Born in Modena, Rosa's father was the second maestro di cappella in the court of Francesco II d'Este, Duke of Modena, and her sister was the contralto Anna Ambreville who was married to cellist and composer Giovanni Perroni. She began her career at the Teatro Ducale di Piazza in Modena where she was committed in 1713-1714, 1717, and 1720. She also performed in opera houses in Venice (1715–16), Mantua (1718) and Turin (1719), before being engaged by Charles VI, Holy Roman Emperor for his court theater at a salary of 1800 florins on March 1, 1721. She remained in that post until her retirement with a pension in 1740. In 1723 she performed in the premiere of Vinzenz Fux's Costanza e Fortezza in Prague, and was also heard there is several oratorios by Antonio Caldara.
