= The Stone Guest =

The Stone Guest may refer to:

- The Stone Guest (painting), a painting by Francisco Goya
- The Stone Guest (play), an 1830 poetic drama by Alexander Pushkin
- The Stone Guest (opera), an 1872 opera by Alexander Dargomyzhsky set almost directly to Pushkin's work

== See also ==
- Il convitato di pietra (disambiguation)
- The Stoned Guest, parody ostensibly by P. D. Q. Bach (as "discovered" by Peter Schickele) of the Dargomyzhsky opera, of Mozart's Don Giovanni, and of other versions of the Don Juan legend
