= La costanza trionfante degl'amori e de gl'odii =

Opera by Antonio Vivaldi

- Dramma per musica by Antonio Vivaldi
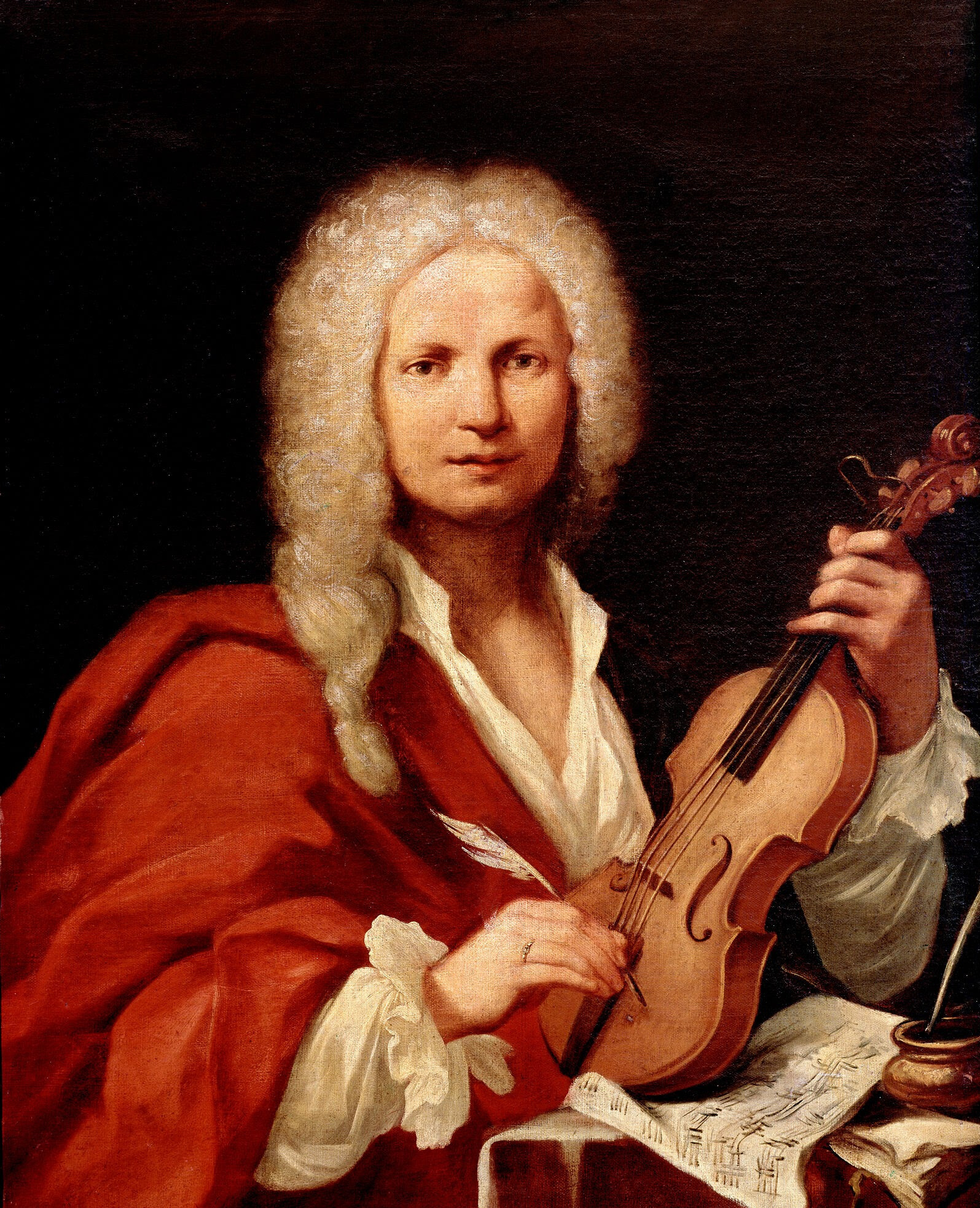
- Putative portrait of Antonio Vivaldi, c. 1723
- Librettist: A. Marchi
- Language: Italian
- Premiere: 1716; Teatro San Moisè, Venice

La costanza trionfante degl'amori e degl'odii is a dramma per musica (lit. 'drama for music') by Antonio Vivaldi. The Italian libretto was by A Marchi.

The opera was first performed at the Teatro San Moisè in Venice on 18 January 1716, during carnival. It was revived for the same theatre at the Carnival of 1718, under the title Artabano, re de' Parti.

== Roles ==
Role	Voice type	Premiere cast, 1716 (Conductor: - )
Farnace	contralto (en travesti)	Rosa Mignati
Olderico	tenor	Carlo Antonio Mazza
Getilde	contralto	Rosa d'Ambreville
Eumena	contralto	Chiara Stella Cenacchi
Doriclea	soprano	Francesca Miniati
Tigrane	contralto castrato	Filippo Piccoli
Artabano	tenor	Antonio Denzio
