= Choustníkovo Hradiště =

- Market town
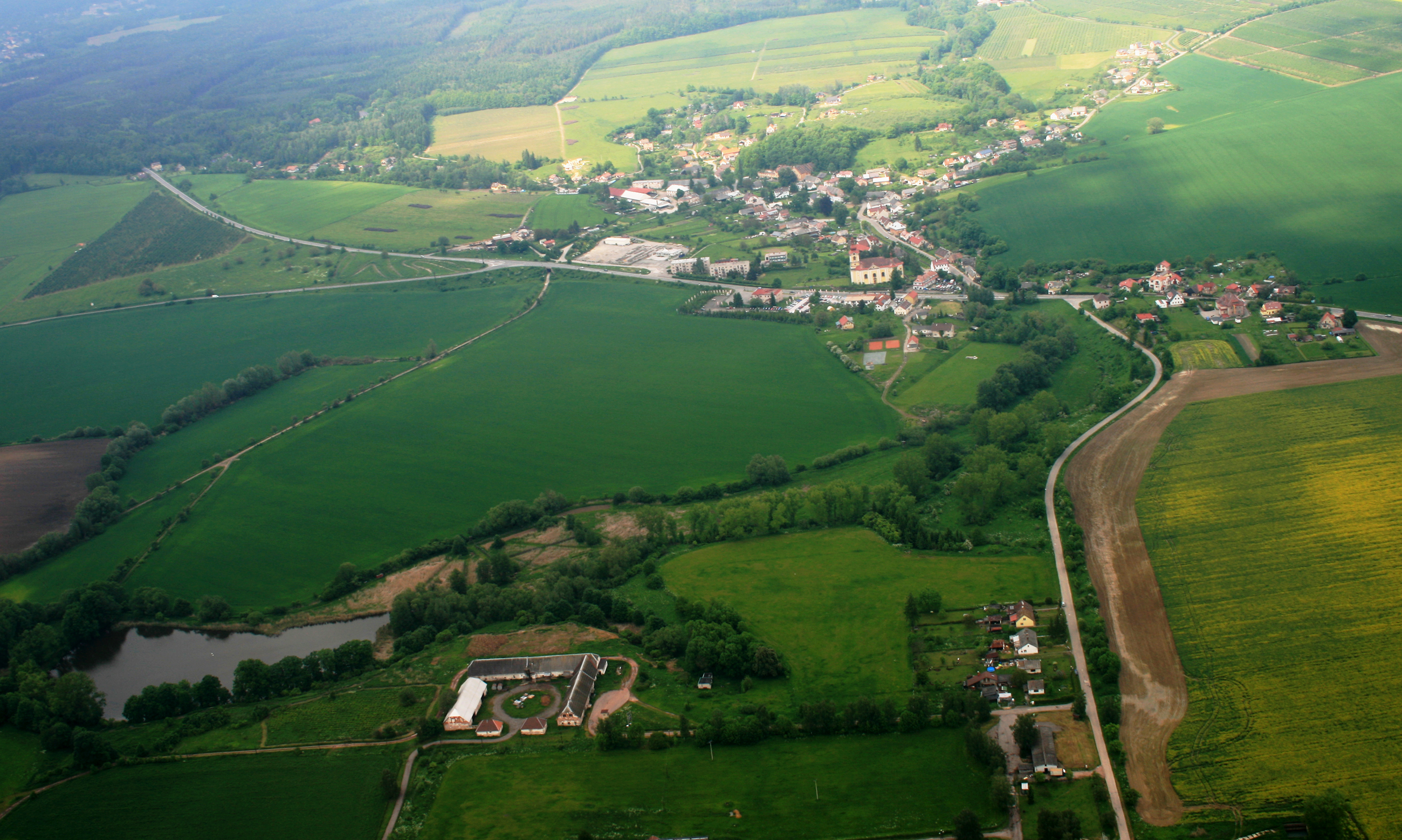
- Aerial view

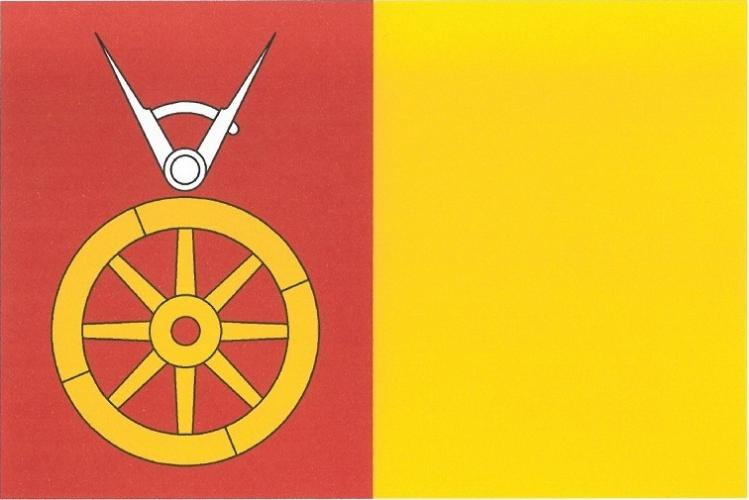
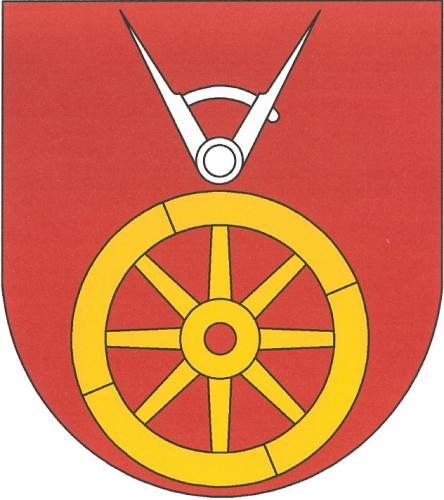
- Flag Coat of arms

- Location in the Czech Republic
- Coordinates: 50°25′35″N 15°52′43″E
- Country: Czech Republic
- Region: Hradec Králové
- District: Trutnov
- First mentioned: 1316

Area
  - Total: 12.49 km^{2} (4.82 sq mi)
- Elevation: 286 m (938 ft)

Population (2026-01-01)
  - Total: 624
  - Density: 50.0/km^{2} (129/sq mi)
- Time zone: UTC+1 (CET)
  - Summer (DST): UTC+2 (CEST)
- Postal code: 544 42
- Website: www.choustnikovohradiste.cz

Choustníkovo Hradiště (Czech pronunciation: [ˈxoustɲiːkovo ˈɦraɟɪʃcɛ]; German: Gradlitz) is a market town in Trutnov District in the Hradec Králové Region of the Czech Republic. It has about 600 inhabitants.

== Etymology ==
The settlement was named after the local castle (hradiště), owned by Heřmaň of Choustník.

== Geography ==
Choustníkovo Hradiště is located about 15 kilometres (9 mi) south of Trutnov and 24 km (15 mi) north of Hradec Králové. It lies on the border between the Jičín Uplands and Giant Mountains Foothills. The highest point is at 467 m (1,532 ft) above sea level. The stream Kocbeřský potok flows through the market town.

== History ==
The Šlosberk Castle was built here at the beginning of the 14th century. The first written mention of the castle is from 1316. In the 1380s, the castle was bought by Heřmaň of Choustník, who had it completely rebuilt. Since then, the castle and the village below the castle were known as Heřmanův Choustník or Choustníkovo Hradiště. The Lords of Choustník owned Choustníkovo Hradiště until the death of Beneš of Choustník in 1410. In 1516, Choustníkovo Hradiště was promoted to a market town.

Until the mid-17th century, Choustníkovo Hradiště often changed owners. In 1645, during the Thirty Years' War, the castle was destroyed by the Swedish army led by Lennart Torstensson. Around 1660, Choustníkovo Hradiště was bought by the Sporck family. Count Jan Sporck had reconstructed the castle and lived there until his death in 1679. His son František Antonín had further reconstructed and extended the castle. In 1705, the castle was rebuilt into a convent. During the Silesian Wars, the castle was badly damaged. The roof was repaired in 1754 and the premises then served as a granary, but at the turn of the 18th and 19th centuries, the castle quickly fell into disrepair. The remains of the castle and its walls began to be demolished at that time, and the stone was used to build houses in the market town.

== Demographics ==
Historical population

Year	Pop.	±%
1869	1,029	—
1880	1,100	+6.9%
1890	1,101	+0.1%
1900	957	−13.1%
1910	966	+0.9%

Year	Pop.	±%
1921	1,023	+5.9%
1930	932	−8.9%
1950	687	−26.3%
1961	712	+3.6%
1970	651	−8.6%

Year	Pop.	±%
1980	612	−6.0%
1991	588	−3.9%
2001	598	+1.7%
2011	576	−3.7%
2021	548	−4.9%

Source: Censuses

== Transport ==
The I/37 road (the section from Trutnov to Jaroměř) runs through the market town.

== Sights ==
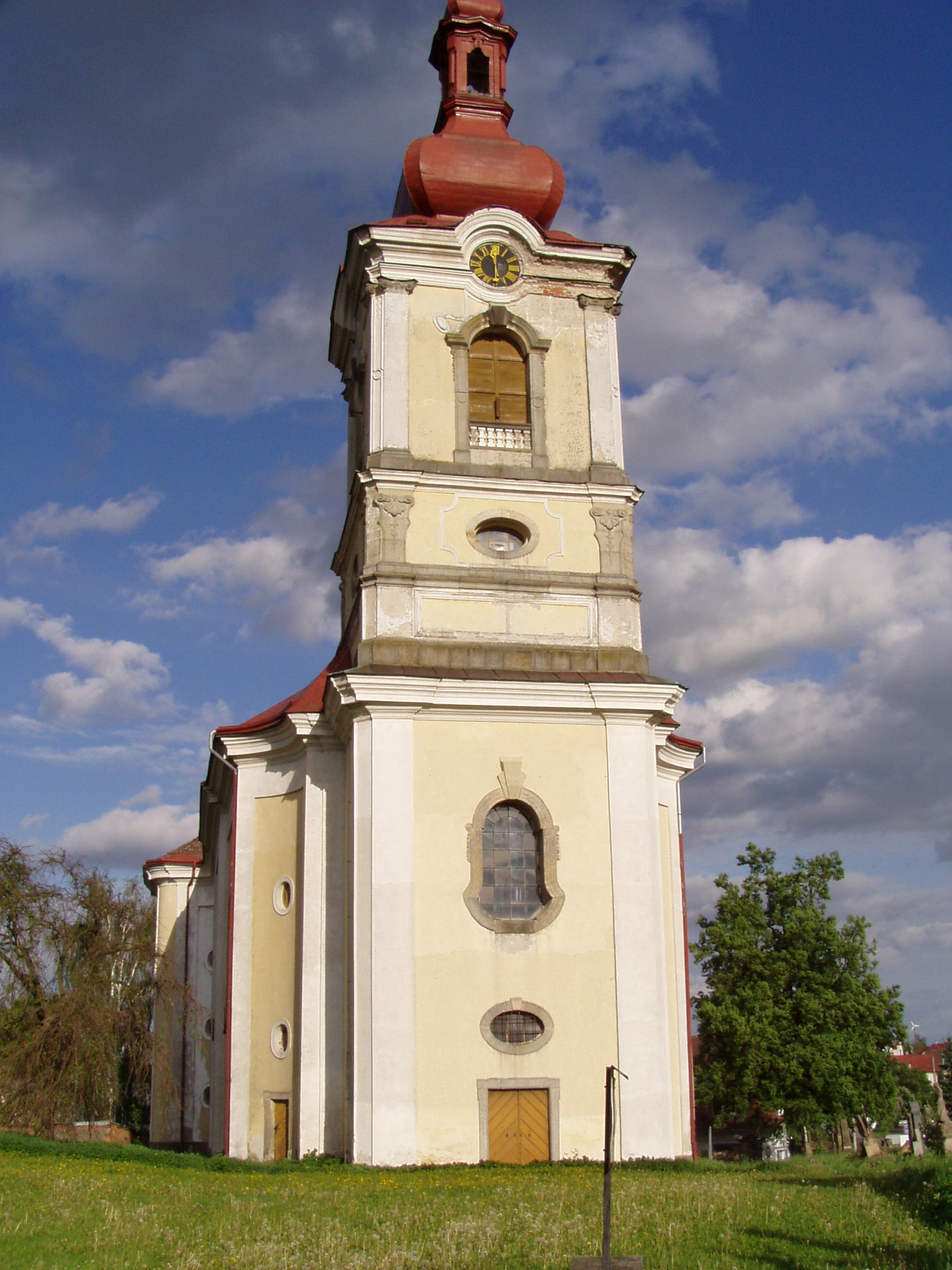
Church of the Holy Cross

The main landmark of Choustníkovo Hradiště is the Church of the Holy Cross. It was built in the late Baroque style in 1760–1770. Next to the church is a Baroque rectory from 1723.

Only a few remains of walls, cellars and ditches survived from the castle. The ruin is freely accessible.
