= La pravità castigata =

1730 opera with music of Antonio Caldara

La pravità castigata ("Depravity Punished") is a 1730 pastiche with music by multiple composers and an Italian language libretto by Antonio Denzio. It is the first 18th-century opera based on the Don Juan legend. It was also the first opera ever produced that retains the original setting and at least some of the original character names derived from early 17th-century dramatic prototypes of the Don Juan legend, the most important of which is Tirso de Molina's play El burlador de Sevilla y convidado de piedra. La pravità castigata was originally performed during Lent of 1730 in the opera theater of Franz Anton von Sporck in Prague, then revived with new music by Eustachio Bambini in Brno in 1734. The Brno performance was regarded as the original production for decades, and a published transcription of the libretto (which is missing two scenes from the Prague production) identifies it incorrectly as an anonymous text first performed in Brno.

== Composition and performance history ==
The origins of La pravità castigata lie in the struggles of the impresario of the Sporck theater, Antonio Denzio, to attract audiences for his productions as the appeal of his venture fell into decline. There was great interest in the productions he started in Prague in 1724 for about five years, then attendance dropped sharply. Denzio was eventually forced to close his theater in 1735 after spending time in debtors' prison. One of the ideas that Denzio had to generate income for his failing opera company was to extend the operatic season into Lent, even though theaters throughout Europe were traditionally closed during the penitential seasons of Advent and Lent. Denzio's first Lenten opera was performed in 1729, a staged oratorio Sansone based on the Old Testament legend of Samson. The production included a highly unusual recitation of Jewish chants, whose Sephardic or Ashkenazic origins were carefully recorded in the libretto. For his second Lenten opera, Denzio attempted to stage something much more titillating and innovative in the way of subject matter. Before any opera could be performed in Prague during Lent, the express permission of the archbishop of Prague, Count Ferdinand von Khünburg, was required. In order to secure it, Denzio explained to the archbishop the beneficial effect for audience members of portraying on stage Don Juan's spectacular damnation for a multitude of sins never repented for. The archbishop did not express any disapproval and quickly issued the necessary decree to permit the performance of the opera.

The libretto Denzio wrote for his Don Juan opera is unusual for its time in mixing comic and serious scenes into the main fabric of the drama. His designation for the work, a rappresentazione morale ("morality play") is probably unique for an opera of this era. After the libretto "reform" of the turn of the 18th century, it was not customary to mix serious and comic action in opera librettos. If comic action were to be included in an evening's entertainment, it would usually be confined to comic intermezzi that were presented between the acts of a serious drama. Denzio's drama preserves the mixing of serious and comic action that would be more typical of 17th-century Venetian librettos. This trait is invited, of course, by the subject matter and his obvious literary model, the play Il convitato di pietra by Giacinto Andrea Cicognini, the prototype dramatization for Italian versions of the Don Juan tale, considered much more vulgar than the Spanish drama of Tirso de Molina. Most operas with serious action from the 1720s and 1730s are set in the distant past (usually no later than the period of the European Dark Ages). Denzio did not precisely identify the time period for his Don Juan drama, but cultural and political references clearly indicate early modern times. Although the characters are mainly Spaniards, the action is set entirely in the Kingdom of Naples, which was ruled by members or allies of Spanish royal houses for centuries.

No score for the opera survives. Its music was a pasticcio of arias borrowed from other operas. Most of them were taken from works by Antonio Caldara, as indicated by Denzio in the preface to his libretto. Caldara is not named directly, rather he is merely hinted at. It is possible that Denzio concealed the borrowings due to Caldara's position in the musical establishment of Holy Roman Emperor Charles VI in Vienna, which could have put Caldara in a position to retaliate for the unauthorized use of his music (Prague at that time was under the authority of Charles VI, who held the title King of Bohemia). From the texts preserved in surviving copies of the libretto, it has been possible to identify a few of the Caldara arias used in La pravità castigata (at least one other aria appears to have been borrowed from an opera by Antonio Vivaldi). The recitative used in the production was likely composed by Matteo Luchini, a minor composer attached to the Denzio company who also appeared in the production as a singer, indeed as Don Giovanni in this production. No reaction is recorded over Denzio's ironic decision to cast a castrato singer as the world's greatest seducer.

In spite of the unfamiliar setting in Naples, the Denzio drama features many incidents and characters familiar to operatic audiences from Mozart's opera Don Giovanni. The central character, the seducer Don Giovanni, is also dragged down to hell for murdering an aged military officer (the Commendatore) who angered Don Giovanni by trying to defend the honor of his beloved daughter. Denzio included the daughter's ineffectual fiancé and Don Giovanni's cowardly servant besides other characters that originate in the Don Juan dramas of Tirso and Cicognini. Don Giovanni's standard techniques of trying to seduce lower-class women with promises of marriage and upper-class women by appearing to them disguised as their lovers are carefully respected.

Almost nothing is known about the reception of Denzio's highly innovative operatic production. One of the surviving copies of the librettos does record a mildly positive reaction to the opera, but the best measure of its success is the revival of the libretto with new music in Brno four years after its premiere.

== Roles ==
Role	Voice type	Premiere cast, Lent 1730, Sporck Theater, Prague
Manfredi, king of Naples	uncertain	Filippo Galletti
Don Alvaro, Commendatore of Sant'Iago and minister of the king	tenor	Antonio Denzio
Donna Isabella, his daughter, promised in marriage to the duke of Chiarenza	soprano	Girolama Madonis
Don Garzia, a royal counselor	uncertain	anonymous ("il Sig. N.N.")
Donna Beatrice, a court lady	soprano	Anna Cosimi
Don Ottavio, duke of Chiarenza, betrothed to Donna Isabella	soprano	Margherita Flora (in a breeches role)
Don Giovanni, a foreigner in Naples	tenor	Matteo Luchini
Rosalba, a fishergirl who lives on the beach near Naples	soprano	Cecilia Monti
Bognolo, Venetian servant of the duke of Chiarenza	uncertain	anonymous ("il Sig. N.N.")
Malorco	bass	Bartolomeo Cajo
