= Franz Anton von Sporck =

Czech-German nobleman and patron of the arts (1662–1738)

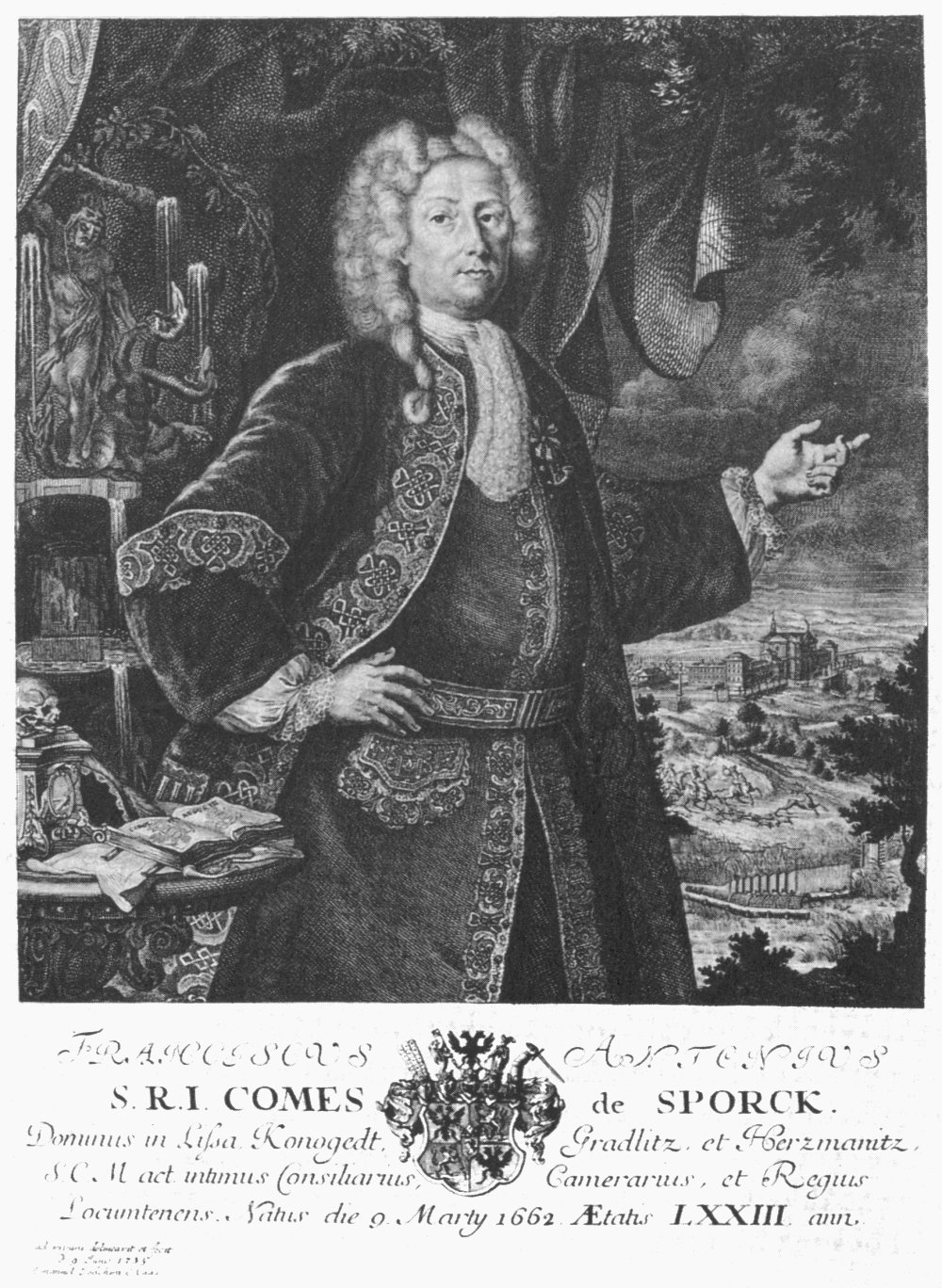
Engraving of Count Franz Anton von Sporck from the year 1735

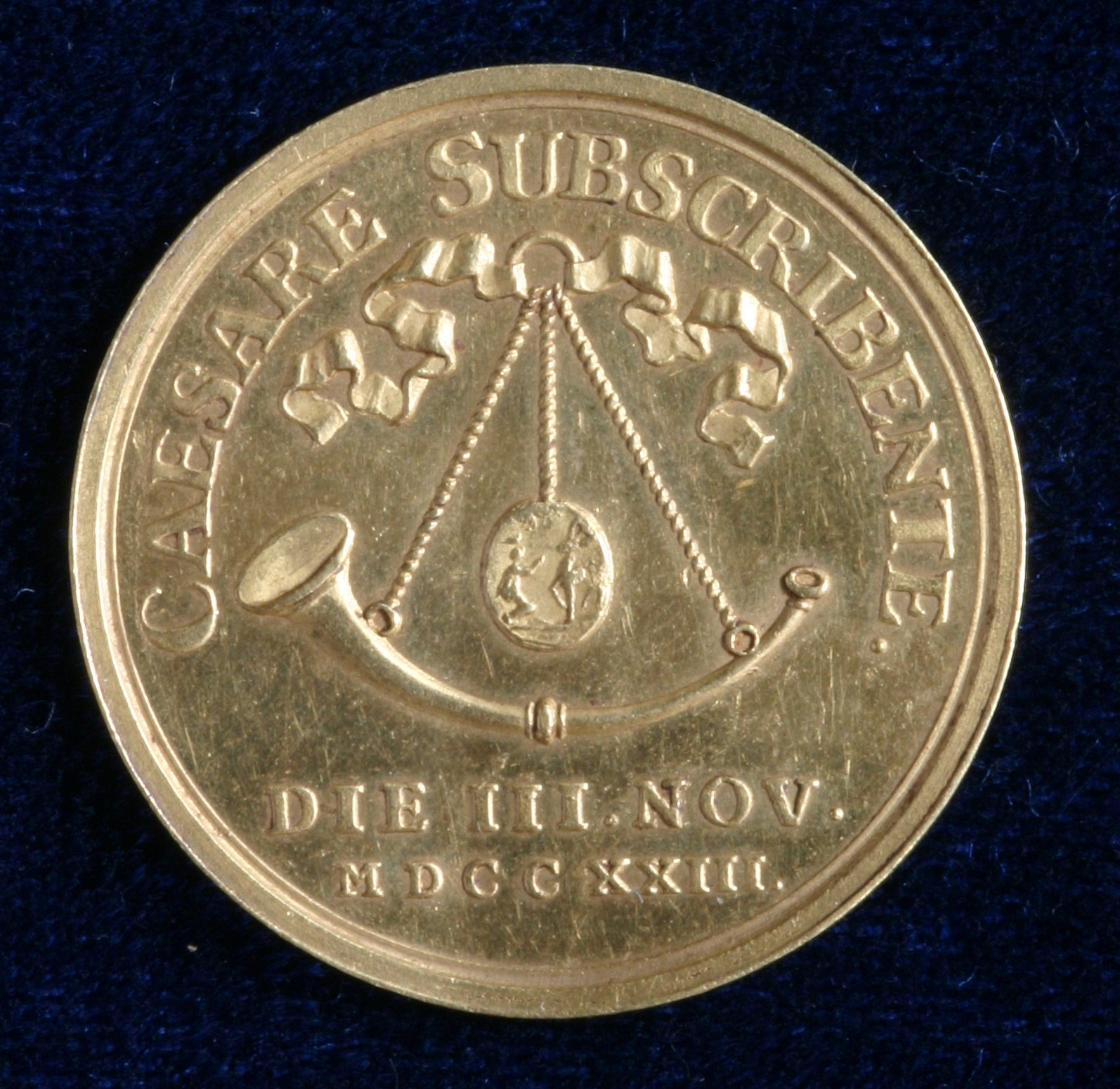
Order of St. Hubertus

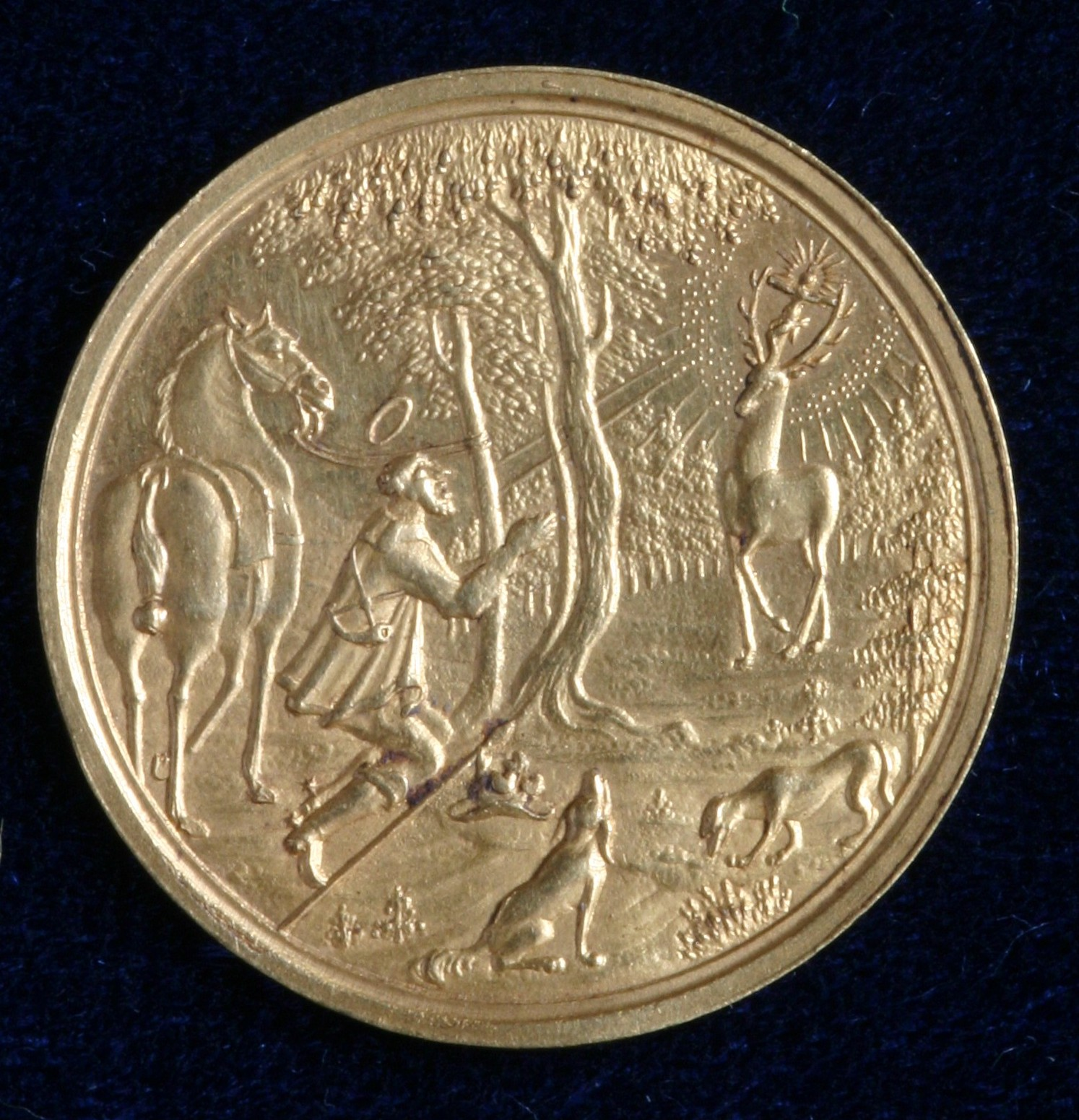
Medal of 1723

Count Franz Anton von Sporck (German: Franz Anton Reichsgraf von Sporck, Czech: František Antonín hrabě Špork; 9 March 1662 in – 30 March 1738) was a German Bohemian literatus and patron of the arts. He was one of the most notable cultural and intellectual figures in central Europe in the early 18th century.

== Life ==
Franz Anton von Sporck was born on 9 March 1662 in Lysá nad Labem or Heřmanův Městec. He was born the eldest of four children of Count Johann von Sporck (1595–1679) by his second wife, Eleonore Katharine von Fineke (d. 1677). His father had been born in rather humble circumstances in Westphalia, but was rewarded handsomely for distinguished military leadership in the service of the Habsburg dynasty during the Thirty Years' War. It was a habit of the Habsburg emperors to reward favorites with lands confiscated from dispossessed Protestant Bohemian nobles who refused to convert to Catholicism after the defeat of the Estates of Bohemia at the Battle of White Mountain in 1620.

Count Sporck's father was an archetypal example of this sort of favorite, first ennobled with the rank of baron in 1647, then imperial count in 1664. He was given vast amounts of land in Bohemia that Count Sporck would later inherit. Typical of the Germanized Catholic nobility in Bohemia of his day, Count Sporck considered himself ethnically German and exhibited scant interest in Czech culture. He attended school first in Heřmanův Městec, then at the Jesuit Latin School in Kutná Hora. In 1675 he began to attend lectures in philosophy and law at Charles-Ferdinand University in the Prague Clementinum. He graduated in 1678 at the age of sixteen. In 1680 he embarked on a Grand Tour of Europe that brought him to Rome, Turin, southern France, Spain, Paris, England, The Hague, and Brussels. He traveled for a second time to Paris in 1682 after returning to Bohemia in 1681. He acquired a lifelong appreciation of French literature from his travels in France. As he was still a minor at the time of his father's death, he was able to assume control of his inheritance only in 1684. This included the estates of Lysá, Konojedy, Choustníkovo Hradiště, and Malešov. It was on the estate of Choustníkovo Hradiště in northern Bohemia that he later built his own residence of Kuks. He also inherited the family palace in Prague and a considerable sum of money.

In 1686 he married the Franziska Apollonia, née Baroness von Swéerts zu Reist (1667–1726), a member of a Silesian noble family originally from Brussels. The marriage was a happy one. Together the couple had two daughters, Countess Elenora Franziska (1687–1717), a Canoness of the Church of the Annunciation of the Virgin Mary, Uherské Hradiště, Countess Anna Katherina (1689–1754), and a son, Count Johann Franz Anton Joseph Adam (born 1699), who did not survive infancy. In 1718 Count Sporck adopted the husband of his younger daughter Anna Katherina, Franz Karl Rudolph von Swéerts zu Reist, and it was he who inherited the Sporck estates, taking the name Swéerts-Sporck.

Much of Count Sporck's early adulthood was spent improving and expanding his estates and participating in public affairs. In the early 1690s he was awarded a number of prestigious imperial offices, including steward (Kämmerer) and Statthalter in 1690 and privy counselor (Wirklicher Geheimer Rat) in 1692. His title of Statthalter, which indicates merely that he held a seat on the Statthalterei, a committee of nobles that served as the highest local civil authority in the province of Bohemia at the time, has led to confusion in the English-language literature. Sometimes Count Sporck is referred to as the "Viceroy of Bohemia," a title that did not exist. In 1695 he founded a noted hunting society known as the Order of St. Hubertus.

In 1694, the Prague physician J. F. Love confirmed the healing properties of the spring that originated on the left side of the river in the southern portion of the estate of Choustníkovo Hradiště. Here was built the Kuks spa, later famous for its curative powers and the charity hospital attached to it. For the overall concept, design and execution of the building of the spa and castle of Kuks, Count Sporck commissioned the architect Giovanni Battista Alliprandi and the master mason Giovanni Pietro della Torre. The complex included the Church of the Holy Trinity, built for the benefit of war veterans and retired retainers as part of a foundation that he founded. The sculptor Matthias Braun beautified the grounds of Kuks with some of his finest works.

Count Sporck's intellectual interests led him to found a branch of Freemasonry in Bohemia, but they also had the effect of arousing the suspicion of the Habsburg ecclesiastical authorities for his flirtations with Jansenist philosophy and anti-Jesuitical polemicism. In 1729, his entire collection of books was carted away for investigation on the orders of Emperor Charles VI and he himself was temporarily arrested. He was cleared of all wrongdoing in 1734 after a great deal of political maneuvering and substantial expenditure of money, but he never recovered emotionally. The last four years of his life were spent in quiet retirement. He died in Lysá nad Labem on 30 March 1738.

=== Musical interests ===
There are three aspects of musical patronage that make Count Sporck notable to music lovers both inside and outside the Czech Republic: his introduction of the French horn into Bohemia, his foundation of the first permanent opera theater in the Bohemian lands, and a certain connection with the composer Johann Sebastian Bach that still lacks clarification.

Traditions of French horn playing were introduced in Bohemia after Count Sporck brought the instrument back with him from a visit to the court of Versailles in the spring of 1681. Its cultivation spread in Bohemia until the Bohemian horn players were generally acknowledged to be the best in Europe by the 18th century.

Count Sporck had long sponsored theatrical performances at Kuks and his palace in Prague, but in 1724 permitted an Italian opera company to perform in his Prague palace free of charge. The impetus for this move was the coronation of Charles VI in Prague in 1723, an event accompanied by lavish operatic productions on the grounds of Prague Castle. There was a recognition that Prague should have a permanent theater capable of presenting the "aristocratic" entertainment of opera, and Count Sporck saw fit to encourage the efforts of the Italian impresario Antonio Maria Peruzzi in founding the Prague theater, then Antonio Denzio, who soon supplanted Peruzzi, in continuing productions. There were also operatic productions for a few years at Kuks during the summer months. The Denzio company succeeded in attracting some of the most prominent singers in Italy to Prague, and used Antonio Vivaldi as a source of repertory and singers. Vivaldi himself visited Prague in the early 1730s as a result of his connections with the Sporck theater. Many creative operatic works were first performed in the Sporck theater, including the first opera to use the original settings and character names from the tradition of Don Juan dramatizations: the opera La pravità castigata (1730) with words by Antonio Denzio and music mainly by Antonio Caldara. Count Sporck did not provide financial support for the opera company beyond permitting the impresario to use the theater in his Prague palace free of charge, however, nor did he attend performances after the confiscation of his library in 1729. The Prague nobility gradually lost the interest in the Denzio productions, his company suffered serious financial reversals, and finally it collapsed in bankruptcy in 1735 with appeals to Count Sporck for assistance contemptuously dismissed.

Count Sporck is known to have maintained connections with the poet Picander in Leipzig, an individual well known to J. S. Bach, who set many of his texts to music. It is possible that this connection led Bach to try to cultivate Count Sporck, who was passionately interested in German poetry and even employed the poet Gottfried Benjamin Hancke permanently as a member of his household. The autograph score of the "Sanctus" of the Bach's Mass in B minor contains an annotation that a copy was sent to Count Sporck in Bohemia. There is no record in the voluminous surviving correspondence of Count Sporck that this gesture was ever acknowledged or rewarded with a payment to Bach. It is also not certain that the two ever met.

== Bibliography ==
- Pazaurek, Gustav Edmund. Franz Anton, Reichsgraf von Sporck : ein Mäcen der Barockzeit und seine Lieblingsschöpfung, Kukus. Leipzig, 1901.
- Benedikt, Heinrich. Franz Anton Graf von Sporck. Zur Kultur der Barockzeit in Böhmen. Vienna, 1923.
- Jelínek, Hanus. Histoire de la littérature tchèque. Paris, 1930.
- Preiss, Pavel. Boje s dvouhlavou saní. Prague, 1981.
- Preiss, Pavel. František Antonín Špork a barokní kultura v Čechách. Prague, 2003.
- Freeman, Daniel E. The Opera Theater of Count Franz Anton von Sporck in Prague. Stuyvesant, New York, 1992.
