= Kuks =

- Municipality
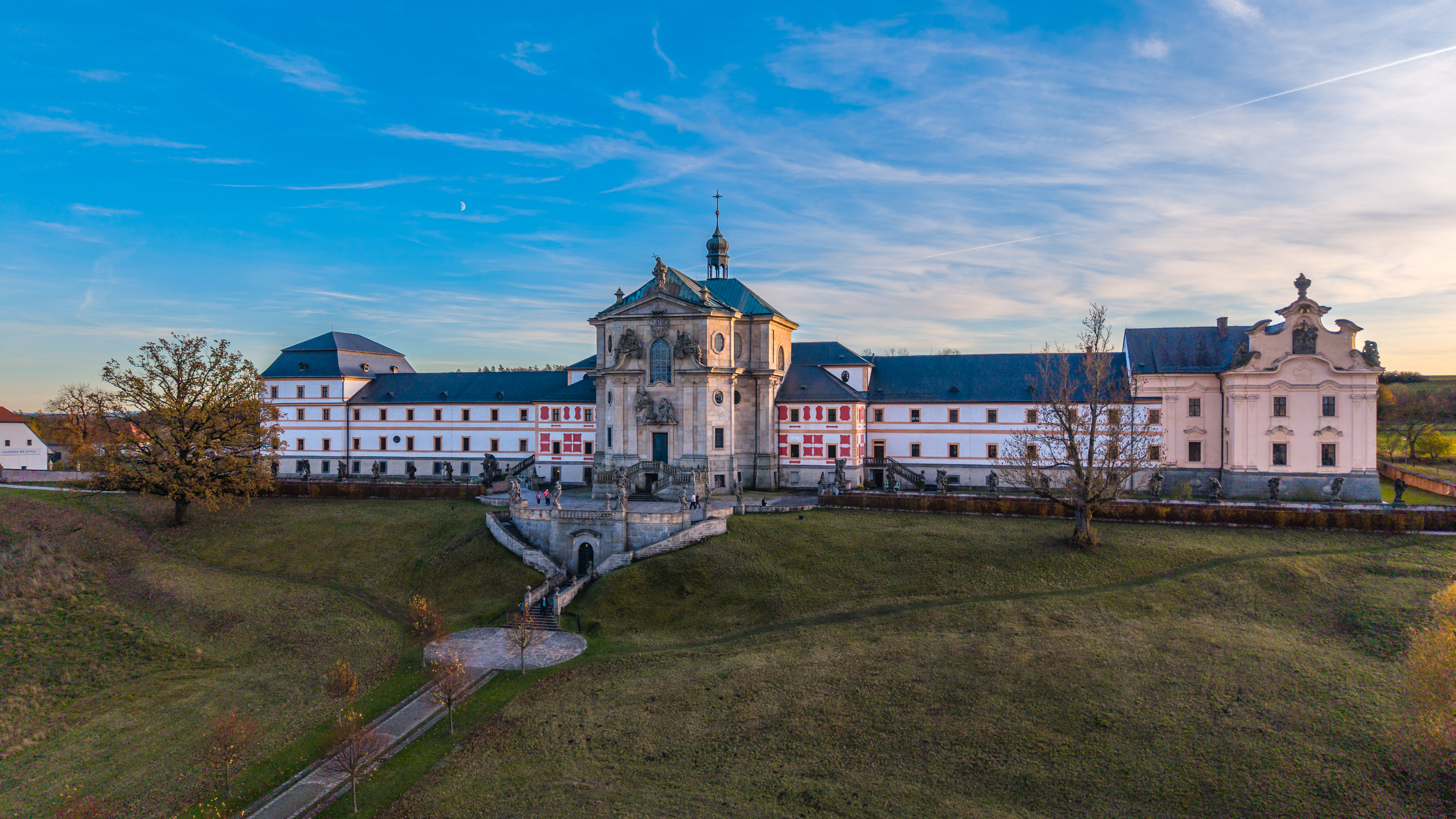
- Kuks Hospital

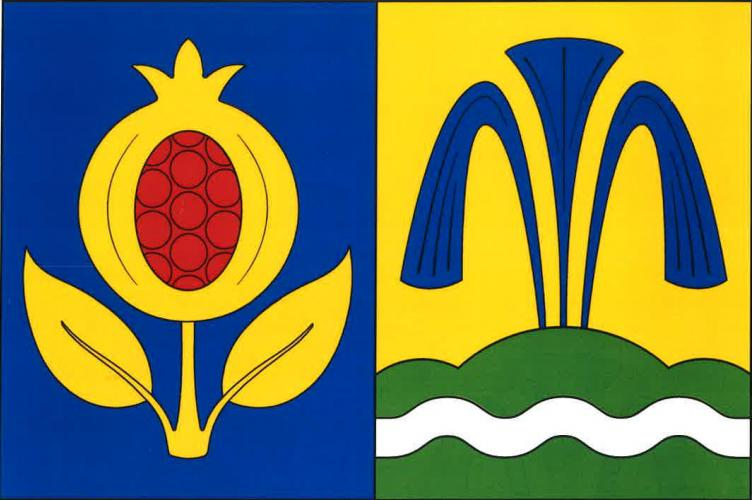
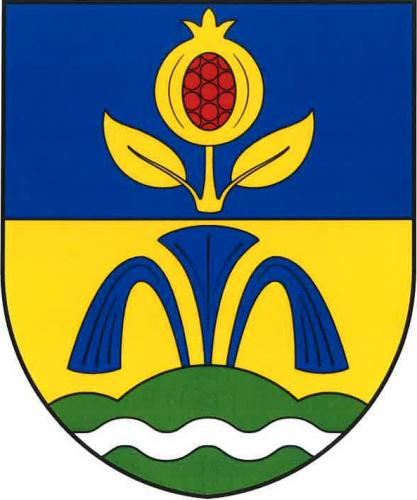
- Flag Coat of arms

- Location in the Czech Republic
- Coordinates: 50°24′6″N 15°53′22″E
- Country: Czech Republic
- Region: Hradec Králové
- District: Trutnov
- First mentioned: 1713

Area
  - Total: 4.84 km^{2} (1.87 sq mi)
- Elevation: 283 m (928 ft)

Population (2026-01-01)
  - Total: 243
  - Density: 50.2/km^{2} (130/sq mi)
- Time zone: UTC+1 (CET)
  - Summer (DST): UTC+2 (CEST)
- Postal code: 544 43
- Website: www.kuks.cz

Kuks (Czech pronunciation: [ˈkuks]; German: Kukus) is a municipality and village in Trutnov District in the Hradec Králové Region of the Czech Republic. It has about 200 inhabitants. The municipality is located on the Elbe River. Its main feature is a Baroque spa building with famous sculptures by Matthias Braun. The village with the Baroque complex is protected as a monument reservation.

== Administrative division ==
Kuks consists of two municipal parts (in brackets population according to the 2021 census):

- Kuks (187)
- Kašov (70)

== Etymology ==
The name is probably derived from an Old German word for share of mining revenue. According to another theory, the word meant ore smelting remains.

== Geography ==
Kuks is located about 18 kilometres (11 mi) south of Trutnov and 21 km (13 mi) north of Hradec Králové. It lies on the border of three geomorphological regions: the lowlands of East Elbe Table and Orlice Table, and the undulating landscape of the Jičín Uplands. The highest point is at 422 m (1,385 ft) above sea level. The Elbe River flows through the municipality.

== History ==
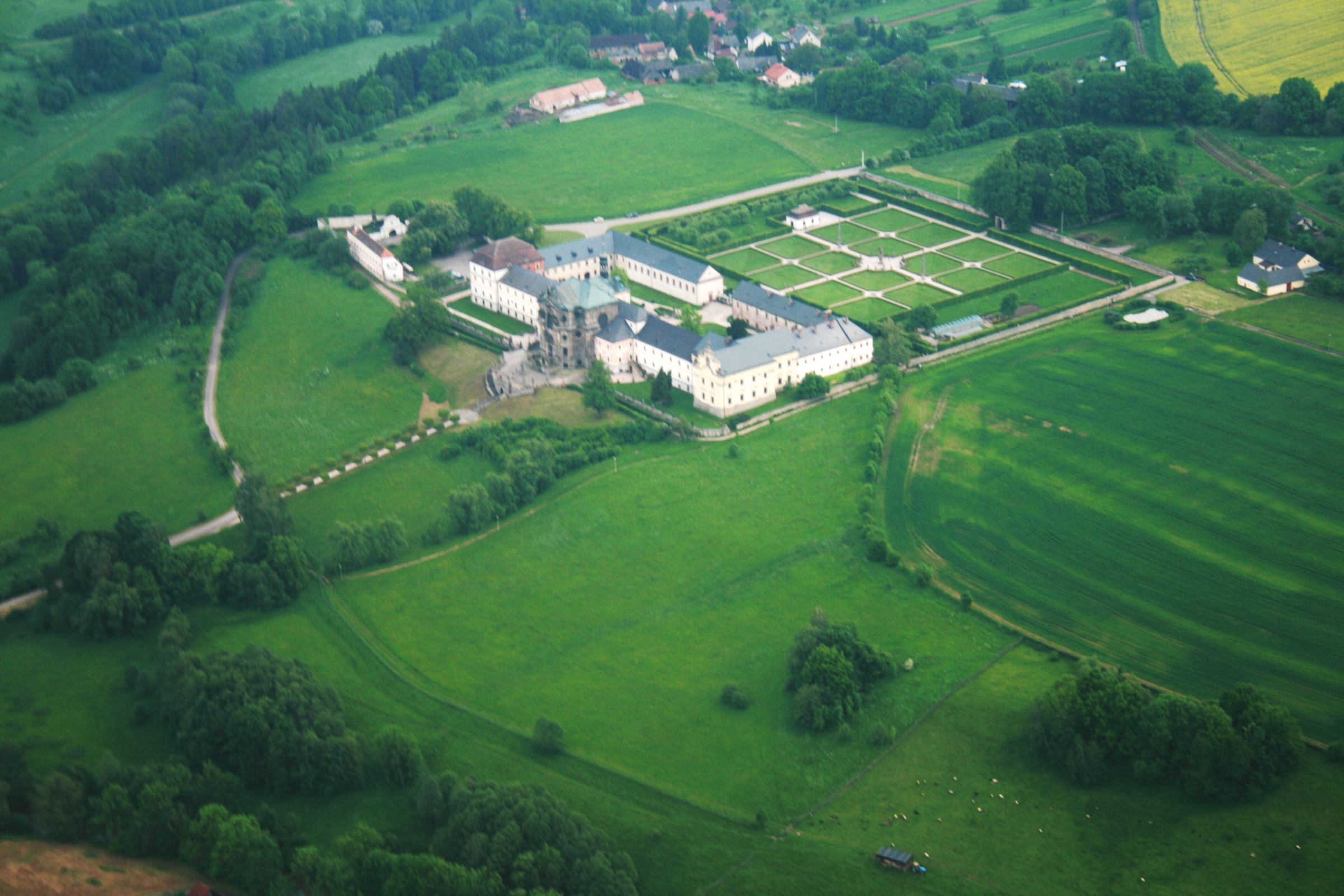
Aerial view of Kuks Hospital

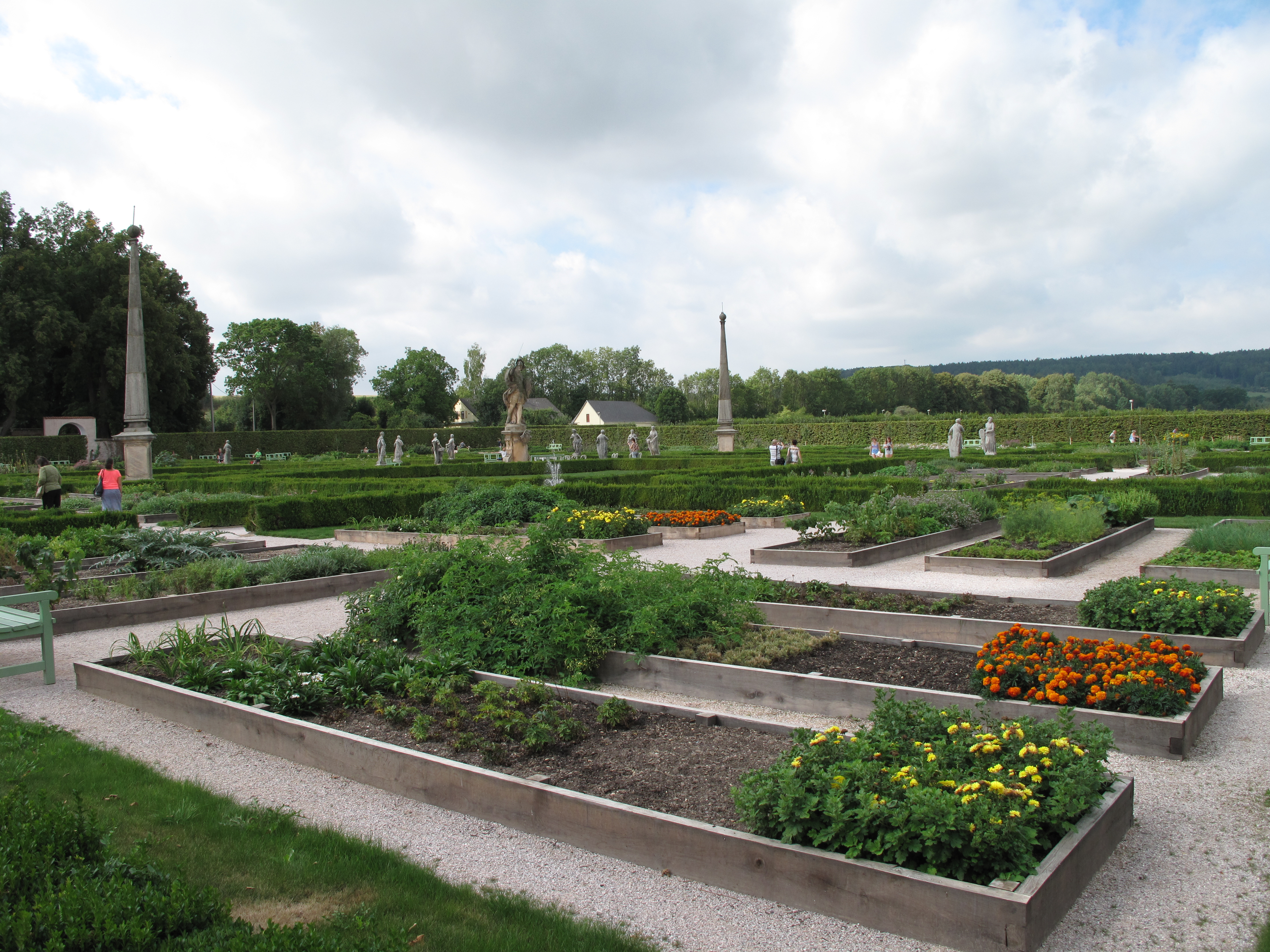
Gardens of the hospital

Before any settlement was established here, the area was used for gold panning. The Kuks village was founded after the spa was founded here. In 1684, the estate was acquired by Count Franz Anton von Sporck.

On the slope of the Elbe in Kuks, there used to be mineral springs. In 1692–1696, Count Sporck directed three of them at one place and built a simple spa. When the healing effects of the water were proven by professors of the Charles-Ferdinand University and experts from Baden-Baden, Sporck enlarged the spa.

In 1696, he had built Chapel of the Assumption of the Virgin Mary, followed by chateau in front of it in 1710. In 1707–1715, the hospital and the Church of the Holy Trinity with the crypt were built. The interiors and exteriors were decorated with Baroque sculptures by Matthias Braun, the most famous of which are the Virtues and Vices. Behind the hospital there was a garden, and the whole complex was closed by a cemetery.

Sporck died in 1738 and his heirs were not interested in maintaining the spa. A flood in 1740 destroyed most of the infrastructure and put the spa out of business. Kuks turned into a quiet village with mostly German population. In 1896, the uninhabited chateau burned down and in 1901, its ruins were demolished.

In 1938, Kuks was annexed by Nazi Germany and administered as part of the Reichsgau Sudetenland. After World War II, the German-speaking population was expelled and replaced by Czech settlers.

== Demographics ==
Historical population

Year	Pop.	±%
1869	894	—
1880	807	−9.7%
1890	746	−7.6%
1900	791	+6.0%
1910	741	−6.3%

Year	Pop.	±%
1921	587	−20.8%
1930	684	+16.5%
1950	415	−39.3%
1961	597	+43.9%
1970	387	−35.2%

Year	Pop.	±%
1980	304	−21.4%
1991	252	−17.1%
2001	233	−7.5%
2011	242	+3.9%
2021	257	+6.2%

Source: Censuses

== Transport ==
Kuks is located on the railway line Liberec–Jaroměř.

== Sights ==
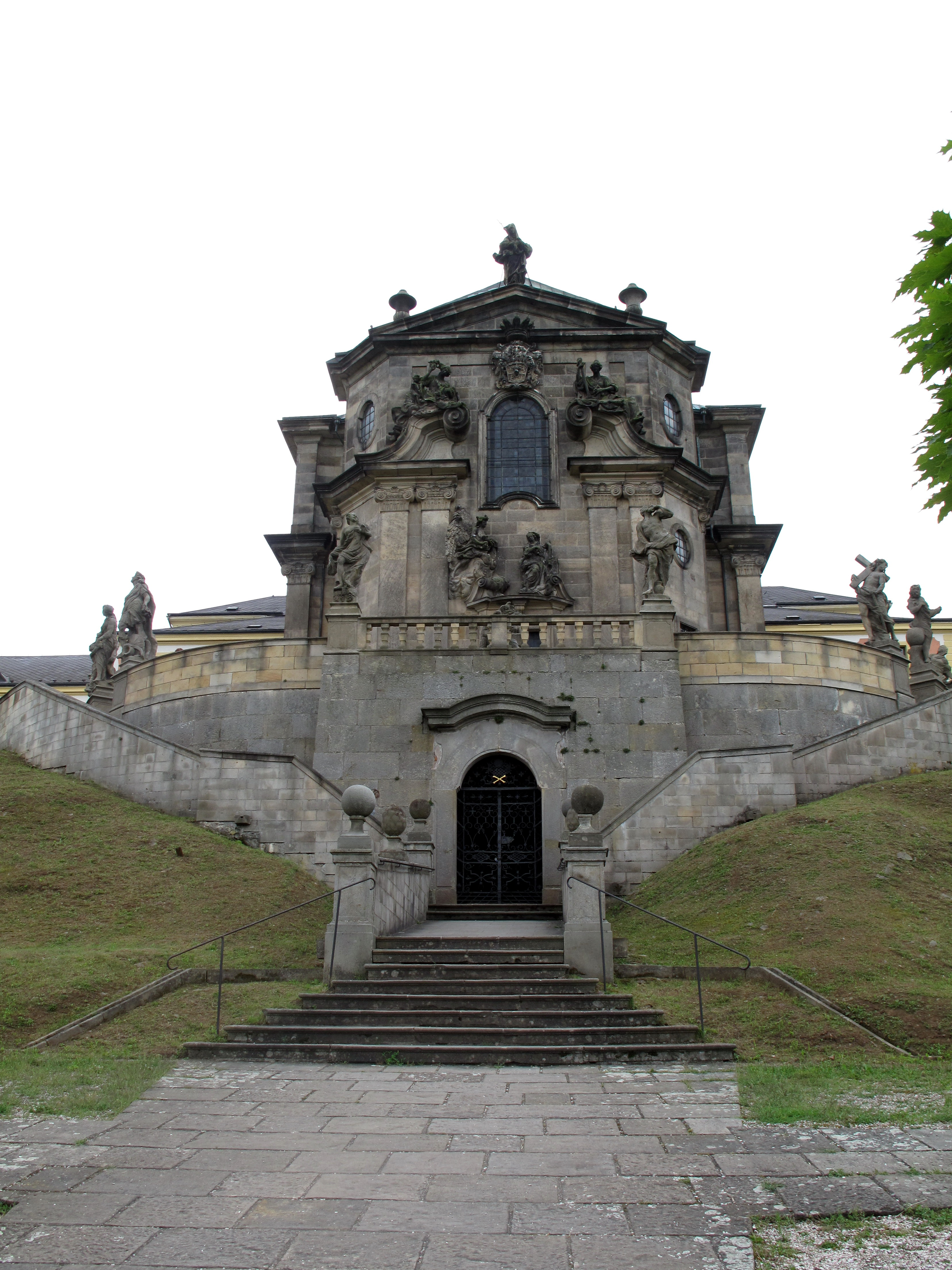
Church of the Holy Trinity and the crypt

The hospital, church, and pharmacy buildings have been preserved, along with historic furnishings, and are considered masterpieces of the Baroque. The complex is nowadays owned by the state. Since 1946, the building of the hospital houses a museum of Baroque art and Czech pharmacy. The urban and architectural complex of the Baroque buildings with the village is protected as a monument reservation.

Braun's exterior sculptures also survive, but have been fast eroding due to the action of water, from rainfall and moisture rising from the ground. For this reason, the Kuks Forest Sculptures were listed in the 2000 World Monuments Watch by the World Monuments Fund.
