= Vincenzo Righini =

Italian opera singer

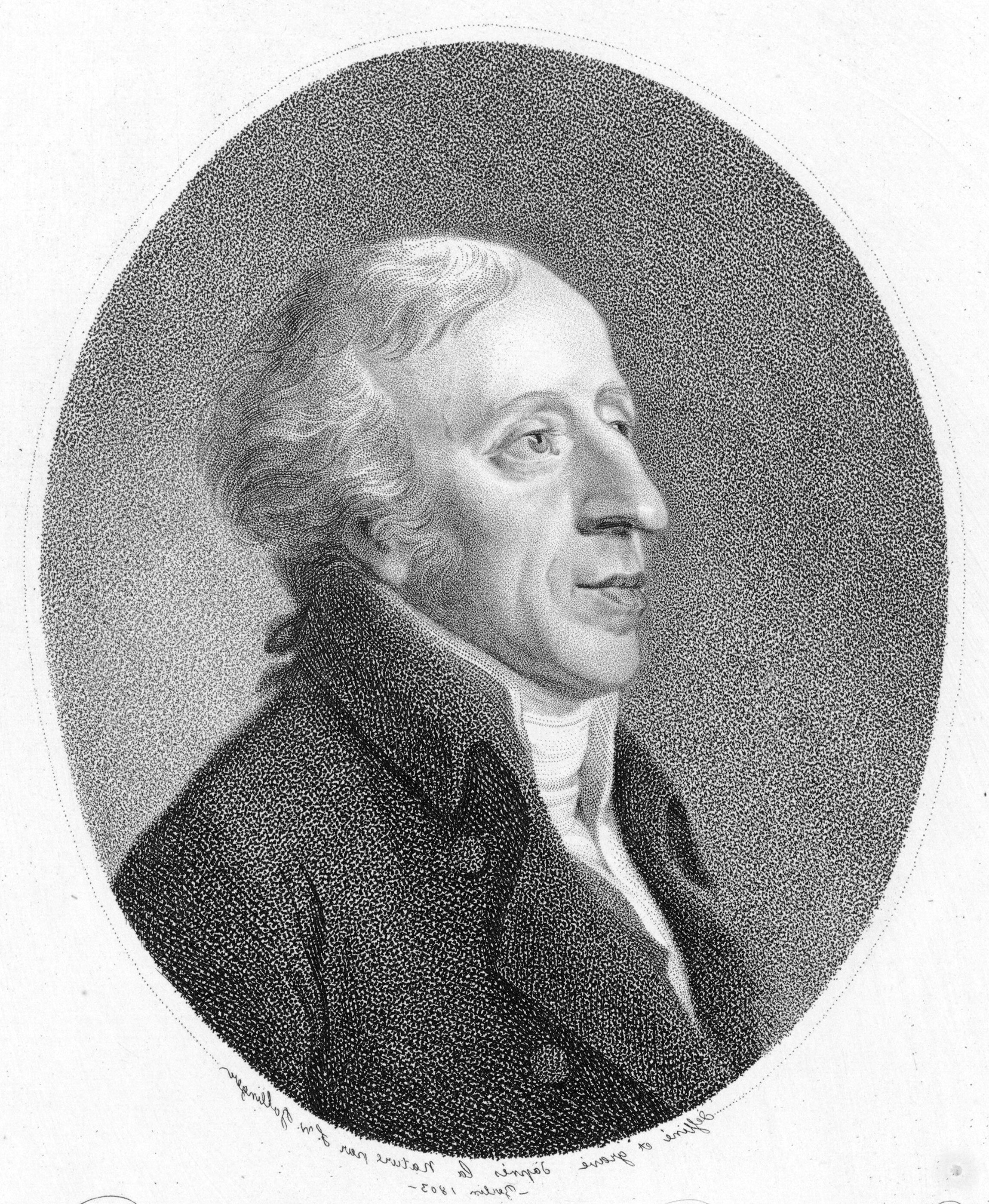
Vincenzo Righini in 1803

Vincenzo Maria Righini (22 January 1756 – 19 August 1812) was an Italian composer, singer and kapellmeister.

== Life and career ==
Righini was born in Bologna and studied singing and composition with Padre Martini in his hometown. Initially, he performed as a singer in Florence (1769) and Rome (1770), however, according to Fétis, he made his debut as a tenor in Parma in 1775. His opera buffa La vedova scaltra, considered his first contribution to musical theatre, was performed in 1774 at the Prague Divadlo v Kotcích. From 1774 to 1777, Righini worked in Prague, as a member of the theatre ensemble of Giuseppe Bustelli. He composed and staged operas to the libretti of Nunziato Porta. At the end of 1777, he moved to Vienna, where he was engaged as a music teacher and composer. His comic operas were often performed in the Burgtheater. In 1787, he replaced Antonio Salieri as the court kapellmeister for a brief period when Salieri was staying in Paris. In 1787, Righini also moved to Mainz, where he became a court kapellmeister of the Electoral orchestra for the elector Friedrich Karl Joseph von Erthal. In March 1793, he was appointed the Royal Prussian court kapellmeister and he led the operation of theatres in Berlin and Potsdam. He also composed grand operas for local theatres, often to the libretti of Antonio De' Filistri. He died in Bologna. Beethoven wrote Vierundzwanzig Variationen über die Ariette „Venni Amore“ von Vincenzo Righini in D-Dur WoO 65.

== Works ==
Righini is the creator of the second 18th-century opera on the theme of Don Juan composed for the Prague stage. He is considered a skillful, but not very original composer, who often took advantage of the innovations of other composers. His Don Juan opera, Il convitato di pietra, was performed in 1997 at the Dejvické divadlo in Prague and in 2003 at the Městské divadlo in Brno.

Selected operas

- La vedova scaltra (1774)
- La bottegha del caffe, ossia Il maldicente (1775)
- Il convitato di pietra, ossia Il dissoluto (1776)
- La Merope(1776)
- Armida (1782)
- L'incontro inaspettato (1785)
- Il Demogorgone ovvero Il filosofo confuso (1786)
- Enea del Lazio (1793)
- Il trionfo d'Arianna (1793)
- Tigrane (1795)
- La selva incantata (1803)
