= Ambleto =

1706 opera

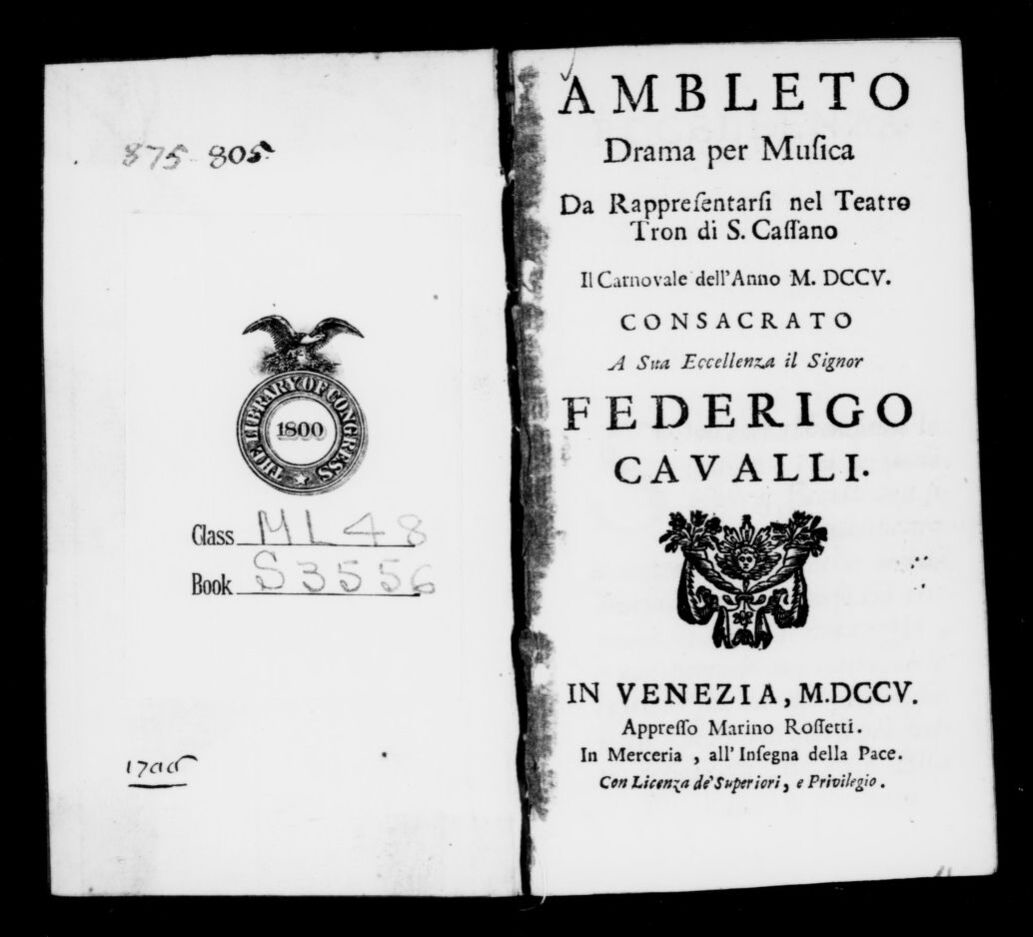
Frontispiece of the libretto for Gasparini's Ambleto

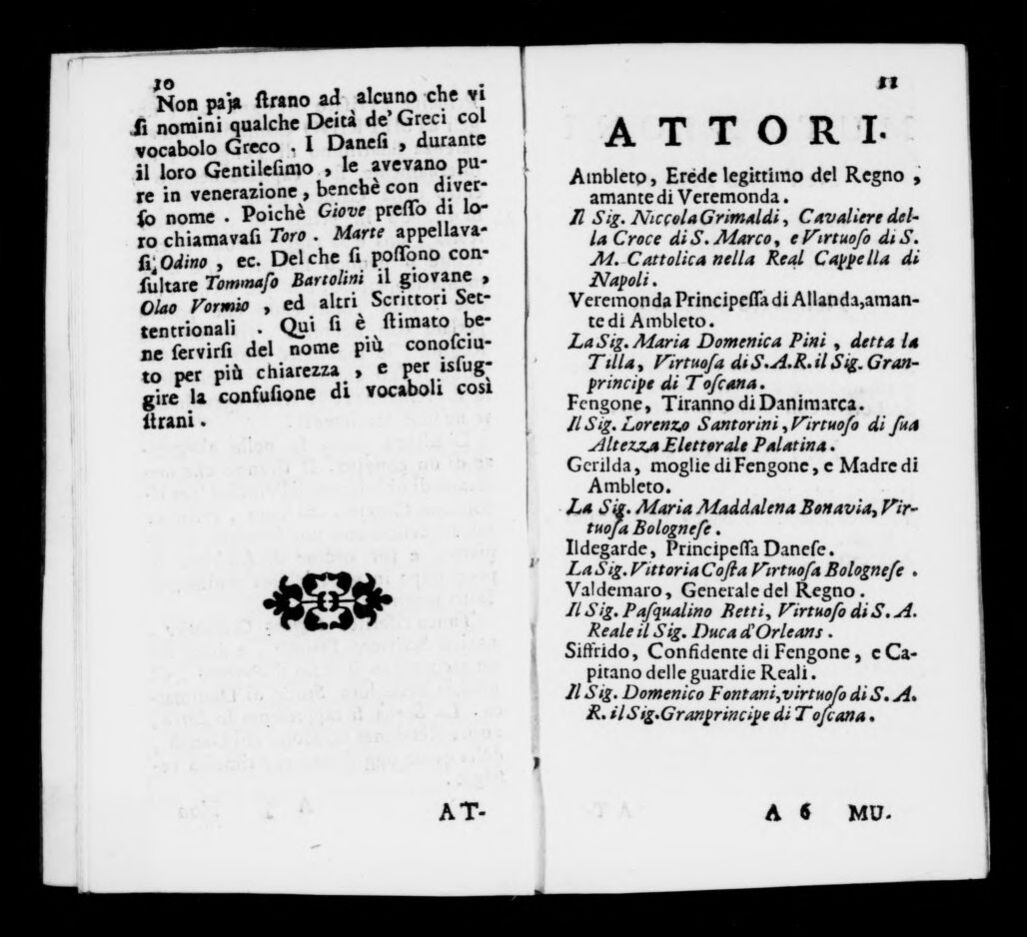
Cast list from the 1706 production of Ambleto

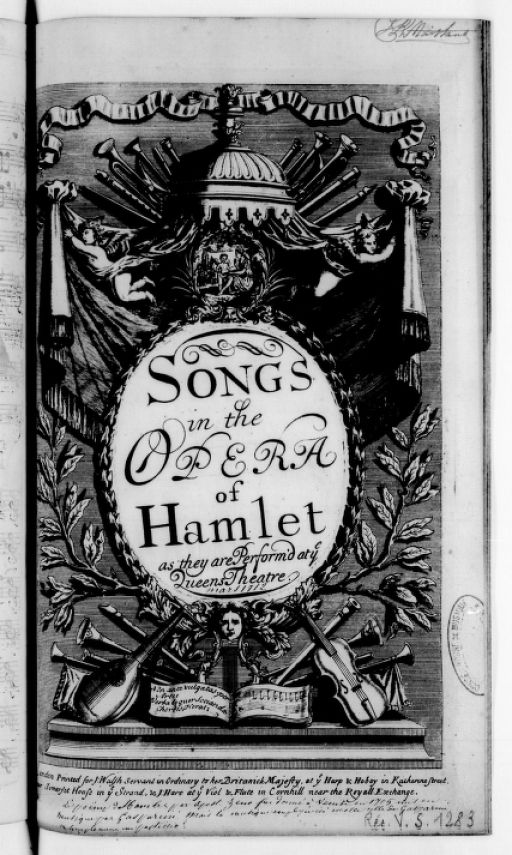
Collection of songs from the 1712 London production of Ambleto

Ambleto is an opera in three acts by Francesco Gasparini with a libretto by Apostolo Zeno and Pietro Pariati. It was first performed at Teatro San Cassiano in Venice for the carnival in 1706. It was possibly one of the earliest operas written on the subject of William Shakespeare's play Hamlet, but uninfluenced by it, and the first in Italian.

== Performance history ==
The original cast was Nicolini i.e. castrato Nicolò Grimaldi (Ambleto), Maria Domenica Pini (Veremonda), Lorenzo Santorini (Fengone), Maria Maddalena Bonavia (Gerilda), Vittoria Costa (Ildegarde), Pasqualino Betti (Valdemaro) and Domenico Fontani (Siffrido).

The opera was performed in Italian at the Haymarket Theatre, London in 1712. A bilingual libretto produced by Jacob Tonson was published at the same time, and a collection of songs from the opera later in the year.

== Shakespeare's Hamlet ==
Zeno and Pariati did not claim to have used Shakespeare's work as their source, and the libretto they created tells a story somewhat different from the English drama. Their stated source is the 13th-century Gesta Danorum by Saxo Grammaticus, which Shakespeare had used for Hamlet. The central idea of the prince feigning madness to exact revenge is retained. However the theme of incest does not appear in Gasparini's work, and the ghost of Ambleto's father likewise does not appear. The prince does not stab the king to death as he does in Shakespeare's play, but makes him captive and sentences him to death.

== See also ==
- Operas based on Hamlet
