= Divadlo v Kotcích =

Former theatre and opera house in Prague, Czech Republic

Coordinates: 50°05′06″N 14°25′19″E

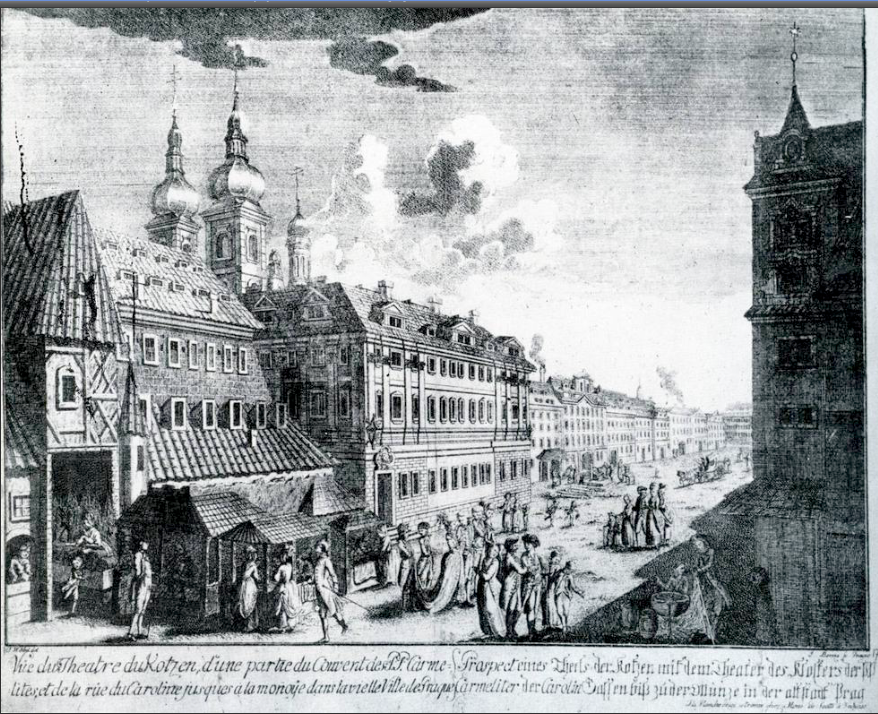
Divadlo v Kotcích

The Divadlo v Kotcích, German Theater an der Kotzen, in English more usually Kotzen Theatre, was a Prague theatre and opera venue on v Kotcích street, which had its heyday from 1739 to 1783 as the second public opera theatre in Prague. Spoken plays and ballets were also presented there.

For many seasons it was run by Italian impresario Santo Lapis, then Giovanni Battista Locatelli, who staged Gluck's Prague Ezio, 1750, and other works. Later impresarios who worked there include Gaetano Molinari and Giuseppe Bustelli. The more correct "Theater an der Kotzen" was often colloquially referred to as the "Kotzentheater," Kotzen being a Slavonic-German term for a market. It closed in 1783 for safety reasons.

It was preceded by the opera theatre of Count Franz Anton von Sporck, which operated between 1724 and 1735, and succeeded by Count Nostitz's "National Theatre," now the Estates Theatre (or "Stavovské divadlo"), which opened on 21 April 1783. The current National Theatre, "Národní divadlo" did not open until 1881.
