= Francesco Borosini =

Italian opera singer

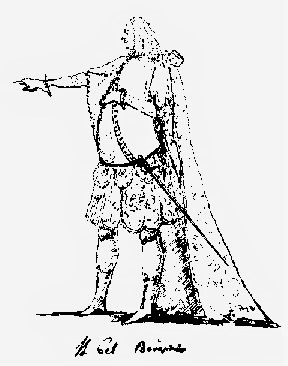
Caricature of Borosini as Bajazet in Handel's Tamerlano

Francesco Borosini (c.1695 – after 1747) was an Italian opera singer. (Note: His surname also appears as "Borosoni", "Borrosini", or "Borseni" in contemporary sources.) Although usually described as a tenor, he had an extraordinarily wide vocal range spanning bass to tenor. He was known not only for the quality of his singing but for his skill as an actor. Borosini created numerous leading roles in the operas of Francesco Bartolomeo Conti and Johann Joseph Fux at the imperial court in Vienna and was the first great Italian tenor to appear in London.

Borosini was born in Modena, Duchy of Modena and Reggio, and was schooled in singing by his father, Antonio Borosini, a tenor and composer active in Venice and Modena who later became a singer at the imperial court in Vienna. Francesco is thought to have made his debut in 1709 in Venice singing in Antonio Lotti's Il vincitor generoso. Like his father, he was appointed as a singer to the Viennese imperial court and performed there from 1711 until 1731 with intermittent sojourns to Italy and London where he worked closely with Handel. He created the role of Bajazet in Handel's Tamerlano, one of several which the composer wrote or rewrote expressly for Borosini's voice. Borosini was married to the soprano Rosa Borosini who often appeared with him in operas and oratorios in Vienna. Rosa retired from singing in 1740 and died in Vienna in 1761. The exact date and place of Francesco's death are unknown.
