= Francesco Gasparini =

Italian composer (1661–1727)

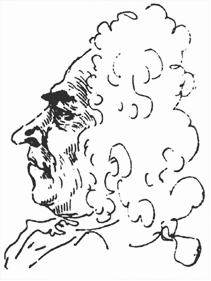
Francesco Gasparini, composer

Francesco Gasparini (19 March 1661 – 22 March 1727) was an Italian Baroque composer and teacher whose works were performed throughout Italy, and also on occasion in the Holy Roman Empire and England.

== Biography ==
Born in Camaiore, near Lucca, he studied in Rome with Corelli and Pasquini. His first important opera, Roderico (1694), was produced there. In 1702, he went to Venice and became one of the leading composers in the city. In 1720, he returned to Rome for his last important work, Tigrane (1724). He wrote the first opera using the story of Hamlet (Ambleto, 1705) though this was not based on Shakespeare's play.

Gasparini was also a teacher, the instructor of Marcello, Quantz and Domenico Scarlatti. He was musical director of the Ospedale della Pietà, where he employed Antonio Vivaldi as a violin master. He wrote a treatise on the harpsichord (1708). At one time, Metastasio was betrothed to his daughter. He died in Rome in 1727.

== Works ==
=== Operas ===
See List of operas by Francesco Gasparini.

=== Other ===
- Missa canonica for four voices and basso continuo (Venice, 1705)

== Reception ==
Gasparini's works were performed throughout Italy, and also on occasion in Germany and England.

=== Missa canonica ===
Gasparini's Missa Canonica was known to Johann Sebastian Bach, who, in 1740, copied it out and—after adding parts for strings, oboes, cornett, trombone, and organ—performed its Kyrie and Gloria in both the St. Thomas Church, Leipzig and St. Nicholas Church, Leipzig.

=== Recordings ===
- Il Vecchio Avaro; Gloria Banditelli - Fiammetta, Antonio Abete - Pancrazio, Il Viaggio Musicale - orchestra, Alessandro Bares - maestro di concerto. Bongiovanni - Bologna GB 2210-2. (1998)
- Dori & Daliso – Mirena & Floro, Auser Musici, Carlo Ipata, director, Symphonia SY 03207 (2004)
- Cantate da Camera a voce e basso continuo – Susanna Rigacci soprano; Gabriele Micheli harpsichord. Tactus TC 660701 (2004)
- Il Bajazet – Auser Musici; Carlo Ipata, director; Giuseppina Bridelli, soprano; Ewa Gubańska, mezzo-soprano; Benedetta Mazzucato, contralto; Giorgia Cincirpi, mezzo-soprano; Antonio Giovanni, countertenor; Filippo Mineccia, countertenor; Raffaele Pè, countertenor; Leonardo De Lisi, tenor. Glossa GCD923504 (2015)
- Arie Sacre -Eleonora Alberici, soprano; Mario Genesi, harpsichord (2007), includes motet "Panis Angelicus" by F. Gasparini
