= List of operas by Josef Mysliveček =

This is a complete list of operas by Josef Mysliveček (1737–1781). All of Mysliveček's operas are examples of opera seria (genre: dramma per musica) and in three acts.

== List ==
Title	Libretto	Date of première	Place, theater
Semiramide	Metastasio	Summer fair, 1766	Bergamo, Teatro di Citadella
Il Bellerofonte	Giuseppe Bonecchi	20 January 1767	Naples, Teatro San Carlo
Farnace	Antonio Maria Lucchini	4 November 1767	Naples, Teatro San Carlo
Il trionfo di Clelia	Metastasio	26 December 1767	Turin, Teatro Regio
Demofoonte (1st version)	Metastasio	17 January 1769	Venice, Teatro San Benedetto
L'Ipermestra	Metastasio	27 March 1769	Florence, Teatro della Pergola
La Nitteti	Metastasio	29 April 1770	Bologna, Teatro Nuovo Pubblico
Motezuma	Vittorio Amedeo Cigna-Santi	23 January 1771	Florence, Teatro della Pergola
Il gran Tamerlano	Agostino Piovene	26 December 1771	Milan, Teatro Regio Ducale
Demetrio (1st version)	Metastasio	24 May 1773	Pavia, Teatro Nuovo
Romolo ed Ersilia	Metastasio	13 August 1773	Naples, Teatro San Carlo
Antigona	Gaetano Roccaforte	26 December 1773	Turin, Teatro Regio
La clemenza di Tito	Metastasio	carnival, 1774, by 5 February 1774	Venice, Teatro San Benedetto
Atide	Tommaso Stanzani, after Philippe Quinault	June 1774, perhaps 13 June	Padua, Teatro Nuovo
Artaserse	Metastasio	13 August 1774	Naples, Teatro San Carlo
Demofoonte (2nd version)	Metastasio	20 January 1775	Naples, Teatro San Carlo
Ezio (1st version)	Metastasio	30 May 1775	Naples, Teatro San Carlo
Adriano in Siria	Metastasio	8 September 1776	Florence, Teatro del Cocomero
Ezio (2nd version)	Metastasio	1777	Munich, Hoftheater
La Calliroe	Mattia Verazi	30 May 1778	Naples, Teatro San Carlo
L'Olimpiade	Metastasio	4 November 1778	Naples, Teatro San Carlo
La Circe	Domenico Perelli	12 May 1779	Venice, Teatro San Benedetto
Demetrio (2nd version)	Metastasio	13 August 1779	Naples, Teatro San Carlo
Armida	Giovanni Ambrogio Migliavacca, after Philippe Quinault and Torquato Tasso	26 December 1779	Milan, Teatro alla Scala
Medonte	Giovanni de Gamerra	26 January 1780	Rome, Teatro Argentina
Antigono	Metastasio	5 April 1780	Rome, Teatro delle Dame

Note: There is no reason to believe that any of the following productions cited in earlier musicological literature ever took place: Medea (Parma, 1764); Erifile (Munich, 1773); Achille in Sciro (Naples, 1775); and Merope (Naples, 1775). Furthermore, there is no reason to believe that Mysliveček contributed any music to a production of Armida that took place in Lucca in 1778. The cantata Il Parnaso confuso is sometimes referred to in error as Mysliveček's first opera. Reports that it was performed in Parma in 1765 are conjectural; there is no documentation to verify its true date of composition or the venue of its first performance.

== Recordings ==
- Opera Medonte. L'Arte del Mondo. dir. Werner Ehrhardt, Deutsche Harmonia Mundi, 2011
- Opera Il Bellerofonte. Prague Chamber Orchestra dir. Zoltán Peskó, Supraphon, 2003
- Opera L'Olimpiade. Orchestra of the Teatro Comunale di Bologna dir. Oliver von Dohnányi, conductor, Naxos (2014)
