= Ipermestra (Mysliveček) =

Opera by Josef Mysliveček

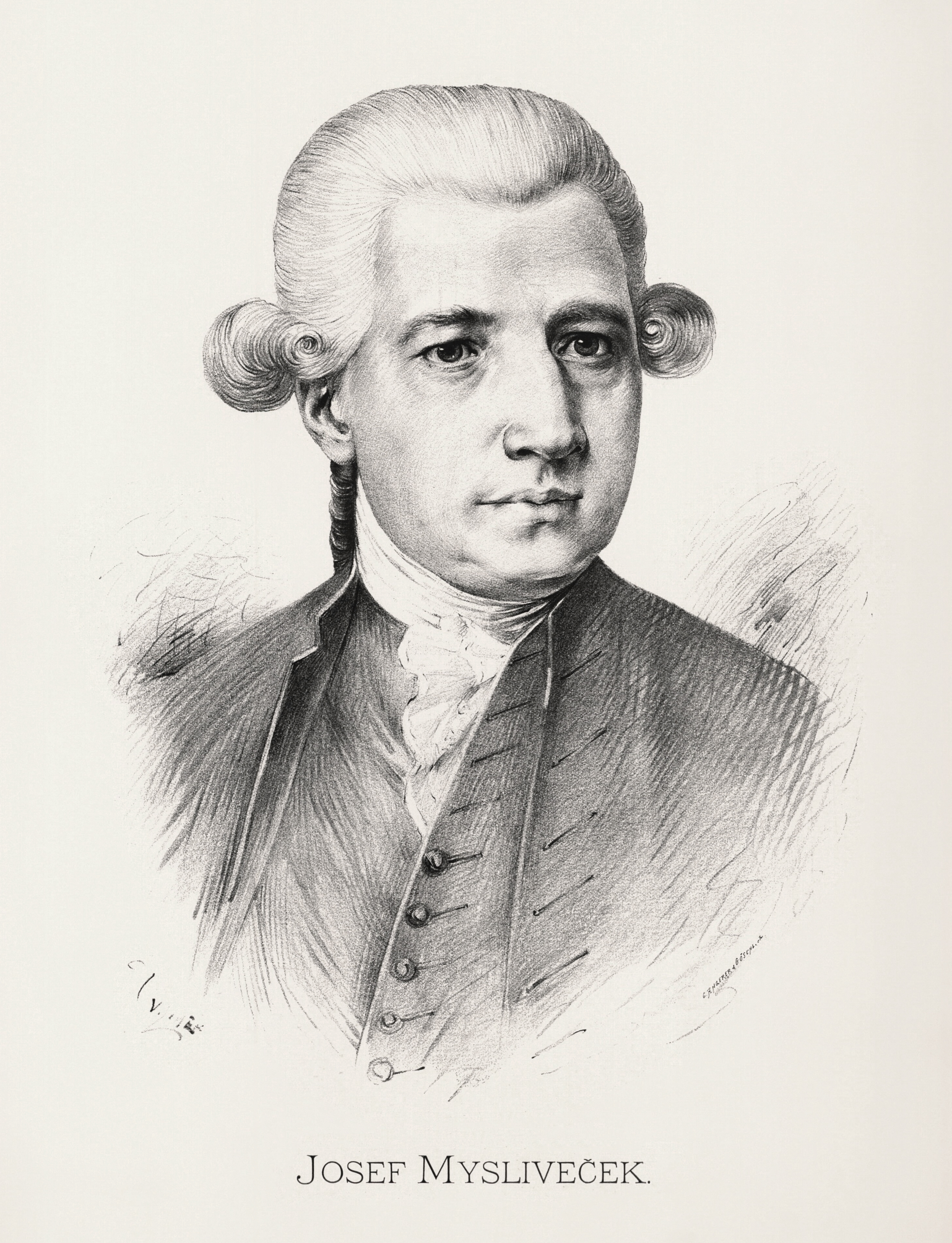
Josef Mysliveček

L'Ipermestra is an 18th-century Italian opera in 3 acts by the Czech composer Josef Mysliveček composed to the libretto Ipermestra by the Italian poet Metastasio first set by Hasse in 1744. This opera (and all the rest of Mysliveček's operas) belongs to the serious type in Italian language referred to as opera seria that would usually feature the designation dramma per musica in librettos.

== Performance history ==
The opera was first performed at the Teatro della Pergola in Florence on 17 March 1769. Florence had been a frequent stopping-place for Mysliveček after he arrived in Italy from Prague in 1763, but L'Ipermestra was the first dramatic work that he succeeded in getting produced there. Later there would be two other operas (Motezuma in 1771 and Adriano in Siria in 1776) and three oratorios (Adamo ed Eva in 1771, La passione in 1773, and Isacco figura del redentore in 1776). The production was graced with the presence of the great German tenor Anton Raaff, a close friend and professional associate of the composer who contributed greatly to the success of Mysliveček's break-through opera, Il Bellerofonte of 1767. L'Ipermestra was first revived in modern times in a concert version performed in Brno in 1970, then a staged version in the same city performed in 1986. As a unique showpiece for Raaff, the opera includes a highly unusual aria with extended obbligato solos for basset horn (clarinet pitched in F): "Ah, di calma un sol momento," the last aria in the opera. The use of basset horns in orchestral ensembles was only in its infancy at this time, the earliest appearances documented only starting circa 1760. The appearance of basset horn in Mysliveček's Ipermestrais the first known example of the instrument being introduced into an opera aria in Italy.

== Roles ==
Role	Voice type	Premiere cast, 17 March 1769, Teatro della Pergola, Florence
Danao, king of Argos	tenor	Anton Raaff
Ipermestra, daughter of Danao, lover of Linceo	soprano	Elisabetta Teuber
Linceo, prince of Egypt, lover of Ipermestra	soprano castrato	Adamo Solzi
Elpinice, niece of Danao, lover of Plistene	soprano	Daniella Mienci
Plestene, prince of Thessaly, lover of Elpinice, friend of Linceo	alto castrato	Giuseppe Cicognani
Adrasto, confidant of Danao	soprano castrato	Filippo Bertocchini

== Vocal set pieces ==
Act I, scene 1 - Aria of Elpinice, "Abbiam penato, è ver"
Act I, scene 2 - Aria of Danao, "Pensa che figlia sei"
Act I, scene 3 - Aria of Ipermestra, "Ah, non parlar d'amore"
Act I, scene 4 - Aria of Linceo, "Di pena sì forte"
Act I, scene 6 - Aria of Plistene, "Ma rendi pur contento"
Act I, scene 9 - Aria of Ipermestra, "Se pietà da voi non trovo"
Act I, scene 10 - Aria of Linceo, "Io non pretendo, o stelle"

Act II, scene 1 - Aria of Adrasto, "Pria di lasciar la sponda"
Act II, scene 2 - Aria of Danao, "Non hai cor per un'impresa"
Act II, scene 3 - Aria of Ipermestra, "Se il mio duol, se i mali miei"
Act II, scene 5 - Aria of Linceo, "Gonfio tu vedi il fiume"
Act II, scene 6 - Aria of Plistene, "Vuoi ch'io lasci, o mio tesoro" [a non-Metastasian text]
Act II, scene 7 - Aria of Elpinice, "Mai l'amor mio verace"
Act II, scene 9 - Aria of Danao, "Or del tuo ben la sorte"
Act II, scene 10 - Accompanied recitative for Ipermestra and Linceo, "Ferma, oimè"
Act II, scene 10 - Duet of Ipermestra and Linceo, "Ah, se di te mi privi"

Act III, scene 2 - Aria of Ipermestra, "Và, più non dirmi infida"
Act III, scene 4 - Aria of Linceo, "Nel pensar che l'idol mio"
Act III, scene 7 - Aria of Danao, "Ah, di calma un sol momento" [a non-Metastasian text]
