= La clemenza di Tito (Mysliveček) =

Opera by Josef Mysliveček

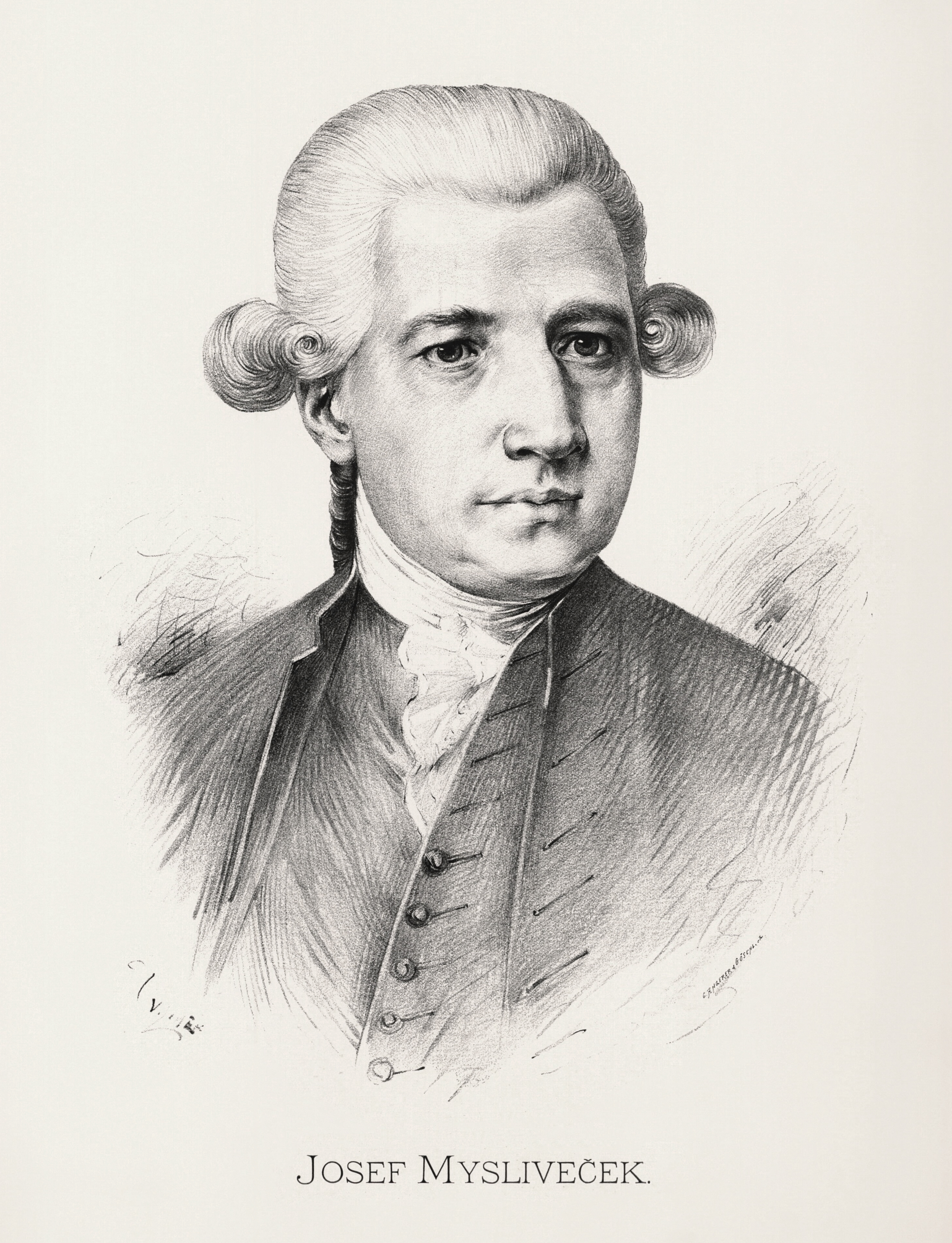
Josef Mysliveček

La clemenza di Tito ("The Clemency of Titus") is an 18th-century Italian opera in 3 acts by the Czech composer Josef Mysliveček. It was composed to a libretto by the Italian poet Metastasio that was first performed in Vienna in 1734 with music of Antonio Caldara. For a performance in the 1770s, it would only be expected that a libretto of such age would be abbreviated and altered to suit contemporary operatic taste (similar to the setting of the same text by Wolfgang Amadeus Mozart). The cuts and changes in the text made for the 1774 performance of Mysliveček's opera are not attributable. All of Mysliveček's operas are of the serious type in Italian language referred to as opera seria and would usually feature the designation dramma per musica in librettos. Between the 1740s and 1760s, the Metastasio text of 1734 was set with some frequency, but the Mysliveček setting was the last one prepared for a public opera theater before the Mozart setting of 1791.

== Performance history ==
The opera was first performed at the Teatro San Benedetto in Venice for the carnival season of 1774, no later than 5 February. In spite of a distinguished cast, the production was one of the composer's few operatic failures, perhaps due to the pressure of composing music for two different operas during the same operatic season (he also provided music for Antigona for Turin during the same carnival operatic season). The production was also disrupted by a fire in the Teatro San Benedetto that was reported in the Venetian press.

== Roles ==
Roles, voice types, premiere cast
Roles	Voice type	Premiere cast, by 5 February 1774
Tito Vespasiano, emperor of Rome	tenor	Giovanni Ansani
Vitellia, daughter of the emperor Vitellio	soprano	Caterina Schindler
Servilia, sister of Sesto, in love with Annio	soprano	Maria Anna Schindler
Sesto, friend of Tito, in love with Vitellia	soprano castrato	Pietro Benedetti
Annio, friend of Sesto, in love with Servilia	soprano castrato	Antonio Solari
Publio, prefect of the Praetorian guards	tenor	Giacomo Fantoni

== Synopsis ==
18th-century Italian operas in serious style are almost always set in a distant or legendary past and are built around historical, pseudo-historical, or mythological characters. Metastasio preferred to craft dramas on incidents from the lives of genuine historical characters who once lived in the ancient Mediterranean world, or in Asia. This drama is based on the emperor Titus of Rome, who ruled between 79 and 81 AD., and concocts a story surrounding a fictitious daughter of the dead emperor Vitellius, who was murdered after ruling for only a few months in the year 69 AD.

Vitellia, daughter of deposed emperor Vitellio, wants revenge against Tito and incites Tito's vacillating friend Sesto, who is in love with her, to act against him. But when she hears word that Tito has sent Berenice, of whom she was jealous, back to Jerusalem, Vitellia tells Sesto to delay carrying out her wishes with the hope that Tito will choose her (Vitellia) as his empress.

Tito, however, decides to choose Sesto's sister Servilia to be his empress, and orders Annio (Sesto's friend) to bear the message to Servilia. Since Annio and Servilia are in love, this news is very unwelcome to both. Servilia decides to tell Tito the truth, but also says that if Tito still insists on marrying her, she will obey. Tito thanks the gods for Servilia's truthfulness and immediately forswears the idea of coming between her and Annius.

In the meantime, Vitellia has heard the news about Tito's interest in Servilia and is again boiling with jealousy. She urges Sesto to assassinate Titus. He agrees. Almost as soon as he leaves, Annio and the guard Publio arrive to escort Vitellia to Tito, who has now chosen her as his empress. She is torn with feelings of guilt and worry over what she has sent Sesto to do.

Sesto, meanwhile, is at the Capitol wrestling with his conscience as he and his accomplices prepare to burn it down. The other characters (except Tito) react with horror to the burning Capitol. Sesto reenters and announces that he saw Tito slain, but Vitellia stops him from incriminating himself as the assassin.

Annio tells Sesto that Emperor Tito is in fact alive and has just been seen; in the smoke and chaos, Sesto mistook someone else for Titus. Soon Publio arrives to arrest Sesto, bearing the news that it was one of Sesto's co-conspirators who dressed himself in Tito's robes and was stabbed, though not mortally, by Sesto. The Senate tries Sesto as Tito waits impatiently, certain that his friend will be exonerated; but the Senate finds him guilty, and an anguished Tito must sign Sesto's death warrant.

Tito decides to send for Sesto first, attempting to obtain further details about the plot. Sesto puts all responsibility on himself and says he deserves death. Tito tells him he will have it and sends him away. But after an extended internal struggle, Tito tears up the death warrant for Sesto and determines that, if the world wishes to accuse him of anything, it can charge him with showing too much mercy rather than with having a vengeful heart.

Vitellia at this time is torn by guilt and decides to confess all to Tito, giving up her hopes of empire. In the amphitheater, the condemned (including Sesto) are waiting to be thrown to wild beasts. Tito is about to show mercy when Vitellia offers her confession as the instigator of Sesto's plot. Though shocked, the emperor includes her in the general clemency he offers. The opera concludes with all the subjects praising the extreme generosity of Titus, while he himself asks that the gods cut short his days when he ceases to care for the good of Rome. Marriages are proclaimed between Vitellia and Sesto and between Annio and Servilia.

== Vocal set pieces ==
- Act 1, scene 2 – Aria of Vitellia, "Deh, se piacer mi vuoi"
- Act 1, scene 4 – Aria of Sesto, "Opprimete i contumaci"
- Act 1, scene 6 – Aria of Annio, "Ah, perdona al primo affetto"
- Act 1, scene 7 – Aria of Servilia, "Amo te solo"
- Act 1, scene 9 – Aria of Tito, "Ah, se fosse intorno al trono"
- Act 1, scene 11 – Duet of Vitellia and Sesto, "Parto, ma tu, ben mio"
- Act 2, scene 1 – Aria of Publio, "Sta lontano ogni cimento"
- Act 2, scene 1 – Aria of Servilia, "Almen, se non poss'io"
- Act 2, scene 2 – Aria of Vitellia, "Come potesti, oh Dio"
- Act 2, scene 7 – Aria of Tito, "Tu infedel non hai difese"
- Act 2, scene 8 – Aria of Annio, "Ch'io parto reo, lo vedi"
- Act 2, scene 10 – Aria of Sesto, "Se mai senti spirarti sul volto"
- Act 2, scene 11 – Aria of Vitellia, "Tremo fra' dubbi miei"
- Act 3, scene 3 – Aria of Sesto, "Non chiedo perdono" [a non-Metastasian text]
- Act 3, scene 5 – Aria of Tito, "Se all'impero, amici dei"
- Act 3, scene 8 – Aria of Vitellia, "Se vado, oh Dio, a tui" [a non-Mestastasian text]
