= Giovanni Ansani =

Italian opera singer (1744–1826)

Giovanni Ansani (11 or 20 February 1744 – 15 July 1826) was an Italian tenor and composer.

== Life and career ==
Giovanni Ansani was born in Rome, Italy on either 11 or 20 February 1744. In 1770, he was singing at Copenhagen. About 1780 he came to London, where he at once took the first place; but, being of a most quarrelsome temper, he threw up his engagement on account of squabbles with soprano castrato Francesco Roncaglia. He returned the next year with his wife, Maccherini, who was not successful. He sang at Florence in 1784, at Rome the autumn of the same year, and elsewhere in Italy; and finally retired to Naples at the age of 50, where he devoted himself to teaching singing.

English music historian Dr. Charles Burney wrote that "[]Ansani] possessed one of the most powerful and sweetest voices he ever heard"; composer Carlo Gervasoni noted that his tenor commanded a "very rare truth of intonation, great power of expression."

Ansani was known also as a composer of duets and trios for soprano and bass, with a basso continuo. Ernst Ludwig Gerber reported that an opera of his composition, called La Vendetta di Minos, was performed at Florence in 1791.

Giovanni Ansani died in Florence, Italy on 15 July 1826.

== Operatic roles ==
- Clistene in an anonymous L'Olimpiade (Pisa, 1764)
- Astiage in an anonymous Ciro riconosciuto (Pisa, 1764)
- Lucio Vero in Vologeso re dei Parti by Giovanni Masi (Città di Castello, 1766)
- Massimo in Ezio by Niccolò Jommelli (Bologna, 1768)
- Fenicio in Demetrio by Antonio Pampani (Venice, 1768)
- Ircano in Semiramide riconosciuto by Josef Mysliveček (Prague, 1768)
- Farnace in Farnace by Josef Mysliveček (Prague, 1769)
- Alessandro in Alessandro nell'Indie by Jan Antonín Koželuh (Prague, 1769)
- Decebalo in Eurione by Ferdinando Bertoni (Udine, 1770)
- Demofoonte in Demofoonte by Giuseppe Sarti (Copenhagen, 1771)
- Enea in Didone abbandonata by Giuseppe Sarti (Copenhagen, 1771)
- Alessandro in Alessandro by Giuseppe Sarti (Copenhagen, 1771)
- Unidentifiable role in Il gran Tamerlano by Giuseppe Sarti (Copenhagen, 1772)
- Unidentifiable role in Olimpiade by Giuseppe Sarti (Copenhagen, 1772)
- Dioneo in Uranio e Erasitea by Giuseppe Colla (Parma, 1773)
- Rodoaldo in Ricimero by Luigi Borghi (Venice, 1773)
- Tito Vespasiano in La clemenza di Tito by Josef Mysliveček (Venice, 1774)
- Danao in Ipermestra by Johann Gottlieb Naumann (Venice, 1774)
- Lucio Silla in Lucio Silla by Pasquale Anfossi (Venice, 1774)
- Licastro in Atide by Josef Mysliveček (Padua, 1774)
- Medonte in Medonte re di Epiro by Felice Alessandri (Milan, 1775)
- Alessandro in Alessandro nell'Indie by Carlo Monza (Milan, 1775)
- Ubaldo in Rinaldo by Antonio Tozzi (Venice, 1775)
- Creonte in Antigona by Ferdinando Bertoni (Alessandria, 1775)
- Niso in Aurora by Gaetano Pugnani (Turin, 1775)
- Lucio Vero in Vologeso by Giovanni Masi (Rome, 1776)
- Dario in La disfatta di Dario by Giovanni Paisiello (Rome, 1776)
- Unidentifiable role in Artaserse by Ferdinando Bertoni (Forlì, 1776)
- Unidentifiable role in Demofoonte by Joseph Schuster (Forlì, 1776)
- Dario in La disfatta di Dario by Giovanni Paisiello (Florence, 1776)
- Osroa in Adriano in Siria by Josef Mysliveček (Florence, 1776)
- Osroa in the pasticcio Adriano in Siria (Livorno, 1777)
- Dario in the pasticcio La disfatta di Dario (Livorno, 1777)
- Dario in La disfatta di Dario by Giovanni Paisiello (Livorno, 1777)
- Rodoaldo in Ricimero by Pietro Guglielmi (Naples, 1777)
- Dario in La disfatta di Dario by Giovanni Paisiello (Naples, 1777)
- Catone in Catone in Utica by Bernardino Ottani (Naples, 1777)
- Enea in Enea in Cuma by Niccolò Antonio Zingarelli (Naples, 1778)
- Ariobate in Bellerofonte by Ignazio Platania (Naples, 1778)
- Agricano in La Calliroe by Josef Mysliveček (Naples, 1778)
- Alessandro in Il re pastore by Ignazio Platania (Naples, 1778)
- Clistene in L'Olimpiade by Josef Mysliveček (Naples, 1778)
- Agamennone in Ifigenia in Aulide by Vicente Martín y Soler (Naples, 1779)
- Agricano in La Calliroe by Josef Mysliveček (Pontremoli, 1779)
- Caio Mario in the anonymous Caio Mario (Pontremoli, 1779)
- Agricano in La Calliroe by Josef Mysliveček (Pisa, 1779)
- Cajo Mario in the anonymous Cajo Mario (Pisa, 1779)
- Sabino in L'Epponina by Giuseppe Giordani (Florence, 1779)
- Emirena in Tito nelle Gallie by Pasquale Anfossi (Rome, 1780)
- Cajo Mario in Cajo Mario by Domenico Cimarosa (Rome, 1780)
- Antigono in Antigono by Josef Mysliveček (Rome, 1780)
- Lucio Vero in Vologeso by Giacomo Rust (Rome, 1780)
- Ricimero in the anonymous Ricimero (London, 1780)
- Ubaldo in Rinaldo by Antonio Sacchini (London, 1780)
- Massimo in the anonymous Ezio (London, 1781)
- Giunio Bruto in the anonymous Giunio Bruto (London, 1782)
- Lucio Papirio in Quinto Fabio by Ferdinando Bertoni (London, 1782)
- Leango in L'eroe cinese by Venanzio Rauzzini (London, 1782)
- Agamennone in Ifigenia in Aulide by Ferdinando Bertoni (London, 1782)
- Ariodante in the anonymous L'Artenice (Genoa, 1783)
- Learco in Erifile by Giuseppe Giordani (Genoa, 1783)
- Acomate in L'Acomate by Giuseppe Giordani (Genoa, 1783)
- Ataliba in the anonymous Pizzarro nell'Indie (Livorno, 1783)
- Ataliba in Pizzarro nell'Indie by Giuseppe Giordani (Florence, 1784)
- Acomate in L'Acomate by Giuseppe Giordani (Florence, 1784)
- Ataliba in Pizzarro nell'Indie by Giuseppe Giordani (Verona, 1784)
- Medonte in Medonte, re di Epiro by Giuseppe Sarti (Verona, 1784)
- Giunio Bruto in Giunio Bruto by Luigi Caruso (Rome, 1785)
- Mitridate in Mitridate re di Ponto by Angelo Tarchi (Rome, 1785)
- Medonte in the anonymous Medonte (Modena, 1785)
- Medonte in Medonte, re di Epiro by Giuseppe Sarti (Reggio Emilia, 1785)
- Caio Mario in the anonymous Caio Mario (Florence, 1785)
- Arsace in La vendetta di Nino by Alessio Prati (Florence, 1786)
- Medonte in Medonte, re di Epiro by Giuseppe Sarti (Trieste, 1786)
- Medonte in Medonte, re di Epiro by Giuseppe Sarti (Padua, 1786)
- Sarabes in Zemira by Francesco Bianchi (Padua, 1786)
- Arsace in La vendetta di Nino by Alessio Prati (Senigallia, 1786)
- Arsace in La vendetta di Nino by Alessio Prati (Lucca, 1788)
- Medonte in Arsace by Pietro Alessandro Guglielmi (Venice, 1788)
- Ubaldo in Rinaldo by Pietro Alessandro Guglielmi (Venice, 1788)
- Demetrio in Demetrio a Rodi by Gaetano Pugnani (Turin, 1789)
- Teseo in Teseo a Stige by Sebastiano Nasolini (Florence, 1790)
- Arsace in La vendetta di Nino by Alessio Prati (Florence, 1790)
- Teseo in Teseo a Stige by Sebastiano Nasolini (Florence, 1791)
- Pirro in Pirro by Giovanni Paisiello (Florence, 1791)
- Cenèo in Atalanta by Giuseppe Giordano (Turin, 1791)
- Annibale in Annibale in Torino by Niccolò Antonio Zingarelli (Turin, 1792)
- Pirro in Pirro by Giovanni Paisiello (Reggio Emilia, 1792)
- Arsace in La vendetta di Nino by Alessio Prati (Livorno, 1792)
- Arsace in La vendetta di Nino by Alessio Prati (Reggio Emilia, 1793)
- Arsace in La vendetta di Nino by Alessio Prati (Modena, 1793)
- Alberto in the anonymous Margherita di Valdemar, regina di Danimarca (Florence, 1793)
- Sesostri in Le feste d'Iside by Sebastiano Nasolini (Florence, 1794)
- Sesostri in Le feste d'Iside by Sebastiano Nasolini (Reggio Emilia, 1795)
- Saul in L'ombra di Samuele by Giuseppe Aloisi (Florence, 1796)
