= Atide =

Opera by Josef Mysliveček

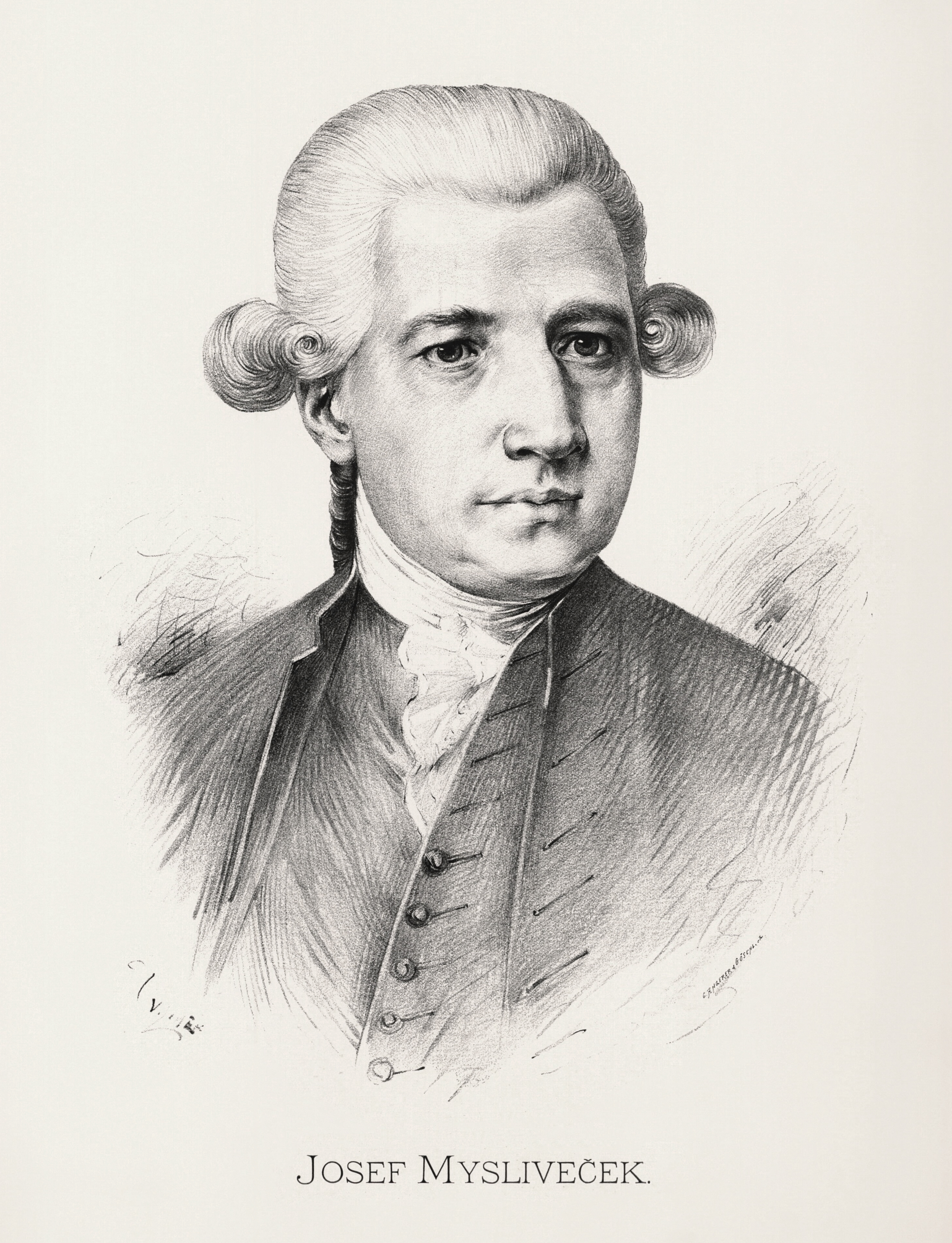
Josef Mysliveček

Atide is an opera in three acts by Josef Mysliveček set to a libretto by Tommaso Stanzani that is based on Greek legends about Atys, an ancient king of Lydia. Stanzani's libretto is based on an earlier libretto by Tommaso Stanzani that was originally set by Giuseppe Felice Tosi, Pietro degli Antoni and Giacomo Antonio Perti for Bologna in 1679 (Jean-Baptiste Lully's Atys tells a different story). The opera Atide (and all the rest of Mysliveček's operas) belong to the serious type in Italian language referred to as opera seria and would usually feature the designation dramma per musica in librettos.

== Performance history ==
The opera was first performed at the Teatro Nuovo in Padua in June 1774, probably on 13 June, the Feast of St. Anthony of Padua. It constitutes the last record of the composer's association with the city of Padua, an association that produced three oratorios and a brilliant series of violin concertos. The composer's intense period of activity as an opera composer during the year 1774 is reflected in his use of a pre-existent overture and several pre-existent arias to fill out Atide. For an operatic center as provincial as Padua, he seems not to have wanted to take greater care. The cast was one of the least distinguished (and smallest) that he composed for after he established his reputation in Naples in 1767 with Il Bellerofonte. There is no information available concerning the reception of his opera in Padua.

== Recording ==
Aria "Affanni di quest'alma" in Arias for Giovanni Rubinelli, Filippo Mineccia, alto, with Istante Collective, Harmonia Mundi Musique, 2026.

== Roles ==
Role	Voice type	Premiere cast June 1774 Teatro Nuovo, Padua
Atide, King of Lydia, promised in marriage to Esione, then lover of Erissena	soprano castrato	Michele Neri
Adrasto, Prince of Phrygia, lover of Erissena	alto castrato	Giovanni Rubinelli
Erissena, daughter of Licastro, lover of Adrasto	soprano	Angela Galliani
Licastro, King of Lycia, father of Erissena	tenor	Giovanni Ansani
Esione, hereditary princess of the kingdom of Cilicia, promised in marriage to Atide	soprano	Anna Benvenuti

== Vocal set pieces ==
Act I, scene 1 – Aria of Atide, "Sazio di stragi e morte"
Act I, scene 2 – Aria of Adrasto, "Se incerta ti lascio"
Act I, scene 5 – Aria of Esione, "Alma grande, alma regale"
Act I, scene 6 – Aria of Erissena, "Lasciami adesso in pace"
Act I, scene 9 – Aria of Licastro, "Chi d'un l'eterno affetto"
Act I, scene 11 – Accompanied recitative for Adrasto, "Ah, chi provò del mio più acerbo affanno"
Act I, scene 11 – Aria of Adrasto, "Affanni di quest'alma"

Act II, scene 1 – Aria of Atide, "Da quei vezzosa"
Act II, scene 2 – Aria of Erissena, "Sento nell'alma mia"
Act II, scene 3 – Aria of Licastro, "Prence, che affanno"
Act II, scene 4 – Aria of Adrasto, "Serbo infelice in seno"
Act II, scene 5 – Aria of Esione, "Quel traditore intendo"
Act II, scene 8 – Aria of Licastro, "Figlia, ti lascio"
Act II, scene 9 – Duet of Erissena and Adrasto, "Ah che nel dirti addio"

Act III, scene 3 – Aria of Adrasto, "Amo si dolce oggetto"
Act III, scene 4 – Accompanied recitative of Erissena, "Ecco mi giunta al fine"
Act III, scene 4 – Aria of Erissena, "Vado crudel tiranno"
Act III, scene 5 – Chorus, "Cessi l'antico sdegno"
