= Demofoonte (Mysliveček, 1775) =

Opera by Josef Mysliveček (1775)

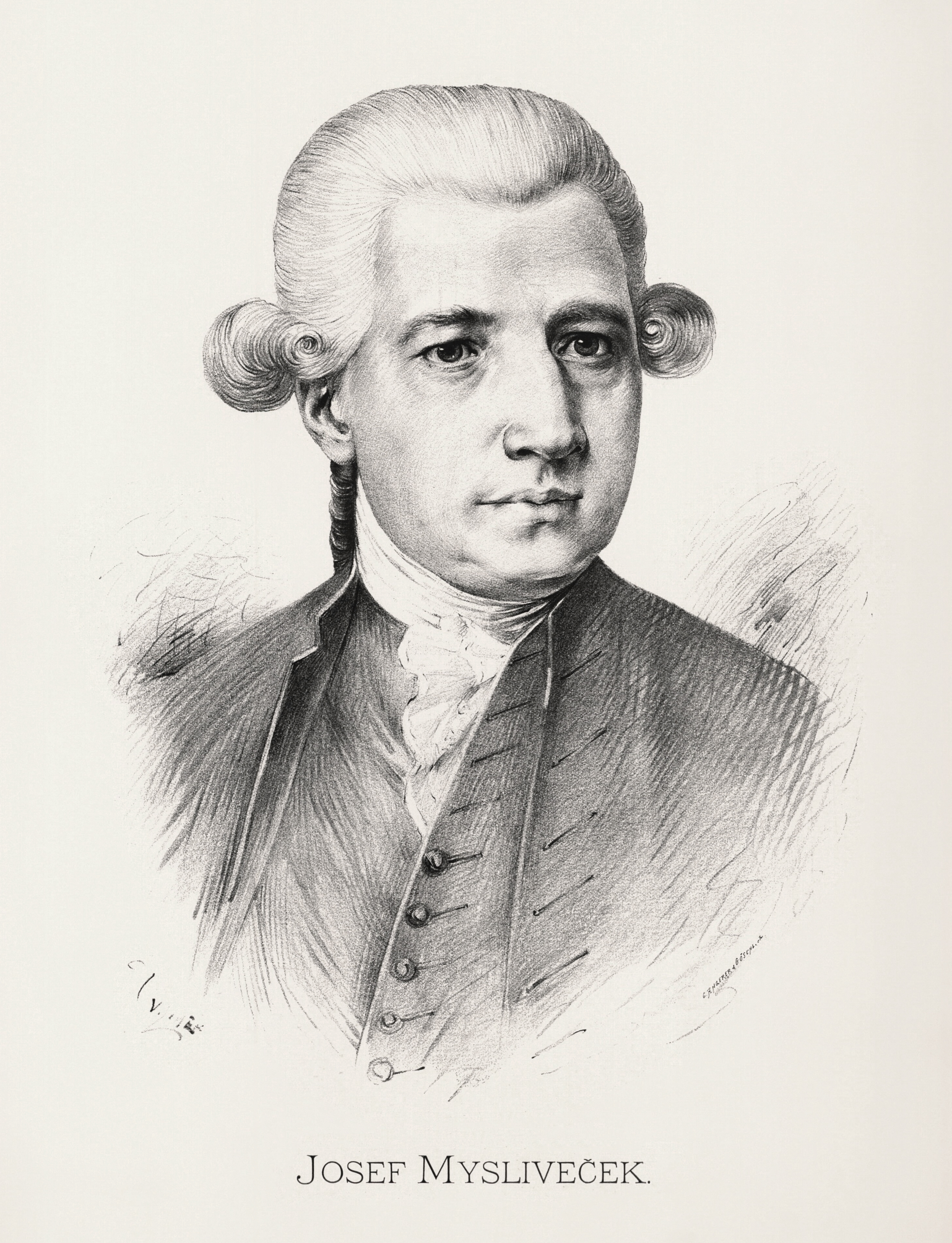
Josef Mysliveček

Demofoonte is an opera in three acts by the Czech composer Josef Mysliveček. It was the composer's second setting of a popular libretto by Metastasio first produced in 1733 with music by Antonio Caldara that was set dozens of times over during the eighteenth century. It was typical for subsequent setting of Metastasian dramas to incorporate significant alterations, and this setting retains the augmentation of the role of Timante that is found in the composer's first setting of this text (for the Teatro San Benedetto in 1769). All of Mysliveček's operas are of the serious type in Italian referred to as opera seria that usually featured the designation dramma per musica in librettos.

== Performance history ==
The opera was first performed at the Teatro San Carlo in Naples on 20 January 1775, the birthday of king Charles III of Spain, the former ruler of the Kingdom of Naples whose birthday and nameday were still celebrated with operatic productions under the rule of his son Ferdinand. It was very successful at its premiere, to the point that the prima donna for the production, Antonia Bernasconi, specially brought arias from it with her to her next engagement in London.

== Roles ==
Role	Voice type	Premiere cast, 20 January 1775, Teatro San Carlo, Naples
Demofoonte, king of Thrace	tenor	Giuseppe Tibaldi
Dircea, secret wife of Timante	soprano	Antonia Bernasconi
Timante, believed to be the son of Demofoonte and hereditary prince of Thrace	soprano castrato	Ferdinando Tenducci
Creusa, a princess of Phrygia, intended bride of Timante	soprano	Elisabetta Fiorentini
Cherinto, a son of Demofoonte, in love with Creusa	soprano castrato	Giuseppe Pugnetti
Matusio, believed to be the father of Dircea	tenor	Michele Mazziotti
Adrasto, captain of the royal guards	alto	Celidea Squillace (in a breeches role)

== Synopsis ==
The Thracian king Demofoonte asks the oracle of Apollo how long the practice of the annual sacrifice of a virgin will continue. The answer is puzzling: "as long as the innocent usurper sits on the throne". The nobleman Matusio tries to protect his daughter Dircea from being sacrificed. He and Demofoonte are unaware that Dircea is secretly married to Timante, the son of Demofoonte and the heir to the throne. Demofoonte wants Timante to marry Creusa, a princess of Phrygia. Timante's younger brother Cherinto is accompanying her to the kingdom of Thrace, however he falls in love with her. Meeting Creusa, Timante admits that he cannot marry her, but does not explain why.

Dircea has been caught while trying to flee the country and imprisoned, and Demofoonte orders the immediate sacrifice of Dircea. Timante tries to release her but with no success. He is also imprisoned. Creusa asks Demofoonte for mercy. The king releases Timante and Dircea, and Timante decides to give up the throne in favour of Cherinto.

Suddenly they find a letter revealing that Dircea is the daughter of Demofoonte, which makes Timante and Dircea brother and sister. Timante is in despair, and tries to avoid Dircea. However another letter reveals that Timante is the son of Matusio. Everybody is happy. The marriage of Timante and Dircea becomes legal, and Cherinto is the real crown prince and can marry Creusa. No more virgins are sacrificed, since Timante is no longer the "innocent usurper of the throne".

== Vocal set pieces ==
Act I, scene 1 - Aria of Matusio, "O più non tremar non voglio"
Act I, scene 2 - Aria of Dircea, "In te spero o sposo amato"
Act I, scene 3 - Aria of Demofoonte, "Per lei fra l'armi"
Act I, scene 4 - Aria of Timante, "Sperai vicino al lido"
Act I, scene 5 - Aria of Cherinto, "T'intendo ingrata" [a non-Metastasian text]
Act I, scene 7 - Aria of Creusa, "Non curo l'affetto"
Act I, scene 8 - Aria of Cherinto, "Balena in quel sembiante" [a non-Metastasian text]
Act I, scene 12 - Aria of Dircea, "Padre, perdona, o pene"
Act I, scene 14 - Accompanied recitative for Timante, "Sposa mio ben"
Act I, scene 14 - Aria of Timante, "La dolce compagna vedersi rapire" [a non-Metastasian text]

Act II, scene 1 - Aria of Creusa, "Tu sai chi son tu sai"
Act II, scene 2 - Aria of Timante, "Prudente mi chiedi?"
Act II, scene 4 - Aria of Matusio, "E soccorso d'incognita mano"
Act II, scene 6 - Aria of Dircea, "Se tutti i mali miei"
Act II, scene 7 - Aria of Cherinto, "No, non chiedo amate stelle"
Act II, scene 9 - Aria of Demofoonte, "Perfidi, già che in vita"
Act II, Scene 10 - Accompanied recitative for Timante and Dircea, "Sposa. Timante"
Act II, scene 10 - Duet for Dircea and Timante, "La destra ti chiedo"

Act III, scene 1 - Aria of Adrasto, "Se ti bramassi estinto" [a non-Metastasian text]
Act III, scene 4 - Accompanied recitative for Timante, "Misero me"
Act III, scene 5 - Aria of Timante, "Misero pargoletto"
Act III, scene 6 - Aria of Demofoonte, "Odo il suono de' queruli accenti"
Act III, scene 7 - Aria of Dircea, "Che mai risponderti"

== Score ==
The complete score of Mysliveček's Demofoonte of 1775 is available for study online on the Italian website Internet Culturale in the form of a reproduction of a manuscript once in the possession of the Teatro San Carlo of Naples.

== See also ==
- Demofoonte, 1769 version
