= Semiramide (Mysliveček) =

Opera by Josef Mysliveček

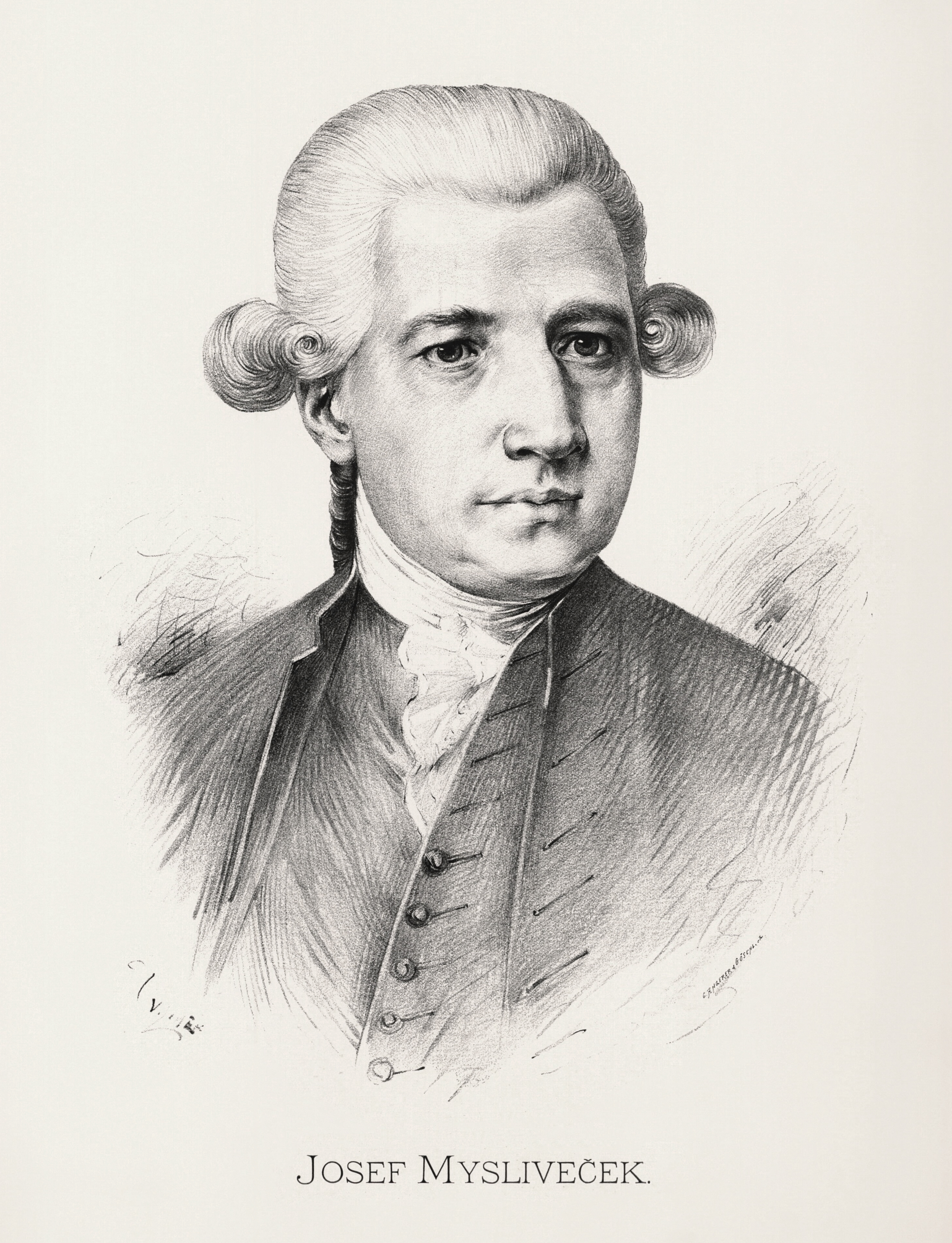
Josef Mysliveček

Semiramide is an 18th-century Italian opera in 3 acts by the Czech composer Josef Mysliveček. It was composed to a libretto by the Italian poet Metastasio that was first set to music in 1729. For a performance in the 1760s, it would only be expected that a libretto by Metastasio would be abbreviated and altered to suit contemporary operatic taste. The cuts and changes in the text made for the 1766 performance of Mysliveček's opera are not attributable. Semiramide conforms to the serious type of Italian opera (opera seria) that was typically set in the distant past and would usually feature the designation dramma per musica in librettos.

== Performance history ==
The opera was the first one ever composed by Mysliveček, just three years after he moved permanently from Prague to Italy, and just five years after he began composition lessons at the age of 24. As such, it represents an extraordinary achievement. Though produced at the minor operatic center of Bergamo in northern Italy during the summer fair there held in 1766, it attracted sufficient attention to lead to Mysliveček's commission to compose his opera Il Bellerofonte for the Teatro San Carlo in Naples, an overwhelming success that established him permanently as one of the leading composers of opera in Italy until his death in 1781. The original cast was not of first-rate abilities, but the simpler arias and ensembles composed for them found widespread use in Italy and central Europe after being copied into aria collections. Versions of the arias and ensembles with sacred texts substituted for the original Italian texts were disseminated in central Europe until the early 19th century. One of the vocal pieces that was particularly favored was the trio "Se sdegni un cor fedele" (operatic trios were rare in this period). Mysliveček's Semiramide is also known to have been performed in Alessandria in 1766 and Prague in 1768, when the composer made a triumphant return to his native city.

It is only to be expected that Mysliveček would seek a competent model to help him compose his first opera. In this case, it would appear to be a setting of Semiramide composed by Tommaso Traetta for Venice in 1765. Among other traits, the Mysliveček setting exhibits the same restrained virtuosity that the Traetta setting does. Mysliveček was mainly centered in Venice during his first years in Italy and received training from the composer Giovanni Battista Pescetti. Bergamo was the westernmost major city controlled by the Venetian Republic in his day.

== Roles ==
Roles	Voice type	Premiere, summer 1766, Teatro di Cittadella, Bergamo
Semiramide, an Egyptian princess	mezzo-soprano	Caterina Galli
Mirteo, an Egyptian prince, brother of Semiramide	soprano castrato	Adamo Solzi
Sibari, formerly in love with Semiramide	alto	Rosa Polidora (in a breeches role)
Idreno/Scitalce, an Indian prince, former lover of Semiramide	soprano castrato	Carlo Nicolini
Tamiri, princess of Bactria	soprano	Marianna Bucinelli
Ircano, a Scythian prince	tenor	Antonio Pini

== Synopsis ==
18th-century Italian operas in serious style are usually set in a distant or legendary past and are built around historical, pseudo-historical, or mythological characters. The main character of Metastasio's Semiramide is based on the legendary Assyrian queen Semiramis, who may have lived in the 9th century BC. Almost nothing is known of the historical Semiramis, which invited Metastasio to concoct a complicated love intrigue typical of operatic conventions of his day. He depicted Semiramis with the Italianized name of Semiramide as an Egyptian princess who rules Assyria disguised as a man. Princess Tamiri prepares to choose a husband from three candidates, setting in motion a series of events that lead to Semiramide being reunited with her lover Scitalce, and the exposure of the villainy of his rival Sibari.

== Vocal set pieces ==
Act I, scene 3 - Aria of Semiramide, "Non so se più t'accendi"
Act I, scene 4 - Aria of Scitalce, "Vorrei spiegar l'affanno"
Act I, scene 5 - Aria of Tamiri, "Che quel cor, quel ciglio altero"
Act I, scene 7 - Aria of Mirteo, "Bel piacer saria d'un core"
Act I, scene 10 - Aria of Scitalce, "Se intende sì poco"
Act I, scene 12 - Aria of Semiramide, "Ah, non è vano il pianto"
Act I, scene 14 - Aria of Ircano, "Talor se il vento fremi"

Act II, scene 2 - Chorus, "Il piacer, la gioia scenda"
Act II, scene 2 - Aria of Tamiri, "Tu mi disprezzi, ingrato"
Act II, scene 3 - Aria of Scitalce, "Voi, che le mie vicende"
Act II, scene 4 - Aria of Ircano, "Saper bramate"
Act II, scene 6 - Accompanied recitative for Semiramide, "Di Scitalce rifiuto"
Act II, scene 6 - Aria of Semiramide, "Il pastor, se torna Aprile"
Act II, scene 7 - Aria of Sibari, "Vieni, che in pochi istanti"
Act II, scene 8 - Aria of Mirteo, "Fiumicel che s'ode appena" [a non-Metastasian text]
Act II, scene 11 - Duet for Semiramide and Scitalce, "Giachè mi sprezzi, ingrato" [a non-Metastasian text]

Act III, scene 1 - Aria of Ircano, "Ciel mi vuole appresso" [a non-Metastasian text]
Act III, scene 4 - Aria of Semiramide, "Fuggi dagli occhi miei"
Act III, scene 7 - Trio for Mirteo, Tamiri, and Ircano, "Se sdegni un cor fedele" [a non-Metastasian text]
Act III, scene 9 - Chorus, "Viva lieta, e sia regina"
