= Demofoonte (Mysliveček, 1769) =

Opera by Josef Mysliveček (1769)

- Opera by Josef Mysliveček
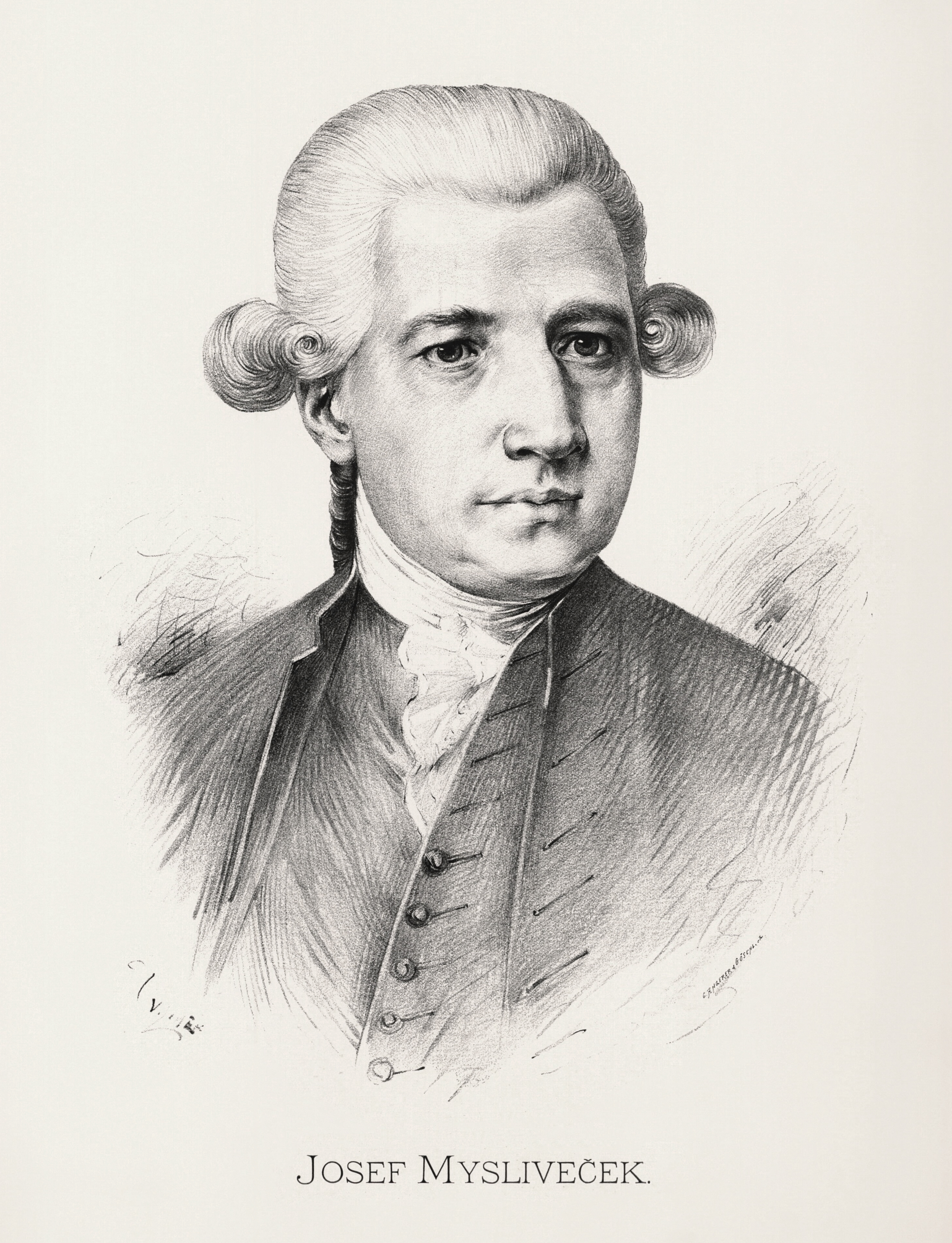
- Etching of the composer
- Librettist: Metastasio
- Language: Italian
- Premiere: 17 January 1769; Teatro San Benedetto in Venice

Demofoonte is an opera in three acts by the Czech composer Josef Mysliveček. It was the composer's first setting of this popular libretto by Metastasio first produced in 1733 (it was common in the second half of the eighteenth century for composers to set Metastasian texts two or more times over). This setting stays remarkably close to the original drama for its day (it was customary to alter Metastasian texts considerably so long after their original performances), but the role of Timante remained augmented in order to highlight the talents of its interpreter, the distinguished male soprano Gaetano Guadagni. All of Mysliveček's operas are of the serious type in Italian referred to as opera seria that would usually feature the designation dramma per musica in librettos.

== Performance history ==
The opera was first performed at the Teatro San Benedetto in Venice on 17 January 1769. It was very successful when it appeared. Indeed, the composer's first biographer, František Martin Pelcl, claimed that Venetian nobles stood in line outside of the theater to applaud his talents. The role of Timante in this production was sung by the great castrato Gaetano Guadagni during the last portion of his long career. Mysliveček's second version of Demofoonte premiered at the Teatro San Carlo, Naples, in 1775.

== Connection with Mozart ==
The overture composed for the opera is the most interesting aspect of the production, since it was extravagantly admired by the young Wolfgang Amadeus Mozart. In a short note written to his sister from Milan on 22 December 1770, he urgently requested her to find out whether a copy of it was available in Salzburg. If not, he vowed to bring a copy back home with him. Mozart used the overture as a source of musical motives in his own compositions for years, most recognizably at the start of the last movement of Mozart's Piano Concerto No. 9 of 1777. There is no other attributable music not by Mozart to be found in the entire Mozart correspondence except for the notes of the beginning of the first violin part from this overture that were copied down by Mozart to help his sister identify it.

== Roles ==
Role	Voice type	Premiere cast, 17 January 1769, Teatro San Benedetto, Venice
Demofoonte, king of Thrace	tenor	Francesco Zanetti
Dircea, secret wife of Timante	soprano	Anna de Amicis-Buonsollazzi
Timante, believed to be the son of Demofoonte and hereditary prince of Thrace	mezzo-soprano castrato	Gaetano Guadagni
Creusa, a princess of Phrygia, intended bride of Timante	soprano	Marianna Lombardi
Cherinto, a son of Demofoonte, in love with Creusa	soprano castrato	Giovanni Ripa
Matusio, believed to be the father of Dircea	tenor	Francesco Sandali
Adrasto, captain of the royal guards	soprano castrato	Giovanni Caffariello

== Synopsis ==
The Thracian king Demofoonte asks the oracle of Apollo how long the practice of the annual sacrifice of a virgin will continue. The answer is puzzling: "as long as the innocent usurper sits on the throne". The nobleman Matusio tries to protect his daughter Dircea from being sacrificed. He and Demofoonte are unaware that Dircea is secretly married to Timante, the son of Demofoonte and the heir to the throne. Demofonte wants Timante to marry Creusa, a princess of Phrygia. Timante's younger brother Cherinto is accompanying her to the kingdom of Thrace, however he falls in love with her. Meeting Creusa, Timante admits that he cannot marry her, but does not explain why.

Dircea has been caught while trying to flee the country and imprisoned, and Demofoonte orders the immediate sacrifice of Dircea. Timante tries to release her but with no success. He is also imprisoned. Creusa asks Demofoonte for mercy. The king releases Timante and Dircea, and Timante decides to give up the throne in favour of Cherinto.

Suddenly they find a letter revealing that Dircea is the daughter of Demofoonte, which makes Timante and Dircea brother and sister. Timante is in despair, and tries to avoid Dircea. However another letter reveals that Timante is the son of Matusio. Everybody is happy. The marriage of Timante and Dircea becomes legal, and Cherinto is the real crown prince and can marry Creusa. No more virgins are sacrificed, since Timante is no longer the "innocent usurper of the throne".

== Vocal set pieces ==
Act I, scene 1 - Aria of Matusio, "O più non tremar non voglio"
Act I, scene 2 - Aria of Dircea, "In te spero o sposo amato"
Act I, scene 3 - Aria of Demofoonte, "Per lei fra l'armi"
Act I, scene 4 - Aria of Timante, "Sperai vicino al lido"
Act I, scene 7 - Aria of Creusa, "Non curo l'affetto"
Act I, scene 8 - Aria of Cherinto, "Balena in quel sembiante" [a non-Metastasian text]
Act I, scene 12 - Aria of Dircea, "Padre, perdona, o pene"
Act I, scene 14 - Accompanied recitative for Timante, "Infelice Dircea"
Act I, scene 14 - Cavatina of Timante, "Ah no, bell'idol mio"
Act I, scene 14 - Aria of Timante, "Che fiero tormento" [a non-Metastasian text]

Act II, scene 1 - Aria of Creusa, "Tu sai chi son tu sai"
Act II, scene 2 - Aria of Timante, "Prudente mi chiedi?"
Act II, scene 4 - Aria of Matusio, "Vado, ma d'una figlia" [a non-Metastasian text]
Act II, scene 6 - Aria of Dircea, "Se tutti i mali miei"
Act II, scene 7 - Aria of Cherinto, "No, non chiedo amate stelle"
Act II, scene 10 - Aria of Demofoonte, "Perfidi, già che in vita"

Act III, scene 1 - Aria of Adrasto, "Non odi consiglio?"
Act III, scene 4 - Accompanied recitative for Timante, "Misero me"
Act III, scene 5 - Duet for Dircea and Timante, "La destra ti chiedo" [a non-Metastasian text]
Act III, scene 5 - Aria of Timante, "Misero pargoletto"
Act III, scene 7 - Aria of Dircea, "Che mai risponderti"
Act III, scene 11 - Chorus, "Par maggiore ogni diletto"

== Recording ==
- The overture to Mysliveček's Demofoonte of 1769 is included in a collection of symphonies and overtures by the composer recorded by the L'Orfeo Barockorchester, Michi Gaigg, conductor, CPO 777-050 (2004).

== See also ==
- Demofoonte, 1775 version
