= Antigona (Mysliveček) =

Opera by Josef Mysliveček

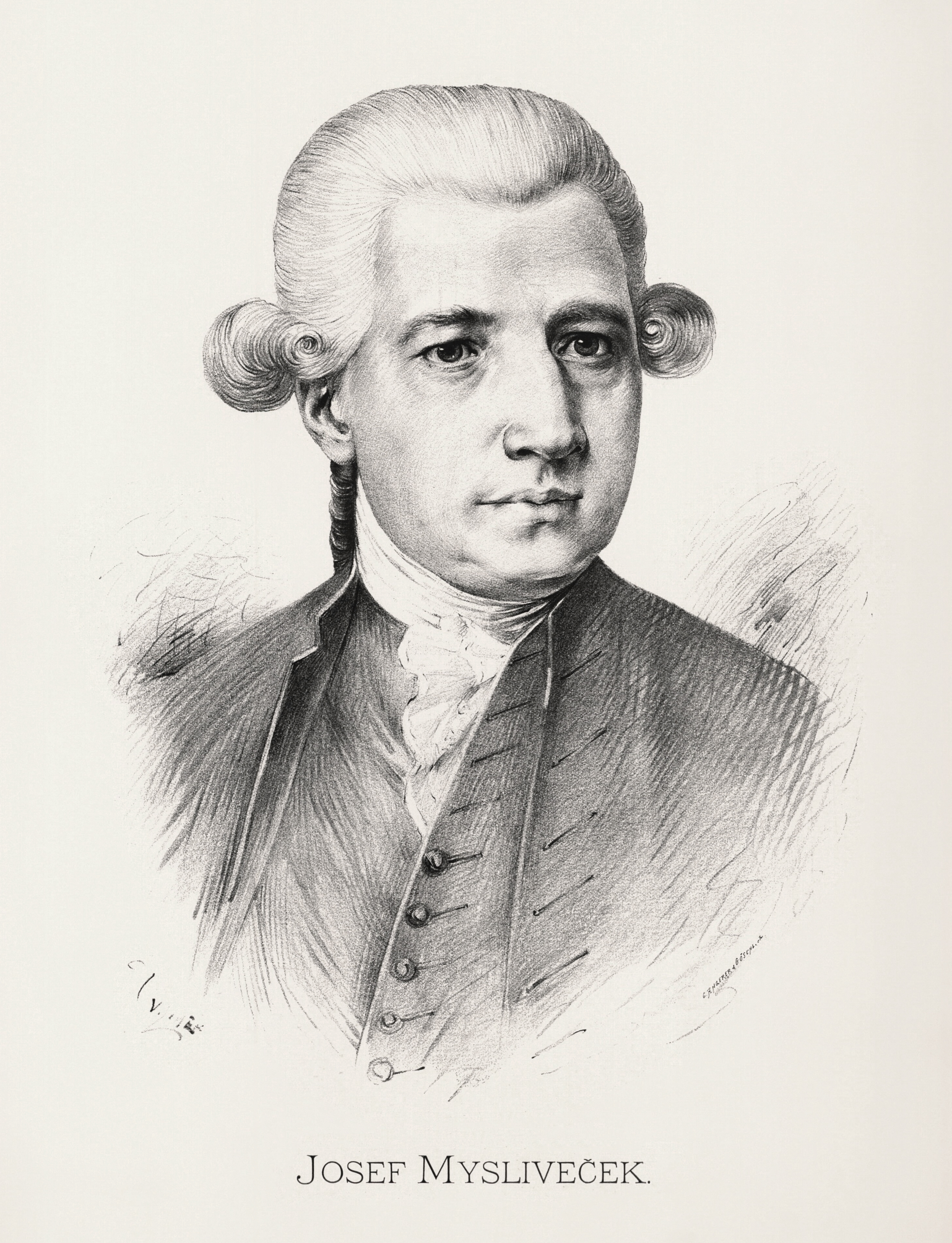
Josef Mysliveček

Antigona is an Italian opera in three acts by the Czech composer Josef Mysliveček set to a libretto by Gaetano Roccaforte that was originally produced in Rome with music by Baldassare Galuppi in 1751. The alterations made to the Roccaforte text are not attributable. All of Mysliveček's operas are of the serious type in Italian language referred to as opera seria and would usually feature the designation dramma per musica in librettos.

== Performance history ==
The opera was first performed at the Teatro Regio in Turin on 26 December 1773 at the beginning of the 1774 carnival operatic season. Opera productions at the royal court of Turin, which were sponsored only for the carnival season that took place at the beginning of each year, were famed for their lavish staging. Antigona was the last opera Mysliveček composed for Turin; there is no information concerning its reception. The most distinguished cast member was the castrato Venanzio Rauzzini. Antigona was revived for performances in Prague and Schloss Rheinsberg in 2006 and Biel, Switzerland, in 2011, with the title role sung by Mexican soprano Rosa Elvira Sierra (stage director Andreas Rosar, conductor Moritz Caffier). The latter production was also revived in October 2011 in Szeged.

== Roles ==
Cast	Voice type	Premiere, 26 December 1773, Teatro Regio, Turin
Antigona	soprano	Elisabetta Teuber
Creonte	tenor	Giuseppe Afferri
Euristeo	soprano castrato	Venanzio Rauzzini
Ermione	soprano	Francesca Varrese
Learco	soprano castrato	Lorenzo Piatti
Alceste	soprano	Teresa Silvani

== Vocal set pieces ==
Act I, scene 2 - Aria of Creonte, "No, tollerar, non voglio il tuo disprezzo altero"
Act I, scene 4 - Aria of Ermione, "Già più nel seno timor non sento"
Act I, scene 5 - Aria of Euristeo, "Pensa, o Dio, bell'idol mio"
Act I, scene 6 - Aria of Antigona, "Ben potete e scetro, e soglio"
Act I, scene 8 - Aria of Learco, "Sento l'affanno"
Act I, scene 9 - Aria of Alceste, "Se intorno all prova"
Act I, scene 10 - Duet for Antigona and Euristeo, "Se'l tuo fedel son io"

Act II, scene 3 - Aria of Ermione, "Vado, ma dove, o Dio"
Act II, scene 4 - Aria of Creonte, "Io sento che in petto"
Act II, scene 5 - Aria of Euristeo, "Che fiero destino"
Act II, scene 6 - Aria of Antigona, "Rende il mar"
Act II, scene 7 - Aria of Alceste, "Fra tante vicende"
Act II, scene 8 - Aria of Learco, "Quelle luci del mio bene"
Act II, scene 10 - Aria of Antigona, "Empio crudel tiranno"
Act II, scene 12 - Aria of Euristeo, "Deh, se mi brami in vita"
Act II, scene 13 - Aria of Creonte, "Sarò qual è il torrente"

Act III, scene 1 - Aria of Euristeo, "Frema in orrida sembianza"
Act III, scene 2 - Aria of Ermione, "Finche mi lusinga"
Act III, scene 3 - Aria of Learco, "Fra cento schiere e cento"
Act III, scene 4 - Cavatina of Antigona, "Fiere imagini di morte"
Act III, scene 5 - Aria of Creonte, "Empia, tremar comincia"
Act III, scene 7 - Trio for Antigona, Euristeo, and Ermione, "Ah, cela quel pianto non tanto dolor"
Act III, scene 13 - Chorus, "O grande, o generosa"

== Recordings ==
- One aria from Mysliveček's Antigona is available in a collection recorded by the Czech soprano Zdena Kloubová: "Rendi il mar" with substitute text "Nil me gladius vel parmo" due to the use of a source from a Bohemian ecclesiastical music collection; the recording is Panton 81 1044-2231 (1992) with the Benda Chamber Orchestra, Miroslav Hrdlička, conductor.
- One aria from Mysliveček's Antigona is available in a collection recorded by the Czech mezzo-soprano Magdalena Kožená: "Sarò qual è del torrente"; the recording is Deutsche Grammophon 0289-4776153 (2002) with the Prague Philharmonia, Michel Swierczewski, conductor.
