= Romanetto =

Romanetto (Czech: romanetto) is a literary genre popularized by the Czech writer Jakub Arbes. Works in this genre are usually novella length: longer than a traditional short story, but shorter than a novel. Their plots include an unexplained mystery that is later explained via rationality and scientific fact. While largely associated with Arbes, the term has been applied to modern Czech literature as well.

Arbes was a translator of Edgar Allan Poe and often drew upon Poe's supernatural themes in his work, calling the writer a "great model" with "[an] unusual knack for evoking fear in the reader via cold logical construction". The genre also bears similarities to crime literature and science fiction. His first romanetto, and the work that gave rise to the form, was the popular story Svatý Xaverius (The Saint Xaverius), published in the magazine Lumir in 1873. In this story, a painting by Franz Xaver Palko is believed to contain a magical cipher that leads to a hidden treasure, but the "treasure" in question is merely an obsessive knowledge that leads to the protagonist's death. Jan Neruda, the managing editor of the magazine, coined the term "romanetto" – an italic diminutive version of the Czech word román, for "novel".
