= Symphony No. 10 (Mozart) =

1770 composition by W. A. Mozart

- by W. A. Mozart
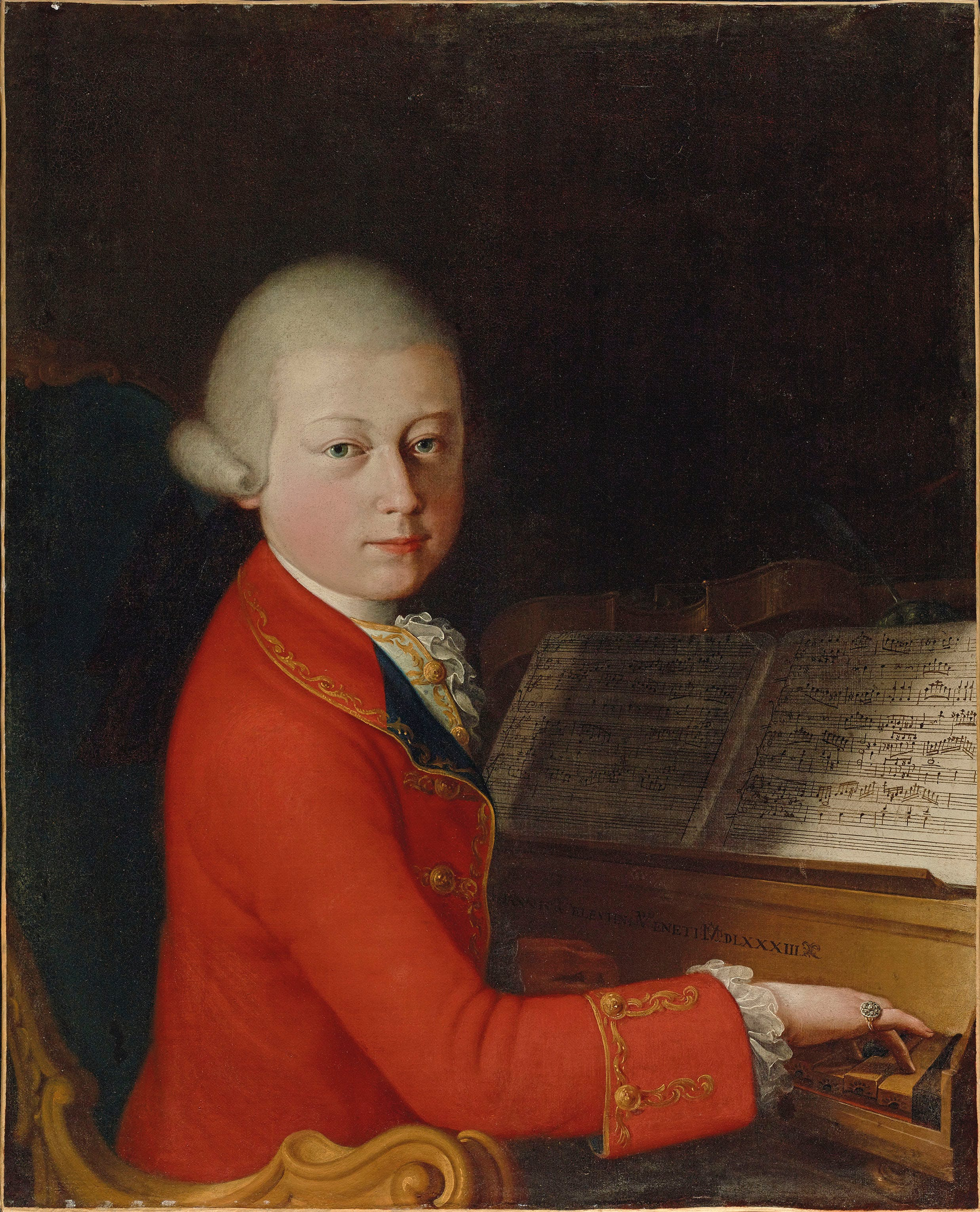
- 1770 Verona portrait of Mozart
- Key: G major
- Catalogue: K. 74
- Composed: Italy, 1770
- Duration: c. 9 minutes
- Movements: 3
- Scoring: Orchestra with continuo

The Symphony No. 10 in G major, K. 74, was written by Wolfgang Amadeus Mozart probably during his first journey to Italy in the spring of 1770.

The autograph score of the symphony, which does not contain any additional remarks by Mozart, bears the remark Ouverture zur Oper Mitridate (Ouverture to the opera Mitridate) by the hand of Johann Anton André, which is struck out except for the word "Ouverture". Obviously André was under the impression that this piece was originally planned as an overture to Mitridate, re di Ponto (which has an ouverture of its own, different from this symphony).

== Music ==
The symphony is scored for two oboes, two horns, strings, and basso continuo. The duration is approximately nine minutes.

The symphony is in the form of an Italian overture and consists of the following movements:

1. Allegro, 4/4
2. Andante, 3/8
3. Allegro, 2/4

(No tempo assignments are given in the autograph score.)

The andante section is not written as a separate movement, but as the second part of the opening movement, following immediately after a double barline at measure 118.
