= Il Bellerofonte =

Opera by Josef Mysliveček

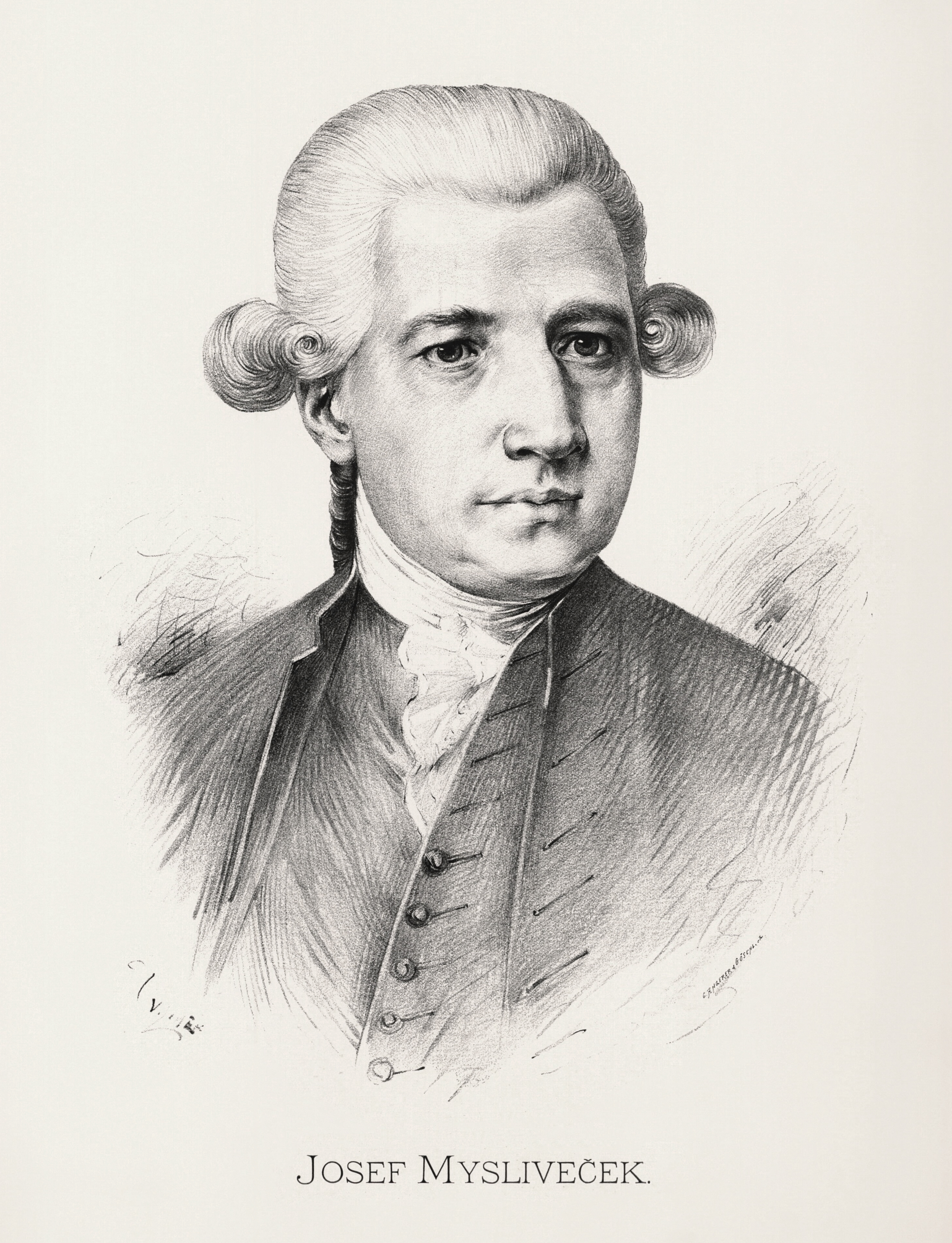
Josef Mysliveček

Il Bellerofonte is an 18th-century Italian opera in three acts by the Czech composer Josef Mysliveček. It conforms to the serious type (opera seria) that was typically set in the distant past and would usually feature the designation dramma per musica in librettos. The text, based on the Greek legend of Bellerophon, was written by Giuseppe Bonecchi. The work was dedicated to King Ferdinand I of the Two Sicilies and was first performed at the Teatro San Carlo in Naples on 20 January 1767, the birthday of his father, King Charles III of Spain. The cast featured two stellar singers of the time, Caterina Gabrielli and Anton Raaff, in the leading roles. The opera was only the composer's second one, and the first that permitted him the opportunity to write music for first-rate vocal artists. The production was highly successful, indeed responsible for a meteoric rise in his reputation as an operatic composer. From the time of the premiere of Bellerofonte until his death in 1781, Mysliveček succeeded in having more new opere serie brought into production than any other composer in Europe. During the same time span, he also had more new operas staged at the Teatro San Carlo in Naples than any other composer.

== Composition and performance history ==
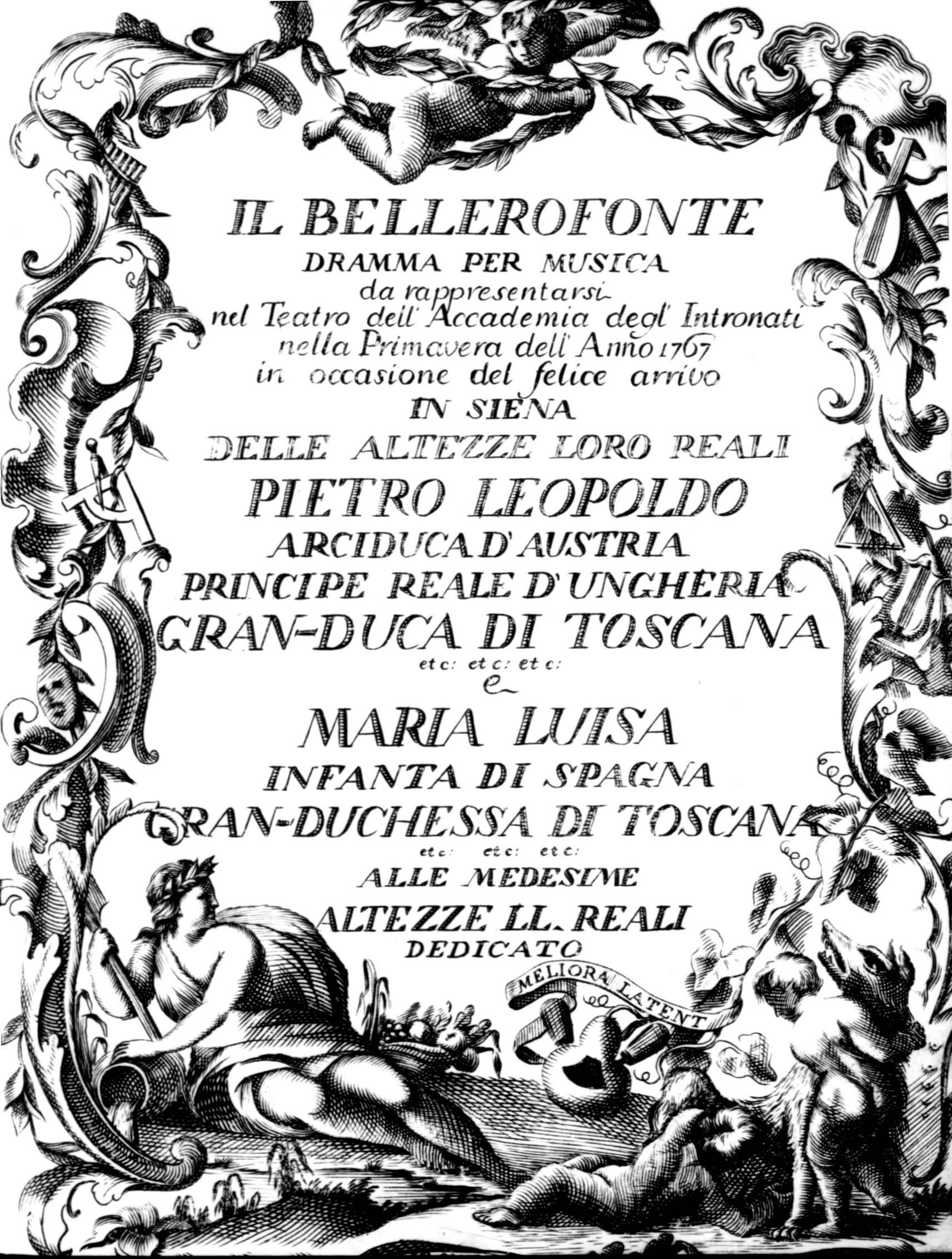
The title page of a libretto for Il Bellerofonte printed for its revival in Siena during the spring of 1767.

The subject, chosen by the management of the Teatro San Carlo, was unusual among Mysliveček's operas. Historical settings, rather than mythological ones, were customary for serious operas in Italy of the 1760s, unless elements from the French tragédie lyrique were included to create a Franco-Italian fusion. In this case, the inclusion of choruses and programmatic musical effects mark it as moderately influenced by French operatic traditions aside from the choice of mythological subject matter.

As in many 18th-century productions at the Teatro San Carlo, the first performance of Il Bellerofonte included separate ballets, none of the music for which was composed by Mysliveček or used in subsequent performances of the opera. The premiere production included a ballet at the end of Act I, Un bassà turco (A Turkish Pasha), and one at the end of Act II, Pantomimo tra Pulcinella, Arlecchino e Coviello (Pantomime between Pulcinella, Harlequin and Coviello). The opera was also preceded by a festive dance while a cantata was sung in honor of King Ferdinand I (also composed by Mysliveček). The ballets were choreographed by their leading dancer, Gennaro Magri. The opera was revived in Siena in spring of 1767 and Prague in carnival of 1768. A notation on a copy of the score in Paris indicates that it was revived at the San Carlo in 1769, however no librettos survive to confirm this.

Il Bellerofonte features many arias with elaborate vocal virtuosity of the type favored by Italian audiences of the 1760s. The ones most widely admired were "Splende così talora" from Act I, scene 2; "Giusti Dei" from Act I, scene 3; "Ch’io mai capace" from Act II, scene 5; and "Palesar vorrei col pianto" from Act II, scene 11. These arias were copied in aria collections throughout Italy, but they were even more widely disseminated in Bohemia in the collections of sacred institutions that substituted Latin texts for the original Italian. In this form, arias from Il Bellerofonte continued to circulate in central Europe well into the 19th century.

== Roles ==
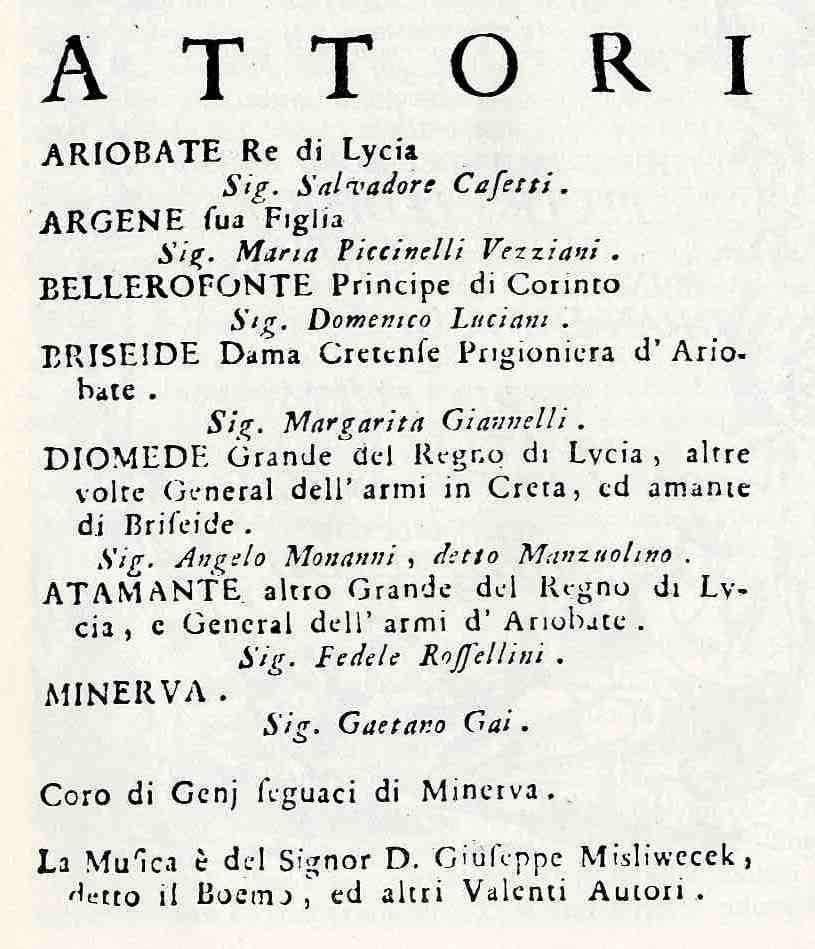
Cast list of Il Bellerofonte from the Siena libretto.

Role	Voice type	Premiere, 20 January 1767, Teatro San Carlo, Naples
Bellerofonte, Prince of Corinth	soprano castrato	Ferdinando Mazzanti
Ariobate, King of Lycia	tenor	Anton Raaff
Argene, his daughter	soprano	Caterina Gabrielli
Atamante, a courtier	tenor	Giuseppe Coppola
Diomede, in the service of the King	alto castrato	Angelo Monanni
Briseide, his mistress	mezzo-soprano	Francesca Gabrielli
Minerva, goddess of wisdom	soprano/castrato	Giuseppe Benigni
Courtiers, nobles, soldiers, guards, servants

== Synopsis ==
18th-century serious operas in Italy are typically love intrigues that resolve into happy marriages. Generally two marriages are necessary to bring all the love intrigues to a satisfactory conclusion. The lovers are often arranged in tiers based on social rank. The basic pretext of the story of Il Bellerofonte is a tragic separation of the lovers Bellerofonte and Argene due to the hostility of Argene's father Ariobate. Bellerofonte was the son of a king of Corinth, but his birthright was usurped by one Clearco. Without a kingdom of his own, Bellerofonte is not deemed an appropriate candidate for marriage to a royal princess. Bellerofonte proves his worthiness by slaying the monster that plagues Ariobate's kingdom with a yearly demand for the sacrifice of a noble virgin, but Ariobate accedes to the marriage of Argene and Bellerofonte only after an unexpected turn of events in the third act: news arrives that the usurper Clearco has been overthrown and Bellerofonte may re-claim the kingdom of Corinth. In a sidelight, the virgin Briseide, slated for sacrifice to the monster, is saved from death and finds a lover to marry in the "second tier" of romantic involvements.

== Vocal set pieces ==
Act I, scene 1 - Chorus, "Rendi alle selve"
Act I, scene 2 - Aria of Bellerofonte, "Splende così talora"
Act I, scene 3 - Aria of Argene, "Giusti Dei, che ben vedete"
Act I, scene 4 - Aria of Ariobate, "La frode se adempio"
Act I, scene 7 - Aria of Briseide, "Non è la morte"
Act I, scene 8 - Aria of Diomede, "Prometti ognor la calma"
Act I, scene 9 - Aria of Ariobate, "Di che pupille amabili"
Act I, scene 11 - Duet for Argene and Bellerofonte, "Vanne pur, ma dimmi pria"

Act II, scene 1 - Aria of Atamante, "Già cinto sembrami"
Act II, scene 2 - Aria of Diomede, "Come potrai, tiranno"
Act II, scene 4 - Aria of Bellerofonte, "Parto, ma in quest'istante"
Act II, scene 5 - Accompanied recitative for Argene, "Sarete alfin contenti"
Act II, scene 5 - Aria of Argene, "Ch'io mai capace"
Act II, scene 10 - Aria of Ariobate, "Pria ch'io perda"
Act II, scene 11 - Aria of Argene, "Palesar vorrei col pianto"
Act II, scene 12 - Aria of Briseide, "Se ognor fra cento affanni"
Act II, scene 13 - Accompanied recitative for Bellerofonte, "Dell'indomita belva," with aria, "Di quei sassi"
Act II, scene 14 - Accompanied recitative for Minerva, "Calma del petto," with cavatina, "Riedano gli astri amici"
Act II, scene 14 - Chorus, "Fra le procelle, e i nembi"

Act III, scene 2 - Aria of Atamante, "Nuove procelli ancora"
Act III, scene 3 - Aria of Briseide, "Torbido, e nero il da a noi"
Act III, scene 5 - Aria of Diomeded, "Qual ristretto in picciol letto"
Act III, scene 8 - Trio for Argene, Bellerofonte, and Ariobate, "Barbare stelle ingrate"
Act III, scene 10 - Chorus, "Se dei nume a questo segno"

== Recording ==
The world premiere (and so far only) recording of the opera was made in 1987 and released in 1991 on the Supraphon label, with Gladys Mayo (Argene); Douglas Ahlstedt (Ariobate), Raul Giménez (Atamante); Celina Lindsley (Bellerofonte), Krisztina Laki (Briseide); Štefan Margita (Diomede); Czech Philharmonic Chorus; Prague Chamber Orchestra; Zoltán Peskó (conductor).
