= Josef Mysliveček =

Czech composer

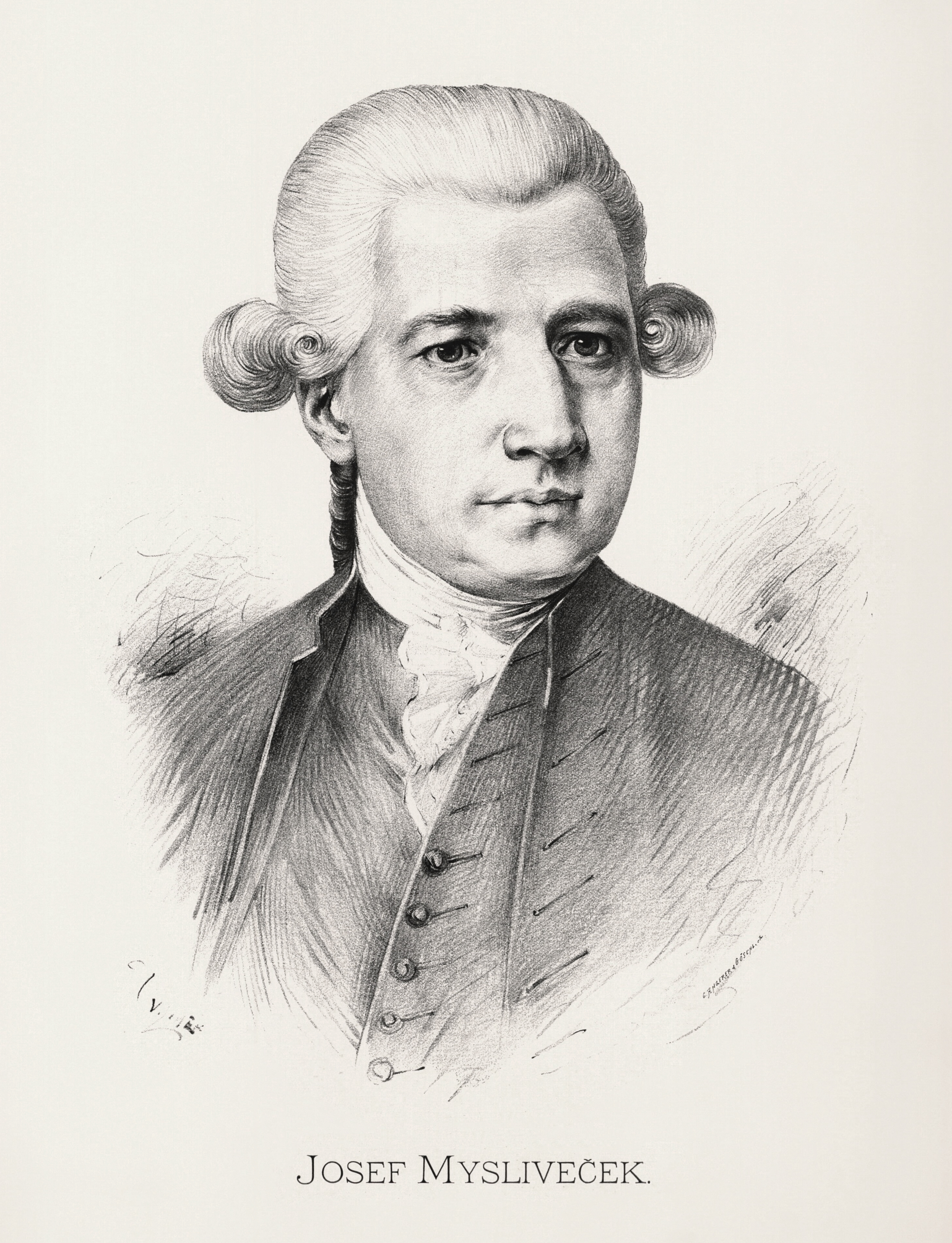
Posthumous portrait of Josef Mysliveček by Jan Vilímek based on a contemporary engraving

Josef Mysliveček (9 March 1737 – 4 February 1781) was a Czech composer. He contributed to the formation of late eighteenth-century classicism in music. Mysliveček provided his younger friend Wolfgang Amadeus Mozart with significant compositional models in the genres of symphony, Italian serious opera, and violin concerto; both Wolfgang and his father Leopold Mozart considered him an intimate friend from the time of their first meetings in Bologna in 1770 until he betrayed their trust over the promise of an operatic commission for Wolfgang to be arranged with the management of the Teatro di San Carlo in Naples. His closeness to the Mozart family resulted in frequent references to him in the Mozart correspondence.

== Biography ==
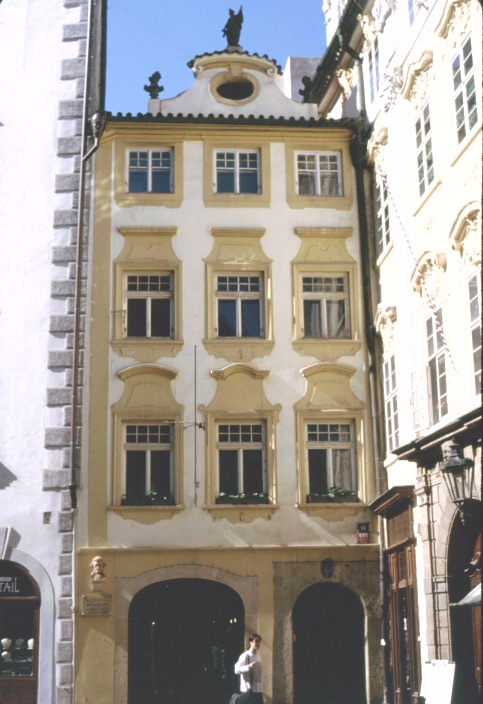
The house of Mysliveček's parents on Melantrichova Street in the Old Town of Prague, where the composer spent much of his childhood and early adulthood. A bust of the composer can be seen on the lower left above a commemorative plaque.

Mysliveček was born in Prague, one of twin sons of a prosperous mill owner, and studied philosophy at Charles-Ferdinand University before following in the footsteps of his father. No documentation exists to support claims that he was actually born in Horní Šárka, a rural district to the north and west of Prague in the early eighteenth century. He achieved the rank of master miller in 1761 but gave up the family profession in order to pursue musical studies. In Prague, he studied composition with Franz Johann Habermann and Josef Seger in the early 1760s. His ambitions led him to travel to Venice in 1763 to study with Giovanni Battista Pescetti. His travel to Italy was subsidized in part from family wealth, in part from the Bohemian nobleman Vincenz von Waldstein. In Italy he became known as Il Boemo ("the Bohemian") and also Venatorino ("the little hunter"), a literal translation of his name. Reports that he was known as Il divino Boemo ("the Divine Bohemian") during his lifetime are false. The nickname originated from the title of a romanetto about the composer by Jakub Arbes that was first published in 1884. He was made a member of the Accademia Filarmonica di Bologna in 1771. Mysliveček prized freedom of movement and was never employed directly by any noble, prelate, or ruler, unlike most of his contemporaries. He earned his living through teaching, performing, and composing music, and frequently received gratuities from wealthy admirers.

After his arrival in Italy in 1763, Mysliveček never left the country except for a visit to Prague in 1768, a short visit to Vienna in 1772, and an extended stay in Munich between December 1776 and April 1778. His return to Prague led to the production of several of his operas. He was invited to Munich by the musical establishment of the Elector Maximilian III Joseph to compose an opera for the carnival season of 1777 (Ezio).

Mysliveček's first opera, Semiramide, was performed at Bergamo in 1766 (there is no evidence that a putative production at Parma of an opera titled Medea ever took place). His Il Bellerofonte was a great success in Naples after its first performance at the Teatro di San Carlo on 20 January 1767, and it led to a number of commissions from Italian theaters. Ever after, his productions would almost always feature first-rate singers in the leading roles. Almost all of his operas were successful until a disastrous production of Armida that took place at the Teatro alla Scala in Milan for the carnival season of 1780. One of the many honors that came to him for his talents as a composer of opera was a commission to provide the music for the opening of a new opera theater in Pavia in 1773 (his first setting of Metastasio's libretto Demetrio).

Other than a reputation for promiscuity recorded in the Mozart correspondence, nothing is known of Mysliveček's love life. The composer never married, and no names of lovers are recorded. There is no documentation to support reports of romantic liaisons with the singers Caterina Gabrielli and Lucrezia Aguiari; no mention of love affairs with these singers pre-dates the publication of the fifth edition of the Grove Dictionary of Music and Musicians (1954).

Financially irresponsible throughout his life, he died destitute in Rome in 1781. He is buried in the church of San Lorenzo in Lucina, where a memorial placed by latter-day Czech admirers can be seen. No trace has ever been found of a memorial in marble supposedly erected shortly after his death by James Hugh Smith Barry, a wealthy English student of Mysliveček who paid for his funeral expenses.

== Relationship with Mozart ==
Mysliveček first met Mozart in March 1770 in Bologna, as confirmed in the Reisenotizen (travel notes) of his father Leopold. At the time, Mozart was only 14 years old. Soon after, Mysliveček became one of the composers most frequently mentioned in the Mozart family correspondence. Mysliveček encountered Wolfgang and Leopold Mozart during all three of their trips to Italy between 1770 and 1773 and were especially close during the first one. Throughout this period of acquaintance, the Mozarts found Mysliveček's dynamic personality irresistible. Sadly, contacts were broken off in 1778 after Mysliveček failed to make good on a promise to arrange an opera commission for Mozart at the Teatro di San Carlo in Naples.

Many important details about Mysliveček's character traits and personal affairs are found in a letter of Wolfgang Mozart to his father written in Munich on 11 October 1777, which documents the aftermath of an operation performed by an incompetent surgeon that resulted in Mysliveček's nose being burned off as part of treatment for a mysterious chronic illness. A letter of Leopold Mozart to his son of 1 October 1777 refers to the illness as something shameful for which Mysliveček was deserving of social ostracism. Mysliveček's reputation for sexual promiscuity, Leopold's insinuations, and the reference to facial disfigurement in Wolfgang's letter all suggest symptoms of tertiary syphilis. Mysliveček's explanation for his condition to Wolfgang – bone cancer caused by a carriage accident — seems preposterous. The concern Mozart revealed to his father at this time for Mysliveček's sufferings was very touching indeed. In the entire Mozart correspondence, no individual outside the Mozart family was ever the cause for as much outpouring of emotion as what is found in Wolfgang's description of his visit to Mysliveček at a hospital in Munich:

When he came up to me, I took him by his hand and he took mine, in friendship. "Just look," he said, "how unfortunate I am!" His words and his appearance...touched me so deeply that I couldn't say anything, except, half crying: "My dear friend, I feel for you with all my heart." If it were not for his face, he would be the same old Mysliveček, full of fire, spirit and life, a little thin, of course, but otherwise the same excellent cheerful fellow.

Mozart's mother, who was in Munich accompanying her son on a lengthy trip through Europe in search of musical employment, met Mysliveček for the first time and completely fell under his spell, totally convinced of his devotion to her son and the progress of his musical career. Neither she nor Wolfgang would ever see him again.

Throughout his career as a composer, Mozart made a habit of picking up melodic ideas from other composers to enrich his own creations, thus it is only natural that he used Mysliveček's works as a source of motivic material. At the time of their first meeting in 1770, the most significant use of such borrowings is found in Mozart's opera Mitridate, re di Ponto, of 1770, the first of the composer's three operas written for Milan. It was only natural for Mozart to turn to the work of a more experienced (and quite successful) composer whose company both he and his father had found irresistibly agreeable, as a model for compositional procedures and melodic style. It was Mysliveček's opera La Nitteti, which had been performed in the spring of 1770 in Bologna, where the two originally met, that offered considerable guidance in how to produce an opera in serious style that would appeal to Italians. The most obvious uses of Mysliveček's music from La Nitteti as a source of inspiration in Mozart's Mitridate are found in its overture, its opening aria, “Al destin, che la minaccia” (based on the opening aria of Mysliveček's La Nitteti, “Sono in mar”), and the aria “Lungi da te,” which is closely based on Mysliveček's aria “Se la cagion saprete” from Act II of La Nitteti.

Mozart, unlike Joseph Haydn, was the author of many Italianate symphonies cast in the three-movement format fast-slow-fast, a number of them actually composed in Italy when he was in contact with Mysliveček, thus it is not surprising that Mozart used motives from Mysliveček's three-movement and adopted common Italianate techniques of symphonic writing standard in the symphonies of Mysliveček. The use of motives from the overture of La Nitteti in various early symphonies of Mozart has been documented, specifically in the Symphony No. 10), the Symphony in D major, K. 81, and the Symphony in D major, K. 95. Mozart's Symphony No. 9 of 1773, in contrast, opens in a very similar manner to the overture to Mysliveček's opera Il gran Tamerlano of 1772. The opening of Mozart's Symphony No. 29 of 1774 closely resembles the opening of an accompanied recitative from Mysliveček's opera Motezuma. Other early Mozart symphonies that reveal traits possibly attributable to Mysliveček's influence include the Symphonies Nos. 22, 23, 24, and 25. An unusual phenomenon at the court of Salzburg in the late 1770s was a vogue for three-movement symphonies, a trend in which Michael Haydn also participated. The Mozart works in question are the Symphonies Nos. 31 of 1778, 33 of 1779 (with a minuet added later), and 34 of 1780. This period was preceded by the influx into Salzburg of a number of Mysliveček orchestral works commissioned from the archbishop of Salzburg with the careful assistance of Leopold Mozart, an episode amply documented in the Mozart correspondence from 1777 and 1778. The possibility that three-movement formats became favored for a time due to exposure to Mysliveček's music brought to Salzburg at the behest of the archbishop must remain open, but no other explanation for this phenomenon has ever been advanced in Mozart scholarship.

Many thematic borrowings from Mysliveček's scores in to Mozart's non-symphonic works, some clearer than others, have been enumerated by Daniel E. Freeman. One of the most interesting concerns the opening theme of the third movement of Mozart's Piano Concerto No. 9 of 1777, which appears to quote the opening of the first violin part of Mysliveček's overture to his opera Demofoonte of 1769 almost verbatim. This overture was extravagantly admired by the young Mozart. In a short note written to his sister from Milan on 22 December 1770, he urgently requested her to find out whether a copy of it was available in Salzburg. If not, he vowed to bring a copy back home with him. There is no other attributable music not by Mozart to be found in the entire Mozart correspondence except for the notes of the beginning of the first violin part from this overture that were copied down by Mozart to help his sister identify it. The quotation of this theme in the third movement of the Piano Concerto No. 9 confirms that the music for the Demofoonte overture was indeed available to Mozart in Salzburg, one way or another. Among Mozart's other concertos, a close similarity between the opening of Mozart's Violin Concerto No. 4 of 1775 and a D-major violin concerto by Mysliveček was originally recognized in the 1920s. The close reference Mozart made to another violin concerto of Mysliveček as part of preparing his Violin Concerto No. 1 of 1773, has been documented more recently. The same Mysliveček concerto may also have been used to create the opening of Mozart's Bassoon Concerto, K. 314 of 1774. The use of motives from Mysliveček's East Divertimentos for keyboard in Mozart's Piano Sonata No. 9, K. 311 and Piano Sonata No. 11, K. 309, both written shortly after the composer's last visit with Mysliveček in Munich in October 1777, has long been noted.

The German musicologist Christoph-Hellmut Mahling was the first to notice an uncanny similarity between the opening of an accompanied recitative in Mysliveček's oratorio Isacco, figura del redentore (“Eterno Dio” from Part 1) and the opening of the scene “Zu Hülfe, zu Hülfe” from Act 1 of Mozart's opera The Magic Flute of 1791. It is unknown whether or not Mozart actually came into contact with Isacco, figura del redentore (first performed in Munich during Lent of 1777) during his trip to Munich in autumn of 1777, in which he reported in a letter of 11 October that “all Munich is talking about [it]”. The oratorio was performed in many parts of Europe later in the 1770s and 1780s, however. As far as contacts with Mozart are concerned, it is known that Emanuel Schikaneder, the librettist and producer of The Magic Flute with a long-standing relationship with the Mozart family, lived in Munich in the late 1770s and produced Isacco, figura del redentore in Buda in 1785 as part of his activities as an impresario.

=== The canzonetta "Ridente la calma" ===
Of particular interest for music lovers is the basis of Mozart's “Ridente la calma”, K. Anh.A 36 (formerly K. 152 and 210a), an arrangement (or transcription) for voice and piano of an operatic aria whose music was originally written by Mysliveček with the words "Il caro mio bene" for his opera Armida of 1780. The circumstances surrounding the preparation of Mozart’s arrangement have long been mysterious, but recent research has brought important clues to light.

No autograph manuscript for Mozart’s “Ridente la calma” survives. The earliest mention of it in the Mozart documentation is a letter of Constanze Mozart written to the Leipzig publisher Breitkopf & Härtel on 25 February 1799. In this letter, Constanze offered Breitkopf & Härtel 21 miscellaneous compositions by her late husband for sale, among them “Ridente la calma.” Breitkopf & Härtel published the piece the same year, but the manuscript used as the basis for the edition was somehow lost. In the original thematic catalogue of Mozart’s compositions published by Ludwig Köchel, it was numbered 152 with a suggested date of 1772. The basis for this date was likely the simplicity of the musical materials and its archaic dal segno aria format. The dating may also have been influenced by the opinion of Otto Jahn that it “would fit quite well in one of [Mozart’s] older Italian operas”. In the early 20th century, there was a feeling among certain Mozart scholars that the piece might have been from a slightly later period, perhaps 1772-76, and in the third edition of the Köchel catalogue edited by Alfred Einstein, the number assigned to it was 210a, a higher number to reflect a later chronological framework. Sensibly, “Ridente la calma” was removed from the main portion of the Köchel catalogue in its latest edition and placed in Anhang (Appendix) A among arrangements of works by other composers.

For quite a long period of time, “Ridente la calma” was accepted as a genuine composition of Mozart with little dispute, but in 1929, Georges de Saint-Foix published an article that demonstrated the vocal piece to be an arrangement of the aria “Il caro mio bene” by Mysliveček, which he discovered in a portfolio of Mysliveček arias he came across in the music collection of the Conservatoire de Paris. The manuscript included no dating of the aria nor any indication of an opera that it might have been used in. Collations of Mysliveček’s vocal music prepared in the 1980s and 1990s by Stanislav Bohadlo and Daniel E. Freeman revealed that “Il caro mio bene” is associated with the opera Armida without any evidence that it was composed earlier than the première of the work for carnival 1780 at the Teatro alla Scala in Milan.

The unusual stylistic profile of “Il caro mio bene” is attributable to Mysliveček’s close personal connections with the renowned castrato soprano Luigi Marchesi (who appeared in Mysliveček’s opera Ezio and oratorio Isacco, figura del redentore in Munich in 1777, then was brought to Naples for the 1778-79 operatic season to appear in Mysliveček’s La Calliroe and L'Olimpiade in roles that established him permanently as a great operatic figure in Italy and led to singing engagements all over Europe. Before arriving in Milan at the end of 1779 to sing the role of Rinaldo in Armida, Marchesi had appeared both in Mysliveček’s opera La Circe in Venice in May of the same year and Francesco Biachi’s opera Castore e Polluce in Florence in the autumn. It is known that Marchesi brought the aria “Se piangi, se peni” from Castore e Polluce with him to Milan, because it was mentioned in a press report from the 1784 as being used to replace one of the unsuccessful arias in Mysliveček’s Armida after the opera had failed and Mysliveček himself had left Milan to supervise a production of his next opera, Medonte, in Rome during the same carnival operatic season of 1780. Marchesi achieved notable success in Milan with Bianchi’s “Se piangi, se peni.” It was clearly favored greatly by Marchesi, who had already had it inserted in November 1779 into Giuseppe Sarti’s Achille in Sciro, the second opera of the autumn season in Florence that year.

As can be seen by comparing the arias “Se piangi, se peni” by Bianchi and “Il caro mio bene” by Mysliveček, the latter was clearly based closely on the former. Each is in the same key and same old-fashioned dal-segno format and share similar length, similar tempo, similar triple meter, and very similar melodic profiles. This hints at the desire of Marchesi to force the insertion of “Se piangi, se peni” into the production of Armida, which would have been a problem for Mysliveček, who was averse to permitting arias by other composers to be used in the first performances of his operas (not a single case of which has ever been identified in any of the scores prepared for his operatic premières). Instead of incorporating a Bianchi aria into his score, Mysliveček supplied Marchesi with a new aria in a similar style that conformed to the general orientation of Castore e Polluce by Bianchi, a “Franco-Italian” fusion that incorporated traits of “reform” opera as cultivated by Christoph Willibald Gluck. This explains the Frenchified mythological subject matter of Bianchi’s opera and the dominance of arias of modest length with simple, “natural” melodic lines devoid of elaborate coloratura (generally a specialty of Mysliveček’s arias). Although the audiences in Milan in 1780 did not care for the result that Mysliveček produced, his aria enjoyed long-term success. It circulated as an independent vocal piece attributed to Mysliveček, and Marchesi must have carried it with him as a favored aria for years, the likely means by which the music eventually came into Mozart’s hands.

A fresh expansion of theories concerning the dissemination of Mysliveček’s music for the aria “Il caro mio bene” and the replacement of its text with “Ridente la calma” has recently been compiled by the Italian musicologist Lucio Tufano. Marchesi made a habit of commissioning arias of modest proportions in moderate triple meter for use in the third acts of the operas in which he appeared. As far as Mozart’s arrangement “Ridente la calma” is concerned, the next important aria to be singled out is Francesco Bianchi’s “Ridente la calma” as it appears in his opera Il trionfo della pace for Turin in 1782. This aria, in similar musical style to both Bianchi’s earlier aria “Se piangi, se peni” and Mysliveček’s “Il caro mio bene,” was set to the same text as Mozart’s “Ridente la calma” and now (after a very long period of mystery) can be attributed to the librettist of the opera Il trionfo della pace, Cesare Oliveri. Mozart’s musical setting of "Ridente la calma" differs little from the model of Mysliveček’s “Il caro mio bene”, but the middle of Bianchi’s version seems to have been the source of some musical features of the middle section of Mozart’s “Ridente la calma.”

The precise dating of Mozart’s version of “Ridente la calma” cannot be established with certainty, but it would naturally make sense to believe that it originated from a time and place in which both Marchesi and Mozart were present at the same time. There is only one possibility for such a meeting: a short period in 1785 (perhaps in the autumn) when both men were present in Vienna during the preparations and performance of Giuseppe Sarti’s opera Giulio Sabino, in which Marchesi appeared. There is no record, however, of Marchesi’s activities in Vienna at this time other than his performance in the opera, and there is no documentary confirmation that Mozart ever met Marchesi in his entire life. The latest edition of the Köchel catalog specifies the date of composition of Mozart’s arrangement “Il caro mio bene” as “presumably around 1785” in Vienna.

Regardless, Mozart’s arrangement "Ridente la calma" remains one of the most recognizable compositions for voice and piano from the late 18th century, especially as a teaching piece, and it is still widely disseminated in music collections. In particular, it is a staple of student vocal recitals at the intermediate and advanced levels in many parts of the world. Its music is the most familiar example of Mysliveček's compositions presently heard.

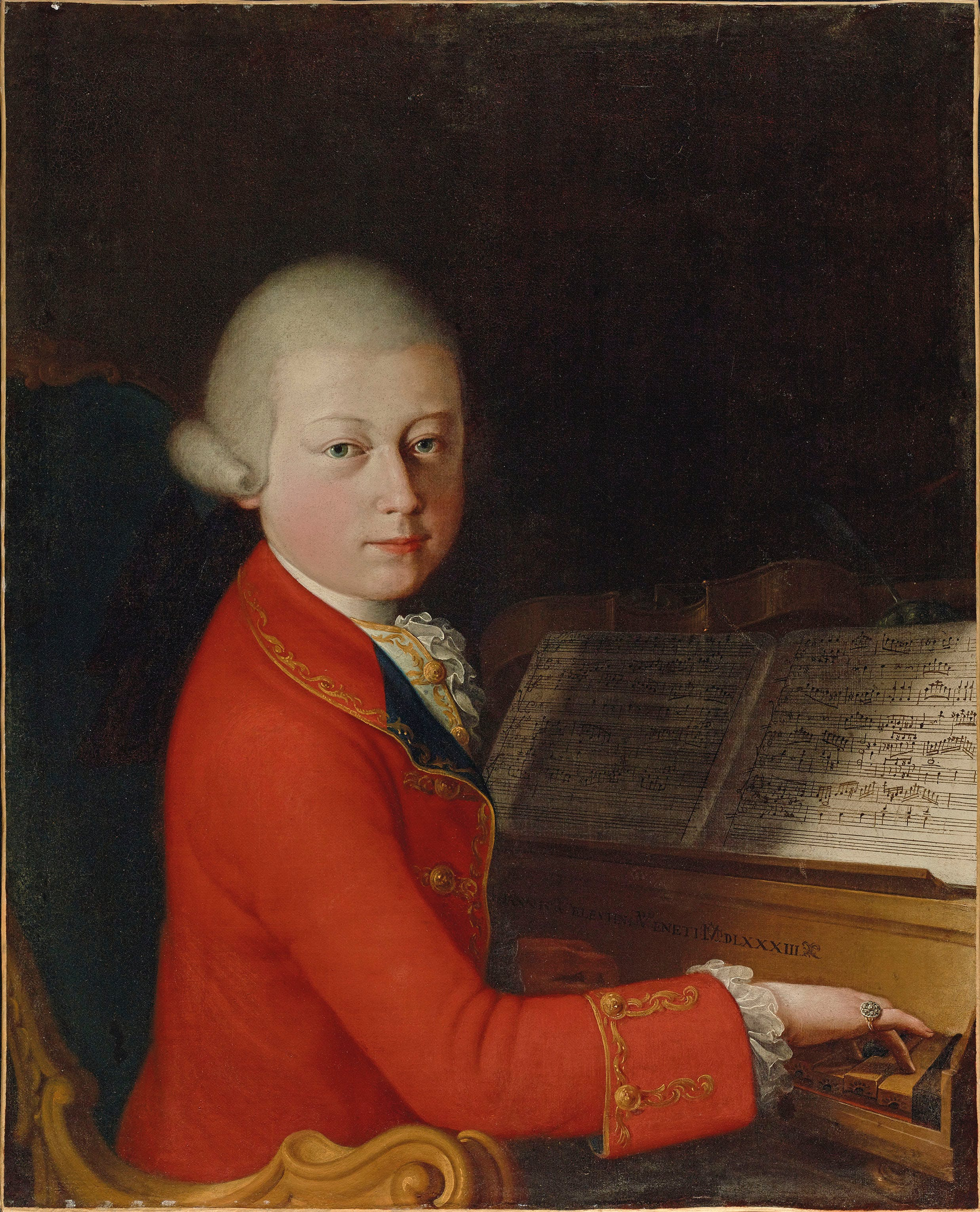
A portrait of Mozart, aged 14, in Verona, 1770, by Saverio dalla Rosa (1745–1821)

== Compositions ==
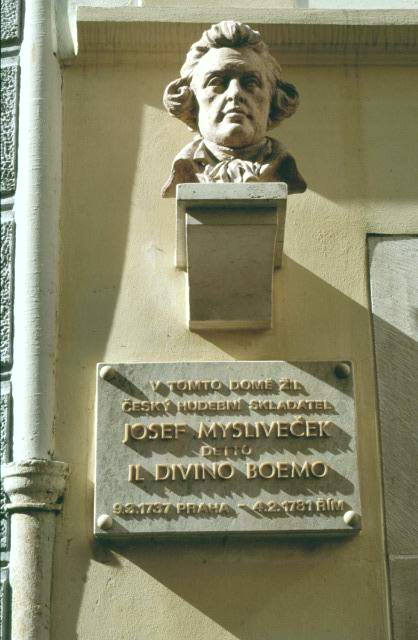
Bust on the Mysliveček house in Prague.

In all, he wrote twenty-six opere serie, including the aforementioned Il Bellerofonte. Nearly all were successful at their first performances until the disaster of Armida at La Scala during carnival of 1780. Some of the irregularities that doomed this production were not Mysliveček's fault, such as the interruption of performances caused by the lying-in of the prima donna Caterina Gabrielli, who gave birth, out of wedlock, in the middle of the run, at the age of 49.

During the period of his activity as a composer of operas (1766–1780), Mysliveček succeeded in having more new opere serie brought into production than any other composer in Europe. It is noteworthy that in this same period more of his works were performed at the Teatro San Carlo in Naples, the most prestigious venue in Italy at that time for productions of serious opera, than those of any other composer. Nonetheless, his contributions to Italian operatic culture of the 1760s and 1770s have been almost universally ignored by opera historians.

Mysliveček and Gluck were the first Czechs to become famous as operatic composers, but their output exhibits few, if any, Czech characteristics. Mysliveček's operas were very much rooted in a style of Italian opera seria that prized above all the vocal artistry to be found in elaborate arias.

Among his other pieces were oratorios, symphonies, concertos, and chamber music, including the Op. 2 string quintets which were almost certainly the earliest string quintets with two violas ever published. Additionally, he was a pioneer in the composition of music for wind ensemble, the outstanding examples of which are his three wind octets. It may be fair to say that his greatest composition is the oratorio Isacco, figura del redentore, first performed in Florence in 1776. His violin concertos are perhaps the finest composed between the generation of Vivaldi and the Mozart violin concertos of 1775.

He was also one of the most gifted and most prolific composers of eighteenth-century symphonies, although his contributions to this genre have been ignored by musicologists in western Europe and North America almost as completely as his operas have been. Nearly all of Mysliveček's symphonies are cast in three movements without a minuet, following Italian traditions that originated in opera overtures. His opera overtures are also cast in three movements and were frequently performed as independent instrumental pieces. In the 1770s, he was the finest symphonist resident in Italy, and the esteem he enjoyed is reflected in the issuance of a set of symphonies (originally opera overtures) published by Ranieri del Vivo in Florence that was the first anthology of symphonies ever printed in Italy.

Mysliveček's compositions evoke a gracious, diatonic style typical of Italian classicism in music. His best works are characterized by melodic inventiveness, logical continuity, and a certain emotional intensity that may be attributable to his dynamic personality.

== Works ==
=== Instrumental works ===
Mysliveček's instrumental music includes divertimenti, sonatas, symphonies, etc. Lost and questionable works have been omitted from this list, but they are inventoried fully in Catalog 1 of Freeman (2022), which also provides a complete list of recordings and early and modern editions of the composer's music. The listings here do not report all manuscript and printed sources, rather key eighteenth-century sources and catalogs that offer clues to chronology.

Works for solo keyboard

- Six Easy Divertimentos for the Harpsichord or Piano-Forte. London: Longman & Broderip, 1777. [F major, A major, D major, B♭ major, G major, C major]
- Six Easy Lessons for the Harpsichord. Edinburgh: Corri & Sutherland, 1784. [C major, B♭ major, A major, G major, F major, D major]
- 1 undated sonata in C major in the Archivio e Museo della Badia of the Basilica Benedettina di San Pietro, Perugia

Violin sonatas

- 5 sonatas for violin and a bass line preserved in manuscripts in the library of the Conservatorio di Musica Niccolò Paganini in Genoa, perhaps from the 1760s
- Six Sonatas for the Piano Forte or Harpsichord with an Accompaniment for a Violin. London: Charles & Samuel Thompson, c. 1775. [E♭ major, D major, C major, B♭ major, G major, F major]
- 6 sonatas for violin and keyboard in a manuscript dated 1777 in the České Muzeum Hudby in Prague [D major, F major, E♭ major, G major, B♭ major, E♭ major]
- 6 sonatas for violin and keyboard in an undated manuscript in the České Muzeum Hudby in Prague [D major, G major, C major, B♭ major, F major, C major]

Sonatas for two cellos

- 6 sonatas for two cellos and a bass line in an undated manuscript in the České Muzeum Hudby in Prague [A major, D major, G major, F major, C major, B♭ major]

Sonata for violin, cello, and bass

- 1 sonata in G major for violin, cello, and a bass line in an undated manuscript in the České Muzeum Hudby in Prague

Duets for two flutes

- 6 duets for two flutes and a bass line in an undated manuscript in the private collection of Antonio Venturi in Montecatini-Terme, Italy [G major, C major, A minor, E minor, D major, B♭ major]

Trios for flute, violin, and cello

- Sei trii per flauto, violino, e violoncello. Florence: Del Vivo, c. 1778 [D major, G major, C major, A major, F major, B♭ major]

String trios

- 1 trio for 2 violins and cello in E♭ major in the Music Library of the University of California at Berkeley (remnant of a set of six advertised in the Breitkopf catalog of 1767)
- Six sonates, op. 1, for 2 violins and cello published by La Chevardière in Paris c. 1768 [C major, A major, D major, F major, A major, E♭ major]
- Four of the trios in the Op. 1 set of La Chevardière also appear in Six Orchestra Trios for Two Violins and a Violoncello (London: Welcker, c. 1772), but the English print also contains two new trios [G major, B♭ major]
- Six sonates, op. 1, for 2 violins and cello published by La Menu in Paris in 1772 [C major, G major, E♭ major, A major, B♭ major, F major]
- 5 additional trios for 2 violins and cello survive in undated manuscripts in the České Muzeum Hudby in Prague [D major, F major, F major, G major, A major]
- 1 additional trio in E major for 2 violins and cello (remnant of an original set of six) survives in the Biblioteca Antoniana in Padua

Trio for violin, cello, and string bass

- 1 trio in G major for this combination of instruments survives in the České Muzeum Hudby

String quartets

- Sei quartetti a due violini alto e basso, op. 3. Paris: La Chervardière; Lyon: Castaud, c. 1768. [A major, F major, B♭ major, G major, E♭ major, C major]
- Sei quartetti a due violini, viola e violoncello, op. 1. Offenbach: Johann André, 1777. [E♭ major, C major, D major, F major, B♭ major, G major]
- Six quatuors à deux violons, taille et basse, op. post. Berlin: Hummel, c. 1781.

String quintets

- VI Sinfonie concertanti o sia quintetti per due violini, due viole, e basso, Op. 2. Paris: Venier; Lyon: Castaud, c. 1767. [B♭ major, E major, G major, A major, D major, C major]
- 6 string quintets in an undated manuscript in the Biblioteca Estense in Modena [G major, E♭ major, C major, A major, F major, B♭ major]

Wind quintets

- 6 quintets for 2 oboes, 2 horns, and bassoon in undated manuscripts in the Santini-Bibliothek in Münster, probably composed in Rome in 1780 or 1781 [D major, G major, E♭ major, B♭ major, F major, C major]

Wind octets

- 3 octets for 2 oboes, 2 clarinets, 2 horns, and 2 bassoons in undated manuscripts from the Fürstlich Fürstenburgische Hofbibliothek in Donaueschingen, probably composed in Munich in 1777 or 1778 [E♭ major, E♭ major, B♭ major]

Oboe quintets

- 6 quintets for oboe with string quartet in an undated manuscript in the Biblioteca Comunale in Treviso [B♭ major, D major, F major, C major, A major, E♭ major]

Miscellaneous work for wind instruments

- "Cassation" for 2 clarinets & horn in B flat major in an undated manuscript in the Rossijskaja Nacional'naja Biblioteka in St. Petersburg

Concertos

- Violin Concerto in D major cited in the Breitkopf catalog of 1769, preserved in an undated manuscript in the České Muzeum Hudby in Prague
- Violin Concerto in C major cited in the Breitkopf catalog of 1770, preserved in an undated manuscript in the Thüringesches Hauptstaatsarchiv in Weimar, the original version of the Cello Concerto in C major
- Violin Concerto in C major preserved in an undated manuscripts in the České Muzeum Hudby in Prague and other archives
- Six violin concertos preserved in an undated manuscript in the Gesellschaft der Musikfreunde in Vienna, almost certainly composed by 1772 [E major, A major, F major, B♭ major, D major, G major]
- Cello Concerto in C major preserved in an undated manuscript in the Gesellschaft der Musikfreunde in Vienna, an arrangement of a violin concerto preserved in Weimar
- Flute Concerto in D major preserved in an undated manuscript in the Biblioteka Uniwersytecka in Wrocław
- 2 Keyboard Concertos preserved in undated manuscripts in the Bibliothèque Nationale in Paris
- 3 concertos for wind quintet & orchestra in undated manuscripts in the library of the Monumento Nazionale di Montecassino

Symphonies

- No. 1 - Symphony in C major dated 1762 in a manuscript preserved in the České Muzeum Hudby in Prague
- Nos. 2-7 – Six symphonies [D major, G major, C major, D major, G minor, D major] preserved in the print VI Sinfonie a quattro, Op. 1 (Nuremberg: Johann Ulrich Haffner, [c. 1763])
- No. 8 – Symphony in D major cited in a 1766 catalog of the musical holdings of the court of Sigmaringen
- Nos. 9-10 – Two symphonies [G major, D major] cited in a 1768 catalog of the musical holdings of the Benedictine monastery of Lambach
- Nos. 11-12 – Two symphonies [D major, E♭ major] offered for sale in the Breitkopf catalog of 1769
- No. 13 – Symphony in D major dated 1769 in a manuscript in the Moravské Zemské Muzeum in Brno
- No. 14 – Symphony in G major dated 1770 in a catalog of the musical holdings of the Benedictine monastery in Göttweig
- No. 15 – Symphony in F major preserved in a manuscript of c. 1770 in the Fürstlich Thurn und Taxis Hofbibliothek in Regensburg
- No. 16 – Symphony in B♭ major preserved in a manuscript of c. 1770 in the České Muzeum Hudby in Prague
- No. 17 – Symphony in G major preserved in a manuscript collection from the early 1770s in the Music Division of the Library of Congress in Washington, D.C.
- No. 18 - Symphony in F major preserved in a manuscript of c. 1771 in the České Muzeum Hudby in Prague
- Nos. 19-25 – Seven symphonies [C major, D major, D major, F major, C major, D major, F major] cited in a 1771 catalog of the musical holdings of Stift Vorau [the music for Nos. 23-25 is lost]
- Nos. 26-31 – Six symphonies [C major, A major, F major, D major, B♭ major, G major] preserved in the print Six Overtures (London: William Napier, [c. 1772])
- Nos. 32-35 – Four symphonies [D major, E♭ major, A major, B♭ major] cited in an Austrian catalog of unidentifiable origins compiled c. 1775
- Nos. 36-41 – Six symphonies [D major, B♭ major, G major, E♭ major, C major, F major] offered for sale in the Breitkopf catalog of 1776/77 [all of which are lost]
- Nos. 42-47 – Six symphonies [C major, D major, E♭ major, F major, G major, B♭ major] dated 1778 in manuscripts from the library of the Pfarrkirche in Weyarn
- No. 48 – Symphony in D major dated 1780 in a manuscript in the Biblioteca Civica Girolamo Tartarotti in Rovereto
- Nos. 49-53 - Five symphonies [C major, D major, F major, F major, G major] preserved in manuscripts of c. 1780 in the České Muzeum Hudby in Prague
- No. 54 – Symphony in E♭ major preserved in an undated manuscript in the České Muzeum Hudby in Prague
- No. 55 – Symphony in G major preserved in an undated manuscript in the Biblioteca Estense in Modena

Overtures

- Overtures are preserved for all of the Mysliveček operas and oratorios that survive in score, most of them disseminated in manuscript and printed form to be performed as separate instrumental pieces. A complete listing of sources is presented in Freeman, Josef Mysliveček. The most significant print of overtures is the Sei sinfonie da orchestra published by Ranieri del Vivo in Florence c. 1777, the first anthology of symphonic works ever known to have been published in Italy.

=== Operas ===
- See List of operas by Josef Mysliveček.

=== Miscellaneous secular dramatic works ===
- Il Parnaso confuso (c. 1765), dramatic cantata
- Elfrida (1774), play with choruses (lost)
- Das ausgerechnete Glück (1777), children's operetta (lost)
- Theodorich und Elisa (c. 1777), melodrama

=== Oratorios ===
- Il Tobia (Padua, 1769)
- I pellegrini al sepolcro (Padua, 1770) - music lost
- Giuseppe riconosciuto (Padua, c. 1770) - music lost
- Adamo ed Eva (Florence, 1771)
- La Betulia liberata (Padua, 1771) - music lost
- La passione di Nostro Signore Gesù Cristo (Florence, 1773)
- La liberazione d'Israele (1773 – c. 1774) - music lost, perhaps composed in Naples, first recorded performance in Prague in 1775
- Isacco, figura del redentore (Florence, 1776; revised for a performance in Munich in March 1777 known to Mozart under the title Abramo ed Isacco)

=== Other vocal works ===
Secular cantatas

- Cantata per S.E. Marino Cavalli (1768) - lost
- Narciso al fonte (1768) - lost
- Cantata a 2 (by 1771)
- Enea negl'Elisi (1777) - lost
- Armida
- Ebbi, non ti smarir
- Non, non turbati, o Nice
- 6 birthday cantatas written between 1767 and 1779 during his stays in Naples - lost

Arias

- "Ah che fugir ... Se il ciel mi chi rida";
- 3 duetti notturni (2 vv, insts)

Sacred works

- Veni sponsa Christi (1771)
- Lytanie laurentanae
- Offertorium Beatus Bernardy

== Recordings ==
- Sinfonias, Prague Chamber Orchestra, Musica Antiqua Bohemica, 1981
- Il Bellerofonte. Prague Chamber Orchestra cond. Zoltán Peskó, Supraphon, 1990
- Sinfonia in C/Cello Concerto/Aria in Dis-Octet for Wind, Virtuosi Di Praga cond. O. Vlček, Clara – 57 010-2, 1992
- Six Sonatas for Two Cellos and Bass, J. Širc, R. Širc: Cellos; V. Hoskavec: Double Bass; R. Hugo: Harpsichord, Studio Matouš – MK 0019 - 2 131, 1994
- Sei Trii per Flauto, Violino e Violoncello, Accademia Farnese, Mondo Musica – MM 96022, 1996
- String Quintets, Pro Arte Antiqua Praha, Arta Records – F10071, 1997
- Il divino boemo - Josef Mysliveček - Symphonies, Concerto Koln, Archiv Produktion – 477 6418, Archiv Produktion – 00289 477 6418, 2007
- Il Medonte. L'Arte del Mondo cond. Werner Ehrhardt, Deutsche Harmonia Mundi – 88697861242, Sony Music – 88697861242, 2011
- L'Olimpiade. Teatro Comunale di Bologna Orchestra and Choir cond. Oliver von Dohnányi, Bongiovanni – GB 2469702, 2014
- Adamo ed Eva. Il Gardellino cond. Peter Van Heyghen, Passacaille – 1053, 2019
- Complete Keyboard Works, Marius Bartoccini: fortepiano, Brilliant Classics – 95864, 2024

== In popular culture ==
Mysliveček's life inspired the romanetto Il Divino Boemo (1884) by Czech author Jakub Arbes and the opera Il Divino Boemo (1912) by the blind Czech composer Stanislav Suda.

A documentary film about the genesis of the 2013 Prague production of Mysliveček's opera L'Olimpiade, produced by Mimesis Film and directed by Petr Václav, was released in 2015 under the title Zpověď zapomenutého (Confession of the Vanished). It was a winner of the Trilobit Beroun award of 2016.

The film Il Boemo (2022), directed by Petr Václav, is a full-length biopic based on incidents from the composer's life, where he was portrayed by Vojtěch Dyk. It was selected by the Czech Republic as its entry for the Academy Award for Best International Feature Film for the 95th Academy Awards.

== See also ==
- Mozart in Italy

== Sources ==
- Freeman, Daniel E. Josef Mysliveček, "Il Boemo". Minneapolis: Calumet Editions, 2022. ISBN 978-1-959770-16-9
- Evans, Angela, and Robert Dearling. Josef Mysliveček (1737–1781): a Thematic Catalogue of His Instrumental and Orchestral Works. Munich and Salzburg: Katzbichler, 1999. ISBN 3-87397-132-1
- Wakin, Daniel J. "A Composer Forgotten to All but Mozart," New York Times, 4 March 2007.
