= Dramma per musica =

Libretto for an opera

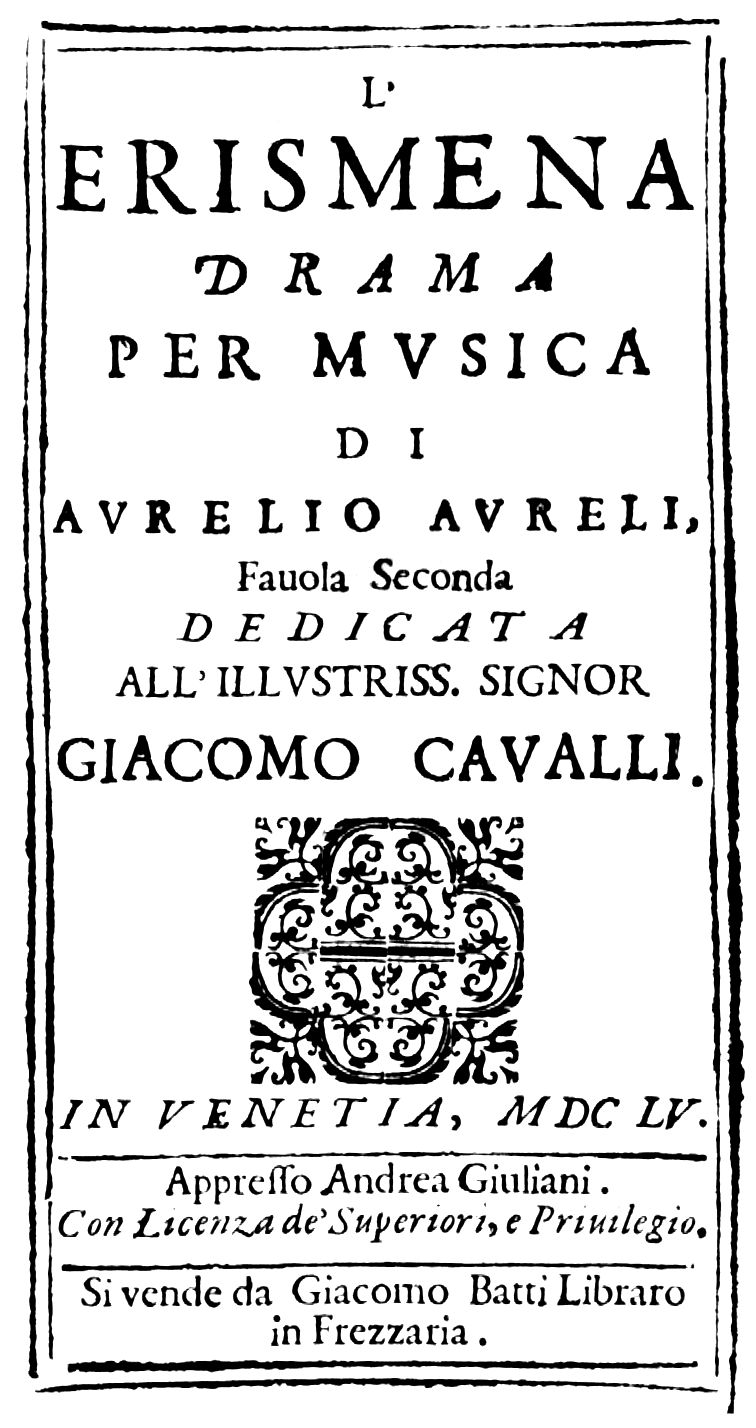
Title page of a 1655 dramma per musica, L'Erismena.

The phrase dramma per musica (also spelled drama per musica; Italian, literally: 'play (or drama) for music', plural: drammi per musica) is commonly found after the title in Italian opera librettos beginning in the 17th century and continuing into the 18th century. It indicates that the text was intended to be set to music by a composer. By extension it has also been used to refer to the musical setting itself, but this is less common.

In the 18th century, dramma per musica came to be most commonly used for librettos of serious Italian operas, today known as opera seria (a term that was little-used when they were created), while the term dramma giocoso began to be used for the librettos of comic operas.

Examples of librettos having the label dramma per musica are those for Cavalli's Xerse (1654) and Erismena (1655), Vivaldi's Tito Manlio (1719), Mysliveček's Il Bellerofonte (1767), Gluck's Paride ed Elena (1770), Salieri's Armida (1779), Mozart's Idomeneo (1781) and Rossini's Otello (1816), as well as numerous libretti written by Pietro Metastasio.

Variant phrases, such as dramma in musica, which emphasised the musical setting, or dramma musicale, are also seen. Sometimes recent authors have used these phrases to mean 'drama through music', referring to the "musico-dramatic effects achieved by the composer".

== See also ==
- music drama
- melodramma
- melodrama
