= Ridente la calma =

1785 aria arrangement as song by W. A. Mozart

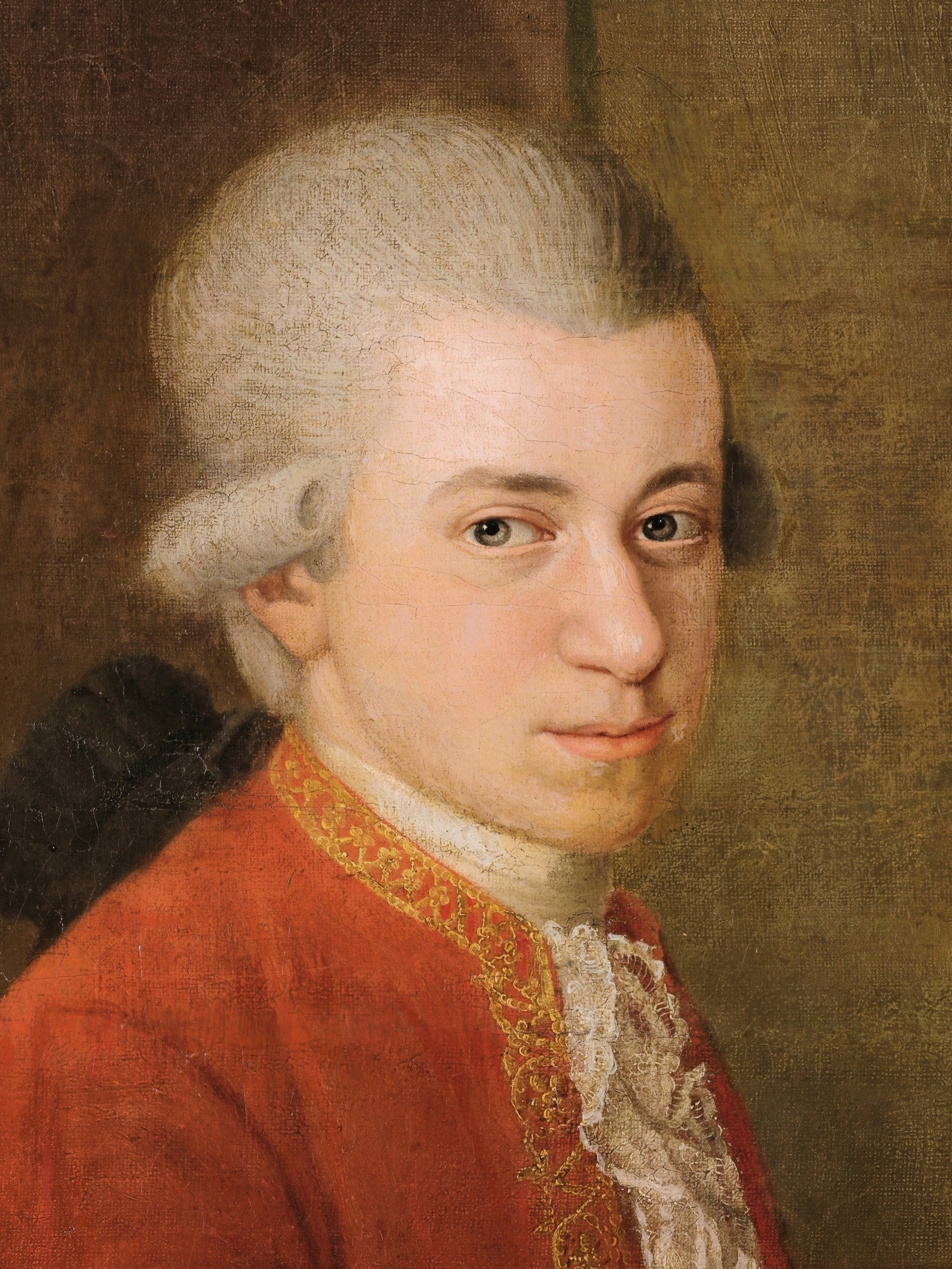
Detail from Portrait of the Mozart Family, c. 1781

"Ridente la calma", K. Anh.A 36 (formerly K. 152 and 210a), is an arrangement (or transcription) for voice and piano by Wolfgang Amadeus Mozart of an operatic aria whose music was originally written by Josef Mysliveček with the words "Il caro mio bene" for his opera Armida of 1780. It has long been a favorite of soprano singers worldwide, its purity and simplicity the perfect embodiment of a "reformed" style of Italian vocal composition that rose to prominence in Europe beginning in the 1760s. These same qualities have also made it attractive for pedagogical use, and it remains a staple of vocal recitals in intermediate and advanced levels. Still widely disseminated in music collections interspersed among original Mozart compositions for voice and piano as one of the most recognizable examples of late 18th-century vocal music of its type, "Ridente la calma" constitutes the most familiar example of Mysliveček's writing style presently in circulation. The circumstances surrounding the preparation of Mozart's arrangement have long been notably mysterious and complicated, but recent research has yielded important new clues.

== Origins and stylistic profile ==
No autograph manuscript for Mozart's "Ridente la calma" survives. The earliest mention of it in the Mozart documentation is a letter of Constanze Mozart written to the Leipzig publisher Breitkopf & Härtel on 25 February 1799. In this letter, Constanze offered Breitkopf & Härtel 21 miscellaneous compositions by her late husband for sale, among them "Ridente la calma". Breitkopf & Härtel published the piece the same year in a volume of Lieder for voice and piano. Since the manuscript used as the basis for the edition was somehow lost, there is no record of what Mozart considered its genre to be. The designation canzonetta, now the customary means of identifying the genre of the work, was introduced in the early 20th century. In the original thematic catalogue of Mozart's compositions published by Ludwig Köchel, it was numbered 152 with a suggested date of 1772 (as it turns out, much too early). The basis for this date was likely the simplicity of the musical materials and its archaic dal segno aria form, a type common in Italian opera of the mid-1760s to mid-1770s that was a variant of the older da capo aria form, or A–B–A form, in which the customary repetition of the opening A section is substantially abbreviated. The dating may also have been influenced by the opinion of Otto Jahn that it "would fit quite well in one of [Mozart's] older Italian operas" (i.e., his Italian operas of the first half of the 1770s). In the early 20th century, there was a feeling among certain Mozart scholars that the piece might have been from a slightly later period, perhaps 1772 to 1776, and in the third edition of the Köchel catalog edited by Alfred Einstein, the number assigned to it was 210a, a higher number to reflect a later chronological framework. Sensibly, "Ridente la calma" was removed from the main body of the Köchel catalogue in its latest edition and placed in Anhang A (Appendix A) among arrangements of works by other composers.

For over a century, "Ridente la calma" was accepted as a genuine composition of Mozart in all respects with little dispute, but in 1929, Georges de Saint-Foix published an article that demonstrated the vocal piece to be an arrangement of the aria "Il caro mio bene" by Mysliveček, which he discovered in a portfolio of Mysliveček arias in the music collection of the Conservatoire de Paris. The manuscript included no dating of the aria nor any indication of an opera in which it might have been used. Collations of Mysliveček's vocal music prepared in the 1980s and 1990s by Stanislav Bohadlo and Daniel E. Freeman revealed that "Il caro mio bene" is associated with the opera Armida without any evidence that it was composed earlier than the première of the work for carnival operatic season of 1780 at the Teatro alla Scala in Milan (i.e., with a première just after Christmas of 1779).

The unusual stylistic profile of "Il caro mio bene" is attributable to Mysliveček's close personal connections with the renowned castrato soprano Luigi Marchesi (who appeared in Mysliveček's opera Ezio and oratorio Isacco, figura del redentore in Munich in 1777, then brought him to Naples for the 1778/79 operatic season to appear in Mysliveček's La Calliroe and L'Olimpiade in roles that established him permanently as a great operatic figure in Italy and led to singing engagements all over Europe. Before arriving in Milan at the end of 1779 to sing the role of Rinaldo in Armida, Marchesi had appeared both in Mysliveček's opera La Circe in Venice in May of the same year and Francesco Bianchi's opera Castore e Polluce in Florence in the autumn. It is known that Marchesi brought the aria "Se piangi, se peni" from Castore e Polluce with him to Milan, because it was mentioned in a press report from the 1784 as being used to replace one of the unsuccessful arias in Mysliveček's Armida after the opera had failed and Mysliveček himself had left Milan to supervise a production of his next opera, Medonte, in Rome during the same carnival operatic season of 1780. Without doubt, it would have been used to replace Mysliveček's aria "Il caro mio bene" at the beginning of act 3. Marchesi achieved notable success in Milan with Bianchi's "Se piangi, se peni", whose text is a parody of Metastasio's aria text "Se cerca, se dice", an outstanding vehicle for Marchesi's abilities during his appearance in Mysliveček's L'Olimpiade in Naples in 1778. Bianchi's "Se piangi, se peni" was the first of a series of small-scale arias intended to appear in the last act of operas that he carried around with him for years. It was clearly favoured greatly by Marchesi, who had already had it inserted in November 1779 into Giuseppe Sarti's Achille in Sciro, the second opera of the autumn season in Florence that year.

As can be seen by comparing the arias "Se piangi, se peni" by Bianchi and "Il caro mio bene" by Mysliveček, the latter was clearly based closely on the former. Each is in the same key and cast in the same old-fashioned dal-segno format and share similar length, similar tempo, similar triple meter, identical instrumentation with flutes, and very similar melodic profiles. This hints at the desire of Marchesi to force the insertion of "Se piangi, se peni" into the production of Armida, which would have been a problem for Mysliveček, who was averse to permitting arias by other composers to be used in the first performances of his operas (not a single case of which has ever been identified in any of the scores prepared for his operatic premières). Instead of incorporating a Bianchi aria into his score, Mysliveček supplied Marchesi with a new aria in a similar style that conformed to the general orientation of Castore e Polluce by Bianchi, a "Franco-Italian" fusion that incorporated traits of "reform" opera as cultivated by Christoph Willibald Gluck. This explains the Frenchified mythological subject matter of Bianchi's opera and the dominance of arias of modest length with simple, "natural" melodic lines devoid of elaborate coloratura (generally a specialty of Mysliveček's arias). Although the audiences in Milan in 1780 did not care for the result that Mysliveček produced, his aria enjoyed long-term success. It circulated as an independent vocal piece attributed to Mysliveček, and Marchesi must have carried it with him as a favoured aria for years, the likely means by which the music eventually came into Mozart's hands.

A fresh expansion of theories concerning the dissemination of Mysliveček's music for the aria "Il caro mio bene" and the replacement of its text with "Ridente la calma" has recently been compiled by the Italian musicologist Lucio Tufano. Marchesi made a habit of commissioning arias of modest proportions in moderate triple meter for use in the third acts of the operas in which he appeared. As far as Mozart's arrangement "Ridente la calma" is concerned, the next important aria to be singled out is Francesco Bianchi's "Ridente la calma" as it appears in his opera Il trionfo della pace for Turin in 1782. This aria, in similar musical style to both Bianchi's earlier aria "Se piangi, se peni" and Mysliveček's "Il caro mio bene", was set to the same text as Mozart's "Ridente la calma" and now (after a very long period of mystery) can be attributed to the librettist of the opera Il trionfo della pace, Cesare Oliveri: It is an open question whether Mozart ever knew the dramatic context of the text he used in his setting, which expresses a mood of clemency and reconciliation from the character Ciro, a prince of Persia who has imprisoned defeated enemies in battle but is inclined to free them after an exhortation from the allegorical character La Pace (Peace), a deus ex machina who appears at the very end to resolve all the outstanding dramatic conflicts. In the second half of the text, Ciro turns to his beloved Ariene, daughter of one of the prisoners to be released, to confirm that they may now be together.

Ridente la calma,
Nell'alma si desti,
Nè resti si più segno
Di sdegno, e timor.

Tu vieni frattanto
A stringer, mio bene,
Le dolci catene
Sì grate al mio cor.

As I smile, a sense of calmness
wakes in my soul;
let there be no more hint
of resentment and fear.

In the meantime, you come
to grasp, my beloved,
the sweet chains
so dear to my heart.

Mozart's setting of this same text differs little musically from the model of Mysliveček's "Il caro mio bene", but the middle of Bianchi's version seems to have been the source of some minor musical variants in the middle section of Mozart's "Ridente la calma".

The precise dating of Mozart's version of "Ridente la calma" cannot be established with certainty, but it would naturally make sense to believe that it originated from a time and place in which both Marchesi and Mozart were present at the same time. There is only one possibility for such a meeting: a short period in 1785 (perhaps in the autumn) when both men were present in Vienna during the preparations and performance of Giuseppe Sarti's opera Giulio Sabino, in which Marchesi appeared. There is no record, however, of Marchesi's activities in Vienna at this time other than his performance in the opera, and there is no documentary confirmation that Mozart ever met Marchesi in his entire life. The latest edition of the Köchel catalogue specifies the date of composition of Mozart's arrangement "Il caro mio bene" as "presumably around 1785" in Vienna.

It is strange that several different texts of the final-act arias carried around by Marchesi in the 1780s could be underlaid to varying musical settings, but they all had similar poetic structures. The texts of Bianchi's "Se piangi, se peni" and "Ridente la calma" and Mysliveček's "Il caro mio bene" could all be underlaid interchangeably to the music for any of these three arias. This created an unusual choice for Mozart to be ale create an arrangement by selecting either the text or the music among multiple arias supplied to him by Marchesi. It was clearly a sign of Mozart's continued regard for the talents of his old friend Mysliveček that he chose to match his music with the text "Ridente la calma" from a Bianchi aria with hardly with any of Bianchi's musical ideas being used at all. It is possible to explain the choice of Bianchi's text as a reference of regret over Mozart's estrangement with Mysliveček in the year 1778. After cultivating a close relationship, Mysliveček betrayed Mozart and his father by promising to arrange an operatic commission for Mozart in Naples in return for his father's assistance in obtaining commissions for musical compositions from the archbishop of Salzburg. Mozart's father came through with his part of the deal, but Mysliveček did not, which ended contacts with the Mozart family permanently. The reference in the text "Ridente la calma" to the cessation of feelings of "resentment" (or "indignation") could provide an explanation for Mozart's choice of the text as a way of expressing regret over his estrangement with Mysliveček, even though Mozart was entirely blameless in the matter. This can only be a matter of speculation for the present time.
