= Armida (Mysliveček) =

Opera by Josef Mysliveček

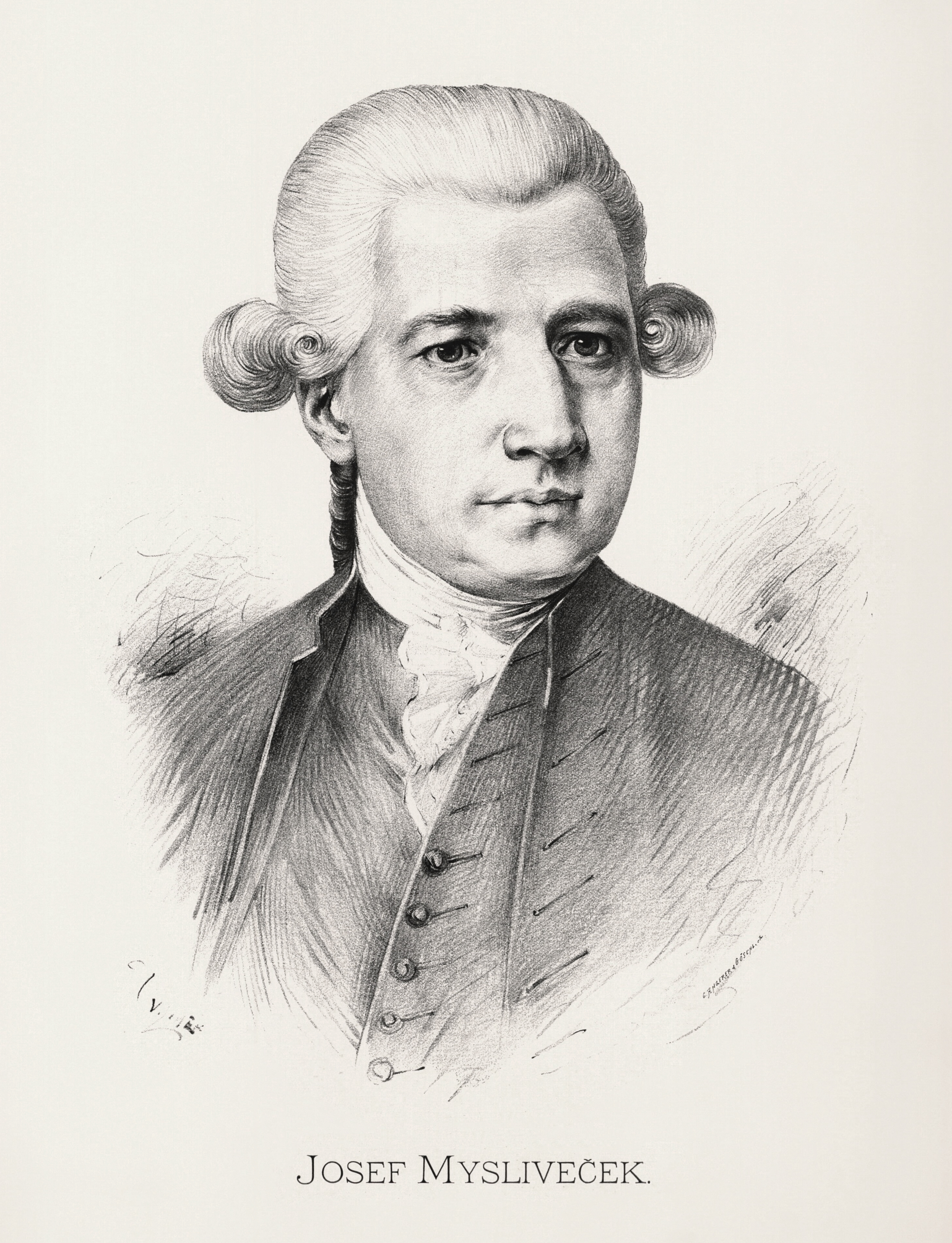
Josef Mysliveček

Armida is an opera in three acts by Josef Mysliveček set to a libretto by Giovanni Ambrogio Migliavacca based on an earlier libretto by Philippe Quinault. It is one of many operas set at the time of the Crusades that is based on characters and incidents from Torquato Tasso's epic poem La Gerusalemme liberata. This opera (and all the rest of Mysliveček's operas) belong to the serious type in Italian language referred to as opera seria that usually carried the designation dramma per musica in librettos. It incorporates many elements from the operatic "reform" movement of the 1770s, including short vocal numbers and short choruses incorporated into the fabric of the drama and lavish use of accompanied recitative.

== Performance history ==
The opera was first performed at the Teatro alla Scala in Milan on 26 December 1779 to open the theater's operatic carnival season of 1780 as one of the earliest operas ever performed there. It was a spectacular failure that necessitated the substitution of many of the arias for works of Giuseppe Sarti and Francesco Bianchi. The first performance of the opera since its first run in Milan took place in Lisbon on 22 May 2015 in the form of a semi scenic version sponsored by the Orquestra Metropolitana de Lisboa.

There is no reason to believe that an anonymous production of Armida staged in Lucca in 1778 made use of any of Mysliveček's music, in spite of multiple claims in the musicological literature that it constituted the original version of the Milan opera of 1780.

== Connection with Mozart ==
The aria “Il caro mio bene” from Armida is the basis of Mozart's arrangement (or transcription) “Ridente la calma”, K. Anh.A 36 (formerly K. 152 and 210a), a work for voice and piano that is often referred to as a canzonetta. The circumstances surrounding the preparation of Mozart’s arrangement have long been complicated and mysterious, but recent research has yielded important new clues. No autograph manuscript for Mozart’s “Ridente la calma” survives. The earliest mention of it in the Mozart documentation is a letter of Constanze Mozart written to the Leipzig publisher Breitkopf & Härtel on 25 February 1799. In this letter, Constanze offered Breitkopf & Härtel 21 miscellaneous compositions by her late husband for sale, among them “Ridente la calma.” Breitkopf & Härtel published the piece the same year in a volume of Lieder for voice and piano.

In the original thematic catalogue of Mozart’s compositions published by Ludwig Köchel, it was numbered 152 with a suggested composition date of 1772. The basis for this early date was likely the simplicity of the musical materials and its archaic dal segno aria format. In the early 20th century, there was a feeling among certain Mozart scholars that the piece might have been from a slightly later period, perhaps 1772-76, and in the third edition of the Köchel catalog edited by Alfred Einstein, the number assigned to it was 210a, a higher number to reflect a later chronological framework. Sensibly, “Ridente la calma” was removed from the main body of the Köchel catalogue in its latest edition and placed in Anhang (Appendix) A among arrangements of works by other composers.

In 1929, Georges de Saint-Foix published an article that demonstrated “Ridente la calma” to be an arrangement of the aria “Il caro mio bene” by Mysliveček, which he discovered in a portfolio of arias found in the music collection of the Conservatoire de Paris. The manuscript included no dating of the aria nor any indication of an opera that it might have been used in. Collations of Mysliveček’s vocal music prepared in the 1980s and 1990s by Stanislav Bohadlo and Daniel E. Freeman revealed that “Il caro mio bene” is associated with the opera Armida without any evidence that it was composed earlier than the première of the work for carnival 1780 at the Teatro alla Scala in Milan.

The stylistic profile of “Il caro mio bene” is attributable to Mysliveček’s close personal connections with the renowned castrato soprano Luigi Marchesi (who appeared in Mysliveček’s opera Ezio and oratorio Isacco, figura del redentore in Munich in 1777, then was brought to Naples for the 1778-79 operatic season to appear in Mysliveček’s La Calliroe and L’Olimpiade in roles that established him permanently as a great operatic figure in Italy and led to singing engagements all over Europe. Before arriving in Milan at the end of 1779 to sing the role of Rinaldo in Armida, Marchesi had appeared both in Mysliveček’s opera La Circe in Venice in May of the same year and Francesco Biachi’s opera Castore e Polluce in Florence in the autumn. It is known that Marchesi brought the aria “Se piangi, se peni” from Castore e Polluce with him to Milan, because it was mentioned in a press report from the 1784 as being used to replace one of the unsuccessful arias in Mysliveček’s Armida after the opera had failed and Mysliveček himself had left Milan to supervise a production of his next opera, Medonte, in Rome during the same carnival operatic season of 1780. Marchesi achieved notable success in Milan with Bianchi’s “Se piangi, se peni.” It was clearly favored greatly by Marchesi, who had already had it inserted in November 1779 into Giuseppe Sarti’s Achille in Sciro, the second opera of the autumn season in Florence that year.

As can be seen by comparing the arias “Se piangi, se peni” by Bianchi and “Il caro mio bene” by Mysliveček, the latter was clearly based closely on the former. Each is in the same key and same old-fashioned dal-segno format and share similar length, similar tempo, similar triple meter, and very similar melodic profiles. This hints at the desire of Marchesi to force the insertion of “Se piangi, se peni” into the production of Armida, which would have been a problem for Mysliveček, who was averse to permitting arias by other composers to be used in the first performances of his operas (not a single case of which has ever been identified in any of the scores prepared for his operatic premières). Instead of incorporating a Bianchi aria into his score, Mysliveček supplied Marchesi with a new aria in a similar style that conformed to the general orientation of Castore e Polluce by Bianchi, a “Franco-Italian” fusion that incorporated traits of “reform” opera as cultivated by Christoph Willibald Gluck. This explains the Frenchified mythological subject matter of Bianchi’s opera and the dominance of arias of modest length with simple, “natural” melodic lines devoid of elaborate coloratura (generally a specialty of Mysliveček’s arias). Although the audiences in Milan in 1780 did not care for the result that Mysliveček produced, his aria enjoyed long-term success. It circulated as an independent vocal piece attributed to Mysliveček, and Marchesi must have carried it with him as a favored aria for years, the likely means by which its music eventually came into Mozart’s hands.

A fresh expansion of theories concerning the dissemination of Mysliveček’s music for the aria “Il caro mio bene” and the replacement of its text with “Ridente la calma” has recently been compiled by the Italian musicologist Lucio Tufano. Marchesi made a habit of commissioning arias of modest proportions in moderate triple meter for use in the third acts of the operas in which he appeared. As far as Mozart’s arrangement “Ridente la calma” is concerned, the next important aria to be singled out is Francesco Bianchi’s “Ridente la calma” as it appears in his opera Il trionfo della pace for Turin in 1782. This aria, in similar musical style to both Bianchi’s earlier aria “Se piangi, se peni” and Mysliveček’s “Il caro mio bene,” was set to the same text as Mozart’s “Ridente la calma”. Mozart’s musical setting differs little from the model of Mysliveček’s “Il caro mio bene”, but the middle section of Bianchi’s "Ridente la calma" seems to have been the source of some musical features of the middle section of Mozart’s version of the same text.

The precise dating of Mozart’s version of “Ridente la calma” cannot be established with certainty, but it would naturally make sense to believe that it originated from a time and place in which both Marchesi and Mozart were present simultaneously. There is only one possibility for such a meeting: a short period in 1785 (perhaps in the autumn) when both men were present in Vienna during the preparations and performance of Giuseppe Sarti’s opera Giulio Sabino, in which Marchesi appeared. There is no record, however, of Marchesi’s activities in Vienna at this time other than his performance in the opera, and there is no documentary confirmation that Mozart ever met Marchesi. The latest edition of the Köchel catalogue specifies the date of composition of Mozart’s arrangement of “Il caro mio bene” as “presumably around 1785” in Vienna.

Mozart’s arrangement "Ridente la calma" remains one of the most recognizable compositions for voice and piano from the late 18th century - Its music, borrowed from Mysliveček’s aria “Il caro mio bene”, is the most familiar example of Mysliveček's writing style presently heard.

== Roles ==
Role	Voice type	Premiere cast 26 December 1779 Teatro alla Scala, Milan
Armida, a sorceress, hereditary princess of the kingdom of Syria	soprano	Caterina Gabrielli
Rinaldo, the most renowned of the knights of Goffredo	soprano castrato	Luigi Marchesi
Fenicia, a confidante of Armida; and Lucinda	soprano	Caterina Lorenzini
Sidonia, a confidante of Armida; and Melissa	alto	Rosa Franchi
Idraote, a sorcerer, uncle of Armida, and king of Damascus; Odio; and the Cavalier Danese, a companion of Ubaldo	tenor	Valentin Adamberger
Aronte, overseer of the prisoners of Armida; Artemidoro, one of Armida's prisoners; and Ubaldo, an envoy to Rinaldo	soprano castrato	Gaetano Quistapace

== Vocal set pieces ==
(taken from the score in the Ajuda Palace in Lisbon,
the only complete score of the opera)

Act I, scene 1 - Aria of Fenicia, "Perche d'affano oppressa"
Act I, scene 2 - Aria of Sidonia, "Vuoi che turbi"
Act I, scene 3 - Aria of Armida, "So che amor lusinga"
Act I, scene 4 - Aria of Idraote, "Molto soffrir condanna"
Act I, scene 6 - Chorus with Fenicia, "L'orme seguiam d'Armida"
Act I, scene 7 - Duet for Armida and Idraote, "Ah, del fellon nel sangue"
Act I, scene 8 - Aria of Rinaldo, "Dal mio core amor"
Act I, scene 8 - Accompanied recitative for Idraote, "Qui si dimori"
Act I, scene 9 - Accompanied recitative for Rinaldo, "Più queste spiaggie"
Act I, scene 9 - Aria of Rinaldo, "Più non vi sento in seno"
Act I, scene 10 - Aria of Artemidoro, "Se amica vuoi la sorte"
Act I, scene 10 - Chorus with naiad and shepherdess, "Nel più felice tempo"
Act I, scene 11 - Accompanied recitative for Armida, "Qual turbame"
Act I, scene 11 - Aria of Armida, "Cedo l'armi il cor"

Act II, scene 1 - Aria of Ubaldo, "Di luce un raggio"
Act II, scene 3 - Aria of Fenicia, "Arta vanta d'ogn'altra maggiore"
Act II, scene 4 - Aria of Rinaldo, "Ah, disponi di mia sorte"
Act II, scene 5 - Accompanied recitative for Armida, "Vieni, odio implacabile"
Act II, scene 5 - Chorus of furies
Act II, scene 6 - Aria of Armida, "Se il mio duolo, se il mio fato"
Act II, scene 7 - Aria of Odio, "Mi chiamerai ma in vano"
Act II, scene 9 - Chorus with Lucinda, "Ecco la calma"
Act II, scene 9 - Cavatina of Lucinda, "Qui senza stento"
Act II, scene 9 - Duet for Lucinda and the Cavalier Danese, "Qual v'a più bel piacer"
Act II, scene 11 - Cavatina of Melissa, "Perche veder deggio"
Act II, scene 11 - Aria of Ubaldo, "Ah, troppo barbara ragion tiranna"
Act II, scene 12 - Duet for Armida and Rinaldo, "È felice la mia sorte"

Act III, scene 1 - Aria for an "Amante fortunata" with chorus, "Il piacer tranquillo"
Act III, scene 1 - Aria of Rinaldo, "Il caro mio bene"
Act III, scene 2 - Aria of the Cavalier Danese, "Vieni ormai"
Act III, scene 3 - Aria of Armida, "Idol mio, serena i rai e consola il tuo dolor"
Act III, scene 4 - Accompanied recitative for Armida, "Il traditor Rinaldo"

== Bibliography ==
- Freeman, Daniel E. Josef Mysliveček, "Il Boemo." Minneapolis: Calumet Editions, 2022. ISBN 978-1-959770-16-9
