= Luigi Marchesi =

Italian opera singer (1754–1829)

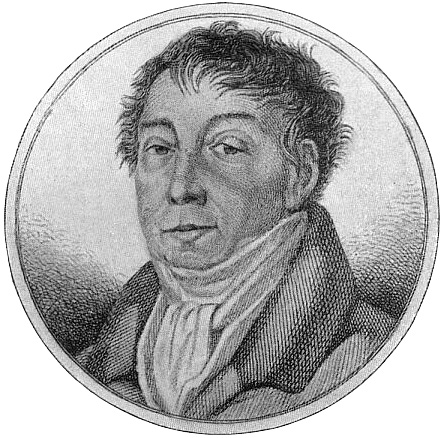
Luigi Marchesi in retirement

Luigi Marchesi (Italian pronunciation: [luˈiːdʒi marˈkeːzi]; 8 August 1754 – 14 December 1829) was an Italian castrato singer, one of the most prominent and charismatic to appear in Europe during the second half of the eighteenth century.

== Biography ==
Luigi Ludovico Marchesi was born in Milan. He joined the Milan Cathedral choir in 1765 and made his operatic debut in Rome in 1773 at the Teatro delle Dame, cast as a female character, in Marcello da Capua's comic opera La contessina. For several years, Marchesi appeared either in minor roles or minor operatic centers, but he found a valuable ally in the Czech composer Josef Mysliveček after he appeared in the latter's opera Ezio and oratorio Isacco, figura del redentore in Munich early in the year 1777. Marchesi's singing in both productions was considered to be extraordinary. In a letter written by Wolfgang Amadeus Mozart to his father from Munich on 11 October 1777, it is mentioned that Mysliveček bragged of his influence with the management of the Teatro San Carlo in Naples, the most prestigious venue for the performance of Italian serious opera in Europe: he apparently had the power to recommend the engagement of singers who were to be featured in productions planned for the 1778–79 operatic season there. Marchesi was one of the singers that Mysliveček recommended. His first appearances in Naples were as successful as those in Munich, and they permanently established him as one of the most talented vocal artists in Italy. In all, Mysliveček created five operatic roles for Marchesi before his premature death in 1781. His performance of Giuseppe Sarti's rondò "Mia speranza io pur vorrei" as a substitute aria during the disastrous run of Armida at La Scala in the carnival operatic season of 1780 caused a sensation.

After Marchesi's triumphs throughout Italy in the late 1770s and early 1780s, he ventured all the way to Vienna, St. Petersburg, and London, where he left extraordinary impressions and was proclaimed to be the greatest singer of his time. In Vienna, he likely met both Mozart and Salieri. In London he was billed as Virtuoso di Camera to his Sicilian Majesty. The Earl of Mount Edgcumbe described Marchesi's impression at London as following:

Marchesi was at this time (1788) a very well-looking young man, of good figure, and graceful deportment. His acting was spirited and expressive: his vocal powers were very great, his voice of extensive compass, but a little inclined to be thick. His execution was very considerable, and he was rather too fond of displaying it; nor was his cantabile singing equal to his bravura. In recitative, and scenes of energy and passion, he was incomparable, and had he been less lavish of ornaments, which were not always appropriate, and possessed a more pure and simple taste, his performance would have been faultless: it was always striking, animated and effective. He chose for his début Sarti's beautiful opera of Giulio Sabino, in which all the songs of the principal character, and they are many and various, are of the very finest description....
He was received with rapturous applause.

In 1796, Marchesi refused to sing for Napoleon when he entered the city of Milan. For this Marchesi was honored as a national hero by the public, as reported by Vernon Lee:

The frivolous part of society chatted and danced, and adored.... the singer Marchesi whom Alfieri called upon to buckle on his helmet, and march out against the French, as the only remaining Italian who dared to resist the 'Corsican Gallis' invader, although only in the matter of song.

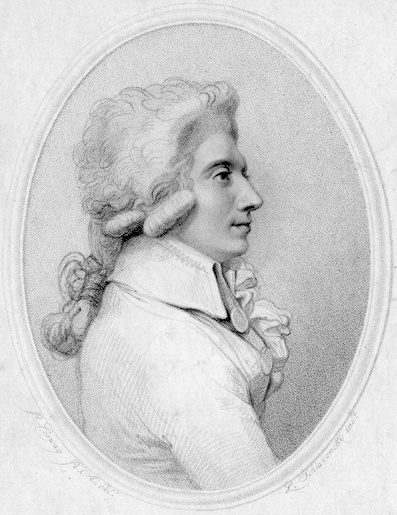
Luigi Marchesi

Marchesi's last major appearance was in Simon Mayr's Ginevra di Scozia for the inauguration of the Teatro Nuovo in Trieste (1801). He continued to appear in public for a few more years, until 1806, when he retired for good and moved to his villa at Inzago, where he died on 14 December 1829. After his retirement Marchesi did not go into obscurity; once in a while, when in good health, he used to arrange a couple of private concerts; some of them were dedicated to charity, particularly for poor orphaned children.

As an artist, Marchesi was certainly one of the greatest singers of his time, and he was also a composer. In London he published his own volume set of Ariette Italiane, and also a handful of solfeggi. He maintained a collaboration similar to that with Josef Mysliveček later in life with Angelo Tarchi and also collaborated closely with Francesco Bianchi. Perhaps his most important roles in the later part of his career were Megacle in Domenico Cimarosa's L'Olimpiade, a legacy of his noted appearance in Mysliveček's version of the same text by Metastasio, and Lovinski in Simon Mayr's La Lodoiska. Serious opera was the natural realm for his voice type, and he rarely sang comic roles after his early appearances in Rome.

In person Marchesi might have been the handsomest castrato of all time; during his London engagement in the 1790s, Maria Cosway deserted her husband and children and followed the singer around Europe for several years. At the same time, however, Marchesi became famous for his turbulent temperament and notorious stipulations. He often insisted on making his entrance on the stage descending a hill on horseback wearing a helmet with multi-coloured plumes at least a yard high, saying "Where am I?". Otherwise, he engaged in rivalry competitions that once nearly cost him life; the fanatic supporters of the soprano Luisa Todi, his bitter rival, attempted to poison him in 1791.

== Marchesi and Mozart's arrangement "Ridente la calma" ==
In spite of the enormous fame he enjoyed while he was still active as a singer, Marchesi did not create roles in any operas that have been commonly performed during the last two centuries (his most durable signature role was Lovinski in Mayr's La Lodoiska, first performed in Venice in 1796, which was produced with some frequency for only about twenty years). He was, however, instrumental in the creation of one of the best-known pieces of vocal chamber music produced in the late 18th century: “Ridente la calma”, K. Anh.A 36 (formerly K. 152 and 210a), an arrangement (or transcription) for voice and piano that was based for the most part on music by Josef Mysliveček. “Ridente la calma” first began to be widely performed in the early 20th century, and it is still familiar to soprano singers worldwide, both students and professionals, besides audiences of vocal recitals. Marchesi’s role in bringing Mysliveček’s music to Mozart’s attention has only been clarified recently, in particular due to the efforts of Daniel E. Freeman and Lucio Tufano.

The origins of Mozart’s arrangement “Ridente la calma” can be traced to Marchesi’s appearance in Francesco Bianchi's opera Castore e Polluce in Florence during the autumn operatic season of the Teatro della Pergola. The key aria in question is “Se piangi, se peni” from the final act, a vocal piece whose style matches the character of the “reform” opera in which it appears for its modest length and simple, “natural” melodic lines devoid of elaborate coloratura. Marchesi was so pleased with Bianchi’s “Se piangi, se peni” that he had it inserted into the next opera performed during the autumn season in Florence of 1779, Giuseppe Sarti’s Achille in Sciro. Marchesi then brought “Se piangi, se peni” with him to the Teatro alla Scala in Milan at the end of the year 1779, where he clearly intended to insert it into the final act of the opera Armida by his old advocate Josef Mysliveček for the carnival operatic season of 1780. It started a habit of collecting and promoting distinctive arias that Marchesi used to highlight his talents in the final acts of certain operas in which he appeared.

The actual insertion of the aria “Se piangi, se peni,” would have been a problem for Mysliveček, who was averse to permitting arias by other composers to be used in the first performances of his operas (not a single case of which has ever been identified in any of the scores prepared for his operatic premières). Instead of incorporating a Bianchi aria into his score, Mysliveček supplied Marchesi with a new short aria in simple style for the beginning of the final act of Armida: “Il caro mio bene.” Each is in the same key and same old-fashioned dal-segno format and share similar length, similar tempo, similar triple meter, the same instrumentation with flutes, and very similar melodic profiles. The audiences did not care for the result that Mysliveček produced, thus “Se piangi, se peni” made it into performances of Armida after all, as many of Mysliveček arias for the roles sung by Marchesi and Caterina Gabrielli were substituted after the composer departed for Rome to supervise the première of his next opera, Medonte. “Se piangi, se peni” was one of them. Marchesi achieved notable success in Milan with Bianchi’s “Se piangi, se peni.”

The next important aria to be singled out in the story of the origins of Mozart’s “Ridente la calma” is Francesco Bianchi’s aria “Ridente la calma” as it appears in the final act of his opera Il trionfo della pace for Turin in 1782. This aria, in similar musical style to both Bianchi’s “Se piangi, se peni” and Mysliveček’s “Il caro mio bene,” was set to the same text as Mozart’s arrangement “Ridente la calma”. Mozart’s setting of “Ridente la calma” differs little from the music found in Mysliveček’s “Il caro mio bene”, but the middle of Bianchi’s version seems to have been the source of some musical features of the middle section of Mozart’s arrangement “Ridente la calma.” Marchesi likely brought the music for the arias of Mysliveček and Bianchi (perhaps including the prototype aria “Se piangi, se peni”) to Mozart’s attention when both men were present in Vienna in 1785 during the preparations and performance of Giuseppe Sarti’s opera Giulio Sabino, in which Marchesi appeared. For unknown reasons, Mozart chose to draw inspiration mainly from Mysliveček’s music but used the text from a Bianchi aria along with some of its musical motives. The latest edition of the Köchel catalogue specifies the date of composition of Mozart’s arrangement “Il caro mio bene” as “presumably around 1785” in Vienna.

== Operatic Roles ==
- Gianetta in L'incognita perseguitata (Rome, 1773)
- Contessina Elmira in La contessina by Marcello Bernardini (Rome, 1773)
- Unidentifiable female role in Li viaggiatori by Giuseppe Scolari (Rome, 1774)
- Marchesa Violante in La finta giardiniera by Pasquale Anfossi (Rome, 1774)
- Cecchina in La buona figliuola by Niccolò Piccinni (Rome, 1774)
- Cherinto in Demofoonte by Pasquale Anfossi (Genoa, 1774)
- Unidentifiable role in an anonymous Il Demetrio (Genoa, 1774)
- Evandro in Medonte, re d'Epiro by Felice Alessandri (Milan, 1775)
- Gandarte in Alessandro nell'Indie by Carlo Monza (Milan, 1775)
- Olinto in Demetrio by Pietro Guglielmi (Venice, 1775)
- Unidentifiable role in an anonymous Demofoonte (Treviso, 1775)
- Tarquinio in Il trionfo di Clelia by Joseph Willibald Michl (Munich, 1776)
- Ezio in Ezio by Josef Mysliveček (Munich, 1777)
- Farnaspe in Adriano in Siria by Pasquale Anfossi (Padua, 1777, though listed in the libretto as still being in the service of the Maximilian III Joseph, Elector of Bavaria)
- Tarsile in La Calliroe by Josef Mysliveček (Naples, 1778)
- Aminta in Il re pastore by Ignazio Platania (Naples, 1778)
- Megacle in L'Olimpiade by Josef Mysliveček (Naples, 1778)
- Achille in Ifigenia in Aulide by Vicente Martín y Soler (Naples, 1779)
- Ulisse in La Circe by Josef Mysliveček (Venice, 1779)
- Castore in Castore e Polluce by Francesco Bianchi (Florence, 1779)
- Achille in Achille in Sciro by Giuseppe Sarti (Florence, 1779)
- Rinaldo in Armida by Josef Mysliveček (Milan, 1780)
- Timante in an anonymous Demofoonte (Pisa, 1780)
- Linceo in L'Ipermestra by Vicente Martín y Soler (Naples, 1780)
- Rinaldo in Armida abbandonata by Niccolò Jommelli (Naples, 1780)
- Amore in Amore e Psiche by Joseph Schuster (Naples, 1780)
- Arbace in Arbace by Francesco Bianchi (Naples, 1781)
- Timante in Demofoonte by Francesco Bianchi (Genoa, 1781)
- Giulio Sabino in Giulio Sabino by Giuseppe Sarti (Florence, 1781; Vienna, 1785; London, 1788)
- Timante in an anonymous Demofoonte (Siena, 1781)
- Adone in Venere e Adone by Francesco Bianchi (Florence, 1781)
- Ezio in Ezio by Felice Alessandri (Milan and Lucca, 1782; Florence, 1783)
- Megacle in L'Olimpiade by Francesco Bianchi (Milan, 1782)
- Ciro in Il trionfo della pace by Francesco Bianchi (Turin, 1782)
- Timante in an anonymous Demofoonte (Lucca, 1782)
- Ezio in Ezio by Giovanni Battista Levis (Alessandria, 1782)
- Arsace in Medonte, re di Epiro by Giuseppe Sarti (Senigallia, 1783)
- Quinto Fabio in Quinto Fabio by Luigi Cherubini (Rome, 1783)
- Arbace in Artaserse by Giacomo Rust (Rome, 1783)
- Timante in Demofoonte by Felice Alessandri (Padua, 1783)
- Piramo in Piramo e Tisbe by Giovanni Battista Borghi (Florence, 1783)
- Megacle in L'Olimpiade by Giuseppe Sarti (Rome, 1784)
- Aspard in Aspard by Francesco Bianchi (Rome, 1784)
- Poro in Alessandro nell'Indie by Luigi Cherubini (Mantua, 1784)
- Megacle in L'Olimpiade by Domenico Cimarosa (Vicenza and Lucca, 1784; London and Milan, 1788; Venice, 1790; Livorno, 1791; Vicenza, 1794; Modena, 1795)
- Arbace in Artaserse by Domenico Cimarosa (Turin, 1784)
- Achille in Achille in Sciro by Gaetano Pugnani (Turin, 1785)
- Arminio in Arminio by Angelo Tarchi (Mantua, 1785)
- Rinaldo in Armida e Rinaldo by Giuseppe Sarti (St. Petersburg, 1786)
- Castore in Castore e Polluce by Giuseppe Sarti (St. Petersburg, 1786)
- Ramiro in Il conte di Saldagna by Angelo Tarchi (Milan, 1787)
- Timante in Demofoonte by Gaetano Pugnani (Turin, 1788)
- Achille in Ifigenia in Aulide by Luigi Cherubini (Turin and Milan, 1788; London, 1789)
- Gualtieri in Il disertore by Angelo Tarchi (London, 1789; Siena, 1791; Vicenza, 1794; Genoa, 1799)
- Porus in La generosità d'Alessandro by Angelo Tarchi (London, 1789; Siena, 1791)
- Megacle in L'Olimpiade by Vincenzo Federici (Turin, 1790)
- Giulio Sabino in Giulio Sabino by Angelo Tarchi (Turin, 1790)
- Timante in L'usurpator innocente by Vincenzo Federici (London, 1790)
- Poro in La generosità d'Alessandro by Angelo Tarchi (London, 1790)
- Pirro in Andromaca by Sebastiano Nasolini (London, 1790)
- Ercole in L'apoteosi d'Ercole by Angelo Tarchi (Venice, 1791)
- Medoro in Angelica e Medoro by Ferdinando Bertoni (Venice, 1791)
- Timante in an anonymous Demofoonte (Venice, 1791)
- Poro in Alessandro nell'Indie by Angelo Tarchi (Livorno, 1791)
- Timante in an anonymous Demofoonte (Livorno, 1791)
- Pirro in Pirro, re di Epiro by Niccolò Antonio Zingarelli (Milan, 1792; Venice and Bergamo, 1793; Vicenza, 1794; Venice, 1795; Faenza, 1796; Genoa, 1797; Livorno, 1798)
- Learco in Adrasto re d'Egitto by Angelo Tarchi (Milan, 1792)
- Ezio in Ezio by Angelo Tarchi (Vicenza, 1792)
- Arbace in Artaserse by Niccolò Antonio Zingarelli (Milan, 1794)
- Timante in Demofoonte by Marcos Portugal (Milan, 1794)
- Achille in Achille in Sciro by Marcello Bernardini (Venice, 1794)
- Ramiro in Il conte di Saldagna by Niccolò Antonio Zingarelli (Venice and Reggio Emilia, 1795; Venice and Livorno, 1798)
- Arbace in Artaserse by Giuseppe Nicolini (Venice, 1795)
- Timante in Demofoonte by Niccolò Antonio Zingarelli (Venice, 1795)
- Achille in Ifigenia in Aulide by Niccolò Antonio Zingarelli (Venice, 1795)
- Lovinski in La Lodoiska by Simon Mayr (Venice, Faenza, and Senigallia, 1796; Venice and Genoa, 1797; Livorno, 1798, Genoa, 1799; Milan, 1800; Milan, 1805)
- Mexicow in Carolina e Mexicow Niccolò Antonio Zingarelli (Venice, 1798)
- Lauso in Lauso e Lidia by Simon Mayr (Venice, 1798)
- Mexicow in Carolina e Mexicow by Gaetano Rossi (Venice, 1798)
- Tito in Bruto by Giuseppe Nicolini (Genoa, 1799)
- Idante in Idante by Marcos Portugal (Milan, 1800)
- Ariodante in Ginevra di Scozia by Simon Mayr (Trieste, 1801; Milan, 1802; Reggio Emilia, 1804)
- Annibale in Annibale in Capua by Antonio Salieri (Trieste, 1801)
- Castore in Castore e Polluce by Vincenzo Federici (Milan, 1803; Milan, 1805)
- Eraldo in Eraldo ed Emma by Simon Mayr (Milan, 1805)
- Publio Corelio Scipione in Il trionfo di Emilia by Stefano Pavesi (Milan, 1805)

== External link ==
- List of Marchesi's dramatic roles from Corago
