= La passione di Gesù Cristo (Mysliveček) =

1773 oratorio by Josef Mysliveček

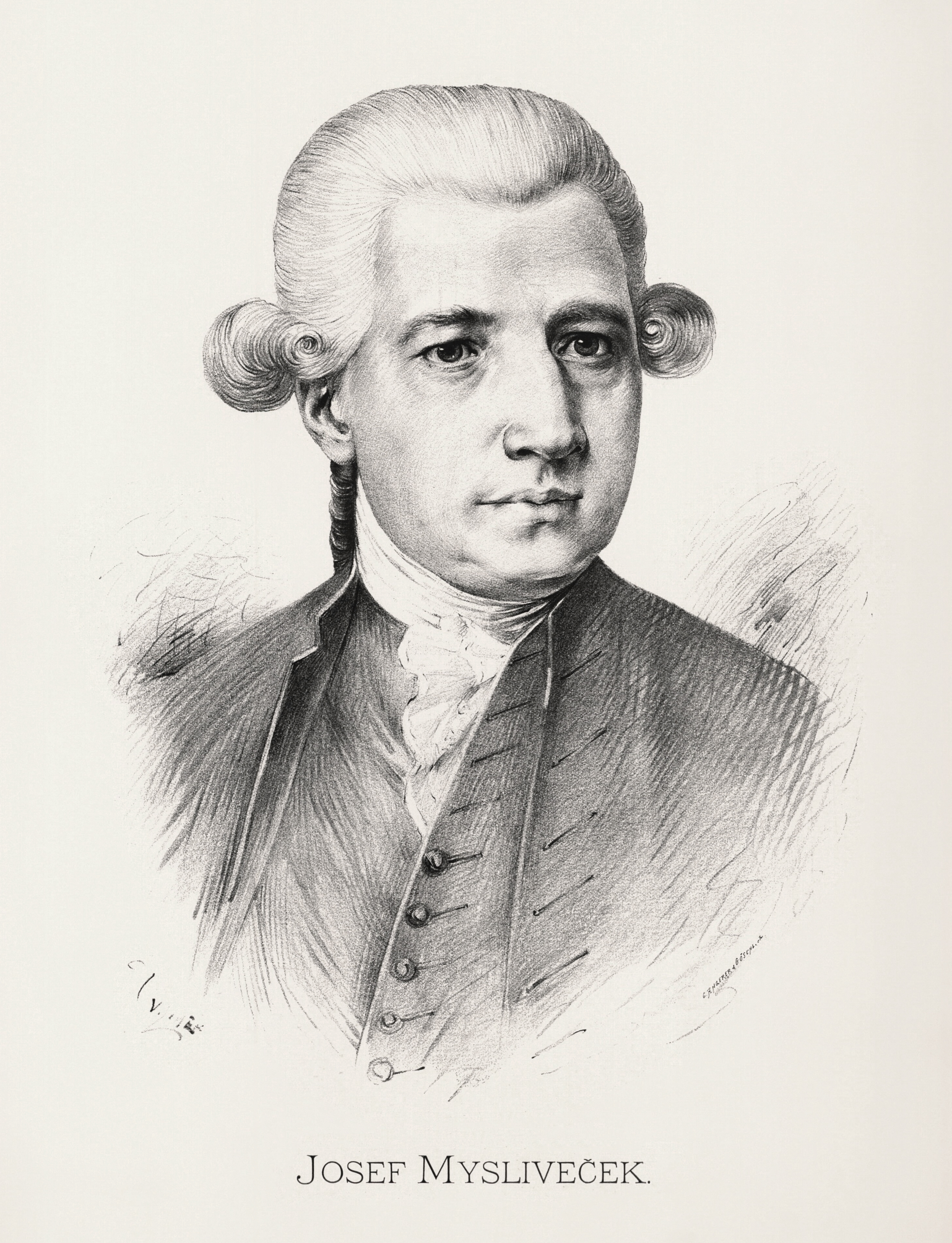
Posthumous portrait of Josef Mysliveček by Jan Vilímek based on a contemporary engraving

La passione di Gesù Cristo, originally designated La passione di Nostro Signore for its première in Florence, is an Italian oratorio by the Czech composer Josef Mysliveček. The text is an oratorio libretto by Metastasio that was frequently set in the 18th century, first performed with music by Antonio Caldara in Vienna in 1730. The setting by Mysliveček was first given in Florence in 1773. It is perhaps the finest setting of Metastasio's La passione ever produced in the 18th century and was revived with some frequency during Mysliveček's lifetime and about a decade after his death in 1781.

== Performance history ==
Josef Mysliveček visited Florence a number of times in the 1760s, beginning soon after he moved to Italy from Prague late in 1763. At first, it was a valuable location for him to cultivate his activities as a teacher and violinist. Later, he was able to mount three productions of his operas in Florence (Ipermestra in 1769, and Motezuma in 1771 and Adriano in Siria in 1776) and three oratorios that marked his greatest period as a composer in that genre (Adamo ed Eva of 1771, La passione of 1773, and Isacco, figura del redentore of 1776).

The performance of La passione in Florence during Lent of 1773 was unknown until the results of a bibliographic study by Robert Lamar Weaver and Norma Wright Weaver were published in 1993. No libretto for the production survives; it is known only from mention of it in issues of the journal Gazzetta toscana that appeared in the spring of 1773. The names of the cast members are recorded in the Gazzetta toscana, but they are not matched to roles. The Gazzetta toscana reports that La passione was performed in the Porta Rossa of Florence first on 24 March 1773, then on 6 April before “an extraordinary gathering.” Earlier, the first performance was believed to have been in Prague at the church of St. Francis Serafin, as documented in librettos printed in Prague that record its performance at the church of St. Francis Serafin in the Old City on the morning of Good Friday of 1773 (9 April). Clearly, Mysliveček carefully coordinated performances of La passione almost simultaneously for presentation in Florence and Prague during Lent of 1773. A number of revivals of Mysliveček's La passione took place before the end of the 18th century, including a reprise in Florence during Lent of 1774 that is recorded in the Gazzetta toscana, with much the same cast as in 1773. A performance in Bologna is known to have taken place in 1777 and another performance in Prague in 1782, whereas the possibility of a performance in Munich during Mysliveček's stay in that city in 1777-78 is uncertain. The most notable revivals, however, took place in the church of Santa Maria in Vallicella in Rome between 1780 and 1791. They functioned somewhat like companions for the performances of Mysliveček's oratorio Isacco that were even more popular at the Vallicella between 1779 and 1791. Mysliveček probably brought the score of La passione with him to Rome in 1780 at the time of the performances there of his last two operas, Medonte and Antigono. He never left Rome before his death in the city in 1781. Perhaps the most important revival of La passione in the 21st century was a performance given by the early music ensemble Collegium 1704 in Prague as part of the Prague Spring International Music Festival of 2013.

== Notes on the music ==
Mysliveček's La passione is typical in many ways for an Italian oratorio written in the 1770s, with many stylistic traits borrowed from contemporary Italian opera seria. As pointed out by Joyce L. Johnson, Mysliveček appears to have sought out the setting of Metastasio's La passione by Niccolò Jommelli, originally performed in 1749, as a stylistic model. The “Mozartian” character of the score overall has been noted by Joyce L. Johnson.

Very similar to the conventions of opera seria, the dramatic presentation of a typical oratorio of the 18th century consists of recitatives that set up emotional states for which singers project their feelings in highly developed arias. The stories of oratorios in Italy of the 18th century were usually based on incidents drawn from the Old Testament that were built around family relationships, as would be normal in opera seria. The sacred content of oratorio texts mandated the avoidance of the kind of amorous intrigues that were a central preoccupation of opera seria. The musical settings tended to be conservative, with archaic devices such as counterpoint much more prominently deployed than in opera seria and also the inclusion of choruses in sacred style. Difficult passagework for the singers could find outlets, but the extravagant coloratura so beloved by audiences for opera seria was not favored.

The large-scale dramatic sections of oratorios are labeled “parts” instead of the “acts” of an opera, and there would usually be two “parts”. The texts of oratorios were generally much shorter than in opera seria with the typical number of arias just twelve total (six for each part). La passione follows this tradition faithfully.

As in opera seria, the presentation of an Italian oratorio of the 1770s would involve an unfolding of a regular succession of passages that relay the story line with intense expressions of the emotions of the principal characters. The basic story line would be mainly given out with passages in the style of recitative, which resembles the sound of human speech in song, generally without the repetition of words and is mainly caste in blank verse. Broadly speaking, there are two types of recitative: the “simple” type generally referred to in the 18th century as recitativo semplice (now usually referred to by professional musicians as recitativo secco, or “dry” recitative) and the more elaborate “accompanied” recitative. Simple recitative is scored for nothing but a vocal soloist and basso continuo, which would take the form of a bass instrument, especially cello, reinforced by improvised chords executed by a keyboard player (in the 1770s, typically harpsichord or a form of the early piano now frequently referred to as fortepiano). Accompanied recitative would involve the participation of the full operatic orchestra and was considered a special effect to be used only in moments of particularly intense emotional turmoil. The unusually poignant text for La passione invites many passages to be written in the style of accompanied recitative, the outstanding section set to the text “Qual terribil vendetta” in Part 2 as part of a vicious warning to the Jews of Jerusalem from Joseph of Arimathea concerning the eventual destruction of Jerusalem as atonement for the crucifixion of Christ and the rejection of His teachings.

The emotional states of the solo singers in an oratorio, as in opera seria, are highlighted in discrete vocal numbers referred to as "arias", which are set to rhymed verse cast in two stanzas of text. The way that the two stanzas of text were divided up was the object of considerable changing customs in the 1770s. Between 1690 and the early 1760s, Italian arias usually conformed to a pattern known as ABA form (or da capo form), which involved the setting of words from the first stanza of text only in a formalized first section (the “A” section), then the setting of words from the second stanza of text only in a formalized second section (the “B” section), followed by a verbatim repeat of the music for the first section (the “A” section). The “B” section could differ quite radically from the musical style of the “A” section, often sharing neither tempo nor meter. The differences between the two sections were governed by the choice of key words or phrase that were prominent in each of the two stanzas of text (the words of which were not shared between the two sections). By the mid-1760s, the length of arias was getting to be too long, so composers preferred to bring back only a portion of the “A” section after the “B” section was heard. The place at which the abbreviated repetition of the “A” section was supposed to start was indicated by a decorative letter “S”, leading to the terminology dal segno aria.

The popularity of dal segno arias did not endure long, only until the mid-1770s. Mysliveček's opera Demetrio and oratorio La passione, both written in 1773, are the last of his dramatic works with dal segno arias in the majority (7 of the 12 arias of La passione are cast in dal segno form). Dal segno arias were mainly replaced by vocal pieces based on the standards of sonata form. In sonata form amalgamations, there would generally not be complete stops at the end of the presentations of each of the two stanzas of text. Instead, there would be a continuous presentation of music with only interim pauses between sections that corresponded to the exposition, development, and recapitulation sections of sonata form. The first stanza of text would be reserved for the sections of aria that corresponded to the exposition and recapitulation sections of sonata form, whereas the second stanza of text would be given to the equivalent of the development section.

Overall, the most beautiful and highly developed arias in La passione were written for the castrato Tommaso Guarducci, who probably sang the role of Joseph of Arimathea: “Torbido mar che freme” and “All’idea de’ tuoi perigli.” Both were carefully designed to highlight the kind of simple and direct vocal expression that was considered to be a specialty of his. In general, Mysliveček's operas and oratorios written for Florence exhibit more adventuresome use of wind instruments than works he wrote for other cities, but the orchestration for La passion is quite restrained, probably an indication that the instrumental ensemble used for the first production did not employ the most highly skilled players available in Florence at the time. Most of the arias are scored simply for oboes and French horns, the most common instrumentation for the arias in operas and oratorios throughout Italy in the 1770s, or else for voice and strings alone. Two of the arias for Saint Peter, “Tu nel duol felice” and “Se la pupilla inferna,” are scored for flutes and strings, and Mary Magdalene's aria “A i passi erranti” features an obbligato part for solo flute along with strings. The sound of flutes was usually introduced at this time to create a mood of tenderness.

A typical opera seria from the 1770s would include a vocal duet at the end of one of the acts. This custom is preserved in La passione, but the duet for Pietro and Maddalena is not at all a vehicle for the expression of carnal love in the way that would be normal in opera seria. Instead, the duet brings to life the intensity of emotions shared between the two characters. One is guilt for past transgressions, in each case implied, never explicitly stated. For Pietro, the guilt would derive from his denial of Jesus. The mention of “faults” whose “weight” bears down so heavily on Maddalena is likely meant to refer to the putative activities of Mary Magdalene as a prostitute (unsupported in Biblical references, but long sanctioned in Catholic legend). The other emotion they share is their outrage over Christ's crucifixion. The structure of love duets in opere serie of the 1770s was based on an alternation of sections in which the characters express their emotions separately followed by sections in which their emotional synchronization is signaled by singing in parallel thirds or sixths. The passagework in parallel motion approaching the end of a duet is supposed to be very close and intricate as a dazzling virtuosic excursion, and this custom does find an outlet in the duet from Mysliveček's La passione.

In opera seria of the 18th century, the only place where choral singing is generally obligatory is at the very end, where there is supposed to be a vocal piece sung by all surviving characters that celebrates the joy of a happy resolution to all outstanding dramatic conflicts and the vindication of an overriding moral principle. Technically, it is actually a vocal ensemble rather than a chorus sung by a full choir. Choruses for full choirs can appear in opere serie, but they are generally absent. In oratorios, with their connection to the musical style of sacred worship, pieces for full choirs are much more common. They usually function to comment on the main dramatic conflicts. There are three choruses in Mysliveček's La passione: a chorus of Christ's mournful followers near the beginning and a generalized chorus at the end of each part. The earlier chorus is rather simple, set in a declamatory style with a few touches of counterpoint. The choruses at the end of the two parts are quite different, both set mainly in archaic alla breve meter (with two whole notes per measure) and enriched by very sophisticated counterpoint, yet still powerful and appealing. They serve as a reminder that Mysliveček's early training in Prague was originally among local choir masters. He clearly never forgot the importance of his youthful exposure to sacred music.

A special feature of the high quality of the music to be found in Mysliveček's La passione is its orchestral Introduzione, one of the finest pieces of instrumental music ever written by Mysliveček, and one of those that most closely approaches the sound of Mozart's music. Usually, Mysliveček's overtures for operas and oratorios would be cast as sinfonie, in Italy of the 1770s usually meaning orchestral pieces in three movements of the pattern fast-slow-fast. This tradition of sinfonie as overtures to operas and oratorios extends back to the early 18th century and was adopted for the early Italian symphonies that started to emerge in the 1730s. To a large extent, symphonies and operatic overtures were stylistically equivalent in Italy of the 1770s. But the Introduzione of La passione is in a single movement in sonata form, a forerunner of the type of the single-movement dramatic overtures that started to become more common in the 1770s under the influence of Giovanni Paisiello, then became normal all over Europe in the 1780s. The Introduzione to La passione was not originally conceived for the production in 1773, however, rather it was borrowed from Mysliveček's first oratorio, Tobia (Padua, 1769). Its first appearance in a work written in 1769 is all the more remarkable for its mature treatment of sonata form and its emotional depth. It is one of a very small number of instrumental works by Mysliveček in minor key and can be compared for its passionate style of expression to his Symphony in G minor, Op. 1, no. 5, a work written just before Mysliveček's move to Italy at the end of 1763.

== Roles ==
Roles	Voice type	Première cast, 24 March and 6 April 1773, Porta Rossa, Florence
Giuseppe	tenor	Tommaso Guarducci (?)
Pietro	soprano castrato	Giacomo Veroli (?)
Maddalena	soprano	Elisabetta Melani
Giovanni	alto castrato	Vincenzio Niccolini

== Synopsis ==
Music lovers acquainted with the passions of Johann Sebastian Bach expect any Passion from the 18th century to include depictions of the last sufferings of Jesus Christ before His Crucifixion. But, as Daniel E. Freeman has pointed out, the traditions of oratorios of the 17th and 18th centuries in Italy never developed strong techniques of portraying Christ in dramatic works. Instead, the traditions mainly concentrated on stories drawn from the Old Testament that featured family relationships similar to those found in Italian operas. Thus Metastasio's libretto La passione does not include Christ as a character at all, nor does it include any explicit depiction of His sufferings. Instead, it explores the feelings of a group of people in Christ's circle (a quasi-family unit) who find outlets for their emotions shortly after witnessing His crucifixion. Only four characters, all well known from accounts in the New Testament, are represented: Saint Peter (Pietro), Mary Magdalene (Maddalena), John the Apostle (Giovanni), and Joseph of Arimathea (Giuseppe).

One characteristic of Metastasio's La passione that definitely is shared with German Passions of the 18th century is anti-semitic sentiments. At one point, in Part 1, after learning of Christ's agony on the way to His crucifixion (the Via Dolorosa), the character Pietro (=Saint Peter) remarks, “Come inventar potea pena maggior la crudeltade ebrea?” (“How could one even invent greater Jewish cruelty?”). Joseph of Arimathea assures him that the Jews did indeed come up with it. In Part 2, it is learned that Jesus’ followers may not visit His tomb after the crucifixion since the site is being guarded by the Jews, who fear that the disciples will steal the body, Giovanni (=John the Apostle) condemns the Jews for doing this and Giuseppe (=Joseph of Arimathea) becomes enraged with them, invoking a prophecy concerning a future destruction of Jerusalem. In describing it, Metastasio alluded to historical accounts of certain grisly incidents associated with the Siege and destruction of Jerusalem by the Romans in 70 AD, including cannibalism. The blame for this catastrophe is placed on the Jews who refuse to become followers of Christ.

Metastasio's scenario for La passione grows out of an incident known as the Denial of Peter, in which Saint Peter denied knowing Christ three times after His arrest during the evening of Maundy Thursday. Christ predicted that this would happen by early the next morning in the face of Peter's declaration at the end of the Last Supper that he could never deny or disown Him. While following Jesus into custody, Peter did indeed deny knowing Jesus or being one of his disciples three times before the “cock crowed” on Good Friday. As a result, Peter withdrew and did not himself observe the events that immediately preceded the crucifixion of Jesus. In the Metastasio libretto, after the crucifixion and Burial of Jesus (but before His Resurrection), Peter had the details recounted to him by Mary Magdalene, the Apostle John, and Joseph of Arimathea, at the end of the day of Christ's crucifixion, Good Friday, just before sundown.

=== Part 1 ===
Pietro returns to his friends in a state of confusion, mindful of his betrayal of Jesus and fearful that He might not still be alive. A chorus of Jesus’ followers laments His sufferings and reproaches Pietro for his indifference to them. Pietro asks Maddalena, Giovanni, and Giuseppe if He might still be alive in spite of these tribulations. By seeing the tears, pallor, and grief of Maddalena, the answer is clear to him, and she expresses her intense emotional pain in an aria.

When Maddalena finishes, Giovanni points out how fortunate he was not to have had to witness Jesus being brought before a judge, scourged, mocked, and forced to wear a crown of thorns. Then, Giuseppe describes how Jesus was sent to Calvary to die, having to carry His own cross to the place of execution, and how he stumbled, with Giuseppe little able to assist Him, until he arrived. Pietro asks what was going on with His mother. Maddalena describes how His mother was able to approach the cross after it had been raised, embrace the cross, and endure the horror of seeing her tears being mixed with Jesus’ blood. Giuseppe tells how, with her son dying in front of her, Mary was forcibly torn away from Him, but they were still able to speak to each other. Giovanni explains what they said. They expressed devotion to one another and concern for those in Jesus’ circle who were watching what has happening to them amid the jeers of a hostile crowd.

After Pietro sings an aria devoted to his grief over these events, Giovanni asks him to imagine the pain he must have felt to see the offer of vinegar made to the thirsting Jesus and his final communication on the cross with His Father while looking out at the soldiers present, in which he commends His soul into the hands of the Father. Pietro and Maddalena reproach themselves for past sins. If it were not for sins such as theirs, they declare, it would never have been necessary for Christ to die in this terrible way. The chorus at the end of Part 1 expresses assurance that the Redeemer's sacrifice will bring salvation to the righteous, but death to the wicked. The sacrifice was intended as a gift to humanity and should inspire gratitude and virtue.

=== Part 2 ===
At the start of Part 2, Pietro requests further information about what has happened after the crucifixion. Giuseppe tells him that he had Jesus properly buried and sealed the tomb with a marble stone. Because of the Sabbath (which is just falling at sunset on Good Friday) and the guards placed around the tomb by Pontius Pilate, it is not yet possible to visit it. When Giuseppe recalls the prophecy of the forthcoming destruction of Jerusalem and the temple, Pietro sees it as atonement for the fact that Jesus was not recognized as the Son of God and enumerates his various miracles. Still, a mood of hope overtakes those present for this gathering alongside further expressions, especially from Maddalena, of the depth of the tragedy that has just transpired. Maddalena suggests now that every unbelieving heart will come to faith, and Giovanni reports on the signs during Jesus’ death that reveal the meaning of ancient prophecies. Pietro reassures them by saying that His parables and the memory of His death will endure and can serve as a model for all. He is confident that Jesus will return. Maddalena and Giovanni also await the resurrection, confident that the tomb will become a place of pilgrimage. The chorus at the end of Part 2 is a call for hope, love, and faith, and an exhortation to drive away fear by means of trust in the help of heaven.

== Vocal set pieces ==
Part I

- Aria of Pietro, “Giacchè mi tremi in seno”
- Chorus, “Quanto costa il tuo diletto”
- Aria of Maddalena, “Vorrei dirti il mio dolore"
- Aria of Giuseppe, “Torbido mar, che freme”
- Aria of Giovanni, “Come a vista di pene sì fiere”
- Aria of Maddalena, “Potea quel pianto”
- Aria of Pietro, “Tu nel duol felice sei”
- Duet of Pietro and Maddalena, “Vi sento, oh Dio! Vi sento”

Part 2

- Aria of Giovanni, “Ritornerà fra voi”
- Aria of Giuseppe, “All’idea de tuoi perigli”
- Aria of Pietro, “Se la pupilla inferma”
- Aria of Giovanni, “Dovunque il guardo giro”
- Aria of Maddalena, “A i passi erranti”
- Aria of Pietro, “Se a librarsi in mezzo all’onde”
- Chorus, “Santa speme, tu sei”

== Facsimile edition ==
- Johnson, Joyce L., ed. Josef Mysliveček: La Passione. The Italian Oratorio, 1650-1800, vol. 23. New York & London 1986. ISBN 0-8240-7722-9 [a reproduction of a manuscript in the Frankfurt University Library with the date of first performance erroneously indicated as 1777 in Bologna]

== Recordings ==
- (as La passione di Nostro Signore Gesù Cristo) Das Neue Orchester, Christoph Spering, conductor, Capriccio, 2005, La passione recording YouTube

== Bibliography ==
- Freeman, Daniel E. Josef Mysliveček. Minneapolis 2022. ISBN 978-1-959770-16-9
