= Castore e Polluce =

Opera seria by Francesco Bianchi

- Opera seria by Francesco Bianchi
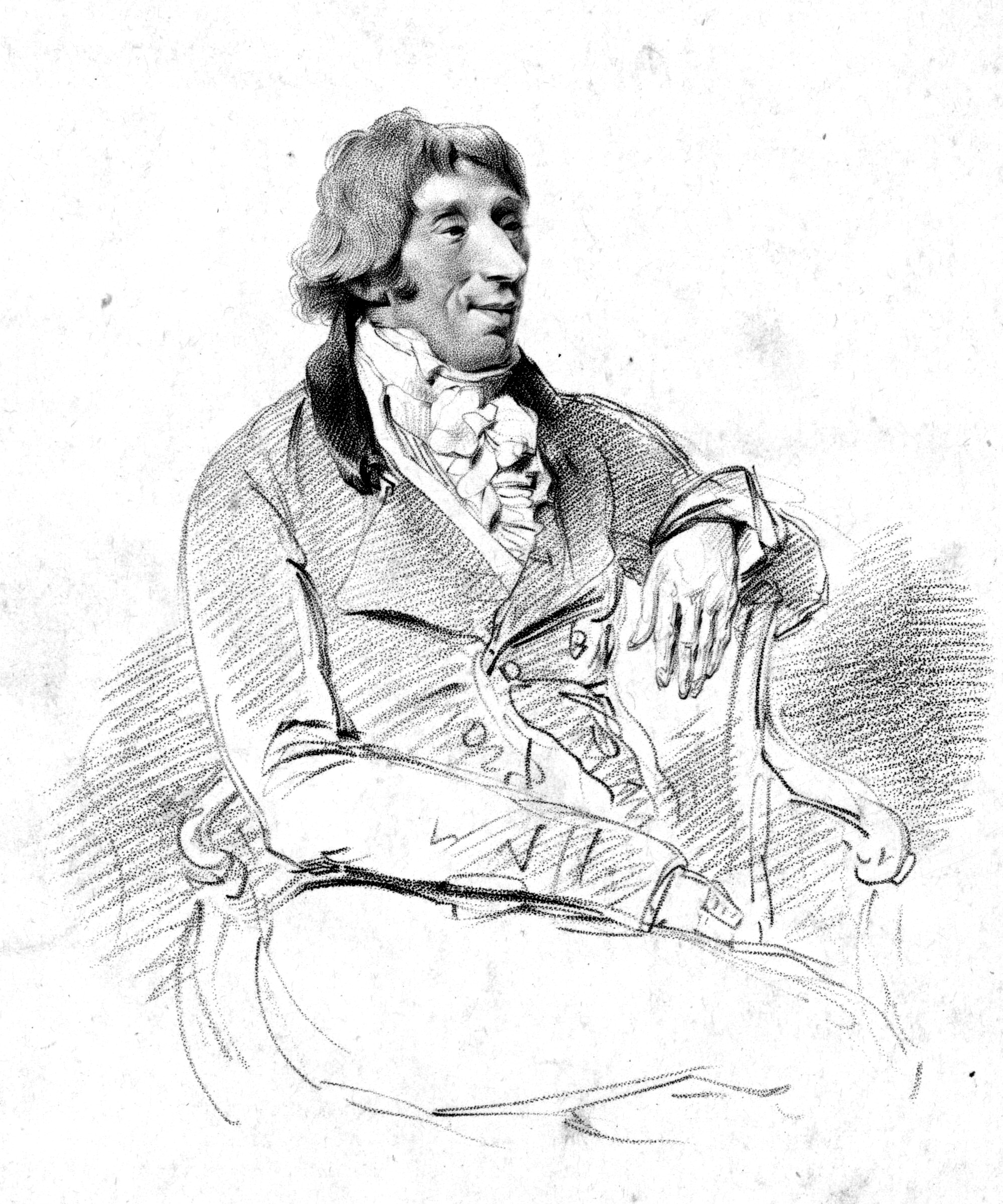
- The composer in 1805
- Librettist: Carlo Innocenzo Frugoni
- Language: Italian
- Based on: Pierre-Joseph Bernard's libretto for Castor et Pollux
- Premiere: 10 September 1779; Teatro della Pergola, Florence

Castore e Polluce (Castor and Pollux) is an opera seria by Francesco Bianchi. The libretto was adapted by Carlo Innocenzo Frugoni from Pierre-Joseph Bernard's French text for Rameau's Castor et Pollux.

The opera is a "Franco-Italian" fusion typical of "reform" operas in Italy at the time. The mythological subject matter, Castor and Pollux, and avoidance of vocal coloratura are notable signs of this. In addition to these French traits, as Marita P. McClymonds has explained, "Castore contains all the elements that had been purged from Italian serious opera before the turn of the century: gods appearing in machines, miraculous scene changes, arias without exit, much use of chorus, and an infernal scene in the underworld with dancing."

== Performance history ==
The first performance of the opera was given at the Teatro della Pergola in Florence in a run that began on 10 September 1779. Gherardo Casaglia gives 8 September 1779 as the date of the first performance with conflicting descriptions as a second version revival in three acts, and a premiere in four acts. It was revived for a performance in Padua in June 1780 (during the opera season known as the Fiera in honor of St. Anthony of Padua) at the Nuovo Teatro.

== Castore e Polluce and Mozart's arrangement "Ridente la calma" ==
Surprisingly, the appearance of the renowned castrato Luigi Marchesi in Bianchi's opera Castore e Polluce set into motion a series of events that led to the composition of Mozart's "Ridente la calma", K. Anh.A 36 (formerly K. 152 and 210a), an arrangement (or transcription) for voice and piano that was based for the most part on music by Josef Mysliveček but incorporated a few musical ideas from one of Bianchi's later operatic works. The origins of Mozart's arrangement "Ridente la calma" can be traced to the aria "Se piangi, se peni" from the final act of Bianchi's Castore e Polluce, a vocal piece whose style matches the character of the "reform" opera in which it appears for its modest length and simple, "natural" melodic lines devoid of elaborate coloratura. Marchesi was so pleased with Bianchi's "Se piangi, se peni" that he had it inserted into the next opera performed during the autumn season in Florence of 1779, Giuseppe Sarti's Achille in Sciro. Marchesi then brought "Se piangi, se peni" with him to the Teatro alla Scala in Milan at the end of the year 1779, where he clearly intended to insert it in the final act of Mysliveček's opera Armida for the carnival operatic season of 1780.

The insertion of the aria would have been a problem for Mysliveček, however, who was averse to permitting arias by other composers to be used in the first performances of his operas (not a single case of which has ever been identified in any of the scores prepared for his operatic premières). Instead of incorporating a Bianchi aria into his score, Mysliveček supplied Marchesi with a new short aria in simple style for the beginning of the final act of Armida: "Il caro mio bene". As can be seen by comparing the arias "Se piangi, se peni" by Bianchi and "Il caro mio bene" by Mysliveček, the latter was clearly based closely on the former. Each is in the same key and same old-fashioned dal-segno format and share similar length, similar tempo, similar triple meter, the same instrumentation with flutes, and very similar melodic profiles. The audiences did not care for the result that Mysliveček produced, thus "Se piangi, se peni" made it into performances of Armida after all, as many of Mysliveček arias for the roles sung by Marchesi and Caterina Gabrielli were substituted after the composer departed for Rome to supervise the première of his next opera, Medonte. "Se piangi, se peni" was one of them. Marchesi achieved notable success in Milan with Bianchi's "Se piangi, se peni".

The next important aria to be singled out in the story of the origins of Mozart's "Ridente la calma" is Francesco Bianchi's aria "Ridente la calma" as it appeared in the final act of his opera Il trionfo della pace for Turin in 1782. This aria, in similar musical style to both Bianchi's "Se piangi, se peni" and Mysliveček's "Il caro mio bene", was set to the same text as Mozart's arrangement "Ridente la calma". Mozart's setting of "Ridente la calma" differs little from the music found in Mysliveček's "Il caro mio bene", but the middle of Bianchi's version seems to have been the source of some musical features of the middle section of Mozart's arrangement "Ridente la calma". Marchesi likely brought the music for the arias of Mysliveček and Bianchi (perhaps including the prototype aria "Se piangi, se peni") to Mozart's attention when both men were present in Vienna in 1785 during the preparations and performance of Giuseppe Sarti's opera Giulio Sabino, in which Marchesi appeared. For unknown reasons, Mozart chose to draw inspiration mainly from Mysliveček's music but used the text from a Bianchi aria along with some of its musical motives. The latest edition of the Köchel catalogue specifies the date of composition of Mozart's arrangement "Il caro mio bene" as "presumably around 1785" in Vienna.

== Roles ==
Roles, voice types, premiere cast
Role	Voice type	Premiere cast, 10 September 1779
Polluce (Pollux)	soprano castrato	Francesco Agresta
Castore (Castor)	soprano castrato	Luigi Marchesi
Telaira (Hilaeira)	soprano	Cecilia Davies
Febe (Phoebe) and Ebe (Hebe)	soprano	Nancy Storace
Giove (Zeus)	tenor	Giacinto Perroni
Cleonte	tenor	Francesco Casini Papi

== Synopsis ==
The immortal Polluce wishes to change places with his mortal (and dead) brother, Castore, so that the latter can rejoin his lover Telaira. This causes many complications, not least with Telaira's sister (and Polluce's lover) Febe. Giove ultimately reunites Polluce, Castore and Telaira in heaven.
