= Isacco, figura del redentore =

1776 oratorio by Josef Mysliveček

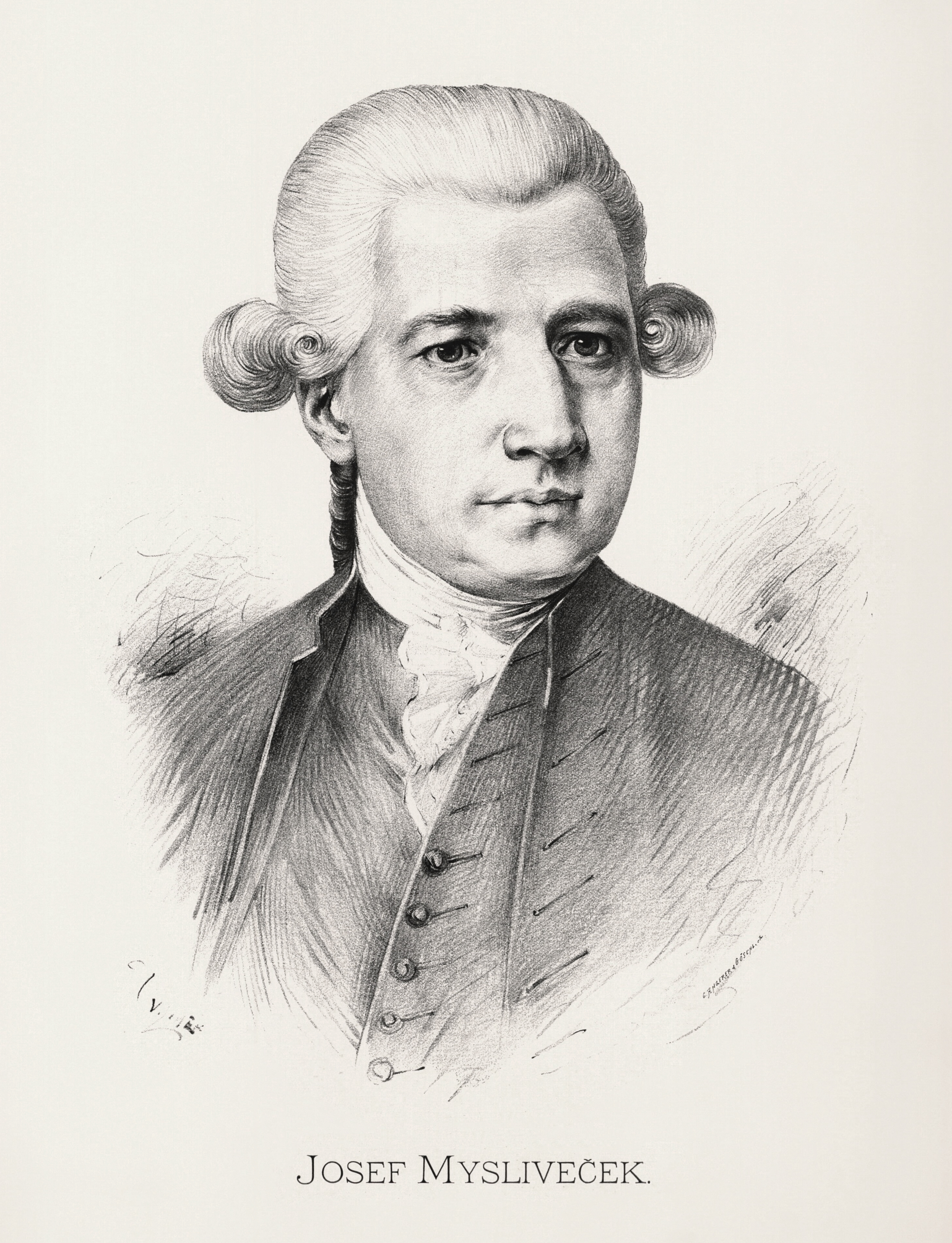
Posthumous portrait of Josef Mysliveček by Jan Vilímek based on a contemporary engraving

Isacco, figura del redentore (Isaac, a Forerunner of the Redeemer) is an Italian oratorio by the Czech composer Josef Mysliveček sometimes referred to as Abramo ed Isacco. The text is one of the most favored oratorio librettos produced by Metastasio, originally set by Luca Antonio Predieri for performance in Vienna in 1740. The setting by Mysliveček was first performed in Florence in 1776, the last (and greatest) of his eight oratorios. It is perhaps the finest setting of Metastasio's Isacco ever produced in the 18th century and often singled out as the composer's greatest work. Widely performed during Mysliveček's lifetime and about a decade after his death in 1781, its excellence was considered so striking that it was passed off at times as a work of both of Joseph Haydn and Wolfgang Amadeus Mozart. In fact, the musicologist Felice Boghen, who came across the manuscript attributed to Mozart in Florence sometime in the early 20th century, hailed it in print as a newly discovered Mozart masterpiece. In the latest edition of the Köchel catalogue, Mysliveček's Isacco bears the number K. Anh. C 4.03. The work has been revived with conspicuous success in the late 20th and early 21st centuries.

== Performance history ==
The city of Florence became a frequent stopping place for Josef Mysliveček in the 1760s shortly after his move from Prague to Italy late in 1763. At first, it was a valuable location for him to cultivate his activities as a teacher and violinist. Later, he was able to savor notable productions of his operas in Florence (the first two L'Ipermestra in 1769 and Motezuma in 1771, followed by Adriano in Siria in the same year that Isacco was first performed), and the first two of a series of three oratorios that marked his greatest period as a composer in that genre (the other two were Adamo ed Eva of 1771 and La passione di Nostro Signore Gesù Cristo of 1773). No later than 1771, he became closely associated with Earl Cowper, an English nobleman who was a great patron of the arts in Florence.

Beginning at an unknown time near the end of 1775, Mysliveček found himself stranded in Florence. The Elector of Bavaria, Maximilian III Joseph, intended to engage Mysliveček to compose an opera for the carnival season of 1776 in Munich, but the composer was unable to make the journey due to the effects of a chronic illness believed to be syphilis. He remained in Florence for an extra year and sought opportunities to publicize his abilities as a composer. He was able to see productions of his oratorio Isacco during Lent of 1776 (with the assistance of Lord Cowper) and the opera Adriano in Siria in the autumn at the Teatro del Cocomero. Each was a notable success. He also came into contact with the Florentine music publisher Ranieri del Vivo, who published a number of his orchestral works, including a collection of his symphonies that constituted the first anthology of symphonies ever published in Italy.

It was Lord Cowper's musical establishment that sponsored the first performance of Isacco in the Casino dei Nobili on 10 March 1776, with another performance given on 13 March at a gathering of the Accademia degl' Armonici, a group of music lovers headed by Lord Cowper. The all-male cast of the original productions of Isacco doubtless reflects an attitude in Italy that sacred works should be performed only by men (a proposition for oratorios made much easier in the 18th century by the wide availability of castrated male sopranos). Unlike in liturgical musical performances, a non-liturgical sacred work could include female performers in Italy of the 1770s, but this was not done in the case of the first performance of Mysliveček's Isacco.

The long series of revivals of Isacco began already in the year 1777 after Mysliveček had recovered well enough from his illness to travel to Munich and fulfill the opera commission extended to him earlier from the Elector of Bavaria. In the carnival season of 1777, there was a performance of a new setting of Mysliveček's Ezio followed by a fresh production (with minor alterations) of his Isacco during Lent.

Whereas the reception of Ezio in Munich was mixed, Isacco was an overwhelming success, due in particular to the singing of Luigi Marchesi, at that time an obscure young Italian castrato whose appearances in Ezio and Isacco in Munich were the most significant roles of his career up to that time. Marchesi was able to take advantage of his new acquaintance with Mysliveček to secure casting at the Teatro San Carlo in Naples, the most prestigious opera theater in Europe, for the 1778/1779 operatic season, which featured performances of Mysliveček's operas La Calliroe and L'Olimpiade that helped to establish him permanently as one of the greatest operatic stars of the era (in particular the latter).

Many revivals of Mysliveček's Isacco took place in the late 18th century. As of now, nearly twenty of them can be documented up to 1791. Nine of these performances took place at the church of Santa Maria in Vallicella in Rome, where it was a reliable favorite between 1779 and 1791. Mysliveček's residence in Rome during the last year of his life and the Roman premières of his last two operas (Medonte and Antigono) may have helped create interest for it. One subsequent revival in Florence in recorded (in 1777) and two subsequent revivals in Munich are recorded (in 1778 and 1787). In addition, there were performances in Milan (probably in 1777), Buda (in 1785), Bratislava (in 1786), Koblenz (in 1787), and Pest (in 1787). Mysliveček's admirers in Prague made certain that Mysliveček's oratorios were heard regularly in the church of St. Francis Serafin in the Old City between 1770 and 1782. Isacco was given there in 1778. Interest in Isacco began to be revived in the late 20th century, with the release of a complete recording by the Czech label Supraphon in 1972 a landmark event. A notable recent revival took place in 2022 at the Mozarteum in Salzburg as part of the Salzburg Festival, performed by the Czech early music ensemble Collegium 1704.

== Connection with Mozart ==
The alternative title Abramo ed Isacco for Mysliveček's Isacco has been perpetuated mainly from a precedent in the Mozart correspondence. An extraordinary letter of Wolfgang Mozart written to his father from Munich on 11 October 1777 describes a visit to Mysliveček's sickbed in a hospital where he was recovering from a failed operation that resulted in his nose being burned off.The concern Mozart revealed to his father at this time for Mysliveček's sufferings was very touching indeed. In the entire Mozart correspondence, no individual outside the Mozart family was ever the cause for as much outpouring of emotion as what is found in Wolfgang's description of his visit to Mysliveček at this time. As a part of explaining to his father the professional assistance that Mysliveček was trying to supply him and the high esteem with which he was held in Munich, Wolfgang noted that in reference to the oratorio he knew as Abramo ed Isacco, "all Munich is talking about [it]". This remark earlier created confusion in the musicological literature about when Isacco was first performed in Munich, since it hinted at a première in the autumn of 1777 while Mozart was visiting the city. It is now known that the oratorio was first performed in February 1777, during Lent, which means that in the autumn of 1777, Munich was still talking about it, unless there were subsequent performances in Munich in 1777 whose details remain obscure.

The German musicologist Christoph-Hellmut Mahling was the first to notice an uncanny similarity between the opening of an accompanied recitative in Mysliveček's Isacco ("Eterno Dio" from Part 1) and the opening of the scene "Zu Hülfe, zu Hülfe" from act 1 of Mozart's opera The Magic Flute of 1791. In addition, the music for the march written for Part 2 of the Munich version of Isacco is strongly reminiscent of the ceremonial music associated with the high priest Sarastro in Act I of The Magic Flute. It is unknown whether or not Mozart actually came into contact with music from Isacco during his trip to Munich in autumn of 1777, and it is doubtful that he could have continued to remember passages from it early 14 years after visiting with Mysliveček in Munich. Nonetheless, the oratorio was performed in many parts of Europe later in the 1770s and 1780s. As far as contacts with Mozart are concerned, it is known that Emanuel Schikaneder, the librettist and producer of The Magic Flute with a long-standing relationship with the Mozart family, lived in Munich in the late 1770s and produced Isacco in Buda in 1785 as part of his activities as an impresario, thus it is possible that Schikaneder could have brought Isacco to Mozart's attention closer to the time of the composition of The Magic Flute.

== Notes on the music ==
Mysliveček's Isacco is typical in many ways for an Italian oratorio written in the 1770s, with many stylistic traits borrowed from contemporary Italian opera seria. The serious subject and a musical presentation in which the dramatic action is relayed with recitatives that set up emotional states that singers project in highly developed arias are also the basis of opera seria of the era. As a much more prestigious music genre than oratorio, composers sought inspiration from the artistic standards of opera seria and responded to musical trends pioneered in opera seria. As sacred dramas, oratorios in Italy of the 18th century were usually based on stories drawn from the Old Testament that were built around family relationships, as would be normal in opera seria. Unlike traditions in Germany, Christ-centered stories were avoided. No strong traditions for the depiction of Christ were ever developed in Italian oratorios of the 17th and 18th centuries. Consistent with their sacred orientation, oratorios avoid the explorations of amorous intrigues of the sort that were a central preoccupation of opera seria. Consistent with the aura of religious worship associated with oratorios, modesty and restraint were an important aspect of oratorios, which were performed without staging. One of the most important signs of this was the frequent suppression of the names of the performers in oratorios in the librettos printed for performances, as if the vanity typical of operatic stars was something that needed to be mitigated. The musical settings tended to be conservative, with archaic devices such as counterpoint much more prominently deployed than in opera seria and the inclusion of choruses in sacred style. Difficult passagework for the singers could find outlets, but the extravagant coloratura so beloved by audiences in opera seria was not favored.

Since oratorios are non-staged with no sets, costumes, or acting, their large-scale dramatic sections are not labeled acts, rather "parts". Whereas most opere serie of the 18th century were cast in three acts, most oratorios were cast in two parts. There were no indications of scenes in oratorios, unlike in opere serie, which recognized the beginning of a new "scene" whenever at least one character either entered or exited the stage.

As in opera seria, the presentation of an Italian oratorio of the 1770s would involve an unfolding of a regular succession of passages that relay the story line with intense expressions of the emotions of the principal characters. The basic story line would be mainly given out with passages in the style of recitative, which resembles the sound of human speech in song, generally without the repetition of words. Many modern listeners do not realize that the words set to music in 18th-century operas and oratorios are actually poems, not prose texts. The poetry for sections in recitative generally conform to standards of blank verse. Broadly speaking, there are two types of recitative: the "simple" type generally referred to in the 18th century as recitativo semplice (now usually referred to by professional musicians as recitativo secco, or "dry" recitative) and the more elaborate "accompanied" recitative. Simple recitative is scored for nothing but a vocal soloist and basso continuo, which would take the form of a bass instrument, especially cello, reinforced by improvised chords executed by a keyboard player (in the 1770s, typically harpsichord or a form of the early piano now frequently referred to as fortepiano). Accompanied recitative would involve the participation of the full operatic orchestra and was considered a special effect to be used only in moments of particularly intense emotional turmoil. The use of accompanied recitative in Isacco is unusually lavish for its time, an indication of the great care that Mysliveček took to set the texts available to him carefully and with the maximum effect possible. Audiences much appreciate the participation of the orchestra in recitative passages for the fuller tonal color, since it reminds them more of the beloved standards of 19th-century opera, which saw "simple" recitative die off in favor of recitative that featured orchestral accompaniment. The outstanding section in the style of accompanied recitative in Isacco is "Eterno Dio" for Abramo in Part 1, composed to express Abramo's shock at an angel telling him that God expects him to kill his son Isaac as a sacrifice.

The emotional states of the solo singers in an oratorio, as in opera seria, are highlighted in discrete vocal numbers referred to as arias, which are set to rhymed verse cast as two stanzas of text. The way that the two stanzas of text were divided up was the object of considerable changing customs in the 1770s. Between 1690 and the early 1760s, Italian arias usually conformed to a pattern known as ABA form (or da capo form), which involved the setting of words from the first stanza of text only in a formalized first section (the "A" section), then the setting of words from the second stanza of text only in a formalized second section (the "B" section), followed by a verbatim repeat of the music for the first section (the "A" section). The "B" section could differ quite radically from the musical style of the "A" section, often sharing neither tempo nor meter. The differences between the two sections were governed by the choice of key words or phrase that were prominent in each of the two stanzas of text (the words of which were not shared between the two sections). By the mid-1760s, the length of arias was getting to be too long, so composers preferred to bring back only a portion of the "A" after the "B" section was heard. The place at which the abbreviated repetition of the "A" section was supposed to start was indicated by a sign in the form of a decorative letter "S", leading to the terminology dal segno aria.

The popularity of dal segno arias did not endure long, only until the mid-1770s. Mysliveček himself largely gave them up after 1773, mainly to see them replaced by vocal pieces based on the standards of sonata form. In sonata form amalgamations, there would generally not be complete stops at the end of the presentations of each of the two stanzas of text. Instead, there would be a continuous presentation of music with only interim pauses between sections that corresponded to the exposition, development, and recapitulation sections of sonata form. The first stanza of text would be reserved for the sections of aria that corresponded to the exposition and recapitulation sections of sonata form, whereas the second stanza of text would be given to the equivalent of the development section. Sonata form amalgamations were dominant in Italian operas and oratorios by the 1770s, and there is only one aria in Isacco that conforms to the more archaic dal segno format: "Sperai le sue ritorte" from Part 2, which includes a B section with a completely different key signature, tempo, and meter in contrast to those of the A section. In addition, the aria "Madre! Amico! Ah, non piangete" in Part 1, yields a less common amalgamation with sonata form in which there are outer sections that are clearly based on the conception of the exposition and recapitulation of sonata form with a separate middle section in imitation of the old B section of da capo form that is self-contained and cast in a different tempo and meter from the outer sections. None of the arias in Isacco indulge a new preference for the spectacular slow-fast arias that were becoming popular in operas of the time. The slow-fast formats were never dominant in numbers, but their occasional use in operas were often guaranteed to make a lasting impression on audience members. As vehicles for the vanity of singers, the slow-fast arias were not as appropriate for the more restrained emotional expressions usually encountered in the genre of oratorio.

Overall, the most beautiful and highly developed arias in Isacco were written for the castrato Tommaso Guarducci in the title role: "Ah, se macchiar quest'anima", "Madre! Amico! Ah, non piangete", and "Sperai le sue ritorte". All three were carefully tailored to showcase the elegantly simple vocal style for which Guarducci was famed. Special features of this group of arias include the delicate motivic material for the upper strings in "Ah, se macchiar quest'anima", and the sordini string effects in "Sperai le sue ritorte". The basic instrumentation of opera and oratorio arias throughout Italy in the 1770s was strings plus oboe and French horns, but Mysliveček went out of his way to feature other wind instruments in some of the arias written for Isacco, including a pair of bassoons in "Entra l'uomo" from Part 2 for Abramo, sung by Valentin Adamberger, best known to music scholars for originating the role of Belmonte in Mozart's opera Die Entführung aus dem Serail. Flutes are featured in Isacco's aria "Madre! Amico! Ah, non piangete" from Part 1 and Sara's aria "Sian are i nostri in petti" in Part 2. In general, Mysliveček's operas and oratorios written for Florence exhibit more adventuresome use of wind instruments than works written for other cities.

A typical opera seria from the 1770s would include a love duet at the end of either Act I or Act II, but in oratorios, such duets were usually not included. As a substitute for this custom, Mysliveček added a special "terzetto" (vocal trio) at the end of Part 1 of Isacco that is not set to a Metastasian text. One aspect of the conservatism of oratorios in the 18th century and the tendency to downplay the vanity of performers was to preserve the integrity of Metastasio's texts to a much greater degree than in opere serie. It would not be unusual for the majority of the aria texts in productions of one of Metastasio's opera librettos to be replaced with settings of newer poetry by the 1770s. But in Mysliveček's Isacco, there are no substitutions at all, and only one insertion: the terzetto "Lascia che un bacio", with words written by an unknown poet. The result was a vocal ensemble of exceptional beauty and ingenuity.

The three characters who participate in the terzetto are Abramo, Isacco, and Sara, the latter the wife of Abramo and mother of Isacco. The conflicting loyalties of Sara form the basis of the vocal piece. Her voice is the only one that is heard almost continuously throughout, sometimes alone, sometimes in combination with her husband and son. In order to depict the emotional conflicts surrounding Abramo's relationship at the moment with his son (whose death at Abramo's hands has been ordered by God), the two never sing in pairs. Instead, Sara acts as a sort of musical intermediary by singing in tandem with her husband and son in turn to demonstrate her sympathy with both. There are times when all three characters share similar sentiments and sing together. The setting includes the insertion of an unexpected section in recitative style that has the effect of helping to create a new emotional and momentum when the music for the terzetto resumes.

In opera seria of the 18th century, the only place where choral singing is generally obligatory is at the very end, where there is supposed to be a vocal piece sung by all surviving characters that celebrates the joy of a happy resolution to all outstanding dramatic conflicts and the vindication of an overriding moral principle. Technically, it is actually a vocal ensemble rather than a chorus sung by a full choir. Choruses for full choirs can appear in opere serie, but they are generally absent. In oratorios, with their connection to the musical style of sacred worship, pieces for full choirs are much more common. They usually function to comment on the main dramatic conflicts. There are choruses in Isacco at the end of each part. The first one that survives, "O figlia d'umiltà", was intended to function as the original finale for Part 1. It is a chorus of shepherds that mentions the struggles with competing virtues among the characters. The second one, "Tanti secoli innanzi", is a generalized plea for the hope of Christian salvation. Mysliveček's choral writing is very skillful, clearly a legacy of his early training in composition with choirmaster in Prague. Both choruses are suitably stirring with highly developed part-writing.

== Roles in the Florence première of 1776 ==
Roles	Voice type	Première cast, 10 March 1776, Casino dei Nobili, Florence
Abramo	tenor	Valentin Adamberger
Isacco	soprano castrato	Tommaso Guarducci
Sara	soprano castrato	Antonio Goti
Gamari, a companion of Isacco	bass	Giovanni Battista Gherardi
An angel	soprano castrato	Giovanni Gelati

== Roles in the Munich revival of 1777 ==
Roles	Voice type	Cast of the Munich revival, 21 February 1777, Salvatortheater, Munich
Abramo	tenor	Giovanni Valesi
Isacco	soprano castrato	Luigi Marchesi
Sara	soprano	Unconfirmed
Gamari	bass	Gaetano Ravanni (?)
Angelo	soprano castrato	Tommaso Consoli (?)

== Synopsis ==
The libretto of Isacco is based on one of the best-known parables of the Old Testament, a lesson in obedience, trust, and filial piety set forth in the Book of Genesis, chapter 22, verses 1–19. The story is constructed around a test of faith demanded of the patriarch Abraham by God, who orders Abraham to murder his only son Isaac as a sacrifice. Abraham feels that he has no choice but to obey this heart-breaking instruction, but just as he is about to thrust a dagger into Isaac's heart, an angel sent from God stops the sacrifice. Abraham's intent to carry out the divine command is deemed sufficient to satisfy the trial of faith. Isaac is spared, and in demonstrating his willingness to die at the behest of his father, he fulfills the epithet "forerunner" (or "presager") of Christ the Redeemer alluded to in the title of the drama. The characters of Abraham, Isaac, Sarah, and the angel are all found in the Book of Genesis. In order to expand the number of characters to bring the cast closer to the standard number of six usually accommodated in opere serie, Isaac's confidant Gamari was concocted by Metastasio. The character type of a confidant is one encountered frequently in 18th-century opera.

=== Part 1 ===
The drama begins at the dwelling of Abramo and his family. Abramo has been teaching Isacco, his only son, far into the night about matters of faith and the adventures he pursued during the course of his long life. Even though Isacco is anxious to learn even more, Abramo is tired and wants to retire for the evening. Isacco sees his father as a role model and wants to follow in his footsteps. Abramo tells him about the prophecy of his birth to his mother Sara (considered highly improbable due to her advanced age after decades of infertility) and the prediction of numerous descendants that would have to originate from Isacco. The two appear to be completely devoted to each other and the teachings of their faith. Abramo dismisses him.

After Isacco has left, an angel appears and commands Abramo in God's name to sacrifice his son on Mount Moriah. Abramo reflects on this terrible command. He does not understand how earlier promises to Isacco concerning numerous descendants can be fulfilled, but he is ready to obey. He asks God for help. Then he calls his servants and shepherds and asks Gamari to wake Isaac and prepare an animal for conveyance. Sara is not to be disturbed or learn about what is going on.

But Sara has wakened up on her own and asks Abramo why he got up so early. He answers that he has to make a burnt offering to God and gather wood for it. When Sara insists on joining him, he feels that he must tell her that the sacrifice to be made is that of her son, and he asks for her consent. Sara responds by saying that obedience pleases God more than any sacrifice, and she must accept God's will.

Isaac says goodbye to his mother, without knowing what fate is intended for him and believing that he will return. Since it is clearly hard for Sara to part from him (he is not sure why), he asks Gamari to take care of her. Gamari urges the grieving shepherds to follow Sara's example of forbearance. They sing a chorus that extols the virtue of obedience, through which humans align themselves with God's will. Isacco's sad farewell and the grief of his parents is the focus of the terzetto that concludes Part 1.

=== Part 2 ===
Sara is waiting impatiently for the shepherds to return to get news. She expects to learn the worst about Isacco. Eventually, Gamari appears. He says that the last he saw of Isacco, he was alive. He left Isacco at the foot of Mount Moriah before the sacrificial act began. Isaac had carried the firewood up the mountain and nearly collapsed under the load. Sara is thoroughly frustrated at not knowing what has really happened.

Suddenly, Abramo and Isacco return to Sara with the household retainers. When Isacco appears, Sara faints from shock and elation. Isacco is surprised that Sara, usually so intrepid in the face of adversity, could now be so overwhelmed by joy. Abramo explains that humans ordinarily grow accustomed to sorrow because it occurs so often. Joy, on the other hand, is rare and unusual.

After Sara revives, Abramo explains how he prepared the sacrifice. He had told Isaac that God had decreed his sacrifice. Then Abramo bound Isaac to the altar. Isacco fell silent like an innocent lamb and offered no resistance. When Abramo then raised a dagger, a voice from heaven sounded: God had tested his obedience, and the death of Isacco was no longer necessary. Now overwhelmed with emotion, Isacco continues the story in place of Abramo. A ram had caught its horns in the thorns of a hedge, and the ram was sacrificed in his place. Isacco claims to have envied the ram for the honor of such a glorious death. But since God had planned this, he now wants to live for Him instead of dying for Him. Sara believes that God wanted to make Abramo recognize his strength. She asserts that the world should have in him an eternal model of faith, loyalty, and steadfastness. The angel appears again and renews God's promises regarding the prodigious offspring of Abramo.

At the end of the drama, Abramo summarizes the events of the day. A father sacrificed his only son. The son voluntarily took on the punishment. He carried the implements of his death on his back. He considers this a prophecy of something that will happen again one day (the implication being the sacrifice of Christ the Redeemer). The concluding chorus joins in the comparison and hopes that the glorious results of another intended divine sacrifice will not be lost.

== Vocal set pieces ==
Part I

- Aria of Isacco, "Ah, se macchiar quest'anima"
- Aria of the angel, "Quell'innocente figlio"
- Aria of Abramo, "Datti pace"
- Aria of Isacco, "Madre! Amico! Ah, non piangete"
- Aria of Sara, "Sì, ne' tormenti istessi"
- Aria of Gamari, "Siam passeggieri erranti"
- Chorus of shepherds, "O figlia d'umiltà"
- Terzetto of Isacco, Sara, and Abramo, "Lascia che un bacio" [a non-Metastasian text]

Part II

- Aria of Sara, "Deh parlate, che forse tacendo"
- Aria of Gamari, "Dal gran peso ogni momento"
- Aria of Abramo, "Entra l'uomo"
- Aria of Isacco, "A me le sue ritorte"
- Aria of Sara, "Sian are i nostri petti"
- Aria of the angel, "Ne' di felici quel germe altero"
- Chorus, "Tanti secoli innanzi"

In the music for the revival of 1777 for Munich, the chorus of shepherds from the end of Part 1 is omitted. In addition, an aria for Isacco (plus additional recitative and a march) is inserted in Part 1I between "Dal gran peso ogni momento" and "Entra l'uomo": "Veggo, o Dio" (a non-Metastatian text set to the music of the aria "Cara, o Dio, nel volto espresso" from Mysliveček's opera Artaserse of 1774). The words for the first line of the aria "A me le sue ritorte" are slightly altered with a text beginning "Sperai le sue ritorte". The music (but not the words) for Sara's aria "Sì, ne' tormenti istessi" is substituted with the music for the aria "Lasciami adesso in pace" from Mysliveček's opera Atide of 1774. The music (with minor textual alterations) for the Sara's aria "Sian are i nostri petti" is substituted with the music for the aria "Nel mar di tanti affanni" from Mysliveček's opera Motezuma of 1771.

== Modern edition ==
- Ackerman, James, ed. Josef Mysliveček: Isacco figura del redentore. Recent Researches in the Music of the Classical Era, 60. Madison, Wis.: A-R Editions, 1999. (an edition of the music for the Munich revival of 1777, not the original 1776 version performed in Florence)

== Recordings ==
- (as Abramo ed Isacco) Prague Chamber Orchestra, Peter Maag, conductor, Supraphon, 1972 (LP)
- (as Abramo e Isacco) Sinfonietta Praha, Ivan Pařík, conductor, Bonton Classics, 1991; Bonton Baltic, 1992; Supraphon, 1995, Mysliveček's Isacco misattributed to Mozart, Pařík recording, on YouTube

== Bibliography ==
- Freeman, Daniel E.. Josef Mysliveček. Minneapolis, 2022. ISBN 978-1-959770-16-9
