= Cecilia Davies =

18th-century English singer (died 1836)

Cecilia Davies (c. 1756 – 3 July 1836) was an English classical soprano who had an active international career in concerts and operas during the second half of the 18th century. In Italy she was known as "l'Inglesina". She was the sister of Marianne Davies who was the first professional glass harmonica musician. She sang in several world premieres during her career, including Thomas Arne's Love in a Village (1762, Margery) and Josef Mysliveček's La Circe (1779, title role).
