= Ezio (Mysliveček, 1777) =

Opera by Josef Mysliveček (1777)

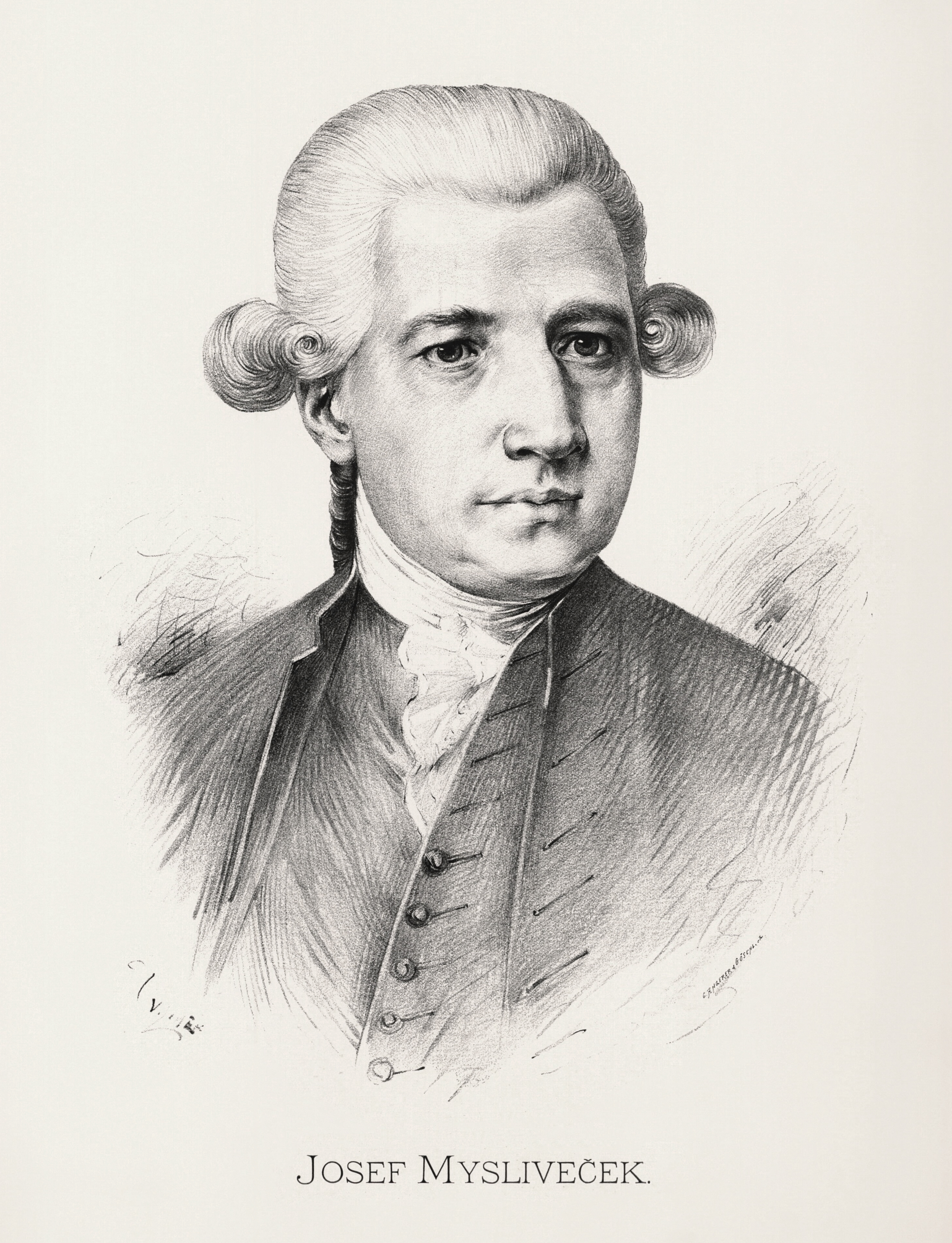
Josef Mysliveček

Ezio is an eighteenth-century Italian opera in 3 acts by the Czech composer Josef Mysliveček. It was the composer's second setting of a libretto by the Italian poet Metastasio that was first performed in Venice in 1728 with music by Nicola Porpora, one of the most popular of the Metastasian librettos in Mysliveček's day. The story is based on incidents from the lives of the 5th-century Roman emperor Valentinian III and his general Aetius. For a performance in the 1770s, it would only be expected that a libretto of such age would be abbreviated and altered to suit contemporary operatic taste. The cuts and changes in the text made for the 1777 performance of Mysliveček's opera are not attributable. All of Mysliveček's operas are of the serious type in Italian language referred to as opera seria that were usually identified with the designation dramma per musica in librettos.

== Performance history ==
The opera was first performed at the Hoftheater in Munich on 10 January 1777. The composer was to have come to Munich a year earlier, but he was detained in Italy due to the effects of syphilis. By the end of 1776, he had temporarily recovered enough to travel to Munich. In the autumn of 1777, he underwent an operation for facial disfigurement associated with his disease that resulted in his nose being burned off. Earlier research assumed that the Munich Ezio was merely a revival of the composer's setting for Naples in 1775, however it has come to light recently that the court of Maximilian III Joseph, Elector of Bavaria, insisted on completely new music, which Mysliveček did provide. The cast included the great castrato Luigi Marchesi, who had earlier appeared only in minor roles, but was given one of the leading roles in this production. His singing was considered superb by the court of Munich, and Mysliveček used his influence with the management of the Teatro San Carlo to engage him for a series of operas in Naples in 1778–79. Mysliveček's intervention enabled Marchesi to establish himself permanently as one of the leading singers in Italy. Except for Marchesi's singing, the opera was not considered to have been particularly successful, and it was overshadowed by the overwhelming success of Mysliveček's oratorio Isacco, figura del redentore, which was performed in the same theater only a few weeks after the run of Ezio ended.

== Roles ==
Role	Voice type	Premiere cast, 10 January 1777, Hoftheater, Munich
Valentiniano III, emperor of Rome, in love with Fulvia	soprano castrato	Tommaso Consoli
Fulvia, daughter of Massimo, a Roman patrician, in love with Ezio and betrothed to him	soprano	Angela Gallieni
Ezio, general of the imperial armies, in love with Fulvia	soprano castrato	Luigi Marchesi
Onoria, sister of Valentiniano, secretly in love with Ezio	soprano	Rosa Manservisi
Massimo, Roman patrician, father of Fulvia, confidant and secret enemy of Valentiniano	tenor	Domenico de Panzacchi
Varo, prefect of the Praetorian guard, friend of Ezio	tenor	uncertain ("Il Sig. N.N.")

== Vocal set pieces ==
Act I, scene 2 - Aria of Valentiniano, "Se tu la reggi al volo"
Act I, scene 3 - Aria of Ezio, "Pensa a serbarmi, o cara"
Act I, scene 4 - Aria of Fulvia, "Caro padre, a me non dei"
Act I, scene 5 - Aria of Massimo, "Il nocchier che si figura"
Act I, scene 7 - Aria of Onoria, "Quanto mai felici siete"
Act I, scene 9 - Aria of Valentiniano, "So chi t'accese"
Act I, scene 11 - Aria of Ezio, "Guarda pria"
Act I, scene 12 - Aria of Fulvia, "Finche un zeffiro soave"

Act II, scene 3 - Aria of Valentiniano, "Vi fida lo sposo"
Act II, scene 4 - Aria of Massimo, "Va, dal furor portata"
Act II, scene 6 - Aria of Ezio, "Recagli quell'acciaro"
Act II, scene 7 - Aria of Fulvia, "Quel fingere affetto"
Act II, scene 8 - Aria of Varo, "Nasce al bosco in rozza cuna"
Act II, scene 10 - Aria of Onoria, "Finché per te mi palpita"
Act II, scene 13 - Quartetto "Ecco alle mie catene"

Act III, scene 1 - Aria of Onoria, "Peni tu per un'ingrata"
Act III, scene 2 - Aria of Valentiniano, "Con le procelle in seno"
Act III, scene 5 - Rondò of Ezio, "Mi dona, mi rende" [a non-Metastasian text]
Act III, scene 10 - Aria of Massimo, "Tergi l'ingiuste lagrime"
Act III, scene 11 - Aria of Fulvia, "Ah, non son io che parlo"
Act III, scene 13- Coro "Della vita nel dubbio cammino"
Act III, scene 14 - Chorus, "Della vita ne' dubbio camino"

== See also ==
- Ezio, 1775 version
