= Motezuma (Mysliveček) =

1771 opera by Josef Mysliveček

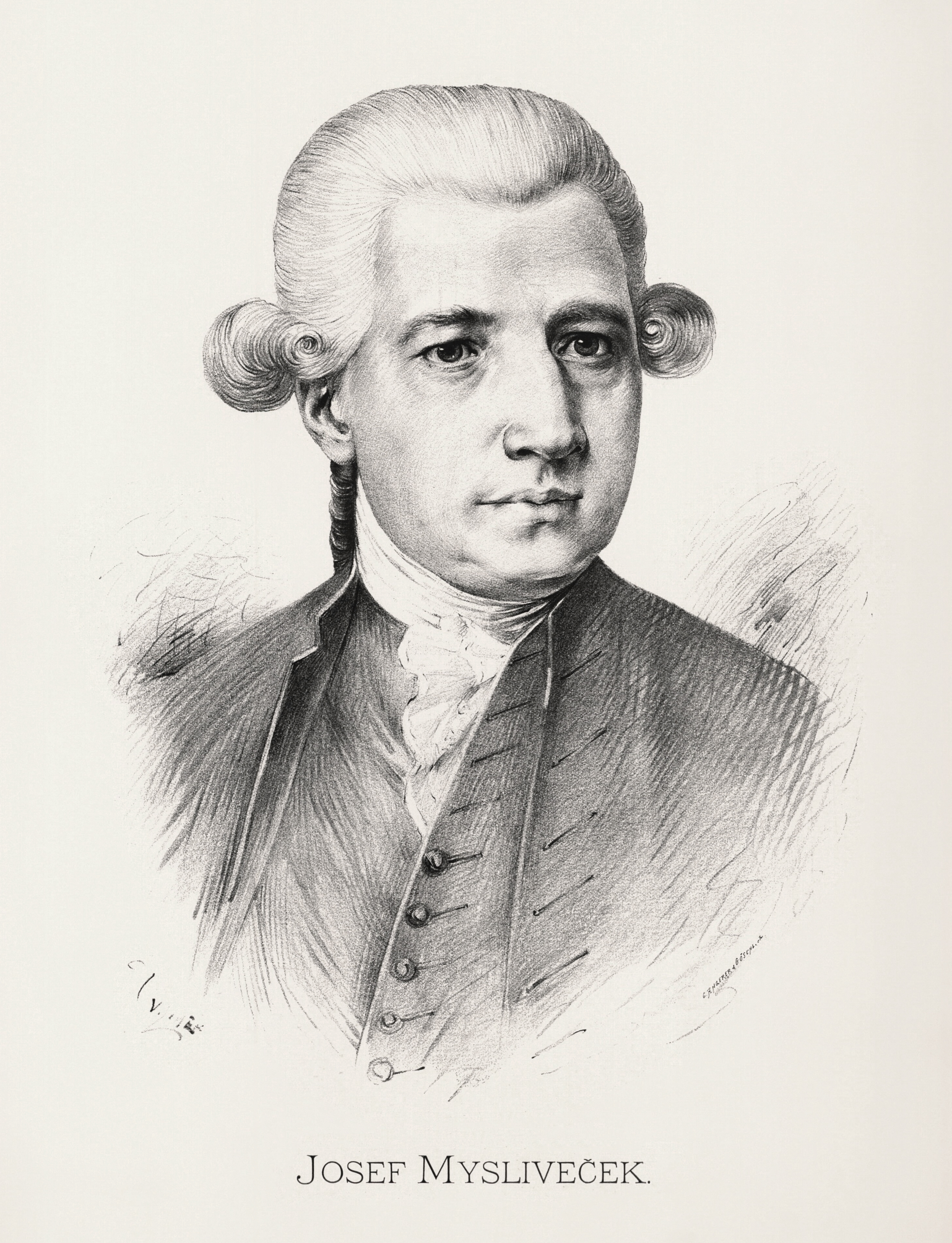
Josef Mysliveček

Motezuma is an opera seria in three acts by Josef Mysliveček set to a libretto by Vittorio Amedeo Cigna-Santi that is based on Spanish histories and chronicles about the Aztec ruler Moctezuma II. It conforms to the serious type (opera seria) that was typically set in the distant past and would usually feature the designation dramma per musica in librettos.

== Performance history ==
The opera was first performed at the Teatro della Pergola in Florence on 23 January 1771. It was the second of the composer's three operas produced in Florence, in this case at a time of intense activity as a composer in the city. The chronological setting of the opera in the early sixteenth century was unusually late for its day, when serious operas in Italian were typically set in ancient times, and rarely in a time period later than the European Middle Ages. The libretto was first set for a lavish production in 1765 at the Teatro Regio in Turin with music by Gian Francesco de Majo. It is unlikely that the Florence production was equally sumptuous, and the cast was not particularly distinguished, although it was an interesting one for the dominance of male singers (it was generally only in Rome, where women were forbidden to appear on stage, that casts would feature so many male singers). Motezuma was the first of the composer's operas to be revived in modern times (for a performance in Prague in 1931). It was likely the exotic setting and the availability of a score of the opera in Vienna, that made it so attractive for revival at that time, perhaps as a response to a trend in German-speaking lands in the 1920s to revive works by pre-Romantic German composers such as George Frideric Handel. A revival in Znojmo took place in summer 2011.

== Roles ==
Roles, voice types, premier cast
Role	Voice type	Premiere cast, 23 January 1771, Teatro della Pergola, Florence
Motezuma	soprano castrato	Carlo Nicolini
Guacozinga	soprano	Giovanna Carmignani
Ferdinando Cortes	tenor	Salvator Casetti
Teutile	soprano castrato	Marcello Pompili
Lisinga	soprano	Maddalena Mori della Casa
Pilpatoe	soprano castrato	Francesco Papi

== Vocal set pieces ==
=== Act 1 ===
- Scene 2 – Accompanied recitative for Motezuma, "Dove son? Che m'avvene?," with cavatina, "Ah, numi tiranni"
- Scene 2 – Aria of Lisinga, "So che non cangio stato"
- Scene 3 – Aria of Motezuma, "Cara fiamma del mio seno"
- Scene 4 – Aria of Guacozinga, "Nel mar di tanti affanni"
- Scene 6 – Aria of Cortes, "Rammenta al tuo sovrano"
- Scene 9 – Aria of Teutile, "Di fieri sdegni armato"
- Scene 11 – Aria of Guacozinga, "Ah no, arresta, o caro"
- Scene 12 – Aria of Motezuma, "A morir se mi condanna"

=== Act 2 ===
- Scene 2 – Aria of Cortes, "A mio danno in vano"
- Scene 4 – Aria of Lisinga, "Mi scordo lo scempio"
- Scene 5 – Aria of Pilpatoe, "Pensa che dell'impero"
- Scene 7 – Aria of Motezuma, "Cara che torna in pace"
- Scene 8 – Aria of Guacozinga, "Frena l'insano orgoglio"
- Scene 10 – Aria of Teutile, "Scherza il nocchier"
- Scene 13 – Aria of Cortes, "Perche ogn'ombra ti parta dal core"
- Scene 14 – Duet for Guacozinga and Motezuma, "Ah, se mi sei fedele"

=== Act 3 ===
- Scene 3 – Aria of Teutile, "Non lasci le sponde"
- Scene 4 – Aria of Lisinga, "M'ingombra d'orrore"
- Scene 9 – Aria of Cortes, "Basta il mio brando solo"
- Scene 10 – Aria of Motezuma, "Vorrebbe il core sperar la calma"
- Scene 11 – Accompanied recitative for Guacozinga, "Eccomi sola al fine"
- Scene 11 – Aria of Guacozinga, "Ombre dolenti"

== Recordings ==
The only complete video recording was made in 2011 in Znojmo.

Motezuma's aria "Cara che torna in pace" is available in an anthology recorded by the Czech soprano Zdena Kloubová. The recording is Panton 81 1044-2231 (1992) with the Benda Chamber Orchestra, Miroslav Hrdlička, conductor.

The overture to Mysliveček's Motezuma is included in a collection of symphonies and overtures by the composer recorded by the L'Orfeo Barockorchester, Michi Gaigg, conductor, CPO 777-050 (2004).
