= La Circe (Mysliveček) =

Opera by Josef Mysliveček

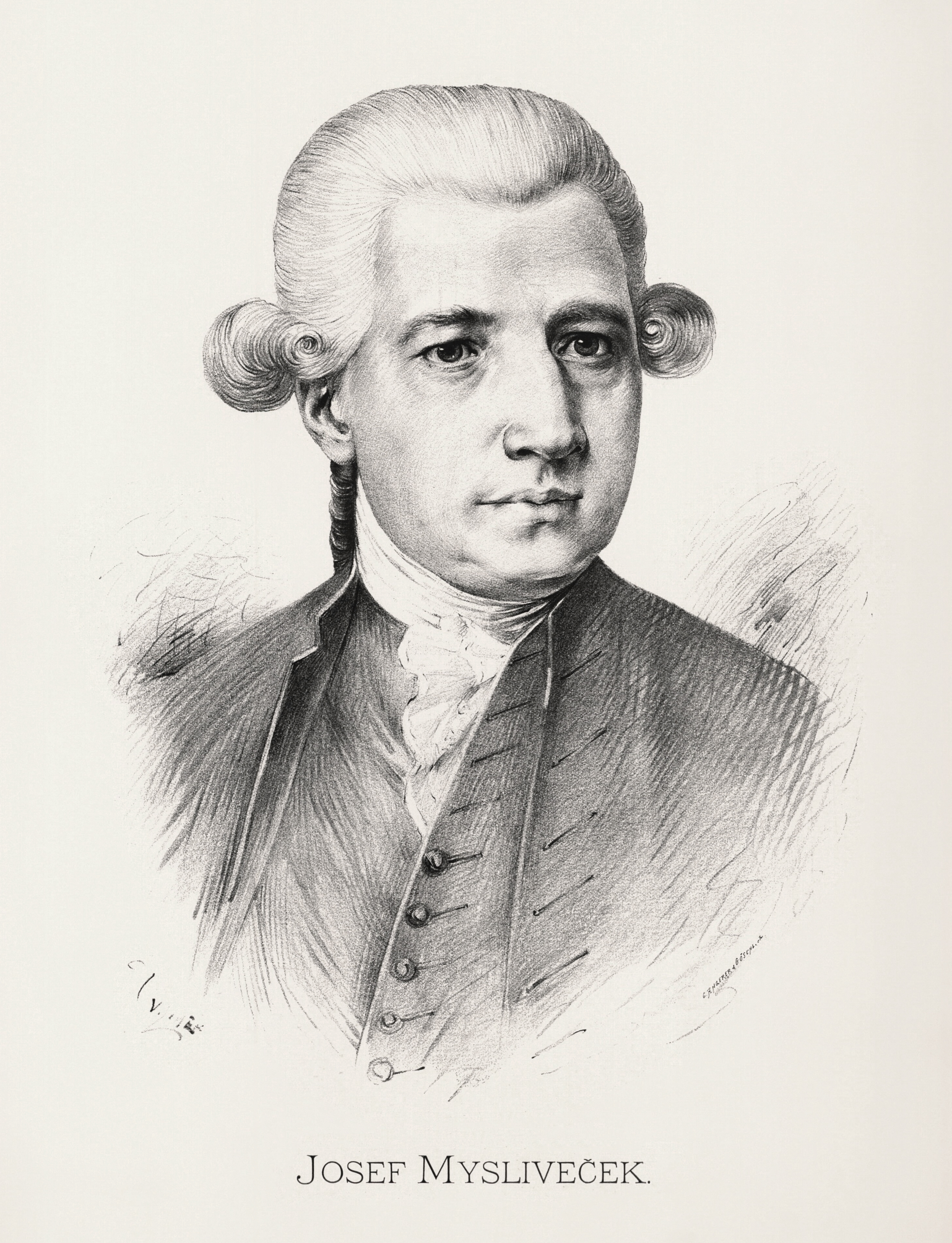
Josef Mysliveček

La Circe is an opera in three acts by Josef Mysliveček set to a libretto by Domenico Perelli that is based on Greek legends about the sorceress Circe. This opera (and all the rest of Mysliveček's operas) belong to the serious type in Italian language referred to as opera seria are usually specified with the designation dramma per musica in librettos. La Circe was one of the few operas by Myliveček set to an original libretto, rather than an adaptation of an existing libretto.

== Performance history ==
The opera was first performed at the Teatro San Benedetto in Venice on 12 May 1779 to open the theater's unique Ascension operatic season. It was the last of the composer's three operas produced in Venice (the others were his Demofoonte of 1769 and La clemenza di Tito of 1774. No complete score survives from the production, only a few individual arias that found their way into 18th-century aria collections. The cast was distinguished, including as it did the great castrato Luigi Marchesi, one of the composer's close friends and professional associates, and the noted English soprano Cecilia Davies.

== Roles ==
Cast	Voice type	Premiere, 12 May 1779, Teatro San Benedetto, Venice
Circe, queen of the Sarmatians, lover of Ulisse	soprano	Cecilia Davies
Ulisse, king of Ithaca, lover of Circe	soprano castrato	Luigi Marchesi
Prisco, king of Lazio, lover of Circe, and betrothed to Canente	tenor	Giacinto Perrone
Canente, noblewoman of Lazio, betrothed to Prisco	soprano	Vittoria Moreschi Bolzano
Sabino, ambassador of Lazio, confidant of Prisco	soprano castrato	Gaetano Quistapace
Clerinto, general of the guards of Circe	uncertain	Giuseppe Desirò

== Vocal set pieces ==
Act I, scene 3 - Cavatina of Ulisse, "Spiegar non sò qual è" (Music lost)
Act I, scene 4 - Aria of Prisco, "Ah, se per te del seno" (Music lost)
Act I, scene 5 - Aria of Circe, "Ah, come mai resistere"
Act I, scene 8 - Aria of Canente, "Sol quei che provano" (Music lost)
Act I, scene 9 - Aria of Ulisse, "Saprai con tuo rossore"
Act I, scene 11 - Aria of Sabino, "Pensa che sei Latino" (Music lost)
Act I, scene 12 - Trio for Ulisse, Prisco, and Circe, "Senti bell'idol mio"

Act II, scene 1 - Aria of Clerinto, "Così talor se mira" (Music lost)
Act II, scene 2 - Aria of Sabino, "Vado alla cara sposa" (Music lost)
Act II, scene 3 - Aria of Prisco, "Di cento dubbi, e cento" (Music lost)
Act II, scene 6 - Aria of Ulisse, "Idol mio, pietoso il fato"
Act II, scene 7 - Aria of Circe, "Parti, fuggi, t'ascondi, crudele!"
Act II, scene 9 - Aria of Canente, "È già sereno il cielo" (Music lost)
Act II, scene 11 - Duet for Ulisse and Circe, "Non sia ver, bell'idol mio" (Music lost)

Act III, scene 3 - Aria of Ulissa, "Dille, costante" (Music lost)
Act III, scene 4 - Aria of Sabino, "Nella crudele fiera tempesta" (Music lost)
Act III, scene 6 - Aria of Prisco, "Già i venti tacciono" (Music lost)
Act III, scene 10 - Aria of Circe, "D'un alma abbandonata" (Music lost)
Act III, scene 11 - Quartet for Circe, Prisco, Sabino, and Canente, "Alme amante, se sperate" (Music lost)
