= Felice Alessandri =

Italian composer (1747–1798)

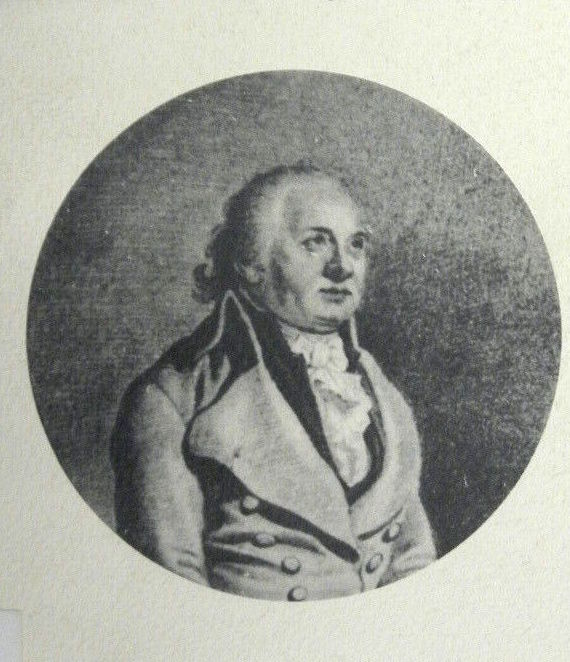
- Born: 24 November 1747; Rome
- Died: 15 August 1798 (aged 50); Casalino
- Education: Naples Conservatory
- Occupations: Keyboardist and composer

Felice Alessandri (24 November 1747 – 15 August 1798) was an Italian keyboardist and composer who was internationally active; working in Berlin, London, Paris, Saint Petersburg, and Turin. He is best known for his stage works, and he produced a total of 32 operas between 1764 and 1794. His other compositions include 6 symphonies, 6 trio sonatas for 2 violins with basso continuo, a ballet, and an oratorio.

== Life and career ==
Born in Rome, Alessandri was trained at the Naples Conservatory. After completing his studies, he became maestro di cappella at the Turin Cathedral. He then moved to Paris, where he lived for 4 years. After a brief return to Italy, he came to London in 1768, where he was active as a concert pianist and two of his comic operas were staged: La moglie fedele and Re alla caccia. He then spent time in various cities in Italy and in Saint Petersburg. He came to Berlin in 1789, where he served as choirmaster of the Berlin Hofoper from 1790 to 1792. Two of his operas were premiered in Berlin: Il ritorno di Ulysse a Penelope (1790) and Dario (1791).

In 1792, his comic opera L'Ouverture du grand opera italien a Nankin was mounted in Potsdam. Not much is known about his activities over the next six years. He died in 1798 in Casalino at the age of 50.
