= La Calliroe =

Opera by Josef Mysliveček

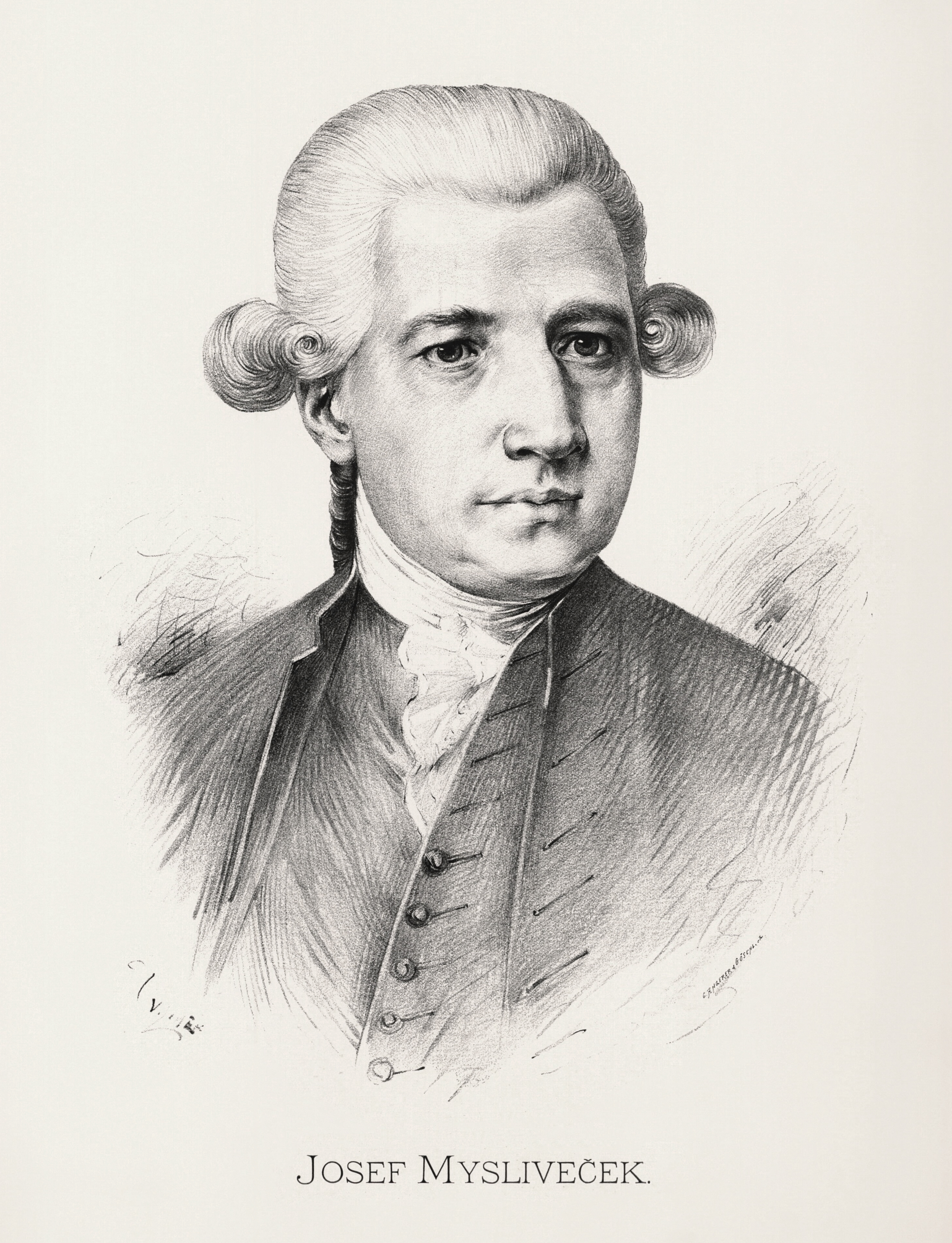
Josef Mysliveček

La Calliroe is an opera in three acts by Josef Mysliveček set to a libretto by Mattia Verazi that is based on Greek legends about the Oceanid Callirrhoe. The original setting of the text was performed as Calliroe with music by Antonio Sacchini in Schloss Ludwigsburg in 1770. This opera (and all the rest of Mysliveček's operas) belong to the serious type in Italian language referred to as opera seria that usually featured the designation dramma per musica in librettos. Vocal pieces from the opera composed for the singer Luigi Marchesi in the role of Tarsile were widely copied in eighteenth-century collections of operatic arias.

== Performance history ==
The opera was first performed at the Teatro San Carlo in Naples on 30 May 1779 to commemorate the nameday of Ferdinand, the king of Naples. La Calliroe was the first opera Mysliveček composed after returning to Italy from Munich, where he was detained for months in order to recover from an operation intended to alleviate the effects of syphilis. Taking advantage of his position as the composer most frequently engaged to compose operas for the Teatro San Carlo during the 1770s, he made certain that the finest singers who had appeared in his opera Ezio in Munich in 1777 were engaged for La Calliroe. In a letter to his father of 11 October 1777, Wolfgang Amadeus Mozart reported how Mysliveček bragged to him about his ability to influence the choice of singers at the San Carlo. One of the cast members was the great castrato Luigi Marchesi, a close professional associate of the composer, whose career was critically aided by Mysliveček's intervention. Following his appearances in Mysliveček's operas La Calliroe and L'Olimpiade the following autumn, Marchesi was able to establish himself permanently as one of the leading singers in Italy. La Calliroe was very well received by the Neapolitan musical public, one of the most successful of the nine operas Mysliveček composed for the Teatro San Carlo. It was revived in Pisa and Pontremoli in the spring of 1779 and in Siena the following summer.

== Roles ==
| Cast | Voice type | Premiere, 30 May 1778, Teatro San Carlo, Naples |
|---|---|---|
| Agricane | tenor | Giovanni Ansani |
| Calliroe | soprano | Giuseppa Maccherini Ansani |
| Tarsile | soprano castrato | Luigi Marchesi |
| Arsace | soprano castrato | Pietro Muschietti |
| Briceste | soprano | Gertrude Flavis |
| Sidonio | soprano | Antonia Rubinacci (in a breeches role) |

== Vocal set pieces ==
Act I, scene 1 - Aria of Tarsile, "Se fedel mi serba il fato"
Act I, scene 2 - Aria of Agricane, "Son guerriero e sono amante"
Act I, scene 4 - Aria of Sidonio, "Del tuo diletto del caro oggetto"
Act I, scene 5 - Aria of Calliroe, "Se dal cielo amiche stelle
Act I, scene 6 - Aria of Briceste, "Perder l'oggetto di un grato amore"
Act I, scene 8 - Cavatina for Agricane, "Care pupille belle"
Act I, scene 9 - Aria of Arsace, "Dalla fatal procella"
Act I, scene 10 - Accompanied recitative for Calliroe and Tarsile, "Ah no, Tarsile"
Act I, scene 10 - Duet for Calliroe and Tarsile, "Serena quei rai"

Act II, scene 1 - Aria of Sidonio, "So che fù troppo audace"
Act II, scene 8 - Accompanied recitative for Tarsile, "In tanto almeno"
Act II, scene 8 - Aria of Tarsile, "Parto, ma in questo addio"
Act II, scene 10 - Aria of Briceste, "Son tra notturni orrori"
Act II, scene 11 - Accompanied recitative for Calliroe, "In van ragioni"
Act II, scene 11 - Aria of Calliroe, "Tergi, o caro, il pianto amaro"
Act II, scene 13 - Aria of Arsace, "Vada, si, in campo armato"
Act II, scene 14 - Aria of Agricane, "Odo le mestre voci"
Act II, scene 15 - Accompanied recitative of Tarsile, "Che risolvi Tarsile?"
Act II, scene 15 - Aria of Tarsile, "Mille cose in un momento"

Act III, scene 1 - Aria of Calliroe - "Ritorna nell'alma il dolce sereno"
Act III, scene 4 - Aria of Agricane, "Da cento affanni e cento"
Act III, scene 7 - Aria (Rondò) of Tarsile, "Volgi ridente, o cara"

== Score ==
The complete score of La Calliroe is available for study online on the Italian website Internet Culturale in the form of a reproduction of a manuscript once in the possession of the Teatro San Carlo of Naples.
