= Medonte (Mysliveček) =

Opera by Josef Mysliveček

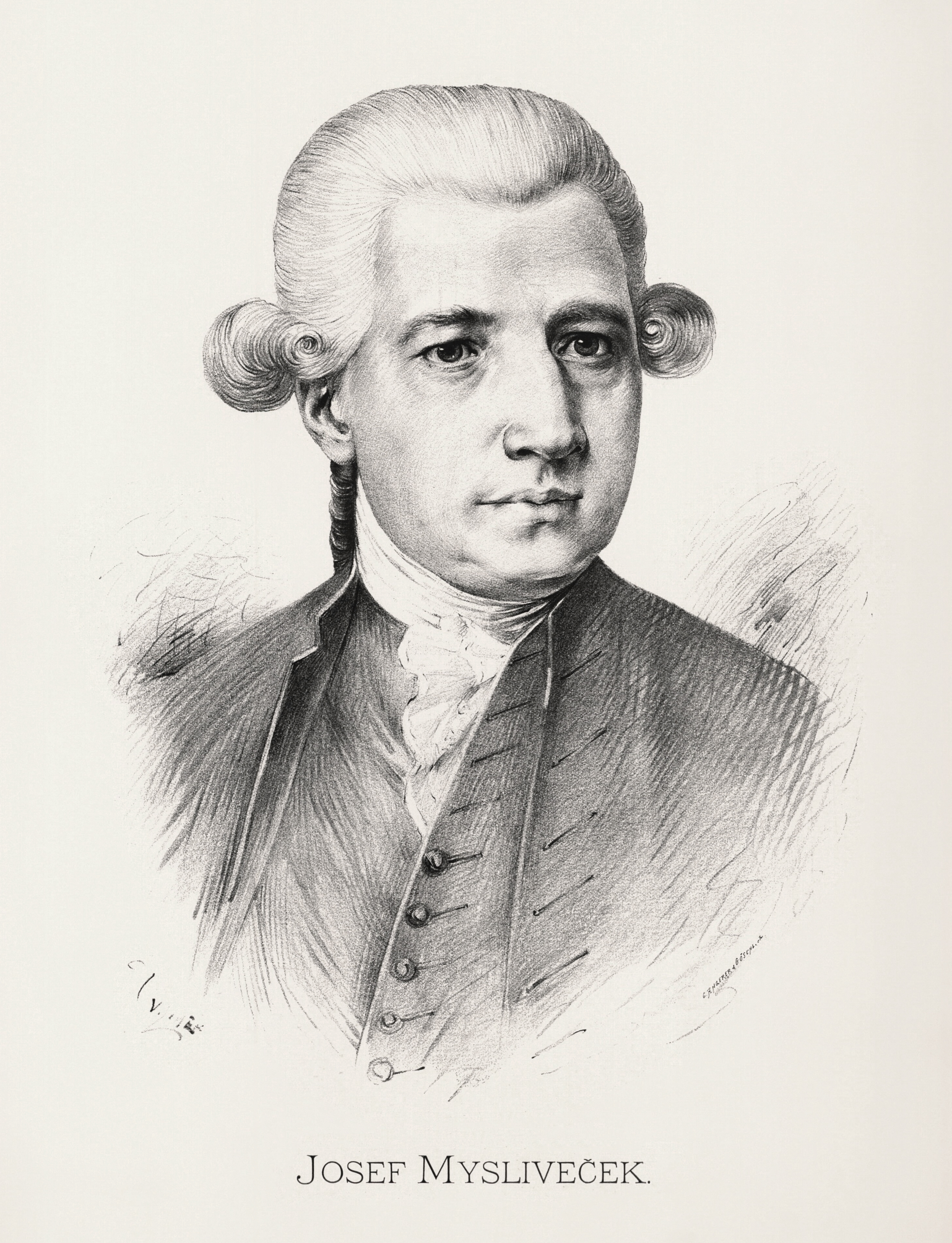
Josef Mysliveček

Il Medonte is an Italian opera in three acts by Josef Mysliveček set to a libretto by Giovanni de Gamerra that was first set to music by Felice Alessandri in Milan in 1774 but found greater success in a setting by Giuseppe Sarti first performed in Florence in 1777. Like all of the composer's operas, it belongs to the serious genre in Italian referred to as opera seria that would usually carry the designation dramma per musica in librettos.

== Performance history ==
The opera was first performed at the Teatro Argentina in Rome on 26 January 1780. It was a moderate success that redeemed the failure of the composer's Armida, which was a spectacular failure at Milan during the same carnival operatic season of 1780. In modern times, it was revived for performances in Opava in 1961 and Leverkusen in 2010. The most famous vocal piece from the opera is the rondò "Luci belle, se piagente," which was widely disseminated in Europe until the early 19th century and was indeed one of the most outstanding vocal compositions of its era. It was originally sung by Tommaso Consoli in the role of Arsace. All of the original performers in the opera were male, since women were prohibited from appearing on stage in Roman theaters until Pius VII was elevated to the Holy See in the year 1800.

== Roles ==
Role	Voice type	Premiere cast, 26 January 1780, Teatro Argentina, Rome
Medonte, King of Epirus, lover and betrothed of Selene	tenor	Giacomo David
Selene, Princess of Argos, daughter of Aglauro, king of Argos, in love with Arsace	soprano castrato	Michelangelo Bologna
Arsace, Royal prince of Dodone and supreme commander of the armies of Epirus	soprano castrato	Tommaso Consoli
Zelinda, Royal princess of Larissa, a tributary and friend of Medonte	soprano castrato	Silvestro Fiammenchi
Evandro, a Grande of the kingdom of Epirus and captain of the royal guards	soprano castrato	Biagio Parca
Talete, one of the notables of the kingdom of Argos	alto castrato	Lorenzo Galeffi

== Vocal set pieces ==
Act I, scene 1 - Cavatina of Arsace, "Deh, s'affretti, astri tiranni"
Act I, scene 1 - Aria of Evandro, "Merta gli allori al crine"
Act I, scene 2 - Aria of Arsace, "Fra gli affanni"
Act I, scene 3 - Aria of Zelinda, "Ch'io presso del soglio"
Act I, scene 4 - Aria of Selena, "Ah, caro ben vicina"
Act I, scene 5 - Aria of Medonte, "Pensa che sol per poco"
Act I, scene 7 - Accompanied recitative for Selena and Arsace, "Tu parli di morire?"
Act I, scene 7 - Duet for Selena and Arsace, "Ah, se mi sei fedete"

Act II, scene 1 - Aria of Talete, "Vedrò fier sempre in calma"
Act II, scene 3 - Aria of Zelinda, "Se vuoi dell'indegno"
Act II, scene 5 - Aria of Medonte, "Serba costante"
Act II, scene 7 - Accompanied recitative of Selena, "Dov'è, ah dov'è, son io"
Act II, scene 7 - Cavatina of Selena, "Adorata mia speranza"
Act II, scene 9 - Accompanied recitative of Arsace, "Cedere è forza, o cara"
Act II, scene 9 - Aria (Rondò) of Arsace, "Luci belle, se piangete"
Act II, scene 12 - Aria of Evandro, "Vedrai se un fido core"
Act II, scene 13 - Trio for Selena, Arsace, and Medonte, "Tremate empi"

Act III, scene 2 - Aria of Medonte, "Perfidi io sciolgo il freno"
Act III, scene 3 - Aria of Arsace, "Scioglio cara un dolce riso"
Act III, scene 4 - Aria of Selena, "Mesti affanni"

== Score ==
The complete score of Medonte is available for study online on the website gallica.bnf.fr in the form of a reproduction of the autograph manuscript housed in the collection of the Bibliothèque nationale de France.

== Recording ==
- Myslivecek: Medonte Loriana Castellano (mezzo-soprano), Thomas Michael Allen (tenor), Juanita Lascarro (soprano), Ulrike Andersen (contralto), Susanne Bernhard (soprano), Stephanie Elliott (soprano). L'arte del mondo, de:Werner Ehrhardt (Dirigent). Deutsche Harmonia Mundi 3CD, 2011.
