= List of operas by Francesco Bianchi =

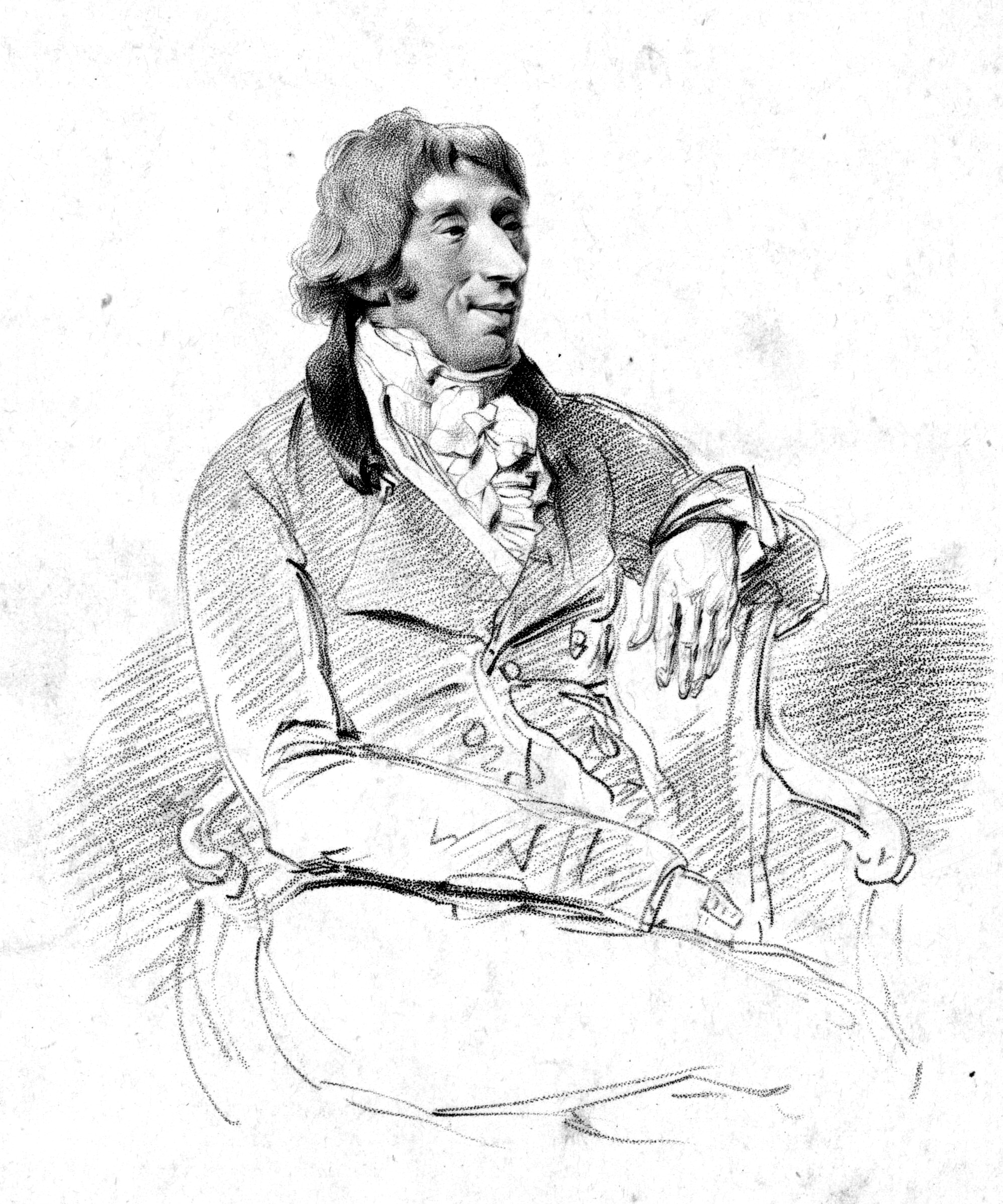
Francesco Bianchi in 1805

This is a complete list of operas by Francesco Bianchi (1752–1810).

Bianchi had a varied career, working in different places and different styles and with many different collaborators. Not only was he active in Italy (in Venice, Naples, Florence, Rome, Milan, Turin, Bologna, Brescia, Cremona, and Padua) but also frequently in Paris and London.

Although he wrote 41 'serious' drammi per musica (opere serie), he also composed 16 opéras comiques and 14 opere buffe, as well as one each of works designated azione scenica, azione teatrale, drame héroïque, drame lyrique, festa teatrale, and opera giocosa.

== List ==
Title	Genre	Subdivisions	Libretto	Première date	Place, theatre	Notes
Giulio Sabino	dramma per musica			1772	Cremona	
Il gran Cidde	dramma per musica	3 acts	Gioacchino Pizzi after Pierre Corneille	27 January 1773	Florence, Teatro della Pergola	
Demetrio	dramma per musica	3 acts	Metastasio	Carnival 1774	Cremona	
Eurione	dramma per musica	3 acts	Antonio Papi	25 May 1775	Pavia, Teatro Quattro Signori	
La réduction de Paris	drame lyrique	3 acts	Barnabé Farmian de Rosoi	30 September 1775	Paris, Théâtre des Italiens	
Le mort marié	opéra comique	2 acts	Michel-Jean Sedaine	25 October 1776	Fontainebleau, Théâtre Royal de la Cour	
Erifile	dramma per musica	3 acts	Giovanni de Gamerra	29 January 1779	Florence, Teatro della Pergola	
L'innocenza perseguitata	opera buffa	3 acts		Carnival 1779	Rome, Teatro delle Dame	
Castore e Polluce	dramma per musica	4 acts	Carlo Innocenzo Frugoni, after Pierre-Joseph Bernhard's Castor et Pollux	10 September 1779	Florence, Teatro della Pergola	2nd version: Padua 1780
Il Demetrio	dramma per musica	2 acts (26 scenes)		3 January 1780	Venice, Teatro (Gallo) San Benedetto	
Arbace	dramma per musica	3 acts	Gaetano Sertor	20 January 1781	Naples, Real Teatro di San Carlo	
Demofoonte	dramma per musica	3 acts	Metastasio	Spring 1781	Genoa, Teatro di Sant'Agostino	
Venere e Adone	azione teatrale	2 acts	Ferdinando Casori	14 September 1781	Florence, Teatro della Pergola	
Zemira	dramma per musica	2 acts	Gaetano Sertor	4 November 1781	Naples, Real Teatro di San Carlo	2nd version: Padua 1786
L'Olimpiade	dramma per musica	3 acts	Metastasio	26 December 1781	Milan, Teatro alla Scala	
Il trionfo della pace	festa teatrale	2 acts	Cesare Olivieri	16 April 1782	Turin, Teatro Regio	
La Zulima	dramma per musica	3 acts	Carlo Olivieri, after Voltaire	4 November 1782	Naples, Real Teatro di San Carlo	
Medonte	dramma per musica	2 acts		14 November 1782	London, King's Theatre in the Haymarket	pasticcio containing music by many hands incl. Bianchi, but principally Giuseppe Sarti
L'astrologa	opera buffa	3 acts	Pietro Chiari	December 1782	Naples, Teatro del Fondo	
Piramo e Tisbe	dramma per musica	3 acts (32 scenes)	Gaetano Sertor	7 January 1783	Venice, Teatro La Fenice	
Briseide	dramma per musica	3 acts	Francesco Sebastiano Gambino	27 December 1783	Turin, Teatro Regio	
Aspardi, principe di Battriano	dramma per musica	3 acts	Gaetano Sertor	Carnival 1784	Rome, Teatro delle Dame	
Cajo Mario	dramma per musica	3 acts	Gaetano Roccaforte	30 May 1784	Naples, Real Teatro di San Carlo	
La villanella rapita	opera giocosa	2 acts	Filippo Livigni	29 August 1784	Süttör, Eszterháza Theater	Re-staged on 28 November 1785, Vienna, at the Burgtheater, with the vocal terzetto "Mandina amabile" K. 480 and the vocal quartet "Dite almeno in che mancai?" K. 479 by Mozart – staged besides under the title of Le gelosie di Pippo in Lisbon in 1796
La finta principessa	opera buffa	2 acts	Filippo Livigni	autumn 1784	Bologna, Teatro Formagliari	
Il disertore francese	dramma per musica	3 acts (34 scenes)	Bartolomeo Benincasa	26 December 1784	Venice, Teatro (Gallo) San Benedetto	
Alessandro nell'Indie	dramma per musica	3 acts (36 scenes)	Metastasio	28 January 1785	Venice, Teatro (Gallo) San Benedetto	
La stravagante inglese	opera buffa	2 acts	Giovanni Greppi	autumn 1785	Venice, Teatro San Moisè	
Le villanelle astute	opera buffa	2 acts	Giuseppe Foppa	Carnival 1786	Venice, Teatro San Samuele	
Alonso e Cora	dramma per musica	3 acts (24 scenes)	Giuseppe Foppa, after Ferdinando Moretti's libretto Idalide	7 February 1786	Venice, Teatro (Gallo) San Benedetto	
Mesenzio, re d'Etruria	dramma per musica	2 acts	Ferdinando Casorri	4 November 1786	Naples, Real Teatro San Carlo	
L'orfano cinese	dramma per musica	3 acts (29 scenes)	after Voltaire	30 January 1787	Venice, Teatro (Gallo) San Benedetto	
Artaserse	dramma per musica	3 acts	Metastasio	11 June 1787	Padua, Teatro Nuovo	
Pizzarro	dramma per musica	3 acts		summer 1787	Brescia, Accademia degli Erranti	
Scipione africano	dramma per musica	3 acts	Nicolò Minato	13 August 1787	Naples, Real Teatro di San Carlo	
Il ritratto	opera buffa	2 acts	Saverio Zini	autumn 1787	Naples, Teatro del Fondo	
Calto	dramma per musica	3 acts (23 scenes)	Giuseppe Foppa, after Ossian	23 January 1788	Venice, Teatro (Venier) San Benedetto	
La morte di Cesare	dramma per musica	2 acts (29 scenes)	Gaetano Sertor, after Shakespeare's Julius Caesar	27 December 1788	Venice, Teatro (Grimani) San Samuele	
La fedeltà tra le selve	opera buffa	2 acts	Michelangelo Prunetti	Carnival 1789	Rome, Teatro Capranica	It includes 4 arias by Valentino Fioravanti
Nitteti	dramma per musica	3 acts	Metastasio	20 April 1789	Milan, Teatro alla Scala	
Daliso e Delmita	dramma per musica	2 acts	Giovanni de Gamerra	12 June 1789	Padua, Teatro Nuovo	
Il finto astrologo	opera buffa	2 acts	Angelo Mariani	Carnival 1790	Rome, Teatro Capranica	
L'Arminio	dramma per musica	3 acts	Ferdinando Moretti	6 September 1790	Florence, Teatro della Pergola	
La vendetta di Nino, o sia Semiramide	dramma per musica	3 acts	Pietro Giovannini, after Voltaire	12 November 1790	Naples, Real Teatro San Carlo	second version in 2 acts, 1794, London, King’s Theater in the Haymarket
Caio Ostilio	dramma per musica	2 acts	Eustachio Manfredi	Carnival 1791	Rome, Teatro Argentina	
La dama bizzarra	opera buffa	2 acts	Tommaso Mariani	Carnival 1791	Rome, Teatro Capranica	
Deifile	azione scenica	2 acts		March 1791	Venice, Palazzo Brünner	
La sposa in equivoco	opera buffa	2 acts	Saverio Zini	autumn 1791	Venice, Teatro San Moisè	
Seleuco, re di Siria	dramma per musica	3 acts (29 scenes)	Mattia Botturini, after Antioco by Apostolo Zeno and Pietro Pariati	26 December 1791	Venice, Teatro (Venier) San Benedetto	
Aci e Galatea	dramma per musica	2 acts (28 scenes)	Giuseppe Foppa	13 October 1792	Venice, Teatro (Venier) San Benedetto	revision 1795 London, King's Theater in the Haymarket
Tarara, o sia La virtù premiata	dramma per musica	3 acts (30 scenes)	Gaetano Sertor	26 December 1792	Venice, Teatro La Fenice	
Il cinese in Italia	opera buffa	2 acts	Alessandro Pepoli	autumn 1793	Venice, Teatro San Moisè	staged also under the title of L'olandese in Venice in Turin in 1794
La secchia rapita	opera buffa	2 acts	Angelo Anelli	13 February 1794	Venice, Teatro (Grimani) San Samuele)	revision 1796 Milan with a new act by Zingarelli
Ines de Castro	dramma per musica	3 acts	Luigi de Sanctis, after Cosimo Giotti	30 May 1794	Naples, Real Teatro di San Carlo	Revised version in 3 acts (35 scenes), 14 October 1795, Venice, Teatro (Venier) San Benedetto
La capricciosa ravveduta	opera buffa	2 acts	Caterino Mazzolà	autumn 1794	Venice, Teatro San Moisè	
Antigona	dramma per musica	2 acts	Lorenzo Da Ponte	24 May 1796	London, King's Theatre in the Haymarket	
Il consiglio imprudente	opera buffa	1 act	Lorenzo Da Ponte, after Carlo Goldoni	20 December 1796	London, King's Theatre in the Haymarket	
Merope	dramma per musica	2 acts	Lorenzo Da Ponte, after Voltaire	10 June 1797	London, King's Theatre in the Haymarket	
Cinna	dramma per musica	3 acts	Lorenzo Da Ponte, after Angelo Anelli?	20 February 1798	London, King's Theatre in the Haymarket	
Alzira	dramma per musica	2 acts	Gaetano Rossi, after Voltaire	28 February 1801	London, King's Theatre in the Haymarket	
La morte di Cleopatra	dramma per musica	2 acts	Serafino Buonaiuti	30 April 1801	London, King's Theater in the Haymarket	
Armida	dramma per musica	2 acts	Lorenzo Da Ponte, after Torquato Tasso's Gerusalemme liberata	1 June 1802	London, King's Theatre in the Haymarket	
L'avaro	opéra comique	2 acts	Giovanni Bertati	30 March 1804	Paris, Théâtre des Italiens	
Blaisot et Pasquin	opéra comique	1 act	Alexandre-Joseph Leroy de Bacre, Francis d'Allarde, and Martinelli	9 April 1804	Paris, Théâtre Montansier (Salle de l'Opéra Bouffe)	
Le maître de chapelle	opéra comique			3 May 1804	Paris, Théâtre des Italiens	
Corali, ou La lanterne magique	opéra comique	1 act	André Joseph Grétry, neveu	7 July 1804	Paris, Théâtre Molière	
L'eau et le feu, ou Le gascon à l'épreuve	opéra comique	1 act	Charles Gaugiran-Nanteuil	10 August 1804	Paris, Théâtre Montansier-Variétés (Variétés-Montansier, galeries du Palais-Royal)	
Le contrat signé d'avance, ou Laquelle est ma femme?	opéra comique	1 act	F. Ligier	29 September 1804	Paris, Théâtre Molière	
Le gascon, gascon malgré lui	opéra comique	1 act	P. Guillet and Eugène Hus	17 November 1804	Paris, Théâtre Molière	
Amour et coquetterie	opéra comique	1 act	André-Jacques Coffin-Rony	7 January 1806	Paris, Théâtre des Jeunes-Élèves	
Le livre des destins	opéra comique	1 act	Félix Nogaret	2 February 1806	Paris, Théâtre des Jeunes-Élèves	
La famille venitienne, ou Le château d'Orseno	opéra comique	3 acts	Frédéric Dupetit-Méré	7 May 1806	Paris, Théâtre des Jeunes-Artistes (rue de Bondy)	
Monsieur Jugolo, ou Les chercheurs	opéra comique	1 act		22 May 1806	Paris, Théâtre des Jeunes-Élèves	
Le château mystérieux, ou Le crime commis et vengé	opéra comique	3 acts	Maxime de Redon and Charles Rivière Defresnoy	12 July 1806	Paris, Théâtre des Jeunes-Élèves	
Le triomphe d'Alcide à Athènes	drame héroïque	2 acts	Pierre-Louis Moline and Adrien-Firmin Pillon	September 1806	Paris, Théâtre Molière	
La soeur officieuse, ou Addresse et mensonge	opéra comique	1 act	Maxime de Redon and Charles Rivière Defresnoy	18 October 1806	Paris, Théâtre des Jeunes-Élèves	
Almeria, ou L'écossaise fugitive	opéra comique	3 acts	Marie-Adélaïde Barthélemy-Hadot	8 December 1806	Paris, Théâtre des Jeunes-Élèves	
Les illustres infortunés, ou La souveraine vindicative	opéra comique	3 acts	Maxime de Redon and Charles Rivière Defresnoy	8 January 1807	Paris, Théâtre des Jeunes-Élèves	
Le pied de boeuf et la queue du chat	opéra comique	3 acts	Pierre-Joseph Charrin and Maxime de Redon	9 June 1807	Paris, Théâtre des Jeunes-Artistes (rue de Bondy)	

== Doubtful operas ==
- Mitridate (1781, Genova)
- Attalo, re di Bitinia (1783, Venice)
- Demofoonte (1783, Venice)
- La caccia di Enrico IV (1784, Venice)
- Il barone a forza (1785, Rome)
- Li sposi in commedia (1785, Venice)
- Il nuovo Don Chischiotte (1788, Voltri)
- Il gatto (1789, Brescia)
- La calamità dei cuori (1789, Padua)
- Il difensore (1793–94, Vienna)
- Zenobia (1797, London)
- Telemaco (v. 1800, Cremona)
- Vonima e Mitridate (1803, Venice)

== Isolated songs ==
Surviving play-texts suggest that Bianchi contributed isolated numbers to La premiere représentation by Pierre-Joseph Charrin, first performed at the Théâtre des Nouveaux Troubadours in Paris on 20 September 1806; and to Collin d'Harleville aux Champs-Élysées by Joseph Aude, Décour and Defrénoy, first given in Paris on 20 March 1806. He is also credited as having arranged the music, previously chosen by the author, for Les Sirènes by Jean-Baptiste-Augustin Hapdé, first performed at the Théâtre des Jeunes-Artistes on 24 January 1807.
