= Demetria =

Demetria may refer to:

- Alternative form of Demeter (Δημήτηρ), Greek goddess of harvest
- Demetria (bacteria), a genus of bacteria from the family Dermacoccaceae
- Demetria (name), a feminine given name (and list of people with that name)
- Demetria, a fictional planet in the CrossGen comics Sigilverse

== See also ==
- Demetrias (disambiguation)
- Demetrius (disambiguation)
- Demeter (disambiguation)
