= Symphony No. 32 (Mozart) =

1779 composition by W. A. Mozart

- by W. A. Mozart
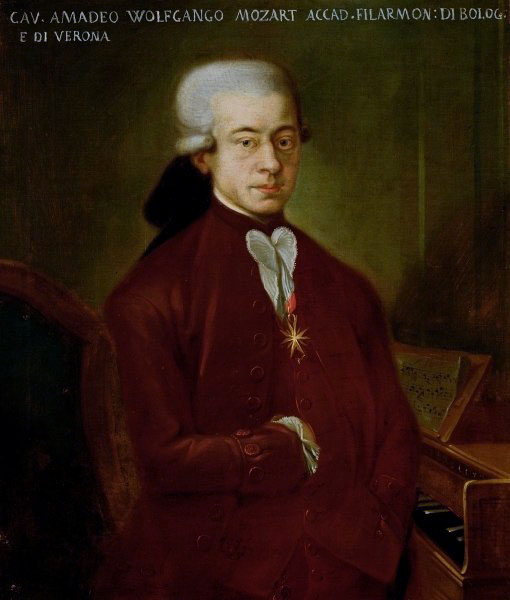
- Mozart in 1777, wearing the Papal Order of the Golden Spur
- Key: G major
- Catalogue: K. 318
- Composed: 1779
- Duration: 8 minutes
- Movements: 3
- Scoring: Orchestra

The Symphony No. 32 in G major, K. 318, was written by Wolfgang Amadeus Mozart in 1779, after his return from Paris.

== Structure and analysis ==
The symphony, scored for 2 flutes, 2 oboes, 2 bassoons, 4 horns, 2 trumpets, strings, and timpani, and is in the form of an Italian overture, consisting of three brief movements that follow one another without break:

1. Allegro spiritoso,
2. Andante, 3/8
3. Primo tempo,

The form is not a true Italian overture or a da capo overture. The first movement unfolds as if in sonata form, with no expositional repeat. The two theme groups are stated amidst transitional material. Still in the first movement, a development begins that leads to the first theme of the exposition being worked in a number of keys. At the point where the music is in the dominant and seemingly ready to move the tonic for a recapitulation, the music segues to the slow movement. The slow movement is in rondo form (A–B–A–C–A–B). Again, right when the listener is expecting the rondo refrain to return, the music segues to the third movement, which continues the development of the first theme from the first movement before a "reverse recapitulation" is performed where the two themes of the first movement are recapitulated in opposite order.

The work was earlier considered as an overture to Mozart's operas Thamos, King of Egypt or Zaide, but this is unlikely because the dates of those works do not coincide with the autograph manuscript and also because the overture was generally the last piece to be composed for a stage work. In 1785 Mozart used the symphony as an overture for a Vienna performance of Francesco Bianchi's opera La villanella rapita.

The autograph score is today located in the New York Public Library for the Performing Arts.
