= Demetrio =

Demetrio may refer to:

- Demetrio, a variant of the name Demetrius
- Demetrio (Metastasio), an opera libretto in three acts by Pietro Metastasio
- Demetrio (1773), set by Josef Mysliveček
- Demetrio (1779), reset by Josef Mysliveček
- Demetrio (Mayr), set by Simon Mayr
- Demetrio Crisantes (born 2004), American baseball player

== See also ==
- Demetrius (disambiguation)
- San Demetrio (disambiguation)
