= Zaide =

Unfinished opera by Wolfgang Amadeus Mozart

- Singspiel by W. A. Mozart
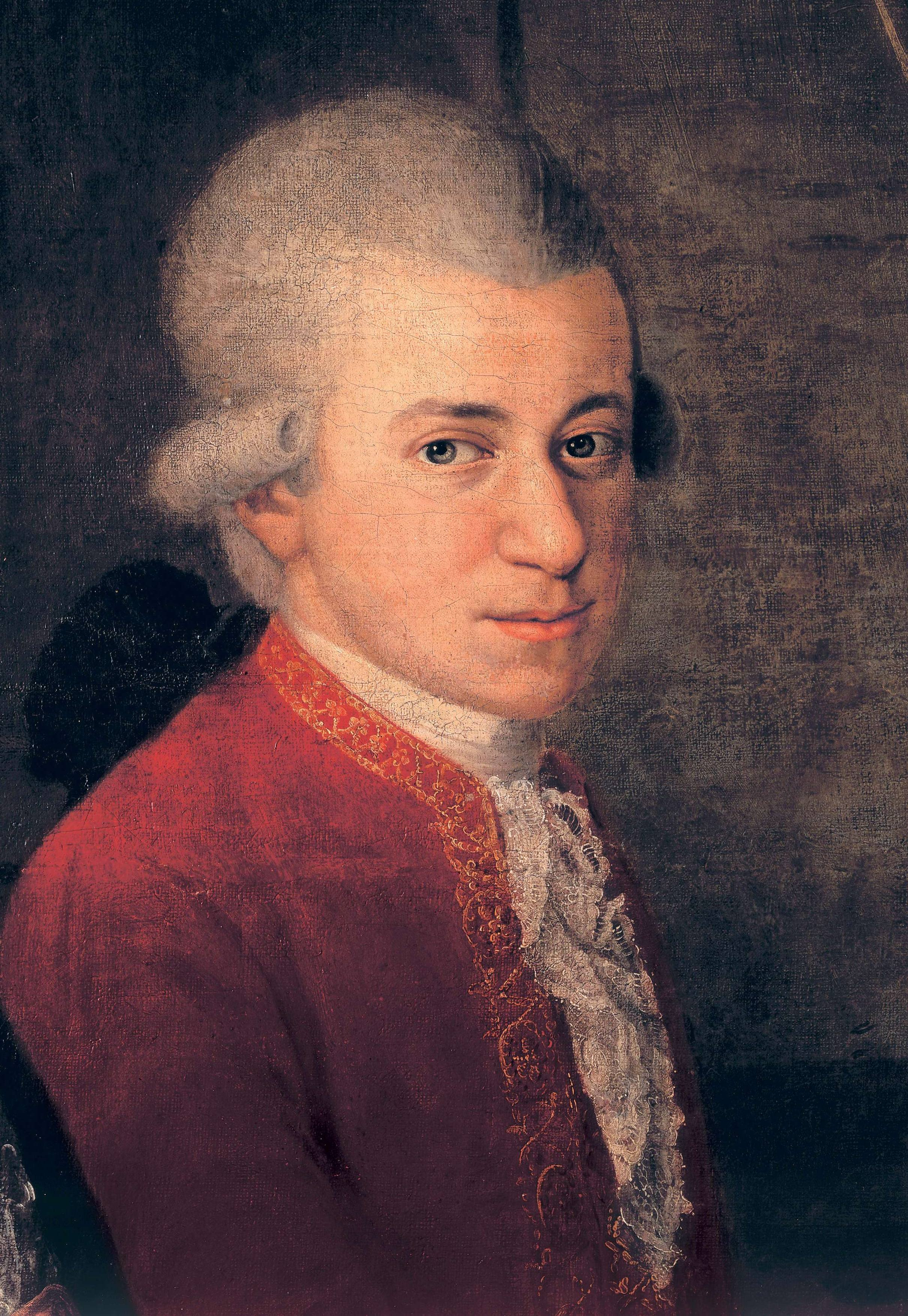
- Detail of Wolfgang from the 1780–81 Portrait of the Mozart Family
- Librettist: Johann Andreas Schachtner
- Language: German

Zaide (originally, Das Serail) is an unfinished German-language opera, K. 344, written by Wolfgang Amadeus Mozart in 1780. Emperor Joseph II, in 1778, was in the process of setting up an opera company for the purpose of performing German opera. One condition required of the composer to join this company was that he should write a comic opera. At Salzburg in 1779 Mozart began work on a new opera (now known as Zaide although Mozart did not give it such a title). It contains spoken dialogue, which also classifies it as a Singspiel (literally, "singing play"). Only the arias and ensembles from the first two acts were composed. Missing are an overture and third act.

It was popular at the time for operas to depict the rescue of enslaved Westerners from Muslim courts, since Muslim pirates were preying on Mediterranean shipping, particularly to obtain slaves for various purposes. This story portrays Zaide's effort to save her beloved, Gomatz.

Mozart was composing for a German libretto by Johann Andreas Schachtner, set in Turkey, which was the scene of his next, completed rescue Singspiel (Die Entführung aus dem Serail). He soon abandoned Zaide, to work on Idomeneo, and never returned to the project. The work was lost until after his death, when Constanze Mozart, his wife, found it in his scattered manuscripts in 1799. The fragments would not be published until 1838, and its first performance was held in Frankfurt on January 27, 1866, the 110th anniversary of Mozart's birth. Zaide has since been said to be the foundations of a masterpiece, and received critical acclaim. The tender soprano air, "Ruhe sanft, mein holdes Leben" is the only number that might be called moderately familiar.

The title Zaide was supplied by the Mozart researcher Johann Anton André, who first published the score, including his own completion of it, in the 1830s. André's father Johann André had set the same text to music, before Mozart commenced his singspiel.

Modern companion pieces to Zaide have been written by both Luciano Berio and Chaya Czernowin.

In modern performances, Mozart's Symphonies No. 26, K. 184, or No. 32, K. 318 – which was composed around the same time as Zaide and later used as an overture to Francesco Bianchi's La villanella rapita (1784) – are often given as an overture to Zaide. Completions of the opera may use a pastiche of Mozart's concert arias or, more popularly, music from Thamos, King of Egypt, also from the same period of Mozart's career.

== Style ==
Zaide can neither be described as opera buffa or opera seria; it contained elements of both forms, and parallels may be drawn to both genre in Mozart's work. Zaide is also notable as being one of only two dramatic pieces by Mozart to contain melodrama (the other being Thamos, King of Egypt). Most of the spoken dialogue to Zaide has been lost, though there have been various attempts in modern times to write new dialogue to substitute for Schachtner's lost words.

== Performance history ==
In 1995, le Théâtre Royal de la Monnaie in Brussels presented Zaide in a production helmed by modern choreographer Lucinda Childs in her directing debut. In honor of the 250th anniversary of Mozart's birth, a production of Zaide directed by Peter Sellars debuted at the Wiener Festwochen in 2006; it was later presented at the Mostly Mozart Festival in New York and the Barbican Centre in London. Sellars took the remaining fragments of Zaide and added excerpts from the composer's incidental music to the play Thamos, King of Egypt, which, like Zaide, was written when Mozart was 23. Taking off from the opera's theme of slavery, he set it in a contemporary sweatshop and cast it with African-American and Asian singers. The production featured the Concerto Köln under the direction of Louis Langrée, sets by George Tsypin, lighting by James F. Ingalls, and costumes by Gabriel Berry. A revival, with the Camerata Salzburg in the pit, was presented at the Aix-en-Provence Festival in 2008.

== Roles ==
| Role | Voice type | Premiere cast, January 27, 1866 (Conductor: –) |
|---|---|---|
| Zaide | soprano | Deiner |
| Gomatz | tenor | Georg Müller-Gormann |
| Allazim | bass | Carl Pichler |
| Sultan Soliman | tenor | Carl Baumann |
| Osmin | bass | |
| Zaram, captain of the Guard | speaking role | |
| Four slaves | tenor | |

== Synopsis ==
Zaide falls in love with Gomatz, a slave, which strikes up jealousy and rage in the Sultan, who happens to also admire her. After capture she chooses a free life with Gomatz rather than a good life with the Sultan. Allazim encourages the sultan to consider Gomatz as a man, not as a slave. The final surviving quartet suggests Zaide and Gomatz are sentenced to punishment or execution. This is where Mozart's manuscript breaks off.

There are similarities with Voltaire's play Zaïre (Zara) in which Zaïre, a Christian slave who had been captured as a baby falls in love with Osman, the Sultan of Jerusalem. Osman wrongly believes Zaïre and another Christian slave Nerestan (Gomatz in Mozart's opera) are lovers and kills Zaïre in a jealous rage and then kills himself. The elderly Lusignan, a prisoner of the Sultan (paralleled in the character Allazim) recognizes Zara and Nerestan as his children as she escorts him to safety. From the surviving arias we can deduce a few differences between Voltaire's play and Mozart's opera. By Act II of the opera Zaide, Gomatz, and possibly Allazim actually escape, only to be captured once more. In the opera there is no evidence that Mozart intended to cast Zaide, Gomatz and Allazim as a reunited family. Indeed, the original ending of Voltaire's play may have been too serious for contemporary tastes and may have been a reason for Mozart's leaving the project incomplete.

== Noted arias ==
Act 1

- "Herr und Freund, wie dank ich dir!" – Gomatz
- "Ruhe sanft, mein holdes Leben" – Zaide
- "Nur mutig, mein Herze" – Allazim
- "O selige Wonne!" – Terzetto (Trio) Zaide, Gomatz, Allazim
- "Rase, Schicksal" – Gomatz

Act 2

- "Der stolze Löw' lässt sich zwar zähmen" – Sultan Soliman
- "Ich bin so bös als gut" – Sultan Soliman
- "Ihr Mächtigen seht ungerührt" – Allazim
- "Tiger! Wetze nur die Klauen" – Zaide
- "Trostlos schluchzet Philomele" – Zaide
- "Wer hungrig bei der Tafel sitzt" – Osmin

== Recordings ==
- 1952 – Mattiwilda Dobbs (Zaide), Hugues Cuénod (Gomatz), Bernard Demigny (Allazim), Joseph Peyron (Sultan Soliman), John Riley (Osmin) – Orchestre Philharmonique De Paris, René Leibowitz – 2 LPs Polymusic
- 1975 – Edith Mathis (Zaide), Peter Schreier (Gomatz), Ingvar Wixell (Allazim), Werner Hollweg (Sultan Soliman), Reiner Süß (Osmin) – Staatskapelle Berlin, Bernhard Klee – 2 CDs Philips Classics
- 1982 – Judith Blegen (Zaide), Werner Hollweg (Gomatz), Wolfgang Schöne (Allazim), Thomas Moser (Sultan Soliman), Robert Holl (Osmin) – Mozarteum Orchester Salzburg, Leopold Hager – 2 CDs Orfeo
- 1998 – Lynne Dawson (Zaide), Hans Peter Blochwitz (Gomatz), Olaf Bär (Allazim), Herbert Lippert (Sultan Soliman), Christopher Purves (Osmin) – Academy of Ancient Music, Paul Goodwin – CD Harmonia Mundi
- 2006 – Isabel Monar (Zaide), Markus Schäfer (Gomatz), Christian Hilz (Allazim), Markus Brutscher (Sultan Soliman) – Wiener Akademie, Martin Haselböck – 2 CDs CPO
- 2006 – Diana Damrau (Zaide), Michael Schade (Gomatz), Florian Boesch (Allazim), Rudolf Schasching (Sultan Soliman), Anton Scharinger (Osmin) – Concentus Musicus Wien, Nikolaus Harnoncourt – 2 CDs Deutsche Harmonia Mundi
- 2016 – Sophie Bevan (Zaide), Allan Clayton (Gomatz), Jacques Imbrailo (Allazim), Stuart Jackson (Sultan Soliman), Darren Jeffery (Osmin), Jonathan McGovern – Classical Opera, Ian Page – CD Signum Classics

== See also ==
- List of operas by Mozart
