= Alonso e Cora =

Opera by Francesco Bianchi

- Opera seria by Francesco Bianchi
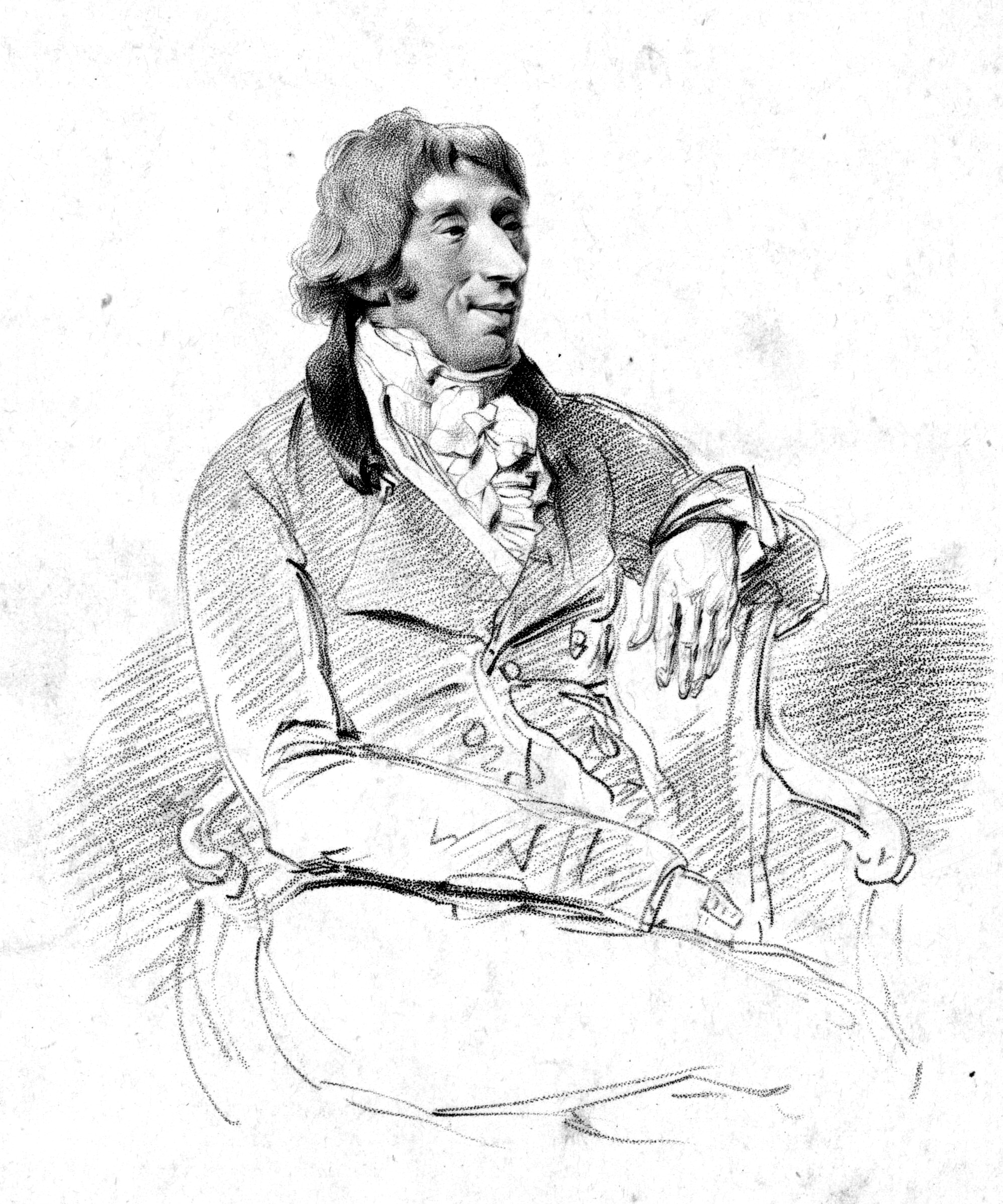
- The composer in 1805
- Librettist: Giuseppe Foppa
- Language: Italian
- Based on: Ferdinando Moretti's Idalide
- Premiere: 7 February 1786; Teatro San Benedetto, Venice

Alonso e Cora (Alonso and Cora) is an opera seria in three acts by Francesco Bianchi. The libretto was by Giuseppe Foppa, after Ferdinando Moretti's Idalide, o sia La vergine del sole, as used by Giuseppe Sarti in Milan in 1783. The original source of this text was in turn Jean François Marmontel's Les Incas, ou La destruction de l'empire du Pérou (1777).

The opera was notable for its spectacular effects which included sea scenes and a volcanic eruption, and its opulent music which involved concertato choruses, ensembles (including one quintet), and a ballet contributing to the grand conclusion in the last act.

Simon Mayr also set a version of the story, under the same title, for Milan in 1803.

== Performance history ==
The opera was first performed at the Teatro San Benedetto in Venice on 7 February 1786.

== Roles ==
Role	Voice type	Premiere Cast, 7 February 1786 (Conductor: Antonio Capuzzi)
Alonso, a conquistador	soprano castrato	Domenico Bedini
Cora, an Inca sun maiden	soprano	Anna Andreozzi-De Santis
Berinto	tenor	Giuseppe Desirò
Ataliba, Inca ruler	tenor	Vincenzo Maffoli
Zamoro	soprano castrato	Domenico Masi
Amazili	soprano	Teresa Benvenuti

== Synopsis ==
A love story set in the new world. Alonso, the Spanish conquistador, rescues Cora, an Inca maiden, when the Temple of the Sun is destroyed by a volcanic eruption, but thereby unwittingly breaks the law that forbids her to leave the temple, on pain of being sacrificed to the gods. Alonso is willing to die with her, but the people take mercy and abolish the ancient law.
