= Yimella radicis =

Scientific classification
- Domain: Bacteria
- Kingdom: Bacillati
- Phylum: Actinomycetota
- Class: Actinomycetes
- Order: Micrococcales
- Family: Dermacoccaceae
- Genus: Yimella
- Species: Y. radicis

Binomial name
- Yimella radicis Yang et al. 2016

Type strain
- KCTC 39612; LMG 29070 py1292

Species of bacterium

Yimella radicis is an endophytic bacterium from the genus Yimella which has been isolated from the roots of the plant Paris polyphylla var. yunnanensis from Zhongdian in China.
