= Luteipulveratus halotolerans =

Scientific classification
- Domain: Bacteria
- Kingdom: Bacillati
- Phylum: Actinomycetota
- Class: Actinomycetes
- Order: Micrococcales
- Family: Dermacoccaceae
- Genus: Luteipulveratus
- Species: L. halotolerans

Binomial name
- Luteipulveratus halotolerans Juboi et al. 2015

Type strain
- ATCC TSD-4; JCM 30660; C296001

Species of bacterium

Luteipulveratus halotolerans is a bacterium from the genus of Luteipulveratus which has been isolated from forest soil from Sarawak in Malaysia.
