= Johann Pfeiffer =

German violinist and composer (1697–1761)

Johann Pfeiffer (1 January 1697 – 1761) was a German violinist, concert master and composer of the late baroque period.

== Life ==
Johann Pfeiffer was born in Nuremberg and had his earliest music lessons with various teachers in his home town. After studying law in Leipzig and Halle he worked for six months in the Hofkapelle of the count Heinrich Reuß-Schleiz. From 1720, he was employed as a violinist in the Hofkapelle (Court Orchestra) in Weimar. In 1726 he became concert master there and Duke Ernst August gifted him a valuable violin made by Jakob Stainer. In the years 1729 and 1730 he accompanied his employer on a trip through Holland, the Habsburg Netherlands and France. In 1732 Pfeiffer spent several in months Berlin, before he became the Hofkapellmeister of Margrave Friedrich III in Bayreuth on the recommendation of the Crown Prince, Friedrich II. In Bayreuth he also gave lessons to Wilhelmine of Prussia in composition, violin playing, and continuo and also joined the Masonic Lodge Zur Sonne.

After the death of Wilhelmine in 1758, the court orchestra was reduced and Pfeiffer was released from his position as concert master, although he remained connected to the court in Bayreuth as a well respected violinist and composer until his death in 1761.

== Works ==
Pfeiffer's compositional style is typical of that which prevailed in South Germany during the first half of the 18th century and also demonstrates a strong Italian influence. His Ouverture-Suites are close in style to those of his German contemporaries like Telemann, Fasch and even Bach. A large part of Pfeiffer's musical output is considered lost. Since most of his surviving manuscripts are signed "del Sign. Pfeiffer", it is likely that many pieces now attributed to him are by other composers named Pfeiffer, including his Son Johann Michael (ca.1750–ca.1800), the probable composer of several sinfonias. Pfeiffer also composed music for the stage, especially for the Margravial Opera House in Bayrteuth which was built at the instigation of Wilhelmine and her husband. It is one of the few German baroque theatres surviving.

The technical requirements made by Pfeiffer's surviving concertos and chamber music vary widely and a clear distinction can be made between the music written for himself or other professional court musicians, and his lesser skilled employers, their entourage and other amateur music lovers. The large number of entries Pfeiffer's works receive in the catalogues Breitkopf & Härtel from the 1760–1780s attests to his popularity during the 18th century. Unfortunately only a very few of the works cited have survived to modern times.

=== Chamber music ===
- Quadro Sonata in G major for flute, oboe, horn and basso continuo
- Sonata in A major for 2 oboes d'amore, 2 violas and basso continuo
- Concerto in G minor for oboe, violin, bassoon and basso continuo
- 2 trio sonatas for oboe, violin and basso continuo (in C minor; B♭ major)
- Sonata in D major for viola da gamba or viola and obligato harpsichord
- Trio sonata in B♭ major for viola d'amore, violin and basso continuo.

=== Orchestral music ===
- Ouverture-Suite in D major for 2 oboes, 2 horns, bassoon, strings and basso continuo
- Ouverture-Suite in D major for 2 oboes, bassoon, strings and basso continuo
- Ouverture-Suite in E minor for 2 oboes, bassoon, strings and basso continuo
- Ouverture-Suite in G minor for oboe or violin concertato, strings and basso continuo
- Ouverture-Suite in G major for 2 oboes, bassoon, strings and basso continuo
- Ouverture-Suite in G major for 2 flutes, bassoon, strings and basso continuo
- Ouverture-Suite in B♭ major for 2 flutes, 2 oboes, bassoon, strings and basso continuo)
- 3 Concertos for violin, strings and basso continuo (in F minor; D major; B♭ major)
- Bassoon concerto in B♭ major
- Concerto for violino piccolo in F major
- 4 Arias for oboe, strings and basso continuo (in B♭ major; G minor; F major; F major)
- Concerto for viola da gamba, two violins and basso continuo in A major

=== Lost works ===
Some of the following works are cited in Breitkopf's catalogues. Any surviving works are listed above.

- 3 sonatas for oboe or violin and obligato harpsichord
- 1 sonata for violin and basso continuo
- 1 trio sonata for violin, viola and basso continuo
- 18 Ouverture-suites (4 listed above)
- 2 flute concertos
- 18 violin concertos (4 listed above)
- 9 concertos for violino piccolo
- 2 sinfonias
- 1 aria for 2 sopranos, bass, bassoon, strings and basso continuo
- 2 trio sonatas for violin, viola da gamba and basso continuo
- 1 trio sonata for oboe, viola da gamba and basso continuo
- 1 concerto for viola da gamba, two violins and basso continuo
