= Demetrias (disambiguation) =

Demetrias (Ancient Greek: Δημητριάς) was an ancient Greek city. Demetrias may also refer to:

- Battle of Demetrias, a 1270s sea battle near the Greek city
- Demetriapolis or Demetrias, an ancient city in Arachosia
- An alternative name for the city of Sicyon in the northern Peloponnesus
- Demetrias in Assyria, an ancient Greek colony in northern Iraq
- Demetrias (beetle), a genus of ground beetle
- Demetrias (daughter of Anicius Hermogenianus Olybrius), Roman noblewoman of the 5th century
- Antigonis and Demetrias, two Ancient Greek tribes
