= TDF =

TDF may refer to:

== Businesses and organisations ==
- TDF Group, a French media and telecommunications conglomerate
- Theatre Development Fund, an American performing arts non-profit
- Templeton Dragon Fund on the New York Stock Exchange
- The Dawood Foundation, a Pakistani non-profit
- Target date fund, a form of mutual fund
- The Document Foundation, an open-source software non-profit

== Military ==
- Tigray Defense Forces, an Ethiopian paramilitary group
- Territorial Defense Forces (Ukraine)

== Music ==
- The Dayton Family, an American horrorcore group
- Totally Dysfunctional Family, known as TDF, the group pseudonym of Eric Clapton and other musicians for a one-off 1997 album
- The Dhol Foundation, a dhol troupe from the UK
- tdf (producer), American music producer from Minneapolis, Minnesota

== Science and technology ==
- Tab delimited files, a tabular data file format
- Télé Distribution Française, a radio clock signal transmitter in France
- TenDRA Distribution Format, a design of abstract machine
- Tenofovir disoproxil fumarate, an antiretroviral drug
- Testis determining factor, a gene (or product thereof) that results in maleness
- The Document Foundation, a non-profit organization that promotes open-source document handling software, particularly LibreOffice
- Tire-derived fuel, recycled chipped tires burned for fuel
- Trusted Data Format, a data tagging and protection standard used both commercially and by the United States Intelligence Community and US Department of Defense

== Other uses ==
- Tour de France, a prestigious cycle race in France
- Thessaloniki Documentary Festival, a documentary film festival affiliated with the International Thessaloniki Film Festival
- Theoretical Domains Framework, an implementation tool for Behavioural change theories
- Total dietary fiber, the indigestible portion of food derived from plants
- Tierra del Fuego, an archipelago off the southernmost tip of the South American mainland

== See also ==
- Tour de Force (disambiguation)
