= Flexivirga endophytica =

Scientific classification
- Domain: Bacteria
- Kingdom: Bacillati
- Phylum: Actinomycetota
- Class: Actinomycetes
- Order: Micrococcales
- Family: Dermacoccaceae
- Genus: Flexivirga
- Species: F. endophytica

Binomial name
- Flexivirga endophytica Gao et al. 2016

Type strain
- CGMCC 1.15085; YIM 7505; KCTC 39536; YIM 7505

Species of bacterium

Flexivirga endophytica is an endophytic, Gram-positive, aerobic and non-motile bacterium from the genus Flexivirga which has been isolated from a leaf of the plant Ocimum basilicum.
