= Calidifontibacter indicus =

Scientific classification
- Domain: Bacteria
- Kingdom: Bacillati
- Phylum: Actinomycetota
- Class: Actinomycetes
- Order: Micrococcales
- Family: Dermacoccaceae
- Genus: Calidifontibacter
- Species: C. indicus

Binomial name
- Calidifontibacter indicus Ruckmani et al. 2011

Type strain
- DSM 22967; JCM 16038; MTCC 8338; PC IW02

Species of bacterium

Calidifontibacter indicus is a Gram-positive and non-motile bacterium from the genus of Calidifontibacter which has been isolated from spring water from the Western Ghats in India.
