= Dermacoccus abyssi =

Scientific classification
- Domain: Bacteria
- Kingdom: Bacillati
- Phylum: Actinomycetota
- Class: Actinomycetes
- Order: Micrococcales
- Family: Dermacoccaceae
- Genus: Dermacoccus
- Species: D. abyssi

Binomial name
- Dermacoccus abyssi Pathom-aree et al. 2006

Type strain
- CIP 109302; DSM 17573; JCM 14339; MT1.1; NCIMB 14084

Species of bacterium

Dermacoccus abyssi is a piezotolerant bacterium from the genus of Dermacoccus which has been isolated from sediments from the Mariana Trench.
