= Flexivirga caeni =

Scientific classification
- Domain: Bacteria
- Kingdom: Bacillati
- Phylum: Actinomycetota
- Class: Actinomycetes
- Order: Micrococcales
- Family: Dermacoccaceae
- Genus: Flexivirga
- Species: F. caeni

Binomial name
- Flexivirga caeni Keum et al. 2020

Type strain
- BO-16; KACC 19647; LMG 30859

Species of bacterium

Flexivirga caeni is a Gram-positive, strictly aerobic, non-spore-forming and non-motile bacterium from the genus Flexivirga which has been isolated from activated sludge.
