= Flexivirga alba =

Scientific classification
- Domain: Bacteria
- Kingdom: Bacillati
- Phylum: Actinomycetota
- Class: Actinomycetes
- Order: Micrococcales
- Family: Dermacoccaceae
- Genus: Flexivirga
- Species: F. alba

Binomial name
- Flexivirga alba Anzai et al. 2012

Type strain
- DSM 24460; NBRC 107580; ST13

Species of bacterium

Flexivirga alba is a non-spore-forming bacterium from the genus of Flexivirga which has been isolated from soil near a wastewater treatment plant in Seki in Japan.
