= Barrientosiimonas endolithica =

Scientific classification
- Domain: Bacteria
- Kingdom: Bacillati
- Phylum: Actinomycetota
- Class: Actinomycetes
- Order: Micrococcales
- Family: Dermacoccaceae
- Genus: Barrientosiimonas
- Species: B. endolithica

Binomial name
- Barrientosiimonas endolithica Parag et al. 2015

Type strain
- KCTC 29672; NBRC 110608; JC268

Species of bacterium

Barrientosiimonas endolithica is a Gram-positive, non-spore-forming, obligately aerobic and non-motile bacterium from the genus Barrientosiimonas which has been isolated from pebbles from Lalitpur in India.
