= Flexivirga lutea =

Scientific classification
- Domain: Bacteria
- Kingdom: Bacillati
- Phylum: Actinomycetota
- Class: Actinomycetes
- Order: Micrococcales
- Family: Dermacoccaceae
- Genus: Flexivirga
- Species: F. lutea

Binomial name
- Flexivirga lutea Kang et al. 2016

Type strain
- JCM 31200; KCTC 39625; TBS-100

Species of bacterium

Flexivirga lutea is a Gram-positive, aerobic and non-motile bacterium from the genus Flexivirga which has been isolated from feces of the bird Crested ibis.
