= Barrientosiimonas humi =

Scientific classification
- Domain: Bacteria
- Kingdom: Bacillati
- Phylum: Actinomycetota
- Class: Actinomycetes
- Order: Micrococcales
- Family: Dermacoccaceae
- Genus: Barrientosiimonas
- Species: B. humi

Binomial name
- Barrientosiimonas humi Lee et al. 2013

Type strain
- 39; CGMCC 4.6864; DSM 24617

Species of bacterium

Barrientosiimonas humi is a bacterium from the genus Barrientosiimonas which has been isolated from soil from the Barrientos Island in the Antarctica.
