= Yimella lutea =

Scientific classification
- Domain: Bacteria
- Kingdom: Bacillati
- Phylum: Actinomycetota
- Class: Actinomycetes
- Order: Micrococcales
- Family: Dermacoccaceae
- Genus: Yimella
- Species: Y. lutea

Binomial name
- Yimella lutea Tang et al. 2010

Type strain
- CCTCC AB 207007; DSM 19828; JCM 16960; KCTC 19231; YIM 45900

Species of bacterium

Yimella lutea is a Gram-positive, halotolerant and non-motile bacterium from the genus Yimella which has been isolated from a contaminated agar plate from the Yunnan Institute of Microbiology in China.
