= Barrientosiimonas marina =

Scientific classification
- Domain: Bacteria
- Kingdom: Bacillati
- Phylum: Actinomycetota
- Class: Actinomycetes
- Order: Micrococcales
- Family: Dermacoccaceae
- Genus: Barrientosiimonas
- Species: B. marina

Binomial name
- Barrientosiimonas marina (Lee 2013) Parag et al. 2015

Type strain
- DSM 21415; MSW-24; KCTC 19485

Synonyms
- Tamlicoccus marinus Lee 2013

Species of bacterium

Barrientosiimonas marina is a Gram-positive, non-spore-forming, aerobic and non-motile bacterium from the genus Barrientosiimonas which has been isolated from seawater from the Mara Island in Korea.
