= Branchiibius cervicis =

Scientific classification
- Domain: Bacteria
- Kingdom: Bacillati
- Phylum: Actinomycetota
- Class: Actinomycetes
- Order: Micrococcales
- Family: Dermacoccaceae
- Genus: Branchiibius
- Species: B. cervicis

Binomial name
- Branchiibius cervicis Tomida et al. 2013

Type strain
- DSM 24166; NBRC 106593; PAGU 1247

Species of bacterium

Branchiibius cervicis is a bacterium in the genus of Branchiibius which has been isolated from the skin of patients with atopic dermatitis from Saitama in Japan.
