= Flexivirga oryzae =

Scientific classification
- Domain: Bacteria
- Kingdom: Bacillati
- Phylum: Actinomycetota
- Class: Actinomycetes
- Order: Micrococcales
- Family: Dermacoccaceae
- Genus: Flexivirga
- Species: F. oryzae

Binomial name
- Flexivirga oryzae Hyeon et al. 2017

Type strain
- JCM 31060; KACC 18597; R1

Species of bacterium

Flexivirga oryzae is a Gram-positive, strictly aerobic and non-motile bacterium from the genus Flexivirga which has been isolated from soil from a rice field from Korea.
