= Lucrezia Aguiari =

Italian operatic singer

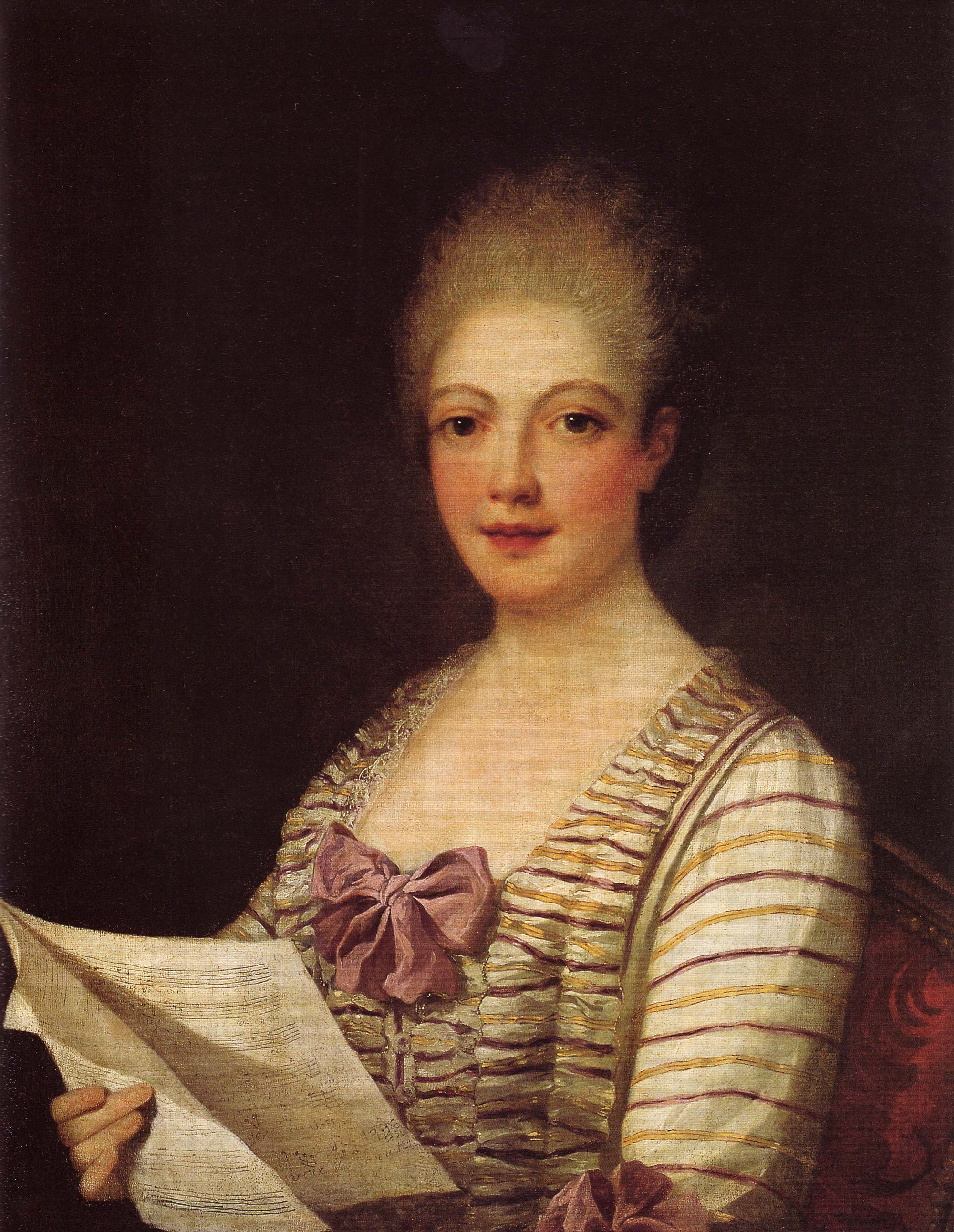
Lucrezia Agujari (La Bastardella), attributed to Pietro Melchiorre Ferrari.

Lucrezia Aguiari (sometimes spelled Agujari) (1743/46 in Ferrara – 18 May 1783 in Parma) was an Italian coloratura soprano. She possessed an unusually agile voice with a large vocal range that spanned slightly more than three and a half octaves, faculties that enabled her to perform the most difficult passage work. In a letter dated 24 March 1770 Mozart wrote of hearing her perform a C an octave above high C at the Ducal opera of Parma, "I could not believe that she was able to reach C soprano acuto, but my ears convinced me." Aldous Huxley mentioned this event in his novel Brave New World (with her name misspelled as "Ajugari").

== Biography ==
Born in Ferrara, Aguiari was often referred to during her lifetime as "La Bastardina" or "La Bastardella". There are several different traditions explaining the origin of this nickname, one being that she was the illegitimate child of one Leopoldo Aguiari or that of his wife with a Marchese Bentivoglio. Another possible explanation was that she was an abandoned child raised by Aguiari. A curiosity associated with her was a pronounced limp that was reportedly the result of a dog or hog eating part of her leg while she was an infant.

Aguiari studied music with the composer Brizio Petrucci in Ferrara and was further educated at a convent in Florence, where she received singing lessons from Abbé Lambertini. Her first recorded operatic appearances took place in her native Ferrara during the carnival operatic season of 1765, specifically in a work by her teacher Petrucci (a setting of Metastasio's libretto Demofoonte) and Johann Adolph Hasse's opera Artaserse. Later in 1765, she made appearances in opera houses in Padua, Verona and Lucca, with further appearances in Mantua, Lucca and Ferrara in 1766.

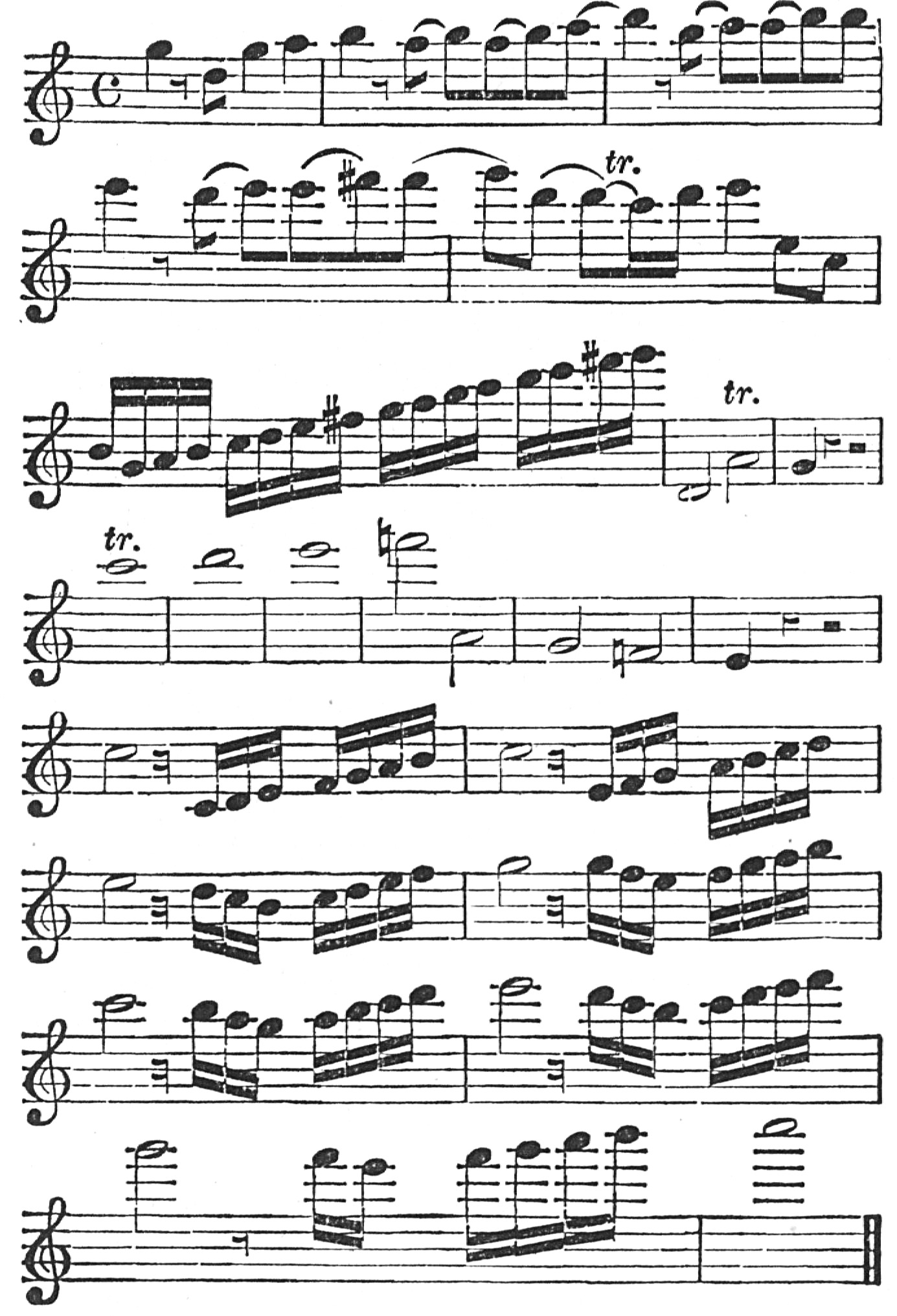
Transcription by Mozart in letter of 24 March 1770 of coloratura by Agujari

Aguiari's professional status was markedly enhanced beginning in the carnival operatic season of 1767, when she appeared for the first time at the Ducal Theater in Parma, where she became a court singer for the local ruler, Ferdinand I, Duke of Parma. Her service at the court of Parma is asserted in librettos until 1780, when she appeared in Francesco Bianchi's opera Demetrio in Venice. Aguiari appeared in many operatic roles outside of Parma during this time. In 1768, she was able to appear for the first time at the prestigious Teatro San Carlo in Naples, where she sang the title role at the world premiere of Paisiello's Le nozze di Peleo e Tetide on the occasion of the wedding ceremony of King Ferdinand IV of Naples and the Archduchess Maria Carolina of Austria. She was also able to savor great successes in Milan, Paris, Turin, and London.

In 1773, Aguiari was engaged to sing in Pavia for the opening of a new theater that featured a performance of Josef Mysliveček's opera Demetrio. In the role of Cleonice, she sang the aria "Agitata in tanti affanni," a virtuoso display piece frequently disseminated in 18th-century music manuscripts that highlighted her renowned ability to sing with great dexterity in a very high tessitura. Even though Aguiari and Mysliveček were close professional associates for the purpose of this production, there is no documentation to support reports that they were ever involved romantically, in spite of many reports that appear in the musicological literature. No mention of a love affair with Mysliveček pre-dates the publication of the fifth edition of the Grove Dictionary of Music and Musicians (1954).

In 1780, Aguiari married the composer Giuseppe Colla (1731–1806). Colla, a native of Parma, would have met Aguiari at the time of her appearance in his opera Tigrane, which was given in Parma during the carnival operatic season of 1765, shortly after she first arrived there. Aguiari is known to have appeared in seven further productions of operas by Colla during the course of her career, more than by any other composer. She left the stage after the close of the summer opera season at Genoa in 1782 due to ill health. Although it was rumoured that she was poisoned by a jealous rival, she actually died of tuberculosis in 1783 at the age of 40.

== Operatic roles ==
- Mandane in Artaserse by Johann Adolph Hasse (Ferrara, 1765)
- Dircea in Il Demofoonte by Brizio Petrucci (Ferrara, 1765; Ferrara 1766)
- Fulvia in Ezio by Tommaso Traetta (Padua, 1765)
- Berenice in Antigono by Giuseppe Sarti (Verona, 1765)
- Dircea in the pasticcio Demofoonte (Lucca, 1765)
- Beroe in La Nitteti by Brizio Petrucci (Mantua, 1766)
- Cleofide in the pasticcio Alessandro nell'Indie (Lucca, 1766)
- Ipermestra in the anonymous Ipermestra (Parma, 1767)
- Cleopatra in Tigrane by Giuseppe Colla (Parma, 1767)
- Tetide in Le nozze di Peleo e Tetide by Giovanni Paisiello (Naples, 1768)
- Arcinia and Bauci in Le feste d'Apollo by Christoph Willibald Gluck (Parma, 1769)
- Berenice in Vologeso by Giuseppe Colla (Venice, 1770)
- Elisa in the anonymous Il re pastore (Genoa, 1771)
- Lisinga in L'eroe cinese by Giuseppe Colla (Genoa, 1771)
- Andromeda in Andromeda by Giuseppe Colla (Turin, 1772)
- Zama in Tamas Kouli-Kan nell'Indie by Gaetano Pugnani (Turin, 1772)
- Argea in Argea by Felice Alessandri (Turin, 1773)
- Didone in Didone by Giuseppe Colla (Turin, 1773)
- Cleonice in Demetrio by Josef Mysliveček (Pavia, 1773)
- Andromeda in Andromeda by Giovanni Paisiello (Milan, 1774)
- Cleopatra in Tolomeo by Giuesppe Colla (Milan, 1774)
- Zulima in Sicotencal by Giuseppe Colla (Pavia, 1776)
- Unknown role in an unknown work in the Pantheon, London (1777)
- Andromeda in Andromeda by Giuseppe Colla (Florence, 1778)
- Didone in the pasticcio Didone abbandonata (Florence, 1778)
- Emirena in Adriano in Sira by Felice Alessandri (Venice, 1780)
- Cleonice in Demetrio by Francesco Bianchi (Venice, 1780)
- Tullia in Giunio Bruto by Domenico Cimarosa (Genoa, 1782)
- Cleopatra in the anonymous Tigrane (Genoa, 1782)

Source: Corago Singers project, Lucrezia Aguiari (listed as Agujari Colla, Lucrezia detta la Bastardella)
