= Luteipulveratus mongoliensis =

Scientific classification
- Domain: Bacteria
- Kingdom: Bacillati
- Phylum: Actinomycetota
- Class: Actinomycetes
- Order: Micrococcales
- Family: Dermacoccaceae
- Genus: Luteipulveratus
- Species: L. mongoliensis

Binomial name
- Luteipulveratus mongoliensis Ara et al. 2010

Type strain
- NBRC 105296; VTCC D9-09; MN07-A0370

Species of bacterium

Luteipulveratus mongoliensis is a bacterium from the genus of Luteipulveratus which has been isolated from soil from the Mongolia.
