= Branchiibius hedensis =

Scientific classification
- Domain: Bacteria
- Kingdom: Bacillati
- Phylum: Actinomycetota
- Class: Actinomycetes
- Order: Micrococcales
- Family: Dermacoccaceae
- Genus: Branchiibius
- Species: B. hedensis

Binomial name
- Branchiibius hedensis Sugimoto et al. 2011

Type strain
- DSM 22951; Mer 29717; NBRC 106121

Species of bacterium

Branchiibius hedensis is a Gram-positive bacterium in the genus Branchiibius which has been isolated from the morid cod Physiculus japonicus from the Suruga Bay in Japan.
