= Calidifontibacter terrae =

Scientific classification
- Domain: Bacteria
- Kingdom: Bacillati
- Phylum: Actinomycetota
- Class: Actinomycetes
- Order: Micrococcales
- Family: Dermacoccaceae
- Genus: Calidifontibacter
- Species: C. terrae

Binomial name
- Calidifontibacter terrae Dahal et al. 2017

Type strain
- JCM 31558; KACC 18906; KEMB 9005-404; R161

Species of bacterium

Calidifontibacter terrae is a Gram-positive, non-spore-forming, aerobic and non-motile bacterium from the genus Calidifontibacter which has been isolated from soil from Hwaseong in Korea.
