= Jane Bianchi =

British soprano singer (1776–1858)

Jane Bianchi Lacy
- Born: Jane Jackson; 1776
- Died: 19 March 1858 (aged 81–82); Ealing
- Occupations: soprano singer, pianist, painter
- Spouse(s): Francesco Bianchi, William Lacy
- Children: at least one

Jane Jackson became Jane Bianchi and later Jane Bianchi Lacy (1776 – 19 March 1858) was a British soprano singer in London and Oudh, India. She was also a good pianist, painter and linguist.

== Life ==
Bianchi was born as Jane Jackson, the daughter of a London apothecary named John Jackson.

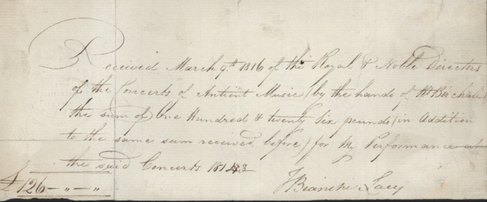
Payment for singing in 1813 at the Concerts of Antient Music. £126 to J. Bianchi Lacy

In 1800 she married the Italian composer Francesco Bianchi. She became known as the leading singer of Handel's music and she was often invited to Windsor Castle where she entertained George III and Queen Charlotte. She composed a song for voice and piano on a poem by Peter Pindar entitled Helen, published possibly in 1805 and published again, possibly in 1812. On 12 March 1806, the Austrian composer Joseph Woelfl published "Six English Songs" which he dedicated to Bianchi.

She and Francesco had a daughter who died aged five in June 1807. In November 1810, her husband took his own life. He and their daughter were buried in the old Kensington Church, now St Mary Abbots, Kensington.

Bianchi married again to another singer named William Lacy. Her English husband had trained in Italy and was a bass singer.

In 1813 she again sang at the Concerts of Antient Music where she was paid £126 (see illustration). She had sung at that concert in 1800 when she was "Miss Jackson". At somewhere around this time she published a song, "Winter's beautiful Rose", which she had composed to accompany words by Amelia Opie. She dedicated the work to the Viscountesses Hampden.

They left England and sailed for Calcutta in 1818 where they stayed for seven years performing at the court of Oudh. At the time the King of Oudh was Saadat Ali Khan II.

Whilst she was away she published an unseen work by her first husband in 1820/1821.

Bianchi died in Ealing in 1858. Her second husband survived her.
