= Luteipulveratus =

Scientific classification
- Domain: Bacteria
- Kingdom: Bacillati
- Phylum: Actinomycetota
- Class: Actinomycetes
- Order: Micrococcales
- Family: Dermacoccaceae
- Genus: Luteipulveratus; Ara et al. 2010

Type species
- Luteipulveratus mongoliensis Ara et al. 2010

Species
- L. halotolerans Juboi et al. 2015; L. mongoliensis Ara et al. 2010

Genus of bacteria

Luteipulveratus is a genus of bacteria from the family Dermacoccaceae.
