= Barrientosiimonas =

Scientific classification
- Domain: Bacteria
- Kingdom: Bacillati
- Phylum: Actinomycetota
- Class: Actinomycetes
- Order: Micrococcales
- Family: Dermacoccaceae
- Genus: Barrientosiimonas; Lee et al. 2013

Type species
- Barrientosiimonas humi Lee et al. 2013

Species
- B. endolithica Parag et al. 2015; B. humi Lee et al. 2013; B. marina (Lee 2013) Parag et al. 2015

Synonyms
- Tamlicoccus Lee 2013

Genus of bacteria

Barrientosiimonas is a genus of bacteria from the family Dermacoccaceae.
