= Dermacoccus =

Scientific classification
- Domain: Bacteria
- Kingdom: Bacillati
- Phylum: Actinomycetota
- Class: Actinomycetes
- Order: Micrococcales
- Family: Dermacoccaceae
- Genus: Dermacoccus; Stackebrandt et al. 1995

Type species
- Dermacoccus nishinomiyaensis (Oda 1935) Stackebrandt et al. 1995

Species
- D. abyssi Pathom-aree et al. 2006; D. barathri Pathom-aree et al. 2006; D. nishinomiyaensis (Oda 1935) Stackebrandt et al. 1995; D. profundi Pathom-aree et al. 2006

Genus of bacteria

Dermacoccus is a Gram-positive, non-spore-forming, chemoorganotrophic and aerobic genus of bacteria from the family Dermacoccaceae.
