= Allobranchiibius huperziae =

Scientific classification
- Domain: Bacteria
- Kingdom: Bacillati
- Phylum: Actinomycetota
- Class: Actinomycetes
- Order: Micrococcales
- Family: Dermacoccaceae
- Genus: Allobranchiibius; Ai et al. 2017
- Species: A. huperziae

Binomial name
- Allobranchiibius huperziae Ai et al. 2017

Type strain
- CPCC 204077; DSM 29531; NBRC 110719

Genus of bacteria

Allobranchiibius huperziae is a Gram-positive and non-spore-forming species of bacteria from the family of Dermacoccaceae that has been isolated from the roots of the plant Huperzia serrata from Sichuan in China.
