= Seleuco, re di Siria =

- Opera seria by Francesco Bianchi
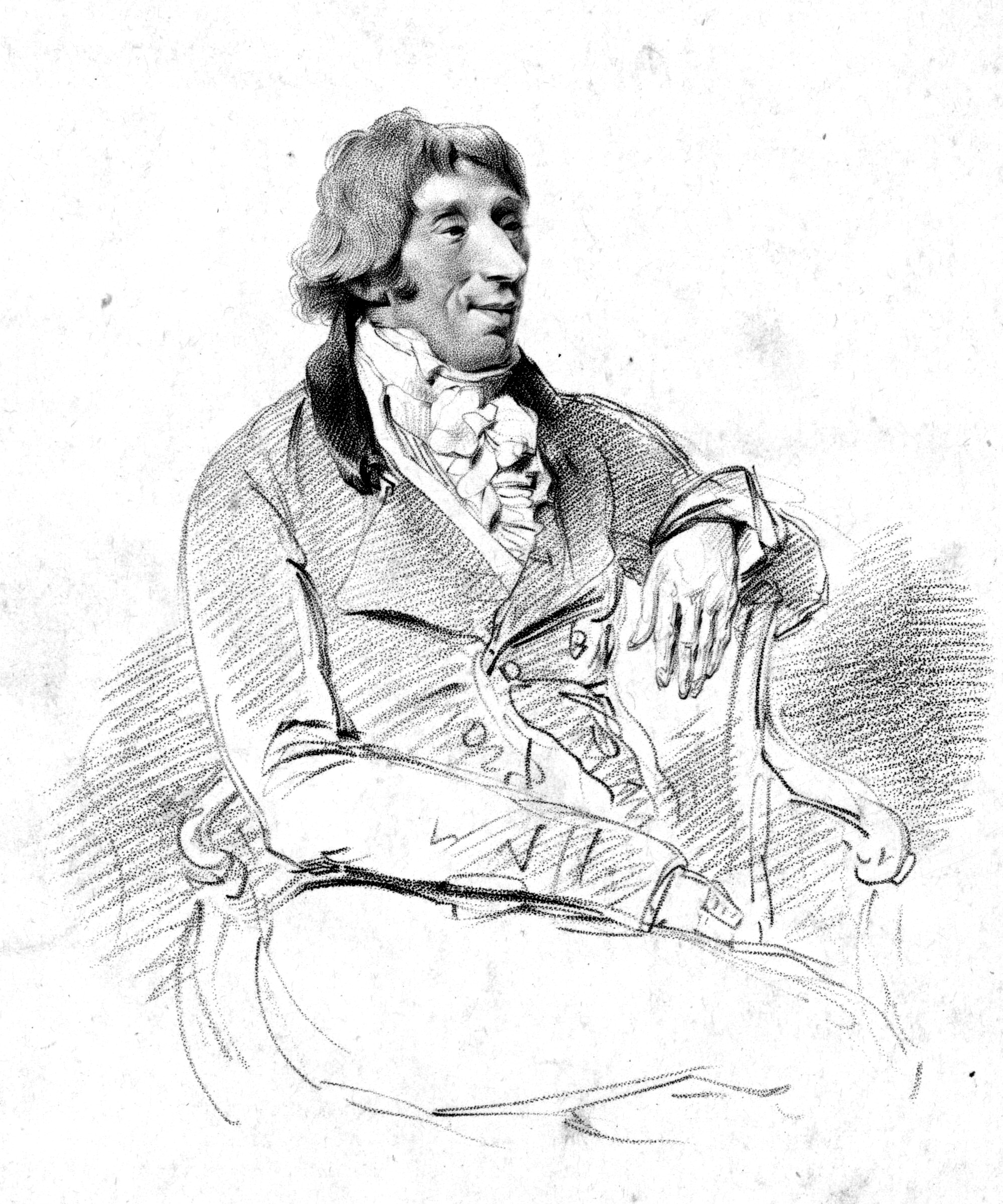
- The composer in 1805
- Librettist: Mattia Botturini
- Language: Italian
- Based on: Antioco by Apostolo Zeno and Pietro Pariati
- Premiere: 26 December 1791; Teatro San Benedetto, Venice

Seleuco, re di Siria (Seleucus, King of Syria) is an opera seria in three acts by Francesco Bianchi. The libretto was by Mattia Botturini, after Antioco by Apostolo Zeno and Pietro Pariati, a libretto first set by Francesco Gasparini in 1705.

Marita P. McClymonds notes that the work "is significant for its several ensembles (one incorporating chorus and dance), its choruses (sometimes functioning as a 'character' in the drama) and its multi-sectional, action-ensemble finale."

== Performance history ==
The opera was first performed at the Teatro San Benedetto in Venice on 26 December 1791.

== Roles ==
Role	Voice type	Premiere Cast, 26 December 1791 (Conductor: Antonio Capuzzi)
Seleuco (Seleucus), King of Syria	tenor	Giacomo David / Giuseppe Simoni
Antioco (Antiochus), Seleuco's son, in love with Stratonica	soprano castrato	Vitale Damiani / Paolo Belli
Stratonica (Stratonice), betrothed to Seleuco, in love with Antioco	soprano	Maria Marchetti Fantozzi / Cecilia Bolognese
Argene	soprano	Teresa Giurini / Anna Schiroli
Tolomeo	tenor	Francesco Gafforini / Antonio Pozzi
Nearco	bass	Filippo Boccucci

== Synopsis ==
Antioco agonizes between his loyalty to his father, Seleuco, and his love for his father's young bride Stratonice. Eventually the generosity of Seleuco resolves everything.
