= San Demetrio =

San Demetrio may refer to:

- San Demetrio Corone, town and municipality in the Calabria region of Italy
- San Demetrio ne' Vestini, commune and town in the Province of L'Aquila in the Abruzzo region of Italy
- San Demetrio London, a 1943 British World War II docudrama
- MV San Demetrio, British motor tanker

== See also ==
- Demetrio (disambiguation)
