= Concertato =

Concertato (Italian: [kontʃerˈtaːto], lit. 'concerted') may refer to:

- Stile concertato, a style of early Baroque music
- Finale concertato, a type of finale of penultimate acts in operas
