= Yimella =

Scientific classification
- Domain: Bacteria
- Kingdom: Bacillati
- Phylum: Actinomycetota
- Class: Actinomycetes
- Order: Micrococcales
- Family: Dermacoccaceae
- Genus: Yimella; Tang et al. 2010

Type species
- Yimella lutea Tang et al. 2010

Species
- Y. lutea Tang et al. 2010; Y. radicis Yang et al. 2016

Genus of bacteria

Yimella is a genus of bacteria from the family Dermacoccaceae.
