= Flexivirga =

Scientific classification
- Domain: Bacteria
- Kingdom: Bacillati
- Phylum: Actinomycetota
- Class: Actinomycetes
- Order: Micrococcales
- Family: Dermacoccaceae
- Genus: Flexivirga; Anzai et al. 2012

Type species
- Flexivirga alba Anzai et al. 2012

Species
- F. aerilata Chaudhary et al. 2021; F. alba Anzai et al. 2012; F. caeni Keum et al. 2020; F. endophytica Gao et al. 2016; F. lutea Kang et al. 2016; F. oryzae Hyeon et al. 2017

Genus of bacteria

Flexivirga is a genus of bacteria from the family Dermacoccaceae.
