= Calidifontibacter =

Scientific classification
- Domain: Bacteria
- Kingdom: Bacillati
- Phylum: Actinomycetota
- Class: Actinomycetes
- Order: Micrococcales
- Family: Dermacoccaceae
- Genus: Calidifontibacter; Ruckmani et al. 2011

Type species
- Calidifontibacter indicus Ruckmani et al. 2011

Species
- C. indicus Ruckmani et al. 2011; C. terrae Dahal et al. 2017

Genus of bacteria

Calidifontibacter is a genus of bacteria from the family Dermacoccaceae.
