= Branchiibius =

Scientific classification
- Domain: Bacteria
- Kingdom: Bacillati
- Phylum: Actinomycetota
- Class: Actinomycetes
- Order: Micrococcales
- Family: Dermacoccaceae
- Genus: Branchiibius; Sugimoto et al. 2011

Type species
- Branchiibius hedensis Sugimoto et al. 2011

Species
- B. cervicis Tomida et al. 2013; B. hedensis Sugimoto et al. 2011

Genus of bacteria

Branchiibius is a genus of bacteria in the family Dermacoccaceae.
