= Rudaeicoccus suwonensis =

Scientific classification
- Domain: Bacteria
- Kingdom: Bacillati
- Phylum: Actinomycetota
- Class: Actinomycetes
- Order: Micrococcales
- Family: Dermacoccaceae
- Genus: Rudaeicoccus; Kim et al. 2013
- Species: R. suwonensis

Binomial name
- Rudaeicoccus suwonensis Kim et al. 2013

Type strain
- DSM 19560; HOR6-4; KACC 12637

Genus of bacteria

Rudaeicoccus suwonensis is a Gram-positive species of bacteria from the family of Dermacoccaceae has been isolated from the roots of a Phalaenopsis orchid.
