= Giuseppe Colla =

Italian composer (1731–1806)

Giuseppe Colla (August 4, 1731 – March 16, 1806) was an Italian composer and opera director. Best known as an opera composer, he was director of the Teatro Regio Ducale in Parma from 1780 through 1806.

== Life and career ==
Giuseppe Colla was born in Parma, Italy. After training a musician in his native city, he went to Mannheim, Germany, where he began his career as an opera composer by contributing six arias to the opera Caio Fabrizio (Mannheim, autumn 1760), whose primary musical author was Niccolò Jommelli. Following the success of this work, he was given a commission to write an opera on his own for the Teatro Regio Ducale in Milan. The result was his Adriano in Siria, first performed in Milan during the carnival operatic season of 1763, then later revived in Pavia in 1771. He also taught harpsichord to Ferdinand I, Duke of Parma, in the early 1760s.

Colla was appointed maestro di cappella at the court of Parma in January 1766, and his opera Tigrane was staged at the Teatro Regio Ducale there for the carnival season of 1767. He was later appointed director at that theater in 1780, a post he held until his death in Parma on March 16, 1806. He had a longstanding romantic relationship with the soprano Lucrezia Aguiari, who sang in Colla's Tigrane as her first appearance at a major opera house in Europe. The couple married at last in 1780 shortly before Aguiari's death.

Nine operas written entirely by Colla are recorded, all of them preserved among the musical scores in the library of the Palace of Ajuda in Lisbon as part of the efforts of King Joseph I of Portugal to assemble a comprehensive collection of all the works performed during his reign at the principal opera theaters of Italy. Lucrezia Aguiari appeared in all but two of Colla's operas (the exceptions being Adriano in Siria of 1763 and Enea in Cartagine of 1770). Colla also wrote sacred music, such as the oratorio Ester, and a large array of cantatas, sinfonias, and secular arias and duets.

== Operas ==
(all serious operas, i.e., opere serie or drammi per musica)

- Adriano in Siria (Milan, Regio Ducal Teatro, carnival 1763; Pavia, Teatro Omodeo, carnival 1771)
- Tigrane (Parma, Teatro Regio Ducale, carnival 1767)
- Enea in Cartagine (Turin, Teatro Regio, carnival 1770)
- Vologeso (Venice, Teatro San Benedetto, May 1770)
- L'eroe cinese (Genoa, Teatro Sant'Agostino, summer 1771)
- Tolomeo (Milan, Regio Ducal Teatro, carnival 1774)
- Andromeda (Turin, Teatro Regio, carnival 1772; Florence, Teatro della Pergola, autumn 1778)
- Didone (Turin, Teatro Regio, carnival 1773)
- Sicotencal (Pavia, Teatro dei Quattro Cavalieri Associati, spring 1776)

Source: Corago.unibo.it/Eventi (for Giuseppe Colla)
