= Demetrio (1773) =

Opera by Josef Mysliveček (1773)

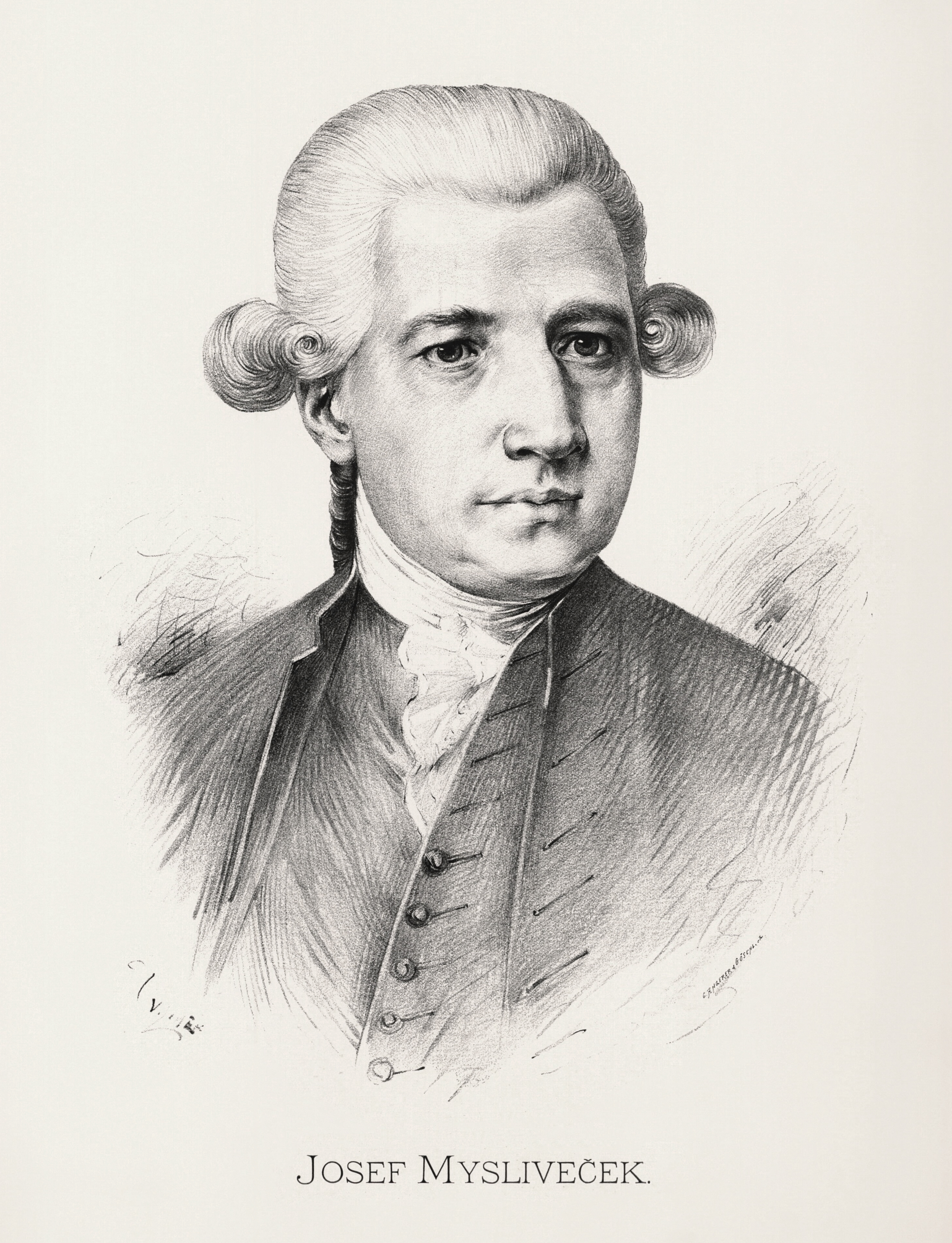
Josef Mysliveček

Demetrio is an eighteenth-century Italian opera in 3 acts by the Czech composer Josef Mysliveček. It was the composer's first setting of a libretto by the Italian poet Metastasio that was first performed in 1731, one of the most popular of the Metastasian librettos in Mysliveček's day. His second setting of the same text was performed in 1779. For a performance in the 1770s, it would only be expected that a libretto of such age would be abbreviated and altered to suit contemporary operatic taste. The cuts and changes in the text made for the 1773 performance of Mysliveček's opera are not attributable. All of Mysliveček's operas are of the serious type in Italian language referred to as opera seria and would usually feature the designation dramma per musica in librettos. Demetrio is the last of a first period of operatic writing marked by the dominance of extended dal segno arias (an altered version of the early 18th-century da capo arias). His later operas were dominated by arias based in some way on sonata form structures.

== Performance history ==
The opera was first performed at the Teatro Nuovo in Pavia on 24 May 1773. It was commissioned to serve as the first opera to be played in a newly constructed theater in the city, and it was considered to be a great honor for Mysliveček to compose the inaugural opera. The organizers were able to attract only one distinguished singer for the cast, however: the soprano Lucrezia Aguiari, whose name has been linked romantically to Mysliveček erroneously in earlier musicological literature. Her aria "Agitata in tanti affanni" was widely disseminated in late eighteenth-century aria collections. It was famed as a tour-de-force for sopranos due to the very high tessitura demanded in some of its passagework.

== Roles ==
Role	Voice type	Premiere cast, 24 May 1773, Teatro Nuovo, Pavia
Cleonice, queen of Syria, in love with Alceste	soprano	Lucrezia Aguiari
Alceste, later revealed to be Demetrio, king of Syria	soprano castrato	Giovanni Rubinelli
Fenicio, grandee of the realm, tutor of Alceste, and father of Olinto	tenor	Giuseppe Afferri
Olinto, grandee of the realm and rival of Alceste	soprano castrato	Giuseppe Benedetti
Barsene, confidante of Cleonice and secretly in love with Alceste	soprano	Anna Benvenuti
Mitrane, captain of the guards and friend of Fenicio	soprano	Rosa Polidoro (in a breeches role)

== Vocal set pieces ==
Act I, scene 1 - Aria of Olinto, "Di quell'ingiusto sdegno"
Act I, scene 2 - Aria of Cleonice, "Fra tanti pensieri"
Act I, scene 3 - Aria of Barsene, "Non ti lagnar del fato"
Act I, scene 4 - Aria of Fenicio, "Ogni procella infida"
Act I, scene 5 - Aria of Cleonice, "Se non posso su quel trono" [a non-Metastasian text]
Act I, scene 6 - Aria of Fenicio, "Il ciel rispetta il soglio"
Act I, scene 7 - Aria of Alceste, "Scherza il nocchier talora"
Act I, scene 9 - Duet for Cleonice and Alceste, "D'un amoroso accento" [a non-Metastasian text]

Act II, scene 2 - Aria of Alceste, "Dal suo gentil sembiante" [a non-Metastasian text]
Act II, scene 3 - Aria of Mitrane, "Dice che t'è fedele"
Act II, scene 4 - Aria of Cleonice, "Nacqui agli affanni in seno"
Act II, scene 5 - Aria of Fenicio, "Alme incaute che torbide ancora"
Act II, scene 6 - Aria of Barsene, "So che per gioco"
Act II, scene 7 - Aria of Olinto, "Non fidi al mar che freme"
Act II, scene 9 - Aria of Alceste, "Non so frenare il pianto"
Act II, scene 11 - Aria of Cleonice, "Agitata in tanti affanni" [a non-Metastasian text]

Act III, scene 1 - Aria of Cleonice, "Io so qual pena sia"
Act III, scene 2 - Aria of Alceste, "Quel labbro adorato"
Act III, scene 3 - Aria of Olinto, "Mi chi m'oltraggia" [a non-Metastasian text]
Act III, scene 4 - Aria of Fenicio, "Giusti Dei da voi non chiede"
Act III, scene 5 - Aria of Barsene, "Semplicetta tortorella"
Act III, scene 6 - Chorus, "Quando scende in nobil petto"

== Recordings ==
- The overture to Mysliveček's Demetrio of 1773 is included in a collection of symphonies and overtures by the composer recorded by the L'Orfeo Barockorchester, Michi Gaigg, conductor, CPO 777-050 (2004).

== See also ==
- Demetrio, 1779 version
