= Arbace =

- Opera seria by Francesco Bianchi
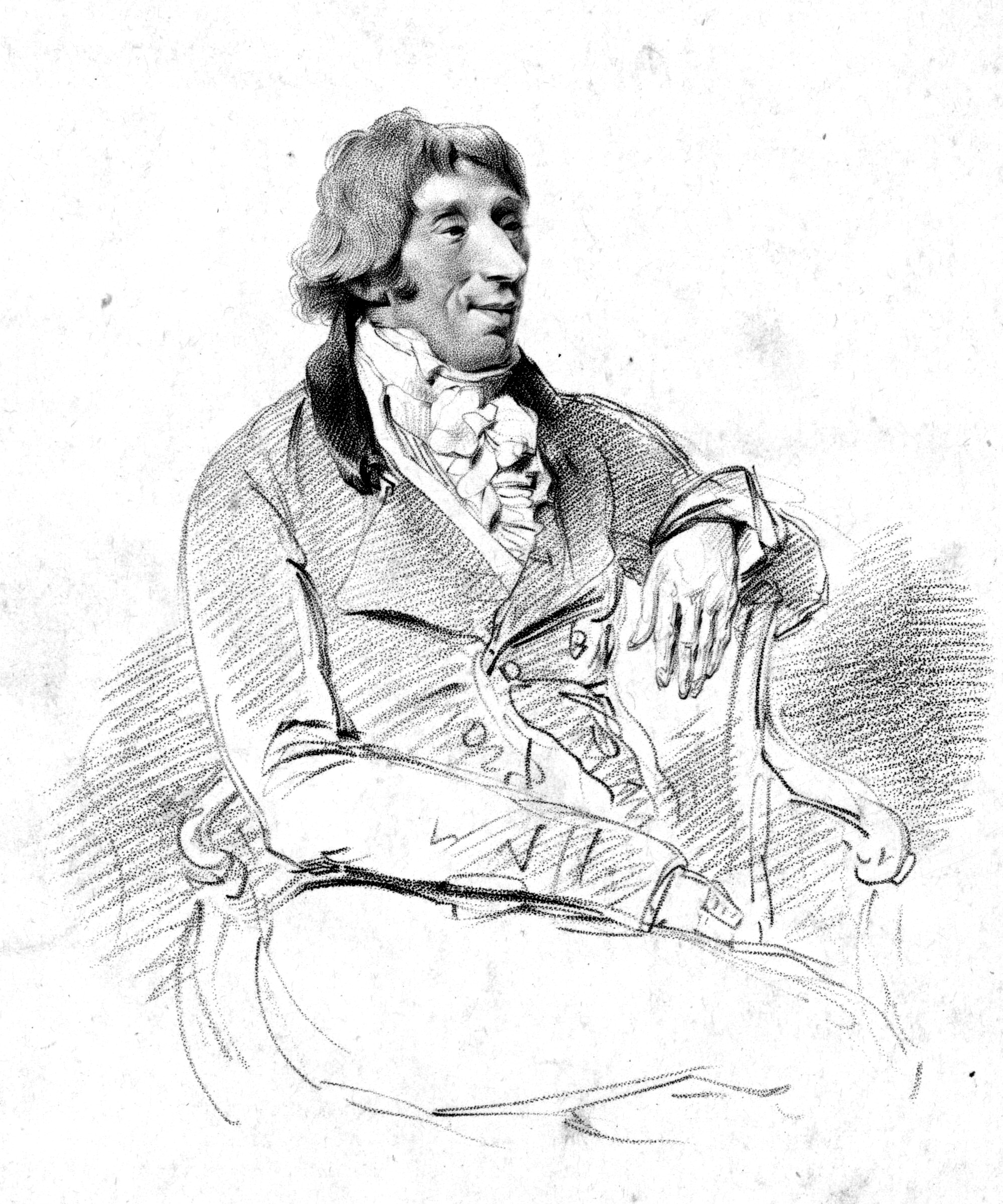
- The composer in 1805
- Librettist: Gaetano Sertor
- Language: Italian
- Premiere: 20 January 1781; Teatro di San Carlo, Naples

Arbace is an opera seria in three acts by Francesco Bianchi. The libretto was by Gaetano Sertor.

The opera was forward looking in its structure, with tension gradually mounting, via an exciting prison scene ("a fore-shadowing of romanticism") to a considerable climax. Marita P. McClymonds remarks on "The use of tonality, modality, chromaticism and strong dynamic contrasts for expressive purposes, as well as the liberal use of wind instruments ..."

== Performance history ==
The opera was first performed at the Teatro di San Carlo in Naples on 20 January 1781. It was revived again in the same theatre on 4 November that same year.

== Roles ==
Role	Voice type	Premiere Cast, 20 January 1781 (Conductor: Michele Nasci)
Arbace (Arbaces)	soprano castrato	Luigi Marchesi
Semiri, Arbace's wife	soprano	Maria Balducci
Scitalce (Sardanapalus), ruler of Assyria	tenor	Antonio Pini
Alsinda, Scitalce's sister	soprano	Elisabetta Minghelli
Idaspe	soprano castrato	Calogero Barbarini
Argante	soprano castrato	Antonio Rubinacci

== Synopsis ==
Arbace's wife Semiri is in the hands of the lascivious Assyrian tyrant Scitalce. Arbace tries to rescue her by pretending to be his own assassin. Eventually they are rescued by Idaspe, Scitalce dies in a conflagration, and Arbace becomes the new ruler of Assyria.
