= Demetrius (disambiguation) =

Demetrius may be a given name.

Demetrius or Demetrios may also refer to:

== People ==
=== Saints ===
- Saint Demetrius of Thessaloniki (270–306), Christian martyr, patron of soldiers
- Pope Demetrius I of Alexandria (189–232), Patriarch of Alexandria, contemporary of Origen
- Saint Demetrius the Neomartyr of the Peloponnese (1779–1803), Christian martyr from Greece

=== Kings ===
==== Macedon ====
- Demetrius I of Macedon (336–283 BC), surnamed Poliorcetes
- Demetrius II of Macedon (276–229 BC), surnamed Aetolicus

==== Georgia ====
- Demetrius I of Georgia (1125–1156)
- Demetrius II of Georgia (1270–1289)

==== Bactria & India ====
- Demetrius I of Bactria, Greco-Bactrian king reigning from c. 200–180 BC
- Demetrius II of India, ruled briefly during the 2nd century BC
- Demetrius III Aniketos (fl. 100 BC), Indo-Greek king

==== Seleucid Empire ====
- Demetrius I Soter of Syria (d. 150 BC)
- Demetrius II Nicator of Syria (d. 125 BC)
- Demetrius III Eucaerus (d. 88 BC)

=== Philosophers ===
- Demetrius Phalereus (c.350-c.280), Athenian orator
- Demetrius Lacon (late 2nd century BC), Epicurean philosopher
- Demetrius the Cynic (1st century), Cynic philosopher of Corinth and Rome
- Demetrius of Amphipolis (4th century BC), student of Plato

=== Other people ===
- Demetrius (somatophylax) (died 330 BC), a bodyguard of Alexander the Great
- Claude Demetrius (born August 3, 1916 – May 1, 1988), an African American songwriter
- Demetrius Joyette, Canadian actor
- Demetrius Shipp Jr., American actor
- Demetrius of Alopece (early 4th century BC), sculptor
- Demetrius of Apamea, physiologist
- Demetrius the Fair (c. 285 BC – c. 250 BC), also known as Demetrius of Cyrene, Greek Macedonian prince and Greek Cyrenaean king
- Demetrius of Pharos (d. 214 BC), Illyrian ruler
- Demetrius the Chronographer (late 3rd century BC), Jewish historian
- Demetrius of Scepsis (2nd/3rd century BC), Greek grammarian
- Demetrius (possibly 2nd century BC), author of On Style (often attributed to Demetrius of Phalerum)
- Demetrius (son of Philip V) (d. 180 BC), son of Philip V of Macedon, executed by his father for treason
- Demetrius of Magnesia (1st century BC), writer
- Demetrius (biblical figure), the name of two people in the New Testament
- Demetrius of Antioch (3rd century), bishop of Antioch
- Demetrius Triclinius (c. 1300), Byzantine scholar of ancient Greek literature
- Demetrius Cydones (1324–1397), Byzantine prime minister and theologian
- Demetrius I Starszy (1327–1399), Prince of Bryansk

== Fiction ==
- Demetrius (play), a play by Friedrich Schiller
- Demetrios (video game), a 2016 video game by COWCAT games
- Demetrius and the Gladiators, a sword and sandal epic film
- Demetrius (A Midsummer Night's Dream), a major character in A Midsummer Night's Dream by William Shakespeare
- Demetrius, a minor character in Titus Andronicus by William Shakespeare
- Demetrius, a minor character in Antony and Cleopatra by William Shakespeare

== Other uses ==
- Dimitrios (shipwreck), a wreck of a cargo ship, located on the beach of Gythio, Greece
- Hagios Demetrios, in Thessaloniki, Greece
- Operation Demetrius (1971–1975), a crackdown on paramilitary groups in Ireland by the British Army

== See also ==
- Demetrio (disambiguation)
