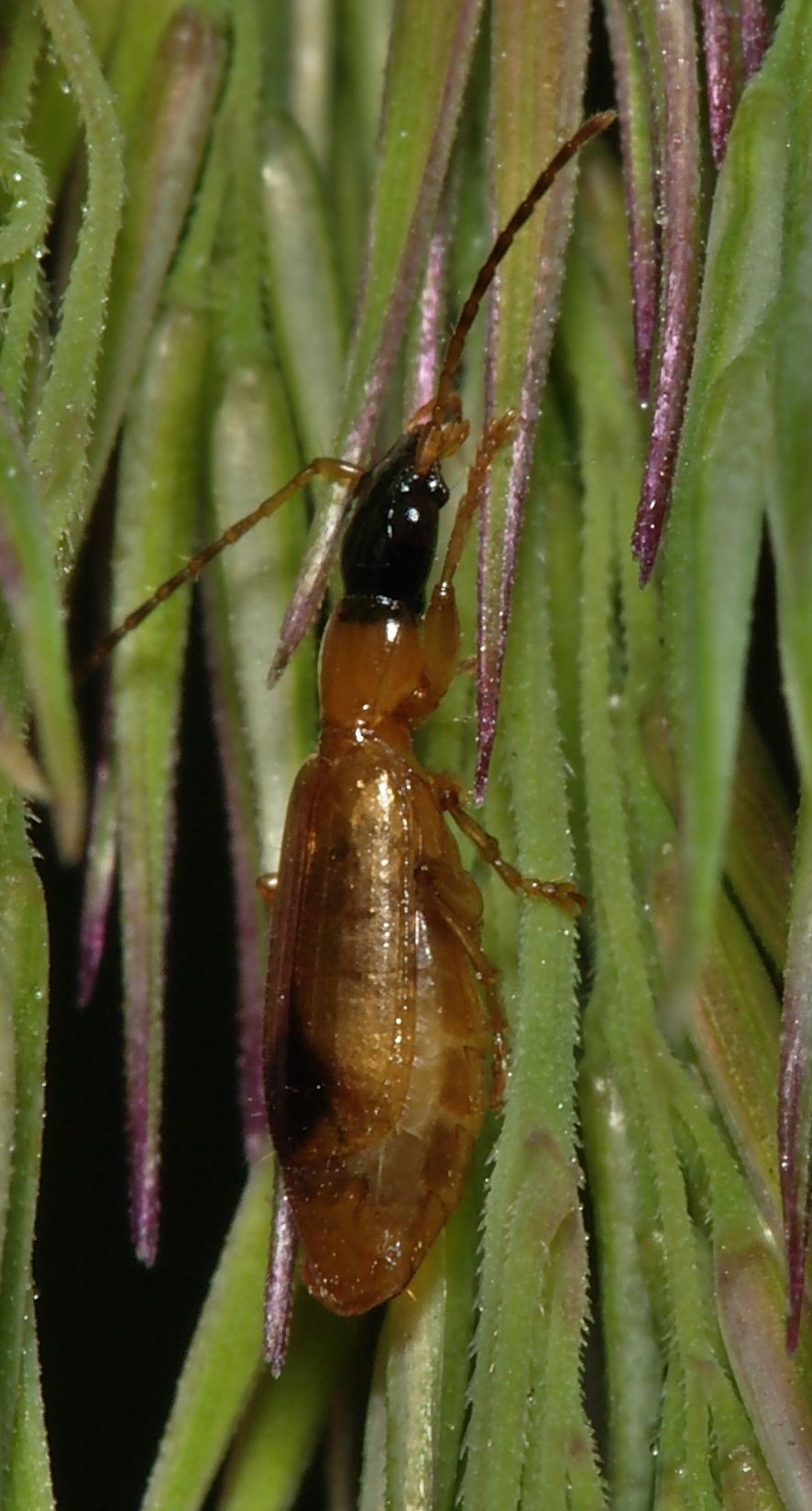
- gravid female Demetrias monostigma

Scientific classification
- Kingdom: Animalia
- Phylum: Arthropoda
- Class: Insecta
- Order: Coleoptera
- Suborder: Adephaga
- Family: Carabidae
- Subfamily: Lebiinae
- Genus: Demetrias; Bonelli, 1810

= Demetrias (beetle) =

Genus of beetles

Demetrias is a genus of ground beetle native to the Palearctic (including Europe), the Near East, and North Africa. It contains the following species:

- Demetrias amurensis Motschulsky, 1860
- Demetrias atricapillus (Linnaeus, 1758)
- Demetrias imperialis Germar, 1824
- Demetrias longicollis Chaudoir, 1877
- Demetrias longicornis Chaudoir, 1846
- Demetrias marginicollis Bates, 1883
- Demetrias monostigma Samouelle, 1819
- Demetrias muchei Jedlicka, 1967
- Demetrias nigricornis Chaudoir, 1877
