= Demetrias in Assyria =

Hellenistic city in Assyria

Demetrias (Ancient Greek: Δημητριάς) was a Hellenistic city in Assyria, near Arbela. It was probably founded by Demetrius I Soter (a Seleucid king of Syria), in commemoration of his victory over the rebel Timarchus of Babylon, in 160 B.C. It was located at the bank of Tigris and minted its own bronze coinage with the inscription ΔΗΜΗΤΡΙΕΩΝ ΤΩΝ ΠΡΟΣ ΤΩΙ ΤΙΓΡΕΙ, (of the Demetrians by the Tigris), with the figures of Tyche and a tripod.

== Sources ==
- Chaumont "Villes helleniqes" 153,155.
