= Demetrio (1779) =

Opera by Josef Mysliveček (1779)

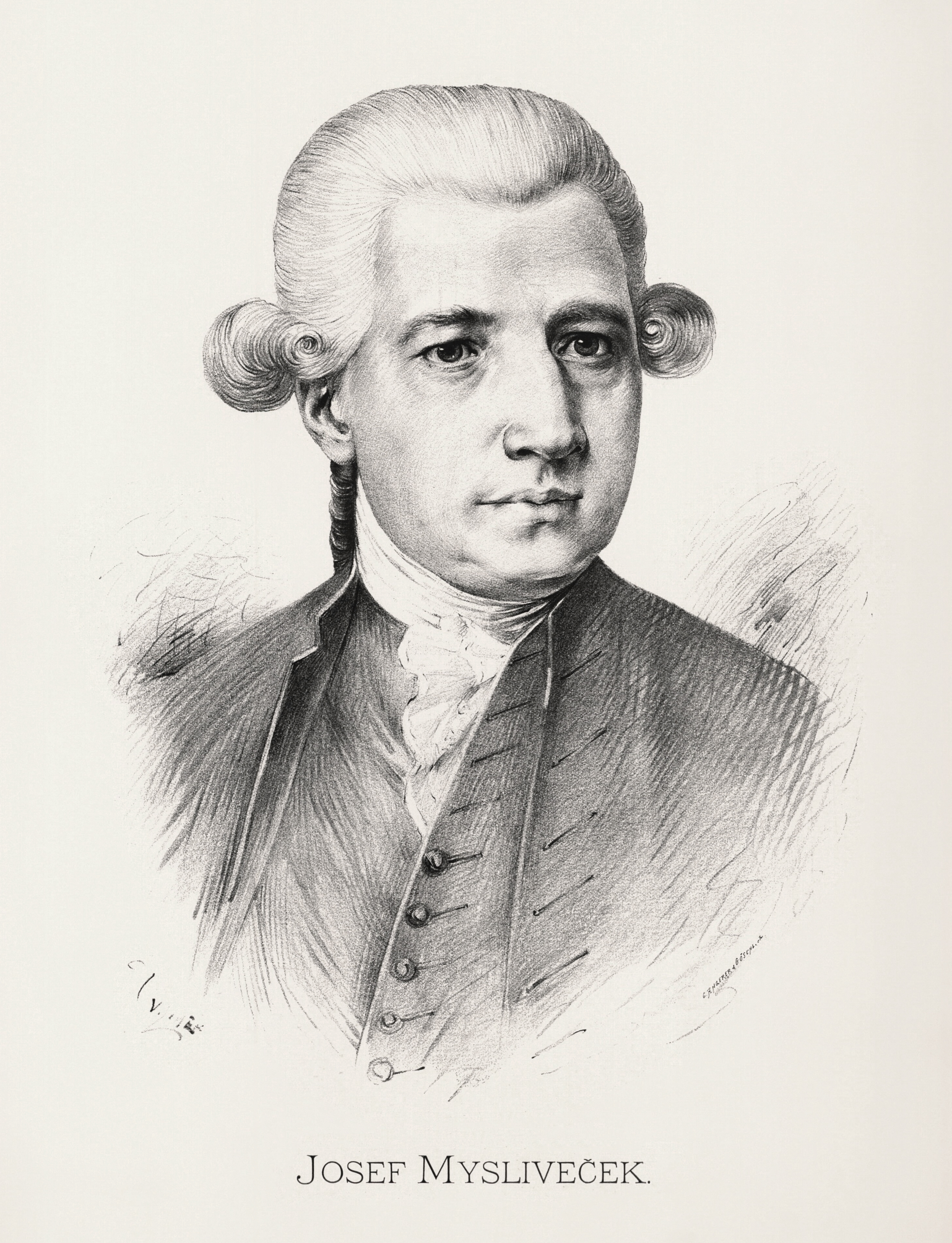
Josef Mysliveček

Demetrio is an eighteenth-century Italian opera in 3 acts by the Czech composer Josef Mysliveček. It was the composer's second setting of a libretto by the Italian poet Metastasio that was first performed in Vienna in 1731 with music by Antonio Caldara, one of the most popular of the Metastasian librettos in Mysliveček's day. For a performance in the 1770s, it would only be expected that a libretto of such age would be abbreviated and altered to suit contemporary operatic taste. The cuts and changes in the text made for the 1779 performance of Mysliveček's opera are not attributable. All of Mysliveček's operas are of the serious type in Italian language referred to as opera seria that usually feature the designation dramma per musica in librettos. .

== Performance history ==
The opera was first performed at the Teatro San Carlo in Naples on 13 August 1779 in honor of the birthday of the queen of Naples, Maria Carolina. It was the last of the nine operas composed by Mysliveček for the Teatro San Carlo between the years 1767–1779, a larger number than by any other composer during the same period. It was only a modest success, however, and its run was interrupted by an eruption of the volcano Mount Vesuvius. The cast was not particularly distinguished for a production at the San Carlo, but it did include the castrato Domenico Bedini, who would later appear in Wolfgang Amadeus Mozart's opera La clemenza di Tito in Prague in 1791.

== Roles ==
Role	Voice type	Premiere cast, 13 August 1779, Teatro San Carlo, Naples
Cleonice, queen of Syria, in love with Alceste	soprano	Rosa Agostini
Alceste, later revealed to be Demetrio, king of Syria	soprano castrato	Domenico Bedini
Fenicio, grandee of the realm, tutor of Alceste, and father of Olinto	tenor	Gaetano Scovelli
Olinto, grandee of the realm and rival of Alceste	soprano castrato	Gaspare de Filippis
Barsene, confidante of Cleonice and secretly in love with Alceste	soprano	Caterina Lusini
Mitrane, captain of the guards and friend of Fenicio	soprano	Antonia Rubinacci (in a breeches role)

== Vocal set pieces ==
Act I, scene 1 - Aria of Cleonice, "Fra tanti pensieri"
Act I, scene 2 - Aria of Fenicio, "Se fecondo, e vigoroso"
Act I, scene 3 - Aria of Alceste, "Scherza il nocchier talora"
Act I, scene 4 - Aria of Olinto, "Che mi giova l'onor della cuna"
Act I, scene 5 - Aria of Barsene, "Dal labbro che t'accende"
Act I, scene 7 - Duet for Cleonice and Alceste, "Ah, se di te mi privi"

Act II, scene 1 - Aria of Olinto, "È la fede degli amanti"
Act II, scene 2 - Aria of Mitrane, "Dice che t'è fedele"
Act II, scene 5 - Aria of Cleonice, "Nacqui agl'affanni in seno"
Act II, scene 6 - Aria of Fenicio, "Alme incaute che torbide ancora"
Act II, scene 7 - Aria of Barsene, "So che per gioco"
Act II, scene 8 - Aria of Olinto, "Non fidi al mar che freme"
Act II, scene 10 - Aria of Alceste, "Non so frenare il pianto"
Act II, scene 12 - Aria of Cleonice, "Mi parea del porto in seno" [a non-Metastasian text]

Act III, scene 1 - Aria of Cleonice, "Io so qual pena sia"
Act III, scene 2 - Aria of Alceste, "Quel labbro adorato"
Act III, scene 3 - Aria of Fenicio, "Giusti Dei da voi non chiede"
Act III, scene 4 - Aria of Barsene, "Semplicetta tortorella"

== Score ==
The complete score of Mysliveček's Demetrio of 1779 is available for study online on the Italian website Internet Culturale in the form of a reproduction of a manuscript once in the possession of the Teatro San Carlo of Naples.

== See also ==
- Demetrio, 1773 version
