= Calto (opera) =

- Opera seria by Francesco Bianchi
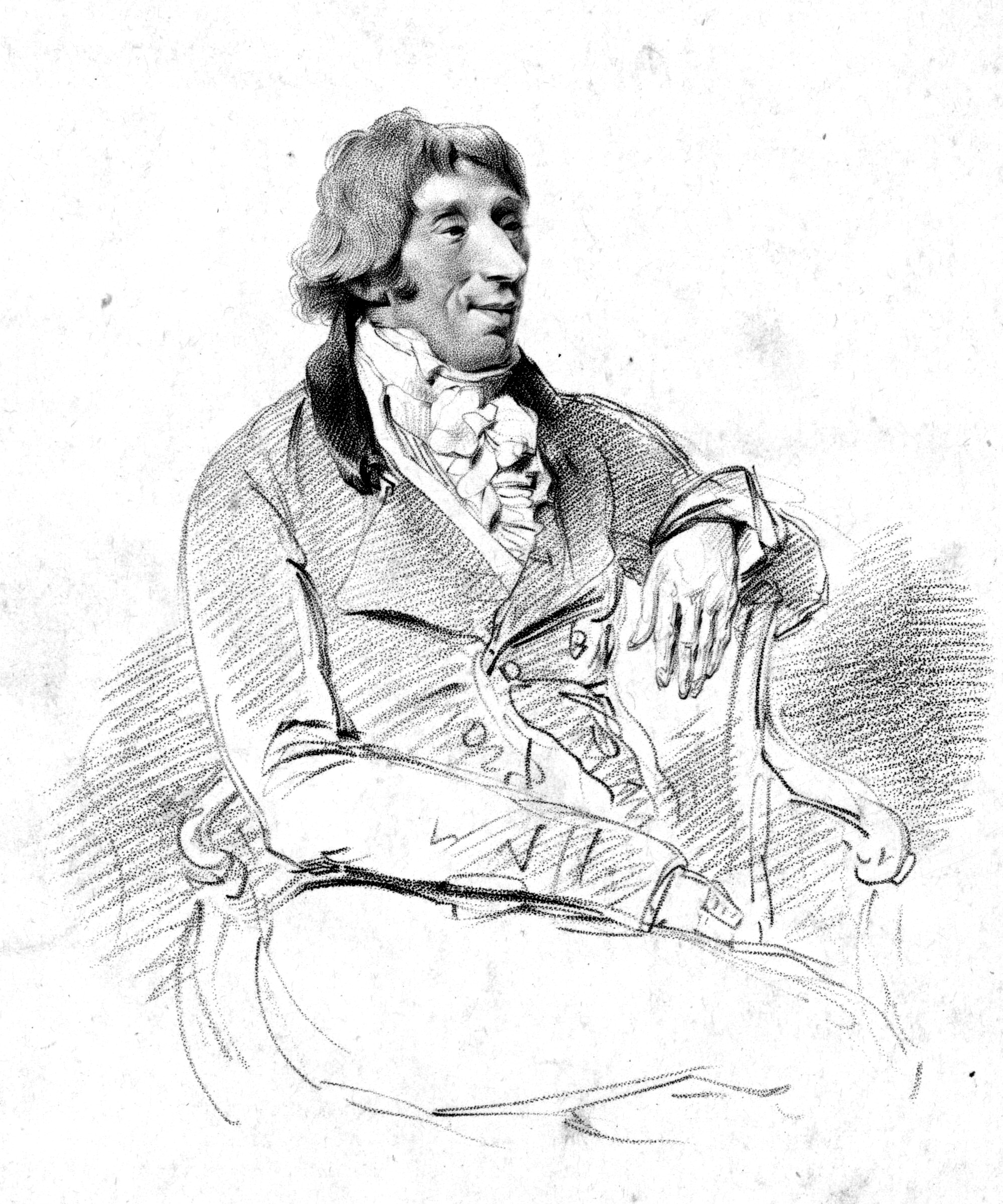
- The composer in 1805
- Librettist: Giuseppe Foppa
- Language: Italian
- Based on: Celtic poetry by Ossian (James Macpherson)
- Premiere: 7 February 1786; Teatro San Benedetto, Venice

Calto is an opera seria in three acts by Francesco Bianchi. The libretto was by Giuseppe Maria Foppa, after the 'Celtic' poetry of Ossian. The opera was first performed at the Teatro San Benedetto in Venice on 23 January 1788.

Calto was an innovative work with some special instrumentation. As Marita P. McClymonds explains "Bianchi uses flat keys, fluctuating modes, chromatic dissonances and an unusually wide range of wind timbres (oboe, bassoon, clarinet, horn and English horn) for maximum dramatic effect."

== Roles ==
Role	Voice type	Premiere Cast, 23 January 1788 (Conductor:)
Duntalmo, usurper king	tenor	Giuseppe Bertelli
Corimba, Duntalmo's daughter, secretly married to Calto	soprano	Maria Giacinta Galli
Sinveno	soprano castrato	Tommaso Catena
Calto, son of the rightful king killed by Duntalmo, adopted by Sinveno	soprano castrato	Giovanni Rubinelli
Asteria	soprano	Maria Bellavigna
Conalbo	tenor	Antonio Mora

== Synopsis ==
Calto claims his rightful throne from the usurper Duntalmo, but the latter is saved by Corimba, who turns out to be both Duntalmo's daughter and the mother of Calto's two children.
