= Zemira =

- Opera seria by Francesco Bianchi
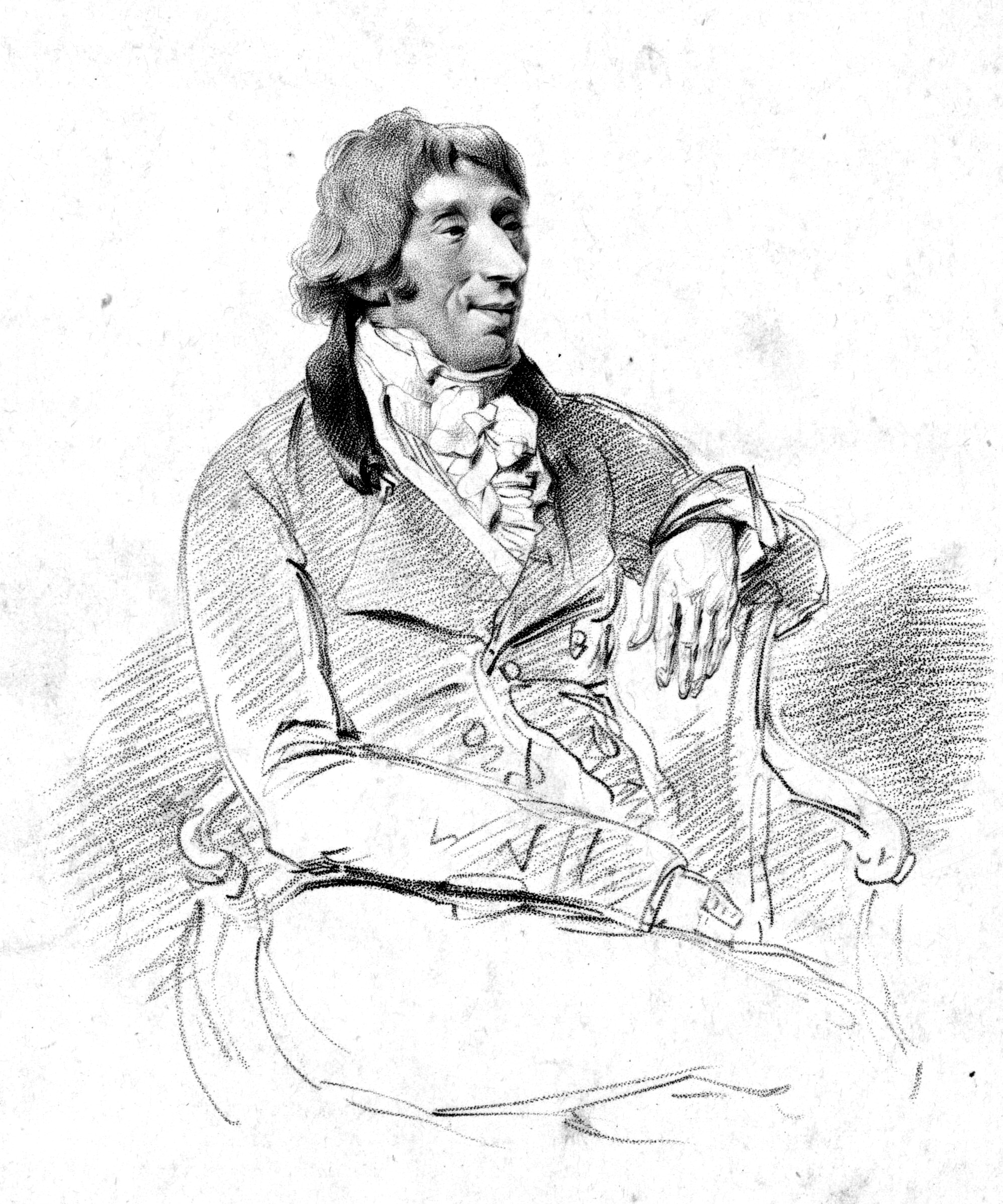
- The composer in 1805
- Librettist: Gaetano Sertor
- Language: Italian
- Premiere: 4 November 1781; Teatro di San Carlo, Naples

Zemira is an opera seria in three acts by Francesco Bianchi. The libretto was by Gaetano Sertor.

Zemira like other works by Bianchi, was innovative. As Marita P. McClymonds explains, "Unusual components in this work are the opening trio with storm music, the short duet for two men, the programmatic battle music, the extensive quartet . . . The version for Naples features extensive use of clarinets . . . available there some ten years earlier than in other Italian cities."

== Performance history ==
The opera was first performed at the Teatro di San Carlo in Naples on 4 November 1781. It was revised for the Teatro Nuovo in Padua probably on 13 June 1786, this time omitting the introduzione and the scene of the stabbing of Zemira.

== Roles ==
Role	Voice type	Premiere Cast, 4 November 1781 (Conductor: Michele Nasci)
Sarabes, principal rajah of India	tenor	
Zemira, Sarabes's daughter	soprano	
Akbar, Mogol emperor	soprano castrato	
Gandarte, a rajah, betrothed to Zemira	soprano castrato	

== Synopsis ==
The Emperor Akbar tries to win Zemira in the face of determined opposition from her father, Sarabes, and her intended husband, Gandarte. Ultimately Zemira is stabbed to death by her father, and Akbar pardons Gandarte.
