= Demetria terragena =

Scientific classification
- Domain: Bacteria
- Kingdom: Bacillati
- Phylum: Actinomycetota
- Class: Actinomycetes
- Order: Micrococcales
- Family: Dermacoccaceae
- Genus: Demetria; Groth et al. 1997
- Species: D. terragena

Binomial name
- Demetria terragena Groth et al. 1997

Type strain
- CIP 105501; DSM 11295; HK1 0089T; HKI 89; IFO 16164; JCM 11480; NBRC 16164

Species of bacterium

Demetria terragena is a species of bacteria. Its cells are gram-positive, not acid fast, non-motile, non-sporulating, irregular coccoid to short rod-shaped and microaerophilic.
