= Finale concertato =

Finale of an opera's penultimate acts

A finale concertato (Italian: [fiˈnaːle kontʃerˈtaːto], lit. 'concerted finale'; (Note: Also referred to in English as a "concertato finale", using English word order.) plural: finali concertati) is any finale of an opera's penultimate acts which features several main characters singing simultaneously but independently, often expressing different emotions or perspectives.

Quoting Denise Gallo, “by the late eighteenth century, the finale concertato was gaining popularity; by the following century, it had become standard fare.” According to Scott F. Balthazar, “[b]y the 1830s, it had a clear and relatively conventional form.” Finali concertati may be found in the operas of such composers as Gioachino Rossini and Giuseppe Verdi.

== Sources ==
- Balthazar, Scott L. (1991). "Mayr, Rossini, and the Development of the Early Concertato Finale". Journal of the Royal Musical Association. 116 (2). Cambridge University Press: 236–266. JSTOR 766340.
- Gallo, Denise (2013). Opera: The Basics.
- Lowry, Harold A. (1966). The Concerted Finale in 18th Century Italian Opera Buffa as Developed by Logroscino, Galuppi, and Piccinni.
- Sutherland Edwards, H. (1869). The Life of Rossini.
