= Antonio Capuzzi =

Italian violinist and composer

Giuseppe Antonio Capuzzi (also Capucci; 1 August 1755 – 28 March 1818) was an Italian violinist and composer.

He studied in Venice, Italy under the direction of A. Nazari (violin) and F. G. Bertoni (composition). Beginning in 1780, he was concertmaster with the orchestra at the Teatro di S. Samuele and eventually became the orchestral director at the Teatro di S. Benedetto. After his tenure at the Teatro di S. Samuele in 1805, he became orchestral director and a professor at the Bergamo Conservatory then located at the S. Maria Maggiore.

Although popular in his day, most of his music is now forgotten. The most commonly performed piece today is his concerto for double bass. The concerto was found in the British Museum, and was dedicated to Kavalier Marcantonio Montenigo, who is assumed to have performed on that instrument. An arrangement of the second (andante) and third (rondo) movements of the concerto is also performed on tuba, euphonium, and trombone. In addition Philip Catelinet arranged all three movements of the concerto for concert band and symphony orchestra. He performed it several times during his tenure at the Carnegie Mellon University in Pittsburgh, PA. His students also performed this piece. The parts may be obtained from Barry Catelinet. Several of Capuzzi's string quintets are also performed by chamber groups.

He was also a prolific composer of ballets that took place between acts of plays and operas. The most famous ballet was La villageoise, performed in London in 1796. His other known works include 5 operas, 11 ballets, 4 violin concertos, 18 string quartets, and other chamber music.
