= Tour de Force =

Tour de Force may refer to:

- tour de force, a French phrase, translated as "feat of strength"

== Film ==
- Tour de Force (film), a 2014 German drama film directed by Christian Zübert
- Tour de Force (2013 film), a 2013 French movie, directed by Laurent Tuel

== Literature ==
- Tour de Force (novel), a 1955 novel by Christianna Brand
- Tour de Force, a 2021 book by professional cyclist Mark Cavendish

== Music ==
- Tour De Force (tour), 1986 Elton John concert tour
- Tour de Force (Sonny Rollins album), 1956
- Tour de Force (Bola Sete album), 1963
- Tour de Force (38 Special album), 1984
- Tour de Force (Nick Brignola album), 2002
- Tour De Force – Live, a 1982 live album by jazz guitarist Al Di Meola
- "Tour de Force", a 1999 song by Covenant on their 2000 album United States of Mind
