= La villanella rapita =

- Opera giocosa by Francesco Bianchi
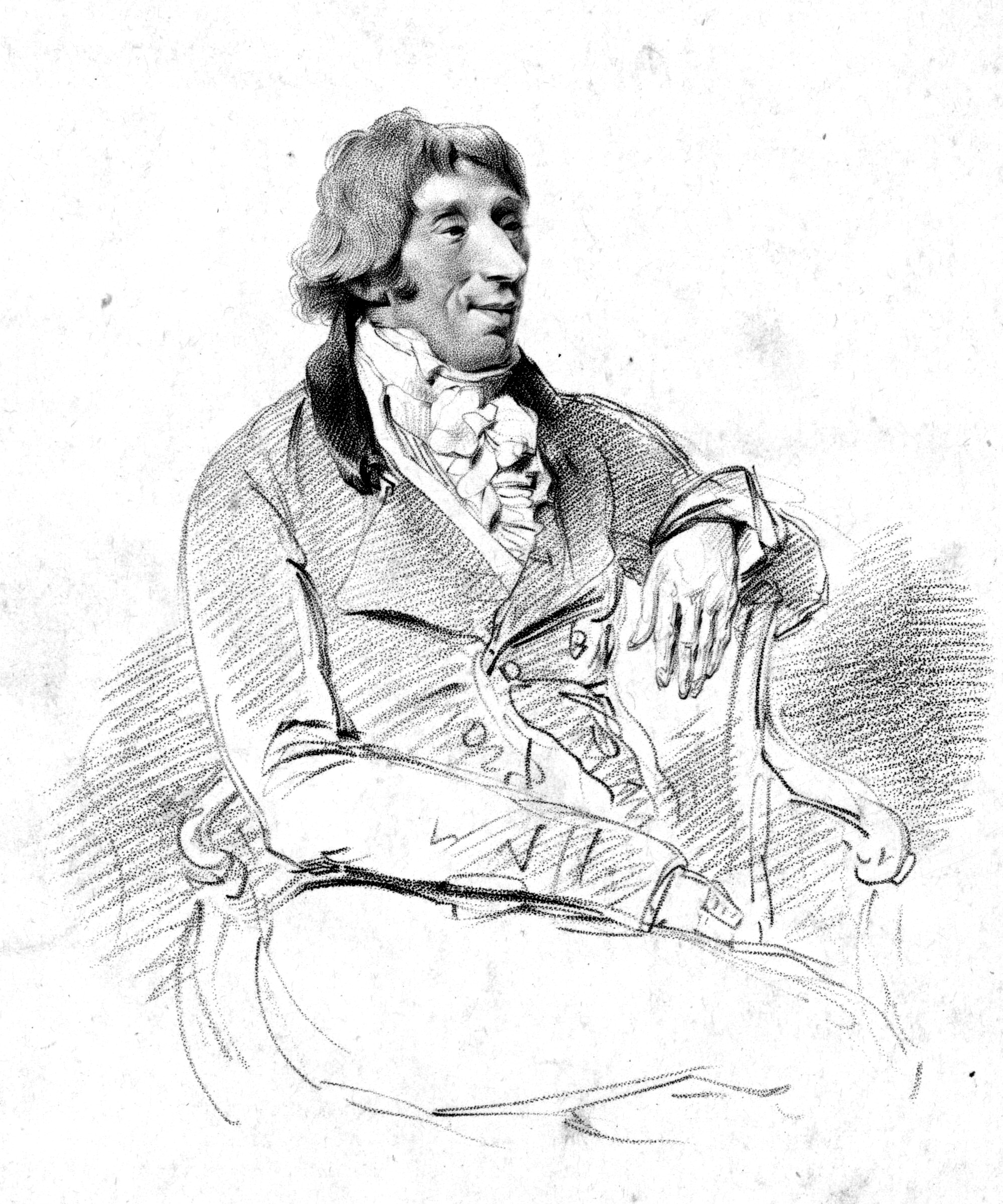
- The composer in 1805
- Librettist: Giovanni Bertati
- Language: Italian
- Premiere: 1783; Teatro San Moisè, Venice

La villanella rapita (The Abducted Country Girl) is an opera giocosa in two acts by Francesco Bianchi with additional arias by Wolfgang Amadeus Mozart for its later performances in Vienna. The libretto was by Giovanni Bertati.

== Performance history ==
The opera was first performed at the Teatro San Moisè in Venice in the autumn of 1783. It was then given at the Eszterháza Theater in Süttör, Fertőd, on 29 August 1784. It was also produced at the Little Theatre in the Haymarket in London under Vincenzo Federici on 27 February 1790.

A pasticcio with the same title, with some music by Bianchi as well as Paisiello, Guglielmi, Giacomo Gotifredo Ferrari, Sarti and Soler was performed at Théâtre Feydeau in Paris on 5 June 1789.

== Mozart additions ==
Wolfgang Amadeus Mozart contributed a vocal quartet, "Dite almeno in che mancai?", K. 479, and a vocal terzet, "Mandina amabile", K. 480, for a performance at the Burgtheater in Vienna on 1785. (The former work was first heard in public on 5 November, and the latter on 28 November.) The singers involved were Vincenzo Calvesi (Count), Celeste Coltellini (Mandina), Stefano Mandini (Pippo), and Francesco Bussani (Biaggio), the last named in K. 479 only.

== Roles ==
Roles, voice types
Role	Voice type
Biaggio	bass
Ninetta, Biaggio's daughter	soprano
Giannina, Biaggio's daughter	soprano
Mandina, Biaggio's daughter, about to be married to Pippo	soprano
Pippo, Mandina's bridegroom	baritone
The count	tenor
Paulino, the count's friend	tenor

== Synopsis ==
The count takes a liking to a young bride, Mandina, at her pre-wedding banquet, lures her away from her bridegroom, Pippo, and then abducts her in a drugged state back to his palace. Mandina, after a little experience of upper-class luxuries, eventually establishes her innocence and marries Pippo after all.
