= Francesco Bianchi (composer) =

Italian composer

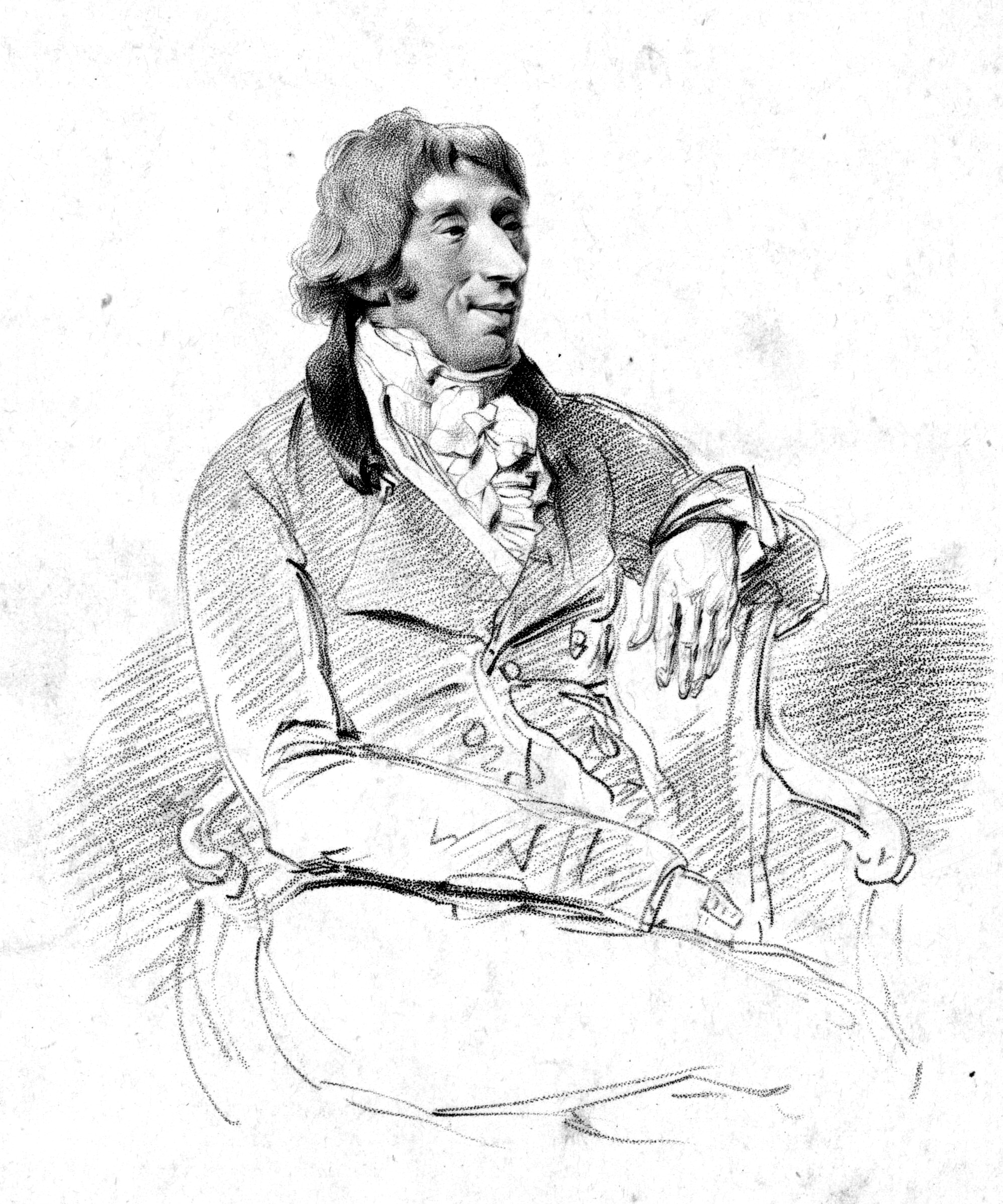
Francesco Bianchi

Giuseppe Francesco Bianchi (1752 – 27 November 1810) was an Italian opera composer of the Classical era. Born in Cremona, Lombardy, he studied with Pasquale Cafaro and Niccolò Jommelli, and worked mainly in London, Paris, and the Italian operatic centres of Venice, Naples, Rome, Milan, Turin, and Florence. He was the maestro al cembalo (keyboard accompanist) at the Comédie-Italienne in Paris between 1775 and 1778. He later served as the deputy chapel master maestro di cappella at the Milan Cathedral between 1782 and 1793. Concurrently, he was an organist at St. Mark's Basilica in Venice between 1785 and 1791, then was centered in Venice as the organist there between 1792 and 1797. His connections with London began in 1794, and he was also the director of the theatres in Dublin between 1798 and 1802. From his time, except for occasional travel to the continent, mainly to Paris, up to 1807, he was centered in or near London for the remainder of his life.

He wrote at least 78 operas of all genres, mainly in the field of Italian opera, but also some works in French. These include the drammi per musica (opere serie) Castore e Polluce (Florence 1779); Arbace and Zemira (both Naples, 1781); Alonso e Cora (Venice, 1786); Calto and La morte di Cesare (both Venice, 1788); and Seleuco, re di Siria (Venice, 1791). In addition, he achieved notable success with the opera buffa La villanella rapita (Süttör, 1784). As performed at the Burgtheater in Vienna in 1785, the latter featured additional vocal pieces by Mozart (the quartet "Dite almeno in che mancai?", K. 479, and the terzetto "Mandina amabile", K. 480).

Bianchi committed suicide in Hammersmith, London, in November 1810, probably due to family troubles, in particular grief over the death of his only child, a daughter who died at the age of five in 1807. He was buried alongside his daughter in the churchyard of the old Kensington Church, now St Mary Abbots, Kensington.

His widow published parts of his "theoretical work" in the Quarterly Music Review for 1820/1821.

== Private life ==
In 1800, Bianchi married Jane Jackson, a well-known singer active mainly in London. She had a continuing career after Bianchi's death and married William Lacy, another singer with whom she performed for seven years (1818-1825) at the court of King Saadat Ali Khan II in Oudh in north India.

== Bianchi and Mozart's arrangement "Ridente la calma" ==
Bianchi’s first acquaintance with the great castrato singer Luigi Marchesi in the autumn of 1779 as part of a performance of his opera Castore e Polluce in Florence had unexpected consequences for both men. In Marchesi’s case, it initiated a period of over a decade in which he carried arias with him that were specifically crafted as short, simple vocal pieces intended for him to sing in the final acts of various drammi per musica. As regards Bianchi, Marchesi became an advocate for his music, a role that led eventually to the composition of the renowned vocal piece “Ridente la calma”, K. Anh.A 36 (formerly K. 152 and 210a), an arrangement (or transcription) for voice and piano by Mozart that was based for the most part on music by Josef Mysliveček but incorporated a few of Bianchi’s musical ideas.

The origins of Mozart’s arrangement “Ridente la calma” can be traced to the aria “Se piangi, se peni” from the final act of Bianchi’s Castore e Polluce, a vocal piece whose style matches the character of a “reform” opera by incorporating arias of modest length with simple, “natural” melodic lines devoid of elaborate coloratura. Marchesi was so pleased with Bianchi’s “Se piangi, se peni” that he had it inserted into the next opera performed during the autumn season in Florence of 1779, Giuseppe Sarti’s Achille in Sciro. Marchesi then brought “Se piangi, se peni” with him to the Teatro alla Scala in Milan at the end of the year 1779, where he clearly intended to insert it in the final act of Mysliveček’s opera Armida for the carnival operatic season of 1780.

The insertion of the aria would have been a problem for Mysliveček, however, who was averse to permitting arias by other composers to be used in the first performances of his operas (not a single case of which has ever been identified in any of the scores prepared for his operatic premières). Instead of incorporating a Bianchi aria into his score, Mysliveček supplied Marchesi with a new short aria in simple style for the beginning of the final act of Armida: “Il caro mio bene.” As can be seen by comparing the arias “Se piangi, se peni” by Bianchi and “Il caro mio bene” by Mysliveček, the latter was clearly based closely on the former. Each is in the same key and same old-fashioned dal-segno format and share similar length, similar tempo, similar triple meter, the same instrumentation with flutes, and very similar melodic profiles. The audiences did not care for the result that Mysliveček produced, but his aria enjoyed long-term success. It circulated as an independent vocal piece attributed to Mysliveček, and Marchesi must have carried it with him as a favored aria for years, the likely means by which the music eventually came into Mozart’s hands. Press reports confirm that Bianchi’s “Se piangi, se peni” made it into performances of Armida after all, as many of Mysliveček arias for the roles sung by Marchesi and Caterina Gabrielli were substituted after the composer departed for Rome to supervise the première of his next opera, Medonte. Marchesi achieved notable success in Milan with Bianchi’s “Se piangi, se peni.”

New information concerning Mozart’s use of the music from Mysliveček’s aria “Il caro mio bene” and the replacement of Mysliveček’s text with “Ridente la calma” has recently been compiled by the Italian musicologist Lucio Tufano. As far as Mozart’s arrangement “Ridente la calma” is concerned, the next important aria to be singled out after “Il caro io bene” would be Bianchi’s aria “Ridente la calma” as it appeared in the final act of his opera Il trionfo della pace for Turin in 1782. This aria, in similar musical style to both Bianchi’s earlier aria “Se piangi, se peni” and Mysliveček’s “Il caro mio bene,” was set to the same text as Mozart’s arrangement “Ridente la calma”. The music for Mozart’s setting of “Ridente la calma” differs little from that found in Mysliveček’s “Il caro mio bene”, but the middle of Bianchi’s version seems to have been the source of some musical features of the middle section of Mozart’s arrangement. Marchesi likely brought the music for the arias of Mysliveček and Bianchi to Mozart’s attention when both men were present in Vienna in 1785 during the preparations and performance of Giuseppe Sarti’s opera Giulio Sabino, in which Marchesi appeared. For unknown reasons, Mozart chose to draw inspiration mainly from Mysliveček’s music, but he used the text from Bianchi’s aria. The latest edition of the Köchel catalogue specifies the date of composition of Mozart’s arrangement “Il caro mio bene” as “presumably around 1785” in Vienna.

== Works ==
=== Operas ===
- See: List of operas by Francesco Bianchi

=== Religious compositions ===
- Domine ad adiuvandum, 2 August 1773, Cremona
- Converte Domine, 10 May 1779, Milan, Metropolitan Cathedral
- Exalta Domine, 10 May 1779, Milan, Metropolitan Cathedral
- Deus noster refugium con Gloria patri, 10 May 1779, Milan, Metropolitan Cathedral
- Abraham et Isaac; Tres pueri hebrai; others
