= Dermacoccaceae =

Scientific classification
- Domain: Bacteria
- Kingdom: Bacillati
- Phylum: Actinomycetota
- Class: Actinomycetes
- Order: Micrococcales
- Family: Dermacoccaceae; Schumann and Stackebrandt 2000

Type genus
- Dermacoccus Stackebrandt et al. 1995

Genera
- Allobranchiibius Ai et al. 2017; Barrientosiimonas Lee et al. 2013; Branchiibius Sugimoto et al. 2011; Calidifontibacter Ruckmani et al. 2011; Demetria Groth et al. 1997; Dermacoccus Stackebrandt et al. 1995; Flexivirga Anzai et al. 2012; Leekyejoonella Lee et al. 2020; Luteipulveratus Ara et al. 2010; "Metallococcus" Lim et al. 2021; Rudaeicoccus Kim et al. 2013; Yimella Tang et al. 2010

Family of bacteria

The Dermacoccaceae is a family of bacteria placed within the order of Micrococcales. Bacteria af this familia are Gram-positive, non-spore-forming and non-motile. Dermacoccaceae bacteria occur on the skin.

== Phylogeny ==
The currently accepted taxonomy is based on the List of Prokaryotic names with Standing in Nomenclature and the phylogeny is based on whole-genome sequences. (Note: Allobranchiibius, Barrientosiimonas, Calidifontibacter, Dermacoccus, Flexivirga, Leekyejoonella, Rudaeicoccus, and Yimella are not included in this phylogenetic tree.)

- - Dermacoccaceae
    - Branchiibius
    - - Demetria
      - Luteipulveratus
  - outgroup
    Intrasporangiaceae
