= Jana Hrochová =

Czech mezzo-soprano

- Education: Prague Conservatory
- Occupation: Operatic mezzo-soprano
- Organizations: National Theatre Brno
- Website: www.janahrochova.cz

Jana Hrochová née Štefáčková is a Czech operatic mezzo-soprano, based at the National Theatre Brno and appearing internationally in opera and concert, also under the name Wallingerová.

== Life and career ==
Jana Štefáčková sang in a children's choir in Šumperk, Moravia. She studied at the Prague Conservatory from 1993 to 1999, with Jarmila Krásová. She was a member of the Opera Mozart in Prague from 1997 to 2000, and also performed ancient music with the ensemble Ars Cameralis and folk music with the ensemble Muzika Jara.

=== Opera ===
Since 2000, she has been a member of the opera ensemble at the National Theatre Brno where she appeared as Bizet's Carmen, Rossini's Rosina in Il barbiere di Siviglia, Puccini's Suzuki in Madame Butterfly, Varvara in Janáček's Káťa Kabanová, Fenena in Verdi's Nabucco, Hänsel in Humperdinck's Hänsel und Gretel, and Nicklausse in Offenbach's Les. She also performed there the roles of Laura in Ponchielli's La Gioconda, Káča in The Devil and Kate, Gold-Spur the Fox in Janáček's The Cunning Little Vixen, among others.

She has sung as a guest at Czech opera houses including the National Theatre in Prague, and at houses in Europe such as Theater Freiburg. In 2016 she first sang at the BBC Proms, in a concert performance at the Royal Albert Hall in London of Janáček's The Makropulos Affair, with the BBC Symphony Orchestra conducted by Bělohlávek; she performed the Chambermaid alongside Karita Mattila as Emilia Marty.

=== Concert ===
Hrochová sang the alto solo of Dvořák's Requiem at the state funeral of Václav Havel. She appeared at Birmingham's Symphony Hall in a 2015 performance of Mahler's Second Symphony, played by the Czech Philharmonic conducted by Jiří Bělohlávek. A reviewer noted:

Mezzo-soprano Jana Hrochová-Wallingerová's performance of the haunting fourth movement was beautifully controlled and convincing as she delivered the reflective core of the symphony from the anonymous German folk-poems Des Knaben Wunderhorn.

She performed in Dvořák's oratorio Saint Ludmila at St. Vitus Cathedral in Prague in 2021, performed as part of the Dvořákova Praha festival, commemorating the 1,100th anniversary of the Saint's death by the Prague Philharmonic Choir, the Czech Philharmonic, soprano Eva Hornyáková, tenor Richard Samek and bass Gustáv Beláček, conducted by Petr Altrichter.

She appeared at the 2023 Rheingau Musik Festival in a concert at Eberbach Abbey of Mahler's Second Symphony, alongside soprano Pavla Vykopalová and with chorus and orchestra of the Filharmonie Brno conducted by Dennis Russell Davies.
