= Il re pastore (libretto) =

Il re pastore is a 1750 Italian-language opera libretto written by Metastasio. It was first set by Giuseppe Bonno in 1751, but best known today in the version by Gluck (1756) and Il re pastore by Mozart (1775).

== Settings ==
- Giuseppe Bonno (Vienna, 27 October 1751)
- Arvid Niclas von Höpken (1752)
- Giuseppe Sarti (Pesaro, 1752)
- Francesco Antonio Baldassare Uttini (Drottningholm, 24 July 1755)
- Johann Adolph Hasse (Hubertusburg, 7 October 1755)
- Maria Teresa Agnesi (c. 1755–1760)
- Christoph Willibald Gluck (Vienna, 8 December 1756) – Il re pastore
- Giovanni Battista Lampugnani (Milan, April 1758)
- Giuseppe Zonca (Bavaria, 1760)
- Niccolò Piccinni (Florence, 27 August 1760)
- Niccolò Jommelli (Ludwigsburg, 4 November 1764)
- Pietro Alessandro Guglielmi (Venice, 1767)
- Baldassare Galuppi (Parma, 1762)
- Felice Giardini (London, 7 March 1765)
- Antonio Tozzi (Braunschweig, 1766 or 1767)
- Anton Bachschmidt (1774)
- Wolfgang Amadeus Mozart (Salzburg, 23 April 1775) – Il re pastore
- Tommaso Giordani (London, 30 May 1768)
- Matteo Rauzzini (Dublin, carnival 1784)
- Luciano Xavier Santos (1797)
- Johann Friedrich Agricola (?)
- Paolo Francesco Parenti (?)
- Johann Christoph Richter (1762, Dresden)
- Pietro Pompeo Sales (s. d.)
