= Adriano in Siria (Mysliveček) =

Opera by Josef Mysliveček

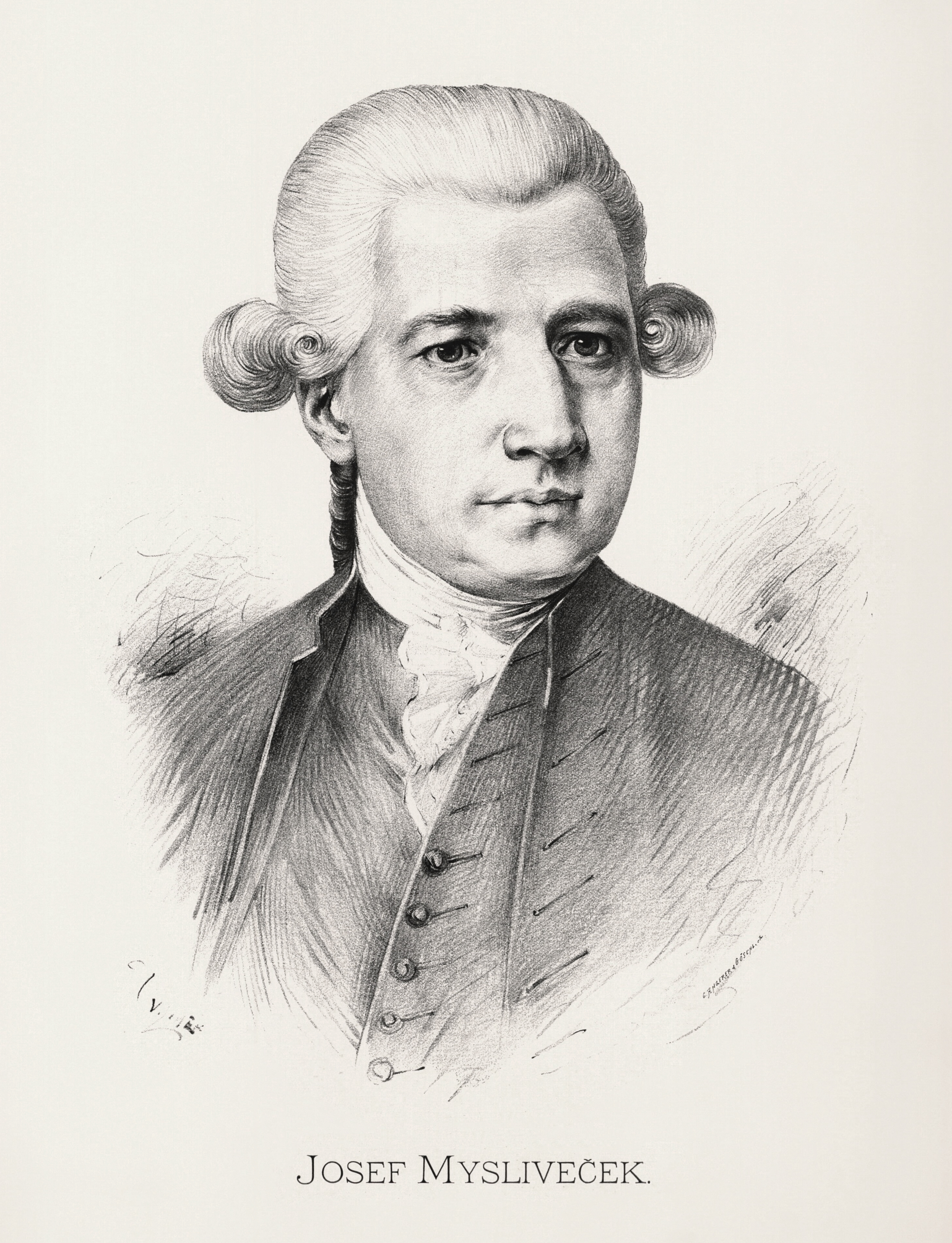
Josef Mysliveček

Adriano in Siria ("Hadrian in Syria") is an 18th-century Italian opera seria in 3 acts by the Czech composer Josef Mysliveček. It was composed to a libretto of the same name by the Italian poet Metastasio that was first performed in 1732 with music of Antonio Caldara and in more than 60 further settings until 1828. For a performance in the 1770s, it would only be expected that a libretto of such age would be abbreviated and altered to suit contemporary operatic taste. No other of the composer's settings of Metatasio's texts contains as many substitute aria texts as this one does. The cuts and changes in the text made for the 1776 performance of Mysliveček's opera are not attributable. All of Mysliveček's operas are of the serious type in Italian referred to as opera seria that featured the designation dramma per musica in librettos. His setting of Metastasio's Adriano in Siria is one of the finest ever composed in the 18th century.

== Performance history ==
The opera was first performed at the Teatro del Cocomero in Florence on 8 September 1776 as the last dramatic composition he produced for the musical public of that city. The electoral court of Munich intended to engage Mysliveček to compose an opera for the carnival season of 1776, but the composer found himself unable to travel due to the effects of syphilis. He remained in Florence for an extra year but made remarkable use of his time. He was able to see productions of his new oratorio Isacco, figura del redentore (perhaps his greatest composition) during Lent of 1776 and the opera Adriano in Siria in the autumn. He also came into contact with the Florentine music publisher Ranieri del Vivo, who published a number of his orchestral works, including a collection of his symphonies that constituted the first anthology of symphonies ever published in Italy. The opera was very successful, in particular the music written for the tenor singer Giovanni Ansani, whose aria "Leon piagato a morte" was widely disseminated in manuscript form in the 18th century. The cast was exactly the same as for the opera La disfatta di Dario by Giovanni Paisiello performed during the same autumn operatic season in Florence. Mysliveček's friend and close professional associate, the renowned castrato Tommaso Guarducci, was somehow persuaded to abandon a professed retirement from the stage to appear in Mysliveček's Adriano in Siria. Indeed, Guarducci had not appeared in an operatic role since he participated in a production of Mysliveček's La Nitteti in Bologna in the spring of 1770 (along with Vincenzo Manfredini's Armida). He had appeared in three of Mysliveček's oratorios in Florence between 1771 and 1776, however, and many concerts. Mysliveček also provided Guarducci with an outstanding aria perfectly matched to the capabilities of his voice, "Dopo il tuo sguardo, ingrata" in Act I.

Mysliveček's Adriano in Siria was soon revived in Pavia and Perugia, in each case with a major star included in the cast. The performance in Perugia during the carnival operatic season was graced by Tommaso Guarducci, who repeated the role of Farnaspe that he sang in the Florence production. Since Perugia belonged to the Papal States, an all-male cast was required (the 18th-century popes prohibited women from appearing in operas performed in many of the cities under their control, including Rome). The prima donna in the Pavia production in spring of 1777 was Giuseppa Maccherini Ansani, wife of Giovanni Ansani, the tenor who appeared as Osroa in the original production in Florence. The magnificent aria in Act II, scene 2, of the Florence production, "A ritrovar mi chiama", originally sung by Clementina Chiavacci, was replaced by an equally fine aria composed just for Ansani, "Padre, ti lascio, addio."

It is likely that the operatic pasticcio Adriano in Siria performed in Livorno during the carnival season of 1777 also contained some of Mysliveček's music. The cast included Giovanni Ansani from the original cast, plus his wife Giuseppa. No score survives, only the libretto, which only records the participation of "various composers" without specifying any of them. The texts for all the arias from the Mysliveček premiere are included in Ansani's role of Osroa, two of which were set to texts not a part of Metastasio's original libretto. One of the non-Metastasian texts is "Chi della sorte infida", which was used for a special high-profile aria written for Act I of the original production. The Livorno libretto also includes the text "Padre, ti lascio, addio" for the role of Emirena as sung the following spring in Pavia by Giuseppa Maccherini Ansani.

== Roles ==
Roles	Voice type	Premiere cast, 8 September 1776, Teatro del Cocomero, Florence
Adriano, emperor of Rome, in love with Emirena	soprano castrato	Michele Neri
Osroa, king of the Parthians, father of Emirena	tenor	Giovanni Ansani
Emirena, prisoner of Adriano, in love with Farnaspe	soprano	Clementina Chiavacci
Sabina, in love with and betrothed to Adriano	soprano	Lucia Alberoni
Farnaspe, a prince of Parthia, friend and tributary to Osroa, in love with and betrothed to Emirena	soprano castrato	Tommaso Guarducci
Aquilio, a tribune	soprano castrato	Francesco Papi

== Vocal set pieces ==
- Act 1, scene 1 – Aria of Adriano, "Dal labbro, che t'accende"
- Act 1, scene 2 – Aria of Farnaspe, "Cari affanni, amate pene" [a non-Metastasian text]
- Act 1, scene 3 – Aria of Osroa, "Chi della sorte infida" [a non-Metastasian text]
- Act 1, scene 5 - Aria of Farnaspe, "Dopo un tuo sguardo, ingrata"
- Act 1, scene 9 – Aria of Emirena, "Prigionera abbandonata"
- Act 1, scene 11 – Aria of Sabina, "Numi se giusti siete"
- Act 1, scene 13 – Aria of Osroa, "Parto? Resto? Figlia! Amico!" [a non-Metastasian text]
- Act 1, scene 14 – Duet of Farnaspe and Emirena, "Se non ti moro allato" [a non-Metastasian text]
- Act 2, scene 1 – Aria of Aquilio, "Quanto è facil trionfare" [a non-Metastasian text]
- Act 2, scene 2 – Aria of Emirena, "A ritrovar mi chiama" [a non-Metastasian text]
- Act 2, scene 4 – Aria of Adriano, "Fra l'amore, e la ragione" [a non-Metastasian text]
- Act 2, scene 6 – Aria of Emirena, "Che fa il mio bene" [a non-Metastasian text]
- Act 2, scene 6 – Aria of Sabina, "Volga il ciel, felici amanti" [a non-Metastasian text]
- Act 2, scene 7 – Aria of Farnaspe, "Cara se le mie pene" [a non-Metastsian text]
- Act 2, scene 9 – Aria of Osroa, "Leon piagato a morte"
- Act 2, scene 11 – Quartet for Adriano, Emirena, Farnaspe, and Osroa, "Tutti nemici, e rei"
- Act 3, scene 2 – Aria of Adriano, "Barbaro non comprendo"
- Act 3, scene 3 – Aria of Osroa, "Non ritrova un'alma forte"
- Act 3, scene 4 – Aria of Farnaspe, "Io ti lascio, e questo addio" [a non-Metastasian text]
- Act 3, scene 5 – Aria of Emirena, "Ah che mancar mi sento" [a non-Metastasian text]
- Act 3, scene 7 – Chorus, "S'oda, Augusto, infin sull'etra"

== Recording ==
The aria "Barbaro non comprendo" has been recorded by Max Emanuel Cenčić with the Orquestra Barocca de Sevilla, George Petrou, conductor, in the anthology Venezia, released by Virgin Classics in 2013.
