= Piramo e Tisbe =

Opera intermezzo by Johann Adolph Hasse

- Opera by Johann Adolph Hasse
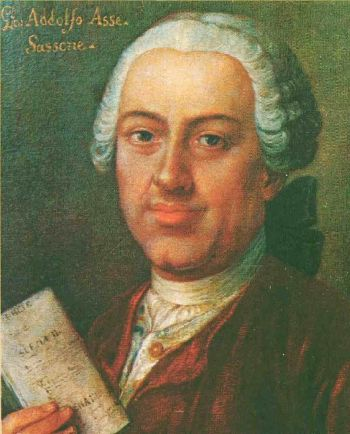
- The opera's composer, Johann Adolph Hasse
- Librettist: Marco Coltellini
- Premiere: Autumn, 1768; Vienna

Piramo e Tisbe is an opera in two acts, described by its composer as an intermezzo tragico, by Johann Adolf Hasse to a libretto by Marco Coltellini.

Piramo e Tisbe is based on the story of the lovers Pyramus and Thisbe as told in Ovid's Metamorphoses. The same story is parodied in Shakespeare's Midsummer Night's Dream, and this comic version of it forms the basis of the 1745 opera Pyramus and Thisbe by John Frederick Lampe, but Coltellini's libretto is a straightforward sentimental tragedy, in which the two eponymous lovers kill themselves, (as does Tisbe's father, who blames himself, having previously forbidden their love).

Piramo e Tisbe is more elaborately composed than Hasse's other operas, with accompanied recitatives and arias which are thorough-composed, that is, not merely strophic settings. Hasse wrote to a friend that he rated it "amongst the best works I have written".

== Performance history ==
Piramo e Tisbe was first performed in the autumn of 1768 at an as yet unidentified estate outside Vienna. The work was revised and performed at the theatre of the Laxenburg Palace of that city in September 1770. Its first American performance was in 2003 at the Bloomington Early Music Festival in Indiana.

== Roles ==
| Role | Voice type | Premiere cast, 1768 (Conductor:) |
|---|---|---|
| The father | tenor | |
| Piramo | soprano | |
| Tisbe | soprano | |

== Recordings ==
- Capella Clementina, cond. Helmut Müller-Brühl; Barbara Schlick, Suzanne Gari, Michel Lecocq (Koch-Schwann, 1984)
- La Stagione Orchestra (Frankfurt), cond. Michael Schneider; Barbara Schlick, Ann Monoyios, Wilfried Jochens (Capriccio, 1995)
- San Rocco Academy Orchestra (Venice), cond. Mario Merigo; Marina Bolgan, Svetlana Svorodova, Emanuele Giannino (Mondo Musica, 2000)
- Akademie für Alte Musik Berlin, cond. Bernhard Forck; Anett Fritsch, Roberta Mameli, Jeremy Ovenden (Harmonia Mundi 2025)
