= Caterina Gabrielli =

Italian coloratura singer (1730–1796)

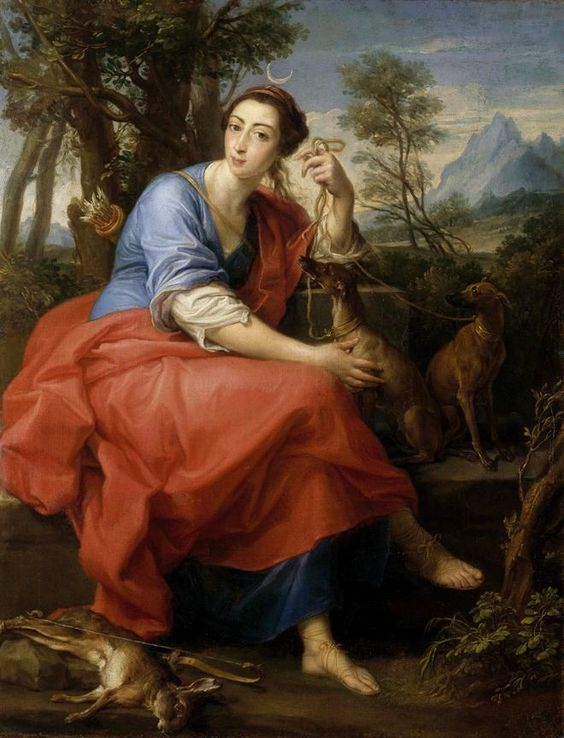
Portrait of Gabrielli as Diana, painted 1751 by Pompeo Batoni

Caterina Gabrielli (12 November 1730 – 16 February or 16 April 1796), born Caterina Fatta, was an Italian coloratura singer. She was the most important soprano of her age. A woman of great personal charm and dynamism, Charles Burney referred to her as "the most intelligent and best-bred virtuosa" that he had ever encountered. The excellence of her vocal artistry is reflected in the fact that she was able to secure long-term engagements in three of the most prestigious operatic centers in her day outside of Italy (Vienna, St. Petersburg, and London).

== Biography ==
Caterina Gabrielli was the daughter of a cook in the service of prince Gabrielli, in Rome. With the support of the prince, she studied with García and Porpora and at the L'Ospedaletto conservatory in Venice, and as a sign of gratitude she decided to assume her patron's surname as her stage name. Her humble roots were remembered by audiences in her nickname La cochetta ("little cook"), which was actually recorded in the librettos published for her early appearances at the Teatro San Moisè in Venice during the 1754–55 operatic season.

No operatic roles are verifiable for Gabrielli before this same distinguished season of singing in Venice in 1754–55. She was then hired by the imperial court of Vienna and sang in a series of dramatic works of various types written by Christoph Willibald von Gluck: La danza (1755), L'innocenza giustificata (1755), and Il re pastore (1756). She also appeared in an opera (Le cacciatrici amanti of 1755) and two sacred works of Georg Christoph Wagenseil: Gioas re ti Giuda (1755) and Il roveto di Mosè (1756). She flourished in Italy for the remainder of the 1750s, with notable appearances in particular at the Teatro Regio Ducale in Milan.

In 1760, Gabrielli returned to Vienna to appear in Gluck's serenata Tetide, Giuseppe Scarlatti's opera Issipile, and Johann Adolf Hasse's opera Alciade al Bivio. A second return to Italy brought even greater renown, including momentous appearances at the Teatro San Carlo in Naples, the most prestigious venue for Italian serious opera in Europe. These performances took place between 1763 and 1767 in works by Pietro Guglielmi, Antonio Sacchini, Johann Christian Bach, Niccolò Piccinni, and Josef Mysliveček. In 1762, she had a short-lived affair with Philip, Duke of Parma.

It was in 1767 that Gabrielli created the stunning role of Argene in Josef Mysliveček's opera Il Bellerofonte in Naples, thereby assisting the composer's meteoric breakthrough to the upper echelon of operatic masters in Italy. But while the reception of Mysliveček's Il Bellerofonte led to eight more engagements at the Teatro San Carlo up to 1779, Gabrielli's overwhelming success in the same opera was met with a lifetime ban imposed by King Ferdinand IV of Naples, who strenuously objected to her attempts to cultivate love affairs with prominent nobles at his court. In spite of her enormous fame, she would never set foot in Naples again. At first, she found a series of alternative engagements in Turin and Palermo. In the period 1772–75, she was employed at the imperial court of St. Petersburg (where her behavior was also considered scandalous by the Empress Catherine the Great) with Francesca Gabrielli. She appeared in Traetta's operas Antigona (1772), Amore e Psiche (1773) and Lucio Vero (1774). She also sang several aria concerts with orchestral accompaniment at the court. In 1775, she moved to London because the director of imperial theaters in St. Petersburg was unwilling to pay what her future employers in London had promised.

During her last period of activity in Italy, in the title role of Mysliveček's Armida, performed in Milan during carnival of 1780 as one of the earliest operas produced at La Scala, she was forced to interrupt her performances in order to give birth to a baby daughter, the identity of whose father remains unknown. She also suffered the indignities of having to substitute arias by Giuseppe Sarti for the ones provided for her by Mysliveček and being taunted for her age by the Milanese audience. Although Gabrielli and Mysliveček were close artistic collaborators at times, there is no documentation to support reports that they were romantically involved; the earliest mention of a love affair with Mysliveček is found in the article about Mysliveček in the fifth edition of the Grove Dictionary of Music and Musicians (1954), without mention of any such liaison in the article about Gabrielli. She was actually closer to the composer Traetta, who was probably responsible for having her brought to St. Petersburg.

After her last known operatic appearances in Venice in 1782, she retired to Bologna, where she died in 1796.

The singer Francesca Gabrielli (born ca. 1735) was probably her sister. She frequently traveled with Caterina and sometimes appeared in lesser roles in the same operas that featured Caterina as the prima donna.

== In Film ==
Gabrielli is prominently portrayed as a temperamental diva in the film Il Boemo (2022), a biopic based on the life of the composer Josef Mysliveček directed by Petr Václav. In this film, Gabrielli is portrayed by the Italian actress Barbara Ronchi with singing dubbed by the Slovak soprano Simona Houda-Šaturová.

== Operatic roles ==
- Ermione in Antigona by Baldassare Galuppi (Venice, 1754)
- Emira in Solimano by Domenico Fischietti (Venice, 1755)
- Ermione in Astianatte by Antonio Gaetano Pampani (Venice, 1755)
- Dafne in Le cacciatrici amanti by Georg Christoph Wagenseil (Laxenburg, 1755; Vienna, 1756)
- Claudia in L'innocenza giustificata by Christoph Willibald von Gluck
- Elisa in Il re pastore by Christoph Willibald von Gluck
- Lisinga in L’eroe cinese by Gaetano Piazza (Milan, 1758)
- Ipermestra in Ipermestra by Baldassare Galuppi (Milan, 1758)
- Beroe in the pasticcio La Nitteti (Genoa, 1758)
- Dircea in Demofoonte by Baldassare Galuppi (Padua, 1758)
- Dircea in Demofoonte by Johann Adolph Hasse (Naples, 1758)
- Fulvia in Ezio by Gaetano Latilla (Naples, 1758)
- Dircea in Demofoonte by Antonio Ferrandini (Milan, 1759)
- Cleofide in Alessandro nell’Indie by Ignaz Holzbauer (Milan, 1759)
- Aricia in Ippolito ed Aricia by Tommaso Traetta (Parma, 1759)
- Vitellia in La clemenza di Tito by Baldassare Galuppi (Turin, 1760)
- Lavinia in Enea nel Lazio by Tommaso Traetta (Turin, 1760; Vienna, 1761)
- Telaire in I tindaridi by Tommaso Traetta (Parma, 1760)
- Issipile in L'Issipile by Giuseppe Scarlatti (Vienna, 1760)
- Edonide in Alcide al Bivio by Johann Adolph Hasse (Vienna, 1760)
- Cleonice in Demetrio by Baldassare Galuppi (Padua, 1761)
- Zenobia in Zenobia of Tommaso Traetta (Lucca, 1761)
- Cleonice in Demetrio by Giuseppe Ponzo (Turin, 1762)
- Ifigenia in Ifigenia in Aulide by Ferdinando Bertoni (Turin, 1762)
- Cleofide in Alessandro nell'Indie by Tommaso Traetta (Reggio Emilia, 1762)
- Fulvia in Ezio by Giuseppe Scarlatti (Lucca, 1762)
- Emirena in Adriano in Siria by Giuseppe Colla (Milan, 1763)
- Didone in Didone abbandonata by Tommaso Traetta (Milan, 1763; Naples, 1764)
- Aristea in L’olimpiade by Pietro Guglielmi (Naples, 1763)
- Issipile in the pasticcio Issipile (Naples, 1763)
- Beroe in La Nitetti by Antonio Maria Mazzoni (Naples, 1764)
- Berenice in Lucio Vero by Antonio Sacchini (Naples, 1764; Naples, 1766)
- Marzia in Catone in Utica by Johann Christian Bach (Naples, 1764)
- Marzia in Cajo Mario by Niccolò Piccinni (Naples, 1765; London, 1776)
- Climene in Il grand Cid by Niccolò Piccinni (Naples, 1766)
- Argene in Il Bellerofonte by Josef Mysliveček (Naples, 1767)
- Clelia in Il trionfo di Clelia by Josef Mysliveček (Turin, 1768)
- Ariene in Creso by Pasquale Cafaro (Turin, 1768)
- Berenice in Vologeso by Nicolò Sacchini (Palermo, 1768)
- Dircea in Demofoonte by Baldassare Galuppi (Palermo, 1768)
- Berenice in the pasticcio Antigono (Palermo, 1769)
- Aristea in the anonymous L’olimpiade (Palermo, 1770)
- Cleonice in the pasticcio Demetrio (Palermo, 1770)
- Antigona in Antigona by Tommaso Traetta (St. Petersburg, 1772)
- Psiche in Amore e Psiche by Tommaso Traetta (St. Petersburg, 1773)
- Berenice in Lucio Vero by Tommaso Traetta (St. Petersburg, 1774)
- Didone in Didone abandonata by Venanzio Rauzzini (London, 1775)
- Emilia in La vestale by Mattia Vento (London, 1776)
- Berenice in an anonymous L'Antigono (London, 1776)
- Armida in the anonymous Armida (Lucca, 1778)
- Armida in Armida by Josef Mysliveček (Milan, 1780)
- Beroe in La Nitteti by Pasquale Anfossi (Venice, 1780)
- Zemira in Zemira by Pasquale Anfossi (Venice, 1782)
- Semiri in Arbace by Giovanni Battista Borghi (Venice, 1782)

Sources: Claudio Sartori, I libretti italiani a stampa dalle origini al 1800, Cuneo (1992–1994), and Corago Singers project, Caterina Gabrielli.
