= Pavla Vykopalová =

Czech soprano (born 1972)

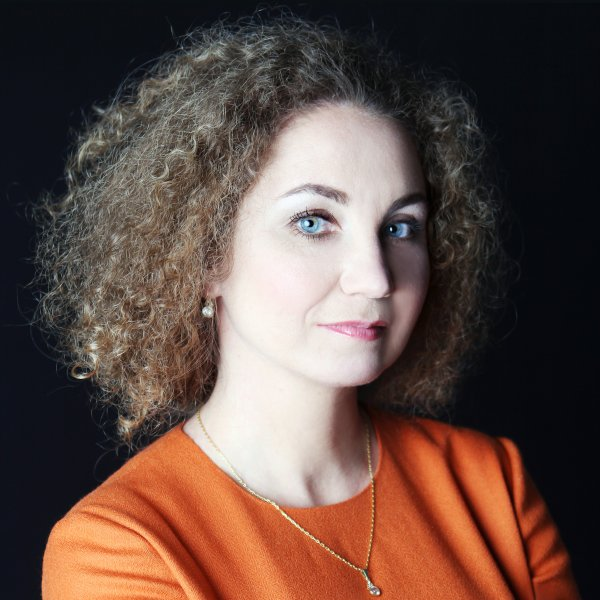
- Vykopalová in 2013
- Born: 23 March 1972; Prague
- Occupations: Operatic mezzo-soprano, then soprano
- Organizations: National Theatre Brno

Pavla Vykopalová (born 23 March 1972) is a Czech operatic soprano.

== Life and career ==
Born in Prague, Vykopalová studied singing at the Prague Conservatory and graduated in 1993; she then became a member of the Prague Philharmonic Choir. She began her soloist career as a mezzo-soprano receiving singing lessons from Lenka Šmídová und since 1997 from Jiří Kotouč. In 2006, she made the transition from mezzo to soprano and has studied further with Marie Urbanová. Vykopalová's repertoire includes roles from Baroque period until the 20th century; beside opera roles she devotes herself to oratorios, cantatas and songs, including contemporary works.

During her studies at the conservatory, Vykopalová performed with the "Opera Mozart" company in Prague; in 1988 she was engaged at the opera of the Plzeň (Pilsen) Theatre. She has appeared from 1999 as a permanent guest artist at the National Theatre in Prague and the Prague State Opera. In 2003, she sang the role of Karolka in Janáček's Jenůfa in a production at the Théâtre du Châtelet in Paris. In 2011/12, she performed the same role in a co-production of three French opera houses – Rennes, Limoges and Reims.

For the role of Mařenka in Smetana's The Bartered Bride, directed by Ondřej Havelka at the National Theatre in Brno, Vykopalová received a nomination for the Czech Thalia Price in 2006. Since January 2009, she has been a member of the opera ensemble at the National Theatre Brno. She received a nomination for the 2012 Thalia Price 2012 for the role of Míla in Janáček's Destiny at the National Theatre in Brno.

== Soprano ==
National Theatre Prague

- Jenůfa (Janáček: Jenůfa)
- Antonia (Offenbach: The Tales of Hoffmann)
- Paskalina (Martinů: The Miracles of Mary)
- Mařenka (Smetana: The Bartered Bride)
- Fiordiligi (Mozart: Così fan tutte)
- Countess (Mozart: Le nozze di Figaro)
- Vitellia (Mozart: La clemenza di Tito)
- Donna Elvira, Zerlina (Mozart: Don Giovanni)
- Pamina (Mozart: The Magic Flute)

State Opera Prague

- Desdemona (Verdi: Otello)
- Rusalka (Dvořák: Rusalka)
- Mimì (Puccini: La bohème)
- Pamina (Mozart: The Magic Flute)
- Rosina (Rossini: Il barbiere di Siviglia)

National Theatre Brno

- Míla (Janáček: Destiny)
- Donna Elvira (Mozart: Don Giovanni)
- Micaëla (Bizet: Carmen)
- Countess (Mozart: Le nozze di Figaro)
- Liu (Puccini: Turandot)
- Jenůfa (Janáček: Jenůfa)
- Countess (Mozart: Le nozze di Figaro)
- Rosalinda (J. Strauss: Die Fledermaus)
- Lauretta (Puccini: Gianni Schicchi)
- Nedda (Leoncavallo: Pagliacci)
- Mařenka (Smetana: The Bartered Bride)
- Julietta (Martinů: Julietta)
- Rosina (Rossini: Il barbiere di Siviglia)

Other opera productions

- Clarice (G. Scarlatti: Dove è amore è gelosia – concert performance; 2009)
- Jenůfa (Janáček: Jenůfa) – Co-production of the Opéra de Rennes, Opéra de Limoges and Reims Opera House (2011/12)

Oratorio and cantata repertoire

- A. Scarlatti: Stabat Mater
- Zelenka: Missa Dei Filii
- F. X. Brixi: Missa pastoralis
- Wanhal: Stabat Mater
- Mozart: Great Mass in C minor
- Mozart: Exsultate, jubilate, K. 165
- Mozart: Requiem
- Dvořák: Stabat Mater
- Dvořák: The Wedding Shirts (Svatební košile, The Spectre's Bride)
- Dvořák: Saint Ludmila
- Dvořák: Mass in D major
- Dvořák: Requiem
- Dvořák: Te Deum
- Fauré: Requiem
- Bernstein: Symphony No. 3 – Kaddish

Song cycles

- Dvořák: Love Songs, Op. 83
- Wiedermann: Spiritual Chants
- Martinů: The New Špalíček, H 288
- Ravel: Shéhérazade
- Shostakovich: From Jewish Folk Poetry, Op. 79
- Pololáník: The Easter Journey

== Former mezzo-soprano roles ==
- Dido (Purcell: Dido and Aeneas – Pilsen Theatre)
- Ruggiero (Händel: Alcina – Concert performance)
- Bertarido (Händel: Rodelinda – Concert performance)
- Rinaldo (Händel: Rinaldo – Concert performance)
- Elisa (G. B. Bononcini: Astarto – Concert performance)
- Vénus (Saint-Saëns: Hélène – Concert performance)
- Alcina (Vivaldi: Orlando furioso – State Opera Prague)
- Prince Orlofsky (J. Strauss: Die Fledermaus – State Opera Prague)
- Fenena (Verdi: Nabucco – State Opera Prague)
- Mercedes (Bizet: Carmen – State Opera Prague)
- Béatrice (Berlioz: Béatrice et Bénédict – State Opera Prag)
- Second Lady (Mozart: The Magic Flute – State Opera Prague; National Theatre Prague)
- Second Wood Sprite (Dvořák: Rusalka – State Opera Prague; National Theatre Prague)
- Dorabella (Mozart: Così fan tutte – Opera Mozart; State Opera Prague; National Theatre Prague)
- Hirte (Puccini: Tosca – National Theatre Prague)
- Záviš (Smetana: The Devil's Wall – National Theatre Prague)
- Cherubino (Mozart: Le nozze di Figaro – National Theatre Prague)
- Minerva (Rameau: Castor et Pollux – National Theatre Prague)
- Karolka (Janáček: Jenůfa – National Theatre Prague; Théâtre du Châtelet, Paris)

== Recordings ==
- 1998 Jakub Jan Ryba: Czech Christmas Mass (Zdena Kloubová, Pavla Vykopalová, Tomáš Černý, Roman Janál; Czech Radio Chamber Choir; Kühn Children Choir; Virtuosi di Praga)
- 2003 Antonín Rejcha: Lenore (Dramatic Cantata after G.&.B.Bürger (1805/1806), Camilla Nylund (Lenore), Pavla Vykopalová (Mother), Corby Welch (Narrator), Vladimir Chmelo (Wilhelm), Prague Chamber Choir
- 2005 Bedřich Antonín Wiedermann works (Irena Chřibková – organ, Pavla Vykopalová – mezzo-soprano); the CD contains unique and until that time not recorded works of a composer and organist (1883–1951) who worked at the St. Jacob's Basilika in Prague.
