= Marco Coltellini =

Italian opera singer

Marco Coltellini (24 May 1724, in Montepulciano – November 1777, in Saint Petersburg) was an Italian opera tenor, librettist and printer.

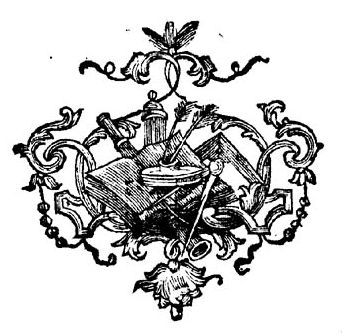
Coltellini's mark (BEIC)

== Biography ==
Coltellini embarked on a career in the Church, but had to leave after fathering four daughters. He set up a printing shop in Livorno to publish the works of Enlightenment figures such as Francesco Algarotti and Cesare Beccaria. Coltellini was very interested in opera and made the acquaintance of Metastasio (the leading librettist of opera seria) as well as Christoph Willibald Gluck, Ranieri de' Calzabigi and Giacomo Durazzo, who were involved in the reform of Italian opera.

In 1763, Coltellini succeeded Metastasio as the Imperial Poet at the Court of Vienna. He provided libretti for Gluck, Hasse (Piramo e Tisbe) and Salieri, as well as revising Carlo Goldoni's La finta semplice so it could be set by Mozart. His collaboration with Traetta, Ifigenia in Aulide (1763), developed the operatic innovations of Gluck's Orfeo ed Euridice.
In 1768, he wrote the libretto for Giuseppe Scarlatti's opera Dove è amore è gelosia, which was premiered at the newly refurbished theatre in Český Krumlov Castle for the wedding celebration of Johann I, Prince of Schwarzenberg, the eldest son of Prince Joseph I Adam of Schwarzenberg, in which Coltellini himself sang the role of Patrizio, one of the characters of the opera.

Coltellini was dismissed from the post in 1772 after one of his satires angered the Empress Maria Theresia, and he accepted the job of official librettist for the Imperial Theatre in Saint Petersburg, Russia. Here he provided texts for Giovanni Paisiello and Traetta (Antigona). He again fell into disgrace and his sudden death was rumoured to be the result of poisoning.

== Sources ==
- Booklet notes to Christophe Rousset's recording of Traetta's opera Antigona (Decca, 2000)
