= Revolving auditorium =

Seating area that can be mechanically rotated

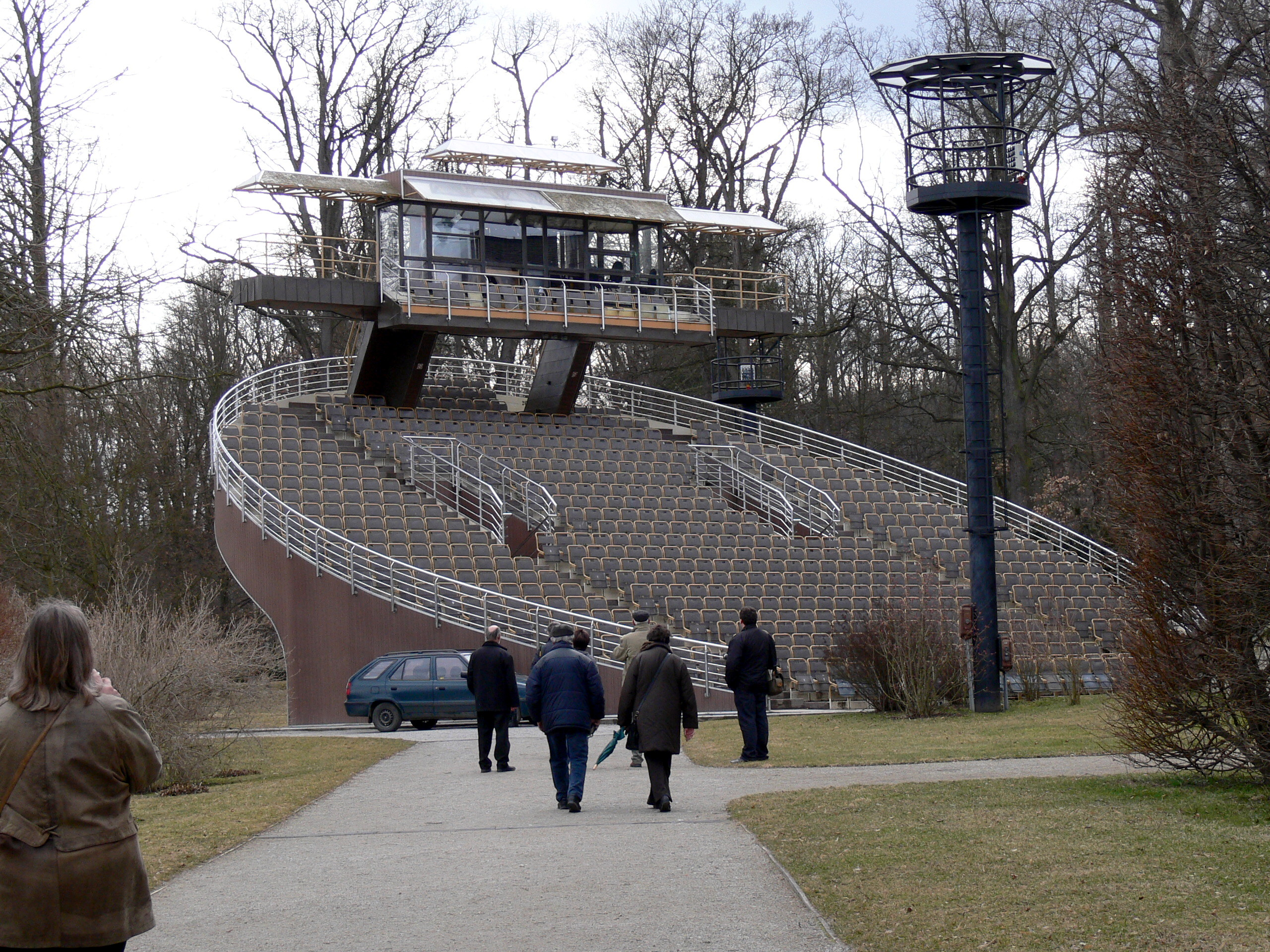
Český Krumlov revolving auditorium

A revolving auditorium is a mechanically controlled seating area within a theatre which can be rotated in order to manipulate the change of scenery and stage sets during the performance. Revolving auditoriums are favoured by open-air theatres in particular, because they are ideally suited for the use of natural scenery as an integral part of the set.

The first revolving auditoriums were built in 1959 in Finland and the Czech Republic (then Czechoslovakia), respectively. The Finnish auditorium Pyynikki Summer Theatre in Tampere, was the first of its kind to be powered by electrical machinery. The Revolving Theatre Český Krumlov in the Baroque gardens of Český Krumlov Castle in South Bohemia at first required 40 people to power its movements, and in 1960 human power was replaced by an electric motor.

Other revolving auditorium was built in Närpes in 1966, a smaller revolving auditorium from 1983 is also found in Týn nad Vltavou and a smaller indoor revolving auditorium in the Boulevard theatre was opened in London in 2019.

At the time of its construction in 1992, the Irish theatre Celtworld contained the largest revolving auditorium in Europe, it was however closed in 1995.

== See also ==
- Revolving stage
- Stagecraft
