= L'innocenza giustificata =

Opera by Christoph Willibald Gluck

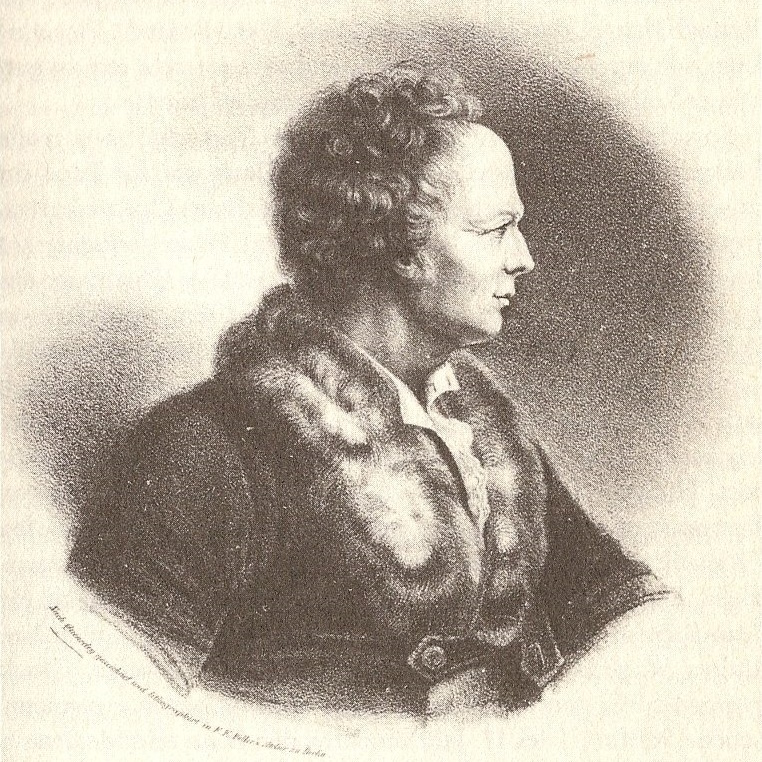
Portrait of Christoph Willibald Gluck, ca. 1750

L'innocenza giustificata (Innocence Justified) is an opera by the composer Christoph Willibald Gluck. It takes the form of a festa teatrale in one act. The Italian-language libretto combines recitatives by Giacomo Durazzo with arias by Pietro Metastasio. The opera premiered on 8 December 1755 at the Burgtheater in Vienna.

== Roles ==
Cast	Voice type	Premiere cast
Claudia, a vestal virgin	soprano	Caterina Gabrielli
Valerio, a Roman consul	tenor	Carlo Carlani
Flaminia, Claudia's sister, priestess of the goddess Vesta	soprano	Marianna Beneventi
Flavio, a Roman knight	soprano castrato	Tommaso Guarducci
Chorus: Roman senators, knights, lictors, people

== Recordings ==
- L'innocenza giustificata María Bayo (Claudia), Veronica Cangemi (Flavio), Andreas Karasiak (Valerio), Marina De Liso (Flaminia), ChorWerk Ruhr, Cappella Coloniensis, conducted by Christopher Moulds (Deutsche Harmonia Mundi, 2004)

== Sources ==
- Booklet notes to the Moulds recording by Ingo Dorfmüller
- Holden, Amanda The Viking Opera Guide (Viking, 1993), page 373.
- Gluck-Gesamtausgabe. L'innocenza giustificata. Institut für Musikwissenschaft, Goethe-Universität
