= Celtworld =

Educational amusement park in Ireland

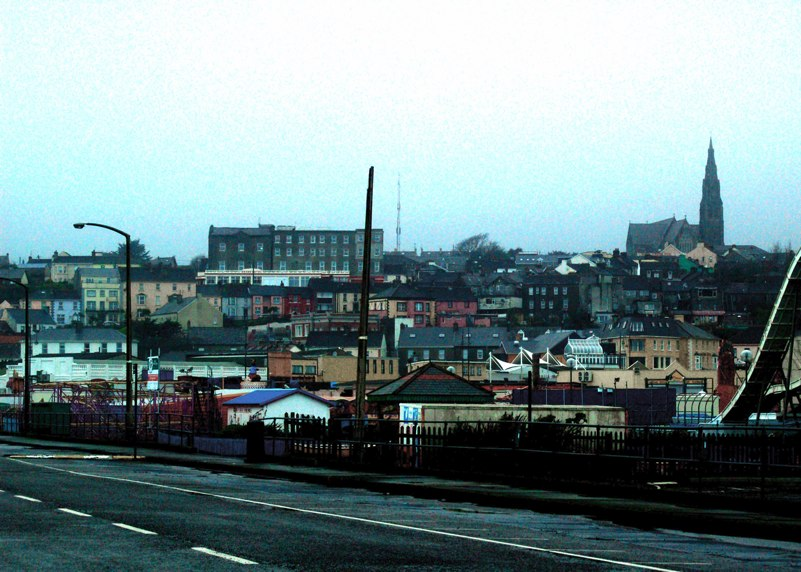
- Tramore Waterfront, close to the former Celtworld site
- Interactive map of Celtworld
- Location: Tramore, County Waterford
- Coordinates: 52.1612°N 7.1476°W
- Opened: May 1992
- Closed: September 1995
- Operated by: Celtworld Limited

Attractions
- Total: 1

Celtworld was an educational amusement park, heritage interpretation centre and tourist attraction in Tramore, County Waterford, Ireland. It operated from 1992 to 1995 before closing due to financial difficulties.

== Development ==
=== Funding ===
The total start-up cost for the project was more than £4.5 million (approximately €5.7 million). With building costs of between £90 and £110 per square foot, it was reputed to be the most expensive construction project in Ireland. Tramore Fáilte, an arm of the South East Regional Tourism Organisation, provided £737,000 toward start-up costs, in addition to term loans and leasing arrangements of approximately £575,000. The project also attracted a European Union Structure Fund Grant of £1.81 million.

Private sector investment of £1.5 million was provided by Vectravision, Kentz, and British firm International Tourism Projects Ltd. Bank loans provided a further £600,000 of capital. A further £230,000-£250,000 was funded by 63 Business Expansion Scheme (BES) investors, which included employees of the Bank of Ireland, Kentz, and Tramore Fáilte. There were 67 investors in total. The 2.5-acre site was purchased from Tramore Fáilte for £400,000. The company was incorporated as Celtworld Limited on 30 November 1990, opening in May 1992 with 15 full-time and 15 part-time employees.

=== Design ===
The Art Deco interior was designed by artist Jim Fitzpatrick. The building was planned as a wet-weather attraction. It was clad with aluminium and was not air conditioned, which led to uncomfortable conditions in warm weather.

== Features ==
=== Theatre ===
Celtworld's main feature was a 25-minute show which involved a revolving auditorium, the largest such theatre in Europe at that time. Visual effects included animated artwork, computer-generated imagery, lasers, holograms, and animatronics. It was presented as a "Crystal Time Chamber" which allowed visitors to travel back to Celtic times. Every turn of the revolving theatre brought visitors to 1 of 6 presentations, which involved a range of mythical and legendary characters such as a daughter of Noah, Tuatha Dé Danann, Fomorians, Partholón, Lugh, Balor, and Cú Chulainn. The experience was narrated by Tuan mac Cairill. Historical figures such as vikings and Saint Patrick were also included.

- Presentation 1 – Cessair and Fir Bolg from Lebor Gabála Érenn
- Presentation 2 – Fir Bolg fighting Tuatha Dé Danann
- Presentation 3 – Battle between Lugh and Balor
- Presentation 4 – The childhood of Cú Chulainn
- Presentation 5 – Táin Bó Cúailnge
- Presentation 6 – Fionn mac Cumhaill and the Fianna

=== Otherworld ===
After the theatre show, visitors entered the interactive Celtic Otherworld exhibition. This area included quizzes, information on women in Irish mythology, ogham stones, Aos Sí, an £18,000 replica Book of Kells, and an artificial tree with talking animatronic human heads. The exit was via a gift shop.

== Closure ==
Celtworld experienced early trading difficulties and a financial consultant was appointed to review the company. 270,000 people were expected to attend each year but the project attracted less than 50% of its target. It received a loan from Bord Fáilte in late 1993 but business did not improve. Celtworld closed in September 1995 with losses of over £4 million. More than £2 million had been spent on set-up, promotion, and consultancy fees. The centre's failure has been attributed in part to its unchanging audiovisual presentations, which failed to attract adequate repeat visitors. Bord Fáilte Director General Matt McNulty claimed that the project's failure was due to its design as a wet-weather facility. Its opening season saw unseasonably warm, dry weather which led to low attendance.

Its failure led to discussion in Dáil Éireann, the Irish parliament, where Kathleen Lynch questioned the Minister for Tourism and Trade, Enda Kenny about its closure.

== Allegations by Prime Time and Marketplace ==
The RTÉ One current affairs television shows Prime Time and Marketplace made a series of allegations around the business. Specifically, according to the programmes, business expansion scheme (BES) investors were unclear about the existence of significant contracts between affiliated businesses of the key shareholders and Celtworld. The shows claimed that Tramore Fáilte, a Bord Fáilte subsidiary, had inflated the value of the land it provided, implying that Tramore Fáilte had a deliberate strategy to obtain a substantial shareholding for little money. The programmes also claimed that a separate report to Bord Fáilte revealed that £100,000 of the £265,000 in expenses expended by Tramore Fáilte on behalf of Celtworld—for which Tramore Fáilte effectively earned shares—did not relate to the Celtworld project. Bobby Molloy questioned Minister Kenny over the closure and allegations which had been made.

The Minister denied the accusations, saying the assertions were untrue because both of the relevant material contracts were specifically disclosed in the BES placement document and were open for inspection, The land in question was professionally assessed, and the BES placement document made explicit mention of this appraisal, the Minister noting that it was not recognized as acceptable spending and hence had no influence on the EU grant aid. According to Bord Fáilte, the matter of the £100,000 was brought up by an impartial consultant it hired to assess the project and was later dismissed as having no merit by the board of Celtworld.

The Minister detailed how plans for business expansion naturally involve some risk. This was mentioned at least three times in the BES placement document, where it was suggested that interested investors seek the counsel of attorneys, accountants, tax advisors, or other relevant experts to aid them in their own commercial evaluation of the project. Bord Fáilte believes that Celtworld did not fail as a result of the concerns expressed on "Marketplace" regarding the internal transactions amongst shareholders. It ultimately failed instead because it was unable to draw in the volume of business required for existence and profitability.

== Aftermath ==
The property was placed on the market with the condition that it could only be used for tourism or leisure activities, which limited its potential sale price. The site went on sale in September 1995 at an asking price of £600,000 and was due to be sold to a Northern Ireland consortium in January 1996 for £475,000. However, by February 1996 the Irish Times reported that the sale had fallen through. A Cork-based property developer, Mr P J Hegarty, then bought the location in April 1996 for £442,500. In 1997, the site was sold to Butlin's Mosney owner Phelim McCloskey for £380,000. McCloskey developed a robotic dinosaurs exhibit which closed after less than a year.

A European Commission investigation was due to report in 1997 but as of 1999 had not been completed. In 1999, McCloskey obtained planning permission for 30 short-term holiday apartments on the site. Permission was granted by An Bord Pleanála, controversially over-ruling a Waterford County Council decision to reject an original proposal for 36 apartments. In 2000, Ambience Catering Limited, led by Vince Power, purchased the site for "just under £50,000" and developed a 20,000 square feet music venue named South with a capacity of 2,200 guests, at a cost of €3 million. The venue opened in 2001 but closed soon afterwards. Celtworld Limited was dissolved on 15 July 2005.

The site was sold in May 2006 to Volute Properties Limited, who received planning permission for a mixed-use development with Dunnes Stores as anchor tenants. This proposal fell through and the building was demolished in 2008. By 2020, it had been redeveloped as an Aldi supermarket.

== Media and popular culture ==
Celtworld was featured in the 1994 RTÉ Television short drama "Gypsies".
