= Dove è amore è gelosia =

1768 opera by Giuseppe Scarlatti

Dove è amore è gelosia is an opera (intermezzo giocoso) in two acts composed by Giuseppe Scarlatti to an Italian libretto by Marco Coltellini. It was originally written for the wedding celebration of Johann Nepomuk Anton, the eldest son and heir-apparent of Prince Joseph I Adam of Schwarzenberg, and premiered at the theatre in the Český Krumlov Castle in Český Krumlov on 24 July 1768.

The first modern revival of Dove è amore è gelosia was staged at the Baroque Theatre of Český Krumlov Castle, the site of its original premiere, on 9 September 2011. This performed was recorded and released in DVD and blu-ray by Opus Arte.

The music to one of Patrizio's arias, "A che serve intisichire" has been noted to share a degree of similarity with Cherubino's aria, "Non so più cosa son" from Mozart's Le Nozze di Figaro, which was composed 18 years later.

== Roles ==
Role	Voice type	Premiere cast, 24 July 1768 Conductor: Giuseppe Scarlatti
Clarice, The Marquise, lover of Orazio	soprano	Princess Maria Theresia of Schwarzenberg
Vespetta, The marquise's maid, lover of Patrizio	soprano	Antonia Scarlatti
Orazio, The Count, lover of Clarice	tenor	Count Salburg of Linz
Patrizio, The count's servant, lover of Vespetta	tenor	Marco Coltellini

== Selected recordings ==
DVD - Lenka Máčiková, Aleš Briscein, Kateřina Kněžiková, Jaroslav Březina, Schwarzenberg Court Orchestra, Vojtěch Spurný. Opus Arte, 2011 88 minutes
