= La Nitteti =

Opera by Josef Mysliveček

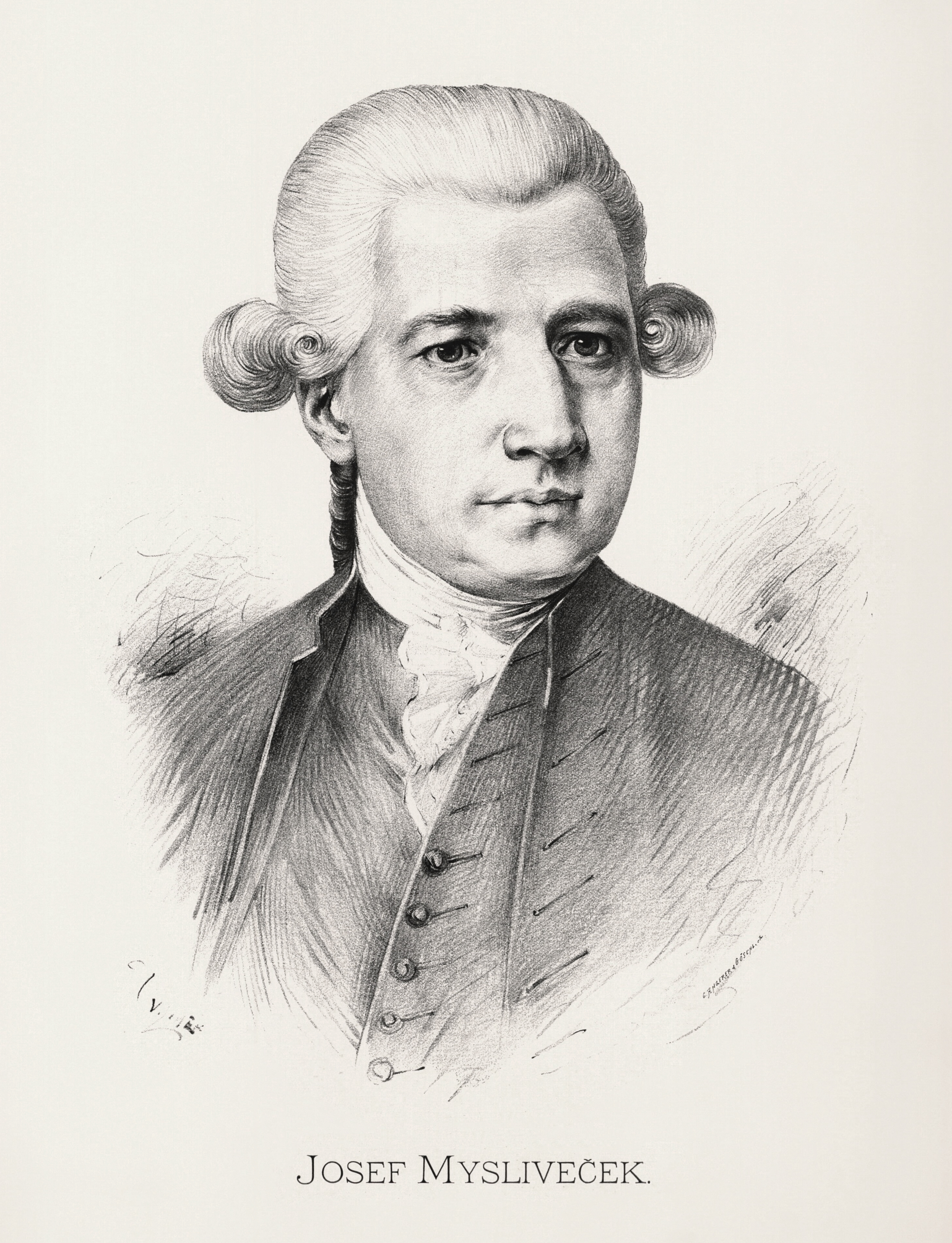
Josef Mysliveček

La Nitteti is an 18th-century Italian opera in 3 acts by the Czech composer Josef Mysliveček. It was composed to a libretto by the Italian poet Metastasio that was first performed in 1756, one of the newer (and less popular) of the Metastasian librettos in Mysliveček's day. For a performance in the 1770s, it would only be expected that a libretto of such age would be abbreviated and altered to suit contemporary operatic taste. This opera contains more substitutions of original aria texts than any other Mysliveček setting of a Metastasian libretto. The cuts and changes in the text made for the 1770 performance of Mysliveček's opera are not attributable. All of Mysliveček's operas are of the serious type in Italian language referred to as opera seria that would usually feature the designation dramma per musica in librettos.

== Performance history ==
The opera was first performed at the Teatro Nuovo Pubblico in Bologna on 29 April 1770, a month after Mysliveček first made the acquaintance of Wolfgang Amadeus Mozart and his father Leopold the previous month in the same city. From the correspondence of the Mozart family, it is known that the singer Caterina Gabrielli was engaged originally to be the prima donna for the production, but she did not come up from Palermo as planned, to the disappointment of the Bolognese. Her replacement, Clementina Spagnuoli, was a much less distinguished singer. Another notable singer, the castrato Tommaso Guarducci, met Mysliveček for the first time during the course of the preparations for this production, then became close professional associates for several years afterward. The production was a success. It was revived for the carnival operatic season of 1777 for the Teatro Nuovo in Pavia, the same theater that first opened in 1773 with a performance of Mysliveček's first setting of Metastasio's libretto Demetrio. Two arias from Nitteti, "Povero cor, tu palpiti," and "Se la cagion saprete" received modern premieres at a concert of the Mozartists, with Ian Page conducting, at Cadogan Hall in London on 7 March 2020. .

== Connection with Mozart ==
During the summer of 1770, the young Mozart was staying with his father in Bologna and working on his first opera for Italy, Mitridate, re di Ponto, which was supposed to be performed in Milan later that year. Mysliveček was also staying in Bologna that summer and was a frequent visitor to the Mozart household according to letters of Mozart's father. There is no question that Wolfgang studied Mysliveček's score for La Nitteti closely and picked up compositional expertise and musical motives as a result. The use of Mysliveček's musical motives is seen most clearly by comparing Mysliveček's aria "Se la cagione saprete" with Mozart's aria "Lungi da te". A detailed comparison of the overture and opening arias of Mysliveček's La Nitteti and Mozart's Mitridate has been provided by Daniel E. Freeman.

== Roles ==
Roles	Voice type	Premiere, 29 April 1770, Teatro Nuovo Pubblico, Bologna
Amasi, king of Egypt	tenor	Salvatore Casetti
Sammete, son of Amasi, in love with Beroe	soprano castrato	Tommaso Guarducci
Beroe, a shepherdess	soprano	Clementina Spagnuoli
Nitteti, an Egyptian princess secretly in love with Sammete	soprano	Daniella Mienci
Amenofi, ruler of Cyrene, friend of Sammete, secretly in love with Nitteti	soprano castrato	Marcello Pompili
Bubaste, captain of the royal guard	bass	Giacomo Panato

== Vocal set pieces ==
Act I, scene 1 – Accompanied recitative for Amenofi and Sammete, "E Sammete non torna"
Act I, scene 1 – Aria of Sammete, "Sono in mar"
Act I, scene 2 – Aria of Amenofi, "Se il labbro nol dice"
Act I, scene 3 – Aria of Nitteti, "Tu sai che amante io sono"
Act I, scene 4 – Aria of Sammete, "Care luci nel mirarvi tal dolcezza" [a non-Metastasian text]
Act I, scene 5 – Aria of Beroe, "Tra l'affanno e la speranza" [a non-Metastasian text]
Act I, scene 8 – Aria of Amasi, "Tutte fin or dal cielo"
Act I, scene 10 – Duet for Beroe and Sammete, "Sì, ti credo, amato bene"

Act II, scene 1 – Accompanied recitative for Beroe, "Povero cor, tu palpiti"
Act II, scene 5 – Aria of Amasi, "Puoi vantar le tue ritorte"
Act II, scene 7 – Aria of Beroe, "Ah, non temer ben mio" [a non-Metastasian text]
Act II, scene 8 – Aria of Bubaste, "Tuona talor minaccia" [a non-Metastasian text]
Act II, scene 9 – Aria of Sammete, "Se la cagion saprete" [a non-Metastasian text]
Act II, scene 10 – Aria of Amenosi, "Da voi cari lumi" [a non-Metastasian text]
Act II, scene 11 – Aria of Nitteti, "Se fra gelosi sdegni"
Act II, scene 12 – Accompanied recitative for Beroe and Sammete, "Ma dove, oh Dio, mi guidi?"
Act II, scene 13 – Trio for Beroe, Sammete, and Amasi, "Guardami, padre amato" [a non-Metastasian text]

Act III, scene 3 – Aria of Amasi, "Taci, o cor, in questo petto" [a non-Metastasian text]
Act III, scene 5 – Aria of Beroe, "Bramai di salvarti"
Act III, scene 7 – Aria of Sammete, "Se consolarmi"

== Recording ==
One aria from Mysliveček's La Nitteti is available in a collection recorded by the Czech soprano Zdena Kloubová: "Ah, non temer ben mio." The recording is Panton 81 1044–2231 (1992) with the Benda Chamber Orchestra, Miroslav Hrdlička, conductor.
