= Antigona (Traetta) =

Italian-language opera by Tommaso Traetta

Antigona (Antigone) is an opera in three acts in Italian by the composer Tommaso Traetta. The libretto, by Marco Coltellini, is based on the tragedy Antigone by Sophocles.

== Performance history ==
Antigona received its premiere at the Imperial Theatre, Saint Petersburg on 11 November 1772.

== Roles ==
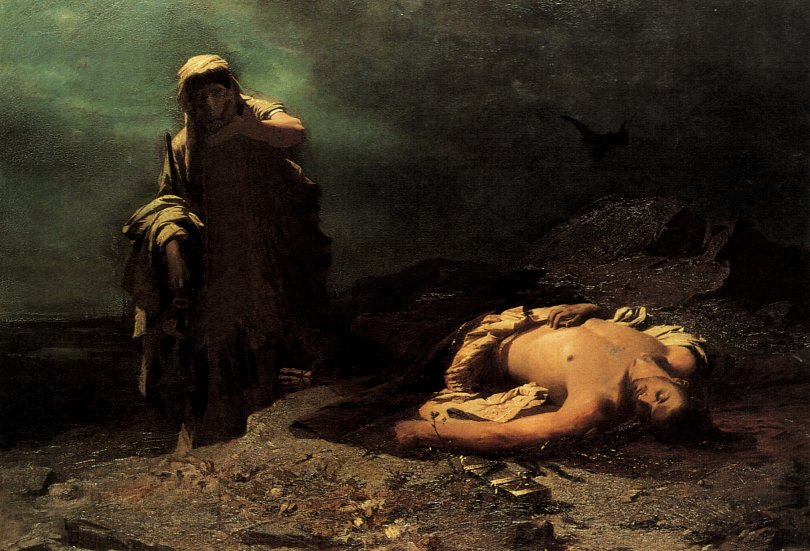
Antigone by Nikiforos Lytras (1865)

Roles, voice types, premiere cast
| Role | Voice type | Premiere, 1772 |
|---|---|---|
| Antigona (Antigone) | soprano | Caterina Gabrielli |
| Ismene | soprano | Francesca Gabrielli |
| Creonte (Creon) | tenor | Antonio Prati |
| Emone (Haemon) | castrato | Angiolo Monanni |
| Adrasto (Adrastus) | tenor | Antonio Amati |

== Synopsis ==
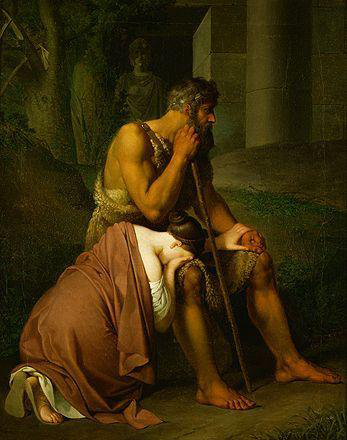
Oedipe et Antigone by Johann Peter Krafft (1809)

=== Background ===
The background to the opera is the myth of Oedipus. Oedipus has been expelled from Thebes, the city where he was king, after it was revealed he had killed his father and married his mother. He left four children: Eteocles, Polynices, Antigone and Ismene. Creon, Oedipus' brother-in-law, declares that the vacant throne of Thebes will now be shared by the two sons, Eteocles and Polynices, ruling alternately, but the two have quarrelled. To prevent a war, Creon decrees the two should fight in single combat to decide who will be king.

=== Act 1 ===
Eteocles and Polynices (played by ballet dancers) fight the single combat and kill each other. Adrastus now offers the crown to Creon, who declares that Eteocles shall be buried with full honours. Polynices, however, will be left unburied because he started a war on Thebes when he did not get his way. Polynices' sisters, Antigone and Ismene, are distraught. Antigone resolves to bury her brother in defiance of Creon's decree. Ismene hopes that Creon's son Haemon (who is in love with Antigone) will be able to persuade his father to show mercy to the dead Polynices.

=== Act 2 ===
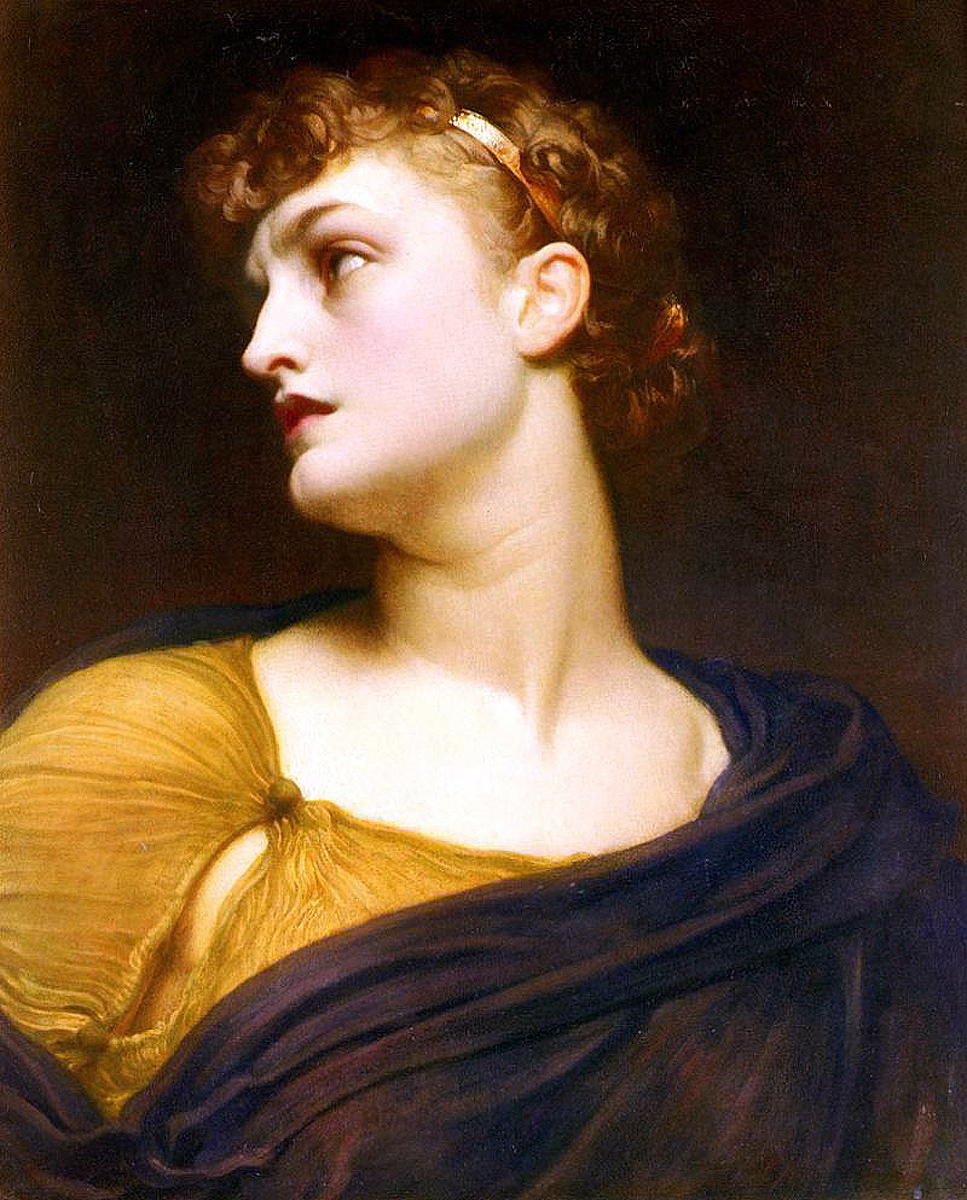
Antigone by Frederic Leighton, 1882

Antigone cremates Polynices by night. Haemon comes to warn her just before Adrastus and his guards arrive. Adrastus realises Creon's orders have been disobeyed. He believes Haemon is the culprit and arrests him. Creon sentences him to death, but Antigone arrives to explain that the cremation is all her own work. Creon condemns her to be walled up alive in a cave.

=== Act 3 ===
Creon and the Thebans watch as Antigone is walled up in the cave. Adrastus brings news that Haemon has apparently committed suicide. Creon hurries back to Thebes. But Haemon has survived and reaches the cave where he intends to die with Antigone. He manages to reach her through a fissure in the rock. He shows the dagger he has brought which will enable them both to have a quick death and avoid slow starvation. At that moment there is a noise as soldiers break down the wall. Creon has repented his action and repealed the death sentence. He asks Antigone and Haemon to forgive his harshness. The opera ends with a marriage ceremony for the two rescued lovers.

== Recording ==
- Antigona – María Bayo, Anna Maria Panzarella, Carlo Vicente Allemano, Laura Polverelli, Gilles Ragon, Les Talens Lyriques, conducted by Christophe Rousset (Decca, 2000)
