= Kentz =

British company

Kentz Corp. Ltd.
- Type: Public limited company
- Industry: Engineering and construction
- Founded: 1919
- Founders: Michael Francis Kent
- Headquarters: St Helier, Jersey
- Key people: Christian Brown (CEO)
- Revenue: $1,657.5 million (2013)
- Operating income: $115.0 million (2013)
- Net income: $74.7 million (2013)
- Number of employees: 14,500 (2014)
- Parent: SNC-Lavalin
- Website: www.kentz.com

Kentz Corp. Ltd. or Kentech or Kent PLC is an engineering and construction business serving clients primarily in the oil and gas, petrochemical and mining and metals sectors.

== History ==
The company was founded by Michael Francis Kent as an electrical contracting business in Clonmel in County Tipperary in 1919. The business was taken over by his brother in 1948, and then by his son Frank in 1963. The business, which had been renamed MF Kent, expanded rapidly during the 1970s and 1980s as it upgraded the Irish telecommunications network. In 1987, it was acquired by Gus Kearney, its general manager, who expanded operations into Singapore, Spain and Africa.

In 1992, the company made heavy losses on the refurbishment of the Museu Nacional d'Art de Catalunya and struggled to survive. Two years later, the Malaysian group, Peremba, stepped in and bought a majority stake in the business, providing much-needed capital.

The company changed its name to Kentz following the purchase. Hugh O'Donnell was appointed chief executive in 2000 and the company was subsequently listed on the Alternative Investment Market in February 2008. Kentz was transferred to the main market of the London Stock Exchange in July 2011. Christian Brown became chief executive in February 2012.

On 23 June 2014, SNC-Lavalin agreed to acquire Kentz for C$2.1 billion ($1.95 billion). The sale was completed on 22 August 2014 with Kentz delisted from the London Stock Exchange.

In 2015, the investment business, Bluewater, acquired a majority stake in the company which, for a brief time, came to be known as Kentech. In 2021, Kentech acquired the oil & gas business of SNC-Lavalin and the new company was branded Kent PLC.

== Operations ==
Kentz has operations in 30 countries around the world, including the Americas, the Middle East, Africa, Australasia, the Far East, Russia and Europe. In 2011, the company employed over 10,500 people globally.

== See also ==
- Celtworld
