= Tommaso Guarducci =

Italian singer

Tommaso Guarducci (c. 1720 – 10 January 1803) was one of the most renowned Italian castrato singers of the 18th century, the interpreter of many starring operatic roles in various musical centers of Europe, most importantly Rome, Naples, London, and Florence.

== Early life and career ==
He was born in Montefiascone, in the Papal States (now in the central Italian province of Viterbo, Lazio) around the year 1720. No details of his early training are known other than a period of study in Bologna at some time with the noted contralto castrato Antonio Bernacchi. His first known operatic role was Dorinda in the pasticcio La Flora in Urbino during the carnival operatic season of 1743. It was very common in 18th-century Italy for castratos to initiate their operatic careers in female roles, particularly in the Papal States, in which females were frequently barred from appearing in operatic roles by the popes, most particularly in Rome (Urbino lay within the boundaries of the Papal States after 1626). Guarducci's appearance in La Flora was received favorably, and it led to an invitation in 1744 by the Congregazione di Santa Cecilia to sing as a soprano at the basilica of Santa Maria Maggiore in Rome. Guarducci's period of activity in Rome at this time is documented up to the year 1749.

Guarducci's distinguished international singing career began in 1750, when the renowned castrato Farinelli (Carlo Broschi) invited him to travel to Madrid to join the musical establishment of King Ferdinand VI. The exact nature of his activities at the royal court of Spain remains unknown. All that is certain is that there is no record of his participation in any operatic productions sponsored by the court. Guarducci left Madrid in 1754 to sing in a production of L’Artaserse by Davide Perez that took place in Lisbon in June. He shared the stage with the great German tenor Anton Raaff, who was resident in Lisbon between 1752 and 1755 as a part of a great period of operatic productions at the Portuguese court sponsored by King Joseph I, a notable opera enthusiast, whose activities as a patron were interrupted by the great Lisbon earthquake of 1 November 1755. Neither Guarducci nor Raaff were present in Lisbon when the earthquake struck. Raaff had moved to Madrid during the summer of 1755, whereas Guarducci left Lisbon or Italy in March of the same year.

== Professional maturity and retirement ==
The remainder of the 1750s brought engagements for Guarducci in three of the most prestigious operatic centers in Europe, first in Vienna during the winter of 1755-56, in which he appeared in Gluck’s opera L'innocenza giustificata. He next appeared in Reggio Emilia in 1756 and Milan for the carnival operatic season of 1757. A very important period of activity for Guarducci began in the summer of 1757, when he made his first appearance at the Teatro San Carlo in Naples, the most prestigious venue in Europe at the time for productions of opera seria. He remained in Naples with minor interruptions until early in 1762, with appearances in two operas each by Johann Adolph Hasse and Johann Christian Bach (the most significant work by the latter Catone in Utica of 1761). From this time until his arrival in London in 1767, Guarducci was itinerant, cast in operatic roles in Florence, Pisa, Siena, Parma, Rome, and Palermo. His appearance in Florence in the opera Artemisia in the spring of 1766 took place early in the reign as Grand Duke of Tuscany of the Archduke Leopold of Austria (later Holy Roman Emperor Leopold II), and shortly after, Guarducci received an appointment from Leopold as a court musician. On 10 May 1766, he appeared in a concert at the Palazzo Pitti, and on 24 July 1766, he participated in a performance of a cantata by Giovanni Battista Borghi sponsored by Leopold's court in the church of San Giovannino degli Scolopi in Florence, the first of many appearances in musical events arranged by the court of Tuscany. His title “virtuoso di S.A.R. il Gran Duca di Toscana” (“musician to His Royal Highness the Grand Duke of Tuscany”), or variants, is first found in the libretto for Johann Christian Bach's opera Carattaco, performed during the carnival season of 1767 in London. From this time, Guarducci's position at the grand ducal court of Tuscany was recorded routinely in the cast lists of librettos until the end of his operatic career in 1777. His court appointment lasted until 1786.

Guarducci's appearances at the King's Theatre, Haymarket (now known as His Majesty's Theatre, London), in 1767 and 1768 may be described as a high point in the singer's career. He appeared with great acclaim in eight productions, one of them, a Sifare with music mainly by Carl Friedrich Abel, a “benefit” in his honor (in the 18th century, a “benefit” musical performance meant that the proceeds were turned over to a musician, not to a charity). Burney also recorded a benefit concert in the spring of 1768 for Guardasoni that featured Niccolò Jommelli’s oratorio Betulia liberata of 1743, and it was also well received. Burney included a brief illustration of Guarducci's famous ability to sing effectively at a soft dynamic: “Guarducci, instead of an opera, had for his benefit this spring the oratorio of Betulia Liberata, set by Jommelli, in which among many admirable compositions, an air of supplication, through which were heard cries of the people in a distant chorus, sung extremely soft, was justly admired for its new and fine effect.”

Other notable operas in which Guarducci appeared in London include Carattaco by Johann Christian Bach (1767), La conquista del Messico by Mattia Vento (1767), and Ifigenia in Aulide by Giovanni Paisiello (1768). It was at this time that Guarducci first came into contact with the English music critic and music historian Charles Burney, who left vivid accounts of his activities. In his A General History of Music, Burney included a special section devoted to Guarducci's period of activity in London in 1767 and 1768, including an eloquent evaluation of his singing style and perceptive remarks about the tastes of the English music public. He described Guarducci as a “tall and awkward figure, inanimate as an actor, and in countenance ill-favoured and morbid; but with all these disadvantages, he was a man of great probity and worth in his private character, and one of the most correct singers I have ever heard”. He continued as follows:

.He was unfortunate in arriving here so soon after [Giovanni] Manzuoli, the impressions of whose great voice and majestic manner of singing had not been effaced by his immediate successor, [Filippo] Elisi. Guarducci's voice, though of much less volume than Manzuoli's, was clear, sweet, and flexible. His shake and intonations were perfect, and by long study and practice he had vanquished all the difficulties of his art, and possessed himself of every refinement of his particular school, as well as of the general vocal embellishments of Italy at this period. Though prejudice ran high against him on his first arrival in London, his merit at length made its way, and his highly polished manner of singing was very much approved and felt by the principal professors and persons of taste and discernment who heard him. He soon discovered that a singer could not captivate the English by tricks or instrumental execution, and told me years after, at Montefiascone in Italy, that the gravity of our taste had been of great use to him. “The English,” says he, “are such friends to the composer, and to simplicity, that they like to hear a melody in its primitive state, undisguised by change or embellishment. Or, if, when repeated, when riffioramenti [“embellishments”] are necessary [meaning in the repeat of the “A” section in an ABA da capo aria or dal segno aria], the notes must be few and well selected, to be honoured with approbation.” Indeed, Guarducci was the plainest and most simple singer, of the first class, I ever heard. All his effects were produced by expression and high finishing, nor did he ever aim at execution. He sung in the English oratorios upon short notice, with very little knowledge of our language, and still less practice in pronouncing it. However, he was well received and well paid. For he had £600 for twelve oratorios, a larger sum than was ever given on a like occasion, till the time of Miss [Elizabeth Ann] Linley.

After returning to Italy from London in 1768 (sometime after the closing of the King's Theatre in London on 30 June), Guarducci made his principal appearances at the Teatro Argentina in Rome during the carnival operatic seasons of 1769 and 1770, his most successful role as Enea in Niccolò Piccinni’s Didone abandonnata. On 25 November 1768, on his way to Rome from Florence, as reported in the Florentine newspaper Gazzetta toscana, Guarducci sang in a concert given at a villa owned by Sir Watkin Williams-Wynn, 4th Baronet, a son of the distinguished British politician Sir Watkin Williams-Wynn, 3rd Baronet. The concert was intended as a tribute for the British diplomat and noted patron of the arts Sir Horace Mann, who represented the Kingdom of Great Britain at the court of Tuscany from 1737 until his death in 1786, between 1767 and 1782 as Envoy Extraordinary. It is entirely unknown whether this activity was a part of efforts to cultivate the large number of British ex-patriates resident in Florence at the time in light of his recent successful appearances in London. It is known, however, that he soon began to associate himself with Earl Cowper, another notable patron of the arts in Florence at the time. The first record of their acquaintance dates from a concert sponsored by Earl Cowper at his residence in Florence on 30 March 1770.

In April 1770, Guarducci appeared in Bologna in La Nitteti by Josef Mysliveček, the beginning of a profitable period of collaboration with that composer. By the time of the première of the opera on 29 April, he had just missed meeting Wolfgang and Leopold Mozart in Bologna, since they were present there at the end of March during the preparations for Mysliveček's opera. Guarducci is documented as being present in Florence as late as 8 April 1770 before arriving in Bologna to appear in La Nitetti. The Mozarts were present in Florence in early April of 1770, but there is no record of an encounter with Guarducci.

Partially as a result of his enormous earnings in London in 1767 and 1768, he had a luxurious villa built in his native city of Montefiascone with a view that overlooked Lake Bolsena. Charles Burney renewed his acquaintance with Guarducci when he visited Montefiascone as part of a tour of Italy detailed in his Present State of Music in France and Italy and noted in a report of the visit dated 18 September 1770 that his villa showed evidence of English interior design. Guarducci informed Burney that he intended to retire from his operatic career permanently:

[On] my way to Rome, I visited Signor Guarducci, who has here built himself a very good house, and fitted it up in the English manner, with great taste. He had already been apprized of my journey into Italy, and received me in the politest manner imaginable. He was so obliging as to let me hear him, in a song of Signor Sacchini's composition, which he sung divinely. His voice, I think, is more powerful then when he was in England, and his taste and expression seem to have received every possible degree of selection and refinement. He is a very chaste performer, and adds but few notes; those few notes, however, are so well chosen, that they produce great effects, and leave the ear thoroughly satisfied. He has a winter-house in Florence, and has built this at Montefiascone, the place of his birth, to retire in summer, and to receive his mother, and his brothers and sisters ... He says he has totally quitted the stage, and intends singing no more in public: this is a loss to Italy, as I find he is now allowed by the Italians the first place among all the singers of the present period; and, at Rome, they still speak of his performance in Piccinni's Didone abbandonata, with rapture ...

Although he told Burney that he had no intention of singing in public any longer, he soon did begin to appear in oratorios performed in Florence, the only newly composed works written by Josef Mysliveček: Adamo ed Eva (1771), La passione (1773), and Isacco, figura del redentore (1776). He next appeared in an opera for the first time since 1770 as Farnaspe in the première of Mysliveček's opera Adriano in Siria on 8 September 1776 (and in Giovanni Paisiello’s La disfatta di Dario in October as part of the autumn operatic season in Florence that year). It is not known whether or not Mysliveček himself was mainly responsible for encouraging Guarducci to revive his operatic singing career. He certainly was a close associate of Guarducci, however, one of two great 18th-century castratos with whom he was close to over a period of several years (the other was Luigi Marchesi, whom he began to cultivate shortly after Guarducci's retirement). Guarducci's last operatic appearances took place during the carnival operatic season of 1777 in Perugia in revivals of Mysliveček's Adriano in Siria and Antonio Sacchini's Il Cidde. It seems that the chance to bring to life the role of Farnaspe in Mysliveček's Adriano was quite enticing for Guarducci. After his appearances in Rome during the carnival operatic season of 1770 and acquisition of his villa in Montefiascone, he usually performed only during Lent, especially in March, but sometimes also in April or May (almost never in any other part of the year). Adriano not only brought him back to the public stage, which he told Charles Burney he would never do again, but led him to break spectacularly with his new-found custom of appearing in public only during the months of March, April, and May. Since the first performance of Adriano took place on 8 September 1776, he probably cut short his usual summer stay in Montefiascone. His willingness to revive the role in Perugia during the carnival season of 1777 also indicates an exceptional decision for a singer who had resolved to retire permanently several years earlier.

Guarducci's concert appearances in Florence between 1770 and 1776 were much more extensive than any earlier researchers could have suspected. The most prestigious events, only naturally, were those arranged by the court of Grand Duke Leopold, especially those known to have taken place at the Palazzo Pitti, in 1770, 1772, 1774, and 1775. Doubtless, the most glamorous of these occasions was a concert given at the Palazzo Pitti on 25 April 1772 in honor of a visiting royal duke: Prince William Henry, Duke of Gloucester and Edinburgh, a son of Frederick, Prince of Wales, and a brother of King George III. A sponsoring organization of great important for Guarducci was the Accademia degl'Ingegnosi, newly formed in the late 1760s, a society of literati greatly interested in music that arranged concerts with his participation in various places in Florence in 1770, 1773, 1774, and 1776. The most interesting event of the Ingegnosi was one given in the Corso dei Tintori on 14 March 1773 that featured music by Gluck. Yet another series of appearances took place under the auspices of Earl Cowper, either at his residence or at venues associated with the Accademia degl'Armonici, a group of music lovers headed by the earl. Reports of them are preserved in issues of the Gazzetta toscana and the Notizie del mondo from 1770, 1773, 1774, and 1775 A miscellaneous event arranged for Guarducci of some interest was a concert at the Palazzo Spini Feroni sponsored by Marchese Giuseppe Feroni in 1771.

The Reminiscences of the Irish tenor Michael Kelly provide some of the last significant documentation of Guarducci's activities, including fresh testimony about his abilities at singing in a “natural” sounding cantabile style with minimal ornamentation at an understated dynamic level and his prominence on the operatic stages of his day. He claimed to have met Guarducci in Florence in 1778 and had this to say about him: “I had the good fortune to be noticed by Signor Guarducci [in Florence], the celebrated soprano, and he gave me a few lessons. He had been the first cantabile singer of his time, and his sostenuto singing was still admirable. I went to pass a few days with him, at a villa which he had built, on his retirement from public life, at Montefiascone, his native town ... Signor Guarducci was a liberal and hospitable landlord; and I shall ever retain a grateful sense of his kindness.” The mocking French pamphleteer Ange Goudar, writing under the pseudonym “Jean-Jacques Sonnette”, in 1777 reported that Guarducci had suffered from a chest inflammation that troubled him for 40 years, and that by the time of writing, “he no longer sings, but pretends to sing”.

Without any further record of operatic appearances, it was long believed that Guarducci died about the year 1780, however his date of death has now been established as 10 January 1803 in Montefiascone. The researches of Robert Lamar Weaver and Norma Wright Weaver uncovered Guarducci's participation in concerts of the Accademia degl'Armonici that took place in Florence in the Via Porta Rossa in 1779, 1780, 1784, and 1786, as of now, the singer's last known appearances.

== Operatic roles ==
- Dorinda in the pasticcio La Flora (Urbino, 1743)
- Artaserse in Artaserse by Davide Perez (Lisbon, 1754)
- Elpino in Le cacciatrici amanti by Georg Christoph Wagenseil (Laxenburg, 1755)
- Flavio in L'innocenza giustificata by Christoph Willibald Gluck (Vienna, 1755)
- Mosè in Il roveto di Mosè by Georg Cristoph Wagenseil (Vienna, 1756)
- Elpino in Le cacciatrici amanti by Georg Christoph Wagenseil (Vienna, 1756)
- Osmino in Il Solimano by Giovanni Battista Pescetti (Reggio Emilia, 1756)
- Arbace in Artaserse by Quirino Gasparini (Milan, 1757)
- Ezio in Ezio by Baldassare Galuppi (Milan, 1757)
- Sirbace in Rosbale by Giuseppe Scolari (Padua, 1757)
- Ezio in Ezio by Gaetano Latilla (Naples, 1758)
- Sammete in Nitteti by Johann Adolph Hasse (Florence, 1758)
- Timante in Demofoonte by Johann Adolph Hasse (Naples, 1758)
- Unknown role in Siroe, re di Persia by Pasquale Errichelli (Naples, 1758)
- Sesto in La clemenza di Tito by Johann Adolph Hasse (Naples, 1759)
- Sesto in La clemenza di Tito by Johann Adolph Hasse (Siena, 1759)
- Pirro in Cajo Fabricio by Gian Francesco de Majo (Naples, 1760)
- Tiridate in Zenobia by Nicola Sala (Naples, 1761)
- Oreste in Andromaca by Antonio Sacchini (Naples, 1761)
- Cesare in Catone in Utica by Johann Christian Bach (Naples, 1761)
- Linceo in Ipermestra by Pasquale Cafaro (Naples, 1761)
- Poro in Alessandro nell’Indie by Johann Christian Bach (Naples, 1762)
- Timante in the pasticcio Demofoonte (Florence, 1762)
- Poro in Alessandro nell’Indie by Gian Gualberto Brunetti (Pisa, 1763)
- Megacle in L'Olimpiade by Baldassare Galuppi (Siena, 1763)
- Sesostri in the pasticcio Sesostri, re d’Egitto (Florence, 1764)
- Eumene in the pasticcio Eumene (Florence, 1764)
- Siveno in the anonymous L’eroe cinese (Parma, 1764)
- Eumene in Eumene by Antonio Sacchini (Rome, 1765)
- Farnace in Farnace by Pietro Alessandro Guglielmi (Rome, 1765)
- Farnace in Farnace by Pietro Alessandro Guglielmi (Palermo, 1765)
- Sesostri in the pasticcio Sesostri, re d’Egitto (Palermo, 1766)
- Eumene in Artemisia, perhaps a reworking of Antonio Sacchini's Eumene (Florence, 1766)
- Zamarne in the pasticcio Trackebarne gran Mogol (London, 1767)
- Ezio in the anonymous Ezio (London, 1767)
- Carattaco in Carattaco by Johann Christian Bach (London, 1767)
- Sifare in Sifare by Carl Friedrich Abel (London, 1767)
- Montezuma in La conquista del Messico by Mattia Vento (London, 1767)
- Tigrane in the pasticcio Tigrane (London, 1767)
- Achille in Ifigenia in Aulide by Pietro Alessandro Guglielmi (London, 1768)
- Sesostri in Sesostri by Pietro Alessandro Guglielmi (London, 1768)
- Rodrigo in Il Cidde by Antonio Sacchini (Rome, 1769)
- Sesto in La clemenza di Tito by Pasquale Anfossi (Rome, 1769)
- Farnaspe in the pasticcio Adriano in Siria (Genoa, 1769)
- Enea in Didone abbandonata by Niccolò Piccinni (Rome, 1770)
- Siroe in Siroe by Carlo Franchi (Rome, 1770)
- Sammete in La Nitteti by Josef Mysliveček (Bologna, 1770)
- Rinaldo in Armida by Vincenzo Manfredini (Bologna, 1770)
- Alessandro in La disfatta di Dario by Giovanni Paisiello (Florence, 1776)
- Farnaspe in Adriano in Siria by Josef Mysliveček (Florence, 1776)
- Farnaspe in Adriano in Siria by Josef Mysliveček (Perugia, 1777)
- Rodrigo in Il Cidde by Antonio Sacchini (Perugia, 1777)

Source of roles: Corago Cantanti Project, Tommaso Guarducci

== Bibliography ==
Carnevale, Nadia. “Guarducci, Tommaso”, in Dizionario biografico degli italiani [DBI], vol. 60, Rome 2003, pp. 313–15.
