= Giuseppe Scarlatti =

Italian composer

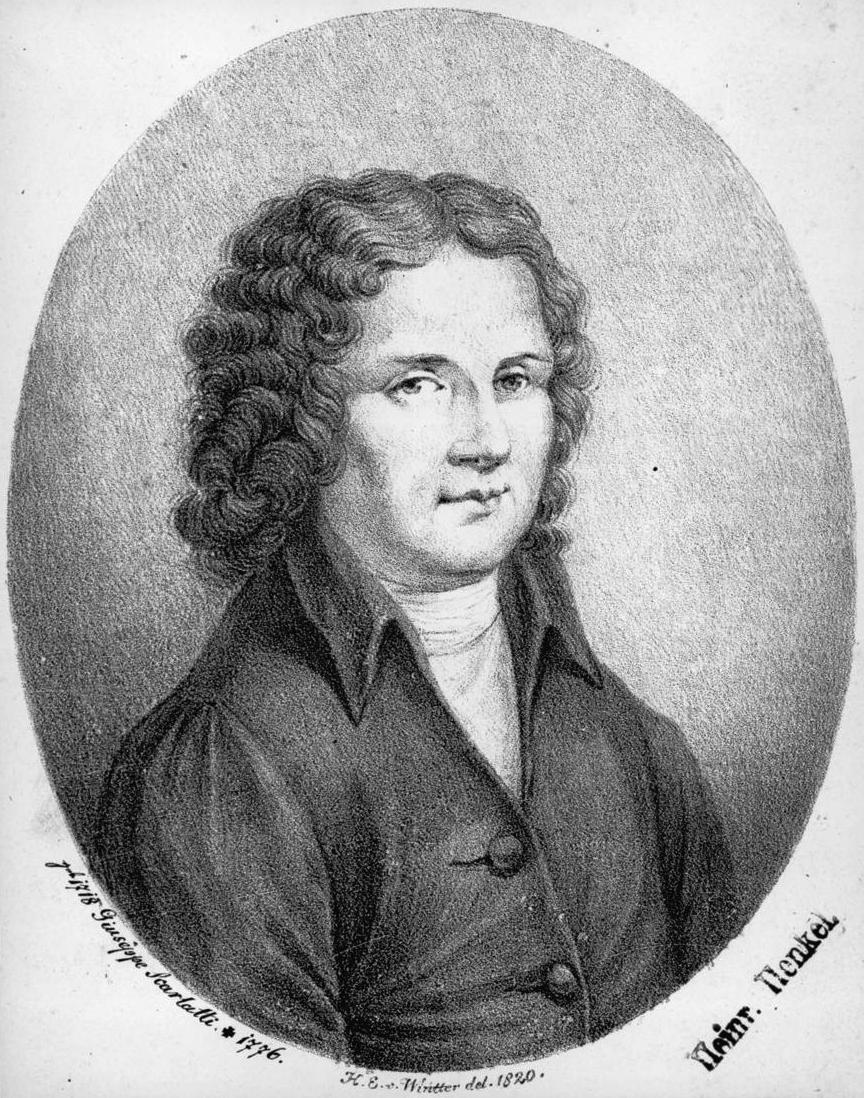
1820 lithograph of Giuseppe Scarlatti by Heinrich E. Winter

Giuseppe Scarlatti (1718 or 18 June 1723, Naples – 17 August 1777, Vienna) was a composer of opere serie and opere buffe. He worked in Rome from 1739 to 1741, and from 1752 to 1754 in Florence, Pisa, Lucca and Turin. From 1752 to 1754, and again from 1756 to 1759, he worked in Venice and for short periods in Milan and Barcelona. In 1760 he moved to Vienna, where he enjoyed the friendship of Christoph Willibald Gluck. "The third most important musician of his clan", it is still uncertain whether he was born on 18 June 1723 (to Tommaso Scarlatti, c.1669-1760) as the nephew of Alessandro or in 1718 as nephew of Domenico. Giuseppe Scarlatti was married to the Viennese singer Barbara Stabili who died about 1753. By 1767 he had married Antonia Lefebvre, who that year bore him a son; she died three years later. Scarlatti died intestate in 1777 in Vienna.

== Works ==
=== Operas ===
Title	Genre	Subdivisions	Libretto	Première date	Place, theatre
Merope	dramma per musica	3 acts	Apostolo Zeno	23 January 1740	Rome, Teatro Capranica
Dario	dramma per musica	3 acts	G. Baldanza	carnival 1741	Rome, Teatro Argentina
Arminio in Germania	dramma per musica	3 acts	C. Pasquini	24 June 1741	Florence, Teatro della Pergola
Siroe	dramma per musica	3 acts	Metastasio	June 1742	Florence, Teatro della Pergola
Pompeo in Armenia	dramma per musica	3 acts	Bartolomeo Vitturi	carnival 1744	Pisa, Pubblico
Ezio	dramma per musica	3 acts	Metastasio	autumn 1744	Lucca, Civico
Olimpiade	dramma per musica	3 acts	Metastasio	autumn 1745	Lucca, Pubblico
Il giocatore	commedia per musica	2 acts		carnival 1747	Florence, Cocomero
Artaserse	dramma per musica	3 acts	Metastasio	26 August 1747	Lucca
Partenope	dramma per musica	3 acts	Silvio Stampiglia	carnival 1749	Turin, Regio
Semiramide riconosciuta	dramma per musica	3 acts	Metastasio	carnival 1751	Livorno, San Sebastiano
Adriano in Siria	dramma per musica	3 acts	Metastasio	carnival 1752	Venice, San Cassiano
Demetrio	dramma per musica	3 acts	Metastasio	11 June 1752	Padua, Nuovo
I portentosi effetti della Madre Natura	dramma giocoso per musica	3 acts	Carlo Goldoni	11 November 1752	Venice, San Samuele
L'impostore	opera buffa			1752	Barcelona, Santa Cruz
Alessandro nell'Indie	dramma per musica	3 acts	Metastasio	12 May 1753	Reggio Emilia, Pubblico
De gustibus non est disputandum	dramma giocoso per musica	3 acts	Carlo Goldoni	carnival 1754	Venice, San Cassiano
Caio Mario	dramma per musica	3 acts	Gaetano Roccaforte	20 January 1755	Naples, Teatro di San Carlo
Antigona	dramma per musica	3 acts	Gaetano Roccaforte	carnival 1756	Milan, Ducale
L'isola disabitata (La Cinese smarrita)	dramma giocoso per musica	3 acts	Carlo Goldoni	autumn 1757	Venice, San Samuele
La serva scaltra	dramma giocoso per musica	3 acts		autumn 1759	Venice, Teatro San Moisè
La clemenza di Tito	dramma per musica	3 acts	Metastasio	carnival 1760	Venice, San Benedetto
L'Issipile	dramma per musica	3 acts	Metastasio	autumn 1760	Vienna, Burgtheater
Pelopida (second act)	dramma per musica	3 acts	Gaetano Roccaforte	carnival 1763	Turin, Regio
Bajazet	dramma per musica	3 acts	Agostino Piovene	carnival 1765	Verona, Accademia Filharmonica
Gli stravaganti (La moglie padrona)	commedia per musica	2 acts	Alcindo Isaurense	11 February 1765	Vienna, Burgtheater
Armida	festa teatrale		Marco Coltellini	circa 1766	Vienna, Burgtheater
Dove è amore è gelosia	intermezzo giocoso		Marco Coltellini	24 July 1768	Český Krumlov, Český Krumlov Castle
L'amor geloso	azione teatrale comica			5 July 1770	Vienna, Schönbrunn Palace
Amiti e Ontario, o I selvaggi	dramma per musica		Ranieri de' Calzabigi	1772	Vienna, Burgtheater

==== Dubious attributions ====
- La madamigella (libretto by Antonio Palomba, 1755, Naples)
- Il mercato di Malmantide (dramma giocoso per musica, libretto by Carlo Goldoni, 1758, Venice)

=== Other works ===
- La Santissima Vergine annunziata (oratorio, 1739, Rome)
- Componimento per musica (serenata, 1739, Rome)
- L'amor della patria (serenata, libretto by Carlo Goldoni, 1752, Venice)
- Les aventures de Serail (ballet, 1762, Vienna)
- Imeneo, sognando talora (cantata for tenor and basso continuo)
- I lamenti d'Orfeo (cantata for 2 voices and orchestra)
- Amor prigioniero (cantata for 2 sopranos and instruments)
- Various arias
- Sonata for clavicembalo

== Selected recordings ==
- Giuseppe Scarlatti: I portentosi effetti della Madre Natura Ensemble 1700 1CD DHM 2023
