= Pyramus and Thisbe (opera) =

1745 opera by John Frederick Lampe

Pyramus and Thisbe is a "mock opera" by the German-born composer John Frederick Lampe on the story of Pyramus and Thisbe. It was first performed at Covent Garden Theatre, London, on 25 January 1745. The anonymous libretto (possibly the work of the composer or Henry Carey) is based on Richard Leveridge's The Comickal Masque of Pyramus and Thisbe (1716), itself inspired by the "play within a play" in act 5 of William Shakespeare's A Midsummer Night's Dream.

This was the last of Lampe's operas, and was a much-needed success after a difficult period for musicians in the London theatre. In 1741 the revolution in Shakespearean acting initiated by Macklin and Garrick diverted attention away from music, and Lampe produced no new work in the major theatres for four years. Pyramus returns to the vein of burlesque that he mined in The Dragon of Wantley (1737), his first popular success; it ridicules Italian-style opera and opera singers rather than Shakespeare's plays and players. The onstage audience, originally Duke Theseus and his entourage, consists of Mr Semibrief (the impresario) and two gentlemen, one of whom has experienced Italian opera at first hand on the grand tour; they interject facetious spoken comments as the all-sung opera proceeds. The story follows Shakespeare closely: the Wall (tenor) sports a chink through which Pyramus (tenor) and Thisbe (soprano) arrange to meet 'at Ninny's tomb'. Thisbe arrives first and is frightened away by the Lion (bass), who sings a splendid roaring aria. After the Moon (tenor) has sung a lyrical Arne-like number, Pyramus appears, fears the worst and stabs himself 'like a hero in Italian opera, to very good time and tune'; Thisbe follows suit. But they are revived by Mr Semibrief in time to sing the epilogue. Lampe's music is charming and largely deadpan, though there are the standard Handelian rage and revenge arias. The full score (London, 1745/ R 1988) omits the secco recitatives, a dance and the last chorus.

== Recording ==
- Pyramus and Thisbe Mark Padmore, Susan Bisatt, Opera Restor'd, The Parley of Instruments, conducted by Peter Holman (Hyperion, 1995)

== Sources ==
- The Viking Opera Guide ed. Amanda Holden (Viking, 1993)
- Magazine de l'opéra baroque (in French)
