= Il re pastore (Gluck) =

Opera by Christoph Willibald Gluck

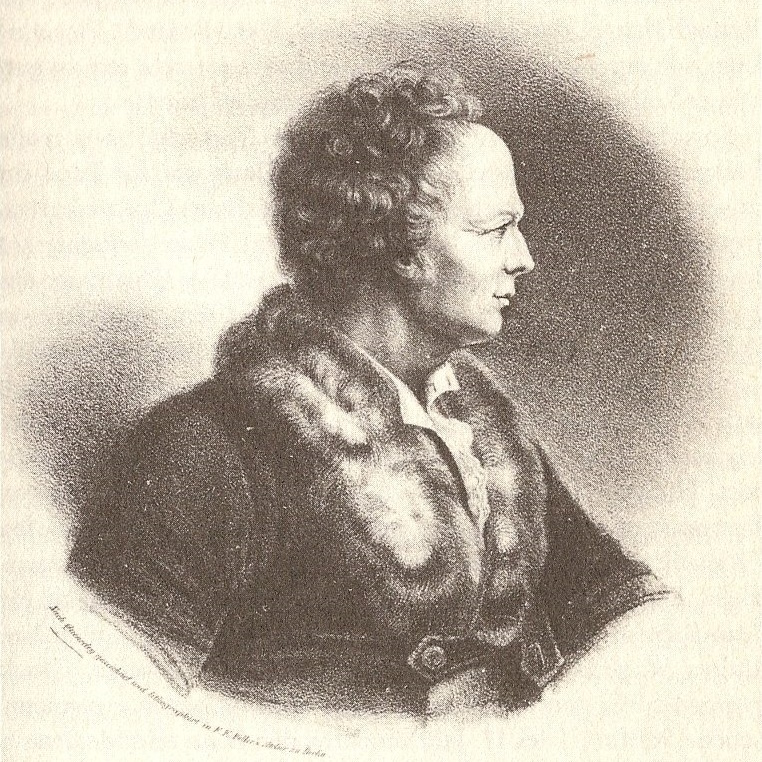
Portrait of Christoph Willibald Gluck, ca. 1750

Il re pastore (The Shepherd King) is an opera by the composer Christoph Willibald Gluck. It takes the form of a dramma per musica in three acts. The Italian-language libretto is by Pietro Metastasio. The opera premiered on 8 December 1756 at the Burgtheater, Vienna.

== Roles ==
Role	Voice type	Premiere Cast
Alessandro, King of Macedonia	tenor	Pietro Mezzo
Aminta, a shepherd, rightful heir to Sidon	soprano castrato	Ferdinando Mazzanti
Elisa, a noble nymph of Phoenicia, of the family of Cadmus	soprano	Catarina Gabrielli
Tamiri, a fugitive princess, daughter of the deposed tyrant Stratone	soprano	Francesca Gabrielli
Agenore, a Sidonian nobleman	soprano castrato	Paolo Bareggi

== Sources ==
- Holden, Amanda The Viking Opera Guide (Viking, 1993), page 373.
- Gluck Gesamtausgabe Il re pastore
