= Český Krumlov Castle =

Castle in the Czech Republic

Coordinates: 48°48′45″N 14°18′55″E

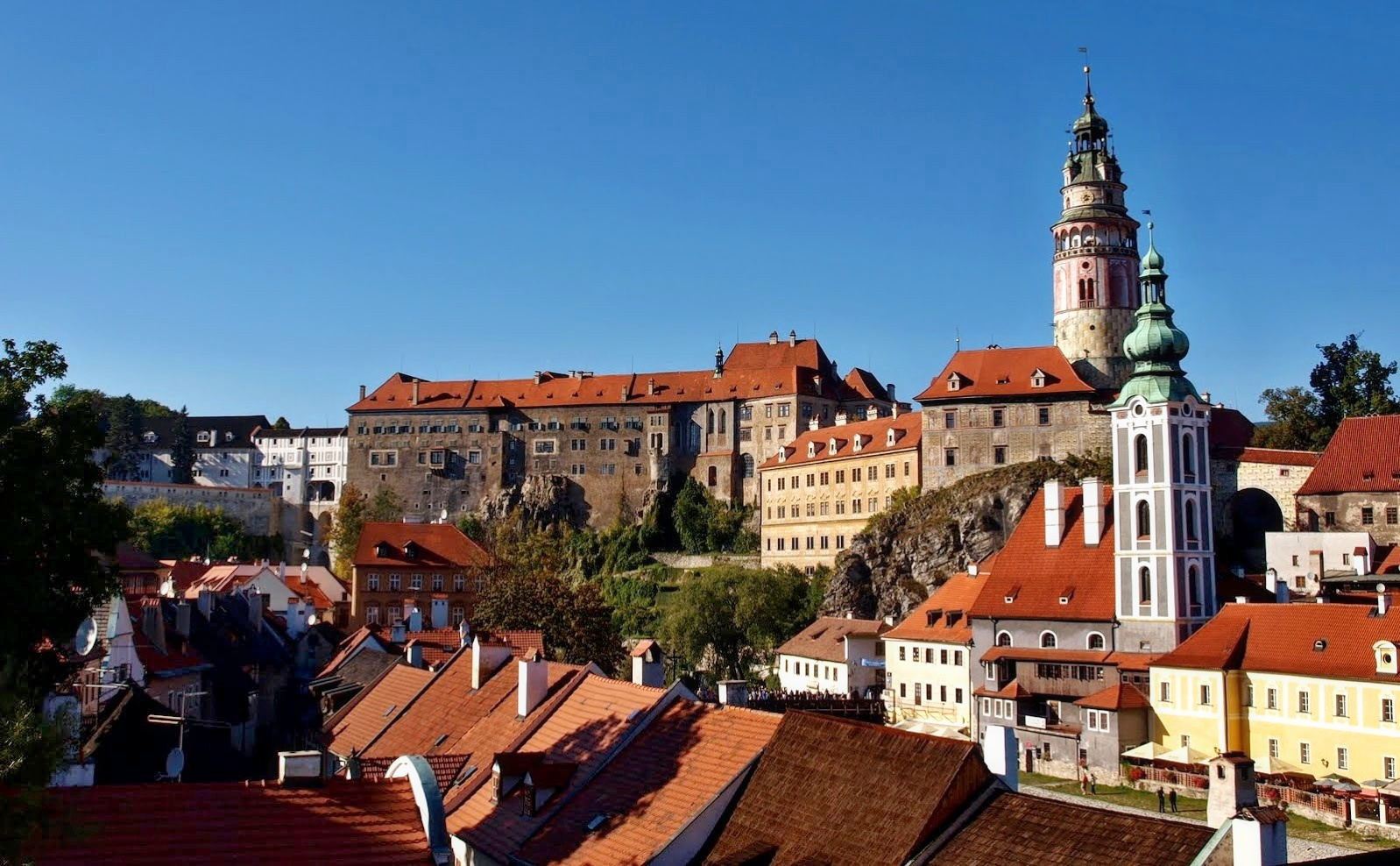
Český Krumlov Castle

Český Krumlov Castle (Czech: Hrad Český Krumlov) is a castle in Český Krumlov in the South Bohemian Region of the Czech Republic. It dates back to 1253 when the first castle was built by the Vítkovci family, the main branch of the powerful Bohemian family Rosenberg.

Currently the castle is listed as a national heritage site and a UNESCO World Heritage Site since 1992, this serves as a major tourist attraction. It is the second most visited castle and the second largest castle and chateau complex in the Czech Republic after Prague Castle.

== History ==
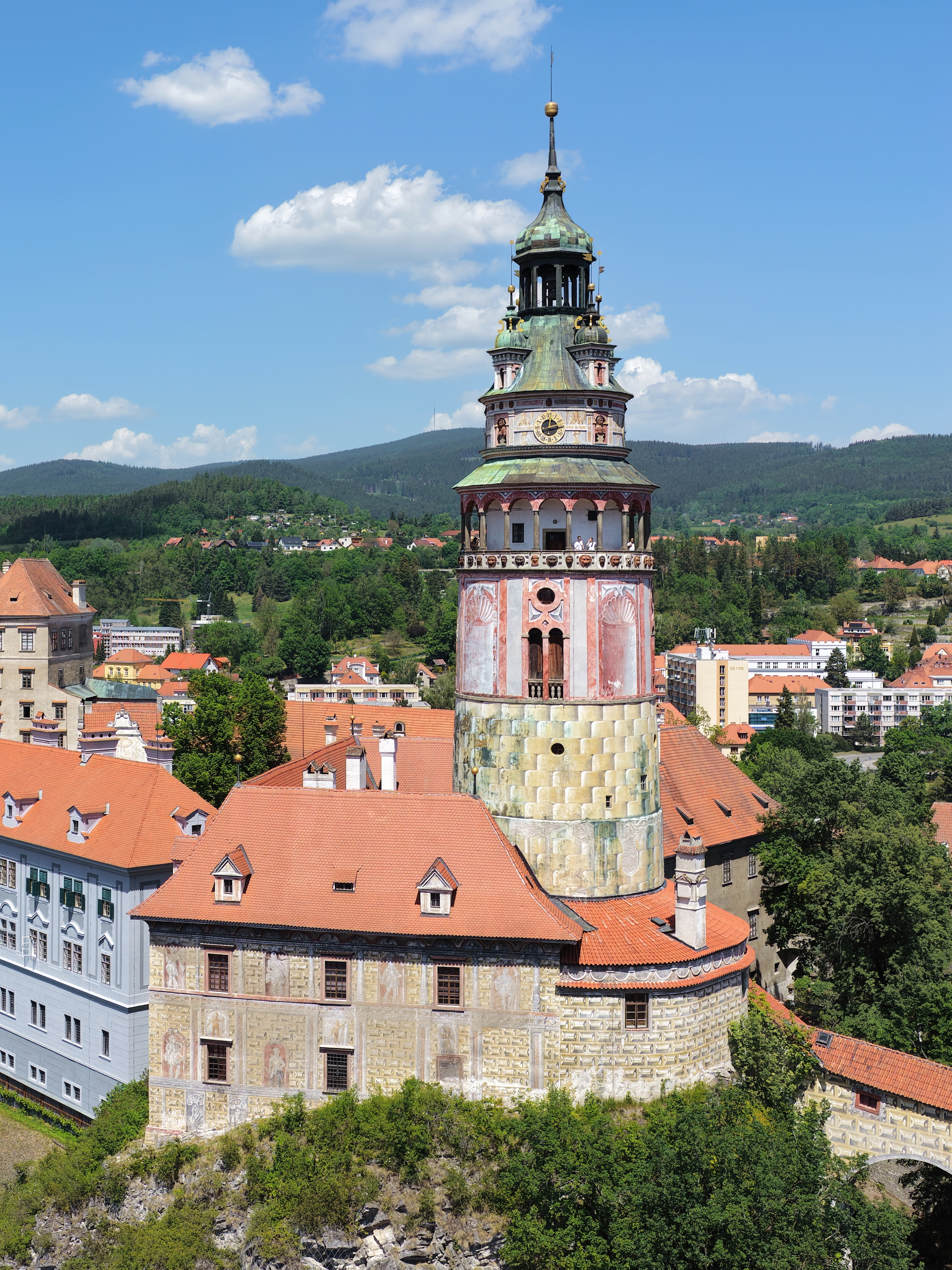
The castle tower with the Little Castle

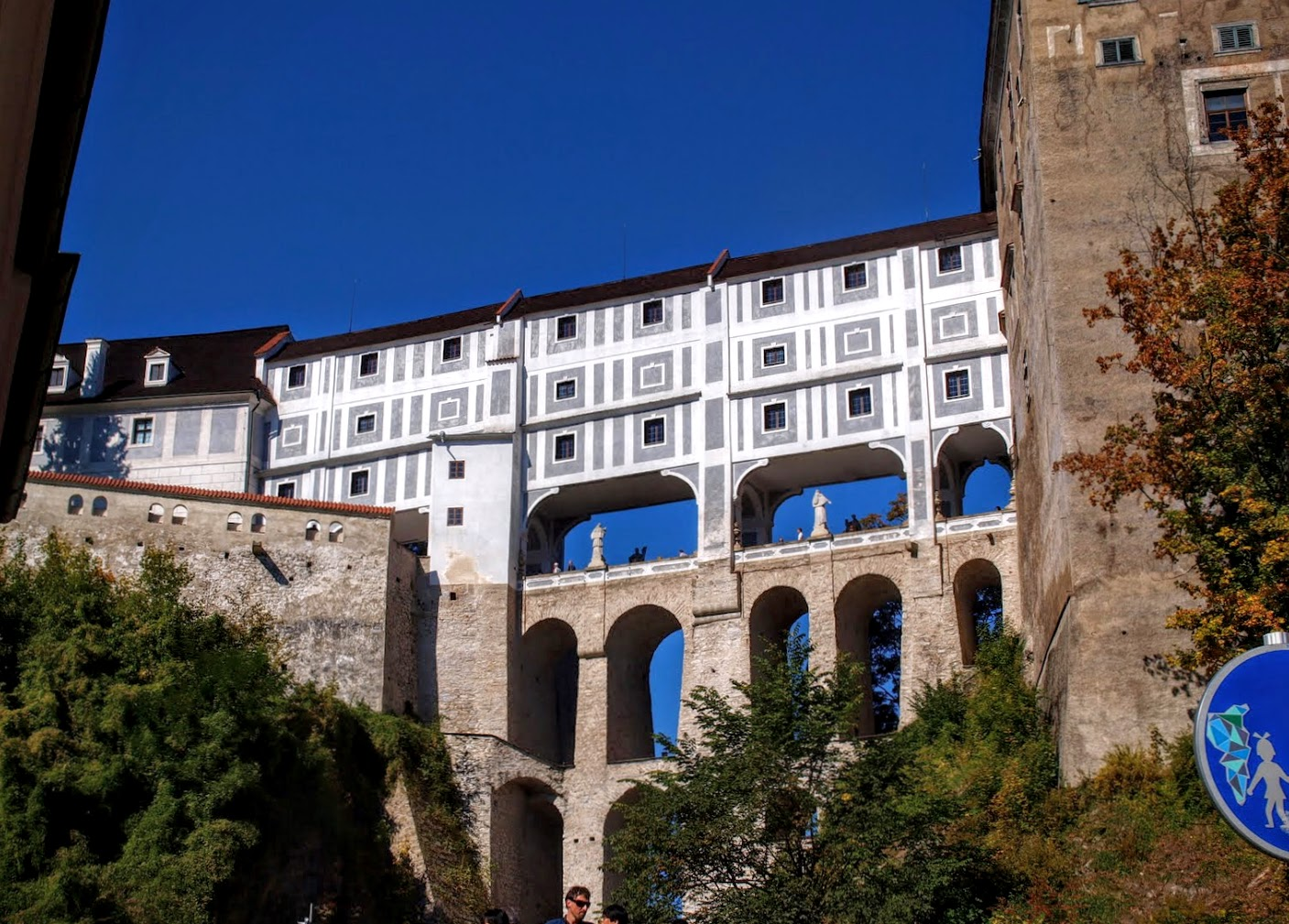
The Cloak Bridge

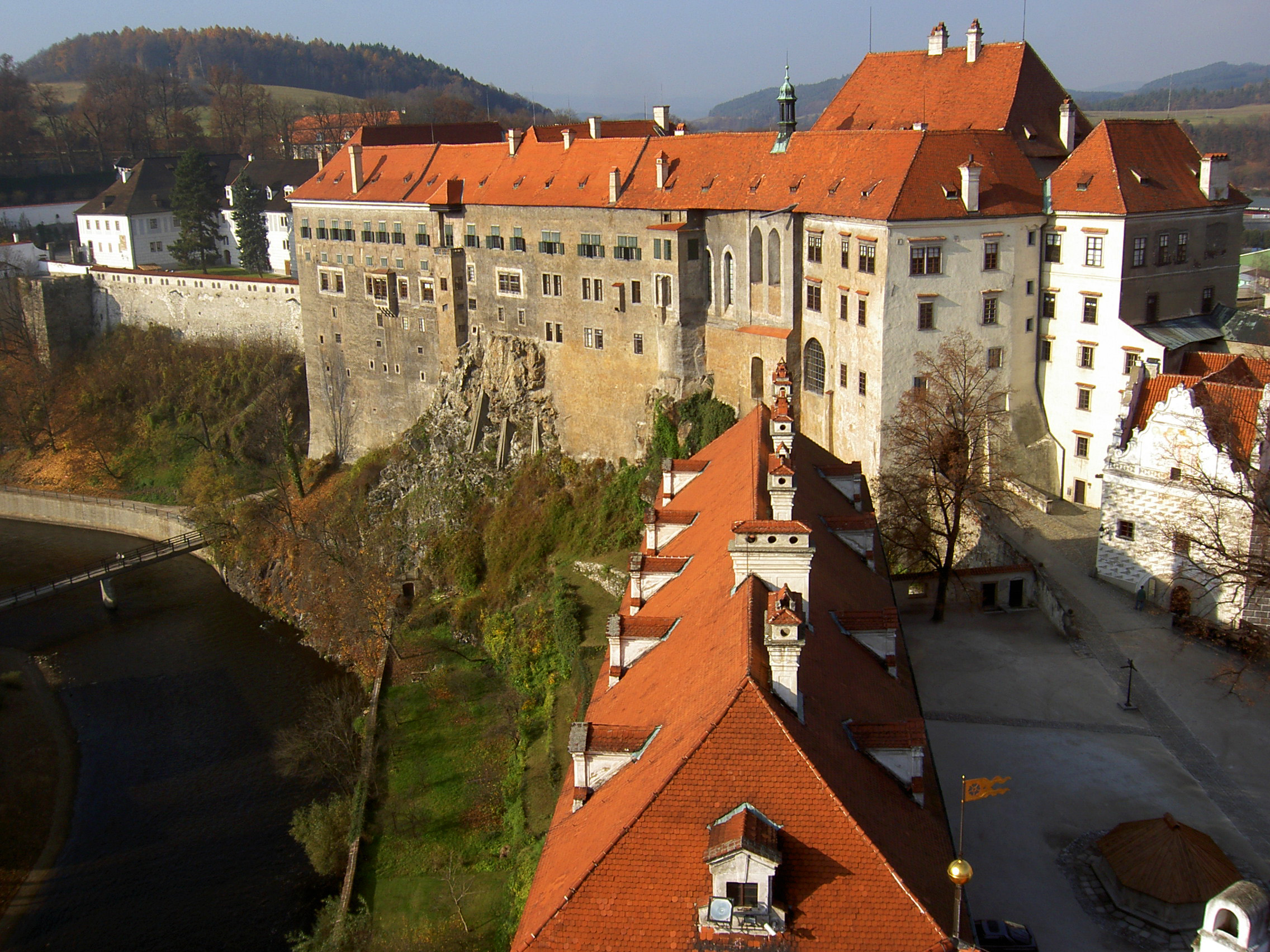
The Upper Castle

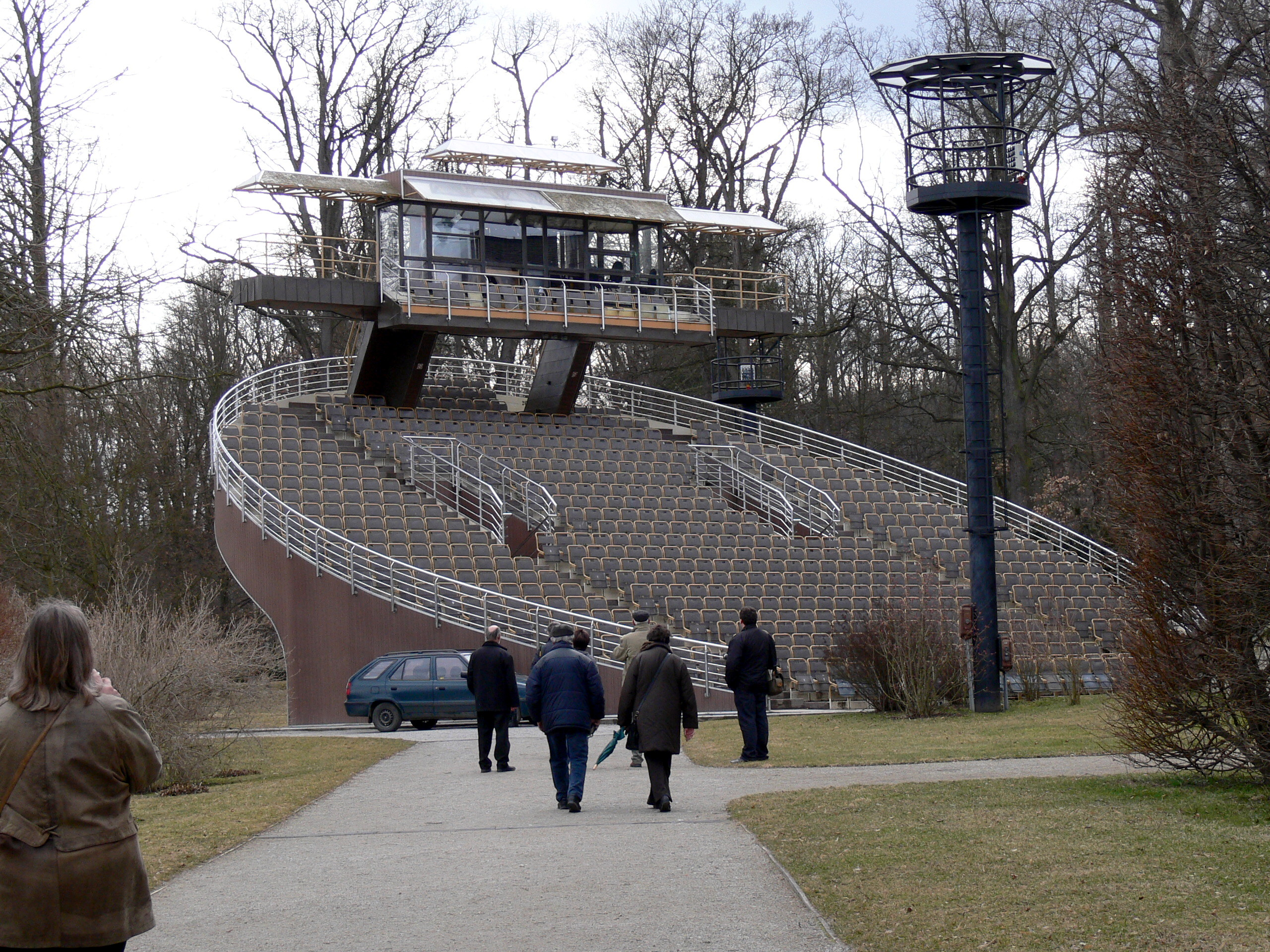
The revolving auditorium

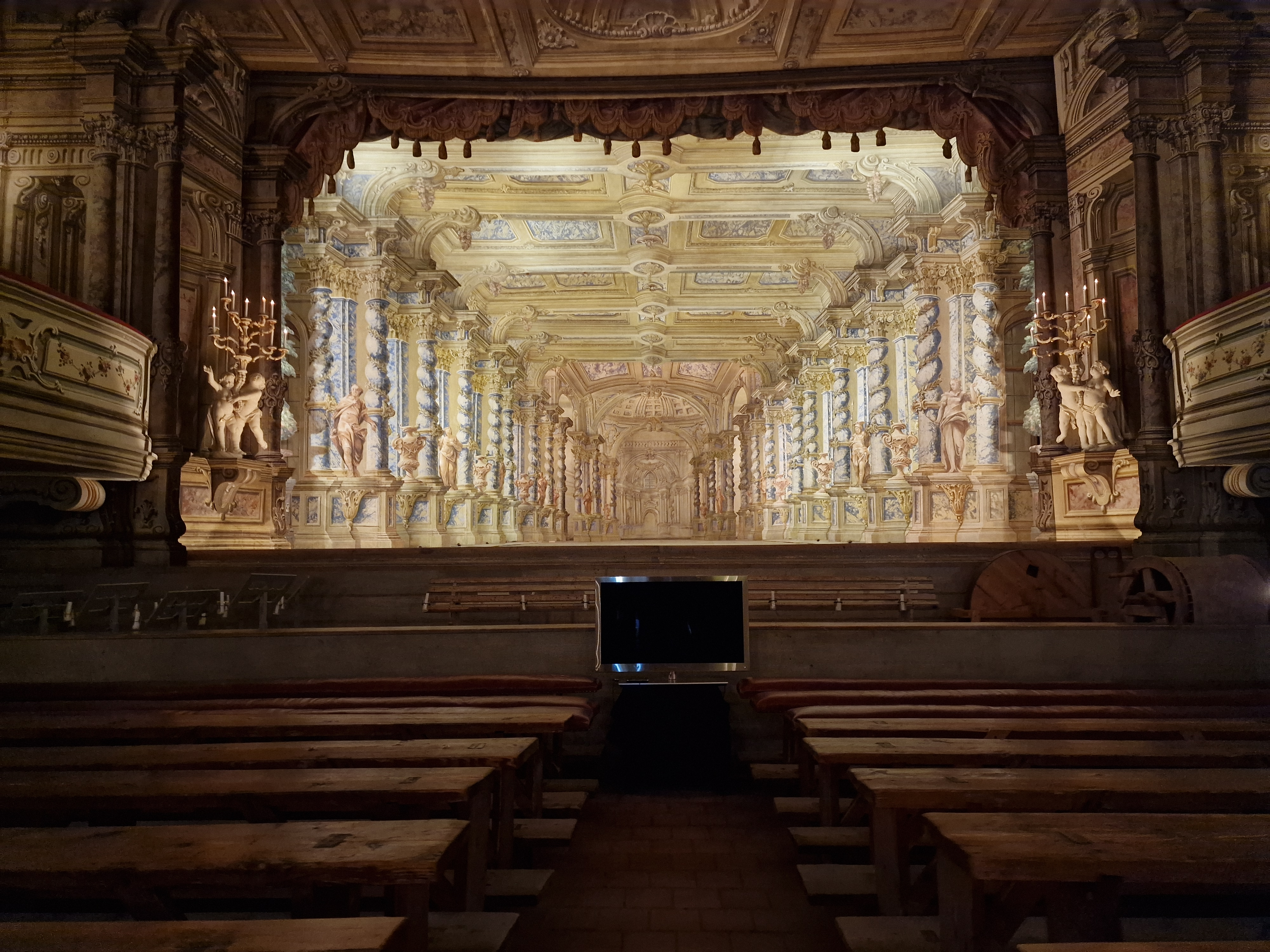
Stage of the Castle Theatre

The earliest documented reference to the castle is from 1253, marking it as the residence of the noble Witiko of Prčice from the Vítkovci family. After the Vítkov lineage of the Krumlov family died out in 1302, the castle came under the Rosenberg family’s control, who initiated a significant Renaissance makeover led by William of Rosenberg.

By the 17th century the Rosenbergs had died out, and Holy Roman Emperor Ferdinand II gave the dominion of Krumau to Hans Ulrich von Eggenberg, naming him Duke of Krumau. After the death of Hans Ulrich's son, Johann Anton I von Eggenberg, the castle was administered for the period between 1649 and 1664 by his widow, Anna Maria.

One of her two sons, Johann Christian I von Eggenberg, was responsible for the Baroque renovations and expansions to the castle, including the castle theatre now called the Eggenberg Theatre. When the male line of the Eggenbergs died out in 1717, the castle and duchy passed into the possession of the Schwarzenbergs. In 1947, the Schwarzenberg property, including Český Krumlov, was transferred to the Czech provincial properties and in 1950 it became the property of the Czechoslovak State. The entire area was declared a national monument in 1989 and in 1992 it was added to the UNESCO World Heritage List.

== Points of interest ==
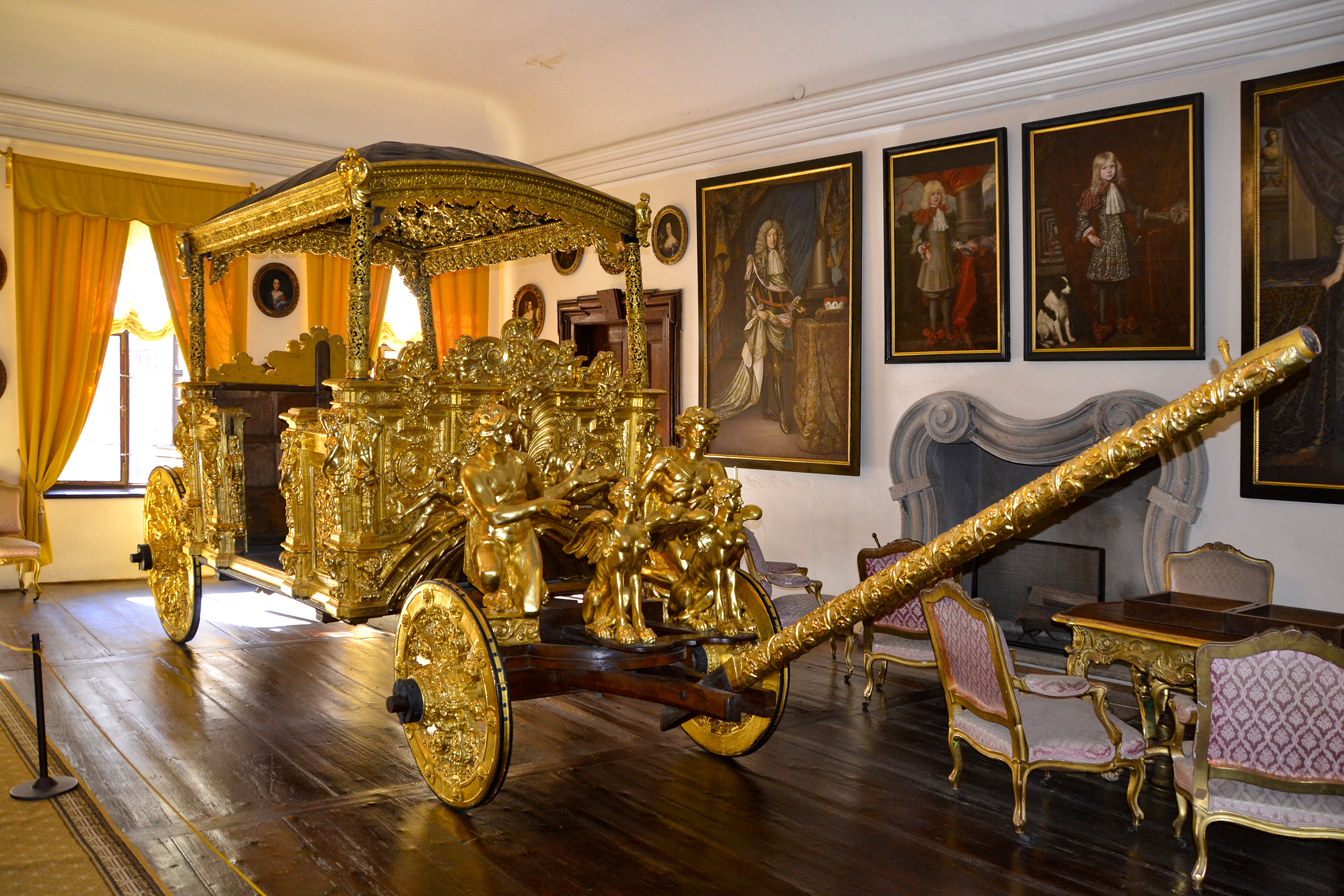
The Golden Carriage from 1638 on display in the museum

The castle stands on a steep and long rocky headland, which is lined with Vltava from the south. The bridge over the Bear Moat leads through the passage to the Lower Castle, on the left side is the oldest part of the castle (Hrádek), an old palace with a tower from the 13th century and paintings from 1580. From the tower is a beautiful view of the castle and the city. The eastern and northern wing of the irregular large courtyard of the Lower Castle consists of a burgrave's house from 1578. In the middle of the courtyard is a stone fountain from 1641. Across another moat a brick bridge leads to the Upper Castle, the Rosenberg Palace. The unique five-story Cloak Bridge over a deep carved moat from 1764 connects Upper Castle with the castle theater building and gardens.

The Český Krumlov Baroque Theatre from 1767 is one of the best preserved Baroque theatres in the world. It is comparable in Europe with only a few theaters, such as the Swedish Royal Drottningholm Palace Theatre, the Queen's Theater in Palace of Versailles and the Margravial Opera House, whereas the Český Krumlov theater is the best preserved of them in its original form. To the west are the castle gardens in the late baroque style with a cascade fountain from the middle of the 18th century. In the gardens is since 1959 located the revolving auditorium.

The White Lady supposedly used to appear at the Český Krumlov Castle. It is said that it is the ghost of Perchta of Rosenberg, her mysterious image hangs on the wall in the castle.
