= Giuseppina Grassini =

Italian opera singer

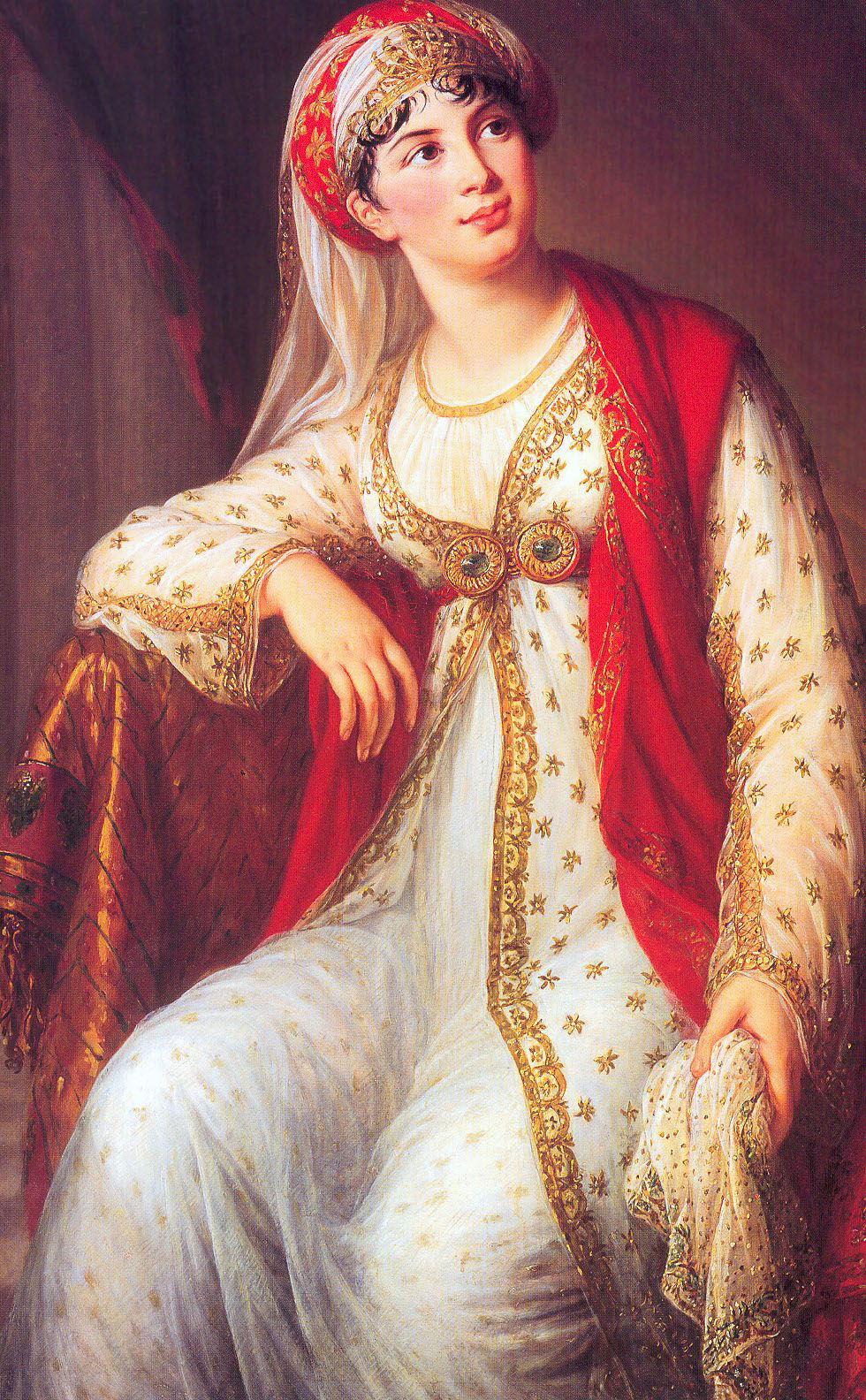
- Portrait by Élisabeth Vigée Le Brun, 1805
- Born: Varese
- Died: 3 January 1850 (aged 76); Milan
- Occupation: Singer
- Known for: Affairs with famous men

Gioseppa Maria Camilla, commonly known as Giuseppina (or also Josephina) Grassini (8 April 1773 (Note: Sources generally state 18 April 1773 as the date of Grassini's birth. However, Bruno Belli recently found her baptismal certificate in the registers of baptisms kept in the Prepositural Archive of the Basilica of San Vittore in Varese. The certificate, which is reproduced in photocopy on p. 161 of Belli's book, reads that "Gioseppa Maria Camilla", daughter of Antonio Grassini, was baptized on 9 April 1773, and that she was born on the "antecedent [day] around eighteen hours", namely on 8 April.) – 3 January 1850) was an Italian dramatic contralto, and a singing teacher. She was a celebrity of considerable stature, noted for her beauty and regarded as one of the best singers in Europe. Giuseppina was also known for her affairs with Napoleon and the Duke of Wellington. She sang in various productions by composers such as Cimarosa, Cherubini and Zingarelli.

== Biography ==
After growing up under the musical guidance of her mother, an amateur violinist, and Domenico Zucchinetti in Varese, and Antonio Secchi in Milan, Grassini made her stage début in 1789 in Parma singing in Guglielmi's La pastorella nobile, and the following year at Milan's La Scala in three opere buffe including Guglielmi's La bella pescatrice and Salieri's La cifra. These first comic performances were not a great success, and Grassini was driven to resume the study of singing and to turn to drama.

=== Beginnings and Italian career apex ===
From 1792 she returned fully to the stage in the theatres of Vicenza, Venice, Milan again, Naples and Ferrara. She sang (among others) in the first Scala performance of Zingarelli's Artaserse (1793), in the première of Portugal's Demofoonte (1794), in Bertoni's Orfeo ed Euridice (Euridice), in Mayr's Telemaco nell’isola di Calipso (première, 1797), in Cimarosa's Artemisia regina di Caria (première, 1797) and in the first Fenice performance of Nasolini's La morte di Semiramide (1798, title role). Her year of glory, however, was 1796, when she created two roles which remained in the repertoire for some decades and are now famous, in both appearing beside the soprano castrato Girolamo Crescentini, who was also Grassini's master and whose teachings she followed faithfully throughout her life. Nicola Zingarelli wrote the part of Giulietta for her in his opera Giulietta e Romeo, staged at Milan's La Scala on 30 January, while Domenico Cimarosa composed the role of Horatia (Orazia) in Gli Orazi e i Curiazi, staged instead in northern Italy's second most important theatre, Venice's La Fenice, on 26 December. In that same year, Grassini took part in a third première of Gaetano Marinelli's Issipile, which was by no means as successful as the others.

=== Napoleonic period and retirement ===
On 4 June 1800, shortly before the victory at Marengo, while interpreting Andreozzi's La vergine del sole at La Scala, Milan, Grassini (who was, by this time, already well known for her unruly love affairs) made a strong hit with Napoleon Bonaparte. He enrolled her among his lovers and brought her to Paris, where she sang in several concerts. Grassini's relationship with the First Consul was probably not convenient, but it was a sign of her modern, free attitude, so that when she, in turn, took a liking to the violinist Pierre Rode, she did not hesitate to embark upon a fresh affair with him (practically under the nose of the future Emperor), and to quit Paris for an 1801 concert tour in the Netherlands and Germany, returning finally to Italy.

In the years 1804 and 1805 Grassini was in London where, at the King's Theatre, she sang in some revivals of Andreozzi's La vergine del sole, Nasolini's La morte di Cleopatra and Fioravanti's Camilla, as well as in the premières of von Winter's Il ratto di Proserpina and Zaira. In “Il ratto” there appeared Elizabeth Billington, too, and the two prima-donnas confronted each other in a singing contest from which the Italian singer emerged triumphant.

In 1806 Grassini returned to Paris together with her former master Crescentini, where she was appointed first chamber virtuosa of Emperor Napoleon. At the Tuileries Palace Grassini was on stage as the protagonist in the première of Paër's La Didone and in Cherubini's Pimmalione.

La Grassini was in Paris during the autumn of 1814. Rumors abounded at this time that she was the lover of the Duke of Wellington, who was serving as the British Ambassador to Paris. While there is a lack of proof that she was his mistress, they were often seen together and he kept a portrait of her in his room in the British Embassy, alongside those of Pope Pius VII and Pauline Borghese.

After settling in Rome during Napoleon's exile on the Isle of Elba, she went back to Paris during the Hundred Days. Having stayed there after the Restoration, Grassini was soon forced to leave French territory because Louis XVIII was unwilling to tolerate the great popularity of Napoleon's former lover.

After a further stay in London, where she had been engaged at the Haymarket Theatre, and where she took part in the première of Pucitta's Aristodemo, she eventually made her way back to Italy and there continued to sing in operatic theatres. She sang in Brescia, Padua, Trieste, Florence and, in 1817, again at La Scala, without, however, achieving such success as formerly she had been accorded. She retired from the stage in 1823 and finally settled in Milan, giving herself up also to teaching, among other pupils, Giuditta Pasta and her nieces Giulia and Giuditta Grisi. She died at the age of 76 in 1850.

== Artistic style ==
Although critics as usual could not agree, Giuseppina Grassini was undoubtedly one of the greatest stage singers of the 18th and 19th centuries. Commonly classed as a contralto, Grassini sang, in fact, in tessiture which would later be ascribed to mezzo-sopranos and had rather a narrow vocal range. She could however rely upon a voice of great power and volume and, at the same time, of considerable pliability, to which she added excellent interpretative capability and extraordinary physical beauty. This last quality made her not only the subject of many love affairs but also the ideal model for many contemporary painters including Andrea Appiani.

Faithful to her "old" (Note: Crescentini was in reality only seven years older than Grassini, but, given the very early training undertaken by the castrati, the separation between them in terms of duration of experience and artistic maturity probably appeared wider.) master and partner Crescentini's musical ideals, Grassini would always stand beside such singers as the castrato Gaspare Pacchiarotti, the tenors Matteo Babini, Giovanni Ansani and Giacomo David, the prime-donne Brigida Banti and Luísa Todi. These were the singers who opposed the belcanto drift of the second half of the 18th century, with its break-neck run after extremely high notes and aimlessly pyrotechnic, inexpressive, and therefore absurd coloratura; and who endeavoured, instead, to recover “the passion and vigour” that had permeated the golden age of singing of the first half of the century.

She was therefore one of a particular group of leading singers who in this way helped to establish a new artistic trend, which soon evolved into 'the Rossini grand finale' of an entire musical era. Being the youngest of all the mentioned singers, Grassini herself formed a living link between them and the following generation. (Note: Much the same may be said of Giacomo David, not because he was younger, but owing to his exceptionally long career and teaching activity.) Acute (as usual) when writing about opera, Stendhal observed his favourite singer of the new generation, Giuditta Pasta:

"(She) is too young to have heard Signora Todi on the stage; nor can she have heard Pacchierotti, Marchesi or Crescentini; nor, as far as I can discover, did she ever have occasion to hear them later, after their retirement, in private performances or at concerts; yet every connoisseur who ever heard these great representatives of the Golden Age voices the general opinion that she appears to have inherited their style. The only teacher from whom she has received singing-lessons is Signora Grassini, with whom she once spent a season in Brescia",

and alongside whom—Stendhal could have added—she had been an ideal Curiatius (Note: "[curiazzeggiò] più volte con lei" (that is: "she Curiatiused several times with her"), jests Morelli in his essay (in Gli Orazi e i Curiazi, p. 27).) in several revivals of Cimarosa's opera.

== Main roles created ==
The list below although not exhaustive is representative of Grassini's career.

role	opera	genre	composer	theatre	première's date
Polissena	Pirro	opera seria-pasticcio (dramma per musica, 2nd version)	Francesco Gardi, Francesco Bianchi, Sebastiano Nasolini and Nicola Antonio Zingarelli,	Venice, Teatro (Venier) San Benedetto	8 May 1793
Giulietta	Giulietta e Romeo	tragedia per musica (opera seria)	Nicola Antonio Zingarelli	Milan, Teatro alla Scala	30 January 1796
Issipile	L'Issipile	dramma per musica (opera seria)	Gaetano Marinelli	Venice, Teatro alla Fenice	12 November 1796
Orazia	Gli Orazi e i Curiazi	tragedia per musica (1st version)	Domenico Cimarosa	Venice, Teatro alla Fenice	26 December 1796
Calipso	Telemaco nell'isola di Calipso	dramma per musica	Giovanni Simone Mayr	Venice, Teatro Sant'Angelo	16 January 1797
Artemisia	Artemisia regina di Caria	dramma serio per musica	Domenico Cimarosa	Naples, Real Teatro San Carlo	12 June 1797
===	Consalvo di Cordova	opera seria	Giuseppe Maria Curcio (Curci)	Naples, Real Teatro San Carlo	13 August 1797
Alceste	Alceste	tragedia per musica	Marcos Antônio Portugal	Venice, Teatro alla Fenice	26 December 1798
mother	Chant national du 14 juillet 1800	operatic-patriotic hymn-scene	Étienne-Nicolas Méhul	Paris, Hôtel des Invalides (Temple de Mars)	14 July 1800
Venere	Pimmalione	dramma lirico	Luigi Cherubini	Paris, Théâtre des Tuileries	30 November 1809

== Sources ==
- Bruno Belli, Giuseppina Grassini. Del canto più soave e drammatico inimitabile modello, Varese, Macchione editore, 2019, ISBN 978-88-6570-589-6.
- Salvatore Caruselli (ed), Grande enciclopedia della musica lirica, vol 4, Longanesi &C. Periodici S.p.A., Roma
- Rodolfo Celletti, Storia del belcanto, Discanto Edizioni, Fiesole, 1983
- Max Gallo, Napoléon, Paris, Edition Robert Laffont, 1997, ISBN 2-221-09796-3 (quoted from the Italian translation, Arnoldo Mondadori Editore, Biblioteca Storica del quotidiano Il Giornale)
- André Gavoty, La Grassini, Paris, 1947
- Giovanni Morelli, “«E voi pupille tenere», uno sguardo furtivo, errante, agli «Orazi» di Domenico Cimarosa e altri”, essay included in Teatro dell’Opera's Programme for the performances of Gli Orazi e i Curiazi, Rome, 1989.
- Stanley Sadie (ed), The New Grove Dictionary of Opera, Oxford University Press, 1992, vol 4, ad nomen
- Stendhal, Vie de Rossini, Paris, Boulland, 1824 (quoted from: Life of Rossini (translated by Richard N. Coe), London, Calder & Boyars, 1970)
- This article is a substantial translation from Giuseppina Grassini in the Italian Wikipedia.
