= Matteo Babini =

Italian opera singer

Matteo Antonio Babini (19 February 1754 – 22 September 1816), also known by the family name of Babbini, was a leading Italian tenor of the late 18th-century, and a teacher of singing and stage art.

== Life and career ==
Matteo Babini was born in Bologna on 19 February 1754.

After studying in his town with Arcangelo Cortoni, he made his début at Modena probably in 1770 or 1771, at the age of 16 or 17, as a second tenor. It is likely he sang in a revival of Paisiello's Demetrio.

After performing in several Italian theatres, most notably in the Teatro San Benedetto in Venice, Babini was engaged, between 1777 and 1781, to appear at Berlin's Court and, later, to perform works by Paisiello in Saint Petersburg. While there, he was popular performing in Paisiello's operas, even some in the comic genre with which he was not associated while in Italy.

Babini went on to perform all around Europe, including Lisbon, Madrid, Vienna, and London. In 1786, in London, he took part in the premiere of Cherubini's Giulio Sabino.

His career in Italy continued successfully through the nineties, with highlights including his part in the premiere of Cimarosa's Gli Orazi e i Curiazi, where he played the part of the villainous hero Marcus Horatius.

Babini retired from the stage in 1803, though he was still in demand for premiere performances by such composers as Zingarelli and Bertoni.

Having settled again in his native town, after an Italian career based almost wholly around Venice, he then proceeded to teach. In addition to singing, he also taught the stage art by which he had so much distinguished himself. One of his pupils was a teenaged Gioachino Rossini, who would recount, to Ferdinand Hiller in his old age, the story of his juvenile fancies to become a singer and of his meeting the great tenor.

Babini died in Bologna on 22 September 1816.

== Artistic contributions ==
Matteo Babini played a key part in the recovery, towards the end of the 18th century, of the expressive character of operatic singing which, had been losing favour to the vocal acrobatics of the castrati and the higher notes of the sopranos. Being a baritonal tenor with a very narrow range, and not being particularly versed in coloratura, Babini felt at ease in only one octave (although, eventually, Orazi's only virtuoso aria was assigned to him).

Babini's main contributions to the renaissance of operatic art were through his role of actor-singer, and he became known for the exuberant style of his recitals, the realism of his acting, and his imposing stage presence – he was said to be tall, blond, and slender, and with a very fine countenance.

According to Giovanni Morelli, Babini's repertoire developed following his stays in Paris during the crucial moments of the French Revolution, in the years 1787 to 1789, and in 1792, and shifted towards the new-fashioned historical drama and the Rousseau monodrama cantata, especially Pimmalione, which he performed around the major Italian theatres with a huge success.

In his interpretations, Babbini endeavoured to portray "peoples' customs and heroes' vicissitudes", and in the Venetian premiere of Cimarosa's Oriazi he went on the stage wearing historical costume, "which the audience remained so much satisfied with, that thenceforth theatres turned it into an invariable standard".

Babini partnered, amongst others, Crescentini, Grassini, Banti, Pacchiarotti, and also the tenor Giacomo David, with whom he often alternated the same parts.

== Roles ==
The following list is not complete:

Role	Opera	Genre	Composer	Theatre	Premiere
Giocondo	L'astratto	Dramma giocoso	Niccolò Piccinni	Bologna, Teatro Formagliari	autumn 1772
Anassandro	Merope	Dramma per musica (opera seria)	Giacomo Insanguine	Venice, Teatro (Grimani) San Benedetto	26 December 1772
Osmino	Solimano	Dramma per musica	Johann Gottlieb Naumann	Venice, Teatro (Grimani) San Benedetto	3 January 1773
Clearco	Antigono	Dramma per musica (opera seria)	Pasquale Anfossi	Venice, Teatro (Gallo) San Benedetto	23 May 1773
Amenofi (or Amasi)	La Nitteti	Dramma per musica	Giovanni Paisiello	Saint Petersburg, Court Theatre (Oranienbaum Palace)	c 17/28 January 1778
Licomede	Achille in Sciro	Dramma per musica	Giovanni Paisiello	Saint Petersburg, Court Theatre (Oranienbaum)	26 January/6 February 1778
Valerio	Lo sposo burlato	Dramma giocoso-pasticcio	Giovanni Paisiello	Saint Petersburg, Court Theatre (Peterhof Palace)	13/24 July 1778
Phenive	Demetrio	Opera	Giovanni Paisiello	Tsarskoye Selo, Court Theatre	13/24 June 1779
Gelino	La finta amante	Opera comica	Giovanni Paisiello	Mogilëv, Theatre (name unknown)	24 May/5 June 1780
Fronimo	Alcide al bivio	Festa teatrale	Giovanni Paisiello	Saint Petersburg, Court Theatre (Hermitage)	25 November/6 December 1780
Artaserse (not verified)	Artaserse	Dramma per musica (opera seria)	Giacomo Rust	Perugia, Teatro Civico (inauguration)	1781
Sarabes	Zemira	Dramma per musica	Pasquale Anfossi	Venice, Teatro (Gallo) San Benedetto	26 December 1781
Scitalce-Sardanapalo	Arbace	Dramma per musica (opera seria)	Giovanni Battista Borghi	Venice, Teatro (Gallo) San Benedetto	3 January 1782
Ormondo	Il disertore francese	Dramma per musica (opera seria)	Francesco Bianchi	Venice, Teatro (Gallo) San Benedetto	26 December 1784
Alessandro Magno	Alessandro nell'Indie	Dramma per musica (opera seria)	Francesco Bianchi	Venice, Teatro (Gallo) San Benedetto	28 January 1785
–	Giulio Sabino	Dramma per musica (opera seria)	Luigi Cherubini	London, King's Theatre	30 March 1786
Porsenna	Il trionfo di Clelia	Dramma per musica	Angelo Tarchi	Turin, Nuovo Teatro Regio	26 December 1786
Volodimiro	Volodimiro	Dramma per musica	Domenico Cimarosa	Turin, Nuovo Teatro Regio	20 January 1787
Artabano (not verified)	Artaserse	Dramma per musica (opera seria)	Francesco Bianchi	Padua, Teatro Nuovo e della Nobiltà	11 June 1787
Bruto	La morte di Cesare	Dramma serio per musica	Francesco Bianchi	Venice, Teatro (Grimani) San Samuele	27 December 1788
Amenofi (or Amasi)	Nitteti	Dramma per musica (opera seria)	Ferdinando Bertoni	Venice, Teatro (Grimani) San Samuele di Venezia	6 February 1789
Giasone	Gli Argonauti in Colco ossia La conquista del vello d'oro	Dramma per musica	Giuseppe Gazzaniga	Venice, Teatro (Grimani) San Samuele	26 December 1789
Pimmalione	Pimmalione	Scena drammatica in musica	Giovanni Battista Cimador	Venice, Teatro (Grimani) San Samuele	26 January 1790
Alessandro	Apelle	Dramma serio per musica (1st version)	Niccolò Antonio Zingarelli	Venice, Teatro alla Fenice	18 November 1793
Virginio	Virginia	Tragedia per musica (opera seria)	Felice Alessandri	Venice, Teatro alla Fenice	26 December 1793
Alcéo	Saffo o sia I riti d'Apollo Leucadio	Dramma per musica	Giovanni Simone Mayr	Venice, Teatro alla Fenice	17 February 1794
Ulisse	Penelope	Dramma per musica	Domenico Cimarosa	Naples, Teatro del Fondo	26 December 1794
Marco Orazio	Gli Orazi e i Curiazi	Tragedia per musica (1st version)	Domenico Cimarosa	Venice, Teatro alla Fenice	26 December 1796
Mentore	Telemaco nell'isola di Calipso	Dramma per musica	Giovanni Simone Mayr	Venice, Teatro Sant'Angelo	16 January 1797
Mitridate	La morte di Mitridate	Dramma per musica (opera seria)	Niccolò Antonio Zingarelli	Venice, Teatro alla Fenice	27 May 1797
protagonista	Inno patriottico per la guardia civica	Anthem	Catterino Cavos	Venice, Teatro alla Fenice	14 September 1797
Edipo	Edipo a Colono	Tragedia per musica (opera seria)	Niccolò Antonio Zingarelli	Venice, Teatro alla Fenice	26 December 1802
Publio Scipione Africano	La caduta della nuova Cartagine	Dramma per musica	Giuseppe Farinelli	Venice, Teatro alla Fenice	5 February 1803
Mercurio	Adria consolata	Festa teatrale (cantata drammatica)	Ferdinando Bertoni	Venice, Teatro alla Fenice	12 February 1803
