= Giacomo David =

Italian opera singer (1750–1830)

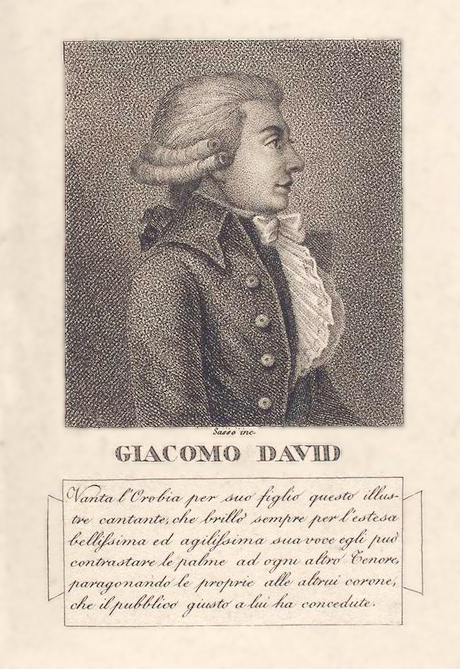

Giacomo David (born Giacomo Davide; 1750 in Presezzo – 1830 in Bergamo), was a leading Italian tenor of the late 18th and early 19th centuries.

== Biography ==
Probably self-taught as a singer, he studied composition in Naples with Nicola Sala, and began his career in the early 1770s appearing on the stages of major Italian theatres such as the Teatro Regio in Turin, the Teatro San Carlo in Naples, and the Teatro San Benedetto in Venice. Here he participated in the inauguration of the newly erected theatre La Fenice, in 1792, performing the role of Eraclide in Paisiello's I giochi di Agrigento. After having made his debut at Milan's Teatro alla Scala in 1782, he became a regular performer there at the beginning of the new century.

In 1791 Davide travelled to London, where the -e in his surname seems to have been dropped, and where he appeared at the King's Theatre as the protagonist of Paisiello's Pirro, one of his favourite roles. On 17 May 1791, he took part in a charity concert in the Hannover Square Rooms, where he executed the tenor aria "Cara deh torna", specially composed for the occasion by Joseph Haydn.

In 1801, he took part in the inauguration of Trieste's Regio Teatro Nuovo, performing two premières on 20 and 21 April: Antonio Salieri's Annibale in Capua (Scipione) and Simon Mayr's Ginevra di Scozia (Polinesso).

His career was very long, continuing into the early twenty years of the 19th century, with a repertoire based upon such composers as Paisiello, Mayr, Ferdinando Bertoni, Domenico Cimarosa, Pietro Alessandro Guglielmi, Giuseppe Sarti, Niccolò Antonio Zingarelli, and Francesco Bianchi. In many operas he worked alongside the castrati Girolamo Crescentini and Gaspare Pacchierotti, and the soprano Brigida Banti, who shared common artistic trends with him.

In France, where he appeared opposite Isabella Colbran in Otello, David came to be known as Giacomo le père ("Giacomo the father"), because his son Giovanni David was also pursuing a successful career in opera.

David can be considered as the initiator of the Bergamo tenor school which was going to produce such notable singers as Andrea Nozzari and Giacomo's aforesaid son, Giovanni (who were also actual pupils of his), Domenico Donzelli, Giovanni Battista Rubini, and Marco Bordogni.

David died in 1830.

== Artistic features ==
Giacomo David represents the typical baritonal tenor of the late 18th century, gifted with remarkable voice volume, but not lacking in high-pitching capability, though singing sharp notes in falsettone. He had mastery of coloratura for which he was famous: "he was able to compete with the castratos in the florid music and far exceed them in his dramatic intensity", and, by 1786 he was the first tenor in the history of Turin's Teatro Regio that was paid more than the primo uomo during the carnival season. "Here was a sign that, with the castrati in decline, the tenor voice was beginning to engage the audience's interest as more than the stereotype utterance of kings and old men ...". In fact, David's popularity was enormous and, along with his contemporaries, Matteo Babini and Giovanni Ansani, he contributed "[to lay] the foundation of the forthcoming myth of the tenor" which would be established during the Romantic era.

== Operatic roles ==
The list below is not exhaustive, but includes his most significant performances.

role	opera	genre	composer	theatre	date of performance
Lucindo	La cameriera astuta	opera buffa	Alessandro Felici	Bergamo, Teatro di Bergamo	carnival, 1770
Conte Lelio	La sposa fedele	opera buffa	uncertain	Vicenza, Teatro delle Grazie	"fiera dell'anno", 1771
Conte Ernesto	L'incognita perseguitata	opera buffa	Pasquale Anfossi	Milan, Regio-Ducal Teatro	summer, 1773
Rodomonte	Le pazzie d'Orlando	dramma per musica (opera seria)	Pietro Guglielmi	Milan, Regio-Ducal Teatro	autumn, 1773
Trasimede	Merope	dramma per musica (opera seria)	Pietro Guglielmi	Turin, Teatro Regio	26 December 1774
Idreno	L'isola di Alcina ossia Alcina e Ruggiero	dramma per musica (opera seria)	Felice Alessandri	Turin, Nuovo Teatro Regio	26 January 1775
Artabano	Artaserse	dramma per musica (opera seria)	Giovanni Battista Borghi	Venice, Teatro San Benedetto	26 December 1775
Alceo	Aristo e Temira	cantata pastorale (dramma per musica)	Ferdinando Bertoni	Venice, Teatro San Benedetto	3 January 1776
Creonte	Antigona	dramma per musica (opera seria)	Michele Mortellari	Venice, Teatro San Benedetto	11 May 1776
Arsace	Calliroe	dramma per musica (opera seria)	Giacomo Rust	Padua, Teatro di Padua	June, 1776
Dario	La disfatta di Dario	dramma per musica (opera seria)	Giovanni Paisiello	Bologna, Teatro Zagnoni	spring, 1777
Pompeo	Farnace	dramma per musica (opera seria)	Giuseppe Sarti	Bologna, Teatro Zagnoni	spring, 1777
Cavaliere Aquilanto	Il zotico incivilito	opera buffa	Pasquale Anfossi	Bologna, Teatro Zagnoni	autumn, 1777
Artabano	Artaserse	dramma per musica (opera seria)	Ferdinando Bertoni	Lucca, Teatro di Lucca	autumn, 1777
Massimo	Ezio	dramma per musica (opera seria)	Ferdinando Bertoni	Lucca, Teatro di Lucca	autumn, 1777
Antigone	Eumene	dramma per musica (opera seria)	Giovanni Battista Borghi	Venice, Teatro San Benedetto	26 December 1777
Medonte	Medonte, re di Epiro	dramma per musica (opera seria)	Giuseppe Radicchi	Venice, Teatro San Benedetto	3 January 1778
Dario	La disfatta di Dario	dramma per musica (opera seria)	Tommaso Traetta	Venice, Teatro San Benedetto	carnival, 1778
Alessandro	Alessandro nell'Indie	dramma per musica (opera seria)	Luigi Marescalchi	Venice, Teatro San Benedetto	27 May 1778
Papirio	Quinto Fabio	dramma per musica (opera seria)	Ferdinando Bertoni	Padua, Teatro Nuovo	June, 1778
Cefeo	Andromeda	dramma per musica (opera seria)	Giuseppe Colla	Florence, Teatro della Pergola	autumn, 1778
Jarba	Didone abbandonata	dramma per musica (opera seria)	"diversi"	Florence, Teatro della Pergola	autumn, 1778
Osroa	Adriano in Siria	dramma per musica (opera seria)	Giuseppe Sarti	Rome, Teatro Argentina	carnival, 1779
Antigono	Antigono	dramma per musica (opera seria)	Giuseppe Gazzaniga	Rome, Teatro Argentina	carnival, 1779
Amasi	La Nitteti	dramma per musica (opera seria)	Luigi Gatti	Mantua, Teatro Regio-Ducal	spring, 1779
Medonte	Medonte, re di Epiro	dramma per musica (opera seria)	Giuseppe Sarti	Florence, Teatro Cocomero	summer, 1779
Tito Manlio	Tito Manlio	dramma per musica (opera seria)	Giovanni Battista Borghi	Rome, Teatro Argentina	carnival, 1780
Medonte	Medonte	dramma per musica (opera seria)	Josef Mysliveček	Rome, Teatro Argentina	26 January 1780
Cajo Mario	Cajo Mario	dramma per musica (opera seria)	Domenico Cimarosa	Mantua, Regio-Ducal	spring, 1780
Alessandro	Alessandro nell'Indie	dramma per musica (opera seria)	Domenico Cimarosa	Rome, Teatro Argentina	11 February 1781
Cajo Mario	Il Cajo Mario	dramma per musica (opera seria)	Ferdinando Bertoni	Venice, Teatro San Benedetto	24 May 1781
Learco	Reifile	dramma per musica (opera seria)	Felice Alessandri	Padua, Teatro Nuovo	June, 1781
Giunio Bruto	Giunio Bruto	dramma per musica (opera seria)	Domenico Cimarosa	Verona, Accademia Filarmonica	autumn, 1781
Dario	La disfatta di Dario	dramma per musica (opera seria)	Giovanni Paisiello	Genoa, Teatro Sant'Agostino	carnival, 1782
Alessandro	Alessandro e Timoteo	dramma per musica (opera seria)	Giuseppe Sarti	Parma, Teatrino di Corte	6 April 1782
Mitridate	Tigrane	dramma per musica (opera seria)	anonymous	Genoa, Teatro Sant'Agostino	summer, 1782
Prisco	La Circe	dramma per musica (opera seria)	Domenico Cimarosa	Milan, La Scala	26 December 1782
Palmoro	L'Idalide o sia La vergine del sole	dramma per musica (opera seria)	Giuseppe Sarti	Milan, La Scala	8 January 1783
Sabino	Epponia	dramma per musica (opera seria)	Giuseppe Giordani	Novara, Teatro Nuovo	spring, 1783
Medonte	Medonte, re di Epiro	dramma per musica (opera seria)	Gaetano Andreozzi	Alessandria, Teatro d'Alessandria	October, 1783
Agamennone	Briseide	dramma per musica (opera seria)	Francesco Bianchi	Turin, Teatro Regio	27 December 1783
Ircano	Amaionne	dramma per musica (opera seria)	Bernardino Ottani	Turin, Teatro Regio	24 January 1784
Cajo Mario	Cajo Mario	dramma per musica (opera seria)	Francesco Bianchi	Naples, Teatro San Carlo	30 May 1784
Ariodante	Artenice	dramma per musica (opera seria)	Giacomo Tritto	Naples, Teatro San Carlo	13 August 1784
Catone	Catone in Utica	tragedia per musica	Francesco Antonelli Torre	Naples, Teatro San Carlo	4 November 1784
Antigono	Antigono	dramma per musica (opera seria)	Giovanni Paisiello	Naples, Teatro San Carlo	12 January 1785
Rodoaldo	Ricimero	dramma per musica (opera seria)	Nicola Antonio Zingarelli	Venice, Teatro San Benedetto	5 May 1785
Agamennone	Ifigenia in Aulde	dramma per musica (opera seria)	Angelo Tarchi	Padua, Teatro Nuovo	June, 1785
Artabano	Artaserse	dramma per musica (opera seria)	Ferdinando Bertoni	Brescia, Accademia degli Erranti	summer, 1785
Ormodno	Il disertore	dramma per musica (opera seria)	Francesco Bianchi	Verona, Accademia Filarmonica	autumn, 1785
Learco	Erifile	dramma per musica (opera seria)	Carlo Monza	Turin, Teatro Regio	26 December 1785
Palmoro	Idalide	dramma per musica (opera seria)	Salvatore Rispoli	Turin, Teatro Regio	28 January 1786
Clistene	Olimpia	dramma per musica (opera seria)	Alessio Prati	Naples, Teatro San Carlo	6 June 1786
Tito	Giulio Sabino	dramma per musica (opera seria)	Giuseppe Sarti	Naples, Teatro San Carlo	13 August 1786
Mesenzio	Mesenzio, re d'Etruria	dramma per musica (opera seria)	Francesco Bianchi	Naples, Teatro San Carlo	4 November 1786
Pirro	Pirro	dramma per musica (opera seria)	Giovanni Paisiello	Naples, Teatro San Carlo	12 January 1787
Adrasto	Laocoonte	dramma per musica (opera seria)	Pietro Guglielmi	Naples, Teatro San Carlo	30 May 1787
Asdrubale	Scipione Africano	dramma per musica (opera seria)	Francesco Bianchi	Naples, Teatro San Carlo	13 August 1787
Attalo	Ariarate	dramma per musica (opera seria)	Angelo Tarchi	Naples, Teatro San Carlo	4 November 1787
Teseo	Fedra	dramma per musica (opera seria)	Domenico Cimarosa	Naples, Teatro San Carlo	January, 1788
Artabano	Artaserse	dramma per musica (opera seria)	Ferdinando Bertoni	Cremona, Teatro della Niblie Società	30 May 1788
Araspe	Didone abbandonata	dramma per musica (opera seria)	Pasquale Anfossi	Naples, Teatro San Carlo	30 May 1788
Latino	Enea e Lavinia	dramma per musica (opera seria)	Pietro Guglielmo	Naples, Teatro San Carlo	August, 1788
Adrasto	Il Rinaldo	dramma per musica	Pëtr Alekseevič Skokov	Naples, Teatro San Carlo	4 November 1788
Catone	Catone in Utica	dramma per musica (opera seria)	Giovanni Paisiello	Naples, Teatro San Carlo	1 January 1789
Flavio Valente	Ademira	dramma per musica (opera seria)	Pietro Guglielmi	Naples, Teatro San Carlo	30 May 1789
Rodoaldo	Ricimero	opera seria	Giacomo Siri	Naples, Teatro San Carlo	13 August 1789
Alessandro	Alessandro nell'Indie	dramma per musica (opera seria)	Pietro Guglielmi	Naples, Teatro San Carlo	4 November 1789
Pirro	Pirro	dramma per musica (opera seria)	Giovanni Paisiello	Naples, Teatro San Carlo	January, 1790
Lindoro	Nina	opera buffa	Giovanni Paisiello	Naples, Teatro Fiorentini	1790
Aminta	Aminta	dramma per musica (opera seria)	Pietro Guglielmi	Naples, unknown venue	1790
Ormondo	Il disertore	dramma per musica (opera seria)	"vari"	Genoa, Teatro Sant'Agostino	spring, 1790
Pirro	Pirro	dramma per musica (opera seria)	Giovanni Paisiello	Genoa, Teatro Sant'Agostino	spring, 1790
Dario	La disfatta di Dario	dramma per musica (opera seria)	Giuseppe Giordani	Naples, Teatro San Carlo	13 August 1790
Pirro	Pirro	dramma per musica (opera seria)	Giovanni Paisiello	Bologna, Teatro Zagnoni	autumn, 1790
Arsace	La morte di Semiramide	tragedia in musica	Giuseppe Prati	Venice, Teatro San Benedetto	16 November 1791
Seleuco	Seleuco, re di Siria	dramma per musica (opera seria)	Francesco Bianchi	Venice, Teatro San Benedetto	26 December 1791
Teseo	Il sacrifizi di Creta ossia Arianna e Teseo	dramma giocoso per musica	Peter Winter	Venice, Teatro San Benedetto	13 February 1792
Pirro	Pirro	dramma per musica (opera seria)	Giovanni Paisiello	Venice, Teatro San Benedetto	carnival, 1792
Seleuco	Seleuco re di Siria	dramma per musica (opera seria)	Francesco Bianchi	Venice, Teatro San Benedetto	carnival, 1792
Eraclide	I giuochi di Agrigento	dramma per musica	Giovanni Paisiello	Venice, Teatro La Fenice (inauguration)	16 May 1792
Valentiniano III	Ezio	dramma per musica (opera seria)	Angelo Tarchi	Vicenza, Teatro Nuovo	summer, 1792
Alessandro	Alessandro nell'Indie	dramma per musica (opera seria)	Francesco Bianchi	Venice, Teatro La Fenice	autumn, 1792
Atar	Tarara o sia La virtù premiata	dramma per musica (opera seria)	Francesco Bianchi	Venice, Teatro La Fenice	26 December 1792
Alfonso IV	Ines de Castro	dramma per musica	Giuseppe Giordani	Venice, Teatro La Fenice	28 January 1793
Pirro	Pirro	dramma per musica (opera seria)	Giovanni Paisiello	Florence, Teatro della Pergola	spring, 1793
Teseo	I sacrifizi di Creta	dramma per musica (opera seria)	Peter Winter	Florence, Teatro della Pergola	spring, 1793
Cajo Mario	Cajo Mario	dramma per musica (opera seria)	anonymous	Livorno, Accademia degli Avvalorati	autumn, 1793
Medonte	Medonte, re di Epiro	dramma per musica (opera seria)	anonymous	Livorno, Accademia degli Avvalorati	autumn, 1793
Valentiniano III	Ezio	dramma per musica (opera seria)	Angelo Tarchi	Livorno, Accademia degli Avvalorati	autumn, 1793
Artabano	Artaserse	dramma per musica (opera seria)	anonymous	Genoa, Teatro Sant'Agostino	carnival, 1794
Cajo Mario	Cajo Mario	dramma per musica (opera seria)	anonymous	Reggio Emilia, Teatro Pubblico	spring, 1794
Sabino	Epponia	dramma per musica (opera seria)	Sebastiano Nasolini	Bergamo, Teatro Ricciardi	August, 1794
Cajo Mario	Cajo Mario	dramma per musica (opera seria)	anonymous	Trieste, Teatro della Città e Porto-Franco	autumn, 1794
Pirro	Pirro	dramma per musica (opera seria)	Giovanni Paisiello	Trieste, Teatro della Città e Porto-Franco	autumn, 1794
Seleuco	Seleuco re di Siria	dramma per musica (opera seria)	Francesco Bianchi	Brescia, Accademia degl'Erranti	carnival, 1795
Latino	Il trionfo di Camilla	dramma per musica (opera seria)	Pietro Guglielmi	Naples, Teatro San Carlo	30 May 1795
Surena	Arsinoe	dramma per musica (opera seria)	Gaetano Andreozzi	Naples, Teatro San Carlo	13 August 1795
Publio Orazio	Gli Orazi e i Curiazi	azione tragica (opera seria)	Nicola Antonio Zingarelli	Naples, Teatro San Carlo	4 November 1795
Lucio Papirio	Lucio Papirio	dramma per musica (opera seria)	Gaetano Marinelli	Naples, Teatro San Carlo	January, 1796
Ottaviano	La morte di Cleopatra	dramma per musica (opera seria)	Pietro Guglielmi	Naples, San Carlo	June, 1796
Eggardo	Elfrida	dramma per musica (opera seria)	Giovanni Paisiello	Venice, Teatro La Fenice	May, 1796
Neleo	Artemisia regina di Caria	dramma serio per musica	Domenico Cimarosa	Naples, Teatro San Carlo	12 June 1797
Zulema	Consalvo di Cordova	opera seria	Giuseppe Maria Curcio	Naples, Teatro San Carlo	13 August 1797
Ulisse	Andromaca	dramma per musica	Giovanni Paisiello	Naples, Teatro San Carlo	4 November 1797
Antigono	Antigono	dramma per musica	Antonio De Santis	Naples, Teatro San Carlo	12 January 1798
Ulisse	Andromaca	dramma per musica (opera seria)	Giovanni Paisiello	Venice, Teatro La Fenice	May, 1798
Sesostri	Le feste d'Iside	dramma per musica (opera seria)	Sebastiano Nasolini	Trieste, Teatro Regio	autumn, 1798
Don Rodrigo	Ines de Castro	opera seria	Nicola Antonio Zingarelli	Milan, Teatro alla Canobbiana	11 October 1798
Bruto	Bruto	dramma per musica (opera seria)	Giuseppe Nicolini	Genoa, Teatro Sant'Agostino	carnival, 1799
Ormondo	Il disertore	dramma per musica (opera seria)	Angelo Tarchi	Genoa, Teatro Sant'Agostino	carnival, 1799
Ulisse	Andromaca	dramma per musica (opera seria)	Giovanni Paisiello	Padua, Teatro Nuovo	June, 1799
Kaibar	Idante	dramma per musica (opera seria)	Marcos Portugal	Milan, La Scala	carnival, 1800
Boleslao	La Lodoiska	dramma per musica (opera seria)	Simon Mayr	Milan, La Scala	carnival, 1800
Mitridate	La morte di Mitridate	dramma per musica (opera seria)	Sebastiano Nasolini	Brescia, Teatro Nazionale	summer, 1800
Scipione	Annibale in Capua	dramma serio per musica	Antonio Salieri	Trieste, Regio Teatro Nuovo(inauguration)	20 April 1801
Polinesso	Ginevra di Scozia	dramma eroico-serio per musica	Simon Mayr	Trieste, Regio Teatro Nuovo (inauguration)	21 April 1801
Nerestano	Zaira ossia Il trionfo della religione	dramma tragico-serio per musica	Vincenzo Federici	Milan, Teatro Carcano(inauguration)	3 September 1803
Ottone	Adelasia e Aleramo	melodramma serio	Giovanni Simone Mayr	Milan, Teatro alla Scala	26 December 1806
Marco Albino	I Gauri	melodramma eroico	Carlo Mellara	Venice, Teatro alla Fenice	22 February 1810
Genio della Francia	Il pegno di pace	cantata a 3 voci	Francesco Caffi	Venice, Teatro La Fenice	11 March 1810
Eacide	Il salto di Leucade	opera seria	Luigi Mosca	Naples, Teatro San Carlo	15 January 1812
