= Brigida Banti =

Italian opera singer

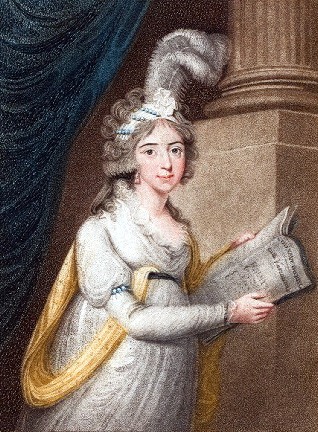
Portrait by Joseph Singleton after John Hopkins (1797)

Brigida Banti (née Giorgi; c. 1757–1806), best known by her husband's surname and her stage-name, as Brigida Banti, was an Italian soprano.

== Biography ==
=== Obscure beginnings ===
Her origins are rather obscure and the data on her birth are very dubious: she is thought to have been born in Crema, Lombardy, but some sources say she may have been born in Monticelli d'Ongina, a village in the province of Piacenza, which is located nearer to Cremona, in 1756 or possibly in 1758. She is the daughter of Carlo Giorgi, a street mandolin player; she too started her career as a street singer, either following her father around, or, according to different accounts, joining in with the double-bassist Domenico Dragonetti, when he was still a boy. The only established fact is that, in 1777–1778, on her travels around southern Europe, she reached Paris where a meeting with an important person in the profession completely was to change her life. However, sources are at variances as to the identity of that person. According to some of them, it was composer Antonio Sacchini, who quickly trained her and introduced to the Opéra Comique, while other sources suggest that she caught the attention of Anne-Pierre-Jacques Devismes, the shortly to-be Director of the Académie Royale de Musique, and the Opéra ought to have been the theatre she was engaged for. Details about her Parisian sojourn are scant and uncertain. She moved to London at an undetermined date, and there she met dancer and choreographer Zaccaria Banti, whom she married in Amsterdam in 1779 and whose surname she adopted as her stage-name.

=== The great European career ===
After dropping round in Vienna in 1780, Banti decided to return to Italy when she was engaged at the Teatro San Benedetto in Venice for the 1782–1783 carnival season. Her performances in the premières of Piramo e Tisbe by Francesco Bianchi (who was to become her favourite composer), and Attalo, re di Bitinia by Giuseppe Sarti, as well as in a revival of Bertoni's Orfeo ed Euridice were very successful by all accounts, raising enthusiasm in a listener out of the ordinary, such as the Irish tenor Michael Kelly. After Venice, she later sang in Turin, Milan, in Venice again, and also, in 1786–1787, in Warsaw, where she performed in operas by Giordani, Persichini and Tarchi. Finally, in the same 1787, she arrived at Teatro San Carlo in Naples, where she created the role of Sofonisba in Bianchi's Scipione Africano, and also interpreted operas by Paisiello, Anfossi and Guglielmi. In 1789 Banti returned to Venice's Teatro San Benedetto where she was the first protagonist of Anfossi's Zenobia in Palmira, which became one of her favourite roles, as well as Semiramide, a character she created in Bianchi's La vendetta di Nino, at the end of the following year. In June 1792 she took part in the inauguration of the new theatre La Fenice in Venice, opposite the castrato Gaspare Pacchierotti (who exerted a strong artistic influence upon her throughout her career), in the first performance of Paisiello's I giuochi d'Agrigento.

After a brief season in Madrid in 1793, from 1794 to 1802 she was engaged, as the leading soprano, at London's King's Theatre, where she made her début as Semiramide in La vendetta di Nino. There she met Lorenzo Da Ponte, who later reported she had been vulgar, impudent, dissolute and even a drunkard. Specifically, he said that she was "ignorant, foolish and insolent", and that she "took to theatre, where only her voice had led her, all habitudes, manners and morals of an impudent Corisca". He also credited her with a sexual relationship with William Taylor, manager of the King's Theatre. She also met and worked with Haydn in 1795. Haydn had written the concert aria ('New Scene') 'Berenice che fai' for her. Haydn was initially disappointed in her singing saying that “she sang very scanty”. However the premiere of the aria alongside Haydn’s London Symphony was really successful.

After getting back to Italy in 1802 autumn, owing to Elizabeth Billington's return to her country, she remained in demand on stage for some years both at La Scala and at la Fenice. With her health failing, her voice was getting more and more spoilt and she was forced to retire albeit very shortly before her premature death, in 1806. So marvellous and so powerful her very voice had been that her corpse was eventually subjected to an autopsy which revealed two extraordinarily large lungs. She has a painted tomb monument at the Certosa of Bologna. Her son Giuseppe would publish a short biography of her, some sixty years later, in 1869.

== Critical response ==
Despite a lack of classical or theoretical training, Banti's performance was well-received by her contemporaries. Lord Mount Edgcumbe wrote of her in his book Musical Reminiscences: "Her voice was of most extensive compass, rich and even, and without a fault in its whole range – a true voce di petto throughout".

Her singing style, according to Élisabeth Vigée Le Brun, was very similar to the castrato Pacchiarotti in its "expressive intensity".

== Roles created and significant performances ==
The following is a list of significant performances of Banti's career (either world or local premieres).

Role	Opera	Genre	Composer	Theatre	Première's date
Emirena	Attalo Re di Bitinia	dramma per musica (opera seria)	Giuseppe Sarti	Venice, Teatro (Gallo) San Benedetto	26 December 1782
Tisbe	Piramo e Tisbe	dramma per musica	Francesco Bianchi	Venice, Teatro (Gallo) San Benedetto	3 January 1783
Ippodamia	Briseide	dramma per musica (opera seria)	Francesco Bianchi	Turin, Nuovo Teatro Regio	27 December 1783
Emira	Amaionne	dramma per musica	Bernardino Ottani	Turin, Nuovo Teatro Regio	24 January 1784
Arianna	Bacco e Arianna	festa teatrale (cantata)	Angelo Tarchi	Turin, Nuovo Teatro Regio	20 May 1784
Adelina	Il disertore francese	dramma per musica (opera seria)	Francesco Bianchi	Venice, Teatro (Gallo) San Benedetto	26 December 1784
Cleofide	Alessandro nell'Indie	dramma per musica (opera seria)	Francesco Bianchi	Venice, Teatro (Gallo) San Benedetto	28 January 1785
Aricia	Fedra	dramma per musica	Giovanni Paisiello	Naples, Real Teatro San Carlo	1 January 1788
Debora	Debora e Sisara	azione sacra per musica (oratorio, 1st version)	Pietro Alessandro Guglielmi	Naples, Real Teatro San Carlo	13 February 1788
Armida	Il Rinaldo	dramma per musica	Pyotr Alexeyevich Skokov	Naples, Real Teatro San Carlo	4 November 1788
Marzia	Catone in Utica	dramma per musica	Giovanni Paisiello	Naples, Real Teatro San Carlo	1 January 1789
Erismena	Montezuma	pastiche (dramma per musica)	Giacomo Insanguine, Josef Myslivecek, Gian Francesco de Majo, Baldassarre Galuppi and Nicola Zingarelli	Venice, Teatro (Venier) San Benedetto	14 November 1789
Zenobia	Zenobia di Palmira	dramma per musica (opera seria, 1st version)	Pasquale Anfossi	Venice, Teatro (Venier) San Benedetto	26 December 1789
Euterpe	L'armonia	cantata	Pasquale Anfossi	Venice, Teatro (Venier) San Benedetto	11 January 1790
Zenobia	Zenobia in Palmira	dramma per musica	Giovanni Paisiello	Naples, Real Teatro San Carlo	30 May 1790
Semiramide	La vendetta di Nino	dramma per musica (opera seria, 1st version)	Francesco Bianchi	Naples, Real Teatro San Carlo	12 November 1790
Cora	Pizzarro nelle Indie	opera seria	Marcello Bernardini "Marcello da Capua"	Naples, Real Teatro San Carlo	23 January 1791
Emilia	Lucio Papirio	dramma per musica (opera seria)	Gaetano Marinelli	Naples, Real Teatro San Carlo	30 May 1791
Briseide	Briseide	opera	Ferdinando Robuschi	Naples, Real Teatro San Carlo	13 August 1791
Antigona	Antigona	opera seria	Peter von Winter	Naples, Real Teatro San Carlo	4 November 1791
Achinoa	Gionata	oratorio (azione sacra scenica)	Niccolò Piccinni	Naples, Real Teatro San Carlo	4 March 1792
Aspasia	I giuochi d'Agrigento	dramma per musica (1st version)	Giovanni Paisiello	Venice, Teatro alla Fenice (inauguration)	16 May 1792
Astasia	Tarara o sia La virtù premiata	dramma per musica (opera seria)	Francesco Bianchi	Venice, Teatro alla Fenice	26 December 1792
Ines	Ines de Castro	dramma per musica	Giuseppe Giordani "Giordaniello"	Venice, Teatro alla Fenice	28 January 1793
Alceste	Alceste ossia il trionfo dell' amor conjugale	opera seria	Christoph Willibald Gluck	London, King's Theatre in the Haymarket	30 April 1795
Antigona	Antigona	dramma per musica	Francesco Bianchi	King's Theatre Hay-Market	24 May 1796
Evelina	Evelina, or the Triumph of the English over the Romans	serious opera	Antonio Sacchini	London, King's Theatre in the Haymarket	10 January 1797
Zenobia	Zenobia	dramma per musica (opera seria)	Richard Mount-Edgcumbe	London, King's Theatre in the Haymarket	22 May 1800
Ines	Ines de Castro	dramma serio per musica	Vittorio Trento	Leghorn, Imperial Regio Teatro degli Avvalorati	9 November 1803
Clearco (en travesti)	I riti d'Efeso	dramma eroico per musica	Giuseppe Farinelli	Venice, Teatro alla Fenice	26 December 1803
Arsace (en travesti)	Arsace e Semira	dramma eroico (opera seria)	Francesco Gnecco	Venice, Teatro alla Fenice	31 December 1803

== Sources ==
- Bruce Carr, Banti, Brigida Giorgi, in Stanley Sadie (ed), The New Grove Dictionary of Opera, Oxford University Press, 1992, I, pp. 303–304
- Salvatore Caruselli (ed), Grande enciclopedia della musica lirica, vol. 4, Longanesi & C. Periodici, Roma (in Italian)
- Rodolfo Celletti, Storia del belcanto, Discanto Edizioni, Fiesole, 1983 (in Italian)
- Rodolfo Celletti, La Grana della Voce. Opere, direttori e cantanti, Baldini & Castoldi, Milan, 2000 (in Italian)
- Lorenzo Da Ponte, Memorie, Bari, G. Laterza, 1918, now available free in a digital edition c/o Università degli studi di Roma La Sapienza (Biblioteca Italiana); original title: Memorie di Lorenzo da Ponte da Ceneda scritte da esso (New York, 1823–27, enlarged 2/1829–30) (in Italian)
- Mario G. Genesi, Una primadonna tardosettecentesca: B. Giorgi-Banti (1755–1806), Edizioni Pro Loco di Monticelli d'Ongina, 1991, 228 pages (in Italian)
- Harold Rosenthal and John Warrack, The Concise Oxford Dictionary of Opera, Oxford University Press, 1964, 1966, 1972, ad nomen
- Roberto Staccioli, "Giorgi (Banti Giorgi), Brigida", Dizionario Biografico degli Italiani, 2001, volume 55 (in Italian)
- This article is a substantial translation from Brigida Banti in the Italian Wikipedia.
