= Anna Morichelli Bosello =

Italian soprano

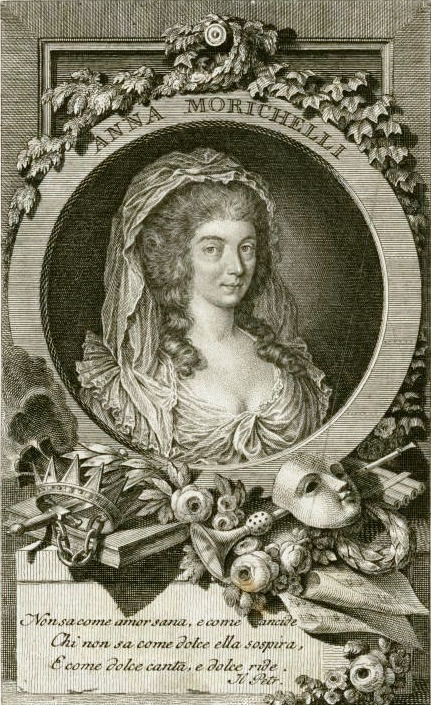
Portrait by Joseph Kreutzinger, engraved by Johann Ernst Mansfeld (c. 1789)

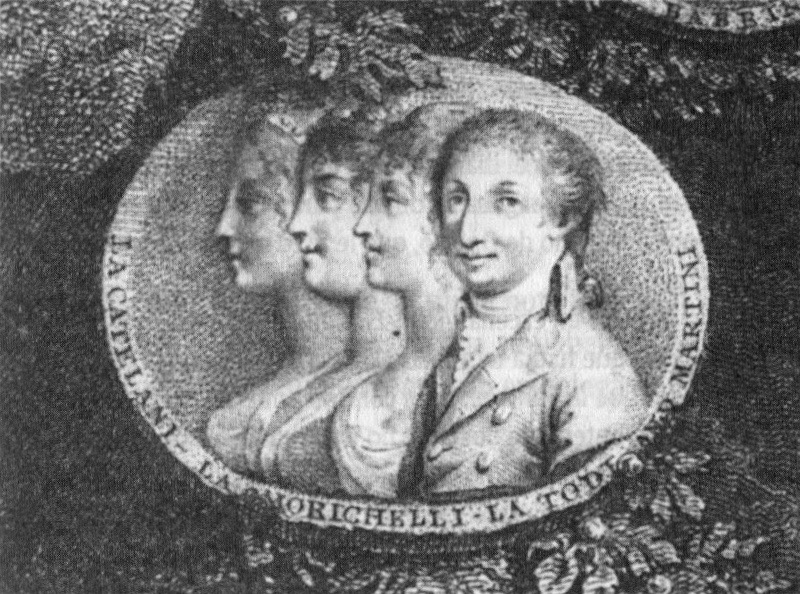
The singers Angelica Catalani, Anna Morichelli and Luísa Todi with composer Vicente Martín y Soler; portrait by Pietro Bettelini after Luigi Scotti (late 18th century)

Anna Morichelli Bosello (née Morichelli; 1745–1800) was an Italian soprano, known for her rivalry with Brigida Banti.

== Life ==
=== Italy ===
Anna Morichelli was born at Reggio in 1760. Being endowed by nature with a pure and flexible voice, she was instructed by Gaetano Guadagni, one of the best sopranists of the day. She made her début at Parma in 1779 with great éclat. After singing at Venice and Milan, she appeared at Vienna in 1781–2, and with difficulty obtained leave from the Emperor to return and fulfil an engagement at Turin.

=== Paris ===
She continued to sing at the chief theatres of Italy, until Giovanni Battista Viotti engaged her for the Théâtre de Monsieur, in Paris, in 1790, where she remained during the years 1791–2. Here she was very highly appreciated, even by such good judges as Pierre Garat.

=== London ===
With this reputation she came to London in 1792, with Brigida Banti. Lorenzo da Ponte, the poet of the London Opera-House, gives a severe description of these two singers in his Memoirs: he calls them 'equals in vice, passions, and dishonesty', though differing in the methods by which they sought to accomplish their designs:

The Morichelli woman had plenty of talent and a notable cultivation of mind. An old fox, she covered her purposes deep under a veil of mystery and finest cunning. She took her measures always at long range, trusted no one, never lost her temper, and though fiercely practising voluptuous indulgences, nevertheless always managed to play the part of a modest and retiring virgin of fifteen. … She was an actress. Her principal divinities were those of all her kind, but in an excessive degree: Pride, Envy, Money.

To musical amateurs, such as Lord Mount-Edgcumbe, Morichelli seemed far below her rival:

She was, they said, a much better musician. So she might be, but never could have been half so delightful a singer, and she was now past her prime; her voice was not true, her taste spoiled by a long residence at Paris, … and her manner and acting were affected. In short, she did not please generally, though there was a strong party for her; and after her second season she went away, leaving behind her, in every print-shop, her portrait, with the flattering but false inscription, "Parti, mà vide che adorata partiva"'.

=== Decline ===
Morichelli returned to Italy in 1794, and soon after retired from the stage.

== See also ==
- La capricciosa corretta

== Sources ==
=== English ===
- Da Ponte, Lorenzo (1959). Memoirs of Lorenzo Da Ponte. Abbott, Elisabeth (trans.). Livingston, Arthur (ed.). New York, NY: Orion Press. pp. 126–130.
- Libby, Denis, and Link, Dorothea (2002). "Morichelli [Bosello], Anna". Grove Music Online. Oxford University Press.
- Marshall, Julian (1900). "Morichelli, Anna". In Grove, George (ed.). A Dictionary of Music and Musicians. Vol. 2. London: Macmillan & Co., Limited. pp. 365–366.
- Rice, John A. "Twin Portraits: Morichelli and Martín y Soler in Vienna, 1787." Newsletter of the Mozart Society of America, 2017, 11–12
- Russo, Joseph Louis (1922). Lorenzo Da Ponte: Poet and Adventurer. New York, NY: Columbia University Press. pp. 89–91.

=== Italian ===
- Bustico, Guido (1922). Il teatro antico di Novara (1695–1873). Novara: «La Tipografica» – Soc. Anon. Coop. p. 33
- Caprioli, Leonella Grasso (2012). "Morichelli, Anna". Dizionario Biografico degli Italiani. Vol. 76. Treccani.it.
- Chiappori, Giuseppe (1818). Serie cronologica delle rappresentazioni drammaticopantomimiche poste sulle scene dei principali teatri di Milano dall'autunno 1776 all'intero autunno 1818. Milan: Giovanni Silvestri. pp. 23, 28, 29, 36, 37, 124, 231, 241.
- Gervasoni, Carlo (1812). Nuova teoria di musica ricavata dall'odierna pratica, ossia Metodo sicuro e facile in pratica per ben apprendere la musica, a cui si fanno precedere varie notizie storico-musicali. Parma: Blanchon. pp. 191–192.
- Pasolini-Zanelli, G. (1888). Il teatro di Faenza: dal 1788 al 1888. Faenza: Pietro Conti. pp. 24–32, 103.
- Wiel, Taddeo (1897). I teatri musicali veneziani del settecento. Catalogo delle opere in musica rappresentate nel secolo XVIII in Venezia (1701–1800). Venice: Fratelli Visentini. pp. lxvii, 350, 356, 357, 358, 368, 466, 467, 473, 474, 481, 482, 486, 494, 559, 572.
- La disfatta de' Mori; dramma per musica, da rappresentarsi nel Regio Teatro di Torino, nel carnovale del 1791. Torino: Onorato Derossi, 1791. p. v.
