= Morichelli =

Morichelli is an Italian surname. Notable people with the surname include:

- Anna Morichelli Bosello (1745–1800), Italian soprano
- Raul Morichelli (born 2002), Italian professional footballer

== See also ==
- Marcelli
