= Pimmalione =

1809 opera by Luigi Cherubini

- Opera by Luigi Cherubini
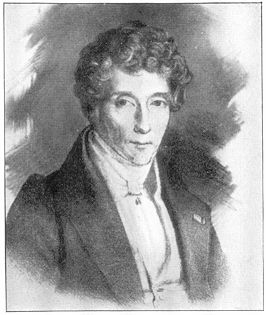
- Luigi Cherubini
- Librettist: Stefano Vestris
- Language: Italian
- Based on: Pygmalion by Rousseau
- Premiere: 30 November 1809; Théâtre des Tuileries, Paris

Pimmalione (Pygmalion) is an opera in one act by Luigi Cherubini, first performed at the Théâtre des Tuileries, Paris, on 30 November 1809. The libretto is an adaptation by Stefano Vestris of Antonio Simeone Sografi's Italian translation of the text Jean-Jacques Rousseau wrote for his scène lyrique Pygmalion (1770). It is based on the Classical legend of the sculptor Pygmalion.

Cherubini, beset by severe depression, financial difficulties, and the hostility of Napoleon, was persuaded to write the one-act opera by two of the Emperor's favourite singers, the famous castrato Girolamo Crescentini and the contralto Giuseppina Grassini (who had been Napoleon's lover), who believed that this might be a way for the composer to regain Napoleon's regard. It was first given in a private performance at the emperor's palace, Les Tuileries. Napoleon was delighted with the work and offered Cherubini a large reward and a commission for another piece.

== Roles ==
Role	Voice type	Premiere cast, 1 September 1810
Pimmalione (Pygmalion)	soprano castrato	Girolamo Crescentini
Galatea	soprano	Augustine Hymm
Venere (Venus)	contralto	Giuseppina Grassini
Amore (Cupid)	boy soprano	Carlo Vestris

== Synopsis ==
The sculptor Pygmalion falls in love with his own work, a statue of Galatea. He prays to the gods of love Venus and Cupid to release him from his passion. While he sleeps, Galatea's statue comes to life, dances and falls in love with Pygmalion. Pygmalion and Galatea celebrate their wedding in the palace of Venus.
