= Lorenzo Gibelli =

Italian composer, singer, and singing teacher

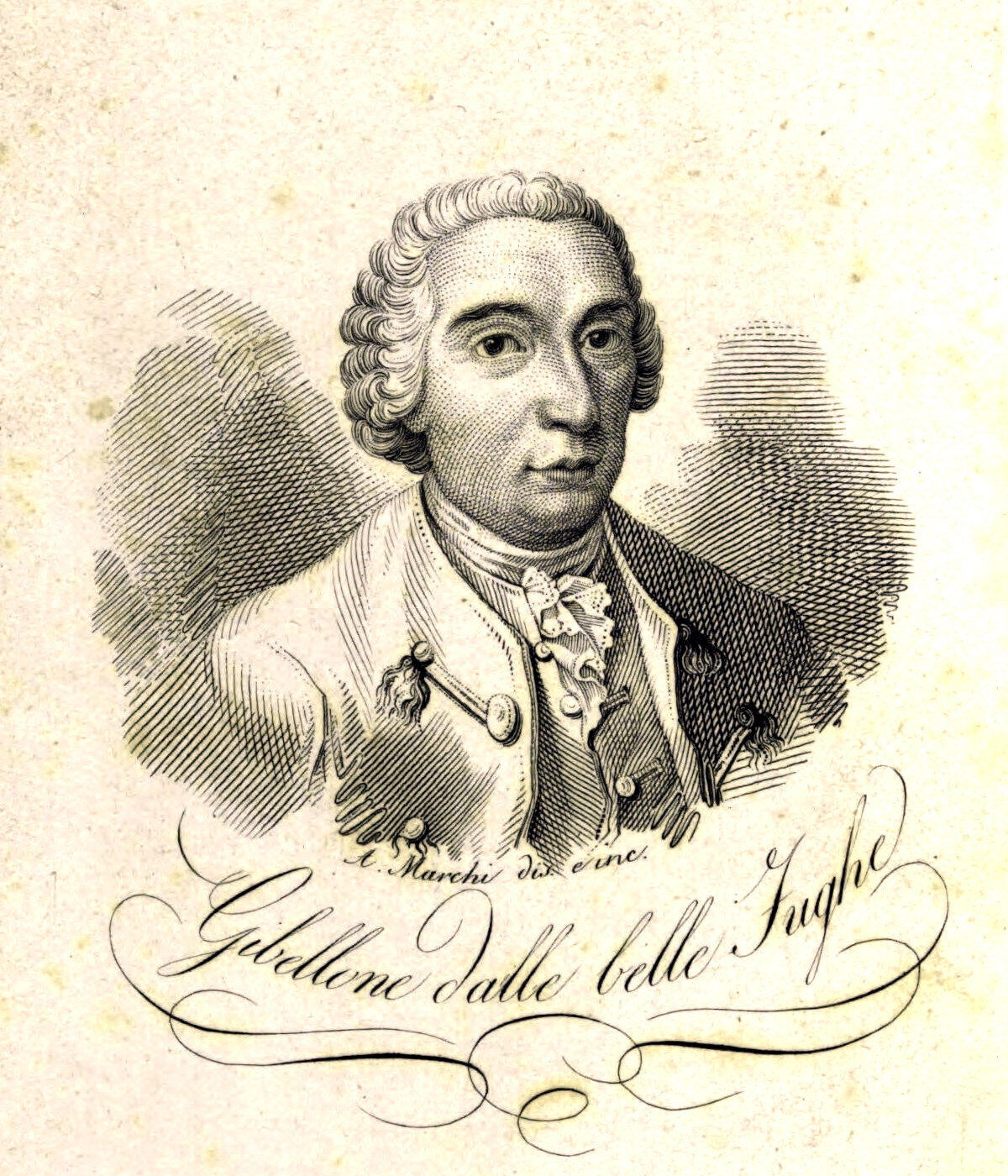
Portrait of Lorenzo Gibelli published in 1830

Lorenzo Maria Petronio Gibelli (24 November 1718 – 5 November 1812) was an Italian composer, singer, and singing teacher. Also known as "Gibellone", he was born in Bologna and studied music there under Giovanni Battista Martini. He was elected to the Accademia Filarmonica di Bologna in 1741 and made a "Principe" (Prince) of the academy in 1753. He served as maestro di cappella of several churches in Bologna, most notably the Chiesa del Santissimo Salvatore. He had only a modest career as an opera singer, despite having a voice of an extraordinarily wide vocal range from bass to the lower tenor notes. However, he became highly regarded as a voice teacher. Amongst his pupils were the castrato singers Girolamo Crescentini and Francesco Roncaglia and the tenor Matteo Babbini. His compositions include five operas, five oratorios, and over 400 pieces of sacred music.
