= Girolamo Crescentini =

Italian opera singer

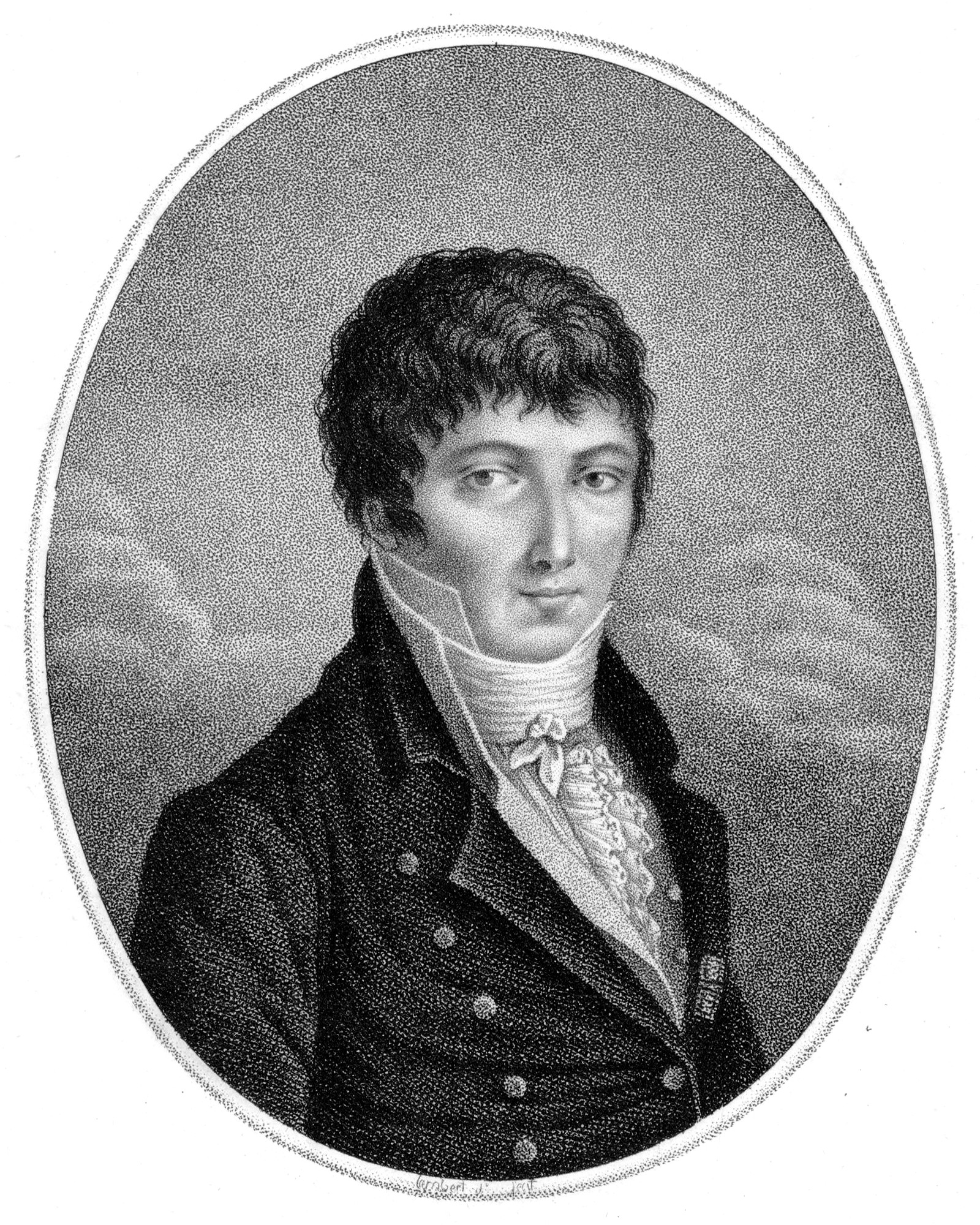
- Born: 2 February 1762; Urbania, Papal States
- Died: 24 April 1846 (aged 84); Naples, Kingdom of the Two Sicilies
- Occupations: Castrato, singing teacher, composer

Girolamo Crescentini (2 February 1762 – 24 April 1846) was an Italian soprano castrato, singing teacher, and composer.

== Biography ==
Crescentini was born in Urbania. He studied in Bologna with the noted teacher Lorenzo Gibelli and made his debut in 1783, quite advanced in years as a castrato. After an unlucky stay in London in 1785, where he did not win much approbation, on his getting back to Italy, he took part in Naples, very successfully, to a revival of Guglielmi’s opera Enea e Lavinia, together with the already famous tenor Giacomo Davide, who shared Crescentini’s artistic inclinations. Thenceforwards, his career made more and more headway, reaching the apex in the nineties, and specially in 1796, when he created two roles which would remain in repertoire for some decades and then famous until present times, in either case by his quasi-pupil Giuseppina Grassini’s side. For him, indeed, Nicola Zingarelli wrote the part of Romeo in his opera Giulietta e Romeo, staged at Milan’s La Scala on 30 January, while Domenico Cimarosa composed the role of Curiazio in Gli Orazi e i Curiazi, staged instead in northern Italy’s second greater theatre, Venice’s La Fenice, on 26 December. For Zingarelli’s opera, Crescentini composed himself an aria, “Ombra adorata aspetta”, which would remain famous as “la Preghiera di Romeo” (Romeo’s Prayer), and which was a greatest enduring success for the singer and a permanent painful grievance for the composer, who referred to it as “my opera’s misfortune” because of its lack of “common sense”. After spending four years in Lisbon, starting from 1797, as the director of the Teatro Nacional de São Carlos, he got back to Italy and, after a sensational execution in Vienna of Romeo’s Prayer, out of which he was granted a crown on stage, Napoleon conferred upon him the Order of the Iron Crown of Lombardy and appointed him singing teacher of the Imperial Family. This new charge drove Crescentini to Paris from 1806 to 1812, when he finally got the leave to settle in his fatherland back again and was eventually free to retire from the stage. From 1814 he devoted himself to the teaching of singing at Bologna’s Liceo Musicale, whose direction he was entrusted in 1817, then also in Rome, and eventually at Naples’s Real Collegio di Musica, where he had, among his pupils, Isabella Colbran and Raffaele Mirate. In 1811 he had already published a didactic essay with the title “Esercizi per la vocalizzazione”. He died in Naples.

== Artistic features ==
With Pacchiariotti, Marchesi and with the extreme offshoot of Velluti, Crescentini led castrati’s last charge: he was called, for his singing’s prodigies, the “Italian Orpheus”, and for his great, theoretical too, competence in this art, the “Nestor of the musici". Decidedly unimposing on the stage (like Pacchiarotti), he was endowed with a clear, pliant and pure voice which won him the admiration of such personages as Alfred de Vigny, who, in his story “La vie e la mort du Capitaine Renaud ou La canne de jonc”, wrote of “a seraph’s voice which sprang from an emaciated and wrinkled face”, or as the seventeen-year-old Arthur Schopenhauer who, in his turn, entered in his diary a voice that was “beautiful in a supernatural way” and provided with a full and sweet timbre. Crescentini, who was not an exceedingly wide-ranged sopranista, always shunned the rush towards the highest notes which the C7 whistled by his contemporary La Bastardella was the living representation of, and shunned as well eagerness for immoderate singing ornamentation in all the cases where it was not actually necessary to the expression of those "infinitely minute nuances which form the secret of Crescentini's unique perfection in his interpretation of [an] aria; furthermore all this infinitely minute material is itself in a perpetual state of transformation, constantly responding to variations in the physical condition of the singer’s voice, or to changes in intensity of the exaltation and ecstasy by which he may happen to be inspired". Which would make any performance unfailingly different from the preceding one and from the following, too.

In a singing manner described as “cantar che nell’anima si sente” Crescentini headed the revenge of the belcanto of yore on the late 18th century’s singing fashion and contributed, together with Pacchiarotti, Grassini, Luísa Todi de Agujar, the tenor Giacomo David, and a few others, to laying the basis for the Rossini grand finale of two centuries’ history of operatic singing.

Something of his concept of singing, as he had expressed it in the mentioned “Esercizi per la vocalizzazione”, is likely to have passed as well in the vocal style of Bellini operas.

== Sources ==
- Barbier, Patrick. The World of the Castrati: The History of an Extraordinary Operatic Phenomenon. Trans. Margaret Crosland. Suffolk: Souvenir Press, 1996.
- Caruselli, Salvatore (ed), Grande enciclopedia della musica lirica, Longanesi &C. Periodici S.p.A., vol 4, Roma, I, ad nomen
- Celletti, Rodolfo, Storia del belcanto, Discanto Edizioni, Fiesole, 1983, passim
- Richard Somerset-Ward. Angels and Monsters. New Haven: Yale University Press, 2004.
- Sadie, Stanley (ed), The new Grove Dictionary of Opera, Oxford University Press, 1992, vol 4, ad nomen
- This article contains substantial material translated from Girolamo Crescentini in the Italian Wikipedia
