= Giovanni Domenico Zucchinetti =

Italian organist

Giovanni Domenico Zucchinetti (1735, Suna - c. 1801) was an Italian organist.

He was a brother to the composer Giovanni Bernardo Zucchinetti, whom he succeeded in 1765 as organist at the cathedrals of Varese and Monza.

His students included the composer Stefano Pavesi, and the famous contralto Giuseppina Grassini; he recommended that Grassini go to Milan for further study as an opera singer.
