= Fedele Fenaroli =

Italian composer and teacher (1730–1818)

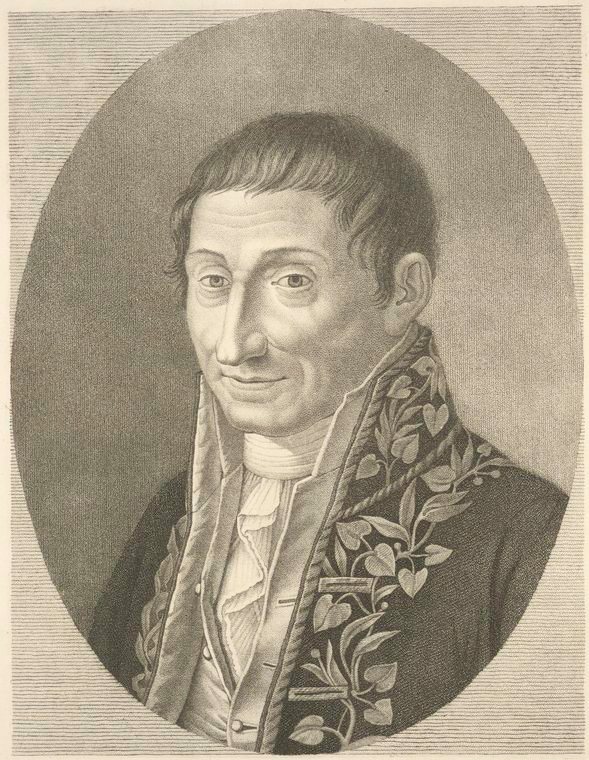
Fedele Fenaroli

Fedele Fenaroli (25 April 1730, Lanciano – 1 January 1818, Naples) was an Italian composer and music educator. Fenaroli entered the Conservatorio di Santa Maria di Loreto, one of the music conservatories of Naples, becoming a pupil of Francesco Durante. In 1762 he was appointed maestro di cappella. Among his students were many celebrated Italian composers, such as Domenico Cimarosa, Niccolò Antonio Zingarelli, and Saverio Mercadante. Giuseppe Verdi was a second-generation student, as his teacher, Vincenzo Lavigna, was a student of Fenaroli. Fenaroli wrote several treatises on music, which were widely used during the nineteenth century. As a composer, he wrote mainly sacred music.

== See also ==
- List of music students by teacher: C to F
