= Vittorio Trento =

Italian composer

Vittorio Trento (ca. 1761 – 1833) was an Italian composer born in Venice. He studied composition under Ferdinando Bertoni at the Conservatorio dei Mendicanti in Venice. He was primarily known for his ballets of which he composed more than 50 for Venetian theatres. In his later years he also composed a number of operas, including Teresa vedova (Venice, 1802), Ines de Castro (Livorno 1803), and Giulio Sabino nel suo castello di Langres (Bologna, 1824). Trento died in Lisbon.
