= La morte di Cesare =

Opera by Francesco Bianchi

- Opera seria by Francesco Bianchi
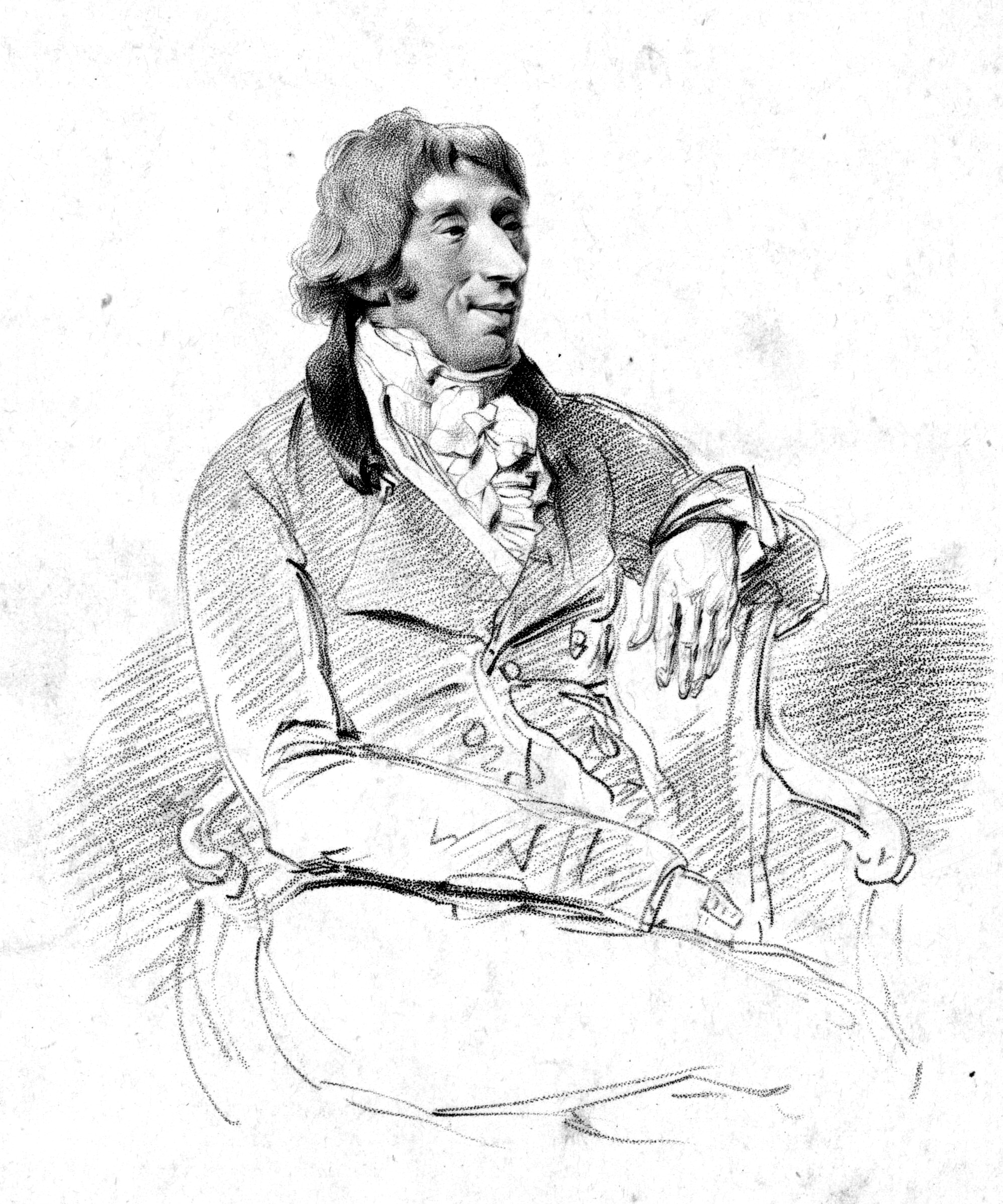
- The composer in 1805
- Librettist: Gaetano Sertor
- Language: Italian
- Based on: Shakespeare's Julius Caesar
- Premiere: 27 December 1788; Teatro San Samuele, Venice

La morte di Cesare ('The Death of Caesar') is an opera seria in three acts by Francesco Bianchi. The libretto was by Gaetano Sertor, after Shakespeare's play Julius Caesar.

La morte di Cesare was one of six texts that Sertor wrote for Bianchi, influencing a popular series of Venetian 'morte' operas in the 1790s. While the murder itself was not shown on the stage, the audience were left with the body of Caesar conspicuously in view during the closing scenes.

As with other Bianchi operas, there were innovations: the chorus participated actively in the drama, there was a ballet and a pantomime, a duet for two men, and a final oath scene (giuramento), besides the basically unconventional tragic ending.

== Performance history ==
The opera was first performed at the Teatro San Samuele in Venice on 27 December 1788.

== Roles ==
Role	Voice type	Premiere Cast, 27 December 1788 (Conductor: )
Giulio Cesare (Julius Caesar)	soprano castrato	Gaspare Pacchierotti
Calfurnia (Calpurnia)	soprano	Anna Casentini
Antonio (Mark Antony)	bass	Niccolò Perotti
Cassio (Cassius)	tenor	Filippo Martinelli
Bruto (Brutus)	tenor	Matteo Babini
Porzia (Porcia)	soprano	Antonia Viscardini
Albino	soprano castrato	Michele Cavanna

== Synopsis ==
The subject of the opera is the conspiracy, led by Cassio, Bruto and Porzia, to murder Giulio Cesare (Julius Caesar) in Rome in 44 BC. Giulio Cesare's loving relationship with Calfurnia forms a subplot.
