= Gli Orazi e i Curiazi =

- Azione tragica by Domenico Cimarosa
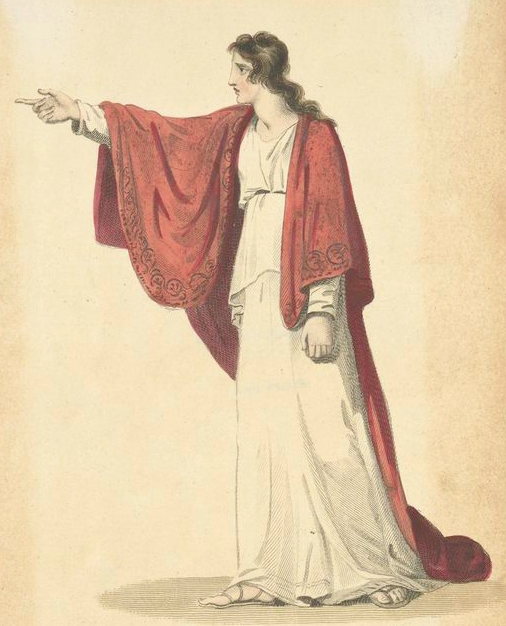
- Giuseppina Grassini as Orazia
- Translation: The Horatii and the Curiatii
- Librettist: Antonio Simeone Sografi
- Language: Italian
- Based on: Horace by Pierre Corneille
- Premiere: 26 December 1796; Teatro La Fenice, Venice

Gli Orazi e i Curiazi (The Horatii and the Curiatii) is an opera in three acts (azione tragica) composed by Domenico Cimarosa to a libretto by Antonio Simeone Sografi, based on Pierre Corneille's tragedy Horace.

== History ==
The opera was first staged on 26 December 1796 at the Teatro La Fenice in Venice. The première was so unsuccessful that Cimarosa, disappointed, decided to leave the town immediately. The run of the following performances, however, turned into a big success, as would happen twenty years later with Rossini’s The Barber of Seville. At least 49 performances were held throughout the season and the opera was later staged in the major European theatres, including Teatro La Scala in Milan and Napoleon’s imperial court in Paris. In Europe during the 18th century Italian operas did not normally endure very long in theatres, hardly ever getting through one season. Gli Orazi e i Curiazi, however, kept running for several decades, even after the death of Cimarosa. In Venice, for example, the opera had four further runs during the six years following the première and "more than 130 performances" altogether were staged in the same period.

The opera had several re-adaptations, among which Marcos António Portugal’s staged in 1798 is specially notable, and was also employed as the object of the parody La prima prova dell'opera "Gli Orazi e i Curiazi" by Francesco Gnecco on Giulio Artusi’s libretto – later to be renamed La prova di un'opera seria – which was also staged in Venice in 1803.

Gli Orazi e i Curiazi was very dear to Napoleon, especially in the Parisian performances of the singer Giuseppina Grassini who was for some time a lover of the Emperor, and of the castrato Girolamo Crescentini — both of whom had been the original creators of the major roles of Horatia and Curiatius in 1796. Grassini would almost always interpolate arias different from the original ones, mostly drawn from Portugal’s version.

The opera has been a matter of renewed interest in modern times with several stagings beginning from the Genoese Teatro dell’Opera Giocosa’s in 1983, which was also the first world recording, with Curiatius played by the soprano Daniela Dessì. Another notable revival took place at the Teatro dell'Opera di Roma in 1989 with the conductor Alan Curtis, Gianna Rolandi as Curiatius and Anna Caterina Antonacci as Horatia.

== Artistic features ==
Gli Orazi e i Curiazi is generally regarded as the best of the eleven opere serie produced by Cimarosa, even though the composer himself considered 1797's Artemisia, regina di Caria "the most passable" of his works. It represents the typical example, not so much of the second half of the 18th century’s dramma per musica in general, as that of the special kind of melodrama which was forced into fashion in the century’s last decade, following in the wake of revolutionary France’s military successes. The new fashion required melodrama to share in the new times by adequately exalting the republican virtues of ancient Rome. Rodolfo Celletti writes: "Cimarosa had already happened to occupy himself with Gaius Marius and Junius Brutus, but it was unintentionally. Now with Orazi e Curiazi, and the following year with Attilio Regolo, he was to give a more specific contribution to the exaltation of the republican myths". In the end, however, the composer still remained quite the same and according to Celletti it brought about the conclusion "that the opera hadn’t anything intimately tragic or really heroic. ... We have to consider everything according to the use it was conceived for. In Oriazi e Curiazi, an archetype of the classicist and 'republican' drama between the end of the 18th and the beginning of the 19th century, we must see a kind of elegant evolutive operation in ultra-conservatism ... As to musical habit, the republican melodrama by Cimarosa and others was adorned with some more embellishment and accepted clangs of trumpets and some marches in order to remain, substantially, the one it had always been at the time of court theatres: a source of lyric effusions and not of epic [bursts]." The musicologist Francesco Florimo, Bellini’s friend, chanced to observe: "sometimes Cimarosa gives himself up to a more lyric than tragic affection, at other times to vocalisms and graces which can only be borne in the comic genre".

According to Celletti it is rather hard to claim Gli Orazi e i Curiazi as a masterpiece, as it is for such a large part of the second half of the 18th century’s Italian opera seria. "Domenico Cimarosa was the standard-bearer of our comic musical theatre and … it is clear that the comic operist not only prevails over the serious one but it rather often gets out of his control and inspires him". So it happens in the duet between Curiatius and Horatius that opens with "the solemnity of the typical duets of challenge (Quando nel campo armata …)", only to pass soon, almost imperceptibly, "to the tenderness and the abandon of A questi accenti adesso …". Celletti says it is true for all the most noted pages of the opera, first of all Curiatius's Quelle pupille tenere. The only possible exception is Oratius’s Se alla patria ognor donai, which constitutes instead "an example of heroic aria for a tenor of buskined melodrama", which was to remain in full vogue till Rossini beginnings, "central range, periodical ascending intervals to give vigour and fit to the melody, short melismas or descending scales to strengthen its aulic expression, and intensification of the melismas when the Allegro A voi tutti il vivo lampo begins."

Celletti also says that Cimarosa got to give the best of his inspiration in the grand scene of the subterranean temple in act two: "An orchestral introduction, solemn and mysterious, is followed by other orchestral moments of a descriptive character that show how brilliantly certain operists of ours could catch the element either mysterious or fearful or horrid without imitating nature slavishly…; but in the meantime the beautiful recitatives of Curiatius and of Horatia and Curiatius’Andantino Ei stesso intrepido intersect, to come to the great resumption of the other solo voices and of the chorus (Regni silenzio muto, profondo)."

The final furious duet between Marcus Horatius and Horatia is unusual in Metastasio melodrama, but was reported to be "greatly appreciated" by the public. In the première it was performed by two of the most imposing coeval singers: the young beautiful man-eater diva (and great cantatrice), Grassini, and the handsome heroic tenor Matteo Babini (or Babbini), who, besides being a cultured, most refined and expressive singer, could undoubtedly cut a worthy figure by her side, not surely lacking in phisique du rôle (he was tall, blond, slender and with a very fine countenance).

Cimarosa's vocal writing is extremely measured, avoiding high tessitura, long vocalizations, acrobatics and excessive ornamentation — save, to a small extent, in Marcus Horatius’ heroic aria. Celletti comments on this "Cimarosa’s coloratura is one of those we can define as wide, opposed to the minute coloraturas of some baroque operists or of the Neapolitan period’s Rossini. Hence the performers have not the discretion but the duty of integrating the composer’s writing with variations, reductions and interpolation of cadenzas, especially in the da capo".

== Synopsis ==
The action takes place in Rome during the war against the town of Alba Longa. The protagonists of the opera are two families, the Horatii from Rome and the Curiatii from Alba. In spite of the state of war the two families are connected as a girl from the Curiatii, Sabina, has married Marcus Horatius, the designate heir of the Roman family. During a truce in the war Horatius' daughter Horatia is in her turn given in marriage to her beloved Curiatius, leader of the Alban family. In order to avoid further major damage the two kings, Tullus Hostilius and Mettius Fufetius, reach an agreement to settle contention between the two towns through a limited encounter to the death between six champions, three from the Horatii and three from the Curiatii. The news of the agreement drives the two families to despair as the two sisters-in-law are doomed to weep over the death of either their husbands or their brothers.

In act two Horatia and Sabina, supported by the people and the priests, endeavour to prevent the abomination of a mortal challenge between relatives by swarming over the Campo Martio just as the struggle is about to start. They manage to wring a postponement in order to allow Apollo's oracle to be consulted. Both families warriors accept this decision reluctantly. Act two ends in a grand scene in the vaults of Apollo's temple: at first Curiatius and Horatia appear there alone, later they are joined by all the others and Curatius bewails the sad fate of those who are possibly going to shed their relatives' blood. Finally the oracle's voice proclaims that the challenge must go on.

Act three is shorter than the others and is generally staged along with act two. After a farewell scene between Curiatius and Horatia it shows the final encounter between Marcus Horatius, victorious in the fight, and his distressed sister. Horatia, rebelling against her fate, calls down curses from the gods upon her native town which has driven her husband to a bloody death and is in her turn slain by her furious ruthless brother and flung headlong down the staircase.

== Roles ==
| Rôle | First performer's vocal register | Premiere cast, 26 December 1796 (Scenery: Antonio Mauro ) |
|---|---|---|
| Publio Orazio | tenor | Giuseppe Desirò |
| Marco Orazio | tenor | Matteo Babini |
| Orazia | mezzo-soprano/contralto | Giuseppina Grassini |
| Curiazio | soprano castrato | Girolamo Crescentini |
| Sabina | soprano | Carolina Maranesi |
| Licinio | soprano castrato | Francesco Rossi |
| Il Gran sacerdote | basso | Filippo Fragni |
| L'augure | basso | Fantino Mori |
| l'oracolo | basso | Fantino Mori |
| Tullo Ostilio (usually not performed) | tenor | Odoardo Caprotti |
| Mezio Fufezio (usually not performed) | tenor | Antonio Mangino |
coro
