= Giulietta e Romeo (Zingarelli) =

Opera by Antonio Zingarelli

Giulietta e Romeo is a dramma per musica by composer Niccolò Antonio Zingarelli with an Italian libretto by Giuseppe Maria Foppa after the 1530 novella of the same name by Luigi Da Porto and Shakespeare's Romeo and Juliet. The opera premiered at the Teatro alla Scala in Milan on 30 January 1796.

Giulietta e Romeo was composed by Zingarelli in only eight days and it is considered by many scholars to be his best work. The opera remained a part of the Italian repertory well into the nineteenth century and the role of Romeo was a favourite vehicle for Maria Malibran until c. 1830.

== Roles ==
Roles, voice types, premiere cast
Role	Voice type	Premiere cast, 30 January 1796 Conductor: Luigi De Baillou
Everardo Capellio	tenor	Adamo Bianchi
Giulietta	mezzo-soprano/contralto	Giuseppina Grassini
Romeo Montecchio	soprano castrato	Girolamo Crescentini
Teobaldo	tenor	Gaetano De Paoli
Gilberto	soprano castrato	Angelo Monanni "Manzoletti"
Matilde	soprano	Carolina Dinand
Members of the Capellio and Montecchio families
