= Gaspare Pacchierotti =

Italian opera singer (1740–1821)

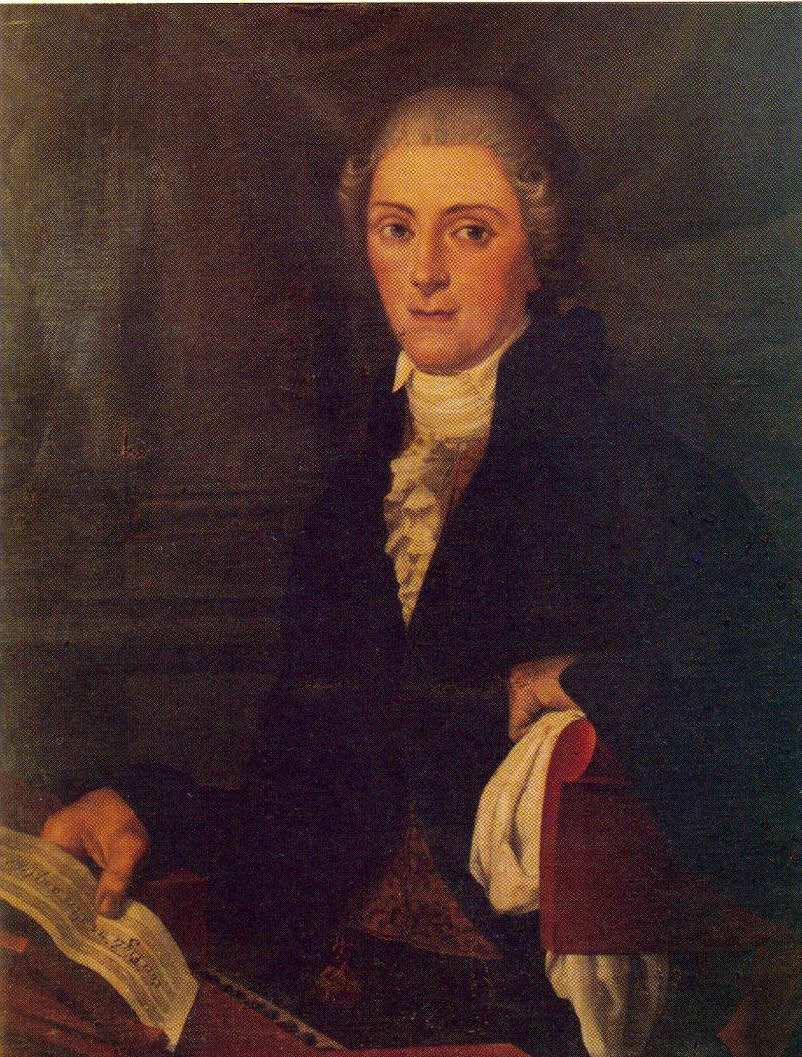
- Born: 21 May 1740; Fabriano, March of Ancona, Papal States
- Died: 28 October 1821 (aged 81); Padua, Lombardy–Venetia, Austrian Empire
- Resting place: Padua, Veneto, Italy
- Other names: Gasparo Pacchierotti; Gaspare Pacchiarotti; Gasparo Pacchiarotti; Porfirio Pacchierotti; Porfirio Pacchiarotti
- Occupation: Mezzo-soprano castrato singer
- Years active: 1759–1797

Gaspare Pacchierotti (Italian: [ˈɡaspare pakkjeˈrɔtti]; variants of his names include Gasparo and Pacchiarotti; 21 May 1740 – 28 October 1821) was a mezzo-soprano castrato, and one of the most famous singers of his time.

== Life ==
=== Training and first appearances ===
Details of his early life are scarce. It is possible that he studied with Mario Bittoni, maestro di cappella in the cathedral of his home city, Fabriano. Under the stage name of Porfirio Pacchierotti, he made his début in Baldassare Galuppi's opera Le nozze di Dorina at the Teatro dei Nobili in Perugia during the carnival season of 1759, playing, as young castrati often did, a female role: Livietta. He made further appearances under his assumed name in Venice (1764) and Innsbruck (1765). On this latter occasion he sang Acronte in Hasse's Romolo ed Ersilia on the occasion of the marriage of Peter Leopold of Habsburg-Lorraine, future Grand Duke of Tuscany and Holy Roman Emperor, and the Infanta Maria Luisa of Spain. Here, for the first time, he encountered the famous castrato Gaetano Guadagni, then at the height of his career.

=== Early career ===
By the late 1760s Pacchierotti was well established in Venice, both as an opera singer and member of the choir of St Mark's, where Galuppi was Director of Music. His first success as primo uomo (lead male singer) was in that composer's Il re pastore, in which he first sang the role of Agenore at the Teatro San Benedetto, Venice, in the summer of 1769. In that city he also received further vocal tuition from Ferdinando Bertoni, the composer and singing teacher, who became a lifelong friend.

In 1770, he was at Palermo, where he sang alongside the famous and notoriously capricious soprano, Caterina Gabrielli, whose every feat of virtuosity he not only equalled but so far surpassed that he earned that redoubtable lady's admiration. The following year saw him performing at the Teatro San Carlo in Naples, perhaps the most famous opera house in Italy at this time. Here he remained for some five years, performing in twenty operas. His prima donna was often Anna de Amicis, and soon their respective adoring fans caused the sparks to fly. One supporter of the soprano, an officer in the Royal Guard called Francesco Ruffo, saw fit to insult Pacchierotti publicly, and a duel was fought as a result. Because of Ruffo's royal connection (and also because, as a nobleman, he was immune from prosecution), the poor singer spent several days in prison, but apparently the noble youth himself obtained his release. There is another version of this story in which Ruffo was the lover (cavalier servente) of a certain Marchesa Santa Marca, who had become infatuated with Pacchierotti on hearing him sing in Schuster's Didone abbandonata. His honour insulted, Ruffo again challenged the singer to a duel, and this time it was none other than the King of Naples who ordered Gaspare to be released from prison.

=== Career in northern Italy ===
After such adventures, it is hardly surprising that Pacchierotti left Naples in 1776, never to sing there again. For the next fifteen years he worked in northern Italy, especially Milan, Venice, Genoa, Padua and Turin. In Milan, he famously appeared at the inauguration of the Teatro alla Scala on 3 August 1778, taking the protagonist's role of Asterio in Europa riconosciuta by Antonio Salieri. While appearing at Venice in 1785, he sang at the funeral of his old patron Galuppi, remarking that "I sang very devoutly indeed to obtain a quiet for his soul".

=== Visits to London ===
Pacchierotti also visited London on several occasions between 1778 and 1791. There he was universally adored, perhaps even more by real opera cognoscenti than by the public in general. One of the former, Lord Mount Edgcumbe, left a detailed description of the singer's many merits:

Pacchierotti's voice was an extensive soprano, full and sweet in the highest degree: his powers of execution were great, but he had far too good taste and good sense to make a display of them where it would have been misapplied, ... conscious that the chief delight of singing and his own supreme excellence lay in touching expression and exquisite pathos. Yet he was so thorough a musician that nothing came amiss to him; every style was to him equally easy, and he could sing, at first sight, all songs of the most opposite characters, not merely with the facility and correctness which a complete knowledge of music must give, but entering at once into the views of the composer, and giving them all the spirit and expression he had designed. Such was his genius in his embellishments and cadences, that their variety was inexhaustible. ... As an actor, with many disadvantages of person ... he was nevertheless forcible and impressive ... His recitative was inimitably fine, so that even those who did not understand the language could not fail to comprehend, from his countenance, voice and action, every sentiment he expressed. As a concert singer, and particularly in private society, he shone almost more than on the stage ... he was a worthy and good man, modest and diffident to a fault ... He was unpresuming in his manners, grateful and attached to all his numerous friends and patrons.

During his visits to London, Pacchierotti mainly performed in operas by his friend Bertoni, now well known as a composer in the genre. In spite of the "many disadvantages of person" remarked on by Mount Edgcumbe, the singer continued to have ladies fall in love with him, notably Susanna Burney, daughter of the music historian Charles Burney, who described his singing as "divine". Known as "sweet Pacc" to Susanna and her sister Fanny (herself a well-known author and later Madame d'Arblay), he also earned their respect during the anti-Catholic Gordon Riots of June 1780 by refusing to remove his name from his door and, though an Italian Catholic, insisting on walking the streets openly while the mob yelled "No Popery!" As to further emotional entanglements, the notorious William Beckford wrote of one noblewoman, Lady Mary Duncan, that she was "more preciously fond" of the singer "than a she-bear of its suckling". Pacchierotti had met Beckford in 1780 at Lucca, during the young aristocrat's grand tour, and the following year he became involved in a performance marking that dissolute young nobleman's twenty-first birthday. This was of a cantata entitled Il tributo, by a fellow castrato, Venanzio Rauzzini, long settled in England, and took place at Beckford's mansion Fonthill Splendens, near Bath. The third soloist was another castrato, Giusto Fernando Tenducci, (Note: Tenducci was called "Senesino", like his more famous predecessor, Francesco Bernardi) a friend of Gainsborough. On 27 May 1784 Pacchierotti sang various arias by Handel at the centenary celebrations of the composer's birth held in the London Pantheon. His last visit to London in 1791 has become famous to posterity for his numerous performances of Haydn's cantata Arianna a Naxos to the composer's own piano accompaniment.

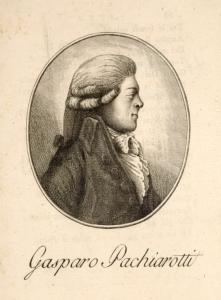
Pacchierotti

=== Return to Italy ===
His first appearance on his final return to Italy was for the inauguration of another opera house: the new Teatro la Fenice in Venice, where on 16 May 1792 he sang the leading role of Alceo in I giuochi d'Agrigento by Paisiello alongside Brigida Banti. The following season he made his last operatic appearance in the same theatre, in the premiere production of Giuseppe Giordani's Ines de Castro, which opened on 27 January 1793, during the Carnival season.

Pacchierotti retired to Padua, but on 2 May 1797, in the Teatro Nuovo of that city, was obliged to perform again at a concert for the all-conquering Napoleon. Never reconciled to the destruction of his beloved Venetian Republic by the French, Pacchierotti's patriotism got him into trouble. In a letter to his colleague Angelica Catalani he referred to "the splendid miseries of victory." This was unfortunately intercepted by the French police, and the singer was once more imprisoned.

=== Retirement and old age ===
Famous even in retirement, Pacchierotti was visited by many well-known figures, including Rossini. On the singer's complaining that the latter's music was too noisy, the composer retorted: "Give me another Pacchierotti and I will know how to write for him!" Another visitor was Stendhal, who remarked that: "I learned more about music in six conversations with this great artist, than from any book; it was the soul speaking to the soul." Though now out of the limelight, Pacchierotti continued to practise, being particularly devoted to the Psalm settings of Benedetto Marcello, from which he averred "to have learned the little that he knew". On 28 June 1814, he underwent the emotional experience of singing in Saint Mark's Basilica in Venice at the funeral service held in honour of his old friend and favourite composer, Ferdinando Bertoni. He last sang in public on 19 October 1817, at the age of seventy-seven, performing a motet in the church of Mirano, a few miles west of Venice. Famous for this remark that "he who knows how to breathe, knows how to sing", he also taught singing, and it is likely that a treatise by Antonio Calegari, entitled Modi generali del canto and published in Milan in 1836, is at least partly based on Pacchierotti's own methods.

In and around Padua, the singer bought several properties, the best known being the Ca' Farsetti, said to have been once owned by Pietro Bembo. He also built an extraordinary neo-Gothic mansion, the Castello Pacchierotti, the ruins of which were much later (1881) described by the English writer Violet Page (alias Vernon Lee): " ... in this remote corner of Padua we stumbled one day into a beautiful tangle of trees and grass and flowers ... and were informed by a gardener's boy that this garden had once belonged to a famous singer, by name Gasparo Pacchierotti ... The gardener led us into the house, a battered house, covered with creepers and amphorae, and sentimental inscriptions from the works of the poets and philosophers in vogue a hundred years ago ... He showed us into a long narrow room, in which was a large slender harpsichord ... which had belonged to ... the singer. It was open, and looked as if it might just have been touched, but no sound could be drawn from it. The gardener then led us into a darkened lumber-room, where hung the portrait of the singer, thickly covered with dust: a mass of dark blurs, from out of which appeared scarcely more than the pale thin face – a face with deep dreamy eyes and tremulously tender lips, full of a vague, wistful, contemplative poetry..."

Stricken by dropsy, Pacchierotti died at the age of eighty-one. His grave was recently discovered in an ancient oratory adjoining Villa Pacchierotti-Zemella in Padua.

In his still seminal work, The Castrati in Opera, Angus Heriot wrote: "Today we can but guess what the great singers of the past can have sounded like; but one might hazard a guess that of all the castrati, could we hear them, Pacchierotti would please us most …"

== Roles created ==
The following list is not complete (it misses out, for instance, Pacchiarotti's performances in Palermo, the première of Bertoni's Artaserse, etc.), but is indicative of the wide extent of the singer's career.

Role	Opera	Genre	Composer	Theatre	Première's date
Acronte (Note: role performed under the name of Porfirio Pacchierotti)	Romolo ed Ersilia	dramma per musica	Johann Adolph Hasse	Innsbruck, Opernhoftheater	6 August 1765
Ulisse (Note: Casaglia 2005 does not quote the performers' names in this opera.)	Achille in Sciro	dramma per musica	Florian Leopold Gassmann	Venezia, Teatro (Grimani) San Giovanni Grisostomo	8 May 1766
Agenore	Il re pastore	dramma per musica	Baldassare Galuppi	Venezia, Teatro (Gallo) San Benedetto	Summer 1767
Jove	Jupiter et Calisto	2nd entrée of the opéra-ballet Les projets de l'Amour	Jean-Joseph Cassanéa de Mondonville	Naples, Real Teatro San Carlo	29 May 1771
Oreste	Ifigenia in Tauride	dramma per musica	Niccolò Jommelli	Naples, Real Teatro San Carlo	30 May 1771
Sammete	Nitteti	dramma per musica	Pasquale Anfossi	Naples, Real Teatro San Carlo	13 August 1771
Ezio	Ezio	dramma per musica	Antonio Sacchini	Naples, Real Teatro San Carlo	4 November 1771
	Per festeggiare il felicissimo giorno natalizio di sua maestà cattolica (Note: King Ferdinando IV of Naples)	cantata	Vincenzo Curcio	Naples, Real Teatro San Carlo	12 January 1772
Tarquinio	Il trionfo di Clelia	dramma per musica	Giovanni Battista Borghi	Naples, Real Teatro San Carlo	20 May 1773
Romolo	Romolo ed Ersilia	dramma per musica	Josef Mysliveček	Naples, Real Teatro San Carlo	13 August 1773
Adriano	Adriano in Siria	dramma per musica	Giacomo Insanguine	Naples, Real Teatro San Carlo	4 November 1773
Orfeo	Orfeo ed Euridice	azione teatrale per musica	Antonio Tozzi	Munich, Hoftheater an der Residenz	9 January 1775
Ezio	Ezio	opera seria	Josef Mysliveček	Naples, Real Teatro San Carlo	5 June 1775
Sammete	La Nitteti	dramma per musica	Domenico Fischietti (Fischetti)	Naples, Real Teatro San Carlo	4 November 1775
Orfeo (Note: in performing this role, Pacchierotti apparently alternated with or substituted for his colleague Gaetano Guadagni, who had already created the same role in Gluck's opera of the same name, set to the same libretto.)	Orfeo ed Euridice	dramma per musica	Ferdinando Bertoni	Venice, Teatro (Gallo) San Benedetto	3 January 1776
Tolomeo	Tolomeo re d'Egitto	cantata	Joseph Schuster	Naples, Real Teatro San Carlo	12 January 1776
Enea	Didone abbandonata	dramma per musica	Joseph Schuster	Naples, Real Teatro San Carlo	12 March 1776
Timante	Demofoonte	dramma per musica	Joseph Schuster	Forlì, Teatro nuovo	30 May 1776
Arsace	Medonte	opera seria	Ferdinando Bertoni	Turin, Nuovo Teatro Regio	27 December 1777
Quinto Fabio	Quinto Fabio	dramma per musica	Ferdinando Bertoni	Milan, Teatro Interinale (viz the temporary substitute for Milan's former main theatre which had been destroyed by fire)	31 January 1778
Asterio	Europa riconosciuta	dramma serio per musica	Antonio Salieri	Milan, Teatro alla Scala (inauguration)	3 August 1778
Rinaldo	Armida abbandonata	dramma per musica	Ferdinando Bertoni	Venice, Teatro (Gallo) San Benedetto	26 December 1780
Sabino	Giulio Sabino	dramma per musica	Giuseppe Sarti	Venice, Teatro (Gallo) San Benedetto	3 January 1781
	Il tributo	cantata	Venanzio Rauzzini	William Beckford's residence at Fonthill Gifford, (Wiltshire)	29 September 1781
Gualtieri	Il disertore francese	dramma per musica	Francesco Bianchi	Venice, Teatro (Gallo) San Benedetto	26 December 1784
Poro	Alessandro nell'Indie	dramma per musica	Francesco Bianchi	Venice, Teatro (Gallo) San Benedetto	28 January 1785
Timante	Demofoonte	dramma per musica	Alessio Prati	Venice, Teatro (Gallo) San Benedetto	26 December 1786
Zamti	L'orfano cinese	dramma per musica	Francesco Bianchi	Venice, Teatro (Gallo) San Benedetto	30 January 1787
Giulio Cesare	La morte di Cesare	dramma per musica	Francesco Bianchi	Venice, Teatro (Gallo) San Benedetto	27 December 1788
Sammete	Nitteti	dramma per musica	Ferdinando Bertoni	Venice, Teatro San Samuele	1789
Alcéo-Clearco	I giuochi di Agrigento	dramma per musica	Giovanni Paisiello	Venice, Teatro alla Fenice (inauguration)	16 May 1792
Tarara	Tarara o sia La virtù premiata	dramma per musica	Francesco Bianchi	Venice, Teatro alla Fenice	26 December 1792
Don Pedro	Ines de Castro	dramma per musica	Giuseppe Giordani "Giordaniello"	Venice, Teatro alla Fenice	28 January 1793
