= Giuseppe Giordani =

Italian composer (1751–1798)

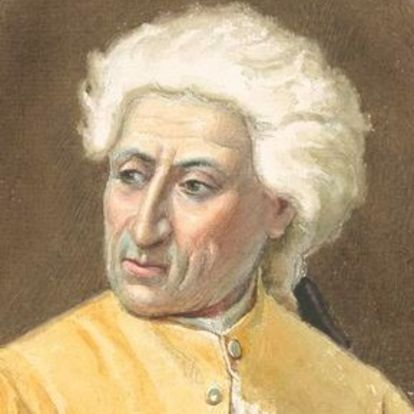
Alleged portrait of Giordani

Giuseppe Tommaso Giovanni Giordani (December 19, 1751, Naples – January 4, 1798, Fermo) was an Italian composer, mainly of opera.

Giordani's parents were Domenico Giordani and Anna Maria Tosato. He studied music in Naples with Domenico Cimarosa and Niccolò Antonio Zingarelli. In 1774, he was appointed as music director of the chapel of the Duomo of Naples. His first opera (L'Epponina) was released in 1779. His sacred drama La distruzione di Gerusalemme was a notable success at the Teatro San Carlo of Naples in 1787. He became maestro di cappella at the Cathedral of Fermo in 1791.

Until recently, the popular aria Caro Mio Ben (1783) was ascribed to Giuseppe Tommaso Giovanni Giordani. However, scholars now consider Tommaso Giordani, or his father Giuseppe Giordani senior, more likely to be the aria's composer.
