= Angelo Tarchi (composer) =

Italian composer (c. 1760–1814)

Angelo Tarchi (c. 1760 – 19 August 1814) was an Italian composer of numerous operas as well as sacred music. Between 1778 and 1787, he worked primarily in Italy, producing five or six new operas each year.

Tarchi was born in Naples. In December 1787 he was appointed music director and composer at London's King's Theatre, a position he held until June 1789. Tarchi returned to Italy in 1791 and remained there until 1798 when he went to Paris. He composed several works in the opéra comique genre which achieved only moderate success. When he gave up composing, he became fashionable singing teacher in Paris, where he died in 1814.

== Operas ==
- L'archetiello (1778)
- I viluppi amorosi (1778)
- Il barbiere di Arpino (1779)
- Il rè alla caccia (1780)
- Le disgrazie fortunate (1781)
- Don Fallopio (1782)
- Il guerriero immaginario (1783)
- Ademira (1783)
- I fratelli Pappamosca (1784)
- Bacco ed Arianna (1784)
- Le cose d'oggi giorno divise in trenta tomi, tomo primo, parte prima (1784)
- Il matrimonio per contrattempo (1785)
- Mitridate rè di Ponto (1785)
- L'Arminio (1785)
- Ifigenia in Aulide (1785)
- La Virginia (1785)
- Ifigenia in Tauride (1785)
- Ariarate (1786)
- Publio (1786)
- Demofoonte (1786)
- Il trionfo di Clelia (1786)
- Demetrio (1787)
- Melite riconosciuta (1787)
- Il conte di Saldagna (1787)
- Le nozze di Figaro (1787)
- Antioco (1787)
- Le due rivali (1787/1788)
- Alessandro nelle Indie (1788)
- Artaserse (1788)
- Ezio (1789)
- Il disertore francese (1789)
- La generosità di Alessandro (1789)
- La finta baronessa (1790)
- Giulio Sabino (1790)
- Il cavaliere errante (1790)
- Lo spazzacamino principe (1790)
- L'apoteosi d'Ercole (1790)
- Don Chisciotte (1791 )
- Tito Manlio (1791)
- La morte di Nerone (1792)
- L'Olimpiade (1792)
- Adrasto rè d'Egitto (1792)
- Ezio (1792)
- Dorval e Virginia (1793)
- Lo stravagante (1793)
- Le Danaide (1794)
- L'impostura poco dura (1795)
- Ciro riconosciuto (1796)
- La congiura pisoniana (1797)
- Ester (1797)
- Alessandro nelle Indie (1798)
- Le Cabriolet jaune, ou Le Phénix d'Angoulême (1798)
- Aurore de Gusman (1799)
- Le Général suédois (1799)
- Le Trente et quarante (1799)
- D'Auberge en auberge, ou Les Préventions (1800)
- Une Aventure de M. de Sainte-Foix, ou Le coup d'épée (1802)
- Astolphe et Alba, ou A Quoi la fortune (1802)
- Il Pimmaglione (?)

== Sources ==
- Dennis Libby, Marita P. McClymonds. The New Grove Dictionary of Opera, edited by Stanley Sadie (1992). ISBN 0-333-73432-7 and ISBN 1-56159-228-5
