= Luísa Todi =

Portuguese opera singer (1753–1833)

Luísa Rosa de Aguiar Todi
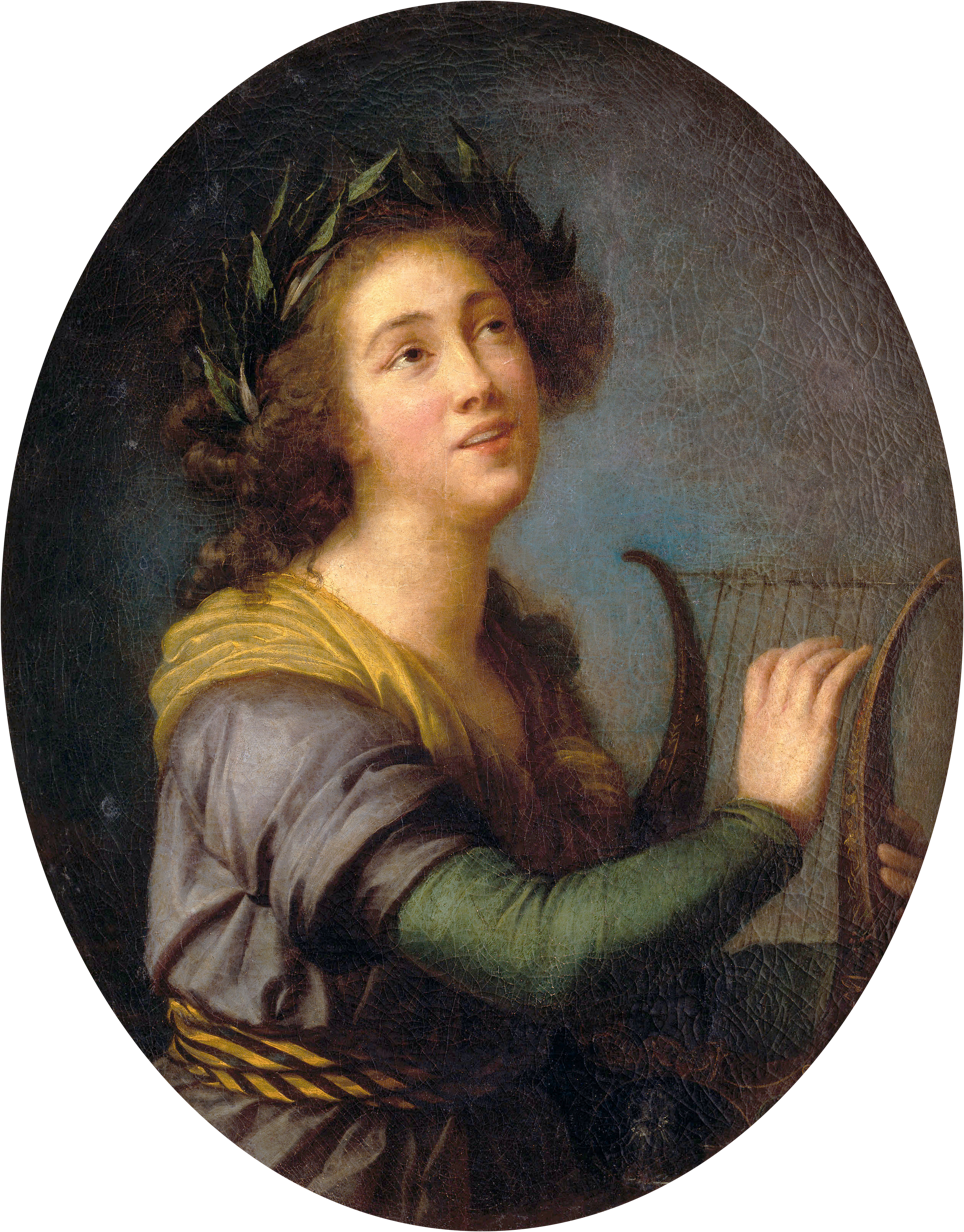
- Portrait of Luísa Todi, painted by Vigée Le Brun, 1785
- Born: 9 January 1753; Setúbal, Kingdom of Portugal
- Died: 1 October 1833 (aged 80); Lisbon, Kingdom of Portugal
- Occupation: Mezzo-soprano opera singer

Luísa Rosa de Aguiar Todi (9 January 1753–1 October 1833) was a popular and successful Portuguese mezzo-soprano opera singer.

== Early life ==
Luísa Todi was born Luísa Rosa de Aguiar on 9 January 1753 in Setúbal, Portugal. In 1765, her family moved to Lisbon, where her father was a musical writer in the Theatre of Bairro Alto.

Luísa began her career as an actress in 1767 or 1768 in Molière's play Tartuffe at the Teatro da Rua dos Condes (at that time the only theatre in Portugal). She met Francesco Saverio Todi, an Italian violinist, whom she married in 1769. After their marriage, on her husband's advice, she began having singing lessons with Davide Perez, an Italian composer and Music Master of the Portuguese Royal Chapel.

In 1770, she began her career as a singer with Giuseppe Scolari's opera Il Viaggiatore Ridicolo, in the Theatre of Bairro Alto. From 1772 to 1777, Luísa lived in Porto, where she was a singer and a singing teacher and where she began to be recognized as an artist of stature.

== Rise to fame ==
In the winter of 1777, at age 24, she gave her first performance abroad, at the King's Theatre in London. The enthusiastic critics said that "Mrs. Luísa Todi possesses high merit as singer and as actress."

In 1778 she sang at the famous Concerts Spirituels in Paris, winning a triumph and being considered the best foreign singer ever featured in France. She remained in France until 1780; then from 1780 to 1783, she sang at the Teatro Regio in Turin and gave performances in Germany and Austria in 1781.

She returned to Paris for further Concerts Spirituels series, during which time a confrontation arose between Luísa Todi and the German soprano Gertrud Elisabeth Mara (1749–1833), which divided the public. Luísa Todi won this battle of rivals, being called by the French "the Nation's Singer".

== Life in Russia ==
In 1784, Luísa travelled to Russia with her husband and children. They arrived at St. Petersburg on 7 June 1784 (27 May O.S.). On 10 June (30 May O.S.), Luísa gave her first concert, performing Giuseppe Sarti's Armida and Rinaldo. She was so impressive that at the end of that concert the Empress Catherine II presented her with two diamond bracelets. To express their gratitude, Luísa and her husband wrote the opera Pollinia and dedicated it to the Empress.

The opera's première was in October, when Luísa performed with the famous castrato Luigi Marchesi (1754–1829). Marchesi, famous for his turbulent temperament, envied her success. He and the composer Sarti engaged in a campaign of rivalry against Luísa Todi. Empress Catherine took Luísa's side and declined to renew the contract of Marchesi and Sarti.

Luísa Todi stayed for four years in Russia (1784–1788). She was the royal princesses' singing teacher, and Catherine II often presented her with jewels.

In 1788 Luísa was at Frederick William II of Prussia's court. The following year she returned to Paris for her third season of Concerts Spirituels and was considered by critics as "the greatest singer of her time." She returned to the Prussian court a few weeks before the beginning of the French Revolution.

== Height of her career ==
In 1790 she started a triumphant tour through Germany, and in Bonn she performed for Beethoven. At the end of that year, she travelled to Venice and performed at the Teatro San Samuele in the opera La Didone Abbandonata, wearing a tiara, necklace, and diamond earrings that had been given to her by the Russian Empress.

In Venice, Luísa Todi attained one of the most glittering moments of her career; the Italian season of 1790/1791 became known as "Todi's Year". But during her stay in Venice, she started experiencing vision problems, which caused her to abandon the stage for some months. The Venetians expressed their concern and fans wrote hundreds of verses and poems in her honour. When Luísa returned to the stage in 1791, she was greeted with a rapturous ovation. She also toured other Italian cities.

Between 1792 and 1796, she sang in Madrid at the Teatro de los Caños del Peral.

In April 1793, Luísa returned to Portugal. She required a special authorization to perform there, because at that time women were forbidden to appear on the public stage. In Lisbon she sang at a commemorative party for the Prince Regent's (the future John VI) daughter's birth. Sadly, her native country failed to recognize Luísa's outstanding talent, because her performance was not widely advertised and the Royal Family was absent from the event.

After singing in Naples, she returned to Portugal in 1801, living in Porto. There she continued to sing until the death of her husband in 1803, when she retired and wore mourning clothes for the rest of her life.

In 1809, Porto was invaded by the Napoleonic army commanded by General Soult. Luísa Todi decided to abandon the city, but during the escape she lost most of her belongings, including her priceless jewels. This caused financial problems during the last years of her life. Luísa Todi and her family were imprisoned by the French, but General Soult recognized her as "the Nation's Singer" and protected her.

== Death ==
In 1811 she moved to Lisbon. By 1823, following her earlier vision problems, she had become completely blind. She died on 1 October 1833 after suffering a stroke the previous July. She was buried in the cemetery of the Church of the Incarnation, close to Chiado, in Lisbon. The cemetery area still exists today, underneath the foundations of a later building at 78 Rua do Alecrim. In spite of constant requests made by Todi enthusiasts and family descendants, one of the greatest Portuguese singers of all time remains buried beneath the pavement of an obscure cellar.

== Legacy ==
Before her death, Luísa Todi saw her talent immortalised in Antoine Reicha's book Traité de melodie, where she is described as "the Singer of all Centuries". In modern Lisbon, the street in which Luísa Todi died was named Rua Luísa Todi in 1917. This is at the northern edge of Bairro Alto, just off Rua de São Pedro de Alcântara above the church of São Roque. She was also immortalised in her native city of Setúbal with a large monument and bust as well as the naming of Setúbal's biggest main avenue as Avenida Luísa Todi.

Todi was praised for her vocal abilities, her clear diction, her linguistic skills (she spoke French, English, Italian, and German), her professionalism, her talent as an actress, and the emotion and sensibility with which she infused her roles.
