= Ferdinando Bertoni =

Italian composer and organist (1725–1813)

Ferdinando Gasparo Bertoni
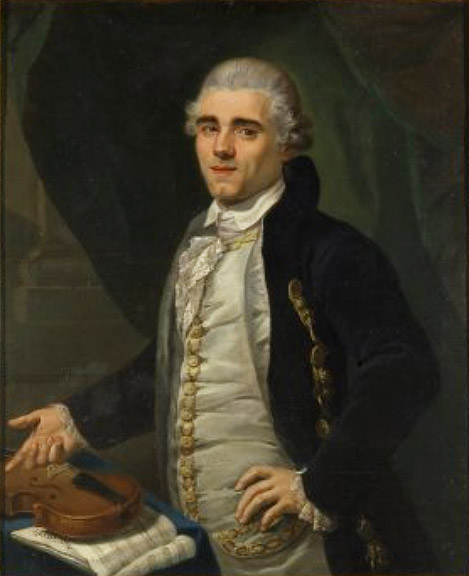
- Born: 15 August 1725; Salò
- Died: 1 December 1813 (aged 88); Desenzano del Garda
- Occupations: Composer and organist.
- Notable work: Composed 70 operas; Composed 200 sacred works

Ferdinando Gasparo Bertoni (15 August 1725 – 1 December 1813) was an Italian composer and organist.

== Early years ==
He was born in Salò, Republic of Venice, and began his music studies in Brescia, not far from his birthplace. Around 1740 he went to Bologna, where he studied until 1745 with the famous music theorist Giovanni Battista Martini.

== Career ==
Then he moved to Venice, where in 1752 he was appointed as first organist at San Marco. From 1755 to 1777 he was choirmaster at the Ospedale dei Mendicanti, also in Venice. In the period 1778–1783 he was in London, where he composed operas for the King's Theatre. Back to Venice in 1784, he succeeded Baldassare Galuppi in 1785 as Kapellmeister of San Marco and preserved this position until his retirement in 1808.

== Works ==
A prolific writer of church music, Bertoni also composed 70 operas which fell into oblivion, except Orfeo (Venice, Teatro San Benedetto, 1776), based on the same libretto by Ranieri de' Calzabigi for the work of Christoph Willibald Gluck, Orfeo ed Euridice (Burgtheater, Vienna, 1762). Bertoni composed this work especially for his friend Gaetano Guadagni, a castrato, who would interpret the role of Orfeo (the same role he had interpreted in Gluck’s Orfeo ed Euridice). Bertoni generally ignored Gluck's reforms and composed the work in the old style of opera seria. Bertoni composed at least 200 sacred works (including about 50 oratorios) and cantatas, instrumental work and chamber music.

== Death ==
He died in Desenzano del Garda.

== Performances ==
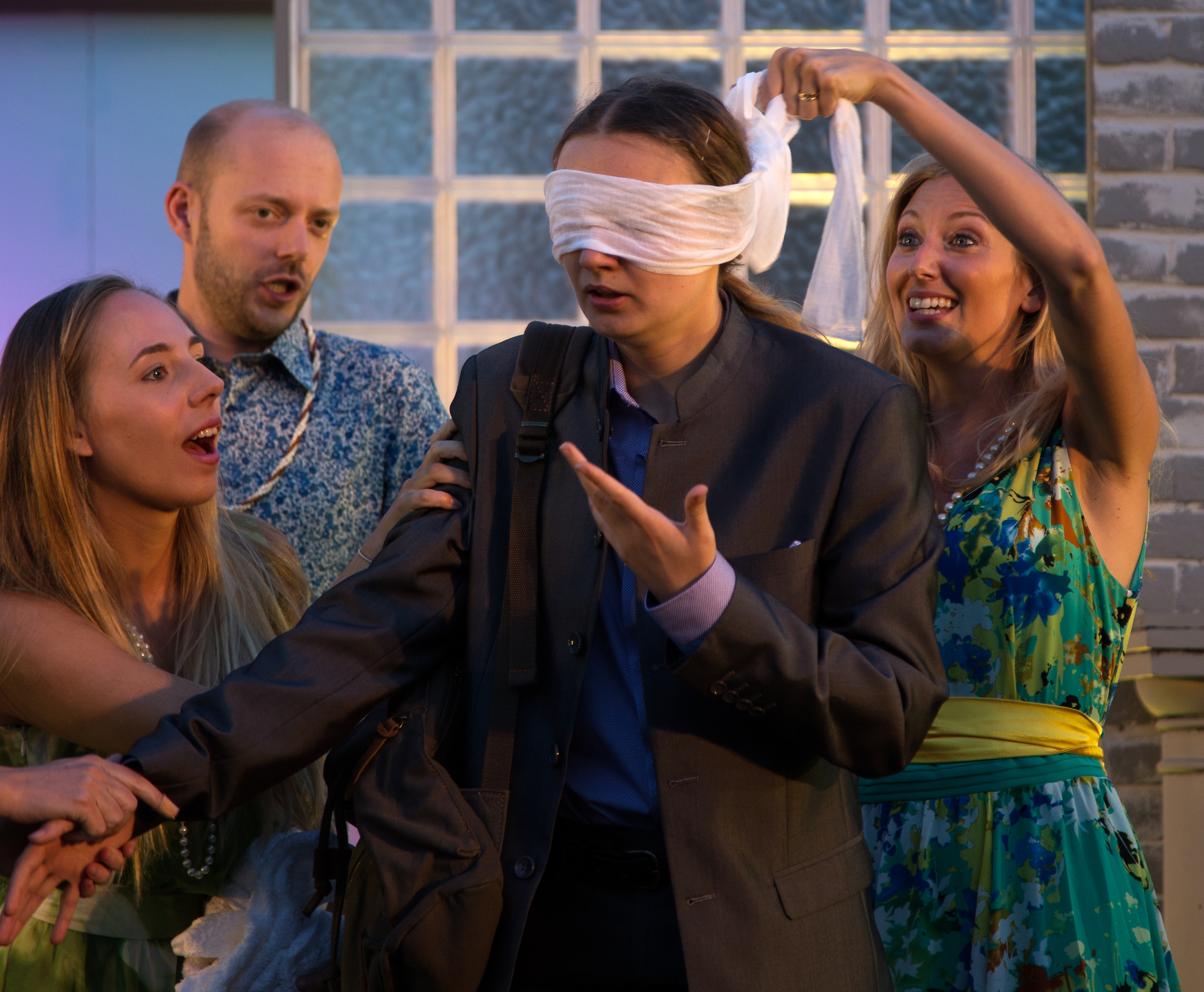
Scene from the production of Orfeo by Bampton Classical Opera in 2014, with Anna Starushkevych in the title role

Bampton Classical Opera performed his opera Orfeo ed Euridice in 2014, singing in English.

== Recordings ==
- https://www.prestomusic.com/classical/works/206063--bertoni-f-addio-o-miei-sospiro-from-tancredi/browse

Orfeo ed Euridice

- https://www.gramophone.co.uk/review/bertoni-orfeo-ed-euridice
- https://www.prestomusic.com/classical/products/7955759--bertoni-f-orfeo
- https://www.classicstoday.com/review/review-14353/
- https://www.prestomusic.com/classical/products/8006849--vivaldi-stabat-mater
- Anna Starushkevych, the Ukrainian mezzo-soprano, explains how she prepares for a role, including (from about 7:40) her role in Bampton Classical Opera's production of Bertoni's Orfeo ed Euridice.
