= Teatro San Benedetto =

Former opera house in Venice, Italy

Coordinates: 45.435259°N 12.333134°E

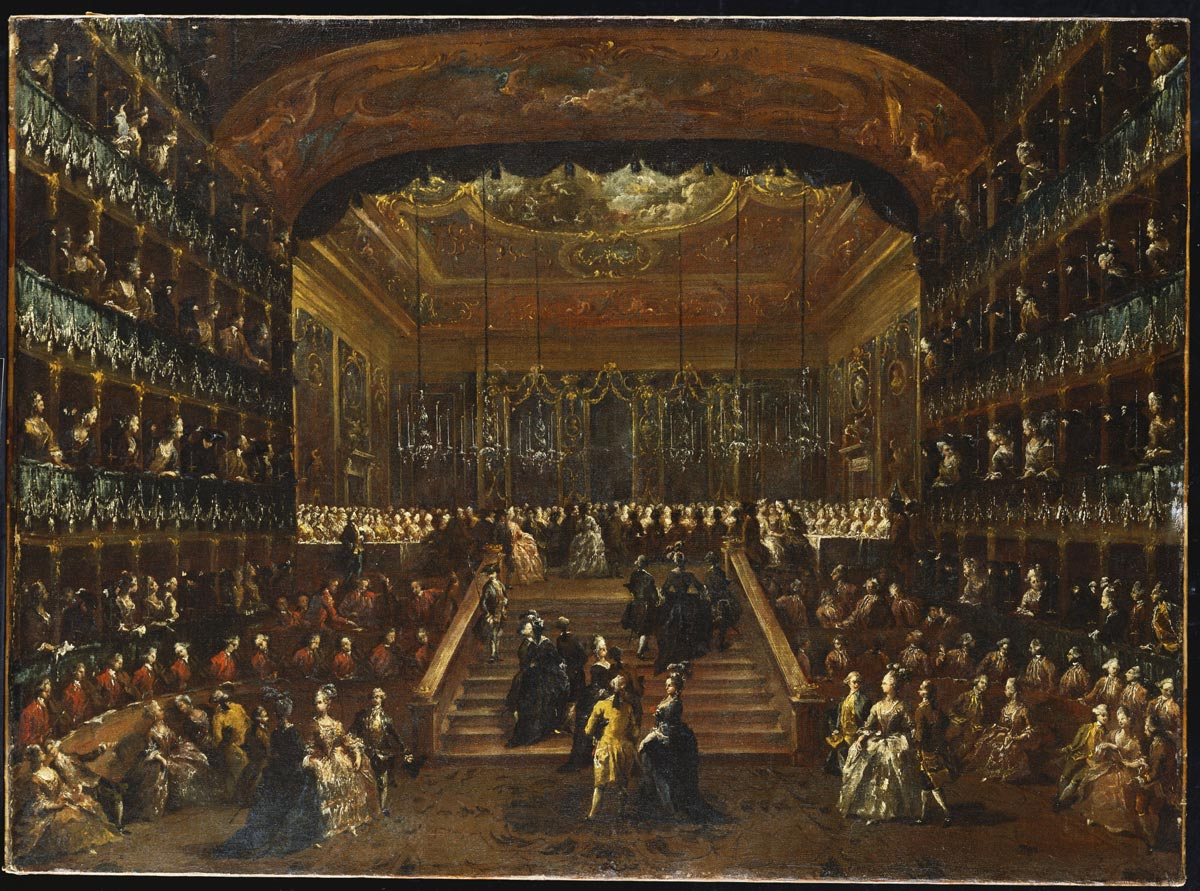
Francesco Guardi. The Dinner and Ball in honour of Count and Countess De Nord. Teatro San Benedetto, 22nd January 1782

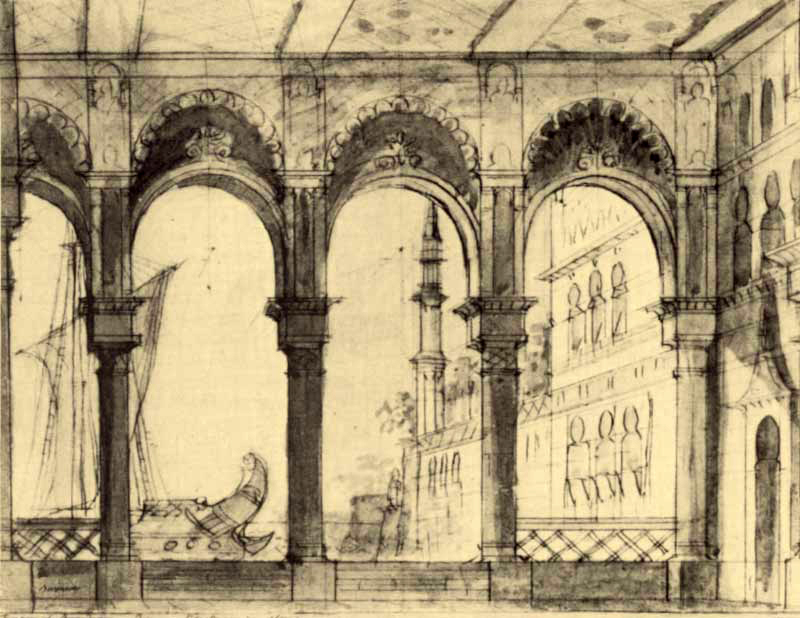
Set design by Francesco Bagnara for the production of L'italiana in Algeri at the Teatro San Benedetto in 1826

The Teatro San Benedetto was a theatre in Venice, particularly prominent in the operatic life of the city in the 18th and early 19th centuries. It saw the premieres of over 140 operas, including Rossini's L'italiana in Algeri, and was the theatre of choice for the presentation of opera seria until La Fenice was built in 1792.

== History ==
The small, elegant theatre was first constructed by Michele Grimani on land owned by the Venier family. It was inaugurated on 26 December 1755 with a performance of Gioacchino Cocchi's opera Zoe. In 1766 the ownership of the San Benedetto passed from Grimani to a consortium of patrician families in Venice who had been box holders at the theatre. The original design of the theatre was circular. However it was rebuilt in the traditional horseshoe shape following a fire on 5 February 1774.

In 1765 Vincenzo Galeotti, who danced here from 1761, became the ballet master of the theatre and staged his first ballet here (at that time besides Galeotty and his wife Antonia there were two soloists and 16 corps de ballet dancers in the company). In 1772—1773 the ballet master of San Benedetto was Gasparo Angiolini.

In 1782 Teatro San Benedetto hosted the ball in honour of Count and Countess De Nord, Russian prince Pavel Petrovich and his spouse, visiting Venice.

In 1786 the owners' consortium had to cede the theatre to the Venier family following a lawsuit, and later went on to build La Fenice. The theatre then became the Teatro Venier (or Teatro Venier in San Benedetto).

In 1810, the ownership passed to the impresario Giovanni Gallo, and for a time it was known as the Teatro Gallo. His sons, who had inherited the theatre in 1847, renamed it Teatro Rossini in 1868 in honour of Gioachino Rossini whose operas L'italiana in Algeri and Eduardo e Cristina had premiered there earlier in the century, but by then its glory days as an opera house were over.

In 1937 the building was completely remodelled as a movie theater, the Cinema Rossini, with a new facade by the Italian architect Carlo Scarpa. The cinema was closed in 2007 and underwent restoration in 2010 in a project financed by the City of Venice.

== Sources ==
- Biblioteca Nazionale Braidense (Ufficio Ricerca Fondi Musicali), Luoghi di rappresentazione: Venezia. Accessed 9 November 2009 (in Italian).
- Comune di Venezia, Ex Cinema Rossini, firmata la convenzione: ad aprile 2010 avvio dei lavori, press release of 22 April 2009. Accessed 9 November 2009 (in Italian).
- Feldman, Martha, Opera and sovereignty: transforming myths in eighteenth-century Italy, University of Chicago Press, 2007, p. 390. ISBN 0-226-24113-0
- Talbot, Michael, "Grimani", The New Grove Dictionary of Music and Musicians 2nd Edition, 2001. ISBN 0-333-60800-3
