= Niccolò Antonio Zingarelli =

Italian composer (1752–1837)

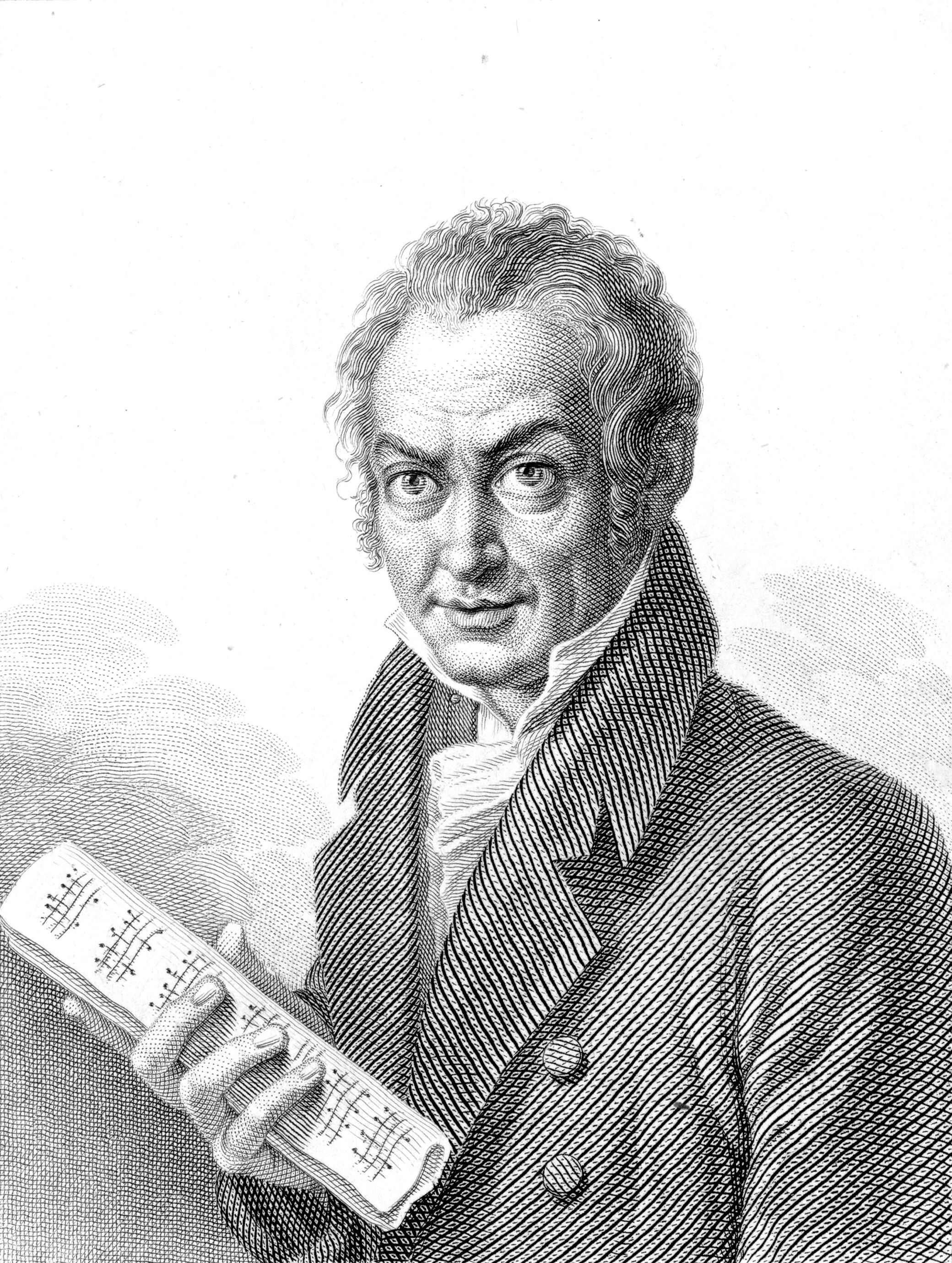
Niccolò Antonio Zingarelli

Niccolò Antonio Zingarelli (Italian pronunciation: [nikkoˈlɔ anˈtɔːnjo ddziŋɡaˈrɛlli]; 4 April 1752 – 5 May 1837) was an Italian composer, chiefly of opera during the classical period.

== Life ==
=== Early career ===
Zingarelli was born in Naples, where he studied (from the age of 7) at the Santa Maria di Loreto conservatory under Fenaroli and Speranza.

In 1789–1790 Zingarelli went to Paris to compose Antigone. He left France hurriedly at the time of the revolution and eventually returned to Italy. He was appointed maestro di cappella at Milan Cathedral in 1793, and remained there until 1794, when he took up the prestigious post of maestro di cappella at the Basilica della Santa Casa, Loreto.

=== Rome ===
In 1804, Zingarelli was appointed choir master of the Sistine Chapel in Rome. Seven years later he publicly refused, as an Italian patriot, to conduct a Te Deum for Napoleon's new-born son, known as King of Rome, in St. Peter's Basilica. As a result of this refusal he was captured and taken to Paris. Nevertheless, the Emperor was a great admirer of Zingarelli's music and soon gave the composer his liberty. In addition, Zingarelli was awarded a state pension.

=== Naples ===
In 1813, Zingarelli moved to Naples, where he became director of the conservatory. Then in 1816 he replaced Giovanni Paisiello as choir master of Naples Cathedral, a position he held until his death in 1837.

He died at Torre del Greco in 1837. Donizetti wrote a sinfonia funebre for his funeral.

== Works ==
=== Opera ===
In his early career, Zingarelli concentrated on writing opera; his debut was with the opera seria Montezuma, given at San Carlo on 13 August 1781, which aroused some interest, although the public in Naples found it too “learned”. Haydn revived it at the Eszterháza theatre in 1785.

Antigone, in which Zingarelli adopted some of the reform principles of French opera, won little favour in Paris; after that he eschewed innovation and contented himself with tried and tested formulae.

Zingarelli wrote 37 mainly comic operas in a prolific career. Between 1785 and 1803 he wrote mainly for La Scala of Milan, the first to be produced here being Alsinda. He achieved immediate success with Il mercato di Monfregoso and La secchia rapita. However Giulietta e Romeo is nowadays often considered his best opera. His last opera, Berenice, achieved considerable success in his lifetime after its initial production in Rome.

Surviving operas include:

- Montezuma (1781)
- Alsinda (1785)
- Ifigenia in Aulide (1787)
- Artaserse (1789)
- Antigone (1790)
- La morte di Cesare (1790)
- Pirro re di Epiro (1791)
- Annibale in Torino (1792)
- L'oracolo sannita (1792)
- Il mercato di Monfregoso (1792)
- Apelle (1793, revised as Apelle e Campaspe (1795)
- Quinto Fabio (1794)
- Il conte di Saldagna (1794)
- Gli Orazi e i Curiazi (1795)
- Giulietta e Romeo (1796)
- La morte di Mitridate (1797)
- Ines de Castro (1798)
- Carolina e Mexicow (1798)
- Meleagro (1798)
- Il ritratto (1799)
- Il ratto delle Sabine (1799)
- Clitennestra (1800)
- Edipo a Colono (1802)
- Il bevitore fortunato (1803)
- Berenice regina d'Armenia (1811)

There are 4 doubtful works; and 17 operas were lost including:

- La secchia rapita (1793)
- Baldovino (1811) (libretto by Jacopo Ferretti)

=== Sacred music ===
Being a deeply religious Catholic, Zingarelli devoted much of his attention to masses, oratorios, cantatas, and motets. For Loreto he composed 541 works, including 28 masses.

In 1829, aged 80, he wrote a Cantata Sacra, based on Isaiah chapter 12 for the Birmingham Music Festival. This was the occasion for the memorably inauspicious début of his protégé and representative Michael Costa, aged 19. The intention was that Costa should rehearse and conduct the work, but J. B Cramer and Thomas Greatorex elbowed him out and was instead engaged as a tenor soloist in another concert. Unfortunately both the work and Costa's singing met with ferocious criticism: "[This cantata] is one of the most tame, insipid things we were ever doomed to hear: a heap of common-place trash from the first to the last note. After twaddling in B-flat for half-an-hour, he ventures for a few bars into F, then returns to B, and there is an end." "As a singer [Costa] is far below mediocrity, and he does not compensate for his vocal deficiencies by his personal address, which is abundantly awkward. In the theatre while singing the air "Nel furor delle tempeste" [from Bellini's Il pirata] and accompanying himself, he had a narrow escape. The tempests proved contagious, and were beginning to manifest themselves in the galleries, and had he remained but a few moments longer on the stage, he would have witnessed a storm compared to which the roarings of his own Vesuvius would have seemed but a murmur."

Less than a month before his death he produced an oratorio, The Flight into Egypt, and his requiem mass, composed for his own funeral, is said to embody his most devotional church style.

=== Educational works ===
Zingarelli wrote two influential books of partimenti, which are the biggest corpus of partimenti after those of Fedele Fenaroli.

== See also ==
- See: List of music students by teacher: T to Z#Niccolò Antonio Zingarelli.
