= Carlo Francesco Pollarolo =

Italian composer (d. 1723)

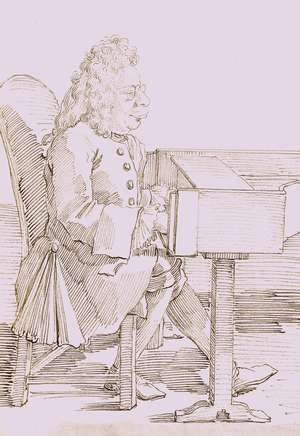
carlo francesco pollarolo, written by Pier Leone Ghezzi.

Carlo Francesco Pollarolo (ca. 1653 – 7 February 1723) was an Italian composer, organist, and music director. Known chiefly for his operas, he wrote a total of 85 of them as well as 13 oratorios. His compositional style was initially indebted to the opera tradition of Giovanni Legrenzi and Carlo Pallavicino, but he moved beyond this style with innovations to the compositional structure of the aria characterized by expanded forms and orchestral elaborations. His early work used three part strings in the Legrenzi and Pallacino tradition of orchestration, but his mid and later works had developed into a richer orchestration of five strings parts and expanded instrumentation of brass and woodwinds. He was the first Venetian opera composer and one of the earliest Italian composers to use the oboe in his opera orchestrations.

== Life and career ==
Born into the Pollarolo family of musicians in Brescia, Carlo Francesco Pollarolo was the son of musician Orazio Pollarolo. His father was the organist at the Santi Nazaro e Celso, Brescia from 1665–1669, and then at the Brescia Cathedral from 1669 through 1675. His younger brother Paolo Pollarolo (b. 1672) was also a professional musician in Brescia, and Paolo's son, Orazio Pollarolo (d. 1765), was an opera composer.

After receiving training in music from his father, Carlo Francesco began his career as the organist at the Santa Maria della Pace, Brescia; a position he held before the birth of his son, the composer Antonio Pollarolo, in 1676. Carlo Francesco also had a daughter, Giulia, who married the organ builder Giacinto Pescetti. Their son, Carlo Francesco's grandson, was the organist and composer Giovanni Battista Pescetti.

On 18 December 1676 Carlo Francesco succeeded his father as the organist at the Brescia Cathedral at which point he resigned from his position at the Santa Maria della Pace. He later was promoted to the post of "capo musico" at the Brescia Cathedral on 12 February 1680; replacing Pietro Pelli as maestro di cappella. He concurrently served as the maestro di cappella at the Accademia degli Erranti from 1681 through 1689; an institution which had staged his first opera, Venere travestita, in 1678. He did not return to opera again, until 1684 when he began a prolific career writing both operas and oratorios, first for performances in Brescia (Il Roderico, 1684) and Vienna (La Rosinda, 1685), and then for performances in nearby Venice and other Italian cities like Milan and Rome.

Carlo Francesco's operas became increasingly popular on the Venetian stage during the late 1680s, and in late 1689 he left his post at the Brescia Cathedral and re-located his family to Venice where they settled in the Santa Croce district. On 13 August 1690 he was appointed second organist at St Mark's Basilica, and two years later was promoted to the position of vicemaestro di cappella. His son Antonio succeeded him in that post ten years later.

From 1691 through 1707 Carlo Francesco was the most prolific opera composer in Venice, and he was the most frequently performed composer at the city's top opera house, the Teatro San Giovanni Grisostomo, during this period. He continued to write operas for the Venetian stage into his 60s, with his final opera, L'Arminio, being completed and staged in November 1722 while he was suffering from a fatal illness. After six months of ill health, he died on February 7, 1723. He is buried in the Scalzi, Venice.

In addition to his work as an opera composer and organist, Pollarolo was also the musical director of the Ospedale degli Incurabili, Venice, one of the city's top music conservatories, from c. 1696 to c. 1718. He composed four Latin oratorios for performance by the students at the conservatory during his tenure: Tertius crucis triumphus (1703), Samson vindicatus (1706), Joseph in Aegypto (1707), Rex regum (1716) and Davidis de Goliath triumphus (1718).

== List of operas ==
- Venere travestita (dramma per musica, libretto by Giovanni Battista Bottalino, 1678, Brescia)
- Il Roderico (dramma per musica, libretto by Giovanni Battista Bottalino, 1684, Brescia)
- I delirii per amore (dramma per musica, libretto by Francesco Miliati, 1685, Brescia)
- Il demone amante, overo Giugurta (dramma per musica, libretto by Matteo Noris, 1685, Venice)
- Il Licurgo, overo Il cieco d'acuta vista (dramma per musica, libretto by Matteo Noris, 1686, Venezia)
- La costanza gelosa negl'amori di Cefalo e Procri (dramma per musica, 1688, Verona)
- Antonino e Pompeiano (dramma per musica, libretto by Giacomo Francesco Bussani, 1689, Brescia; a reworking of the piece of the same name by Antonio Sartorio)
- Alboino in Italia (dramma per musica, libretto by Giulio Cesare Corradi, 1691, Venezia)
- Il moto delle stelle osservato da Cupido (serenata, 1691, Padua)
- La pace fra Tolomeo e Seleuco (dramma per musica, libretto by Adriano Morselli, based on Rodogune by Pierre Corneille, 1691, Venice)
- Onorio in Roma (dramma per musica, libretto by Giovanni Matteo Giannini, based on Stilichon by Pierre Corneille, 1692, Venice)
- Marc'Antonio (dramma per musica, libretto by Matteo Noris, 1692, Genoa)
- Iole, regina di Napoli (dramma per musica, libretto di Giulio Cesare Corradi, 1692, Venezia)
- L'Ibraim sultano (dramma per musica, libretto di Adriano Morselli, basato su Bajazet di Jean Racine, 1692, Venezia)
- La forza della virtù (dramma per musica, libretto di Domenico David, basato su Storia di Spagna di Rogatis, 1693, Venezia; ripreso anche come Creonte tiranno di Tebe, 1699, Napoli)
- Gl'avvenimenti d'Erminia e di Clorinda (dramma per musica, libretto di Giulio Cesare Corradi, basato su Gerusalemme liberata di Torquato Tasso, 1693, Venezia)
- Amage, regina de' Sarmati (dramma per musica, libretto di Giulio Cesare Corradi, 1693, Venezia)
- Ottone (tragedia per musica, libretto di Girolamo Frigimelica Roberti, 1694, Venezia)
- La schiavitù fortunata (dramma per musica, libretto di Fulgenzio Maria Gualazzi, 1694, Venezia)
- Irene (tragedia per musica, libretto di Girolamo Frigimelica Roberti, 1694, Venezia)
- Alfonso primo (dramma per musica, dopo Rogatis, 1694, Venezia)
- La Santa Genuinda, overo L'innocenza difesa dall'inganno (3° atto) (dramma sacro per musica, libretto di Pietro Ottoboni, basato su Santi di Fiandra di Molano, 1694, Roma; in collaborazione con Giovanni Lorenzo Lulier (1° atto) e Alessandro Scarlatti (2° atto))
- Il pastore d'Anfriso (tragedia pastorale, libretto di Girolamo Frigimelica Roberti, basato su le Georgiche di Virgilio, 1695, Venezia)
- La Falsirena (dramma per musica, libretto di Rinaldo Calli, 1695, Ferrara)
- La Rosimonda (tragedia per musica, libretto di Girolamo Frigimelica Roberti, 1695, Venezia)
- Ercole in cielo (tragedia per musica, libretto di Girolamo Frigimelica Roberti, 1696, Venezia)
- Almansore in Alimena (dramma per musica, libretto di Giovanni Matteo Giannini, 1696, Reggio Emilia)
- Gli inganni felici (dramma per musica, libretto di Apostolo Zeno, after Erodoto, 1696, Venezia)
- Amor e dovere (dramma per musica, libretto di Domenico David, 1696, Venezia)
- Tito Manlio (dramma per musica, libretto di Matteo Noris, 1696, Firenze)
- I reggi equivoci (dramma per musica, libretto di Matteo Noris, 1697, Venezia)
- La forza d'amore (dramma per musica, libretto di Lorenzo Burlini, 1697, Venezia)
- L'Oreste in Sparta (dramma per musica, libretto di Pompeo Luchesi, 1697, Reggio Emilia)
- Circe abbandonata da Ulisse (dramma per musica, libretto di Aurelio Aureli, 1697, Venezia)
- La clemenza d'Augusto (2° atto) (dramma per musica, libretto di Carlo Sigismondo Caprese, 1697, Roma; in collaborazione con Severo De Luca (1° atto) e Giovanni Bononcini (3° atto))
- Marzio Coriolano (dramma per musica, libretto di Matteo Noris, 1698, Venezia)
- L'enigma disciolto (favola pastorale, libretto di Giovanni Battista Neri, 1698, Reggio Emilia; ripresa come Gli amici rivali, 1705, Venezia)
- L'Ulisse sconosciuto in Itaca (dramma per musica, libretto di Matteo Noris, 1698, Reggio Emilia)
- Il Faramondo (dramma per musica, libretto di Apostolo Zeno, dopo Calprende. 1698, Venezia)
- Il ripudio d'Ottavia (dramma per musica, libretto di Matteo Noris, 1699, Venezia)
- L'oracolo in sogno (3° atto) (dramma per musica, libretto di Francesco Silvani, 1699, Mantova; in collaborazione con Antonio Caldara (1° atto) e Antonio Quintavalle (2° atto))
- Lucio Vero (dramma per musica, libretto di Apostolo Zeno, 1699, Venezia)
- Il giudizio di Paride (intermezzo, 1699, Venezia)
- Il colore fa' la regina (dramma per musica, libretto di Matteo Noris, 1700, Venezia)
- Il delirio comune per l'incostanza dei genii (dramma per musica, libretto di Matteo Noris, 1700, Venezia)
- L'inganno di Chirone (melodramma, libretto di Pietro D'Averara, 1700, Milano)
- Le pazzie degli amanti (dramma per musica, libretto di Francesco Passarini, 1701, Vienna)
- Catone Uticenze (dramma per musica, libretto di Matteo Noris, 1701, Venezia)
- L'odio e l'amore (dramma per musica, libretto di Matteo Noris, 1702, Venezia)
- Ascanio (dramma per musica, libretto di Pietro D'Averara, 1702, Milano)
- Venceslao (dramma per musica, libretto di Apostolo Zeno, dopo Corneille, 1703, Venezia)
- La fortuna per dote (tragicommedia, libretto di Girolamo Frigimelica Roberti, 1704, Venezia)
- L'eroico amore (tragicommedia, libretto di M. A. Gasparini, 1704, Bergamo)
- Il giorno di notte (dramma per musica, libretto di Matteo Noris, 1704, Venezia)
- Il Dafni (tragedia satirica in musica, libretto di Girolamo Frigimelica Roberti, 1705, Venezia)
- La fede ne' tradimenti (dramma per musica, libretto di Girolamo Gigli, 1705, Venezia)
- Filippo, re della Grecia (dramma per musica, libretto di Pietro Giorgio Barziza, dopo Livio, 1706, Venezia)
- Flavio Bertarido, re dei Langobardi (dramma per musica, libretto di Stefano Ghisi, 1706, Venezia)
- La fede riconosciuta (drama pastorale per musica, libretto di Pasquaglio, 1707, Vicenza)
- La vendetta d'amore (pastorale per musica, 1707, Rovigo)
- L'Ergisto (dramma pastorale, libretto Francesco Passarini, 1708, Rovigo)
- Igene, regina di Sparta (dramma per musica, libretto di Aurelio Aureli, 1708, Vicenza)
- Il falso Tiberino (dramma per musica, libretto di Pietro Pariati e Apostolo Zeno, 1709, Venezia)
- La ninfa riconosciuta (melodramma pastorale, libretto di Francesco Silvani, 1709, Vicenza)
- Il Costantino pio (dramma posto in musica, libretto di Pietro Ottoboni, 1710, Roma)
- Amor per gelosia (favola pastorale, 1710, Roma)
- Engelberta, o La forza dell'innocenza (dramma per musica, 1711, Brescia)
- La Costanza in trionfo (dramma per musica, 1711, Brescia)
- Publio Cornelio Scipione (dramma per musica, libretto di Agostino Piovene, dopo Plutarco, 1712, Venezia)
- Peribea in Salamina (dramma per musica, 1712, Vicenza)
- L'infedeltà punita (dramma per musica, libretto di Francesco Silvani, 1712, Venezia; in collaborazione con Antonio Lotti)
- Spurio postumio (dramma per musica, libretto di Agostino Piovene, 1712, Venezia)
- Eraclio (3° atto) (dramma per musica, libretto di Pietro Antonio Bernardoni, 1712, Roma; in collaborazione con Francesco Gasparini (2° atto))
- Giulio Cesare nell'Egitto (dramma per musica, libretto di Antonio Ottoboni, 1713, Roma)
- Semiramide (dramma per musica, libretto di Francesco Silvani, 1714, Venezia)
- Marsia deluso (favola pastorale, libretto di Agostino Piovene, 1714, Venezia)
- Il trionfo della costanza (dramma per musica, 1714, Vicenza)
- Tetide in Sciro (dramma per musica, libretto di Carlo Sigismondo Capece, 1715, Vicenza)
- Il germanico (dramma per musica, libretto di Pietro Giorgio Barziza, 1716, Venezia)
- Ariodante (dramma per musica, libretto di Antonio Salvi, 1716, Venezia)
- L'innocenza riconosciuta (dramma per musica, libretto di Tommaso Malipiero, 1717, Venezia)
- Farnace (dramma per musica, libretto di Domenico Lalli, 1718, Venezia)
- Amore in gara col fasto (dramma per musica, libretto di Francesco Silvani, 1718, Rovigo)
- Astinome (dramma per musica, libretto di o di Domenico Ottavio Petrosellini, 1719, Roma)
- Il pescatore disingannato (epitalamio musicale, 1721, Venezia)
- L'Arminio (dramma per musica, libretto di Francesco Salvi, 1722, Venezia)

== Sources ==
- The Viking Opera Guide ed. Holden (Viking, 1993)
- Magazine de l'opéra baroque (in French)
- Free scores by Carlo Francesco Pollarolo at the International Music Score Library Project (IMSLP)
