= Adriano Morselli =

Venetian librettist

Adriano Morselli was a Venetian librettist active between 1679 and 1691. His libretti have been set to music by composers like Antonio Vivaldi, Alessandro Scarlatti, Giacomo Antonio Perti, Bernardo Sabadini, Carlo Francesco Pollarolo and Domenico Gabrielli. His most popular works were L'incoronazione di Dario from 1684 and Tullo Ostilio from 1685, and the unfinished La pace fra Seleuco e Tolomeo from 1691.

== Published and performed works ==
- 1679: Candaule re di Lidia (reprinted 1680); performed in 1679 with music by Pietro Andrea Ziani, and in 1706 with music by Domenico Natale Sarro
- 1682: Temistocle in bando, with music by Antonio Giannettini (reprinted 1698)
- 1683: Falaride, tiranno d'Agrigento, music by Giovanni Battista Bassani
- 1683: Apio Claudio; performed in 1693 with music by Giovanni Marco Martini
- 1683: L'innocenza risorta, ovvero L'etio (reprinted 1686, 1693); performed with music by Pietro Andrea Ziani
- 1684: L'incoronazione di Dario: 1684 performance with music by Domenico Freschi, 1686 performance with music by Giacomo Antonio Perti, 1705 performance with music by Giuseppe Antonio Vincenzo Aldrovandini, and 1717 performance in Venice with music by Antonio Vivaldi
- 1685: Tullo Ostilio (reprinted 1694, 1702: reprinted 1695 as Alba soggiogata da Romani; reprinted in Vienna in 1740 as I tre difensori della patria); music by Marc'Antonio Ziani in 1685, by Giovanni Bononcini in 1694, by Giuseppe Vignola in 1707, and by Giovanni Battista Pescetti in 1729
- 1686: La Teodora Augusta (reprinted 1687, 1693): performed with music by Alessandro Scarlatti in 1692 and by Giuseppe Vignola in 1709
- 1686: Il Mauritio (reprinted 1687, 1692; reprinted 1694 as Tiberio in Bisanzio): music by Domenico Gabrielli (1686) and Francesco Maria Mannucci (1707)
- 1688: Il Gordiano (reprinted 1700): music by Domenico Gabrielli
- 1688: Carlo il grande, with music by Domenico Gabrielli
- 1689: Augurio di felice prole
- 1689: Amulio, e Numitore: performed with music by Giuseppe Felice Tosi
- 1690: Il Pirro e Demetrio, with music by Giuseppe Felice Tosi in 1690 and by Alessandro Scarlatti in 1694; translated in English as Pyrrhus and Demetrius by Owen Swiny (1709, reprinted 1716)
- 1690: L'incoronazione di Serse, with music by Giuseppe Felice Tosi
- 1691: La pace fra Seleuco e Tolomeo, music by Bernardo Sabadini with additional texts by Aurelio Aureli; another 1691 performance with music by Carlo Francesco Pollarolo and additional text by Pierre Corneille; 1720 performance with music by Francesco Gasparini, additional texts by Andrea Trabucco
- 1692: L'Ibraim sultano, music by Carlo Francesco Pollarolo, additional text by Jean Racine
