= Teatro San Angelo =

Opera house in Venice, 1677–1803

Coordinates: 45.4356°N 12.3303°E

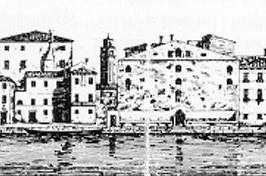

The Teatro San Angelo (in Venetian) or Teatro Sant'Angelo (in Italian) was once a theatre in Venice which ran from 1677 until 1803.

It was the last of the major Venetian theatres to be built in the 1650s–60s opera craze following Teatro Santi Giovanni e Paolo in 1654, Teatro San Samuele 1655, Teatro San Salvatore 1661, Teatro San Giovanni Crisostomo in 1667.

The Teatro San Angelo was located in the Campo San[t'] Angelo, facing the Grand Canal and Rialto Bridge, on the sites of two demolished palazzi belonging to the Marcellos and Capellos. The project was completed in 1676 by Francesco Santorini, and opened in 1677 under the families of Benedetto Marcello and the Capellos.

The house was opened with the opera Helena rapita da Paride of Domenico Freschi, (1677) and continued with operas by Freschi, Gasparini, Albinoni and Bononcini. From around 1715 onwards the house was best known as the venue of many of the operas of Antonio Vivaldi. Under Vivaldi the opera house became increasingly populist and commercial. Soon theatre was home to the operas of Baldassare Galuppi, (Argenide 1733), and plays of Goldoni.

In the 1790s the Abate Pietro Chiari wrote for the Teatro San Angelo, and in 1797 Casanova wrote an attack on Chiari incurring the enmity of Antonio Condulmer, co-owner of the theatre and a member of the Council of Ten. At this point the theatre was in terminal decline.

The theatre closed in 1803 and was converted into a warehouse. It was then demolished and rebuilt as the Barocci Palazzo, today the four star Hotel NH Collection Palazzo Barocci.

== Selected premieres ==
- The first opera of Antonio Lotti: Il trionfo dell'innocenza 1693
- Play La locandiera by Carlo Goldoni
- Helena rapita da Paride Domenico Freschi, 1677
- Tullia superba Domenico Freschi, 1678
- La Circe Domenico Freschi, 1679
- Sardanapalo Domenico Freschi, 1679
- Pompeo Magno in Cilicia Domenico Freschi, 1681
- Olimpia vendicata Domenico Freschi, 1681
- Giulio Cesare trionfante Domenico Freschi, 1682
- Silla Domenico Freschi, 1683
- Apio Claudio Marco Martini, 1683
- L'incoronatione di Dario Domenico Freschi, 1684
- Teseo tra le rivali Domenico Freschi, 1685
- Falarido tiranno d'Agrigento Giovanni Battista Bassani, 1685
- Il vitio depresso e la virtù coronata di Teofilo Orgiani, 1686
- Il Dioclete Teofilo Orgiani, 1687
- La fortuna tra le disgratie Paolo Biagio, 1688
- La Rosaura Giacomo Antonio Perti, 1689
- Il trionfo dell'innocenza Antonio Lotti, 1693
- Il principe selvaggio Michelangelo Gasparini, 1696
- Radamisto Tomaso Albinoni, 1698
- Diomede punito da Alcide Tomaso Albinoni, 1700
- L'inganno innocente Tomaso Albinoni, 1701
- Tiberio imperatore d'Oriente Francesco Gasparini, 1702
- Giuseppe Boniventi di Giuseppe Boniventi, 1702
- Farnace Antonio Caldara, 1703
- Pirro Giuseppe Antonio Vincenzo Aldrovandini, 1704
- Virginio consolo Antonio Giannettini, 1704
- Artaserse Antonio Giannettini, 1705
- Creso tolto alle fiamme Girolamo Polani, 1705
- La regina creduta re Giovanni Bononcini, 1706
- La fede tra gl'inganni Tomaso Albinoni, 1707
- Ifiginia Agostino Bonaventura Coletti, 1707
- Armida al campo Giuseppe Boniventi, 1708
- L'Endimione Giuseppe Boniventi, 1709
- Il tradimento premiato Girolamo Polani, 1709
- Berengario re d'Italia Girolamo Polani, 1709
- Circe delusa Giuseppe Boniventi, 1711
- La costanza in cimento con la crudeltà Floriano Arresti, 1712
- Le passioni per troppo amore Johann David Heinichen, 1713
- Nerone fatto Cesare Francesco Gasparini, 1715
- Rodomento sdegnato Michelangelo Gasparini, 1715
- Alessandro fra le Amazoni di Fortunato Chelleri, 1715
- L'amor di figlio non conosciuto di Tomaso Albinoni, 1716
- Penelope la casta Fortunato Chelleri, 1717
- Meleagro Tomaso Albinoni, 1718
- Cleomene Tomaso Albinoni, 1718
- La caduta di Gelone Giuseppe Maria Buini, 1719
- Amalasunta Fortunato Chelleri, 1719
- Il pentimento generoso Andrea Stefano Fiorè, 1719
- Armida delusa Giuseppe Maria Buini, 1720
- Filippo re Macedonia Giuseppe Boniventi e Antonio Vivaldi, 1720
- Il pastor fido Carlo Luigi Pietragrua, 1721
- Melinda e Tiburzio Giuseppe Maria Orlandini, 1721
- La fede ne' tradimenti Carlo Luigi Pietragrua, 1721
- Gli eccessi della gelosia Tomaso Albinoni, 1722
- L'amor tirannico Fortunato Chelleri, 1722
- Timocrate Leonardo Leo, 1723
- Medea e Giasone Francesco Brusa, 1726
- Gl'odelusi dal sangue Baldassare Galuppi e Giovanni Battista Pescetti, 1728
- Dorinda Baldassare Galuppi e Giovanni Battista Pescetti, 1729
- I tre difensori della patria Giovanni Battista Pescetti, 1729
- Elenia Tomaso Albinoni, 1730
- Gli sponsali d'Enea Bartolomeo Cordans, 1731
- Ardelinda Tomaso Albinoni, 1732
- Grullo e Moschetta Giuseppe Maria Orlandini, 1732
- Alessandro nelle Indie Giovanni Battista Pescetti, 1732
- L'ortolana contessa Giuseppe Maria Buini e altri, 1732
- La caduta Leone, imperator d'Oriente Giuseppe Antonio Paganelli, 1732
- Argenide Baldassare Galuppi, 1733
- Ginestra e Lichetto Giuseppe Antonio Paganelli, 1733
- L'ambizione depressa Baldassare Galuppi, 1733
- Tigrane Giuseppe Antonio Paganelli, 1733
- Motezuma Antonio Vivaldi, 1733
- Candalide Tomaso Albinoni, 1734
- Tamiri Baldassare Galuppi, 1734
- Lucio Vero Francesco Araja, 1735
- Elisa regina Tiro Baldassare Galuppi, 1736
- Ergilda Baldassare Galuppi, 1736
- Artaserse Longimano Antonio Gaetano Pampani, 1737
- Ezio Giovanni Battista Lampugnani, 1737
- Argenide Pietro Chiarini, 1738
- Achille in Sciro Pietro Chiarini, 1739
- Candaspe (Campaspe) regina de' Sciti Giovanni Battista Casali, 1740
- Berenice Baldassare Galuppi, 1741
- Artamene Tomaso Albinoni, 1741
- Il vincitor se stesso Ignazio Fiorillo, 1741
- L'impresario delle Isole Canarie Leonardo Leo, 1741
- Ambleto Giuseppe Carcani, 1742
- Armida Ferdinando Bertoni, 1746
- La caduta d'Amulio Antonio Gaetano Pampani, 1746
- Scipione nelle Spagne Baldassare Galuppi, 1746
- Il re dispietato Giuseppe Maria Buini, 1747
- Tigrane Giovanni Battista Lampugnani, 1747
- L'Arcadia in Brenta Baldassare Galuppi, 1749
- Amor contadino Giovanni Battista Lampugnani, 1760
- Amore in caricatura Vincenzo Legrenzio Ciampi, 1761
- L'amore artigiano Gaetano Latilla, 1761
- Siface Domenico Fischietti, 1761
- Li scherzi d'amore Francesco Maggiore, 1762
- Tieste Ugo Foscolo, 1797
- Riverente gratulazione per le glorie Francesco II Francesco Gardi, 1799
- Il medico a suo dispetto, ossia La muta per amore Francesco Gardi, 1800
- Il carretto del venditore d'aceto Johann Simon Mayr, 1800
- La casa da vendere Giuseppe Antonio Capuzzi or Francesco Gardi, 1804

== See also ==
- Opera houses and theatres of Venice
