= Giulia Francesca Zuffi =

Italian opera singer (fl.1678–85)

Giulia Francesca Zuffi (fl.1678–1685) was an Italian operatic soprano.

In 1678, she sang in Venice at the opening of the Teatro San Giovanni Grisostomo (later the Teatro Malibran), in Carlo Pallavicino's Vespasiana. In 1683, she sang in Naples, including in the first performances of Alessandro Scarlatti's Aldimiro, o vero Favor per favore and Psiche, o vero Amore innamorato. In 1684 she appeared in a revival of Scarlatti's Pompeo and another of Giovanni Legrenzi's Giustino, and in the first performance of Epaminonda by Severo De Luca, and in 1685 she sang in the revival of Pallavicino's Galieno.

Her career "seems to have prospered with Carpio's patronage", i.e. that of Gaspar Méndez de Haro, 7th Marquess of Carpio, to whom she may have been recommended by the Spanish ambassador in Venice. It has been suggested that "Carpio attempted to recreate in Naples something like the closely knit resident team that had worked for him in Madrid", including Zuffi.
