= 1699 in music =

The year 1699 in music involved some significant events.

== Events ==
- February – Richard Leveridge, Daniel Purcell and Jeremiah Clarke collaborate on the music for an adaptation of Fletcher's The Island Princess.
- John Blow is appointed to the newly created post of Composer to the Chapel Royal in England.
- Antonio Caldara appointed maestro di cappella da chiesa e del teatro to Ferdinando Carlo, the last Gonzaga Duke of Mantua.
- Quirinus Blankenburg is appointed organist at the Nieuwe Kerk in The Hague (however, he only started working there in 1702 after the new organ was completed).

== Classical music ==
- Carlo Agostino Badia
  - Imeneo trionfante, serenata for the wedding of Joseph I and Wilhelmine Amalie of Braunschweig-Lüneburg
  - Tributi armonici, 12 chamber cantatas (published circa 1699)
- Heinrich Ignaz Franz von Biber – Sonata violino solo representativa
- Giovanni Battista Brevi – La devotione canora: motetti, libro II, motets for voice and basso continuo
- Antonio Caldara
  - Suonate da camera, op. 2; twelve trio sonatas
  - Cantate da camera a voce sola, op. 3; twelve cantatas
- André Campra
  - Carnaval de Venise
  - Missa 'Ad majorem Dei gloriam'
  - Motets, Livre 2
- Michel Richard Delalande – Confitebor tibi Domine in consilio, S.56
- Rocco Greco – 31 sinfonie, 10 passacaglie, 11 brani strumentali
- Nicolas de Grigny – Premier livre d'orgue, an organ Mass and hymn settings, comprising 42 pieces; second edition published in 1711
- George Frideric Handel – Trio Sonata in G minor, HWV 387
- Johann Pachelbel – Hexachordum Apollinis, six arias with variations for keyboard
- Daniel Purcell – Ode for St Cecilia's Day, the second of the three such pieces by the composer
- Alessandro Scarlatti – Clori mia, Clori bella, H.129

== Publications ==
- The first issue of Mercurius Musicus: or, the Monthly Collection of New Teaching Songs, one of the earliest planned periodicals of music scores, was published in London

== Opera ==
- Antonio Caldara – L'oracolo in sogno
- Carlo Agostino Badia – Il Narciso
- Heinrich Ignaz Franz von Biber – Trattenimento musicale del'ossequio di Salisburgo (large cantata; his last)
- Francesco Gasparini – Mirena e Floro
- Johann Mattheson – Die Plejades
- Antonio Quintavalle, Antonio Caldara, and Antonio Pollarolo – L'oracolo in sogno
- Alessandro Scarlatti – Gl'Inganni felici

== Theoretical writings ==
- Johan Georg Ahlens musikalisches Herbst-Gespräche by Johann Georg Ahle, on consonance and dissonance. Third part of Ahle's Musikalische Gespräche series of treatises in form of dialogues.
- Primi elementi di musica per li principianti by Giovanni Battista Brevi

== Births ==
- January 14 – Jakob Adlung, musician (died 1762)
- February 14 – Tobias Henrich Schubart librettist for Georg Telemann (died 1747)
- March 25 – Johann Adolph Hasse, composer (died 1783)
- May 4 – Giacomo Francesco Milano Franco d'Aragona, composer (died 1780)
- November 13 – Jan Zach, violinist, organist and composer (died 1773)
- December 17 – Charles-Louis Mion, composer (died 1775)
- December 23 – Joseph Gibbs, composer (died 1788)
- date unknown
  - René de Galard de Béarn, Marquis de Brassac, soldier and amateur composer (died 1771)
  - Johann Friedrich Ruhe, composer (died 1776)

== Deaths ==
- June 1 – Jean Rousseau, viol player and composer (born 1644)
- April 11 – Friedrich Christian Bressand, librettist (born 1670)
- October 20 – Friedrich Funcke, composer (born 1642)
- December 30 – Pierre Robert, composer (born c.1618)
- December 31 – Andreas Armsdorff, composer and organist
- date unknown
  - Mario Agatea, singer, composer and instrument maker (born c.1623–28)
  - Isaac Blackwell, composer and organist
  - José Marín, composer (born 1619)
  - Charles Mouton, composer and lutenist (born 1617)
  - Pierre Robert, composer (born 1618)
