= L'incoronazione di Dario (Perti) =

L'incoronazione di Dario (The Coronation of Darius) is an opera in three acts composed by Giacomo Antonio Perti to an Italian libretto by Adriano Morselli (revised by Giorgio Maria Raparini). It was first performed on 13 January 1686, at the Teatro Malvezzi in Bologna. Morselli originally wrote the libretto for Domenico Freschi's opera Dario which premiered at the Teatro San Angelo in Venice in 1685. Other later uses of the libretto include Giuseppe Aldrovandini's 1705 L'incoronazione di Dario (with the libretto revised by Andrea del Pò) and Vivaldi's 1717 L'incoronazione di Dario (with the libretto revised by an unknown author).

== Roles ==
- Dario, claimant to the throne of King Cyrus (tenor)
- Statira, daughter of King Cyrus (contralto)
- Argene, daughter of King Cyrus (contralto)
- Flora (contralto)
- Alinda (soprano)
- Arpago, claimant to the throne of King Cyrus (soprano)
- Oronte, claimant to the throne of King Cyrus (soprano castrato)
- Ombra di Ciro, the ghost of King Cyrus (tenor)
- Niceno, tutor to Statira and Argene (bass)
- Apollo (bass)

== Sources ==
- Casaglia, Gherardo (2005)."L´incoronazione di Dario, 13 January 1686". L'Almanacco di Gherardo Casaglia (in Italian).
- Fantuzzi, Giovanni (1789). Notizie degli scrittori bolognesi, Volume 7. Stamperia di S. Tommaso d'Aquino, pp. 171–172 (in Italian)
- Olschki, Leo S. (1979). Il teatro musicale di Antonio Vivaldi. Biblioteca degli Historiae Musicae Cultores, p. 101 (in Italian)
