= Girolamo Frigimelica Roberti =

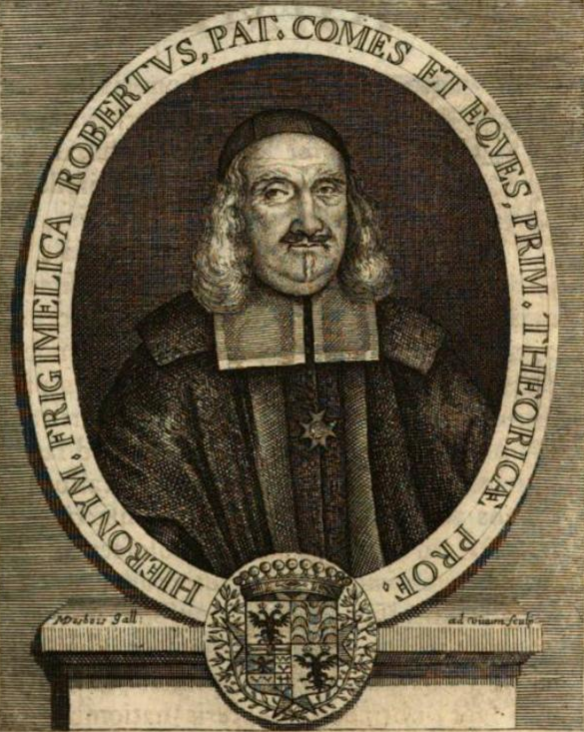
Martial Desbois - Gerolamo Frigimelica Roberti.

Girolamo Frigimelica Roberti (10 January 1653 - 15 November 1732) was an Italian architect, librettist, and poet.

== Biography ==
Born in Padua, Republic of Venice, to a father who had married into the noble Robert family, thus gaining a title of Count for his son. Gerolamo acquired a broad humanist education and from 1691 to 1720 was curator of the public library of Padua and admitted as member to its Accademia galileiana di scienze, lettere ed arti or Accademia dei Ricovrati.

In 1721, he moved to Modena. He was now active mainly as an architect, designing palaces and churches in Padua, Vicenza, and Modena. He worked on the Cappella del Santissimo at the Basilica di Sant'Antonio di Padova and made designs for the churches of Santa Maria del Torresino and Santa Lucia at Padua. He also made designs for the church of San Gaetano in Vicenza, and the palaces Mussato and Buzzacarini in Padua; and the enlargement for the Palazzo Pisani a San Stefano in Venice.

He is known for having produced an initial plan in 1716 for Villa Pisani at Stra, however, the densely detailed design, with a central pavilion cramped with columns, was rejected by the patron Alvise Pisani. The design for the central pavilion seemed more apt for a Venetian Palazzo. Instead a more sober, Neoclassical design was adopted after his death by Francesco Maria Preti.

Also important to Frigimelica was his work as a librettist for opera. His first 11 texts were written for the Teatro San Giovanni Grisostomo of Venice, and set to music between 1694 and 1708 by Carlo Francesco Pollarolo, Alessandro Scarlatti, Antonio Caldara, and Luigi Mancia. Later works were produced mainly for the Teatro Obizzi of Padua.

He worked in a style of opera seria similar to Apostolo Zeno, Francesco Silvani, and Adriano Morselli. His libretti consisted of five acts and were about historic and mythologic subjects, and were called tragedies or tragic-comedies. he also wrote the text for seven musical oratorios, performed between 1697 and 1702. He died in Modena.

His relationship to Antonio Frigimelica Roberti, an 18th-century academic, or Francesco Frigimelica il Vecchio, a painter, is unclear.
