= Johann Philipp Förtsch =

German baroque composer, statesman and doctor

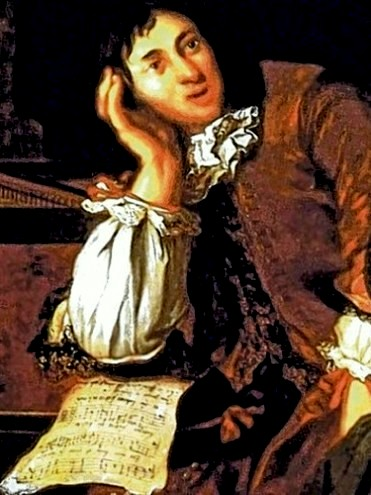
Johann Wilhelm Förtsch

Johann Philipp Förtsch (14 May 1652 – 14 December 1732) was a German baroque composer, statesman and medical doctor.

== Life ==
Förtsch was born in Wertheim and possibly received his musical education from Johann Philipp Krieger. Moving to Hamburg in 1674 to write librettos, he then became in the 1680s one of the main composers in the heyday of the Oper am Gänsemarkt. In later life he returned to medicine.

== Works ==
Operas (all lost)

- Das unmöglichste Ding (Lukas von Bostel, after Lope de Vega, 1684)
- Der hochmüthige, gestürzte und wieder erhabene Crösus (Lukas von Bostel, after Nicolò Minato, 1684)
- Der Grosse Alexander in Sidon (Christian Heinrich Postel, after Aurelio Aureli, Hamburg 1688)
- Die Heilige Eugenia, or the Conversion of Alexandria to Christianity (Christian Heinrich Postel, probably after Girolamo Bartolommei, Hamburg 1688)
- Der im Christenthum biß in den Todt beständige Märtyrer Polyeuctes (Heinrich Elmenhorst, after Pierre Corneille, Hamburg 1688)
- Der mächtige Monarch der Perser, Xerxes, in Abidus (Christian Heinrich Postel after Nicolò Minato, UA Hamburg 1689)
- Cain und Abel, oder der verzweifelnde Bruder-Mörder (Christian Heinrich Postel, after Michael Johansen, 1689)
- Die betrübte und erfreuete Cimbria (Christian Heinrich Postel, UA Hamburg 1689)
- Die Groß-Müthige Thalestris, oder Letzte Königin der Amazonen (Christian Heinrich Postel, after Gaultier de Coste, Hamburg 1690)
- Ancile romanum, das ist des Römischen Reichs Glücks-Schild (Christian Heinrich Postel, Hamburg 1690)
- Bajazeth und Tamerlan (Christian Heinrich Postel, after Giulio Cesare Corradi, UA Hamburg 1690)
- Der irrende Ritter Don Quixotte de la Mancia (Hinrich Hinsch, after Miguel de Cervantes, 1690)

82 "geistliche Konzerte" (surviving) including:

- Du Heiden Trost [08:07] on the Annunciation to Mary
- Kommt, lasset uns gehen gen Bethlehem [06:42] on the shepherds
- Wer Jesum liebt [09:35]
- Herr, wie lange wilstu mein so gar vergessen? [06:13] Psalm 13
- Die Wunder sind zu groß [06:18] on John the Baptist
- Aus der Tiefen [08:04] Psalm 130
- Ihr Sünder, tretet bald herzu [08:54] on the parable of the Pharisee and the Publican
- Wohl dem, der nicht wandelt im Rat der Gottlosen [12:50] Psalm 1
- Mensch, was du trust [12:20] on the Rich man and Lazarus

Instrumental works

- 32 Canons on Christ, der du bist der helle Tag, 1680
- Canon perpetuus a 4 on the same chorale
- Allemande a 4
- Canons
- Counterpoint studies
- Triple fugue

Theoretical publications

- Musicalischer Compositions Tractat
- Von den dreyfachen Contrapunkten

== Selected discography ==
- Dialogs, Psalms & Sacred Concertos. La Capella Ducale; Musica Fiata dir. Roland Wilson (conductor) rec. live, 26 October 2007 CPO 777369-2 [79:09]
- Sacred works, "Ich freue mich im Herrn" Monika Mauch, Barbara Bübl, Alex Potter, Hans Jörg Mammel, Markus Flaig, L'arpa festante, Rien Voskuilen. Carus-Verlag
