= Ospedali Grandi =

Venetian orphanages that developed into music conservatories

The four great Venetian Ospedali (Ospedali Grandi, also referred to as the Ospedali Maggiori) - the Ospedale della Pietà, the Ospedale degl'Incurabili, the Ospedale di Santa Maria dei Derelitti, and the Ospedale di San Lazzaro dei Mendicanti - were charitable hospices, which provided a wide range of services for the needy of Venice. They are most famously recognized for educating select female pupils (called figlie del coro) to professional levels of musicianship and attracting many European tourists to hear their all-female ensembles perform religious services and special concerts throughout the seventeenth and eighteenth centuries. The musical training in the Ospedali Grandi is often thought of as a precursor to the training in European conservatories of the 19th century.

== Historical background ==
Venice had a long history of caring for its sick, homeless, poor, and orphaned before the four Ospedali became recognized as a group of musical institutions. The Ospedale degl’Incurabili (1522), the Ospedale di Santa Maria dei Derelitti (1528), and the Ospedale di San Lazzaro e dei Mendicanti (1595) all emerged from hospices that had been formed in Venice in the previous centuries. Each catered to a different need: the Incurabili took in all who contracted incurable diseases such as syphilis or the bubonic plague; the Derelitti provided a place of refuge for the homeless; the Mendicanti cared for beggars and orphans; while the Pietà (1346), which was founded from an orphanage, exclusively took in foundlings.

The Ospedali's all-female musical ensembles - called cori - originated in the middle of the sixteenth century. The cori first performed music only for religious functions, and all music was taught either by current residents of the institutions who were already musically proficient or by hired church musicians (nuns or priests). During this time, the training in music was only meant to strengthen the liturgical services. Additionally, the figlie del coro were always required to perform in raised galleries, which had grating that hid the musicians from the eyes of the audience.

By mid-seventeenth century, however, the Ospedali governors realized the economic potential of the cori, and they began to hire many professional external musicians and composers to teach performance practice, sight singing, ear training, music theory, and instrumental techniques. The higher-quality musical training yielded larger donations from patrons and visitors. Many of the figlie del coro would stay at the Ospedali for their whole lives, passing their musical knowledge and experience to younger residents, creating a continuing tradition of musical excellence for women in Venice.

The Ospedali reached their pinnacle between 1720-80: the musical ensembles grew in number, and the governors hired even more instrumental teachers and composers. By the middle of the eighteenth century, the Ospedali Grandi had mostly moved away from having older figlie del coro teach beginning students. Instead, they adopted the master and pupil system of education: master teachers, who already held successful reputations, composed for the Ospedali and trained the figlie. Hiring the most famous composers became essential to attracting larger and wealthier audiences. A few special visitors also gained permission from the governors to view and listen to the women perform behind the grates.

Due to the financial instability in Venice at the end of the eighteenth century, however, the Ospedali fell into bankruptcy. The Derelitti closed in 1791, followed by the Medicanti in 1795. After Napoleon’s invasion of Venice in 1797, all musical activities at the Ospedali were reduced. The Incurabili closed in 1805, leaving only the Pietà’s musical activity to survive Napoleon’s government takeover. The Pietà’s last known musical composition was performed in 1840.

== Composers and Teachers ==
- Giovanni Rovetta (1596–1668)
- Giovanni Legrenzi (1626–1690)
- Carlo Grossi (1634–1688)
- Giovanni Domenico Partenio (before 1650–1701)
- Carlo Francesco Pollarolo (c. 1653–1723)
- Francesco Gasparini (1661–1727)
- Antonio Lotti (1667–1740)
- Giovanni Porta (c. 1675–1755)
- Antonio Vivaldi (1678–1741)
- Nicola Porpora (1686–1768)
- Johann Adolf Hasse (1699–1783)
- Andrea Bernasconi (1706–1784)
- Baldassare Galuppi (1706–1785)
- Gaetano Latilla (1711–1788)
- Niccolò Jommelli (1714–1774)
- Ferdinando Bertoni (1725–1813)
- Tommaso Traetta (1727–1779)
- Pasquale Anfossi (1727–1797)
- Bonaventura Furlanetto (1738–1817)
- Domenico Cimarosa (1749–1801)

== Sources ==
- Arnold, Denis. “Music at the Ospedali.” Journal of the Royal Musical Association 113, no. 2 (1988).
- Berdes, Jane L. Women Musicians of Venice: Musical Foundations 1525-1855. Oxford: Clarendon Press, 1993.
- Berdes, Jane L. and Joan Whittemore. Guide to Ospedali Research. New York: Pendragon Press, 2012.
- Gillio, Pier Giuseppe. L'Attività musicale negli Ospedali di Venezia nel Settecento. Florence: Olschki, 2006.
- Giron-Panel, Caroline. Musique et musiciennes à Venise : histoire sociale des ospedali. Rome: École française de Rome, 2015.
- Selfridge-Field, Eleanor. Venetian Instrumental Music from Gabrieli to Vivaldi. New York: Courier Dover Publications, 1994.
- Tonelli, Vanessa. "Le Figlie di Coro: Women's Musical Education and Performance at the Venetian Ospedali Maggiori, 1660-1740." PhD Dissertation. Northwestern University, 2022.
- Tonelli, Vanessa. "Women and Music in the Venetian Ospedali." Master's Thesis. Michigan State University, 2013.
