= Santa Pelagia =

Santa Pelagia is an Italian-language oratorio by Alessandro Stradella. The subject of the piece is Pelagia of Antioch, a courtesan in Asia Minor who repented and became a hermit on the Mount of Olives. Musical sources are thought to come from posthumous performances in Modena in 1688, six years after the death of the composer. 10 years after this another composer, Marc'Antonio Ziani, made the only other known oratorio on this subject.

== Cast ==
- Pelagia - soprano
- Nonno - bishop Nonnus, tenor, who tries to convince Pelagia to repent
- Religione - personification of religion, alto
- Mondo - personification of the world, bass
- Chorus

== Recording ==
The work was recorded by musicologist Andrea De Carlo and Ensemble Mare Nostrum in 2016.
