= Pampanini =

Pampanini is an Italian surname. Notable people with the surname include:

- Renato Pampanini (1875–1949), Italian botanist and mycologist
- Rosetta Pampanini (1896–1973), Italian soprano
- Silvana Pampanini (1925–2016), Italian actress, director, and singer

== See also ==
- Pampani
