= La divisione del mondo =

1675 Opera by Giovanni Legrenzi

- Opera by Giovanni Legrenzi
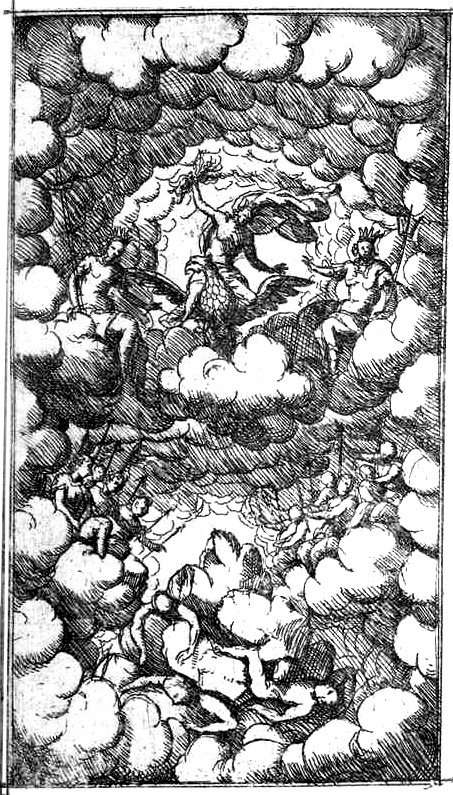
- Illustration from the 1675 libretto
- Librettist: Giulio Cesare Corradi
- Premiere: 4 February 1675; Teatro San Salvador, Venice

La divisione del mondo (The Division of the World) is an opera in 3 acts by composer Giovanni Legrenzi. The opera uses an Italian-language libretto by Giulio Cesare Corradi and was commissioned by the Marquis Guido Rangoni. The opera tells the story of the division of the world after the Titan deities were defeated by the Olympian gods. The goddess Venus provides the central conflict of the opera through a series of moral temptations which lead all of the other gods, with the exception of Saturn, into debauchery.

La divisione del mondo premiered on 4 February 1675 in Venice at the Teatro San Salvador. The opera was immensely successful at its premiere and became Lengrenzi's most widely performed work, with 13 productions in Italy between 1683 and 1699. Part of the work's success was due to the elaborate and expensive sets, machinery, and special effects employed at its premiere.

In 2000 La divisione del mondo had its first modern revival at the Schwetzingen Festival using a performance score prepared by musicologist Thomas Hengelbrock. The production was directed by Philippe Arlaud and starred Sonora Vaice as Venus, Kobie van Rensburg as Jupiter, Gabriele Sima as Juno, Simone Kermes as Cinzia, Matthias Rexroth in Apollo, Ilana Davidson as Cupid, Bernhard Landauer as Mercury, Hilary Summers as Mars, James Taylor as Neptune, Wolf Matthias Friedrich as Pluto, and Petteri Salomaa as Saturn. Hengelbrock conducted the Balthasar-Neumann-Ensemble.

The opera was revived in March 2019 at the Opéra national de Lorraine in Nancy to widespread acclaim.

== Roles ==
Roles, voice types, premiere cast
Role	Voice type	Premiere cast 4 February 1675
Giove (Jupiter), brother of Nettuno and Plutone	tenor	
Nettuno (Neptune), brother of Giove and Plutone	tenor	
Plutone (Pluto), brother of Giove and Nettuno	baritone	
Saturno (Saturn), father of Giove, Nettuno and Plutone	baritone	
Giunone (Juno), wife of Giove	mezzo-soprano	
Venere (Venus), mother of Amore	soprano	
Apollo, brother of Cinzia	contralto	Caterina Forti
Marte (Mars), son of Giove and Giunone	contralto	
Cinzia (Cynthia), sister of Apollo	soprano	
Amore (Cupid), son of Venere	soprano	
Mercurio (Mercury), son of Giove	contralto	
Discordia (Eris)	contralto	
