= San Gaetano, Vicenza =

Church building in Vicenza, Italy

Coordinates: 45.8791°N 11.6783°E

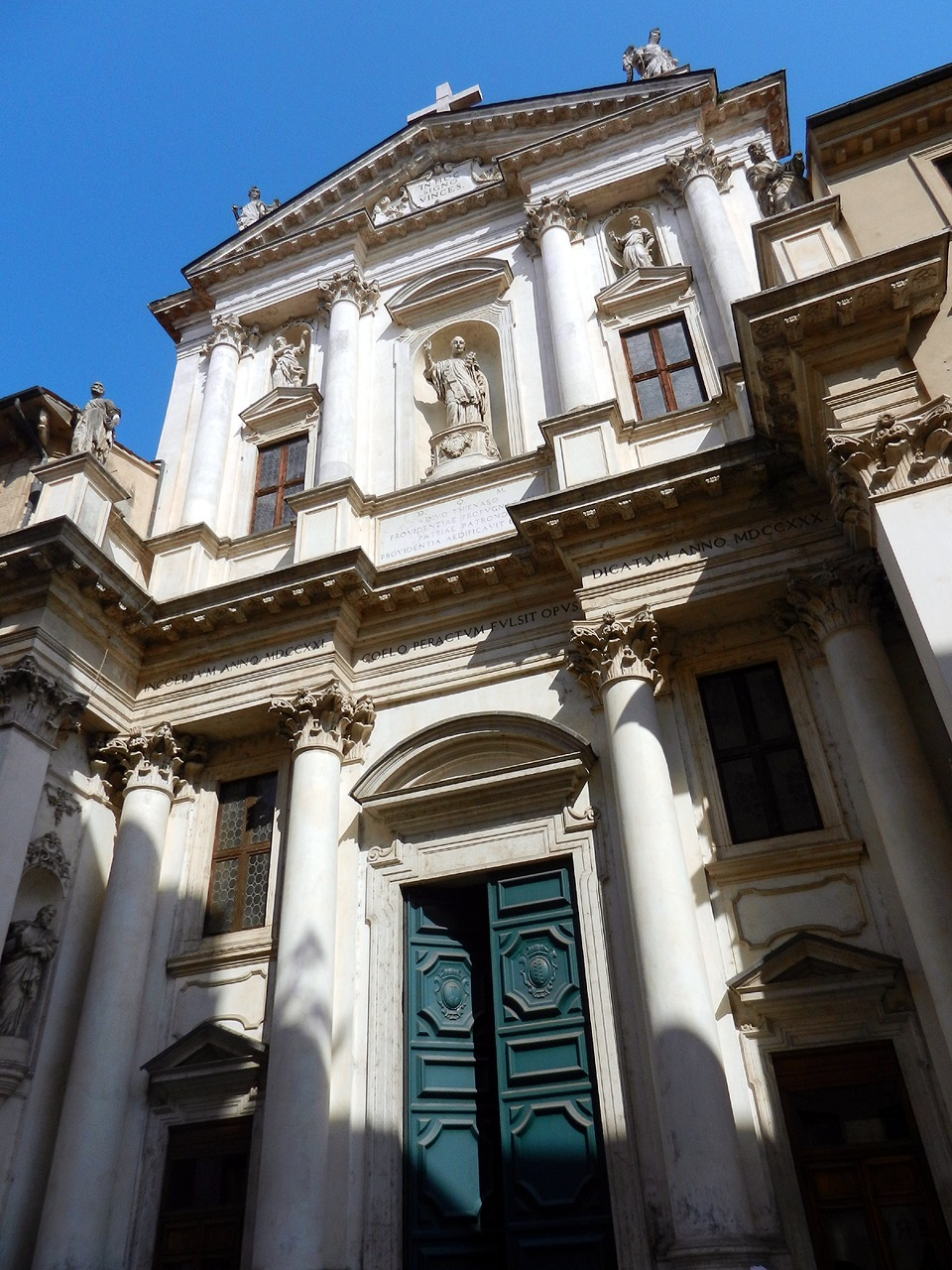
Church of San Gaetano, Vicenza

San Gaetano is a Roman Catholic church located on Corso Palladio #147 in the city of Vicenza, region of Veneto, Italy.

== History ==
The church was erected between 1721 and 1730 using designs of Girolamo Frigimelica Roberti and commissioned by the Theatine order. The church underwent reconstruction after bombardment during WWII in 1944. The church still houses a St Cajetan painted by Francesco Solimena.
