= Giuseppe Maria Orlandini =

Italian composer (1676–1760)

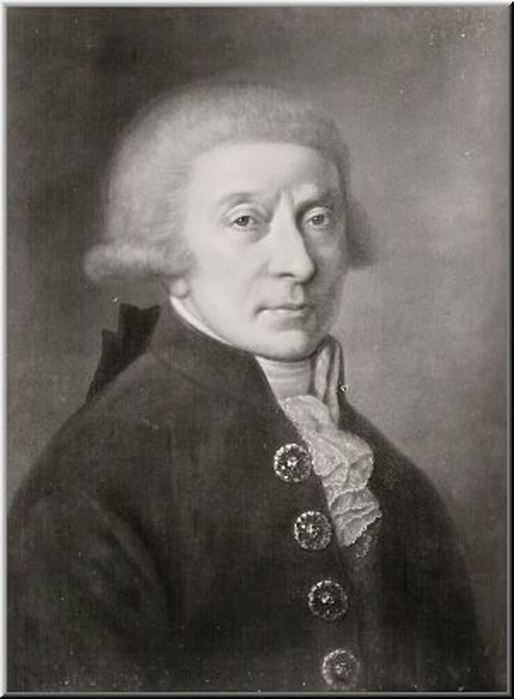
Giuseppe Maria Orlandini(1676–1760), Italian baroque composer

Giuseppe Maria Orlandini (4 April 1676 – 24 October 1760) was an Italian Baroque composer particularly known for his more than 40 operas and intermezzos. Highly regarded by music historians of his day like Francesco Saverio Quadrio, Jean-Benjamin de La Borde and Charles Burney, Orlandini, along with Vivaldi, is considered one of the major creators of the new style of opera that dominated the second decade of the 18th century.

== Life ==
Born in Florence, (Note: It was previously thought that he was born earlier on 19 March 1675 but current research has proven he was born on 4 April 1676. It is most likely that the earlier date is referring to an older brother who had died before Orlandini was born.) Orlandini began working as an opera composer in his late twenties for Prince Ferdinando de’ Medici. His first opera, Artaserse, premiered in Livorno in 1706. A moderate success, the work was revived in Naples in 1708. Beginning in 1711, he was the maestro di cappella to Prince Gian Gastone (later the Duke of Tuscany). In 1717, he moved to Bologna, where he met and married opera singer Maria Maddalena Buonavia. He continued to live and work in that city for the next fifteen years.

Orlandini's first major critical success was the opera Antigona which premiered in Venice during carnival of 1718. The work was highly popular and enjoyed performances throughout Europe. In 1719, he became a member of the Accademia Filarmonica. That same year his intermezzo Il marito giocatore (also performed under the title Serpilla e Bacocco in some later productions) premiered in Venice. The work became one of the most frequently performed musical dramas of the 18th century. Another successful intermezzo that was played in many opera houses in Europe was L'impresario delle Isole Canarie (Music lost).

The year 1721 saw two major successes for Orlandini. His opera Arsace, a revision of his 1715 Amore e maestà, premiered at the King’s Theatre in London to critical praise, and his opera Nerone premiered to great success for the carnival season in Venice. Both works became known throughout Europe.

Orlandini left Bologna to return to Florence in 1732, to become the maestro di cappella for the Medici court and the Basilica di Santa Maria del Fiore. While serving in these positions, he continued to remain productive as an opera composer, regularly providing works for the La Pergola and Il Cocomero theatres in Florence. His last stage work was the commedia per musica Lo scialacquatore, which premiered on 14 September 1744, at the Il Cocomero. He died in Florence.

== Works ==
=== Operas ===
- Artaserse (dramma per musica, libretto di Pietro Pariati e Apostolo Zeno, 1706, Livorno)
- L'amor generoso (dramma per musica, libretto di Apostolo Zeno, 2º Atto musica Rocco Ceruti, 1708, Firenze)
- L'odio e l'amore (dramma per musica, libretto di Matteo Noris, 1709, Genova)
- La fede tradita e vendicata (dramma per musica, libretto di Francesco Silvani, 1709, Genova)
- Ataulfo re de' Goti, ovvero La forza della virtù (dramma per musica, 1712, Roma)
- Teuzzone (dramma per musica, libretto di Apostolo Zeno, 1712, Ferrara)
- Madama Dulcinea e il cuoco del Marchese del Bosco (intermezzo, Marchese Trotti, 1712, Roma)
- L'innocenza difesa (dramma per musica, libretto di Francesco Silvani, 1712, Ferrara)
- L'amor tirannico (dramma per musica, libretto di Domenico Lalli, 1713, Roma)
- Lisetta e Delfo (intermezzo, 1713, Roma)
- Bacocco e Serpilla (intermezzo, 1715, Verona)
- Amore e maestà (tragedia per musica, libretto di Antonio Salvi, 1715, Firenze)
- La pastorella al soglio (dramma per musica, libretto di Giulio Cesare Corradi, 1717, Mantova)
- La virtù al cimento (dramma per musica, libretto di Apostolo Zeno, 1717, Mantova)
- La Merope (dramma per musica, libretto di Apostolo Zeno, 1717, Bologna)
- Lucio Papirio (dramma per musica, libretto di Antonio Salvi, 1717, Napoli)
- Antigona (tragedia, libretto di Benedetto Pasqualigo, 1718, Venezia)
- Le amazoni vinte da Ercole (dramma per musica, libretto di Antonio Salvi? o Giovanni Francesco Bussani, 1718, Reggio Emilia)
- Ifigenia in Tauride (tragedia, libretto di Benedetto Pasqualigo, dopo Pier Jacopo Martello, 1719, Venezia)
- Il carceriero di se stesso (dramma per musica, libretto di Antonio Salvi, 1719, Teatro Carignano di Torino con Francesca Cuzzoni)
- Paride (dramma per musica, libretto di Francesco Muazzo, 1720, Venezia)
- Melinda e Tiburzio (intermezzo, 1721, Venezia)
- Nerone (tragedia per musica, libretto di Agostino Piovene, 1721, Venezia)
- Nino (dramma per musica, libretto di Ippolito Zanella, 1722, Roma)
- Ormisda (dramma per musica, libretto di Apostolo Zeno, 1722, Bologna)
- L'artigiano gentiluomo (Larinda e Vanesio) (intermezzo, libretto di Antonio Salvi, basato su Le bourgeois gentilhomme di Molière, 1722, Firenze)
- Alessandro Severo (dramma per musica, libretto di Apostolo Zeno, 1723, Milano)
- L'Oronta (dramma per musica, libretto di Claudio Nicola Stampa, 1724, Milano)
- Berenice (dramma per musica, libretto di Benedetto Pasqualigo, dopo Jean Racine, 1725, Venezia)
- Il malato immaginario (Erighetta e Don Chilone) (intermezzo, libretto di Antonio Salvi, basato su Le malade imaginaire di Molière, 1725, Firenze)
- Un vecchio innamorato (intermezzo, libretto di D. Marchi, 1725, Firenze)
- Monsieur di Porsugnacchi (Grilletta e Porsugnacco) (intermezzo, basato su Monsieur de Pourceaugnac di Molière, 1727, Milano)
- Berenice (dramma per musica, basato su Farnace di Antonio Maria Lucchini, 1728, Milano)
- Adelaide (dramma per musica, libretto di Antonio Salvi, 1729, Venezia)
- L'impresario dell'isole Canarie (Dorina e Nibbio) (intermezzo, libretto di Pietro Metastasio, 1729, Venezia)
- Massimiano (dramma per musica, libretto di Carlo Goldoni, basato su Costantino di Pietro Pariati e Apostolo Zeno, 1731, Venezia)
- Grollo e Moschetta (intermezzo, 1732, Venezia)
- Ifigenia in Aulide (dramma per musica, libretto di Apostolo Zeno, 1732, Firenze)
- Il marito geloso (Giletta e Ombrone) (intermezzo, 1732, Venezia)
- Il Temistocle (dramma per musica, libretto di Pietro Metastasio, 1737, Firenze)
- L'Olimpiade (dramma per musica, libretto di Pietro Metastasio, 1737, Firenze)
- Le nozze di Perseo e Andromeda (azione drammatica, libretto by Antonio Marchi, 1738, Florence)
- Balbo e Dalisa (intermezzo, libretto di Antonio Salvi, 1740, Roma)
- La Fiammetta (commedia per musica, 1743, Firenze)
- Lo scialacquatore (commedia per musica, 1744, Firenze)

==== Doubtful works ====
- Didone abbandonata (dramma per musica, libretto di Pietro Metastasio, 1725, Firenze)
- Arianna e Teseo (dramma per musica, libretto di Pietro Pariati, 1739, Firenze)
- Venceslao (dramma per musica, libretto di Apostolo Zeno, 1741, Firenze)
- Vologeso re de' Parti (dramma per musica, libretto di Apostolo Zeno, 1742, Firenze)

=== Oratorios ===
- Il martirio di San Sebastiano (libretto di A. Ghivizzani, 1694, Firenze)
- I fanciulli babilonesi (1696, Firenze)
- La costanza trionfane nel martirio di Santa Lucia (libretto di B. Colzi, 1705, Firenze)
- Sara in Egitto (libretto di D. Cavanese, 1708, Firenze)
- Il figliuol prodigo (libretto di B. Pamphili, 1709, Siena)
- Gli amori infelici di Ammone (libretto di Berzini, 1711, Firenze)
- L'Assalone ovvero L'infedeltà punita (1713, Firenze)
- Dal trionfo le perdite ovvero Jefte che sagrifica la sua figlia (libretto di D. Cavanese, 1716, Firenze)
- Componimento per musica da cantarsi la notte del Santissimo Natale (libretto di G. B. Pontici, 1721, Roma)
- L'Ester (libretto di G. Melani, 1723, Bologna)
- Giuditta (1726, Castel San Pietro)
- Jaele (libretto di D. Marchi, 1735, Firenze)
- Assuero (1738, Firenze)
- Davidde trionfante (G. M. Medici, 1738, Firenze)
- Il Gioas re di Giuda (libretto di Pietro Metastasio, 1744, Firenze)
- Giuseppe riconosciuto (libretto di Pietro Metastasio, 1745, Firenze)
- Tobia (libretto di Apostolo Zeno, 1749, Firenze)
- Componimento da cantarsi nel venerabile monastero di Santa Apollonia in Firenze (libretto di F. Casorri, 1750, Firenze)
- Isacco figura del redentore (libretto di Pietro Metastasio, 1752, Firenze)
- La deposizione dalla croce di Gesù Cristo Signor Nostro (libretto di G. C. Pasquini, 1760, Firenze)

=== Other compositions ===
- La ricreazione spirituale nella musica (canzonetta spirituale, 1730, Bologna)
- 3 canzonette (1739–40, Firenze)
- 22 sonate a tre
- Sinfonia per clavicembalo
