= Giulio Cesare Corradi =

Italian opera librettist

Giulio Cesare Corradi (Parma, c.1650 - Venice, 1701 or 1702) was an Italian opera librettist.

No biographical information exists prior to 1674 and the appearance of his first work.

== Libretti ==
- La schiava fortunata (1674), set by Ziani
- La divisione del mondo (1675), set by Legrenzi at the Teatro San Salvador.
- Germanico sul Reno (1676), set by Legrenzi
- Creso (1681), set by Legrenzi
- I due Cesari (1683), set by Legrenzi
- Il gran Tamerlano (1689), set by Ziani - reworked by Christian Heinrich Postel for Johann Philipp Förtsch at the Oper am Gänsemarkt 1690.
- Domizio (1696), set by Ziani
- Primislao primo re di Boemia (1697), set by Albinoni
- Tigrane re d'Armenia (1697), set by Albinoni
- Egisto re di Cipro (1698), set by Ziani
- La pastorella al soglio (opera postuma Oct. 1702) set by various composers, at Teatro San Cassiano
