= Gabriele Sima =

Austrian opera singer (1955–2016)

- Born: 25 February 1955; Innsbruck, Austria
- Died: 27 April 2016 (aged 61); Vienna, Austria
- Education: Mozarteum University Salzburg
- Years active: 1979－2016

Gabriele Sima (25 February 1955 – 27 April 2016) was an Austrian opera singer who had an active international performance career since 1979. Particularly known for her appearances at the Salzburg Festival, the Vienna State Opera, and the Zurich Opera, she has performed in roles associated with both the soprano and mezzo-soprano repertoires.

== Life and career ==
Born in Innsbruck and raised in Salzburg, Sima was trained at the Mozarteum University Salzburg and the Academy of Music in Vienna. In 1979 she made her professional opera debut with Spectaculum, a Vienna-based opera company dedicated to performing baroque operas. From 1979 to 1982 she was a member of the young artist program at the Vienna State Opera (VSO). She was then promoted to the role of resident artist with the VSO, a position she maintained until 1988 when she became a principal artist at the Zurich Opera.

She made her debut at the Salzburg Festival in 1980 in Ernst Krenek's Karl V, and continued to perform there regularly over the next decade. Her roles at Salzburg included Johanna in the world premiere of Friedrich Cerha's Baal (8 July 1981) and the Nurse in the world premiere of Luciano Berio's Un re in ascolto (7 July 1984). She appeared at Salzburg in performances of Othmar Schoeck's Penthesilea (1982), Gottfried von Einem's Dantons Tod (1983), a concert of works by Wolfgang Amadeus Mozart in 1987, and Richard Strauss's Elektra (1989).

In 1991 Sima made her debut at the Deutsche Oper am Rhein as Cherubino in The Marriage of Figaro, a role which she also sang for her debut at the Teatro Comunale in Ferrara in 1994. She returned to the VSO several times during the 1990s, including appearances as Annio in La clemenza di Tito (1991), Octavian in Der Rosenkavalier (1991), and Nicklausse in The Tales of Hoffmann (1995). She performed in multiple productions as the Hamburg State Opera during her career. In 2000 she performed the role of Juno in the first modern revival of Giovanni Legrenzi's La divisione del mondo at the Schwetzingen Festival.

Other roles Sima has performed on stage include Barbarina in The Marriage of Figaro, Berta in The Barber of Seville, Esmeralda in The Bartered Bride, The Fortuneteller in Arabella, Flora in La traviata, Giannetta in The Elixir of Love, Papagena in The Magic Flute, the Shepherd Boy in Tannhäuser, Siébel in Faust, and Xenia in Boris Godunov among others.

== Death ==
Sima died in Vienna on 27 April 2016, aged 61, from undisclosed causes.
