= Domenico Freschi =

Italian composer

Giovanni Domenico Freschi (26 March 1634 – 2 July 1710) was an Italian composer and Roman Catholic priest. From the age of 22 until his death he worked as a church musician and composer in Vincenza. He was also active as an opera composer from 1671 to 1685.

== Life and career ==
Born in Bassano del Grappa, Freschi was appointed the maestro di cappella at the Cathedral of Vicenza on 14 December 1656; just a few years after his ordination. He remained in that post until his death in Vincenza 53 and a half years later. His sacred music compositions were frequently performed at the cathedral and at other major churches in Vincenza during his lifetime.

In addition to his work as a church musician and composer, Freschi also had an active career as an opera composer. Of his 16 known operas, 11 of them premiered at theatres in Venice and 5 of them at the opera house in Villa Contarini, Piazzola sul Brenta. His first opera, Ifide greca (libretto by Nicolò Minato), premiered in Venice in 1671. His second opera, Helena rapita da Paride was performed for the inauguration of the Teatro Sant'Angelo in Venice in 1677. His last opera to premiere, Gl'amori d'Alidaura, was performed in Piazzola sul Brenta in 1685.

== Operas ==
- Ifide greca (dramma per musica, libretto by Nicolò Minato, 1671, Venice)
- Helena rapita da Paride (dramma per musica, libretto by Aurelio Aureli, 1677, Venice)
- Tullia superba (dramma per musica, libretto by Antonio Medolago, 1678, Venice)
- La Circe (dramma per musica, libretto by Cristoforo Ivanovich, 1679, Venezia)
- Sardanapalo (dramma per musica, libretto by Carlo Maderni, 1679, Venice)
- Berenice vendicata (dramma per musica, libretto by Giorgio Maria Rapparini, 1680, Piazzola sul Brenta)
- Il cittadino amante della patria ovvero Il Tello (operetta, libretto by Giorgio Maria Rapparini, 1680, Piazzola sul Brenta)
- Pompeo Magno in Cilicia (dramma per musica, libretto by Aurelio Aureli, 1681, Venice)
- Olimpia vendicata (dramma per musica, libretto by Aurelio Aureli, 1681, Venice)
- Giulio Cesare trionfante (dramma per musica, libretto by Luigi Orlandi, 1682, Venice)
- Ermelinda (dramma per musica, libretto by Francesco Maria Piccioli, 1682, Piazzola sul Brenta)
- Silla (dramma per musica, libretto by Andrea Rossini, 1683, Venice)
- L'incoronazione di Dario (dramma per musica, libretto by Adriano Morselli, 1684, Venice)
- Teseo tra le rivali (dramma per musica, libretto by Aurelio Aureli, 1685, Venice)
- Gl'amori d'Alidaura (dramma per musica, libretto by Francesco Maria Piccioli, 1685, Piazzola sul Brenta)
- L'amante muto loquace (dramma per musica, libretto by Nicolò Leonardi, Piazzola sul Brenta)

== Sources ==
- T. Walker and B.L. Glixon: "Domenico Freschi", The New Grove Dictionary of Music and Musicians
