= Antonio Gianettini =

Italian composer (1648–1721)

Antonio Gianettini, also known as Giovanni Antonio Gianettini, (also Giannettini, Zanettini, Zannettini; 1648 – 14 July 1721) was an Italian organist, concertmaster and composer.

== Biography ==
Antonio Gianettini was born in Fano in 1648. Almost nothing is known about his early musical training. By 1662, he was living in Venice with the composer and priest Sebastiano Enno who was likely one of his music teachers in that city. On 14 January 1674, he was admitted as a bass singer in the choir of the chapel of St Mark's Basilica. It is possible that he sang earlier with this choir in 1672.

Subsequently, on 5 December 1676, he was appointed as an organist at the Basilica of Santi Giovanni e Paolo with a salary of 40 ducats a year (a position he held until 1679). In this period, he studied music with Carlo Grossi and perhaps also with Giovanni Legrenzi. On 25 January 1677, he was also an organist at San Marco (while being a choir singer). From 1676, he started to be active as a composer: in this period, he wrote about ten works in Venice and Milan and various sacred music (including some motets for Ippolito Bentivoglio). During years 1685-1686, he was also active as a composer and a capella teacher for the Duke of Hannover Ernest Augustus of Brunswick-Lüneburg. While there, he stayed in a building overlooking the Grand Canal.

On May 1, 1686, Gianettini left his offices at San Marco to take the place of maestro di cappella at the court of Francesco II, Duke of Modena. His salary for his services to the court of Modena was 396 lire a month (a considerable amount for the time). For the Duke's court he wrote 9 oratorios, but also other sacred compositions, cantatas and serenades. With the outbreak of the Spanish succession war, Modena was occupied by the French and in 1702, he had to flee with Duke Rinaldo I (successor of Francesco II) to Bologna. After the war, in 1707, he returned to Modena, where he continued his work as the director of the chapel, but without receiving the high salary like years before. In 1710, he was part of the teaching faculty for the virtuosos of Modena, giving lessons to singers such as the Tenor Francesco Maria Cignoni. In May 1721, he decided to accompany her daughter Maria Caterina to Munich, a city where she was active as a singer at the Bavarian court and where he died shortly after on 14 July 1721.

Although rarely known now, Gianettini was considered as one of the most talented composers of his era. He was very much appreciated as an opera and composer of sacred music both in Italy and in Germany.

== Works ==
Gianettini created oratorios, of which La morte di Cristo is the best known, as well as about 20 stage works, cantatas, masses and other sacred music.

Oratorios

- Amore alle catene, oratorio di S Antonio; Modena, 1687
- Jefte; Text, Giovanni Battista Neri; Modena, 1687; Music lost
- L’uomo in bivio; Modena, 1687
- La creatione de’ magistrati; Modena, 1688
- La conversione della beata Margherita di Cortona; Modena, 1689; Music lost
- Il martirio di S Giustina; Modena, 1689; Music lost
- La vittima d’amore ossia La morte di Cristo; Modena, 1690
- Dio sul Sinai; Modena, 1691; Music lost
- Le finezze della divina grazia nella conversione di S Agostino; Modena, 1697; Music lost

Stage works

- Medea in Atene; Libretto: Aurelio Aureli; Venice, December 14, 1675
- L’Aurora in Atene; Libretto: G. Frisari; Venice, S. S. Giovanni e Paolo, 1678
- Echo ravvivata; festive music, 3 acts; Venice, 1681
- Irene e Costantino; Venice, San Salvatore, 1681
- Temistocle in bando; Libretto: Antonio Morselli; Venice, San Cassiano, December 4, 1682
- L’Ermione riacquistata; Libretto: F. Pazzaglia; Venice, Palace of the Prince Alessandro Farnese, March 29, 1683; Music lost
- Il giuditio di Paride; trattenimento da camera, 1 act; Venice, June 1685
- La Fedeltà consolata dalla Speranza; Libretto: Nicolò Beregan, Serenata; Venice, August 1685
- Amor sincero; Libretto: N. Beregan, Serenade; Venice, July 1686
- L’ingresso alla gioventù di Claudio Nerone; Libretto: G.B. Neri; Modena, Fontanelli, November 4, 1692
- Introduzione alla festa d’armi e balli; Libretto: E. Pinamonte Bonacossi; Modena, 1699; Music lost
- Tito Manlio; Libretto: Matteo Noris, comedies; Reggio Emilia, 1701
- Virginio consolo; Libretto: M. Noris; Venice, San Angelo, 1704; Music lost
- Artaserse; Libretto: Apostolo Zeno and Pietro Pariati; Venice, San Angelo, 1705;
- I presagi di Melissa; Libretto: F. Torti, introduction to a dance party; Modena, 1709; Music lost
- Publio Scipione, ossia Il riparatore delle glorie romane; accademico tributo; Modena, July 1710; Music lost
- L’unione delle tre dee Pallade, Giunone e Venere; Libretto, G.M. Tommasi, Serenade; Modena, 1716; Music lost
- La gara di Minerva e Marte; Modena, 1716; Music lost
- Il Panaro in giubilo; Libretto: G.M. Tommasi, Serenade; Modena, 1717; Music lost

== Selected recordings ==
Antonio Giannettini: l'Uomo in Bivio - Oratorio, Modena 1687 Cantar Lontano, Marco Mencoboni 2CD 2021 GCD923524 Glossa
