= Scanderbeg (Vivaldi) =

Opera by Antonio Vivaldi

Skanderbeg
- Dramma per musica by Antonio Vivaldi
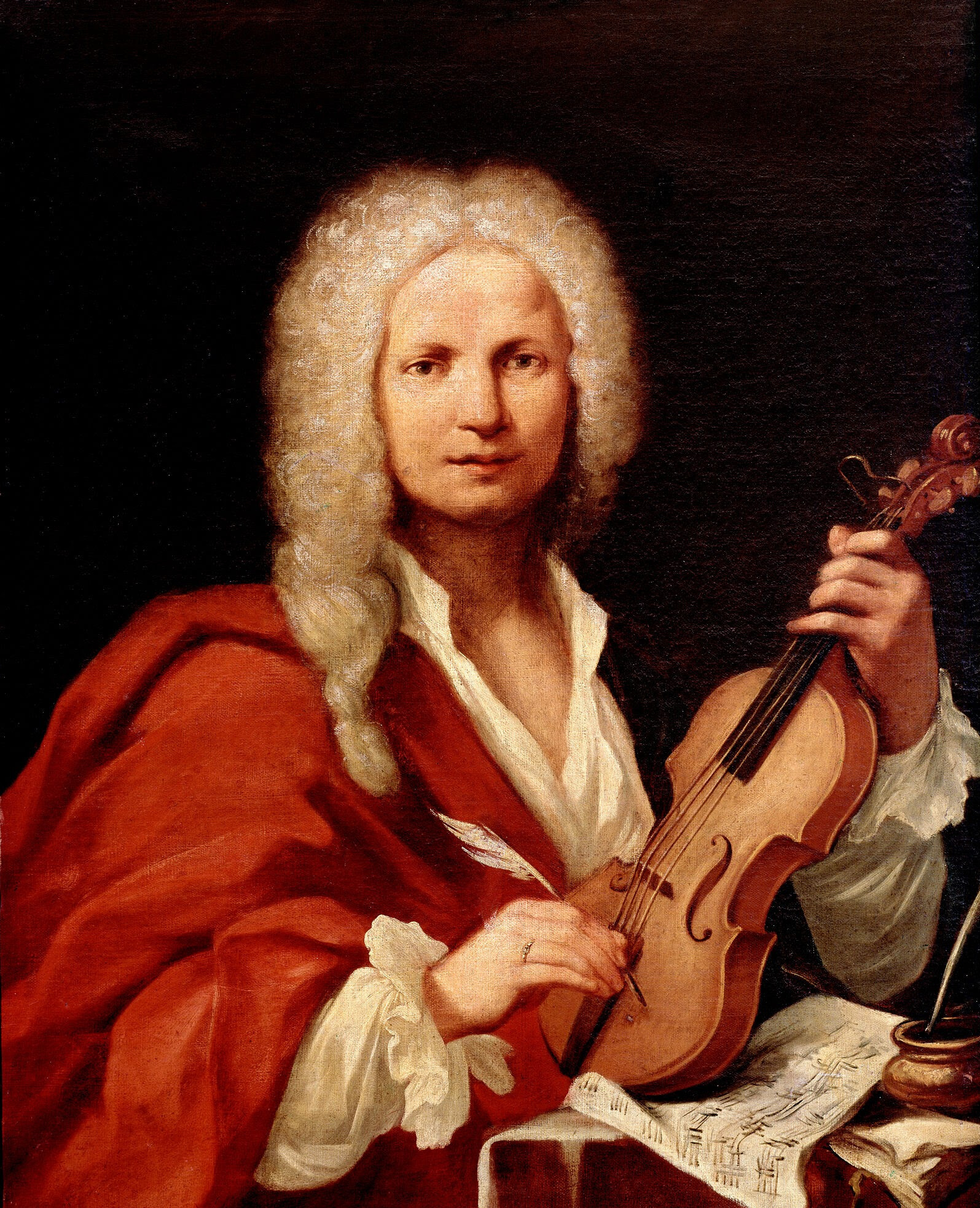
- Putative portrait of Antonio Vivaldi, c. 1723
- Librettist: Antonio Salvi
- Language: Italian
- Premiere: 23 June 1718; Teatro della Pergola, Florence

Scanderbeg (Italian pronunciation: [ˈskanderbeɡ]; RV 732) is an opera (dramma per musica) in three acts composed by Antonio Vivaldi to an Italian libretto by Antonio Salvi. It was first performed at the Teatro della Pergola in Florence on 22 June 1718 to mark the re-opening of the theatre to public performances. While the libretto has been preserved, only fragments of the original score remain.

== Synopsis ==
The subject of the opera is Skanderbeg, who is presented as the king of Albania, but also as an ethnic Greek.

== Roles ==
Roles, voice types, premiere cast
Role	Voice type	Premiere cast, 22 June 1718
Scanderbeg, King of Albania	contralto castrato	Giovanni Battista Carboni
Doneca, his wife, disguised as a shepherdess	soprano	Francesca Cuzzoni-Sandoni, 'La Parmigiana'
Aroniz, Price of Epirus, father of Doneca, disguised as a shepherd	tenor	Antonio Ristorini
Ormondo, Count of Urana, army general	contralto castrato	Giovanni Pietro Sbaraglia, "Il Pesciatino"
Climene, Scanderbeg's captain	soprano (travesti)	Anna Guglielmini
Amurat II, monarch of the Turks	tenor	Gaetano Mossi
Asteria, his daughter	contralto	Agata Landi
Acomat, Amurat's general, in love with Asteria	soprano (travesti)	Rosa Venturini

== Recordings ==
Two arias from the opera's second act, "S'a voi penso, o luci belle" (Ormondo) and "Con palme ed allori" (Scanderbeg), can be heard on Arie ritrovate sung by contralto Sonia Prina with the Accademia Bizantina, conducted by Ottavio Dantone (Naïve Records).
