= Carlo Pallavicino (composer) =

Italian composer (c. 1630–1688)

Carlo Pallavicino (Pallavicini; c. 1630 – 29 January 1688) was an Italian composer.

Pallavicino was born at Salò. From 1666 to 1673, he worked at the Dresden court; from 1674 to 1685, at the Ospedale degli Incurabili (a conservatory where orphaned children were musically trained) in Venice and further in Dresden. In August and September 1687, he was with the concert master Georg Gottfried Backstroh back in Venice. He asked for renewal of his leave because his wife expected to give birth, but he was rejected. He died in Dresden, and his grave is located in the Convent of the St. Mariestern.

He wrote more than 20 operas premiered in Venice and Dresden, oratorios and sacred works. His son, Dresden court writer Stefano Benedetto Pallavicino, was a known librettist.

== Works ==
=== Operas ===
- Demetrio (dramma per musica, libretto by Giacomo dall'Angelo, 1666, Venice)
- Aureliano (dramma per musica con prologo, libretto by Giacomo dall'Angelo, 1666, Venice)
- Il tiranno humiliato d'amore, ovvero Il Meraspe (dramma per musica con prologo, libretto by Giovanni Faustini, revised by Nicolò Beregan, 1667, Venice)
- Diocleziano (dramma per musica, libretto by Matteo Noris, 1674, Venice)
- Enea in Italia (dramma per musica, libretto by Giacomo Francesco Bussani, 1675, Venice)
- Galieno (dramma per musica, libretto by Matteo Noris, 1675, Venice)
- Vespasiano (dramma per musica, libretto by Giulio Cesare Corradi, 1678, Venice; opera for the inauguration of the Teatro San Giovanni Grisostomo)
- Nerone (dramma per musica, libretto by Giulio Cesare Corradi, 1679, Venice)
- Le amazoni nell'isole fortunate (dramma per musica con prologo, libretto by Francesco Maria Piccioli, 1679, at Villa Contarini, Piazzola sul Brenta; opera for the inauguration of the private theatre of the Procurator Marco Contarini)
- Messalina (dramma per musica, libretto by Francesco Maria Piccioli, 1679, Venice)
- Bassiano, ovvero Il maggior impossibile (dramma per musica, libretto by Matteo Noris, 1682, Venice)
- Carlo re d'Italia (dramma per musica, libretto by Matteo Noris, 1683, Venice)
- Il re infante (dramma per musica, libretto by Matteo Noris, 1683, Venice)
- Licinio imperatore (dramma per musica, libretto by Matteo Noris, 1683, Venice)
- Ricimero re de' vandali (dramma per musica, libretto by Matteo Noris, 1684, Venice)
- Massimo Puppieno (dramma per musica, libretto by Aurelio Aureli, 1685, Venice)
- Penelope la casta (dramma per musica, libretto by Matteo Noris, 1685, Venice)
- Amore inamorato (dramma per musica, libretto by Matteo Noris, 1686, Venice)
- Didone delirante (dramma per musica, libretto by Antonio Franceschi, 1686, Venice)
- L'amazone corsara, ovvero L'Avilda regina de' Goti (dramma per musica, libretto by Giulio Cesare Corradi, 1686, Venice)
