= Antonio Pollarolo =

Baroque Italian composer

Antonio Giovanni Pollarolo (baptized, 12 November 1676 — died, 30 May 1746) was an Italian composer of the Baroque period, keyboardist, and maestro di cappella at St Mark's Basilica in Venice. As a composer he is primarily remembered for his operas, although his composition output also included cantatas, oratorios, and motets. A precursor to 19th century bel canto opera composers like Gioachino Rossini and Gaetano Donizetti, his vocal writing was written in a virtuosic manner characterized by florid coloratura passages, wide vocal range, lively tempos, and syncopated rhythms.

== Life and career ==
Antonio Pollarolo was born in Brescia in 1676 and was baptized on 12 November of that year. His father was the opera composer and organist Carlo Francesco Pollarolo. He was trained as a musician by his father, and possibly by Antonio Lotti. At the age of 13 he moved with his family to Venice when his father was appointed vicemaestro di cappella at St Mark's Basilica. Antonio occasionally substituted for his father in this position, beginning in 1702, and later succeeded his father in the post in 1723. He later succeeded Lotti in the higher position of primo maestro at that cathedral in 1740; a post he held until his death six years later. He concurrently served as maestro di Coro at the Venice Conservatory while working at St Mark's Basilica; a post he was first elected to in 1716.

Pollarolo's first opera, L’Aristeo, was staged in Venice at the Teatro San Cassiano in 1700. This was followed by the operas Griselda (1701) and Demetrio e Tolomeo (1702). After this came a period devoted mainly to sacred music, and his next opera, Nerone fatto Cesare, was not staged until 1715. His other operas include Nerone fatto Cesare (1715, Venice), Leucippe e Teonoe (1719, Teatro San Giovanni Grisostomo), La figlia che canta (1720, Teatro San Fantin), Plautilla (1721, Teatro San Giovanni Grisostom), Venceslao (Venice, 1721), Cosröe (1723, Rome), I tre voti (1724, Vienna), Turia Lucrezia (1726, Teatro San Angelo), Nerina (1728, Teatro San Samuele), and Sulpizia fedele (1729, Teatro San Samuele).

Pollarolo was married twice. He had three children with his first wife who died in 1709. He married a second time in 1712, and had four more children from this second relationship. He died in Venice in 1746.
