= Ospedale degli Incurabili, Venice =

Hospital in Venice, Italy

Ospedale degli Incurabili
- Ospedale degli incurabili
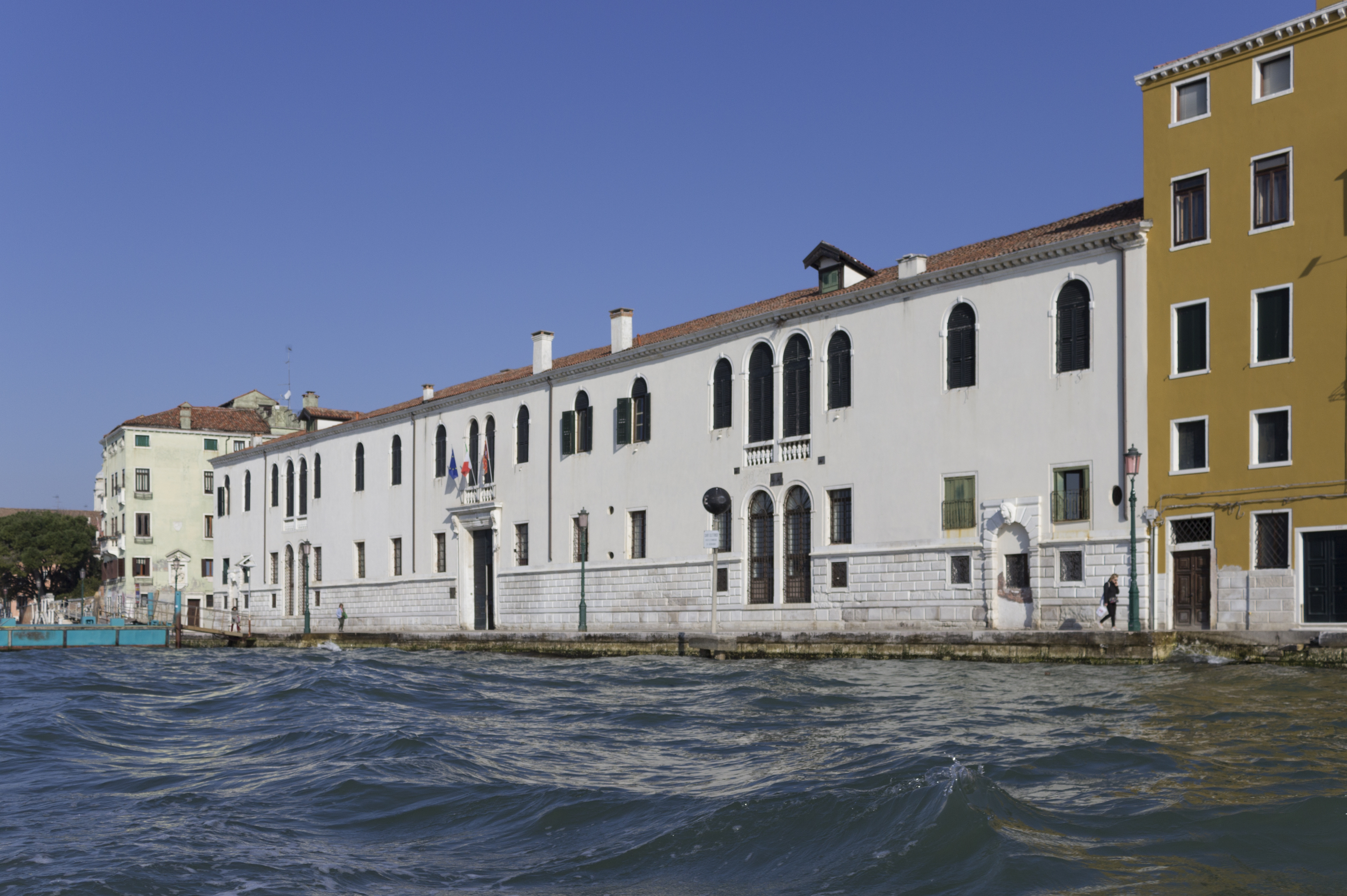
- The former hospital in 2017

General information
- Location: Fondamenta delle Zattere, Venice, Italy
- Coordinates: 45.4286°N 12.3305°E
- Current tenants: Accademia di Belle Arti di Venezia

Design and construction
- Architect: Jacopo Sansovino

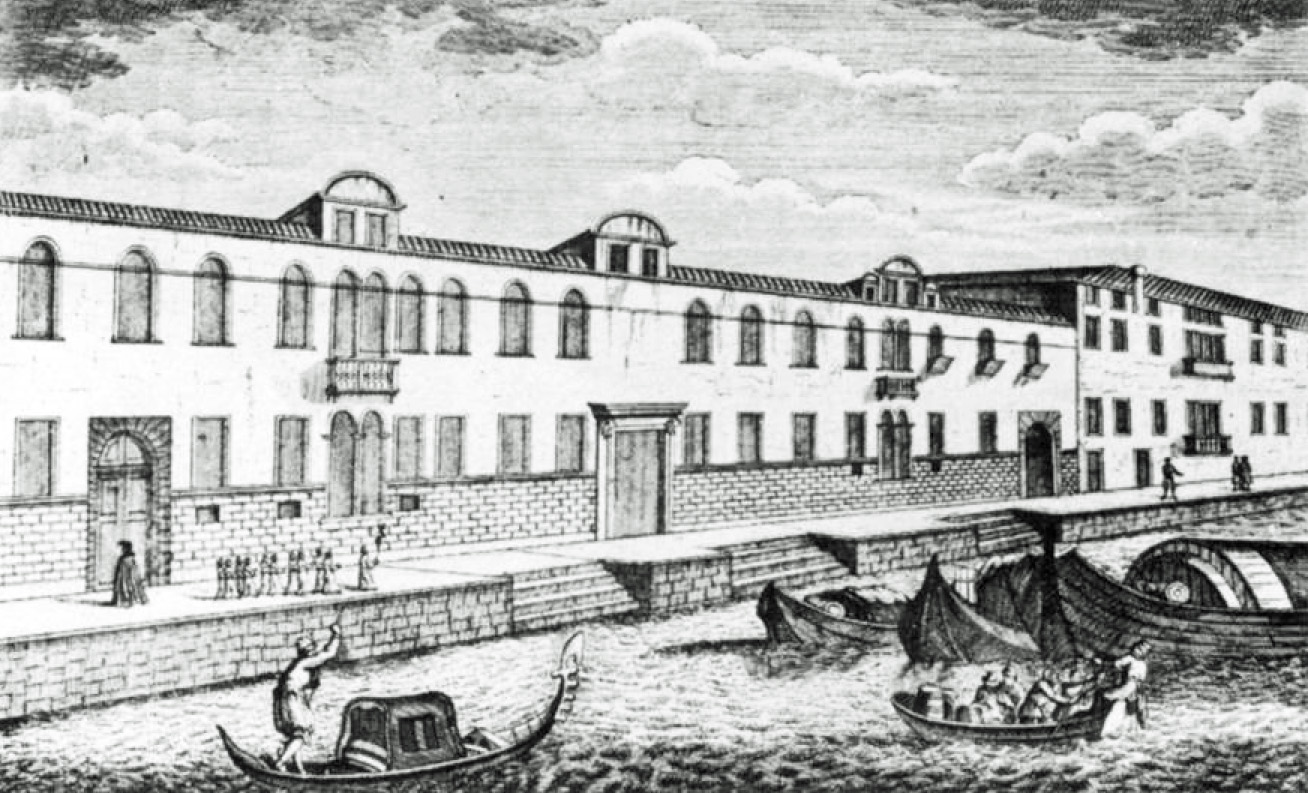
Eighteenth-century engraving of the Ospedali degli Incurabili

The Ospedale degli Incurabili is a large sixteenth-century hospital building on the Fondamenta delle Zattere, in the sestiere of Dorsoduro, in Venice in north-eastern Italy. Today it is occupied by the Accademia di Belle Arti di Venezia. It was built in the second half of the sixteenth century; the church – which no longer exists – may have been designed by Jacopo Sansovino.

== History ==
The Ospedale degli Incurabili dates from the early sixteenth century; the first documented mention of it is from 1522. It was established by Gaetano da Thiene with money donated by two noblewomen, Maria Grimani and Maria Malipiero. It was at first intended to accommodate those with incurable diseases such as syphilis, but later – like several other Venetian institutions – became an orphanage. The first structure was probably of wood.

From about 1565 – when a request for funds was made to the Senate – until his death in 1597, Antonio da Ponte was responsible for the construction of a substantial building with a large porticoed courtyard, in which stood a church dedicated to San Salvatore, probably built to a design by Jacopo Sansovino. It has been suggested that he was also responsible for the layout of the hospital building, which others attribute to Antonio Zentani.

In 1807, after the suppression of religious orders which followed the fall of the Republic of Venice and its subsequent fall under the dominion of Napoleon, the structure of the Incurabili became first a civil hospital and then, in 1819, a military barracks. The church of San Salvatore was stripped of its contents – which included the altars, marble statuary, and paintings by L'Aliense, Giorgione, Sante Peranda, Tintoretto and Paolo Veronese – and was closed; in 1831 it was demolished.

Among those associated with the work of the Incurabili in its early years are Ignazio da Loyola, Gerolamo Miani and Francesco Saverio.

== Music ==
As in the other three Ospedali Grandi – the Derelitti or Ospedaletto, the Mendicanti, and the Pietà – the young women of the Incurabili received extensive musical education, and gave musical performances which by the eighteenth century had acquired international renown; among those who gave accounts of such performances were Charles Burney, Goethe, Johann Joachim Quantz and Jean-Jacques Rousseau. The first documented oratorio performance at the Incurabili was in 1677, of the San Francesco Xaverio of Carlo Pallavicino, who was maestro di coro there from 1674 until 1685. From 1696 until at least 1718 – and perhaps until 1722 – the musical director was Carlo Francesco Pollarolo. The Hamburg composer Johann Adolph Hasse had associations with the Incurabili for some fifty years, and was maestro di cappella there from no later than 1736. After his departure for Dresden, he recommended that the post be given to Niccolò Jommelli, who was appointed in 1743.

Vincenzo Legrenzio Ciampi worked at the Ospedale from 1747 until his death in 1762, initially as assistant maestro di coro under Giovanni Battista Runcher, and then as maestro. He was able to obtain permission to spend long periods abroad, and was in London for much of this time; Gioacchino Cocchi took his place during his absences.
