= Palazzo Pisani a San Stefano =

Building in Venice, Italy

Coordinates: 45°26′10″N 12°19′46″E

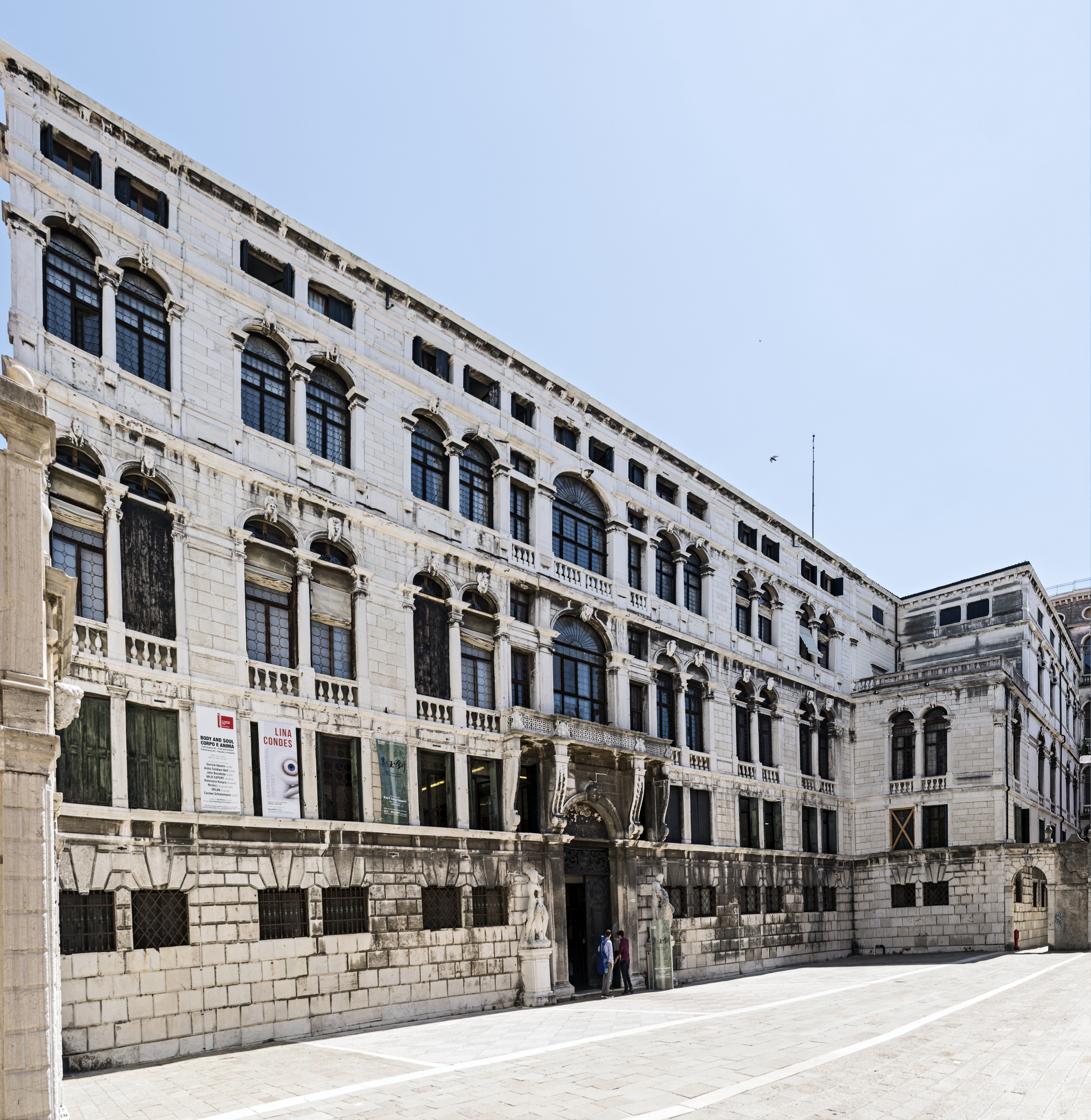
Palazzo Pisani a San Stefano

The Palazzo Pisani a Santo Stefano is a large palace located facing Campo Santo Stefano, in an alley near the facade of the church of San Vidal, in the sestiere of San Marco, in the city of Venice, Italy. The palace is owned by the city and now houses the Conservatorio di Musica Benedetto Marcello di Venezia, founded in 1876.

== History ==
The prominent Pisani family decided to move to this site from elsewhere in Venice. While the initial design of the present layout of the palace is attributed to Jacopo Sansovino, the palace was erected in 1614-15, decades after Sansovino's death. The project was commissioned, and likely designed by Alvise Pisani, with the help of the architect Bortolo, known as "il Manopola", who served as proto of San Marco. The design was expanded over the succeeding decades, adding another floor. In 1751, a small palace with a facade on the Canal Grande was acquired. In the early 18th century, the architect Girolamo Frigimelica Roberti continued restructuring and expansion, creating towards the Campo one of the most ostentatious private palace facades in the city. The stone and marble facade once gated a small courtyard towards the street.

== Description ==
The entrance portal has statues by Girolamo Campagna, depicting two of the labors of Hercules: Slaying the Nemean Lion and Capturing Cereberus. In the atrium is a large ship lamp with three windows, il fanò, which was located on the quarterdeck of the galley of Andrea Pisani, once admiral of the Venetian fleet. The wood benches are carved with the coat of arms of the Pisani family, the rampant lions. The interior has two courtyards surrounded by colonnaded loggias.

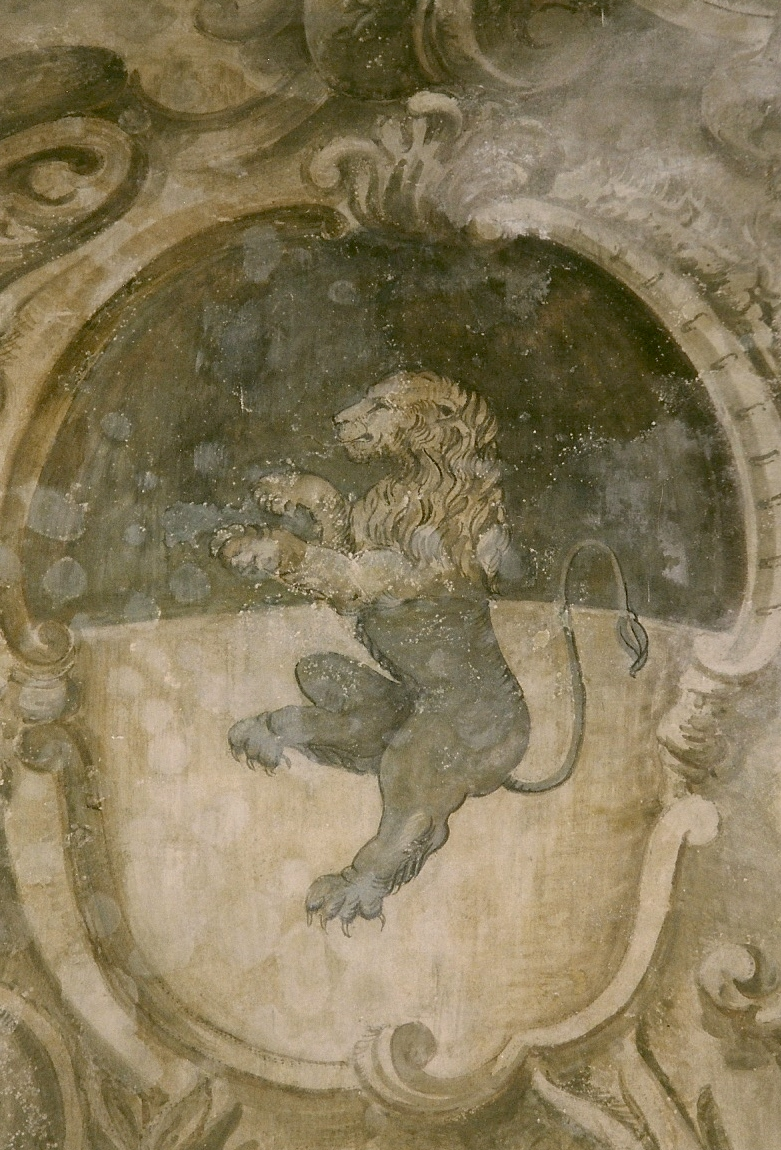
Coat of Arms of the Pisani family.

On the piano nobile, the portego, or entrance hall spans from the Campo to the Rio del Santissimo, and once displayed portraits of the Pisani family. Of the original canvases, only the portraits of Andrea (died 1618) and Alvise (1618–1679) remain. An inventory in 1809 of the other rooms of the palace catalogued 159 paintings, including works by Titian, Tintoretto, Paolo Veronese, and Palma il Vecchio. During the 19th century, nearly all the movable artworks, as well as the palace, were sold. The ceiling of the ballroom of the palace once had a large painting by Antonio Pellegrini.

Between 1897 and 1921 the City of Venice gradually became the sole owner of the building that housed the Liceo Società Musicale Benedetto Marcello, in the wing that faces the second courtyard, until in 1940, the palace was reserved for use exclusive of the Conservatory. The palazetto on the Gran Canal is now a separate boutique hotel.
