= Ilana Davidson =

American classical singer

Ilana Davidson is an American classical singer with an active international career in opera, concert, and chamber music. She has performed extensively throughout the United States and Europe, with a particular focus on early music, Mahler symphonies, and world premieres. Her recordings include a solo role in William Bolcom's Songs of Innocence and of Experience with Leonard Slatkin, which won four Grammy Awards including Best Classical Album.

== Early life and education ==
Born in 1976, raised in the Philadelphia region, she graduated from Carnegie Mellon University with a Bachelor of Music degree in vocal performance. She then pursued graduate studies at the Curtis Institute of Music where she earned a M.M. in Opera Performance and Voice. She appeared in several opera productions at Curtis, portraying such roles as the young girl in Viktor Ullmann's Der Kaiser von Atlantis, Despina in Mozart's Così fan tutte, Lady with a Hand Mirror in Dominick Argento's Postcard from Morocco, and Atalanta in Handel's Serse.

Davidson was a vocal fellow at the Tanglewood Music Center where she was a pupil of Phyllis Curtin. She was the recipient of a William Matheus Sullivan Music Foundation Grant. She is also a participant in the Aston Magna Early Music Academy.

== Career ==
Davidson sang Papagena in Mozart's Die Zauberflöte for her European debut at the Staatsoper Stuttgart.

She made her debut at Carnegie Hall as a soloist in William Bolcom's Songs of Innocence and of Experience under the baton of the composer with the St. Louis Symphony. She made her debut at the Jugendstiltheater in Vienna as the Queen in Krenek's Das geheime Königreich. She performed as the Chief of the Gepopo in Ligeti's Le Grand Macabre in Amsterdam and also in concert with conductor Jonathan Sheffer and his Eos Orchestra at the New York Society for Ethical Culture. She performed the role of Amor in the first modern revival of Giovanni Legrenzi's La divisione del mondo at the Schwetzingen Festival.

Davidson was the soprano soloist in Bach's Es erhub sich ein Streit, BWV 19 with the Orchestra of St. Luke's and the New York Baroque Soloists under conductor Mary Greer. She later performed with both groups again as the soprano soloist in Handel's Messiah and Bach's Christmas Oratorio.

Davidson was a soloist in Bolcom's Songs of Innocence and of Experience conducted by the composer with the University of Michigan orchestra and chorus; a performance that was recorded by Naxos Records. She performed in the world premiere of Libby Larson's Everyman Jack at the Sonoma Opera. She portrayed The Wife in the New York premiere of Philip Glass' and Robert Moran's The Juniper Tree at Avery Fisher Hall.

Davidson performed in a concert of Ernst Krenek's compositions at the Austrian Cultural Forum in New York City. In 2015 she performed the world premiere of Juantio Becenti's The Obsidian Morning at the New York Festival of Song. She also appeared at the Bard Music Festival with the American Symphony Orchestra as Mona Ginevra in Schillings Mona Lisa.

Davidson has made several appearances with the Dutch National Opera during her career, including Amor in Gluck's Orfeo ed Euridice, Chief of the Gepopo in Le Grand Macabre, the first Flowermaiden in Wagner's Parsifal, Oscar in Verdi's Un ballo in maschera, and Susanna in Mozart's Le nozze di Figaro. She has also appeared at the Florida Grand Opera, Flora in Britten's The Turn of the Screw and Amore in Monteverdi's L'incoronazione di Poppea, and at the Glimmerglass Opera.
