= Livio =

Livio is both a masculine Italian given name and a surname. Notable people with the name include:

== Given name ==
- Livio Abramo (1903–1993), Brazilian artist
- Livio Agresti (1508–1580), Italian painter
- Livio Bendaña Espinoza (born 1935), Nicaraguan footballer and manager
- Livio Berruti (1939–2026), Italian sprinter
- Livio Fongaro (1931–2007), Italian footballer and manager
- Livio Francecchini (1902–?), Italian boxer
- Livio Franceschini (1913–?), Italian basketball player
- Livio Isotti (1927–1999), Italian cyclist
- Livio Jean-Charles (born 1993), French basketball player
- Livio Maitan (1923–2004), Italian Trotskyist
- Livio Mehus (1630–1691), Flemish painter and engraver
- Livio Melina (born 1952), Italian Roman Catholic theologian
- Livio Minelli (1926–2012), Italian boxer
- Livio Lorenzon (1923–1971), Italian actor
- Livio Nabab (born 1988), French footballer
- Livio Pavanelli (1881–1958), Italian actor
- Livio Pin (born 1953), Italian footballer
- Livio Dante Porta (1922–2003), Argentine engineer
- Livio Prieto (born 1981), Argentine footballer
- Livio Catullo Stecchini (1913–1979), American historian
- Livio Trapè (born 1937), Italian cyclist
- Livio Vacchini (1933–2007), Swiss architect

== Surname ==
- Mario Livio (born 1945), Israeli astrophysicist and writer
