= Pietro Chiarini =

Italian composer (1717–1765)

Pietro Chiarini (circa 1717; Brescia – 1765; Cremona) was an Italian composer.

From 1738 to 1744, he was in Venice where four of his operas and an oratorio were performed. Later, he went to Cremona, where in 1754, he wrote and presented the intermezzo La donna dottor. He was later appointed maestro di cappella at the court of Cremona in 1756. It is speculated that Giovanni Battista Pergolesi's opera Il geloso schernito may in fact have been composed by Chiarini and not Pergolesi.

== Operas ==
- Argenide (libretto by Girolamo Alvise Giusti, opera seria, 1738, Venice)
- Arianna e Teseo (opera seria, 1739, Brescia)
- L'Issipile (libretto by Pietro Metastasio, opera seria, 1740, Brescia)
- Il finto pazzo (libretto by Carlo Goldoni after La contadina astuta by Tommaso Mariani, intermezzo, 1741, Venice)
- Achille in Sciro (libretto by Pietro Metastasio, opera seria, 1739)
- Artaserse (libretto by Pietro Metastasio, opera seria, 1741, Verona)
- Statira (libretto by Carlo Goldoni, opera seria, 1741, Venezia)
- Amor fa l'uomo cieco (libretto by Carlo Goldoni, intermezzo, 1742, Verona)
- Il Ciro riconosciuto (libretto by Pietro Metastasio, opera seria, 1743, Verona)
- I fratelli riconosciuti (opera seria, 1743, Verona)
- Meride e Salimunte (libretto by Apostolo Zeno, opera seria, 1744, Venezia)
- Alessandro nelle Indie (libretto by Pietro Metastasio, opera seria, 1744, Verona)
- Il geloso schernito (libretto by Giovanni Bertati, intermezzo, 1746)
- La Didone abbandonata (libretto by Pietro Metastasio, opera seria, 1748, Brescia)
- La donna dottoressa (intermezzo, 1754, Cremona)
- Ezio (libretto by Pietro Metastasio, opera seria, 1757, Cremona)

== Discography ==
- An aria from Meride e Selinunte in Gennaro D'Alessandro, Arie dall'opera Adelaide. Hamburg 1744, Francesco Divito (soprano maschile), «Benedetto Marcello» Baroque Ensemble, Ettore Maria Del Romano (direzione), Tactus, TC 710401, 2024.
