= Antonio Salvi =

Italian physician, court poet and librettist (1664–1724)

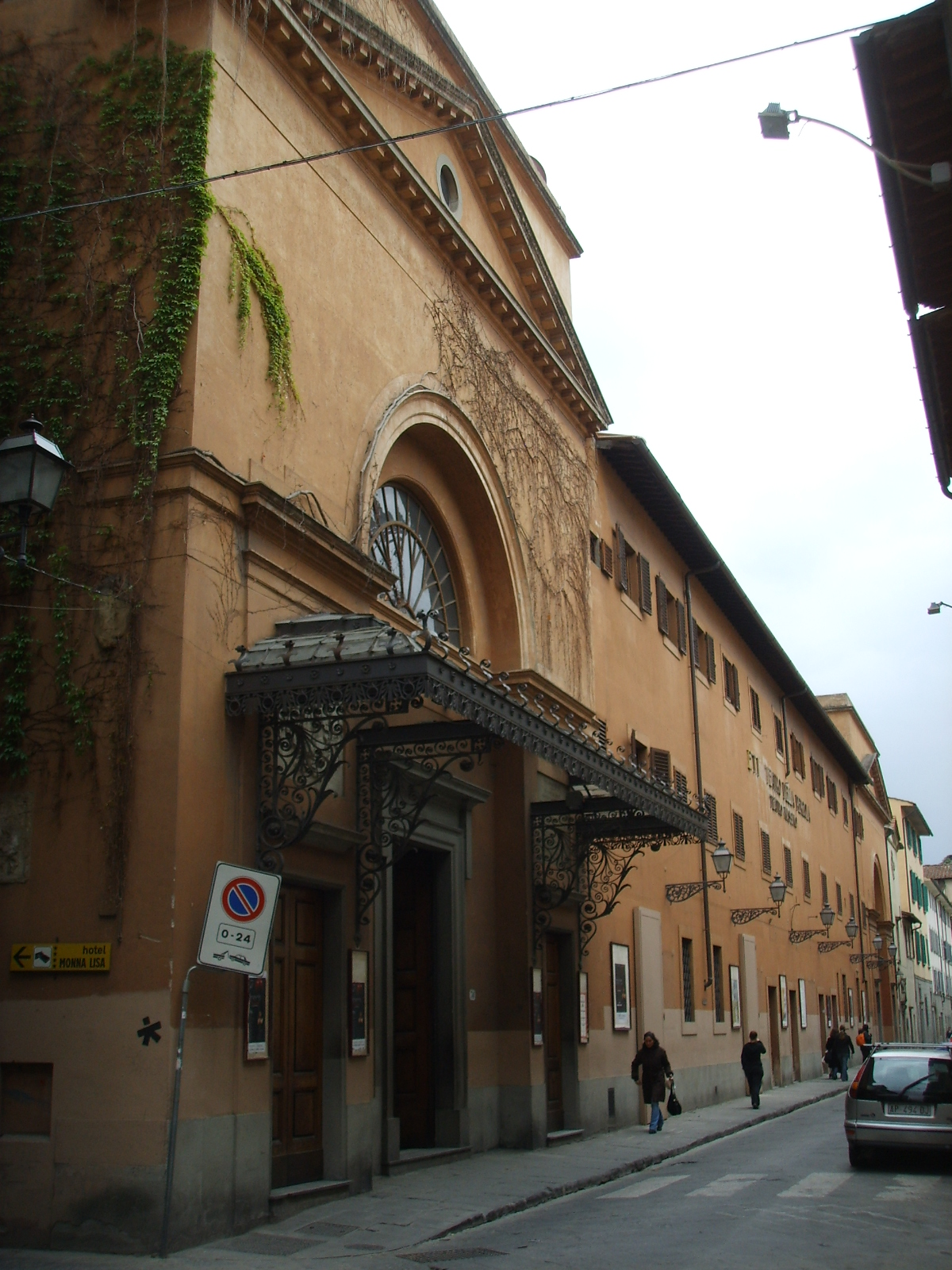
Teatro della Pergola in Florence

Antonio Salvi (17 January 1664 – 21 May 1724) was an Italian physician, court poet and librettist, active mainly in Florence, Italy. He was in the service of the grand-ducal court of Tuscany and the favourite librettist of Prince Ferdinando de' Medici. Salvi was one of the developers of the opera seria.

== Life ==
The son of Giovanni Salvi and Costanza Salvi (nee Bruni), Antonio Salvi was born in Lucignano, Valdichiana on 17 January 1664. His father was educated as a physician in Pisa and had a medical practice there. Antonio trained at the same medical school in that city; graduating with a philosophia et medicina diploma on December 29, 1685.

Salvi moved to Florence before the year 1690 where he established a medical practice and married Marta Isabella Boissin. Their son, Giovanni Claudio Salvi, was born in 1691 and would also train as a doctor at the same medical college in Pisa as his father and grandfather. Antonio became a court physician in Florence for the Medici family, and was a favorite opera librettist of Ferdinando de' Medici, Grand Prince of Tuscany.

From 1694 (?) Salvi wrote libretti for the theatre in Livorno and Florence and adapted works by Jean Racine and Molière.; Salvi took many of his plots from French tragedy. Between 1701 and 1710 seven of his works were performed in the Villa di Pratolino. After the death of Ferdinando (III) de' Medici in 1713 he decided to work outside the Grand Duchy of Tuscany: in Rome, Reggio Emilia, Turin, Venice and Munich. His libretti were set to music by several famous composers including Scarlatti, Vivaldi and Handel.

Antonio Salvi died in Florence on 21 May 1724, aged 60.

Vivaldi wrote three operas for Florence to texts by Antonio Salvi. All were produced at the Teatro della Pergola.

== Works ==
- Astianatte (1701), based on Andromaque by Jean Racine, set to music by Giacomo Antonio Perti, Antonio Maria Bononcini, Francesco Gasparini, Vinci, Giovanni Bononcini and Niccolò Jommelli
- Arminio (1703), set to music by Alessandro Scarlatti, Antonio Caldara, Carlo Francesco Pollarolo, Johann Adolph Hasse, Georg Friedrich Handel and Baldassare Galuppi
- Dionisio Re di Portogallo (1707), set to music by Georg Friedrich Handel as Sosarme
- Ginevra Principessa di Scozia (1708), set to music by Giacomo Antonio Perti and Antonio Vivaldi; as Ariodante set to music by Carlo Francesco Pollarolo, Georg Friedrich Handel and Georg Christoph Wagenseil
- Berenice (1709), set to music by Georg Friedrich Handel
- Rodelinda Regina de' Longobardi (1710), set to music by Giacomo Antonio Perti, Georg Friedrich Handel and Carl Heinrich Graun
- Lucio Papirio (1714), set to music by Francesco Gasparini, Luca Antonio Predieri, Leonardo Leo and Nicola Antonio Porpora
- Il pazzo per politica (1717), set to music by Luca Antonio Predieri und Tomaso Albinoni (as Eumene)
- Scanderbeg (1718), set to music by Antonio Vivaldi
- Adelaide (1722), set to music by Pietro Torri, Nicola Antonio Porpora, Georg Friedrich Handel (as Lotario), Giuseppe Maria Orlandini and Antonio Vivaldi.
