= Antonio Quintavalle =

Italian opera composer

Antonio Quintavalle (c. 1665 – c. 1724) was an Italian opera composer.

== Biography ==
He was probably born in Rome, where the beginning of his activity is documented starting from 1688; on 6 February of that year, in fact, his name appears among the members of the Congregation of Musicians of Rome, an association of musicians active in the city, which the following year commissioned him to play the organ on the occasion of the feast of Saint Cecilia and in December 1690 for the litanies sung monthly in the church of S. Carlo ai Catinari.

In 1688 his oratorio Iefte (libretto by Pietro Giubilei), was performed at the Roman Seminary. He composed a cantata for three voices (Marte, Europa, Amore) in two parts (text by Carlo Sigismondo Capece), performed in September 1689 for a fencing academy of the master Francesco Antonio Marcelli. Later, his oratorio Sacri amoris triumphus in conversion S Augustini Hipponensis Episcopi was performed in Lent 1694 at the SS. Crocifisso di S. Marcello.

He continued his musical activity away from Rome. He collaborated with Antonio Caldara and Carlo Francesco Pollarolo on the opera L'oracolo in sogno (libretto by Francesco Silvani), performed in Mantua in June 1699. In 1701 (or 1702) his oratorio Iefte was performed again with the title Il sacrificio di Iefte in Faenza in the house of the marquis Muzio Spada. During the carnival of 1704, his pastoral drama Il trionfo d'amore was performed in Mantua, where he had settled. In the spring of that year, in fact, he is mentioned as the "first organist" of Duke Ferdinando Carlo Gonzaga in the libretto of the pastoral fable Paride sull'Ida overo Gl'amori di Paride con Enone, performed in Mantua, which he set to music together with Caldara.

He probably had to leave Mantua following the deposition of Duke Ferdinando Carlo and the end of the duchy (1708).

In 1713 he was in Trento as chapel master of the prince-bishop Giovanni Michele Spaur and of the cathedral. In that year, his opera La Partenope (libretto by Silvio Stampiglia) was performed in the local Teatro Gaudenti. There is no information on the year of his death. According to Clemente Lunelli, he left Trento in 1724 to return to Mantua. However, he was living in Rome in 1720, when he addressed a petition to Prince Antonio Ottoboni in order to have a reward for music lessons given to some "Venetian ladies".

None of Quintavalle's works have survived to today.

An Antonio Quintavalle, chaplain at Torcello (Venice), who died on 28 January 1721 at the age of 45, is an homonymous.

== Works ==
=== Operas ===
- L'oracolo in sogno (1699) (with Antonio Caldara, Carlo Francesco Pollarolo)
- Il trionfo d'amore (1703)
- Paride sull'Ida, ovvero Gli amori di Paride con Enone (1704)
- Partenope (1713)

=== Oratorios ===
- Jefte (1688; again as *Il sacrificio di Jefte (1702))
- Sacri amoris triumphus in conversione S Augustini Hipponensis Episcopi (1694)

== Sources ==
- The New Grove Dictionary of Opera, edited by Stanley Sadie (1992), ISBN 0-333-73432-7 and ISBN 1-56159-228-5
