= Antonio Pampani =

Italian composer

Antonio Gaetano Pampani (21 February 1706 – December 1775) was an Italian composer, organist, and conductor of both operas and church choirs.

== Early life in Modena and Urbino ==
The son of Francesco Pampani and Anna Pampani (nee Rasori), Antonio Gaetano Pampani was born in Modena on 21 February 1706. He studied music with Filippo Salviati in Urbino; also beginning his career in that city as a musician in service to Cardinal Alamanno Salviati. He also worked as a musician in opera performances in Urbino; including conducting an opera there in July 1726.

== Career in Fano, Pesaro, and Fermo ==
On 18 July 1726 Pampani was appointed maestro di cappella of the Fano Cathedral; a post he held until resigning in July 1734. He concurrently worked as the conductor of the opera orchestra at the Teatro del Sole in Pesaro. His first opera, the short intermezzo Delbo mal maritato, was staged at that theatre in 1730. At the Teatro del Sole he also composed arias which were interpolated into operas by other composers, such as Giovanni Bononcini's Crispo (1730). He continued to work as an opera conductor in Pesaro through 1737. He also had two operas he composed staged in Venice in this period: L'Anagilda (1735) at the Teatro San Cassiano and Artaserse (1737) at the Teatro San Angelo.

Pampani's religious drama, Sedecia (a hybrid of an opera and oratorio), was premiered in Ascoli Satriano in 1736, and given a second time in Fermo in 1737. He became maestro di cappella at the Fermo Cathedral; officially assuming the post on 26 August 1737 and remaining there until resigning on 7 October 1746. His first oratorio, S Maurizio e compagni martiri, was premiered at the Santa Maria Nuova, Perugia in 1738. Two more of his religious dramas were staged for the first time in Fermo, Susanna (1738) and Assalonne (1739), and another oratorio, Ester (1740), was given in Mandola. His opera Semiramide riconosciuta was staged in Fermo in 1741, and his oratorio Il Giefte was given there in 1746.

== Later career in Venice ==
In 1746 Pampani was made a member of the Accademia Filarmonica di Bologna, and in the autumn of that same year he moved to Venice. He was initially employed there as organist at San Bartolomeo, Venice before succeeding Nicola Porpora in the post of maestro delle figlie at the Poveri Derelitti church on 29 May 1747. He directed both the chorus and orchestra of that institution, and was organist and a teacher of singing. Between 1749 and 1764 he composed a large body of music for performance at the Poveri Derelitti; including violin concerti, cello concerti, oratorios, motets, works for solo soprano and solo alto with orchestral accompaniment, and other sacred music. He continued to work there until February 1766 when financial problems led to the dismissal of most of the organization's staff, including Pampani.

While working as a church musician, Pampani continued to compose regularly for the opera stage into the 1750s for theaters in several Italian cities. Operas he wrote during this period included La caduta d'Amulio (1746, Venice), La clemenza di Tito (1748, Venice), Adriano in Siria (1750, Milan), Artaserse (1750, Venice), Venceslao (1752, Venice), Andromaca (1753, Rome), Madama Dulcinea, o Tiberio cuoco del maestro del bosco (1753, Pesaro), Eurione (1754, Rome), Astianatte (1755, Venice), Antigono (1757, Turin), and Demofoonte (1757, Rome). After this he did not produce an opera for almost ten years; producing two final operas stage in Venice in the 1760s: L'olimpiade (1766) and Il Demetrio (1768).

On 27 December 1767 Pampani was assumed the post of maestro di cappella at the Urbino Cathedral which he maintained until his death in Urbino in December 1775. The exact day of his death is unclear; although it was announced to the congregation at the Urbino Cathedral on 27 December 1775.
