= Giovanni Battista Brevi =

Italian Baroque composer

Giovanni Battista Brevi (Bergamo, ca. 1650; Milan, after 1725) was an Italian Baroque composer.

His later collections of cantatas comprised three out of the four publications of Fortuniano Rosati, Modena, the fourth being by count Pirro Albergati.

== Works ==
- Op. 3 Bizzarrie armoniche, ovvero Sonate da camera a tre stromenti col basso continuo 1693
- Op. 5 Cantate morali 1695
- Op. 6 La catena d'oro 1696
- Op. 7 Cantate ed'ariette 1697
- Op. 8 Deliri d'amor divino, o cantate a voce sola e continuo (Venice, 1708)

== Performing Editions ==
Cantatas

- Deliciae terrenae: soprano and Basso continuo
- O spiritus angelici: alto and Basso continuo
- Catenae terrenae: bass and b.c.

== Recordings ==
- "Catenae terrenae" on Motetti ed arie Max van Egmond, Ricercar Consort. Ricercar. 1988.
- "O Spiritus Angelici" on Agitata Delphine Galou, Accademia Bizantina, Ottavio Dantone, Alpha. 2017
