= Giovanni Battista Pescetti =

Italian composer (c. 1704 – 1766)

- Born: c. 1704; Venice
- Died: 20 March 1766
- Occupations: Harpsichordist; Composer; Opera general manager
- Organizations: Opera of the Nobility

Giovanni Battista Pescetti (c. 1704 – 20 March 1766) was an organist, harpsichordist, and composer known primarily for his operas and keyboard sonatas. Musicologist and University of California, Santa Barbara professor John E. Gillespie wrote that Pescetti "stylistically stands as a bridge between Alberti and Domenico Scarlatti".

== Life ==
Born in Venice, Pescetti was the son of organ builder Giacinto Pescetti. His mother, Giulia Pescetti (née Pollarolo), was the daughter of opera composer and organist Carlo Francesco Pollarolo and the sister of composer and organist Antonio Pollarolo. He studied in his native city under the organist and opera composer Antonio Lotti. He developed a friendship with Baldassare Galuppi, a fellow pupil of Lotti's, with whom he collaborated in creating and revising operas. From 1725 to 1732 he wrote operas for various theatres in Venice, sometimes in collaboration with Galuppi.

Pescetti left Italy for London in 1736, where he initially worked as a harpsichordist. He replaced Nicola Porpora as director of the Opera of the Nobility in 1737. In London, the opera singer Giovanni Manzuoli championed his music and became a close friend of his. In 1739 he published a set of ten keyboard sonatas entitled Sonate per gravicembalo in London. This work included arrangements of the overture and arias in his opera La conquista del velo d’oro. While stylistically his work exists in between that of Alberti and Scarlatti, some of his music displayed the influence of his London contemporary George Frideric Handel.

Pescetti probably left London around 1745 when hostility against Catholic Italians arose because of the Jacobite rebellion of Prince Charles and the Highland clans. He returned to Venice in 1747 and in 1762 was appointed second organist at St Mark's Basilica. He died in Venice on March 20, 1766.

Pescetti was active as a teacher of composition in Venice, his most famous students being Josef Mysliveček (1737–1781) and Antonio Salieri (1750–1825).

Allegretto in C major

Allegro ma non Presto
Both played by Martha Goldstein
