= Bernardo Sabadini =

Italian opera composer

Bernardo Sabadini (also known as Sabatini) (died 26 November 1718) was an Italian opera composer. He may have been a native of Venice. A number of his operas appear to have been revisions of works by other composers to an unknown extent. He died at Parma.

== Operas ==
- Furio Camillo (1686)
- Didio Giuliano (1687)
- Zenone il tiranno (1687)
- Olimpia placata (1687)
- L'Ercole trionfante (1688)
- Teseo in Atene (1688)
- Hierone tiranno di Siracusa (1688)
- Amor spesso inganna (1689)
- Teodora clemente (1689)
- Il Vespesiano (1689)
- La gloria d'Amore (1690)
- Il favore degli dei (1690)
- Pompeo continente (1690)
- Diomede punito da Alcide (1691)
- La pace fra Tolomeo e Seleuco (1691)
- Circe abbandonata da Ulisse (1692)
- Il Massimino (1692)
- Talestri innamorata d'Alessandro Magno (1693)
- Il riso nato fra il pianto (1694)
- Demetrio tiranno (1694)
- L'Orfeo (1694)
- La virtů trionfante dell'inganno (1697)
- L'Aiace (1697)
- L'Eusonia, overo La dama stravagante (1697)
- L'Alarico (1698)
- Il Domizio (1698)
- Il Ruggiero (1699)
- L'Eraclea (1700)
- Il Meleagro (1705)
- Alessandro amante eroe (1706)
- Annibale (1706)
- La virtů coronata, o sia Il Fernando (1714)
