= Severo De Luca =

Italian Baroque composer

Severo De Luca (fl. 1684–1734) was an Italian composer of the Baroque period.

== Life ==
It is believed that Severo De Luca was Neapolitan. After moving to Rome in 1688, De Luca worked for Spanish ambassadors, although he is not listed among musicians employed by other Roman patrons. There is a possibility that Gioseppe De Luca might have been related to Severo as his name was present in some of these lists. In 1704, De Luca was appointed maestro di cappella, or chapel master, of the Congregazione di S. Giacomo degli Spagnuoli. He later joined the Congregazione di S Cecilia as a chapel master in 1708. Due to accusations of neglect and a dispute with his assistant, Giuseppe Valentini, De Luca was fired from his post in 1734.

== Music ==
Severo De Luca composed a variety of music including operas, serenatas, oratorios, cantatas and sacred works. The first known composition by De Luca was an opera composed in Naples titled L'Epaminonda in December 1685. This was his only completed opera, contributing only an Act 1 to his later operatic works. Ten years later, De Luca composed the serenata La nova gara delle dee in celebration of Maria de Giron y Sandoval, performing the work in August 1694 at the Palazzo di Spagna. In 1696, De Luca's serenata for two voices was printed, becoming one of the few serenata's printed in Rome during that time. Four of his serenatas were commissioned by Spanish ambassadors, similarly to his final opera. De Luca's last collaborative opera was La clemenza d'Augusto in 1697.

== List of works ==
=== Operas ===
- L'Epaminonda, 1684
- La costanza nell'amor divino, overo La Santa Rosalia, 1696
- La clemenza d'Augusto, 1697

=== Serenatas ===
- Cantata per musica, 1688
- La nova gara delle dee, 1694
- Serenata, 2 voices, 1696
- Applausi delle virtù, 1701

=== Cantatas ===
- Ah che tante sventure
- Amo Clori
- Arse gran tempo è vero
- Care labbra del mio bene
- Desiri partite pensiere volate
- È incostante la bellezza
- E ti par poco che ch'io dato il cor
- Io che per colpa sol del fato rio
- La mia Lilla
- O di luci da notte
- Parti l'idolo mio
- Pria che d'eto initri
- Rusignuol che tempri il canto

=== Sacred ===
- Hierusalem excidium, 1688
- Il martirio di S Erasmo, 1700
- Foligno, 1710
- De lamentatione Jeremie
- Dia sono amabile
- Vieni o mia cara
