= Giuseppe Aldrovandini =

Italian Baroque composer

Giuseppe Antonio Vincenzo Aldrovandini (also Gioseffo, Giuseppe Maria, Aldovrandini, Aldrovandin, Aldrovandon, Altrobrandino; 8 June 1671 – 9 February 1707) was an Italian Baroque composer.

Aldovrandini was born and died in Bologna. He is credited with writing over twenty operas and oratorios, including the 1696 opera Dafni, as well as many other instrumental compositions and arias. His other operas include L'Incoronazione di Dario, La Semiramide, Cesare in Alessandria and others. Aldrovandini composed a Magnificat in C major and a Sonata in C major.
