= Matteo Noris =

Italian poet (1640–1714)

Matteo Noris (1640, Venice – 6 October 1714, Treviso) was an Italian poet.

At least two of his poems were used as libretti by Handel, for his operas Lotario and Sosarme, although Antonio Salvi is usually credited entirely.
