= Teatro Malibran =

Theatre in Venice, Italy

Coordinates: 45.439007°N 12.337824°E

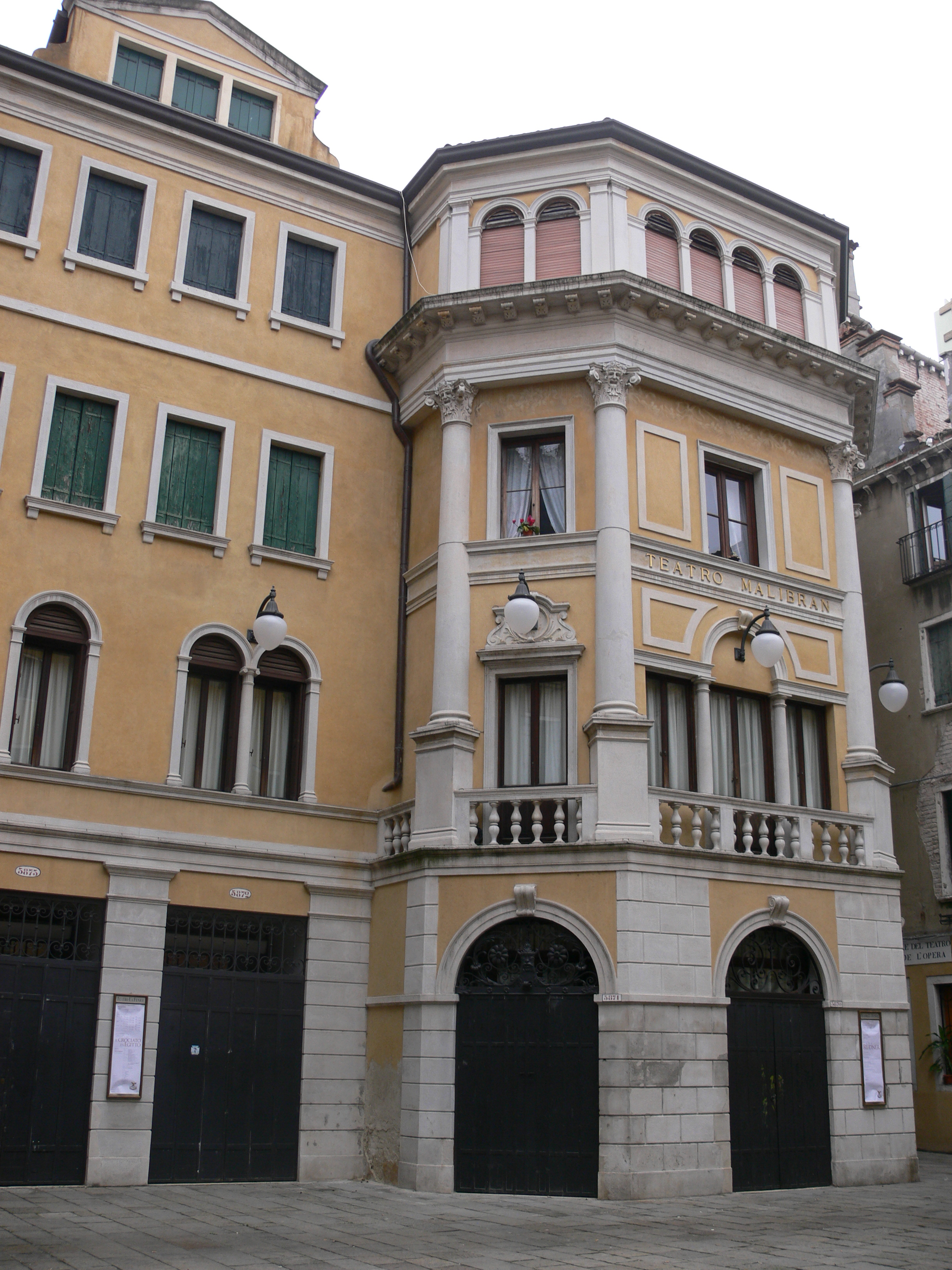
Teatro Malibran façade

The Teatro Malibran, known over its lifetime by a variety of names, beginning with the Teatro San Giovanni Grisostomo (or Crisostomo) after the nearby church, is an opera house in Venice which was inaugurated in 1678 with a production of the premiere of Carlo Pallavicino's opera Vespasiano. By 1683, it had quickly become known as "the biggest, most beautiful and richest theatre in the city" and its operatic importance throughout the 17th and 18th centuries led to an even grander description by 1730:

A true kingdom of marvels....that with the vastness of its magnificent dimension can be rightly compared to the splendours of ancient Rome and that with the grandeur of its more than regal dramatic performances has now conquered the applause and esteem of the whole world.

Richly decorated, the theatre consisted of five levels of thirty boxes and a large stalls area. However, as an opera house, its success was short-lived and from 1751 to 1800, opera was rarely performed there. Taken over by the municipality in 1797, it became the Teatro Civico until purchased by a partnership and restored in 1819. It re-opened again, this time in private hands, with Rossini's La gazza ladra. But deterioration continued, the partnership broke up, and the remaining partner, Giovanni Gallo, continued with additional refurbishment, giving it the new name of the Teatro Emeronitto (Theatre of Day and Night) and inaugurating it in December 1834 with Donizetti's L'elisir d'amore.

When the famous soprano Maria Malibran came to sing Vincenzo Bellini's La sonnambula on 8 April 1835, she was clearly appalled at the condition of the theatre since Lynn reports that "she refused her fee, telling the impresario to 'use it for the theatre' " At that point the opera house became the Teatro Malibran in the singer's honour and it is the name by which the theatre has been known ever since.

== As the Teatro San Giovanni Grisostomo ==
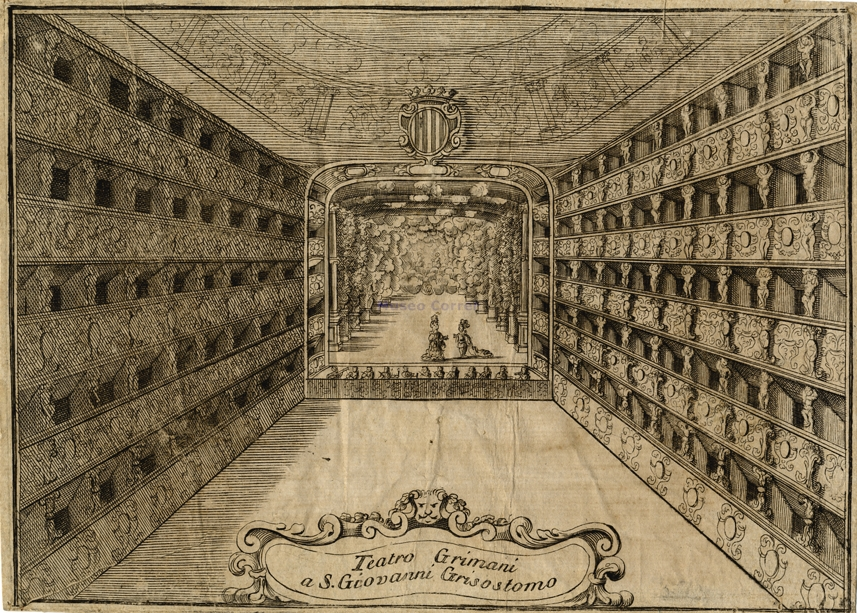
Internal view of the Teatro Grimani a San Giovanni Grisostomo of 1709. Engraving by Vincenzo Maria Coronelli

The theatre was built on the site of the former residence of the traveller Marco Polo and designed by Thomas Bezzi for the Grimani family. It became a venue for opera in Venice featuring high quality singers such as Margherita Durastanti who served as prima donna between 1709 and 1712. Alessandro Scarlatti's opera Mitridate Eupatore received its premiere there on 5 January 1707, while Georg Friedrich Händel's Agrippina premiered on 26 December 1709. The theatre also presented work by Carlo Francesco Pollarolo.

During the 1730s, the San Giovanni Grisostomo began a slow and inexorable decline, although managing to keep its position at the head of Venetian theatres until the middle of the eighteenth century. In 1737, when Carlo Goldoni was placed in charge of the Venetian stage, prose works began to be performed (many of these his own comedies). Subsequently, because of its considerable size, the Grimani family decided to open a smaller theater in 1755, the San Benedetto. The opening of this new stage led to the end of the dominance of the San Giovanni, which saw a slow decrease in performance.

Following the fall of the Republic of Venice and the French occupation, the theatre was among the few not to be closed.

Night view of the theater

== As the Teatro Malibran ==
In 1819 it was sold to Gallo, who restored it in 1834; in 1837 he changed the name to Teatro Malibran, in honor of the famous singer Spanish mezzo-soprano Maria Malibran. In 1849 the return of the Austrians to Venice provoked the closure of all the major theatres of Venice as protest, but the Malibran was the exception.

Gallo's son took over in 1852; it was auctioned in 1886 then radically redecorated in the Egyptian style; it was closed for six years after a single operatic season in 1913 due to security problems, but it re-opened to present Verdi's Otello in December 1919 plus much of the popular Italian repertory after that. The Malibran was active in the presentation of operas, operettas, and even showed films for the first half of the 20th century.

In 1992 the municipality of Venice purchased the theatre, and the action which they took—especially that following the destruction of the Teatro La Fenice in January 1996—is recounted on the Commune de Venezia's website:

When the Venice City Council bought the Malibran, it marked a new phase for the theatre: the restoration of the roof was meant to be the starting point of an extremely detailed project by Antonio Foscari to completely restore the building and modify the structures, in particular to extend the gallery and boxes. When the Fenice was destroyed in a fire in January 1996, the Malibran was placed in the limelight because it had become even more indispensable. Thus, the decision was taken to respect the entire original architectural structure rather than radically change the installations and increase the set machinery so that the project would be approved more rapidly and with innovative procedures. During restoration the orchestra pit was also enlarged and an enormous underground basin was made to collect the water from Venice's occasional flooding that could have filled the entire theatre with water.

The interior decorations of the Malibran were also restored, paying particular attention to the colours sought by Donghi, previously hidden by various layers of plaster. By supporting the conservative restoration of the magnificent curtain by Giuseppe Cherubini in tempera on canvas with golden and silver yarn, the Associazione Amici della Fenice (Friends of the Fenice Association) made an important contribution to the re-opening of one of Venice's most important historical theatres that seats 900 people and is now once again an active part of the city's life.

The Malibran became the temporary home to the Fenice orchestra and, after a decade of work, the 900-seat Malibran was re-opened on 23 May 2001 by President Carlo Azeglio Ciampi, with a gala concert which included excerpts of operas by Verdi (the centennial of his death), by Bellini (the centennial of his birth) and also work by Wagner. It continues to function as an alternative venue for productions from La Fenice as well as staging many of its own:

In 1991, together with the Fenice's dance company, Carolyn Carlson presented her first performance, Undici Onde, created specifically for the Fenice [...]The ample scenic space of the Malibran has also seen performances by Pina Bausch, some of which were Italian premieres.

== See also ==
- Opera houses and theatres in Venice
- List of opera houses worldwide
