= Marc'Antonio Ziani =

Italian composer

Marc'Antonio Ziani (c. 1653 – 22 January 1715) was an Italian composer living in Vienna.

Ziani was born in Venice. He probably studied with his uncle, the organist Pietro Andrea Ziani. He began composing operas in his native city in the 1670s with his first opera, La schiava fortunata, premiering on New Year's Day 1674 at the Teatro San Moisè. From 1686 to 1691 Ziani was maestro di cappella to Duke Ferdinando Carlo di Gonzaga in Mantua, but simultaneously continued his career as an opera composer in Venice. In 1700 Ziani was appointed vice Hofkapellmeister to Leopold I in Vienna, and on 1 January 1712 Charles VI promoted him to Hofkapellmeister. He was succeeded by Johann Fux. He died in Vienna.

== Recordings ==
- Alma Redemptoris Mater, in Stabat Mater: Sances, Bertali, Schmelzer. Carlos Mena & Ricercar Consort, Philippe Pierlot conductor. Mirare. 2007.
- La Morte vinta sul Calvario (1706). Les Traversées Baroques, Etienne Meyer conductor. Accent Records. 2024.

== Scores ==
- IMSLP
