= Aurelio Aureli =

Italian librettist

Aurelio Aureli (Venice, before 1652 – id. after 1708) was an Italian librettist.

== Life ==
Little is known about Aureli's life. He began his operatic career in 1652 with L'Erginda. Until 1687, he worked as a librettist mainly in Venice, except for a brief trip to Vienna. In Venice he was a member of the Accademia degli Imperfetti and perhaps also of the Accademia degli Incogniti. From 1688 to 1694 he was, however, in the service of the Duke of Parma, during which time he wrote a dozen plays, almost all of which were subsequently set to music by the court composer Bernardo Sabadini. The last librettos were written in Venice and other cities of the Republic.

== Work ==
His works include over 50 libretti, including:

- L'Erginda (1652), set to music by Gasparo Sartorio
- Erismena (1655), set to music by Francesco Cavalli
- Le fortune di Rodope e Damira, Pietro Andrea Ziani, Venise (1657);
- Il Perseo, set to music by Andrea Mattioli, Venise, Teatro ai SS. Giovanni e Paolo, (1665);
- diverse versioni de L'Eliogabalo, set to music by Giovanni Antonio Boretti and Francesco Cavalli (1668); and by Pietro Simone Agostini (1670);
- La costanza di Rosmonda, set to music by Pietro Simone Agostini (1670);
- Alessandro Magno in Sidone, set to music by Marc'Antonio Ziani, Venise, Teatro Grimano ai Santi Giovanni e Paolo, Carnaval 1679; Naples, Royal Palace of Naples, 6 November 1679, then Vicence, Teatro di Piazza, 1682, then under the title La Virtù Sublimata dal Grande, overo il Macedone continente, Venise, Teatro di Cannaregio, 1683; Padoue, Teatro Obizzi, 26 December 1706;
- Talestri innamorata d'Alessandro Magno, Bernardo Sabadini;
- La ninfa bizzarra, Marc'Antonio Ziani, Novo Teatro sulla Brenta, Dolo (1697), (several times revived), Rovigo, in 1706 under the title Gli amanti delusi, Venise, in 1708 under the title Il cieco geloso set to music by Polani, San Giovanni in Persiceto, in 1729 under thee title Amore e gelosia set to music by Buini; then taken over by Johann Adolf Hasse);
- Rosane imperatrice degli Assirij, Venice, end of the 17th century.
- Medea, Venise, 1675, music by Zanettini (ou Gianettini). This opera opened the Hangar du Quai aux Foins in Brussels on 24 January 1682, the precursor of la Monnaie inaugurated in 1700.
