= List of operas by Baldassare Galuppi =

This is a complete list of the operas of the Italian composer Baldassare Galuppi (1706–1785).

== List ==
Title	Genre	Subdivisions	Libretto	Première date	Place, theatre	Notes
La fede nell'incostanza	favola pastorale	3 acts	Giovanni Battista Neri	1722	Vicenza, Teatro delle Grazie	Revision: Gli amici rivali, Chioggia, Nuovo Teatro Boegan, 1722
Gl'odi delusi dal sangue	opera seria	3 acts	Antonio Maria Lucchini	4 February 1728	Venice, Teatro Sant'Angelo	Acts 1 and 3; act 2 composed by Giovanni Battista Pescetti
Dorinda	favola pastorale	3 acts	Anonymous (revision by Domenico Lalli)	9 June 1729	Venice, Teatro San Samuele	Collaboration with Giovanni Battista Pescetti
L'odio placato	opera seria	3 acts	Francesco Silvani	27 December 1729	Venice, Teatro San Samuele	
Argenide	opera seria	3 acts	Girolamo Giusti	15 January 1733	Venice, Teatro Sant'Angelo	
L'ambizione depressa	opera seria	3 acts	Giuseppe Papis	Ascension 1733	Venice, Teatro Sant'Angelo	
La ninfa Apollo	favola pastorale	3 acts	Francesco de Lemene, with additions by Giovanni Boldini	30 May 1734	Venice, Teatro San Samuele	
Tamiri	opera seria	3 acts	Bartolomeo Vitturi	17 November 1734	Venice, Teatro Sant'Angelo	
Elisa regina di Tiro	opera seria	3 acts	Apostolo Zeno and Pietro Pariati	27 January 1736	Venice, Teatro Sant'Angelo	
Ergilda	opera seria	3 acts	Bartolomeo Vitturi	12 November 1736	Venice, Teatro Sant'Angelo	
L'Alvilda	opera seria	3 acts	Domenico Lalli (after L'amor generoso by Apostolo Zeno)	29 May 1737	Venice, Teatro San Samuele	
Issipile	opera seria	3 acts	Pietro Metastasio	26 December 1737	Turin, Teatro Regio	Second version: Bologna, 1750
Alessandro nell'Indie	opera seria	3 acts	Pietro Metastasio	January(?) 1738	Mantua, Nuovo Teatro Arciducale	Second version: Naples, Teatro San Carlo, 20 January 1754 Third version: Parma, Carnival 1755
Adriano in Siria	opera seria	3 acts	Pietro Metastasio	January(?) 1740	Turin, Teatro Regio	Second version: Livorno, Spring 1758
Gustavo primo, re di Svezia	opera seria	3 acts	Carlo Goldoni	25 May 1740	Venice, Teatro San Samuele	
Didone abbandonata	opera seria	3 acts	Pietro Metastasio	26 December 1740	Modena, Teatro Molza	Second version: Venice, Teatro San Benedetto, 1764
Oronte, re de' Sciti	opera seria	3 acts	Carlo Goldoni	26 December 1740	Venice, Teatro Grimani di San Giovanni Grisostomo	
Berenice	opera seria	3 acts	Bartolomeo Vitturi	27 January 1741	Venice, Teatro Sant'Angelo	
Penelope	opera seria	3 acts	Paolo Antonio Rolli	12 December 1741	London, King’s Theatre in the Haymarket	
Scipione in Cartagine	opera seria	3 acts	Francesco Vanneschi	2 March 1742	London, King’s Theatre in the Haymarket	
Enrico	opera seria	3 acts	Francesco Vanneschi	1 January 1743	London, King’s Theatre in the Haymarket	
Sirbace	opera seria	3 acts	Claudio Nicola Stampa	5 April 1743	London, King’s Theatre in the Haymarket	
Arsace	opera seria	3 acts	Antonio Salvi	16 November 1743	Venice, Teatro Grimani di San Giovanni Grisostomo	
Ricimero	opera seria	3 acts	Francesco Silvani	26 December 1744	Milan, Teatro Regio Ducale	Second version: Naples, Teatro San Carlo, 4 November 1753
La forza d'amore	dramma giocoso	3 acts	Demetrio Panicelli	30 January 1745	Venice, Teatro San Cassiano	
Ciro riconosciuto	opera seria	3 acts	Pietro Metastasio	26 December 1745	Milan, Teatro Regio Ducale	Second version: Rome, Teatro Argentina, Carnival 1759
Il trionfo della continenza	favola pastorale	3 acts		28 January 1746	London, King’s Theatre in the Haymarket	
Antigono	opera seria	3 acts	Pietro Metastasio	24 May 1746	London, King’s Theatre in the Haymarket	Second version: Venice, Teatro San Benedetto, Carnival 1762
Scipione nelle Spagne	opera seria	3 acts	Agostino Piovene	November 1746	Venice, Teatro Sant'Angelo	
Evergete	opera seria	3 acts	Francesco Silvani and Domenico Lalli	2 January 1747	Rome, Teatro Capranica	
L'Arminio	opera seria	3 acts	Antonio Salvi	26 November 1747	Venice, Teatro San Cassiano	
L'Olimpiade	opera seria	3 acts	Pietro Metastasio	26 December 1747	Milan, Teatro Regio Ducale	
Vologeso	opera seria	3 acts	Apostolo Zeno	13 (or 14) February 1748	Rome, Teatro Argentina	
Demetrio	opera seria	3 acts	Pietro Metastasio	16 (or 27) October 1748	Vienna, Burgtheater	Second version: Padua, Teatro Nuovo, June 1761
Clotilde	opera seria	3 acts	Francesco Passerini	November 1748	Venice, Teatro San Cassiano	
Semiramide riconosciuta	opera seria	3 acts	Pietro Metastasio	25 January 1749	Milan, Teatro Regio Ducale	
Artaserse	opera seria	3 acts	Pietro Metastasio	27 January 1749	Vienna, Burgtheater	Second version: Padua, Teatro Nuovo, 11 June 1751
L'Arcadia in Brenta	dramma giocoso	3 acts	Carlo Goldoni	14 May 1749	Venice, Teatro Sant'Angelo	
Demofoonte	opera seria	3 acts	Pietro Metastasio	18 December 1749	Madrid, Theater of Buen Retiro	Second version: Padua, Teatro Nuovo, June 1758
Alcimena principessa dell'Isole Fortunate, ossia L'amore fortunato ne' suoi disprezzi	opera seria	3 acts	Pietro Chiari (after La princesse d'Elide by Molière)	26 December 1749	Venice, Teatro San Cassiano	
Arcifanfano re dei matti	dramma giocoso	3 acts	Carlo Goldoni	27 December 1749	Venice, Teatro San Moisè	
Il mondo della luna	dramma giocoso	3 acts	Carlo Goldoni	29 January 1750	Venice, Teatro San Moisè	
Il paese della Cuccagna	dramma giocoso	3 acts	Carlo Goldoni	7 May 1750	Venice, Teatro San Moisè	
Il mondo alla roversa, ossia Le donne che comandano	dramma giocoso	3 acts	Carlo Goldoni	14 November 1750	Venice, Teatro San Cassiano	
Antigona	opera seria	3 acts	Gaetano Roccaforte	9 January 1751	Rome, Teatro delle Dame	
Dario	opera seria	3 acts	Giovanni Baldanza	Carnival 1751	Turin, Teatro Regio	
Lucio Papirio	opera seria	3 acts	Apostolo Zeno	1751	Reggio Emilia, Teatro Pubblico	
Il conte Caramella	dramma giocoso	3 acts	Carlo Goldoni	Autumn 1751	Venice	
Le virtuose ridicole	dramma giocoso	3 acts	Carlo Goldoni (after Les Précieuses ridicules by Molière)	Carnival 1752	Venice, Teatro San Samuele	
La calamita de' cuori	dramma giocoso	3 acts	Carlo Goldoni	26 December 1752	Venice, Teatro San Samuele	
I bagni d'Abano	dramma giocoso	3 acts	Carlo Goldoni	10 February 1753	Venice, Teatro San Samuele	
Sofonisba	opera seria	3 acts	Gaetano Roccaforte	24(?) February 1753	Rome, Teatro delle Dame	Second version (libretto by Mattia Veraz): Turin, Teatro Regio, Carnival 1764
L'eroe cinese	opera seria	3 acts	Pietro Metastasio	10 July 1753	Naples, Teatro San Carlo	
Siroe	opera seria	3 acts	Pietro Metastasio	10 February 1754	Rome, Argentina	
Il filosofo di campagna	dramma giocoso	3 acts	Carlo Goldoni	26 October 1754	Venice, Teatro San Samuele	
Il povero superbo	dramma giocoso	3 acts	Carlo Goldoni	February 1755	Venice, Teatro San Samuele	Revision: La serva astuta, Brescia, 1755
Attalo	opera seria	3 acts	Francesco Silvani (or Antonio Papi)	11 June 1755	Padua, Teatro Nuovo	
Le nozze	dramma giocoso	3 acts	Carlo Goldoni	14 September 1755	Bologna, Teatro Formagliari	Revision: Le nozze di Dorina, Reggio Emilia, 1770
La diavolessa	dramma giocoso	3 acts	Carlo Goldoni	November 1755	Venice, Teatro San Samuele	Also as L'avventuriera or Li vaghi accidenti fra amore e gelosia
Idomeneo	opera seria			7 January 1756	Rome, Teatro Argentina	
La cantarina	farsetta	3 acts	Carlo Goldoni	26 February 1756	Rome, Capranica	
Ezio	opera seria	3 acts	Pietro Metastasio	22 January 1757	Milan, Teatro Regio Ducale	
Sesostri	opera seria	3 acts	Pietro Pariati	26 November 1757	Venice, Teatro San Benedetto	
Ipermestra	opera seria	3 acts	Pietro Metastasio	14 January 1758	Milan, Teatro Regio Ducale	
Melite riconosciuto	opera seria	3 acts	Gaetano Roccaforte	13 January 1759	Rome, Teatro delle Dame	
La ritornata di Londra	intermezzo		Carlo Goldoni	19(?) February 1759	Rome, Teatro Valle	
La clemenza di Tito	opera seria	3 acts	Pietro Metastasio	Carnival 1760	Venice, Teatro San Salvatore	
Solimano	opera seria	3 acts	Giovanni Ambrogio Migliavacca	11 June 1760	Padua, Teatro Nuovo	
L'amante di tutte	dramma giocoso	3 acts	Antonio Galuppi	15 November 1760	Venice, Teatro San Moisè	
Li tre amanti ridicoli	dramma giocoso	3 acts	Antonio Galuppi	18 January 1761	Venice, Teatro San Moisè	
Il caffè di campagna	dramma giocoso	3 acts	Pietro Chiari	18 November 1761	Venice, Teatro San Moisè	
Il marchese villano	dramma giocoso	3 acts	Pietro Chiari	2 February 1762	Venice, Teatro San Moisè	Revisions: La lavandara, Turin, 1770; La lavandara astuta, Mantua, 1771; Il matrimonio per inganno, Venice, Teatro di San Giacomo di Corfù
L'orfana onorata	intermezzo			Carnival 1762	Rome, Teatro Valle	
Il re pastore	opera seria	3 acts	Pietro Metastasio	Spring 1762	Parma, Teatro Ducale	
Viriate	opera seria	3 acts	Pietro Metastasio (after Siface)	19 May 1762	Venice, Teatro San Salvatore	
Il Muzio Scevola	opera seria	3 acts	Carlo Giuseppe Lanfranchi Rossi	June 1762	Padua, Teatro Nuovo	
L'uomo femina	dramma giocoso	3 acts		Autumn 1762	Venice, Teatro San Moisè	
Il puntiglio amoroso	dramma giocoso	3 acts	Carlo (or Gasparo) Gozzi	26 December 1762	Venice, Teatro San Moisè	
Arianna e Teseo	opera seria	3 acts	Pietro Pariati	12 June 1763	Padua, Teatro Nuovo	Second version: Venice, Carnival 1769
Il re alla caccia	dramma giocoso	3 acts	Carlo Goldoni	Autumn 1763	Venice, Teatro San Samuele	
Cajo Mario	opera seria	3 acts	Gaetano Roccaforte	31 May 1764	Venice, Teatro Grimani di San Giovanni Grisostomo	
La partenza e il ritorno de' marinari	dramma giocoso	3 acts		26 December 1764	Venice, Teatro San Moisè	
La cameriera spiritosa	dramma giocoso	3 acts	Carlo Goldoni	4 October 1766	Milan, Teatro Regio Ducale	Revision: Il cavaliere della Piuma, Prague, 1768–9(?)
Ifigenia in Tauride	opera seria	3 acts	Marco Coltellini	2 May (21 April) 1768	Saint Petersburg, Court Theater	
Amor lunatico	dramma giocoso	3 acts	Pietro Chiari	January 1770	Venice, Teatro San Moisè	
L'inimico delle donne	dramma giocoso	3 acts	Giovanni Bertati	Autumn 1771	Venice, Teatro San Samuele	
Gl'intrighi amorosi	dramma giocoso	3 acts	Giuseppe Petrosellini	January 1772	Venice, Teatro San Samuele	
Motezuma	opera seria	3 acts	Vittorio Amedeo Cigna-Santi	27 May 1772	Venice, Teatro San Benedetto	
La serva per amore	dramma giocoso	3 acts	Filippo Livigni	October 1773	Venice, Teatro San Samuele	

=== Doubtful ===
- Bertoldo, Bertoldino e Cacasenno, Venice, Teatro San Moisè, 27 December 1748
- La mascherata, dramma comico in 3 acts, libretto by Carlo Goldoni, Venice, Teatro San Cassiano, 26 December 1750 (probably in part or all by Gioacchino Cocchi)
- La finta cameriera, dramma giocoso in 3 acts, libretto by Giovanni Gualberto Barlocci, Brunswick, 1751
- Astianatte, 1755
- Alceste
- La fausse coquette

=== Revisions and additions ===
- Siroe re di Persia (after Leonardo Vinci), opera seria in 3 acts, libretto by Pietro Metastasio), Venice, Teatro Grimani di San Giovanni Grisostomo, Carnival 1731 (in collaboration with Giovanni Battista Pescetti
- Alessandro in Persia, 1741
- L'ambizione delusa (after Rinaldo di Capua), dramma giocoso in 3 acts, libretto by Francesco Vanneschi after La commedia in commedia by Cosimo Antonio Pelli, Venice, Teatro San Cassiano, Autumn 1744
- Madama Ciana (after Gaetano Latilla), dramma giocoso in 3 acts, libretto by Giovanni Gualberto Barlocci (or Cosimo Antonio Pelli), Venice, Teatro San Cassiano, probably Autumn 1744
- La libertà nociva (after Rinaldo di Capua), dramma giocoso in 3 acts, libretto by Giovanni Gualberto Barlocci, Venice, Teatro San Cassiano, 22 November 1744
- Antigono, 1746
- Il protettore alla moda (after Chi non fa non falla by an anonymous composer), dramma giocoso in 3 acts, libretto by Giuseppe Maria Buini, Venice, Teatro San Cassiano, Autumn 1749
- Il villano geloso, 1769

== Sources ==
- Monson, Dale E. (1992). "Galuppi, Baldassare". In Sadie, Stanley (ed.). The New Grove Dictionary of Opera. Vol. 2. Oxford University Press. ISBN 978-0-19-522186-2.
- Monson, Dale E. (2001). "Galuppi, Baldassare". The New Grove Dictionary of Music and Musicians.
