= Furlanetto =

Furlanetto is a surname. Notable people with the surname include:

- Alessio Furlanetto (born 2002), Italian footballer
- Ferruccio Furlanetto (born 1949), Italian bass
- Bonaventura Furlanetto, (1738–1817), Italian composer and music teacher
- Vanesa Furlanetto (born 1987), Argentine former tennis player
- Valentino Furlanetto (born 1965), former international speedway rider from Italy
