= Flat panel =

Flat panel or flat-panel may refer to:

- Flat-panel detector, in x-ray radiography
- Flat-panel display, in electronic display technology
- Flat panel eavesdropping, in computer network surveillance
- Flat panel loudspeakers, in audio speaker technology
- Flat-panel membrane, in computer keyboard technology
- Flat panel photobioreactor, in algaculture
- Flat-panel photovoltaics, in solar energy technology

== See also ==
- Flat
- Panel
- frame and panel
