= Il filosofo di campagna =

Dramma giocoso per musica by Baldassare Galuppi

- Opera by Baldassare Galuppi
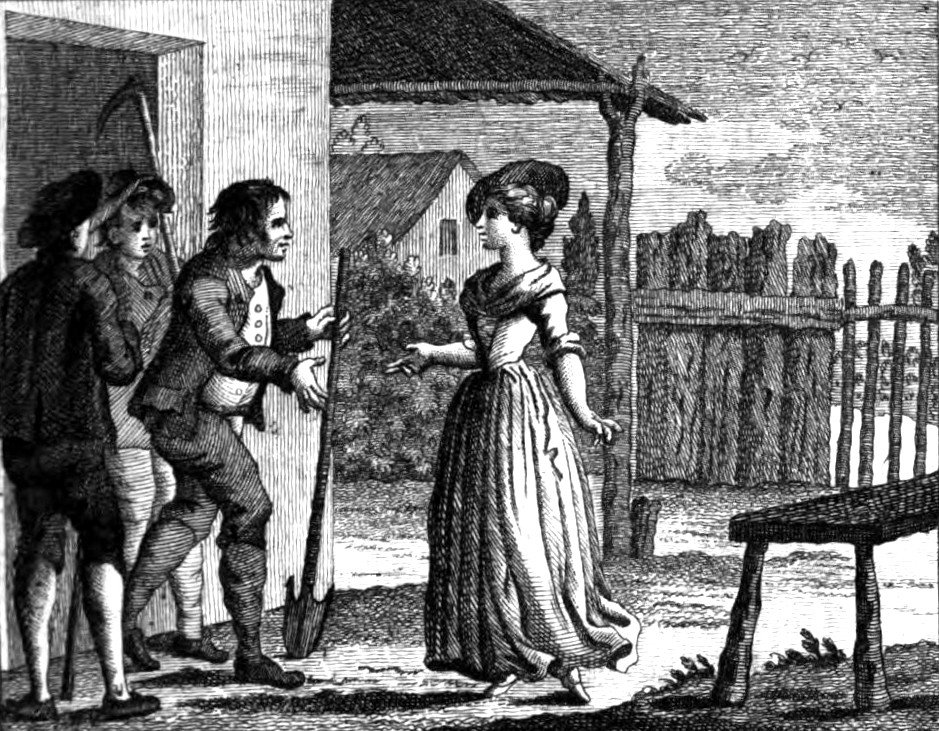
- Illustration from the 1795 publication of Goldoni's libretto
- Librettist: Carlo Goldoni
- Language: Italian
- Premiere: 26 October 1754; Teatro San Samuele, Venice

Il filosofo di campagna (The Country Philosopher) is a dramma giocoso per musica in 3 acts by composer Baldassare Galuppi. The opera uses an Italian language libretto by Carlo Goldoni. The work premiered at the Teatro San Samuele in Venice on 26 October 1754.

Il filosofo di campagna, which has been defined a "masterly opera", obtained a great success, with many performances throughout Europe.

== Roles ==
Roles, voice types, premiere cast
Roles	Voice type	Premiere cast, 26 October 1754
Eugenia, daughter of Don Tritemio, unmarried	soprano	Giovannina Baglioni
Rinaldo, nobleman, in love with Eugenia	soprano	Angela Conti-Leonardi
Nardo, rich farmer, known as "the Philosopher"	bass	Francesco Baglioni
Lesbina, housemaid of Don Tritemio	soprano	Clementina Baglioni
Don Tritemio, coming from the city and lodging in the village	bass	Francesco Carattoli
Lena, niece of Nardo	soprano	Anna Zanini
Capocchio, notary of the village	tenor	Giacomo Caldinelli

== Synopsis ==
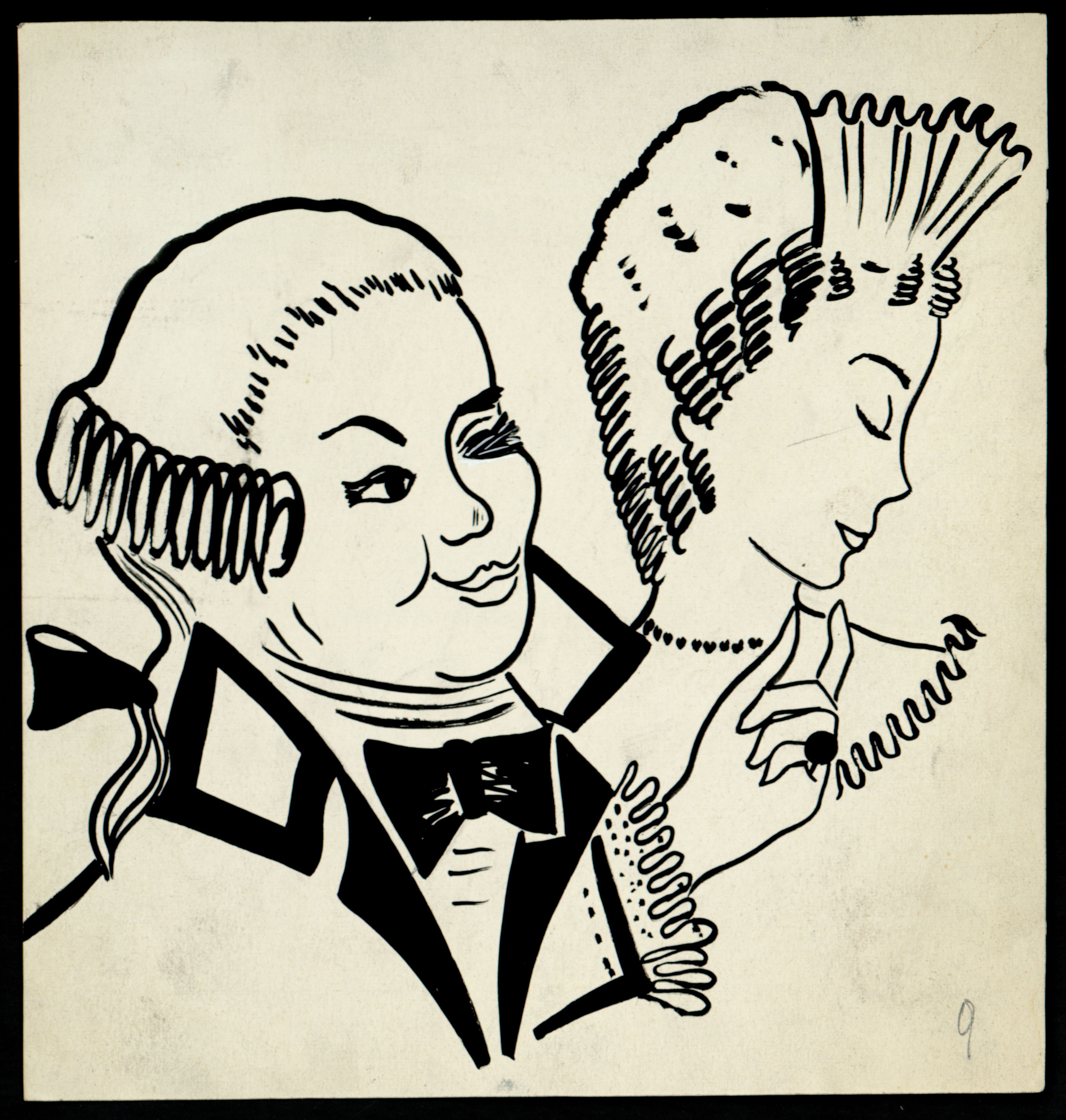
Drawing for a libretto (undated)

Tritemio wants his daughter Eugenia to marry Nardo, a rich farmer, known as "the Philosopher", but Eugenia is in love with the nobleman Rinaldo. Lesbina, housemaid of Tritemio, in order to avoid that Nardo meets Eugenia, takes the place of the girl. Nardo, who has never seen Eugenia before, ends up falling in love with Lesbina, convinced that she is the true daughter of Tritemio.

After a series of misunderstandings, Nardo learns of the true identity of Lesbina, but he accepts the housemaid all the same and remains in love with her.

Lesbina persuades Tritemio that she wants to marry him and a notary is called. When the notary arrives, without Tritemio knowing it, a double wedding is celebrated, between Nardo and Lesbina and between Rinaldo and Eugenia. Tritemio has to resign himself to the situation, but he finds his consolation marrying Lena, a niece of Nardo.

== Recordings ==
Year	Cast: Eugenia, Rinaldo, Nardo, Lesbina, Don Tritemio	Conductor, opera house and orchestra	Label
1956	Anna Moffo, Florindo Andreolli, Rolando Panerai, Elena Rizzieri, Mario Petri	Renato Fasano, I Virtuosi di Roma	Audio CD: Testament, Cat: TES 1195
2001	Paola Antonucci, Patrizio Saudelli, Alessandro Calamai, Patrizia Cigna, Giorgio Gatti	Francesco Piva, Intermusicale Ensemble	Audio CD: Bongiovanni, Cat: GB 2256/8-2
