= The Panel =

The Panel may refer to:

- The Panel (Australian TV series)
- The Panel (Irish TV series)

== See also ==
- Panel (disambiguation)
