= Antonio Lotti =

Italian composer (1667–1740)

- Born: 5 January 1667; Venice
- Died: 5 January 1740 (aged 73)
- Occupation: composer
- Spouse: Santa Stella
- Father: Matteo

Antonio Lotti (5 January 1667 – 5 January 1740) was an Italian composer of the Baroque era.

== Biography ==
Lotti was born in Venice, although his father Matteo was Kapellmeister at Hanover at the time. Oral tradition says that in 1682, Lotti began studying with Lodovico Fuga and Giovanni Legrenzi, both of whom were employed at St Mark's Basilica, Venice's principal church, although there is no documentary evidence.

=== Venice ===
Lotti made his career at St Mark's, first as an alto singer (from 1689), then as assistant to the second organist, then as second organist (from 1692), then (from 1704) as first organist, and finally (from 1736) as maestro di cappella, a position he held until his death.

Because of the paucity of solid scholarship until recent decades, older reference books cite a good deal of misinformation regarding Lotti's biography. Cicogna's 1834 Delle inscrizioni Veneziane and Francesco Caffi’s 1854 Storia della Musica relied on oral tradition more than a century old to name works that Lotti supposedly composed for the Ospedale degl’ Incurabili.

Later studies built upon that assertion to name Lotti as one of the supposed maestri of the Incurabili. The 2001 New Grove Dictionary of Music and Musicians went a step further to try to extrapolate when Lotti's period of employment at the Incurabili would supposedly have been, building on a house of cards.

However, recent studies establish that there is no documentary evidence whatsoever of any such employment ever taking place. The most current and most comprehensive studies by Caroline Giron-Panel and Pier Gillio establish conclusively that Lotti was not formally employed by the Incurabili, and that there is no evidence of his having composed any music for that institution, even on informal terms.

According to one nineteenth-century biographer, Lotti was a notable teacher, with Domenico Alberti, Benedetto Marcello, Giovanni Battista Pescetti, Baldassare Galuppi, Giuseppe Saratelli and Jan Dismas Zelenka among those believed to have been his pupils, although evidence is lacking in some cases. He was married to the noted soprano Santa Stella.

What is indeed well-documented is Lotti's employment at various other Venetian institutions, including the Scuola dello Spirito Santo, one of the scuole piccole. The governing body of the scuola, the Provveditori di Comun, contracted Antonio Lotti in 1695 to provide music at the scuola for the annual feast of Pentecost and the two days after for total of at least eight years. More significantly, he redistributed the balance between singers and instrumentalists in a way that reflects a change of musical texture and style in the sacred music performed there.

In 1717, he was given leave to go to Dresden.

=== Dresden ===
There is one more venue for which Lotti is known to have composed sacred music, namely, the Dresden court of Friedrich Augustus I, Elector of Saxony) where Lotti was in residence from 1717 to 1719. While in Venice, the king had engaged Lotti specifically to compose for the Italian opera troupe that he had assembled. But the Electorate seemed to have gone to lengths to keep the visiting Italians away from the resident chapel musicians, particularly from Kapellmeister Johann Christoph Schmidt.

“The king also authorized some appointments only under the condition “that this not disturb anything among the orchestra.” The electoral prince was even forced, when the Italians were already in Dresden, to declare outright in a letter to the Count [Christian Heinrich von Watzdorf, minister of domestic affairs] that he would take [the Italians] into his special protection and protect them against any ill will... “about which, the King has declared that His Majesty will afford them every possible protection, whatever it takes, that [Court Chapel master Johann Christoph Schmidt] should have no business with them.”

In Dresden, he also composed operas, including Giove in Argo, Teofane and Li quattro elementi (all with librettos by Antonio Maria Lucchini). Other works written in Venice include Giustino; Trionfo dell'Innocenza; the first act of Tirsi, Achille Placato, Teuzzone, Ama più che non si crede, Il comando inteso e tradito, Sidonio, Isaccio tiranno, La forze de sangue, Il Tradimento traditore di sé stesso, L'Infedeltà punita, Poresenna, Irene Augusta, Polidoro, Foca superbo, Alessandro Severo, Il Vincitore Generossi and Odii del Sangue delusi.

=== Return to Venice ===
He returned to his job at San Marco in Venice in 1719 and remained there until his death in 1740.

== Compositions ==
Missa (4v. C maj) - Kyrie

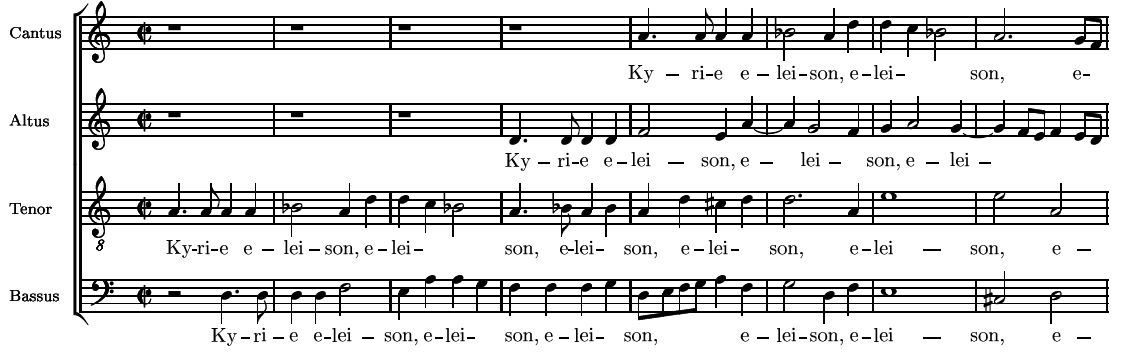
Part from the Missa Brevis by Antonio Lotti

Lotti wrote in a variety of forms, producing masses, cantatas, madrigals, around thirty operas, and instrumental music. Some of his sacred choral works are unaccompanied (a cappella) but many of them are composed in the concertato style with strings, basso continuo, and occasionally oboes and trumpets. His more progressive works foreshadow the galant style, considered a transition between the established Baroque and emerging Classical styles.

Johann Sebastian Bach, George Frideric Handel, and Jan Dismas Zelenka all had copies of Lotti's Missa Sapientiae, a Kyrie–Gloria Mass (Kyrie in G minor, Gloria in G major).

No longer attributed to Lotti:

- The Magnificat in C major, BWV Anh. 30 used to be attributed to Lotti, but appears to have been composed by Pietro Torri.
- The Kyrie–Gloria Mass for double choir, BWV Anh. 167, for which Lotti was suggested as composer in the second half of the 19th century, an attribution that was thought possible until the late 20th century, has more recently been attributed to other composers.

== Sources ==
- Bitter, Karl Hermann (1865). "F. Die lateinischen kurzen Messen" [F. The Latin short masses]. Johann Sebastian Bach (in German). Vol. II (1st ed.). Berlin: Schneider. pp. 111–134.
- Dürr, Alfred; Kobayashi, Yoshitake, eds. (1998). Bach Werke Verzeichnis: Kleine Ausgabe – Nach der von Wolfgang Schmieder vorgelegten 2. Ausgabe [Bach Works Catalogue: Small Edition – After Wolfgang Schmieder's 2nd edition] (in German). Kirsten Beißwenger (collaborator). (BWV^{2a} ed.). Wiesbaden: Breitkopf & Härtel. ISBN 978-3-7651-0249-3. Preface in English and German.
- Spitta, Philipp (1880). Johann Sebastian Bach (in German). Vol. II. Leipzig: Breitkopf & Härtel.
- Torri, Pietro (2013). Thielemann, Arne (ed.). Magnificat in C: BWV Anh. 30. Stuttgarter Bach-Ausgaben. Vol. Full score. Bach, Johann Sebastian (arranger); Horn, Paul (basso continuo realization). Stuttgart: Carus. 35.012.
- Wolff, Christoph (1968). Stile antico in der Musik Johann Sebastian Bachs: Studien zu Bachs Spätwerk [Stile antico in the music of Johann Sebastian Bach: Studies on Bach's late work]. Beihefte zum Archiv für Musikwissenschaft (in German). Vol. VI. Wiesbaden: Steiner. OCLC 651793960.
- Wollny, Peter (2015). "Vom „apparat der auserleßensten kirchen Stücke" zum „Vorrath an Musicalien, von J. S. Bach und andern berühmten Musicis": Quellenkundliche Ermittlungen zur frühen Thüringer Bach-Überlieferung und zu einigen Weimarer Schülern und Kollegen Bachs". Bach-Jahrbuch 2015 [Bach Yearbook 2015]. Bach-Jahrbuch (in German). Vol. 101. Neue Bachgesellschaft. Leipzig: Evangelische Verlagsanstalt. ISBN 978-3-374-04320-0. ISSN 0084-7682.
