= L'inimico delle donne =

Opera by Baldassare Galuppi

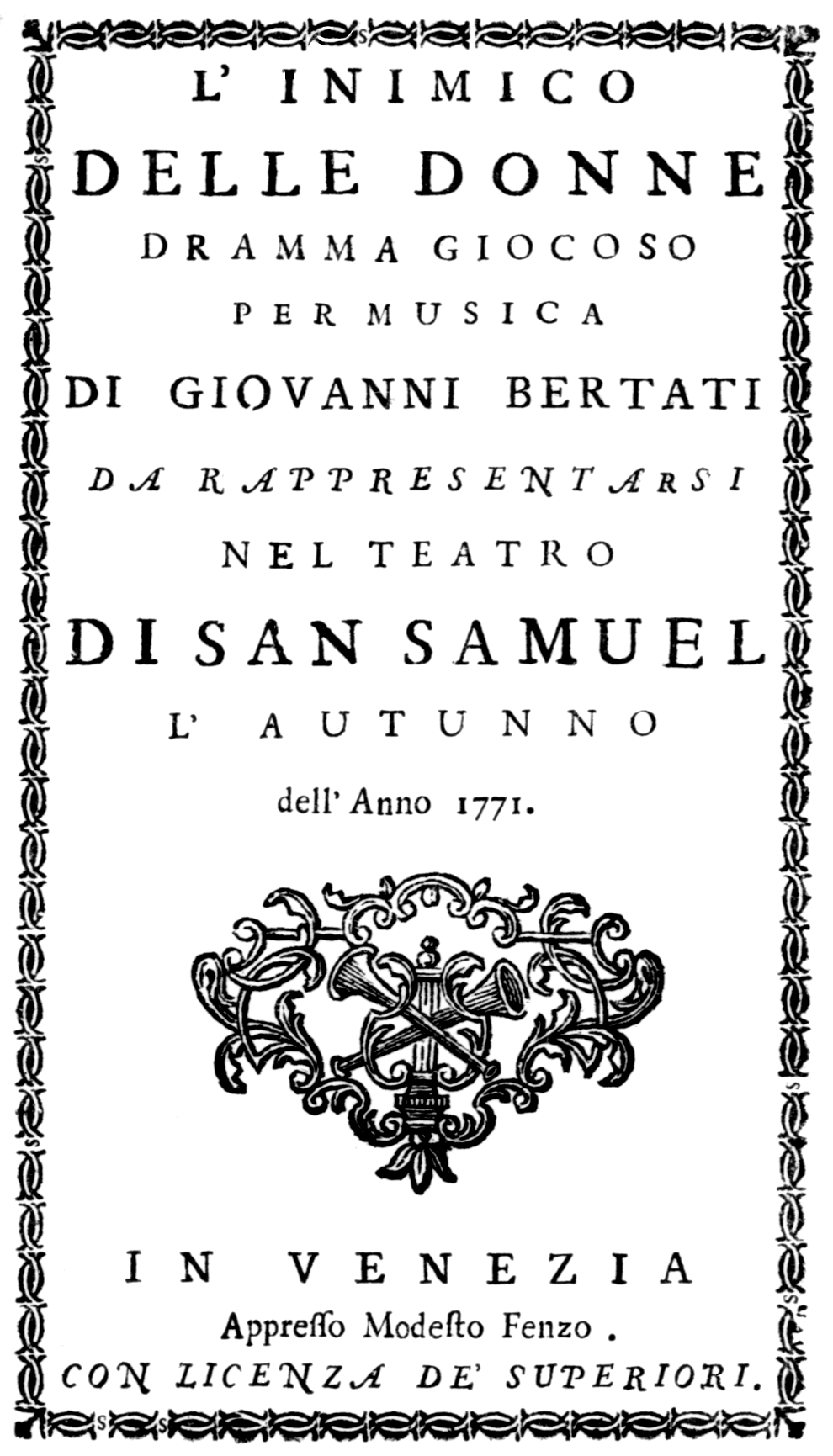
Baldassare Galuppi - L'inimico delle donne - title page of the libretto - Venice 1771

L'inimico delle donne (The Enemy of Women) is an Italian-language comic opera in 3 acts by Baldassare Galuppi to a libretto by Giovanni Bertati. It was Galuppi's first collaboration with Bertali, and premiered autumn 1771 Venice, at the Teatro San Samuele. The opera ran for 10 years. A modern revival directed by Stefano Mazzonis di Pralafera was given in February 2011 at the Opera de Wallonie, Liège.

== Cast ==
- Agnesina, an Italian girl, soprano
- Zon-Zon, emperor of China, tenor
- Geminiano, baritono
- Xunchia, soprano
- Ly-lam, tenor
- Kam-si, soprano
- Si-sin, baritono
- Zyda, mezzo-soprano
- strings, 2 oboes, 2 cornettos, bassoon, harpsichord

== Recordings ==
- DVD, Filippo Adami, Anna Maria Panzarella, Alberto Rinaldi, Opera Royal de Wallonie Orchestra. Rinaldo Alessandrini Dynamic
