= Bonaventura Furlanetto =

Italian composer (1738–1817)

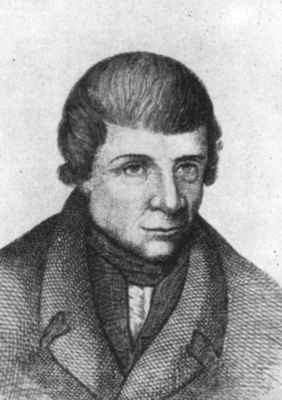

Bonaventura Furlanetto (27 May 1738 - 6 April 1817) was an Italian composer and music teacher, also known in his lifetime by the nickname Musin. His pupils included Anselmo Marsand and Giovanni Pacini.

== Life ==
Born in Venice, he spent his childhood in the parish of San Nicolò dei Mendicoli, where he learned music almost completely self-taught except for some lessons from his amateur organist uncle Nicolò Formenti and the priest Giacopo Bolla. At the same time, he was also taught philosophy and literature by Jesuits. He then embarked on an ecclesiastical career, but declined to be ordained.

In 1762, he produced a 'Laudate Dominum', probably his earliest (or at least earliest surviving) work. The following year he produced the religious composition La sposa de' sacri cantici, produced at the oratory of San Filippo Neri in Venice in 1767, 1773 and 1784. His oratorio Giubilo celeste al giungervi della sant'anima was equally successful, being produced at the Basilica dei Santi Giovanni e Paolo on 16 May 1765, 1766 and 1767, where it excited audiences with its typically opera buffa style. In 1767, Furlanetto followed it with music for the Santa Maria della Visitazione choir at Basilica di Santa Maria della Salute (better known as La Pietà), which on 21 September 1768 made him its maestro di cappella, a role he held there for fifty years. In the same year, he also produced a number of works for the ceremonies on 20 July 1768, marking Girolamo Miani's canonisation.

In 1774, Furlanetto applied to become vicemaestro di cappella at St Mark's Basilica, but was beaten to that role by Ferdinando Bertoni. Whilst Bertoni was away on a trip to London between 1781 and 1783, Furlanetto was made additional organist and stood in for him provisionally as titular organist. On 18 December 1794, he was made provisional vicemaestro provvisorio and on 23 December 1797 substantive or effective vicemaestro. Finally on Bertoni's death on 11 June 1808, he became maestro of the Basilica, perhaps only provisionally at first, since the first official mention of him in that role was in the Gazzetta privilegiata di Venezia of 10 April 1817, which stated he had been appointed to the post in 1814. He held the post until his death in Venice in 1817.

From the early 19th century onwards, Furlanetto became famous throughout northern Italy as one of Venice's most important sacred composers. In 1811, he was anonymously elected master of counterpoint to the 40 amateur musicians who made up Venice's Istituto Filarmonico. During this period, he may have written a treatise mentioned by Francesco Caffi, but his only surviving theoretical work is his 1789 Lezioni di contrappunto.

== Analysis ==
The English music historian Charles Burney heard Furlanetto direct some of his works at the Pietà in August 1770, stating that his "composition and execution do not exceed the mediocre". On 14 August that year, Burney was favourably impressed by some Furlanetto music put on in Santa Maria Celeste, so much so that he decided to return the following day for the Assumption service, but he was again disappointed and stated "this composer's resources are very few; also he has little fire and still less variety ... I must confess that to me his music is tiring and leaves behind languor and dissatisfaction". Burney added that the composer Baldassare Galuppi, who he had met in Venice, "felt quite offended in encouraging and protecting several ecclesiastical "donkeys", including Furlanetto". In contrast, the Italian musicologist Francesco Caffi stated in his treatise Della vita e del comporre di Bonaventura Furlanetto that Galuppi respected Furlanetto and encouraged him to complete his own masses.

From the early 1770s and throughout the 1780s, Furlanetto's musical talent became more developed, as seen in his revisions to his own earlier oratorios and in his use of additional orchestral resources, opting not just for the standard combination of stringed and wind instruments but also adding contrabassoons, contralto trombones, serpents, French double horns and percussion such as tympani, tambourines, bells, rattles and sistra.

== Selected works ==
All his autograph musical manuscripts were collected by his friend Antonio Rota, a priest at San Vitale, Venice, and are now held at Venice's Conservatorio Benedetto Marcello and Biblioteca nazionale Marciana.

=== Religious ===
==== Oratorios ====
All his oratorios were first produced in Venice.

- La sposa de' sacri cantici (1763)
- Protomartire Giovanni Nepomuceno (1765)
- De nativitate virginis genethliacon (1770)
- Moyses in Nilo (1771)
- Felix victori (1773)
- Jaelis victoria (1773)
- Athalia (1773)
- Templi reparatio (1774)
- David in Siceleg (1776)
- Israelis liberatio (1777)
- Reditus exercitus Israelistici postcladem Philistaeorum (1777)
- Mors Adam (1777)
- Nabot (1778)
- Somnium Pharaonis (1779)
- De filio prodigo (1779)
- Dies extrema mundi (1780)
- David Goliath triumphator (1780)
- Jonathas (1781)
- Salomon rex Israel electus (1782)
- Aurea statua a rege Nabucodonosor erecta vel pueri Hebraei in fornace ardentis ignis (1783)
- Prudens Abiga (1784)
- Moyses ad Rubum (1785)
- Absalonis rebellio (1785)
- Sisara (1786)
- Abraham et Isach (1786)
- De solemni Baltassar convivio (1787)
- Judith triumphans (1787)
- De solemni nuptiae in domum Lebani (1788)
- Triumphus Jephte (1789)
- Bethulia liberata (based on Betulia liberata by Pietro Metastasio, 1790)
- Gedeon (1792)
- De filio prodigo (1800)
- Primum fatale homicidium (1800)
- Il trionfo di Iefte (1801)
- Tabia (attribution doubtful)

==== Cantatas ====
- Melior fiducia vos ergo (for soprano, contralto and orchestra, 1775)
- Quisnam felicior me? (for soprano, contralto and orchestra, 1780)
- In coelo resplendent (for soprano, contralto and orchestra, 1785)
- Alma letitie dies (for soprano, contralto and orchestra, 1789)
- Cantata duodecima (for soprano, contralto and orchestra, 1791)
- Nuptie Rachelis (for soprano, contralto and orchestra, 1795)
- Musica per le tre ore dell'agonia di Nostro Signore Gesù Cristo (for 2 tenors, bass and cello, 1801)
- Veritas de terra orta est (for 5 voices, 1810)
- Sponsia mantis caro (for 5 cori and 5 orchestras)
- Sumo furis regulia venus dies jucundum (for 2 choirs and 2 orchestras)
- Fugitava quis ploras anima (for soprano, contralto and orchestra)
- Vitae calamitates (for soprano, contralto e orchestra, perhaps an adaptation of Fugitava)

== Bibliography ==
- (in Italian) F. Caffi: Della vita e del comporre di Bonaventura Furlanetto (Venice, 1820)
- (in Italian) B. Gamba: Galleria dei letterati ed artisti illustri delle provincie Veneziane nel secolo XVIII (Venice, 1824)
- (in Italian) S. dalla Libera: Cronologia musicale della Basilica di San Marco in Venezia, Musica sacra (Milan, 1961)
- D. and E. Arnold: The Oratorio in Venice (London, 1986)
