= Peter Seivewright =

Peter Seivewright (born 1954 in Skipton, England) is a British pianist. After music studies at Oxford, he was a post-graduate student at the Royal Northern College of Music in Manchester, where he studied piano with Ryszard Bakst.

== Work with Galuppi's sonatas ==
Although he has released several recordings, including discs of Carl Nielsen, Victor Bendix, and Louis Glass, he is perhaps most known for his current endeavour to record all 90 of the keyboard sonatas of Baldassare Galuppi for The Divine Art record company. This has involved him in personally researching manuscripts of Galuppi's sonatas in Venice, and reportedly in editing and publishing them in due course as well.

Reviews of Seivewright's Galuppi have been varied. Some have been impressed by Galuppi's sonatas themselves, using Domenico Scarlatti as a benchmark with one reviewer calling them "far more appealing than Scarlatti sonatas,"; others have made the same comparison to Galuppi's detriment ("the individual pieces lack the character and sparkling invention so typical of Scarlatti").

Seivewright's playing has also been evaluated variously, with many reviewers applauding it. Reviewer Gerald Fenech terms him "an enthusiastic and technically accomplished pianist" who "plays with great conviction and flair in all the sonatas presented here." Kevin Sutton, however, complains that "The halting playing, lack of line tension and the image that I was listening to a pianist playing over, rather than through a composer continually disturbed me. (Glenn Gould would have been proud.)"

== Work with modern composers ==
Seivewright has also been a champion of music by living composers, having performed Rory Boyle's piano concerto and "Moduli" (a series of piano pieces), and commissioning "A Saltire Sonata" from Robert Crawford. He also performed Martin Dalby's score for the ten-minute film for schoolchildren "Let's See: Winter."
