= La diavolessa =

Opera by Baldassare Galuppi

- Opera by Baldassare Galuppi
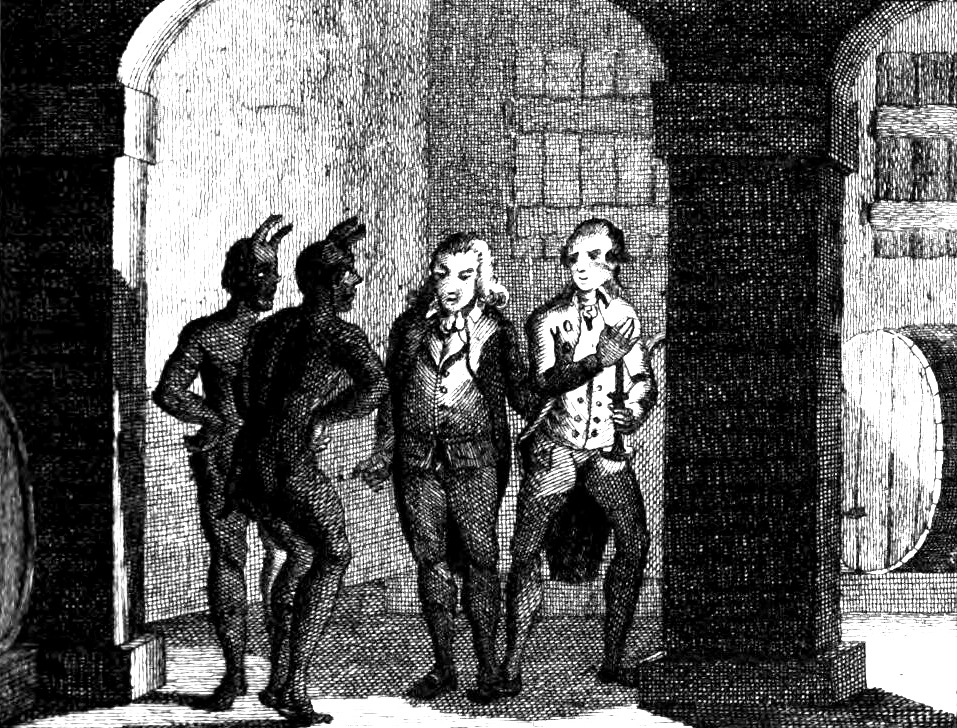
- Illustration from the 1795 publication of Goldoni's libretto
- Librettist: Carlo Goldoni
- Language: Italian
- Premiere: November 1755; Teatro San Samuele, Venice

La diavolessa (The She-devil) is an opera (dramma giocoso) in 3 acts by Baldassare Galuppi. The Italian-language libretto was by Carlo Goldoni. It premiered in November 1755 at the Teatro San Samuele, Venice.

Act 2 Finale has been indicated as "the most notable section of the opera", thanks to its capacity "to evoke mysterious powers through musical imageries", with "orchestral accompaniment continuous and rhythmically assertive". Arias have been judged "lively and with charming melodic ideas".

== Roles ==
Role	Voice type	Premiere cast, November 1755
Count Nastri	contralto castrato	Giuseppe Celesti
The Countess, his wife	soprano	Antonia Zamperini
Dorina, adventuress	contralto	Serafina Penni
Giannino, young, lover of Dorina	bass	Giovanni Leonardi
Don Poppone Corbelli, gentleman	bass	Michele Del Zanca
Ghiandina, housemaid	soprano	Rosa Puccini
Falco, innkeeper	tenor	Giovanni Lovatini
Gabrino, servant, not speaking		

== Synopsis ==
=== Act 1 ===
Giannino and Dorina are in love, but Dorina doesn't want to marry Giannino because he is poor. (Duet: Ho risolto, voglio andar / "I have decided, I want to go") Falco proposes a way to gain some money. Poppone is a credulous man who is always in search for treasures: deceiving him will be very easy. Falco is sure that the marriage between Giannino and Dorina will take place (Cavatina a 3: Se non fossi maritato / "If I were not married").

Count Nastri and his wife live in the inn of Falco, but the Countess wants to leave because she is jealous of Dorina. Don Poppone offers them the possibility to move in his house. The Countess declares that a man has to treat his wife with temperance, not as a slave (Aria: S'inganna chi crede / "Deceives himself, the man who believes the woman is his slave"). Poppone thinks continuously to a treasure that he is convinced is buried in the cellar of his house and is therefore annoyed by the forthcoming arrival of the Count and the Countess, that he does not know personally and will host to do a favour to a friend of his. The servant Ghiandina, allured by the idea of the treasure, offers to Poppone her undying faith, hoping to become his wife (Aria: Una donna che apprezza il decoro / "A woman who observes the properties").

Giannino and Dorina arrive in the house of Poppone, who believes they are the Count and the Countess. Giannino and Dorina think that this has been organized by Falco and adapt to the situation, but Poppone is surprised by their strange habits (Aria: Si distingue dal nobil il vile / "A nobleman distinguishes himself from a humble"). Giannino mentions the treasure but Poppone, convinced that someone has revealed the secret to the Count, denies decidedly that any treasure is hidden in his house (Aria: Chi v'ha detto del tesoro / "If someone told you about the treasure"). Giannino is confused (Aria: Colle dame, colle dame / "With the women, with the women").

Falco, unaware that Giannino has already been welcomed as the Count, would like to prepare the appearance of his accomplices and announces to Poppone that a Turkish couple, in search for a treasure, is about to arrive. Falco says to Poppone that the Turks are sure to find a huge fortune in his house. (Aria: Il cielo vi precipiti / "Heaven will throw golden lightnings") Falco leaves and immediately the Count and the Countess appear. Poppone thinks they are the Turks announced by Falco and treats them as low rank people. After the initial disconcertment, however, the Count decides to forgive Poppone to honour his higher social standing. (Aria: Tenta invan co' suoi vapori / "In vain attempts the Earth with its clouds").

Poppone meets again the supposed Count and his wife and is attracted by the beauty of Dorina. Further suspects and misunderstandings arise. (Finale: Conte mio, per tutti i titoli / "My dear Count, for all your titles")

=== Act 2 ===
The Countess has seen Dorina and her jealousy overcomes her again; she is angry with Poppone for the boorish treatment received (Aria: Chi son io, pensate prima / "Before, think about who I am"). When the Countess leaves, Poppone speaks with the Count about the treasure in the cellar and reveals his attraction for Dorina; the Count panders to the strange behaviour of Poppone (Aria: Un tenero affetto / "A tender feeling").

Falco advises Poppone to pay in advance the Turks for their help in discovering the treasure. Falco meets then Dorina and realizes that Poppone thinks she is the Countess; he advises Dorina to try to wangle as much as possible out of Poppone and for himself asks only a benign glance (Aria: Se con quell'occhio moro / "If with your brown eye").

Dorina and Giannino meet Poppone with a precious ring and a purse full of money; they are convinced that Poppone will offer them the ring and the purse as a reward for searching the treasure, but the Count and the Countess appear and Poppone gives the gifts to these latter. The supposed Turks get offended and leave. Dorina and Giannino console Poppone and convince him to give them the ring and the purse (Aria: M'han lasciato in testamento / "I inherited from my forebears"). Left alone with Dorina, Poppone makes advances to her, but Dorina, singing a Venetian song, replies that love is a very serious matter and leaves (Aria: Sior omo generoso / "My noble Sir").

Poppone is astonished by the events and his surprise increases when Ghiandina announces that she wants to leave the house because she has realized that Poppone is in love with the Countess. Ghiandina however hopes to conquer again the love of Poppone (Aria: Donne belle, che bramate / "Nice women, who desire").

Falco and Poppone meet again in the cellar. Poppone expects that the Turks will come to help him to find the treasure. Instead Dorina and Giannino appear, disguised as devils. They terrify Poppone, give him a good beating and force him to dig in vain in search of the treasure. Finally, Dorina and Giannino leave, while Poppone wishes long life to the devils (Finale: Spiriti erranti... / "Wandering spirits").

=== Act 3 ===
Poppone meets the Count and the Countess, intending to ask them for an explanation of the events of the cellar. During the discussion the truth emerges and Poppone realizes that they are not Turks but the guests sent by his friend (Aria: Com'è stato dir non so / "I don't know to explain how it happened") However, the Count and the Countess decide to leave immediately (Aria: Più bel diletto / "Better delight").

Ghiandina announces to Dorina and Giannino that they have been discovered and claims again that she will become the wife of Poppone (Aria: Sì signori, così è / "Yes, it is like this"). Dorina and Giannino are ready to flee, but Falco appears and announces that the father of Giannino is died, leaving to Giannino a large fortune. Falco advises to apologize to Poppone for the deception and the beating (Aria: Veleggiar secondo il vento / "A sailor has to sail following the wind"). Giannino is sad for the death of his father, and Dorina for abandoning her mother, but both are sure to find consolation in the love (Duet: Oh povero mio padre / "My poor father").

Falco explains everything to Poppone. He forgives Dorina and Giannino and accepts to marry Ghiandina (Finale: Spiriti buoni, qua comparite / "Appear, kindly spirits").

== Recordings ==
2003: Wolfgang Katschner, Lautten Compagney Berlin, CPO Cat. 999 947-2

Count Nastri: Johnny Maldondo
Countess Nastri: Bettina Pahn
Dorina: Kremena Dilcheva
Giannino: Matthias Vieweg

Don Poppone: Egbert Junghanns
Ghiandina: Doerthe Maria Sandmann
Falco: Tom Allen
