= Gustavo primo, re di Svezia =

Opera by Baldassare Galuppi

- Opera by Baldassare Galuppi
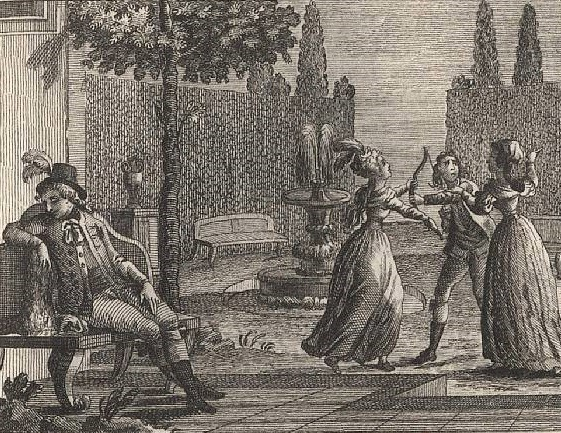
- Illustration from the 1794 publication of Goldoni's libretto
- Librettist: Carlo Goldoni
- Language: Italian
- Premiere: 25 May 1740; Teatro San Samuele, Venice

Gustavo primo, re di Svezia (Gustavus the First, King of Sweden) is a three act opera seria by Baldassare Galuppi, with a libretto by Carlo Goldoni, fictionalising events in the life of Gustav I of Sweden. Composed in honour of the Genoese nobleman marchese Giovanni Giacomo Grimaldi, it premiered on 25 May 1740 at Venice's Teatro San Samuele. It was first recorded in 2003 by Edit Károly, Mónika Gonzalez, Mario Cecchetti, Gabriella Létai Kiss, Filippo Pina Castiglioni, and the Savaria Baroque Orchestra, conducted by Fabio Pirona.

== Premiere cast ==
Roles, voice types (uncertain), premiere cast
Role	Voice type (Note: Voice types are uncertain; Basteris has also been described as 'tenor'.)	Premiere cast, 25 May 1740
Ernesto, senator of the capital of Sweden and governor of the province of Dalarna	bass	Gaetano Pompeo Basteris
Ergilda, Ernesto's daughter, lover of Learco	soprano (?)	Maria Camatti
Learco, a foreign stranger (later discovered to be Gustavo), lover of Ergilda and Dorisbe	castrato soprano	Lorenzo Girardi
Argeno, Ernesto's son, lover of Dorisbe	contralto (?) en travesti	Eleonora Ferandini
Dorisbe, disguised, later discovered to be Clotilde, Gustavo's cousin and lover	mezzo-soprano (?)	Marianna Imer
Soldiers, Archers, Commoners

== Historical context ==
After Sweden's various vicissitudes, Christian II of Denmark was so completely overwhelmed that no hope of liberty seemed to remain. The people solved this by electing a king of their own nation, who would be only the first magistrate of the republic and preferable to laws imposed on them. But Christian the conqueror thought to gain absolute dominion, making it impossible for those most zealous for their native freedom. Therefore, fearing revolution in a conquered land, after sacrificing most of the royal families, taken hostage four of the kingdom's main lords, including young Gustav, son of Henry, of the illustrious Vasa family, which had often held the throne, and imprisoned them in Denmark. Heaven, which had destined him to be his homeland's liberator, freed him from his prison thanks to the people of Lübeck, who then spread the false rumour that he had fled in disguise in a storm to spy out his enemy's forces. Instead they hid him in the province of Dalarna, which was subject to Sweden but did not want to recognise its conqueror as its sovereign. Gustav grew to adulthood known to himself but unknown to others, becoming great in valour and bravery, so that the people elected him their leader and – after defeating his enemies – elected him their king, acknowledging the man who the people of Lübeck called Gustav Ericson, the first king of that name, who was the hero of the North in the 16th century and the first king to become so by popular assent (Abbé Vertot, Puffendorf, Varillas, etc).

— Carlo Goldoni, from the libretto to Gustavo primo, re di Svezia
