= Le gelosie villane =

- Dramma giocoso by Giuseppe Sarti
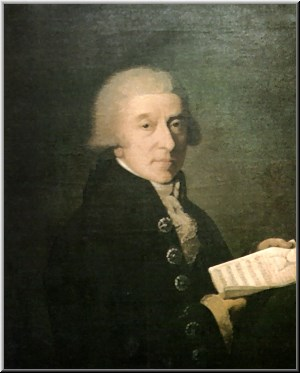
- Giuseppe Sarti
- Librettist: Tommaso Grandi
- Language: Italian
- Premiere: November 1776; Teatro San Samuele in Venice

Le gelosie villane ("Peasant Jealousies") is a dramma giocoso in three acts by Giuseppe Sarti. The libretto was by Tommaso Grandi. It was also known as Il feudatorio, Il feudatorio burlato and I contadini bizzari. It was also set by Pasquale Anfossi.

== Performance history ==
It was first performed at the Teatro San Samuele in Venice in November 1776. Like many of Sarti's other operas, it was extremely popular and was regularly produced during the last quarter of the 18th century. It was given at the Burgtheater in Vienna from 8 October 1777 and in Livorno from 26 December the same year. The first performance in London was at the King's Theatre on 15 April 1784.

== Roles ==
Cast	Voice type	Premiere, November 1776 (Conductor:Unknown)
The Marquis	tenor	
Giannina	soprano	
Tognino	baritone	
Sandrina	soprano	
Oliverra	soprano	
Nardo	bass	
Mengone	bass	
Cecchino	bass	

== Synopsis ==
The opera is a satire about the amorous relationships between a marquis and a number of peasant girls on his estate.
