= Francesco Carattoli =

Italian opera singer

Francesco Carattoli (1704 or 1705 – March 1772) was an Italian bass buffo, or singer of opera buffa.

Carattoli was born in Rome, and began singing in the 1740s. He sang in a number of comic operas in various parts of Italy through the 1740s, 1750s, and early 1760s, by composers such as Gaetano Latilla, Baldassare Galuppi, Domenico Fischietti, and Niccolò Piccinni, both becoming prominent himself and helping to increase the popularity and prestige of opera buffa through his skillful performances. A number of the prominent comic opera bass roles of the 18th century were written for him, and his combination of voice and acting was much sought after.

In 1764, he went to Vienna to sing there. During the 1760s, Italian impresarios brought troupes of buffi to Vienna, and opera buffa become quite popular there. Carattoli was, along with Domenico Poggi, one of the most celebrated singers despite being in his 60s by that time, and gained praise from Johann Joseph von Khevenhüller-Metsch and Joseph von Sonnenfels, among others. He had roles written for him by prominent Viennese composers of opera buffa as well, including Florian Leopold Gassmann and Wolfgang Amadeus Mozart.
