= Jill Crossland =

British musician

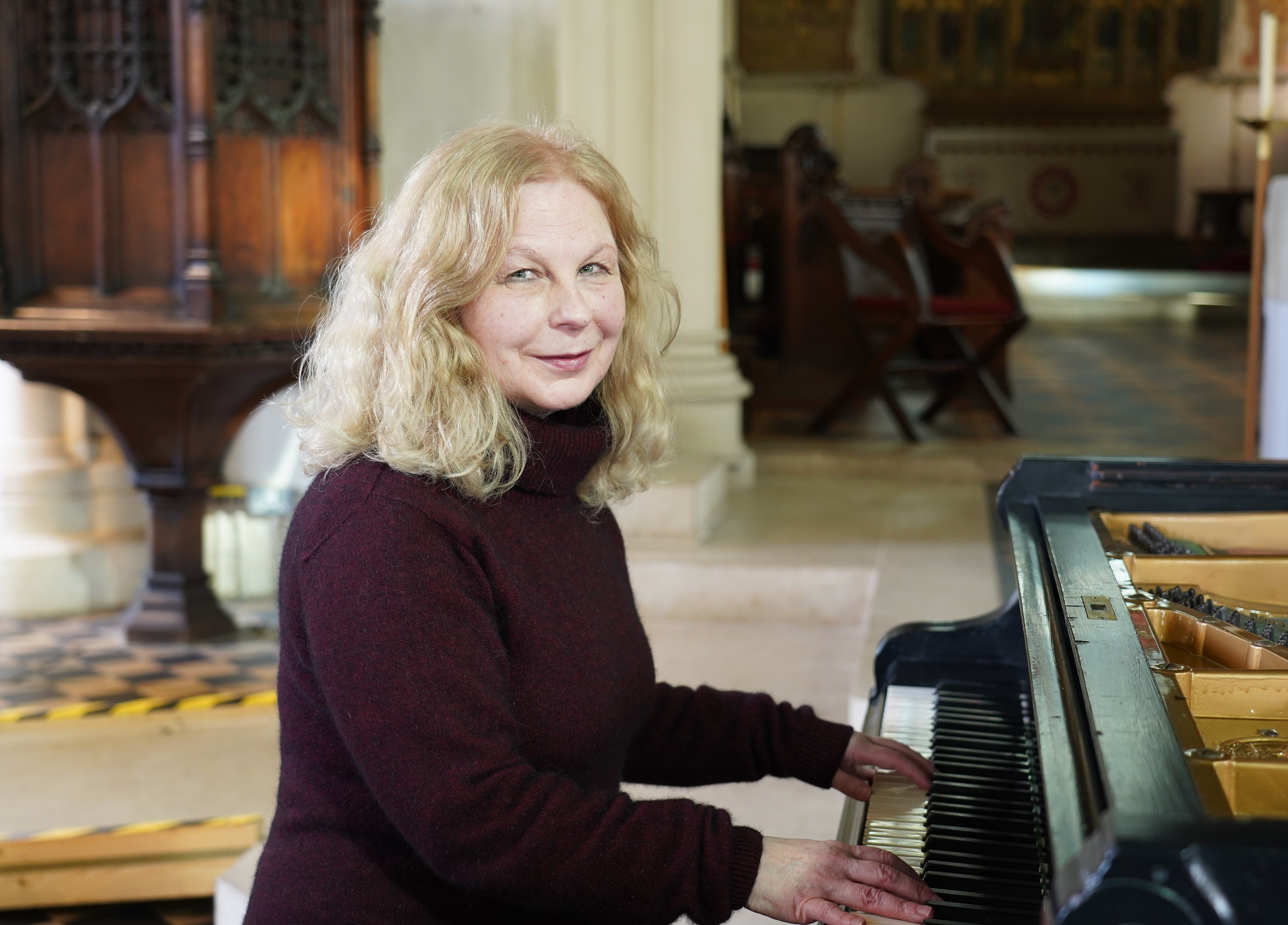
Portrait of Jill Crossland

Jill Crossland is an English pianist, born in Yorkshire. She studied with Ryszard Bakst (a Heinrich Neuhaus pupil) at Chetham's School of Music and the Royal Northern College of Music in Manchester, and with Paul Badura-Skoda in Vienna. She has a preference for Baroque and Classical periods of the repertoire, with a focus on the music by Johann Sebastian Bach, playing it on the piano. She has performed his Well-Tempered Clavier from memory since her student years.

Crossland made her Wigmore Hall solo debut in 2004. She recorded in 2003 Bach's English Suite No 2, BWV 807, Partita No 1, BWV 825, and his Chromatic Fantasia and Fugue, BWV 903. She also recorded his Goldberg Variations, and piano sonatas by Mozart and Beethoven. In 2005, she recorded works by Bach, Handel and Scarlatti on a historic fortepiano, built by Jirikowsky in 1824, at Restoration House in Rochester. She recorded Parts I and II of the Well-Tempered Clavier, and a reviewer of Gramophone noted in 2008 the "warm, rounded and perpetually singing sonority" of her playing.He described her approach as "intimately scaled and sensitively nuanced".
