= Lodovico Fuga =

Italian Baroque composer and organist

Lodovico Fuga (1643-1722) was an Italian Baroque composer and organist, mainly active in Venice, where he was a cantor at St Mark's Basilica. In 1680, he succeeded Gasparo Sartorio as organist at San Rocco, Venice, a post he held until his death and where he gained a pay raise to thirty-six ducats a year in 1692.

Oral tradition says that in 1682, Antonio Lotti became one of his pupils, although there is no documentary evidence. He may also have played a part in training Antonio Vivaldi.
