= Ryszard Bakst =

Polish pianist and piano teacher

Ryszard Bakst (4 April 1926 – 25 March 1999) was a Polish pianist and distinguished piano teacher.

== Background ==
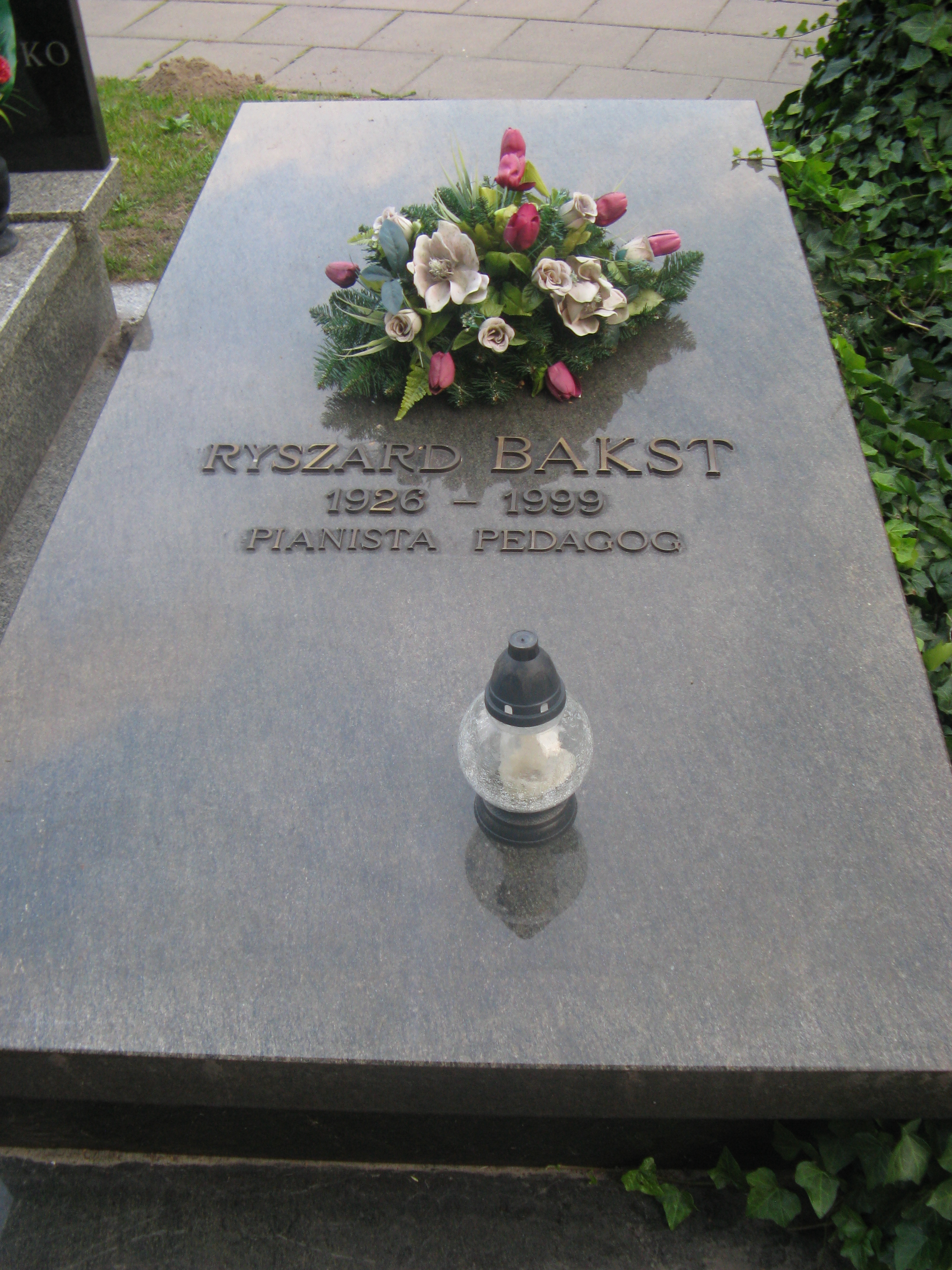
The grave of Ryszard Bakst at the Powązki Military Cemetery

Bakst was a descendant of the Russian artist Léon Bakst. His teachers were initially his mother and pianist Józef Turczyński, then Abram Lufer (who had won 4th Prize at the 1932 Chopin International Piano Competition) and later Konstantin Igumnov and Heinrich Neuhaus at the Moscow Conservatory, and finally with pianist Zbigniew Drzewiecki.

Bakst was a prize winner at the IV International Chopin Piano Competition in Warsaw in 1949 and performed in Europe and the United States the Far East and numerous other places around the world. He was particularly known for his interpretations of Chopin but also played composers as diverse as Aaron Copland and Juliusz Zarębski.

He immigrated to Great Britain in 1968 and did not return to Poland until 1988 when he appeared in a televised concert at the Warsaw Philharmonic Hall.

Among the gifted students he taught, according to Bakst himself, are Andrew Wilde and Pawel Skrzypek, and, for her complete Bach performances, Jill Crossland. Others whom Bakst held in high regard are Alicja Fiderkiewicz, Janusz Olejniczak and Ronan O'Hora, whilst the long list of other students includes the successful Paul Lewis as well as Marta Karbownicka, Graham Scott, Robyn Koh, Mark Anderson, Takahashi Yamamoto, Matthew Schellhorn, Peter Seivewright, Timothy Horton, David Moss and many others. He also gave lessons to popular music artists, such as Don Airey of Deep Purple.

In 2013, multiple allegations were made that Bakst had sexually abused students he taught at Chetham's School of Music.
