= Giannina e Bernardone =

- Dramma giocoso by Domenico Cimarosa
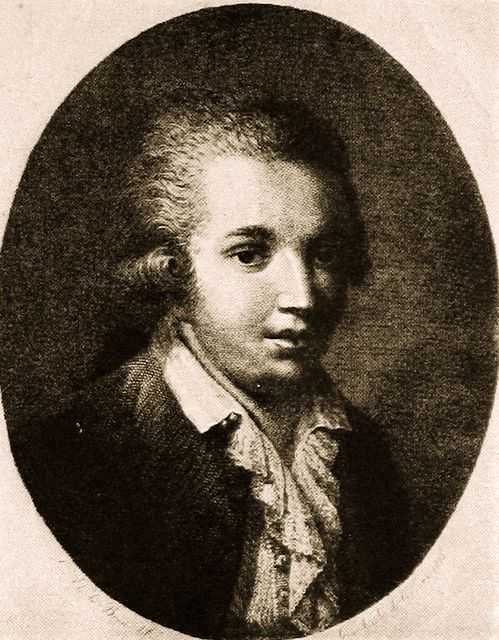
- The composer
- Librettist: Filippo Livigni
- Language: Italian
- Premiere: 1781; Teatro San Samuele, Venice

Giannina e Bernardone is a dramma giocoso in two acts by composer Domenico Cimarosa with an Italian libretto by Filippo Livigni. The opera premiered in the autumn of 1781 at the Teatro San Samuele in Venice. A portion of the work was performed again in 1786 in Venice in the form of an intermezzo entitled Il villano geloso.

It had its London premiere at the King's Theatre in Haymarket in 1787.

== Roles ==
Role	Voice type	Premiere cast, Autumn 1781 (Conductor: - )
Giannina	soprano	
Masino	tenor	
Bernardone	bass	
Lauretta	soprano	
il capitano Francone	tenor	
Don Orlando	bass	
Donna Aurora	mezzo-soprano	
friends, servants, soldiers, the military band, neighbors

== Recording ==
- 1953 - Sena Jurinac (Giannina), Sesto Bruscantini (Bernardone), Graziella Sciutti (Lauretta), Disma de Ceco (Donna Aurora), Mario Carlin (Capitano Francone), Mario Borriello (Don Orlando), Carlo de Antonio (Masino)
  Coro e Orchestra della RAI di Milano, Nino Sanzogno (conductor) - Andromeda (2 CDs)
