= Francesco Caffi =

Italian composer

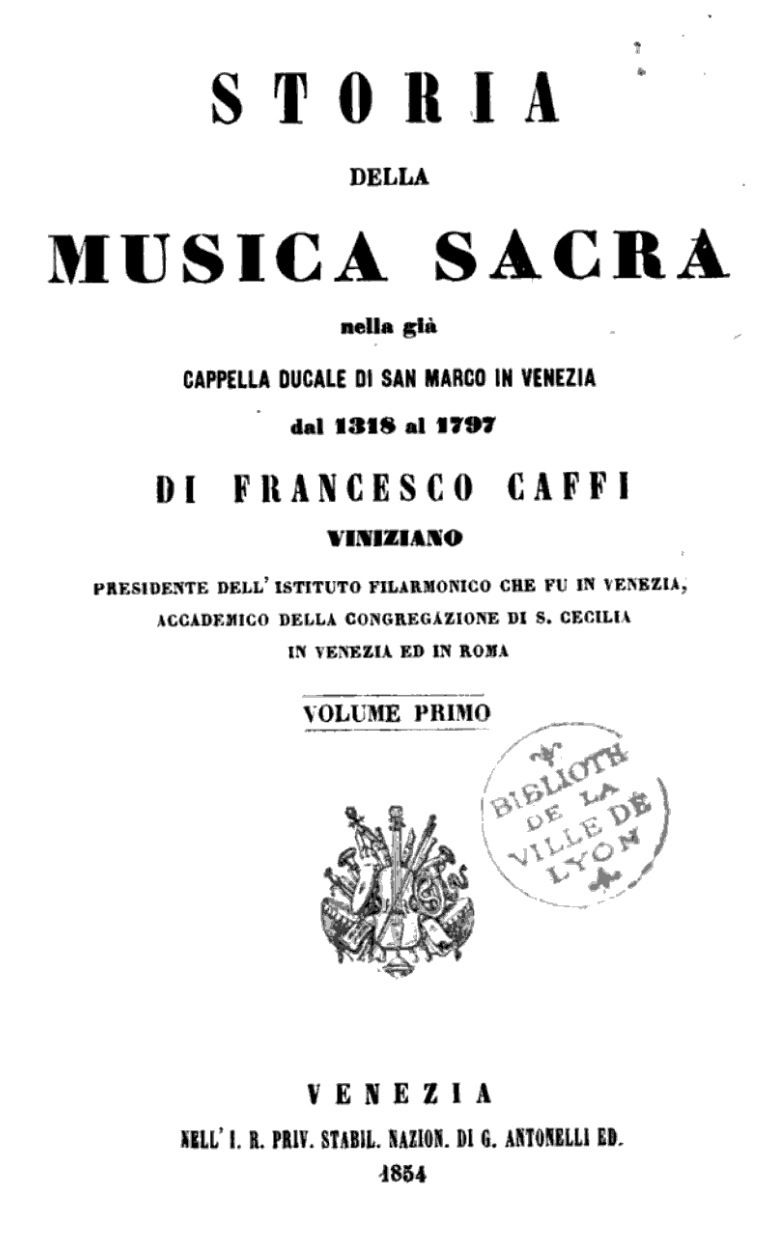
Title page of Storio della musica sacra by Francesco Caffi

Francesco Caffi (14 June 1778 in Venice – 24 January 1874 in Padua) was a councillor and musicologist.

== Life ==
Caffi was born the son of Michele and Bianca Boncio on 14 June 1778. Caffi initially studied law (the profession of his family) privately with don Benedetto de Luca. Afterward, Caffi decided to dedicate himself to music, studying counterpoint under Matteo Rauzzini, Simon Mayr, and Giuseppe Scatena, who was an Augustinian friar and pupil of Antonio Lotti. He studied harpsichord under Francesco Gardi. While still young, he began composing cantatas, melodrammi, and a few instrumental pieces. Though the young Venetian never made it his profession to compose, it allowed him to expand his musicological studies and integrate himself in the music culture of his hometown.

In 1811, Caffi and other music enthusiasts formed the Philharmonic Institute of Venice. The public school of music included concert halls, headquartering in the Saint Rocco and Margherita monastery. The institution closed in 1816 because of economic issues, however. Still, the enterprise proved to be viable.

While a magistrate, Caffi continued to study music history, beginning to draft his Storia generale della musica presso i Veneziani (General History of the Music of the Venetians). The history was initially meant to be divided into five sections. The first three sections would discuss the three musical genres: ecclesiastical, theatrical, and academic. The fourth and fifth sections discussed popular and Venetian music, respectively. His work on the history ceased in 1827, however, when he was transferred to the Milan Court of Appeals. Here, he was able to research and prepare biographies of some musicians from the Venetian school: Andrea Gabrieli, Baldassare Galuppi, Antonio Lotti, Benedetto Marcello, and Gioseffo Zarlino, among others. He first printed these in his Storia della musica sacra (History of Sacred Music).
