= Francesco Vanneschi =

Francesco Vanneschi (floruit 1732 – 1760) was an Italian opera manager, director and librettist; his death date is usually (and erroneously) given as 1759, but he was still alive and working at the King's Theatre in April 1760. He was known as having been active as a librettist in Florence in 1732 when he wrote Enrico (later re-set with music by Galuppi) and in 1741 was appointed as a director and librettist for the King's Theatre in London.

His other opera librettos include: Galuppi's Polidoro and Scipione in Cartagine (both produced at the King's Theatre in 1742), St. Germain's La incosrtanza delusa (produced at the Haymarket Theatre in 1745) and Gluck's La caduta dei giganti. Gluck's opera, a commission by Lord Middlesex, premiered at the King's Theatre in 1746.
