= Panel =

Panel may refer to:

== Arts and media ==
=== Visual arts ===
- Panel painting, in art, a painting on a wood panel (as opposed to canvas, a wall etc)
- Panel (comics), a single image in a comic book, comic strip or cartoon; also, a comic strip containing one such image
- Groupings of rock art, pictographs or petroglyphs

=== Woodworking ===
- Wood panel, frame and panel
- Panelling, wood wall panelling

=== Television ===
- The Panel (Australian TV series), an Australian talk show
- The Panel (Irish TV series), an Irish talk show
- Panel game, a form of game show involving a group of celebrities

== Law ==
- Judicial panel, set of judges who sit to hear a cause of action
- Jury panel, body of people convened to render a judicial verdict
- Panel, or pannel, in Scotland, formal term in solemn proceedings for an accused person; see Indictment

== People ==
- Brice Panel (born 1983), French sprinter
- Caroline Giron-Panel (born 1979), French historian and musicologist

== Science and technology ==
=== Electrical devices ===
- Breaker panel, a flat area containing electrical circuit breakers
- Control panel (engineering), a flat area containing controls and indicators, used to operate machinery
- Flat panel display, in (for example) laptops and mobile devices
- Solar panel, a flat module of photovoltaic solar cells
- Panel switch, a type of electromechanical telephone switching system developed by the Bell System in the 1920s

=== Other physical objects ===
- Several types of planar structural elements
  - Structural insulated panel, a building construction system
- Panelling, a form of wall covering used for decoration and (originally) insulation
- Panel edge staining, build-up on aluminium or stainless steel paneling
- Panels, sections of fabric or other material that make up a parachute canopy

=== Research protocols ===
- Survey panel, a type of non-random sample survey
- Panel study or longitudinal study, a research design involving repeated observations over time
  - Panel data or longitudinal data, measured over time

=== Software ===
- Panel (computer software), a widget or a control element
  - Control panel (software), an interface based by metaphor on a physical control panel
- GNOME Panel, a taskbar implementation for the GNOME desktop environment

=== Other uses in science and technology ===
- Test panel, a predetermined group of medical tests

== Other uses ==
- Panel discussion, a small group of experts speaking in turns before an audience, usually including a question period and usually with the purpose of educating or persuading

== See also ==
- Panel van, or Panel truck, forms of solid van or truck, usually smaller than standard models
