= Caroline Giron-Panel =

French historian and musicologist (born 1979)

Caroline Giron-Panel née Giron (born 30 June 1979 in Angers) is a French historian and musicologist.

== Biography ==
An archivist and palaeographer (class 2004 of the École nationale des chartes), a former member of the École française de Rome (2008–2011), professeure agrégée, Giron-Panel holds a degree in history from the Pierre Mendès-France University of Grenoble and a doctorate in musicology from the Ca' Foscari University of Venice.

Her early work focused on Venice in the modern era, female musical practices, travel stories in Italy and the circulation of cultural models in Europe. She is also interested in gender issues in music (castratos, contraltos, musicians and transgender musicians), the punk scene and comic strips.

In 2006 she obtained the prize of the "Société française d'histoire des hôpitaux", in 2016 the prize of the Levi foundation of the Académie française and the Prix des Muses of the Singer-Polignac Foundation.

She was a scientific advisor by the Venetian Centre for Baroque Music, a member of the Società Italiana delle Storiche and of the Société internationale pour l'étude des femmes de l'Ancien Régime (SIEFAR). Since 2016, she has been vice-president of the "Société française de musicologie".

== Publications ==
- Caroline Giron-Panel; Anne-Madeleine Goulet (2012). La Musique à Rome au XVIIe; études et perspectives de recherche. Rome: École française de Rome. p. 478.
- Caroline Giron-Panel; Sylvie Granger; Raphaëlle Legrand; Bertrand Porot (2015). Musiciennes en duo; mères, compagnes, sœurs ou filles d'artistes. Rennes: Presses universitaires de Rennes. p. 256. ISBN 978-2-7535-3572-5.
- Caroline Giron-Panel (2015). Musique et musiciennes à Venise; histoire sociale des ospedali (PDF). Bibliothèque de l’école française d’Athènes et de Rome (in French). Rome: École française de Rome. pp. 1 082. ISBN 978-2-7283-0993-1. Archived from the original (PDF) on 2017-03-30.
- Caroline Giron-Panel, Catherine Deutsch (dir.), Pratiques musicales féminines: discours, normes, représentations, Lyon, Symétrie, 2016, 214 p. ISBN 978-2-36485-046-0

=== Books ===
- Gérer les vedettes : le cas de l’Académie royale de musique (with S. Serre), in F. Filippi, S. Harvey et S. Marchand, Le sacre de l’acteur, Paris: Armand Colin, 2017, (p. 131-138).
- « Per un approccio interdisciplinare del fatto musicale : prosopografia delle musiciste degli ospedali di Venezia (xvii-xviii sec.) », in S. Chemotti and M. C. La Rocca (dir.), Il genere nella ricerca storica, Padua: Il Poligrafo, 2015, II, (p. 94-104).
- Présences musicales étrangères dans les hôpitaux romains et vénitiens. État d’une recherche en cours, in A. M. Goulet and G. Zur Nieden (dir.), Europäische Musiker in Venedig, Rom und Neapel (1650–1750) / Les Musiciens d’Europe à Venise, Rome et Naples (1650–1750) / Musicisti europei a Venezia, Roma e Napoli (1650–1750) / European musicians in Venice, Rome and Naples (1650–1750), Cassel : Bärenreiter, 2015 ("Analecta musicologica, 52"), (p. 442-464).
- Caroline Giron-Panel; Veerle Fraeters; Imke de Gier; et al. (2014). "Piae virgines choristae: female musicians for the Greater Glory of God and the Venice Republic". Mulieres religiosae: Shaping Female Spiritual Authority. Turnhout: Brépols. pp. 180–188..
- Music in the "Ospedali", in Art and Music in Venice. From the Renaissance to the Baroque, exhibition catalogue, Montreal: Museum of Fine Arts, 2013, (p. 73-80).
- « La musique dans les ospedali », in Splendore a Venezia. Art et musique de la Renaissance au Baroque dans la Sérénissime, exhibition catalogue, Montreal: Musée des Beaux-Arts, 2013, (p. 73-80).
- « Gli ospedali : luoghi e reti di socialità femminile », in A. Bellavitis, N. M. Filippini and T. Plebani (dir.), Spazi, poteri, diritti delle donne a Venezia in età moderna, Vérone : Quiedit, 2012, (p. 291-309).
- Entre art et technique : l’apprentissage de la musique en famille et en dehors des familles à Venise (XVI^{e}-XVIII^{e} siècles), in A. Bellavitis and I. Chabot (dir.), La justice des familles. Autour de la transmission des biens, des savoirs et des pouvoirs (Europe, Nouveau Monde, XII^{e}-XIX^{e} siècles), Rome: École française de Rome, 2011, (p. 315-332).
- Spectacle du pouvoir et pouvoir du spectacle, ou comment la République de Venise sut éblouir les princes d’Europe, in M. B. Dufourcet, C. Mazouer et A. Surgers (dir.), Spectacles et pouvoirs dans l’Europe de l’Ancien régime (XVI^{e}-XVIII^{e} siècles), Tübingen : Gunter Narr, 2011, (p. 167-182).
- Les circulations musicales, Les voyages de Mozart and Les voyages musicaux de Charles Burney, in coll., Les Circulations internationales en Europe, 1680-1780 (textbook), Paris, Atlande, coll. "Clefs concours", 2011
- "La musica ha la sua propria sede in questa città": histoire urbaine et espaces musicaux à Venise, 1600-1797, in L. Gauthier and M. Traversier (dir.), Mélodies urbaines : la musique dans les villes d’Europe (XVI^{e}-XIX^{e} siècles), Paris : Presses Universitaires Paris Sorbonne, 2008, (p. 67-80).
- "Orfane filarmoniche : l'éducation des orphelines à la musique dans la Venise du XVII^{e} siècle", in A. Defrance, D. Lopez and F. J. Ruggiu (dir.), Regards sur l’enfance au XVII^{e} siècle, Tübingen : Gunter Narr, 2007, (p. 134-146).

=== Articles ===
- Enfants prodiges, génies en devenir : former les enfants à la musique dans les ospedali de Venise (xvii^{e}-xviii^{e} siècles), in Mélanges de l’école française de Rome – Italie, Méditerranée, n° 123–2, 2011, (p. 347-357).
- "On peut arriver en Italie, en passant par la Bohême". Les voyages italiens de C.W. Gluck », dans Sylvie Le Moël et Laurine Quetin (dir.), Les Lumières et la culture musicale européenne : C. W. Gluck, revue Musicorum, n° 9, 2011, (p. 7-20).
- Des orphelines consacrées à la musique : essai de définition et étude de l’environnement social et familial des “filles du chœur” des ospedali vénitiens, in Mélanges de l’école française de Rome – Italie, Méditerranée, n° 120–1, 2008, (p. 189-210).
- Entre église et théâtre: la fugue de deux musiciennes vénitiennes en 1783, in Clio. Femmes, genre, histoire, n° 25, 2007, (p. 99-119).
- Une collection perdue : les instruments de l’ospedale des Mendicanti, à Venise, in Musique-Images-Instruments, n° 8, 2006, (p. 28-47).
- Hôpital, thérapeutique et musique à Venise après le concile de Trente: l’ospedale di San Lazzaro e dei Mendicanti, in Livraisons d'Histoire de l'Architecture, n° 7, 2004, (p. 39-50).
