= Baldassare Galuppi =

Italian composer (1706–1785)

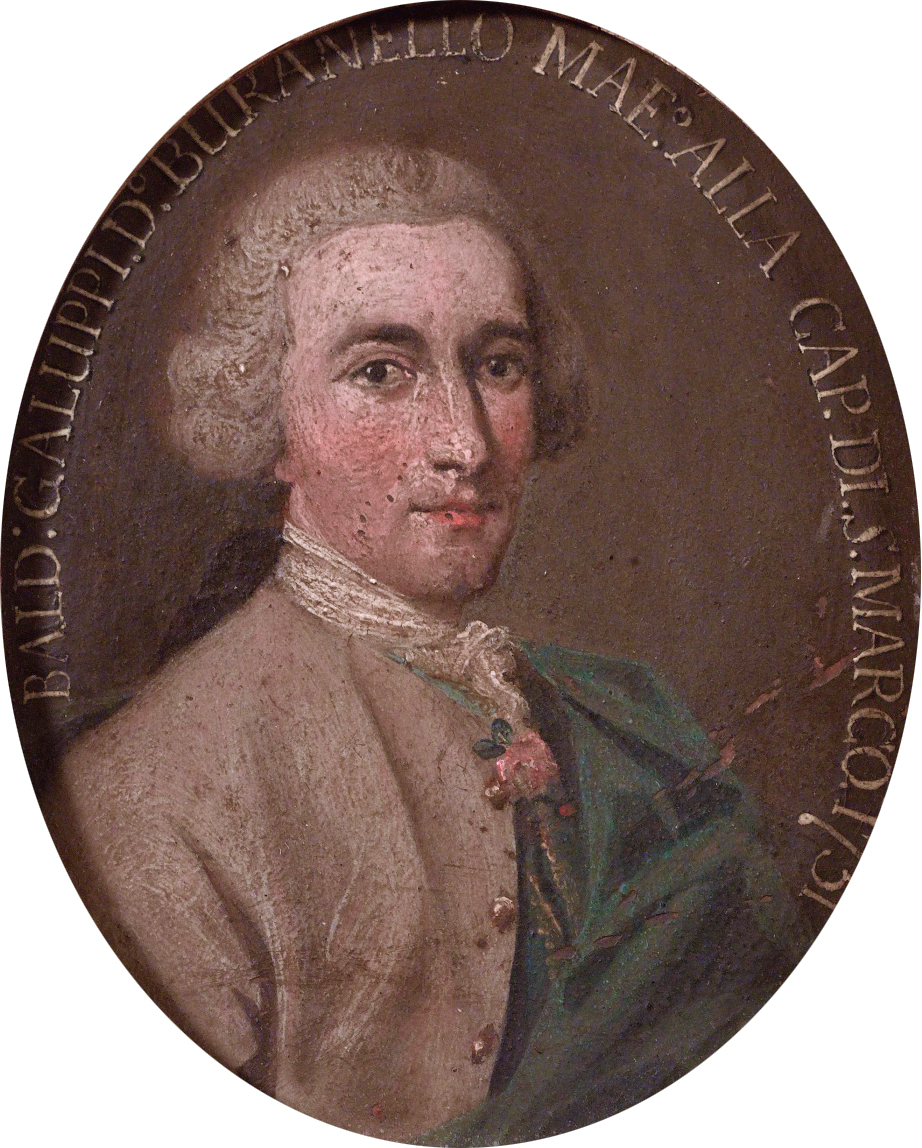
- Galuppi by a Venetian artist, bearing date 1751
- Born: 18 October 1706; Burano
- Died: 3 January 1785 (aged 78); Venice
- Occupations: Composer; Music director
- Organizations: St Mark's Basilica
- Works: List of operas

Baldassare Galuppi (18 October 1706 – 3 January 1785) was a Venetian composer, born on the island of Burano in the Venetian Republic. He belonged to a generation of composers, including Johann Adolph Hasse, Giovanni Battista Sammartini, and C. P. E. Bach, whose works are emblematic of the prevailing galant music that developed in Europe throughout the 18th century. He achieved international success, spending periods of his career in Vienna, London and Saint Petersburg, but his main base remained Venice, where he held a succession of leading appointments.

In his early career, Galuppi made a modest success in opera seria, but from the 1740s, together with the playwright and librettist Carlo Goldoni, he became famous throughout Europe for his comic operas in the new dramma giocoso style. To the succeeding generation of composers, he was known as "the father of comic opera". Some of his mature opere serie, for which his librettists included the poet and dramatist Metastasio, were also widely popular.

Throughout his career, Galuppi held official positions with charitable and religious institutions in Venice, the most prestigious of which was maestro di cappella at the Doge's chapel, St Mark's Basilica. In these various capacities, he composed a large amount of sacred music. He was also highly regarded as a virtuoso performer on and composer for keyboard instruments.

In the latter half of the 18th century, Galuppi's music was largely forgotten outside of Italy, and Napoleon's invasion of Venice in 1797 resulted in Galuppi's manuscripts being scattered around Western Europe, and in many cases, destroyed or lost. Galuppi's name persists in the English poet Robert Browning's 1855 poem "A Toccata of Galuppi's", but this has not helped maintain the composer's work in the general repertoire. Some of Galuppi's works were occasionally performed in the 200 years after his death, but it was not until the last years of the 20th century that his compositions were extensively revived in live performance and on recordings.

== Biography ==
=== Early years ===
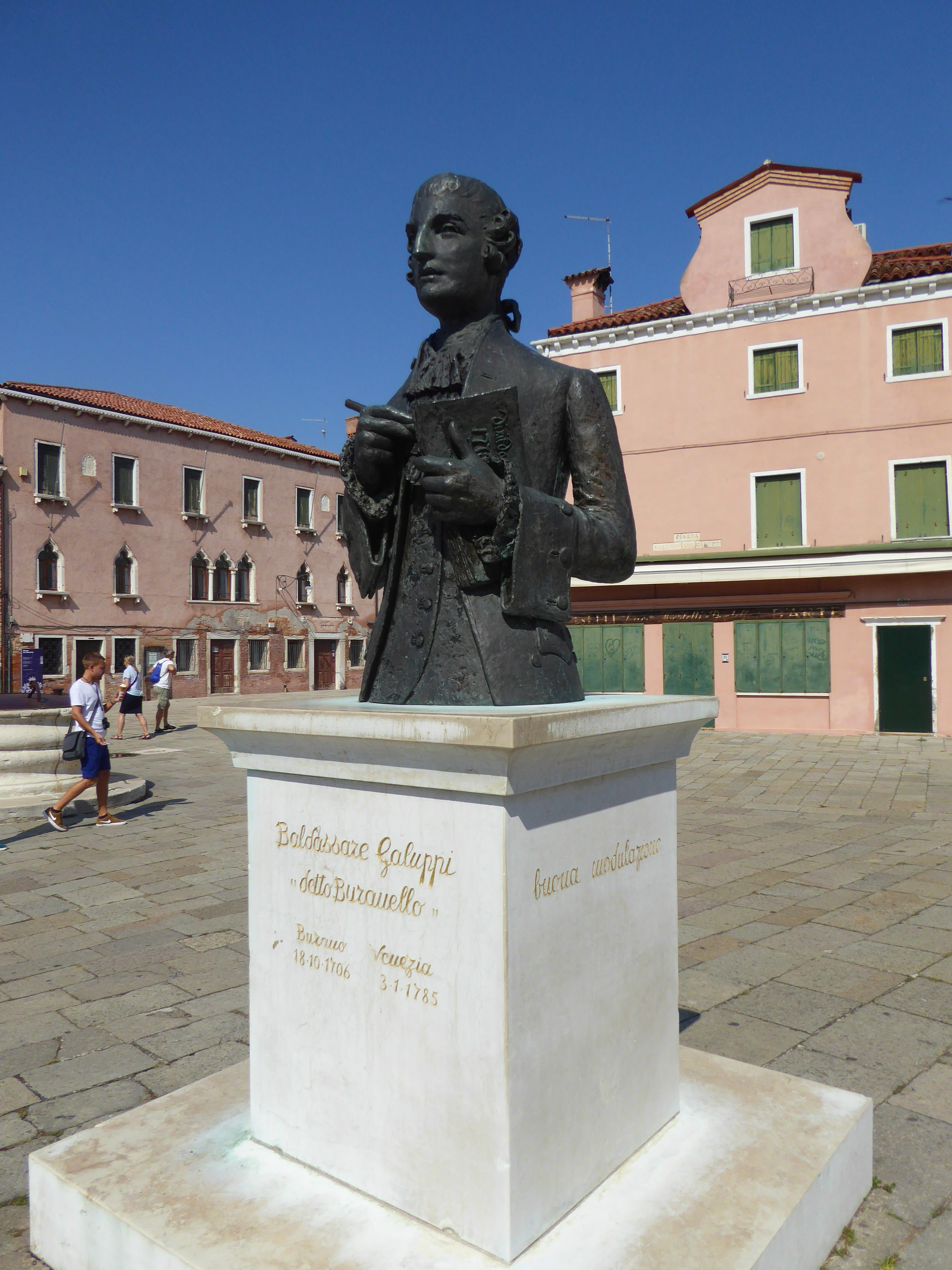
Statue of Galuppi in the main square of Burano, the Piazza Galuppi

Galuppi was born on the island of Burano in the Venetian Lagoon, and from as early as age 22 was known as "Il Buranello", a nickname which even appears in the signature on his music manuscripts, "Baldassare Galuppi, called 'Buranello'." His father was a barber, who also played the violin in theatre orchestras, and is believed to have been his son's first music teacher. Although there is no documentation, oral tradition as related to Francesco Caffi in the nineteenth century says that the young Galuppi was trained in composition and harpsichord by Antonio Lotti, the chief organist at St Mark's Basilica. At the age of 15, Galuppi composed his first opera, Gli amici rivali, which, according to Caffi, was performed unsuccessfully at Chioggia and equally unsuccessfully in Vicenza under the title La fede nell'incostanza.

From 1726 to 1728, Galuppi was harpsichordist at the Teatro della Pergola in Florence. On his return to Venice in 1728, he produced a second opera, Gl'odi delusi dal sangue, written in collaboration with another Lotti pupil, Giovanni Battista Pescetti; it was well received when it was presented at the Teatro San Angelo. The collaborators followed it with an opera seria, Dorinda, the next year. This, too, was modestly successful, and Galuppi began to receive commissions for operas and oratorios.

In 1740, Galuppi was appointed "maestro di coro" at the Ospedale dei Mendicanti in Venice, where his duties ranged from teaching and conducting to composing liturgical music and oratorios. In his first year of service at the Mendicanti, he composed 31 works: 16 motets, 13 settings of the Salve Regina, and two psalm settings. Although he became internationally known as an operatic composer, he maintained a steady output of sacred music throughout his career.

=== London and return to Venice ===
In 1741, Galuppi was invited to work in London. He petitioned the Mendicanti authorities for leave of absence, to which they agreed.

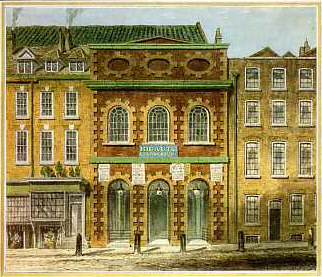
The King's Theatre, Haymarket, London

He was in England for 18 months, supervising productions for the Italian opera company at the King's Theatre. Of the 11 operas under his direction, at least three are known to have been his own compositions, Penelope, Scipione in Cartagine and Sirbace; a fourth was presented shortly after he left London to return to Venice. Rival composer Handel attended one of these productions. Galuppi also attracted attention as a keyboard virtuoso and composer. His contemporary, the English musicologist Charles Burney, wrote that "Galuppi had had more influence on English music than any other Italian composer". However, in Burney's view Galuppi's skills were still immature during his spell in London. Burney wrote, "He now copied the hasty, light and flimsy style which reigned in Italy at this time, and which Handel's solidity and science had taught the English to despise."

On his return to Venice in May 1743, Galuppi returned to his employment with the Mendicanti, and to composing for the opera houses. The operatic fashion in Venice was on the point of changing from opera seria to a new style of comic opera, dramma giocoso. Full-length comic operas from Naples and Rome were becoming fashionable; Galuppi adapted three of them for Venetian audiences in 1744, and the following year composed one of his own, La forza d'amore, which was only a mild success. He continued to compose serious operas, sometimes in partnership with the librettist Metastasio. (Note: Metastasio and Galuppi collaborated on Issipile (1737), Alessandro nell' Indie (1738), Adriano in Siria (1740), Didone abbandonata (1741), Antigono (1746), L'Olimpiade (1747), Demetrio (1748), Artaserse (1749), Semiramide riconosciuta (1749), Demofoonte (1749), L'eroe cinese (1753), Siroe (1754), Ezio (1757), Ipermestra (1758), Il re pastore (1758), La clemenza di Tito (1760) and Viriate (1762).) The latter believed firmly that the music was there to serve the text rather than vice versa. He grumbled about Galuppi in 1749, "He is, I presume, an excellent composer for violins, for cellos and for voices, but he is an exceedingly bad one for poets. When he writes he thinks as much about the words as you do about being elected Pope ... As far as the public is concerned, he is appreciated by those who judge with their ears but not their souls." Nevertheless, their joint work prospered, and was staged in other countries. In Vienna, their Demetrio and Artaserse were great successes, the former breaking all local box-office records.

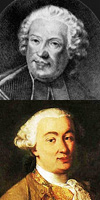
Galuppi's best-known librettists, Metastasio, top, and Carlo Goldoni

In May 1748, Galuppi was appointed vice-maestro of the Doge's chapel, St Mark's. In time this would lead to a large body of religious compositions, but for the present Galuppi was chiefly engaged in operatic work. It is not clear to Denis Arnold why he accepted the post at St Mark's. The musicologist writes, "He was already a very successful opera composer and with his duties at the Mendicanti he must have had enough to do. The salary at St Mark's was only 120 ducats. ... At this time, it was not a very distinguished cappella. The choir probably numbered about 30; but since their posts continued up to death, a fair proportion of the singers were old." However, Daniel Heartz points out that Galuppi's salary eventually increased to 400 ducats per annum, and then to 600 ducats. In addition to the prestige of the position, Galuppi was given a house near the basilica in which he and his family lived rent-free, and as he had very few firm obligations as vice-maestro, the position left him with the flexibility to compose for other venues, including opera houses in Venice, Vienna, London, and Berlin. By the time of his death, Galuppi and Gluck were two of the highest paid composers of the 18th century. (See Heartz, 2003)

Galuppi was fortunate that when he turned once more to comic opera in 1749 he collaborated with Carlo Goldoni. Although an established and eminent playwright by the time he worked with Galuppi, Goldoni was happy for his libretti to be subservient to the music. He was as warm in his regard for Galuppi as Metastasio was cold. Their first collaboration was Arcadia in Brenta followed by four more joint works within a year. They were enormously popular at home and abroad, and to meet the demand for new drammi giocosi and opere serie Galuppi had to resign his post at the Mendicanti in 1751. (Note: Arnold (1985, p. 45) says that Galuppi "left the Mendicanti under something of a cloud", but does not say what the cloud was.) By the middle of the 1750s he was, in the words of musicologist Dale Monson, "the most popular opera composer anywhere".

For the next ten years, Galuppi remained in Venice, with occasional sorties elsewhere for commissions and premieres, producing a series of secular and religious works. His operas, serious or comic, were in demand across Europe. Of the British premiere of Il filosofo di campagna in 1761 Burney wrote, "This burletta surpassed in musical merit all the comic operas that were performed in England, till the Buona Figliuola." (Note: La buona figliuola (1760) was a work by Goldoni and Piccinni.)

In April 1762, Galuppi was appointed to the leading musical post in Venice, maestro di capella of St Mark's, and in July of the same year, he was also appointed maestro di coro (choir master) at the Ospedale degli Incurabili. At St Mark's, he set about reforming the choir. He persuaded the Basilica authorities, the Procurators, to be more flexible in payments to singers, allowing him to attract performers with first-rate voices such as Gaetano Guadagni and Gasparo Pacchiarotti.

=== Saint Petersburg ===
Catherine the Great

Early in 1764, Catherine the Great of Russia made it known through diplomatic channels that she wished Galuppi to come to Saint Petersburg as her court composer and conductor. There were prolonged negotiations between Russia and the Venetian authorities before the Senate of Venice agreed to release Galuppi for a three-year engagement at the Russian court. The contract required him to "compose and produce operas, ballets and cantatas for ceremonial banquets", at a salary of 4,000 rubles and the provision of accommodation and a carriage. Galuppi was reluctant, but Venetian officials assured him that his post and salary as maestro di cappella at St. Mark's were secure until 1768 as long as he supplied a Gloria and a Credo for the Basilica's Christmas mass each year.

In June 1764, the senate granted Galuppi formal leave to go. He resigned his post at the Incurabili, made provision for his wife and daughters (who were to remain in Venice, while his son travelled with him), and set off for Russia. He made detours on his journey, visiting C.P.E. Bach in Berlin and encountering Giacomo Casanova by chance outside of Riga, before arriving in Saint Petersburg on 22 September 1765.

For the empress's court, Galuppi composed new works, both operatic and liturgical, and revived and revised many others. He wrote one opera there, Ifigenia in Tauride (1768), and two cantatas, La virtù liberata (1765) and La pace tra la virtù e la bellezza (1766), the latter to words by Metastasio. In addition to the work for which he had been contracted, Galuppi gave weekly recitals at the harpsichord, and sometimes conducted orchestral concerts. To improve standards he was a hard taskmaster to the court orchestra, but was from the outset enormously impressed by the court choir. He is reported to have exclaimed, "I'd never heard such a magnificent choir in Italy". Galuppi took pride in his prestigious appointments; the title page of his 1766 Christmas mass for St Mark's describes him as: "First Master and Director of all the Music for Her Imperial Majesty the Empress of all the Russias, etc. etc. and First Master of the Ducal Chapel of St. Mark's in Venice." In 1768, as had been agreed, he returned to Venice, detouring again on his journey, this time to visit Johann Adolph Hasse in Vienna.

=== Later years ===
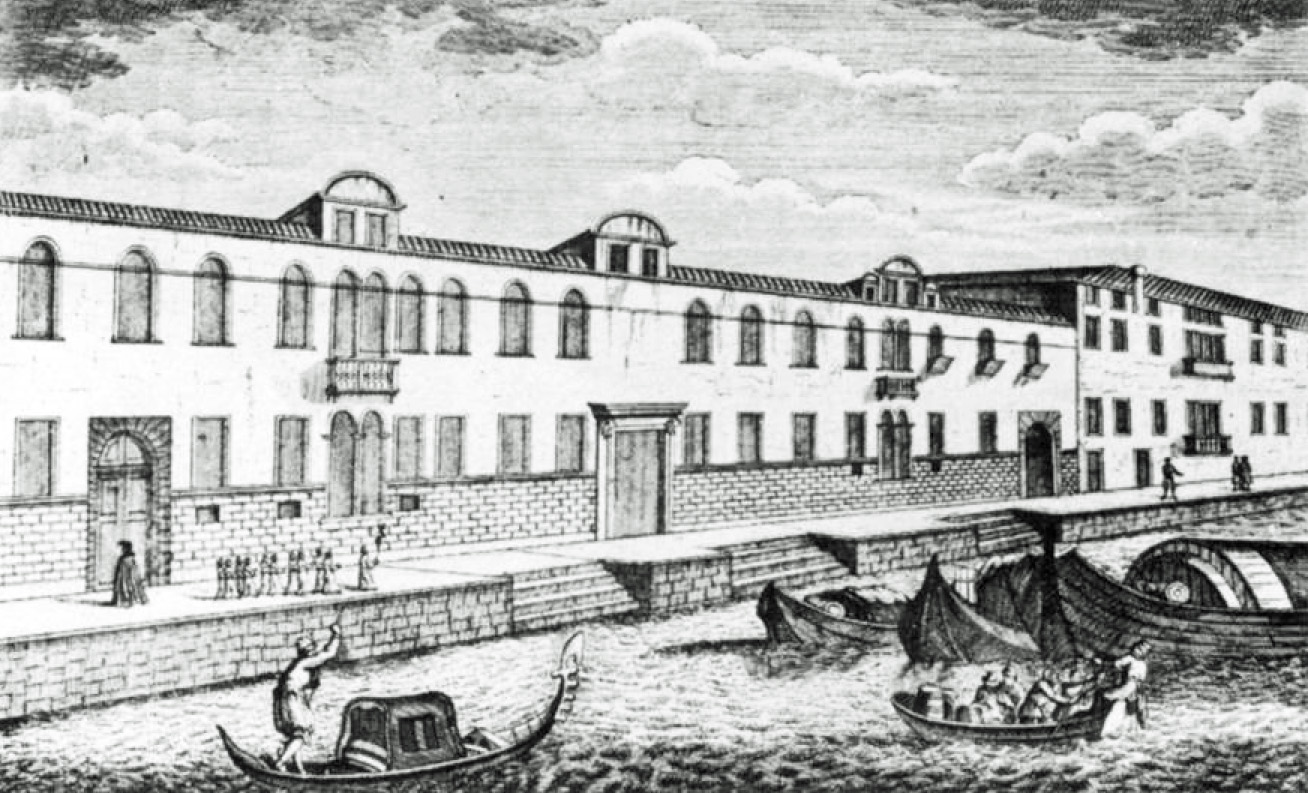
Ospedale degli Incurabili, Venice, where Galuppi was in charge of music 1762–1765 and 1768–1776

On his return to Venice, Galuppi resumed his duties at St Mark's and successfully applied for reappointment at the Incurabili, holding the post until 1776, when financial constraints obliged all the ospedali to cut back their musical activities. In his later years, he wrote more sacred than secular music. His output continued to be considerable in both quantity and quality. Burney, who visited him in Venice, wrote in 1771:

It seems as if the genius of Signor Galuppi, like that of Titian, became more animated by age. He cannot now be less than seventy years old, and yet it is generally allowed here that his last operas and his last compositions for the church abound with more spirit, taste, and fancy, than those of any other period of his life.

Galuppi told Burney his definition of good music: vaghezza, chiarezza, e buona modulazione (beauty, clearness, and good modulation)". Burney commented on Galuppi's prodigious workload that in addition to his duties at St Mark's and the Incurabili, "he has a hundred sequins a year as domestic organist to the family of Gritti, and is organist of another church, of which I have forgotten the name".

The last opera by Galuppi was La serva per amore, premiered in October 1773. In May 1782, he conducted concerts to mark a papal visit to Venice by Pope Pius VI. Thereafter, he continued to compose, despite declining health. His last known completed work is the 1784 Christmas mass for St Mark's.

After a two-month illness, Galuppi died on 3 January 1785. He was buried in the church of San Vitale, and, much mourned, was commemorated by a requiem mass "solemnized in the church of Santo Stefano, paid for by professional musicians, at which the actors of the Teatro S Benedetto sang".

== Music ==
=== Operas ===
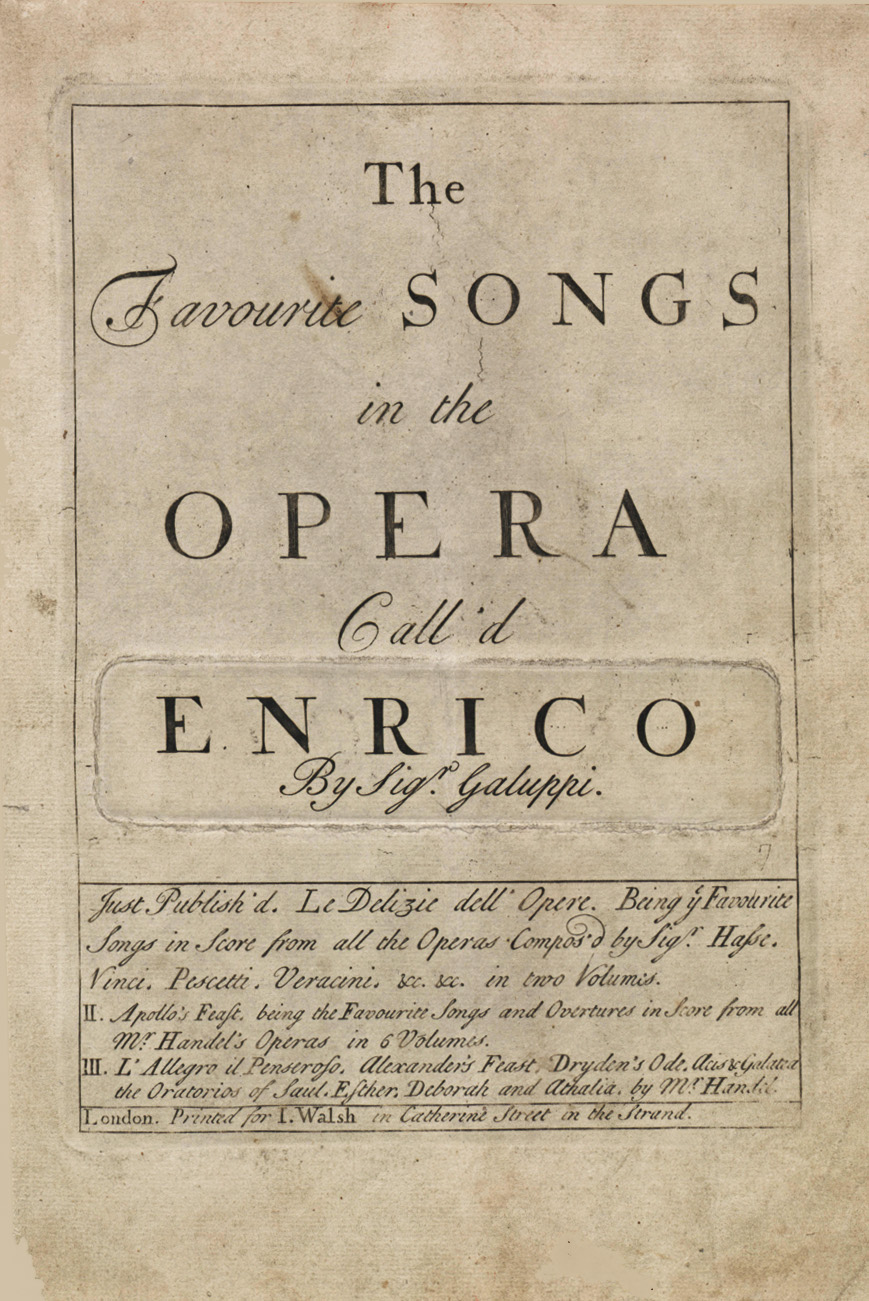
Arias from Galuppi's 1743 opera, Enrico, to a libretto by Francesco Vanneschi

According to The Musical Times Galuppi, with 109 operas, was the sixth most prolific opera composer. His output was exceeded by his contemporaries Draghi, Piccinni, Paisiello, Guglielmi, and the most prolific of all, with 166 operas, Wenzel Müller; the only composer of later generations who approached his output was Offenbach 100 years later. Like most of his contemporaries, Galuppi did not hesitate to re-use his own music, sometimes simply transplanting it and at other times reworking it substantially. (Note: Metastasio's claim that Galuppi borrowed from other composers has never been substantiated, and both Burney and Vogler went to great lengths to refute that assertion. However, both Vivaldi and Handel borrowed music from Galuppi's works, as both Michael Talbot and Thomas Goleeke have discovered.)

He was called "the father of comic opera" by musicians of the generation that followed him. The 21st-century editor and musicologist Francesco Luisi writes that although this description is not strictly accurate, the Galuppi–Goldoni operas were "a genuinely new beginning for musical theatre". In Luisi's view these works fundamentally changed the nature of opera by making the music part of the drama and not merely a decoration. Galuppi's contemporary Esteban de Arteaga wrote approvingly that the composer was able to "illumine the personalities of the characters and the situations in which they find themselves by selecting the most appropriate type of voice and style of singing".

As well as his general contribution to the essentials of comic opera, establishing the music as at least as important as the words, Galuppi's (and Goldoni's) more specific legacy to comic opera was the large-scale buffo finale to end the acts. Hitherto acts had ended in short choruses or ensembles, but the elaborate and substantial finales introduced by Galuppi and his librettist set the pattern for Haydn and Mozart. (Note: In 1768, Haydn wrote his first full-length comic opera, Lo speziale and Mozart composed La finta semplice, both to libretti by Goldoni.)

Galuppi's music for his comic operas is described by Luisi as "largely syllabic … designed to enhance the intelligibility of the text … without impairing the fluidity of the melodic lines." In his opere serie he observed the convention of the da capo aria, but used it sparingly in his comic works. In performances of his serious operas, leading soloists would as a matter of course interpolate arias written by other composers: the "opus integer" – a complete work not to be tampered with – was not the rule in 18th-century opera seria.

=== Sacred music ===
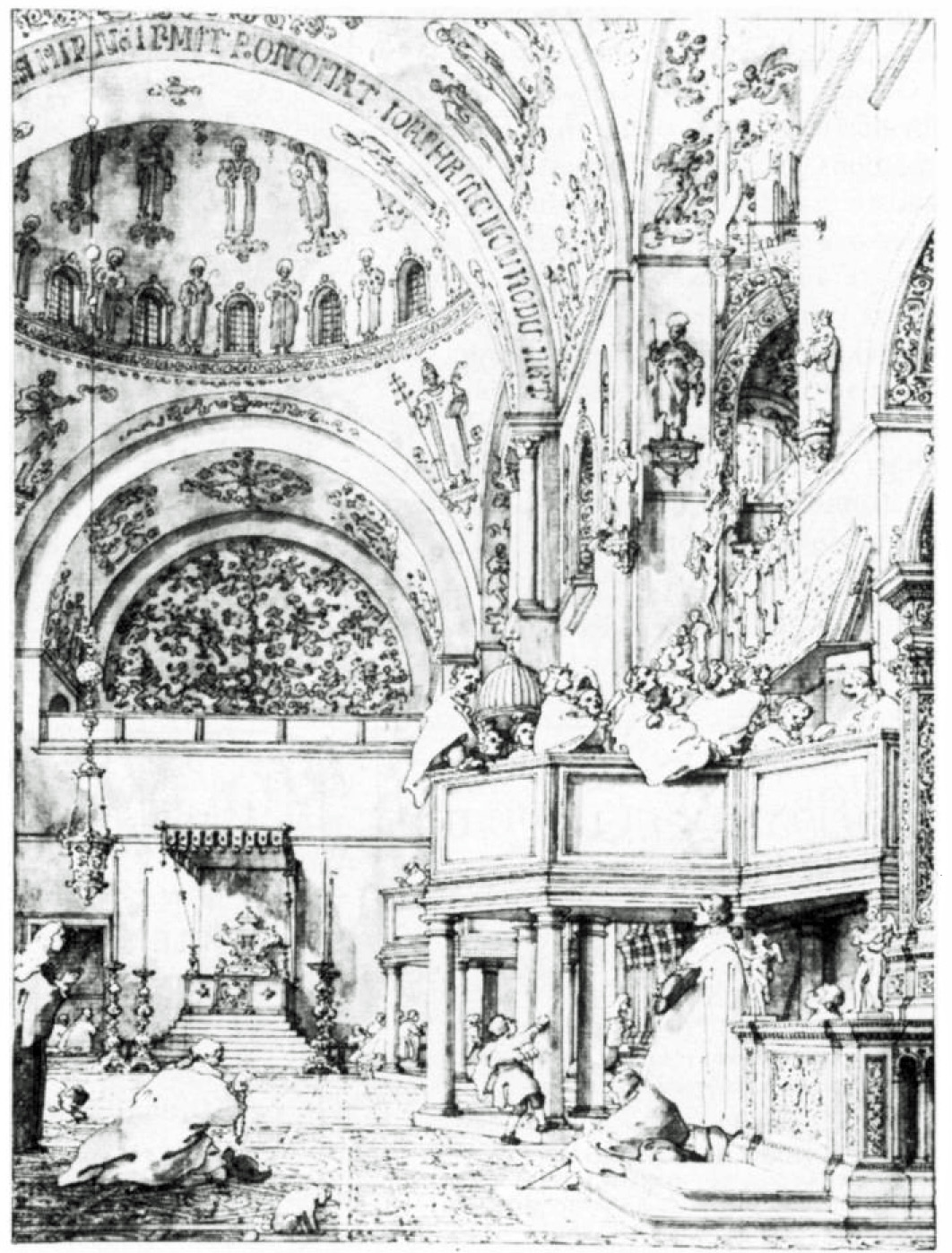
Musicians' gallery in St Mark's, by Canaletto

Among the corpus of Galuppi's authenticated sacred works are at least 284 works: 52 masses and movements pertaining to the mass, 73 settings of psalms and music for the offices, 8 motets, and 26 uncategorized works, including hymns, versetti, a setting of St. John's Passion for women's voices, and a Baccanale for the church of San Rocco. The largest repository of manuscripts outside of Italy is the Sächsische Landesbibliothek – Staats- und Universitätsbibliothek in Dresden, but manuscripts are also found in collections in Munich, Paris, Prague, Vienna, and New York, among others. In recent years Ines Burde, Franco Passadore, and Franco Rossi have all made progress toward a comprehensive catalogue of Galuppi's sacred music, but a complete inventory is still out of reach due to the large number of lost or missing manuscripts, spurious attributions, and forgeries.

In his religious works, Galuppi mixed modern and antique styles. It was then the custom to incorporate into new church music the stile antico with smooth vocal lines in the tradition of Palestrina and a good deal of counterpoint. However, Galuppi applied the stile antico sparingly, and when he felt constrained to write contrapuntal music for the choir he would balance it with a bright modern style for the orchestral accompaniment. His masses and psalm settings for St Mark's exploit all the resources available to a modern composer in the mid-18th century, with choir supported by an orchestra of strings and some or all of flutes, oboes, bassoons, horns, trumpets, and organ. In his tutti choral writing, Galuppi generally leaned toward syllabic settings, reserving the technically demanding melismatic passages for soloists.

Monson notes that the church music composed by Galuppi in Saint Petersburg had a lasting influence on Russian church music: "His 15 a cappella works on Russian texts for the Orthodox liturgy proved to be a watershed. Their Italian, light contrapuntal style joined with native melodic idioms was continued by Traetta and Sarti and maintained by, among others, D.S. Bortnyans'ky, his pupil." Marina Ritzarev comments that the Italian Vincenzo Manfredini was Galuppi's predecessor as Russian court composer, and may have paved the way for his successor's innovations.

Several works long attributed to Galuppi by publishers were shown to be the work of Vivaldi. In 2003, a Nisi Dominus previously thought to be by Galuppi was reattributed to Vivaldi. The music of the latter, a generation earlier than Galuppi, had gone out of fashion after his death, and unscrupulous copyists and editors found that Galuppi's name on the title page increased a work's appeal. Three other works in the Saxon State Collection have also been reattributed from Galuppi to Vivaldi: a Beatus Vir, a Dixit Dominus and a Laetatus sum.

=== Instrumental works ===
Galuppi was much admired for his keyboard music. Few of his sonatas were published in his lifetime, but many survive in manuscript. Some of them follow the Scarlatti single-movement model; others are in the three-movement form later adopted by Haydn, Mozart, Beethoven and others.

Galuppi's skill as keyboard player is well documented. Hillers Wöchentliche Nachrichten in 1772 made this mention of Galuppi's reputation in Saint Petersburg: "Chamber concerts were held every Wednesday in the antechamber of the imperial apartments, in order to enjoy the special style and fiery accuracy of the clavier playing of this great artist; thus did the virtuoso earn the overall approval of the court." It is no surprise that a number of Galuppi's keyboard works should make it into print during his lifetime, including two sets of six sonatas, published in London as opus 1 (1756) and opus 2 (1759) respectively. Felix Raabe mentions the round number of 125 "sonatas, toccatas, divertimenti and etudes" for keyboard, based on Fausto Torrefranca's 1909 thematic catalogue of Galuppi's cembalo works. However, given some of the outrageous assertions on this topic that Torrefranca makes elsewhere (such as that the classical sonata form was created by Italian keyboard composers) the accuracy of this figure must be accepted only cautiously.

Galuppi's seven experimental Concerti a quattro are particularly innovative chamber music pieces that foreshadow the development of the classical string quartet. Each of the concerti is a three-movement work for two violins, viola and cello that integrates the counterpoint of the sonata da chiesa with daring chromatic twists and harmonic detours that become more pronounced as the set progresses quartet by quartet. Innovations such as the chromatically raised 5th that Burney singled out in Galuppi's arias of the 1740s appear, and many harmonic features of the late-classical period are foreshadowed, such as the final deceptive cadence in which an augmented sixth chord is substituted before the ultimate resolution.

Among other instrumental compositions by Galuppi, Grove's Dictionary lists sinfonias, overtures, trios and string quartets, and concerti for solo instruments and strings.

== Legacy ==
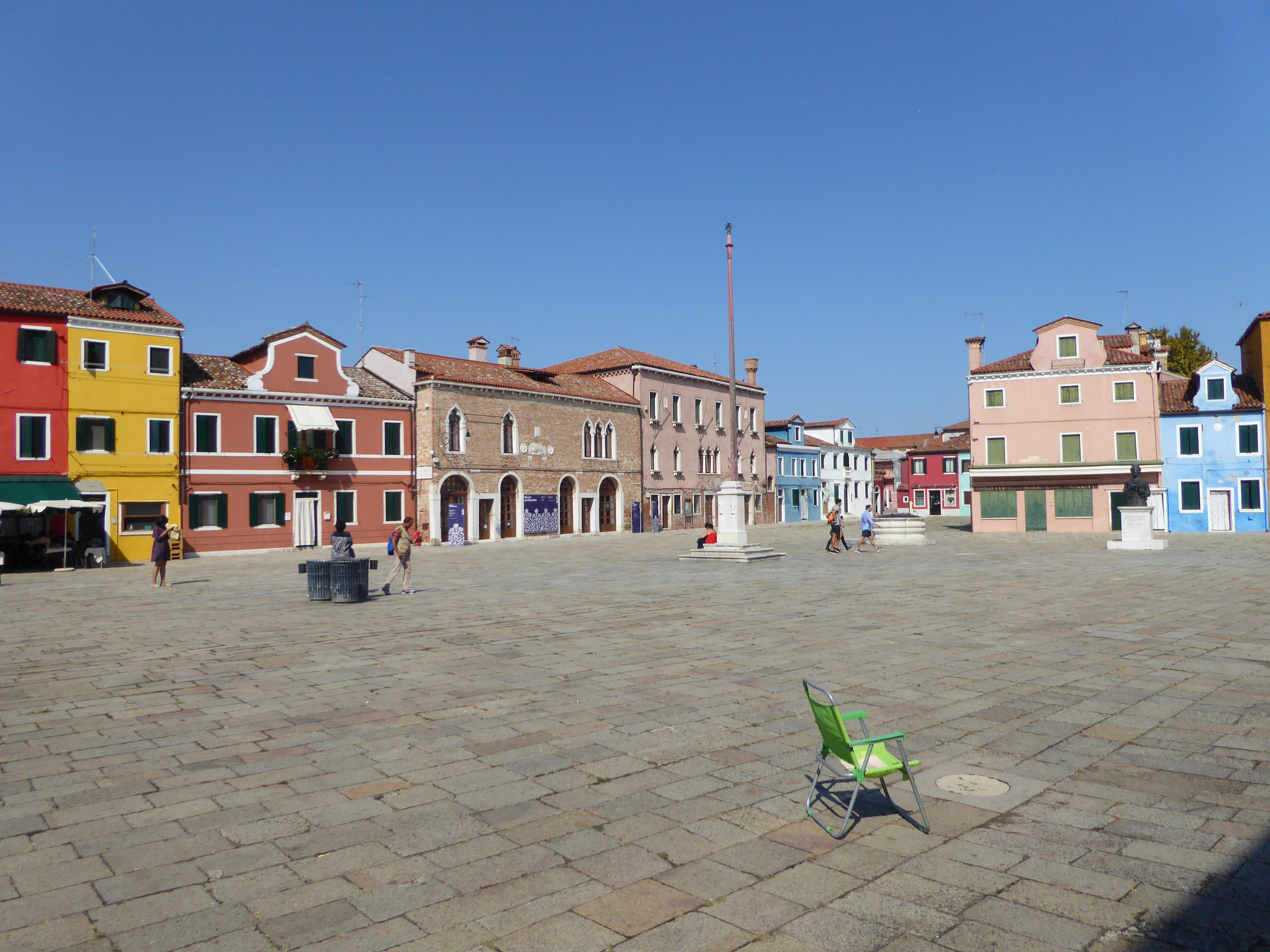
Burano's Piazza Galuppi is named for the composer

Robert Browning's poem A Toccata of Galuppi's refers to Galuppi and his work. It is not known whether Browning was thinking of any one piece by Galuppi; in Galuppi's time, the terms "toccata" and "sonata" were less clearly differentiated than they later became, and were used interchangeably. A number of pieces have been suggested as Browning's inspiration, but as Charles van den Borren wrote in The Musical Times, "every poet has the right to evade the prosaic minutiae of fact", and it is impossible to state with confidence that one Galuppi piece has more claim than another to be the inspiration for the poem. The poem inspired a 1989 setting, in modern idiom but with musical quotations from Galuppi's works, by the composer Dominick Argento.

Browning's poem was followed by a few revivals of Galuppi works, and the composer's music was played at memorials for the poet, both in church and in the concert hall. But performances of Galuppi's music remained sporadic. La diavolessa was revived for the first time at the Venice Music Festival in 1952; Il filosofo di campagna was revived in 1959, starring Ilva Ligabue and Renato Capecchi, and was staged at the Buxton Festival in 1985.

=== Recordings ===
From the late 20th century onwards, an increasing number of Galuppi's works have been committed to disc. Among the opera recordings on CD or DVD are Il caffè di campagna (2011), La clemenza di Tito (2010), La diavolessa (2004), Didone abbandonata (2007), Il filosofo di campagna (1959 and 2001), Gustavo primo re di Svezia (2005), Il mondo alla roversa (2007), and L'Olimpiade (2009). Three series of recordings of the keyboard sonatas have been launched, by Peter Seivewright on the Divine Art label, Matteo Napoli on Naxos. and Marcella Crudeli on Radio Vatican Studios own label. In addition, Brilliant Classics released, in 2016, a two-CD set of keyboard sonatas performed on the organ by Luca Scandali. Choral works put on CD include the 1766 Messa per San Marco (2007), a cantata, L'oracolo del Vaticano, to words by Goldoni (2004), and motets (2001).
