= Teatro San Samuele =

Coordinates: 45.4329°N 12.3289°E

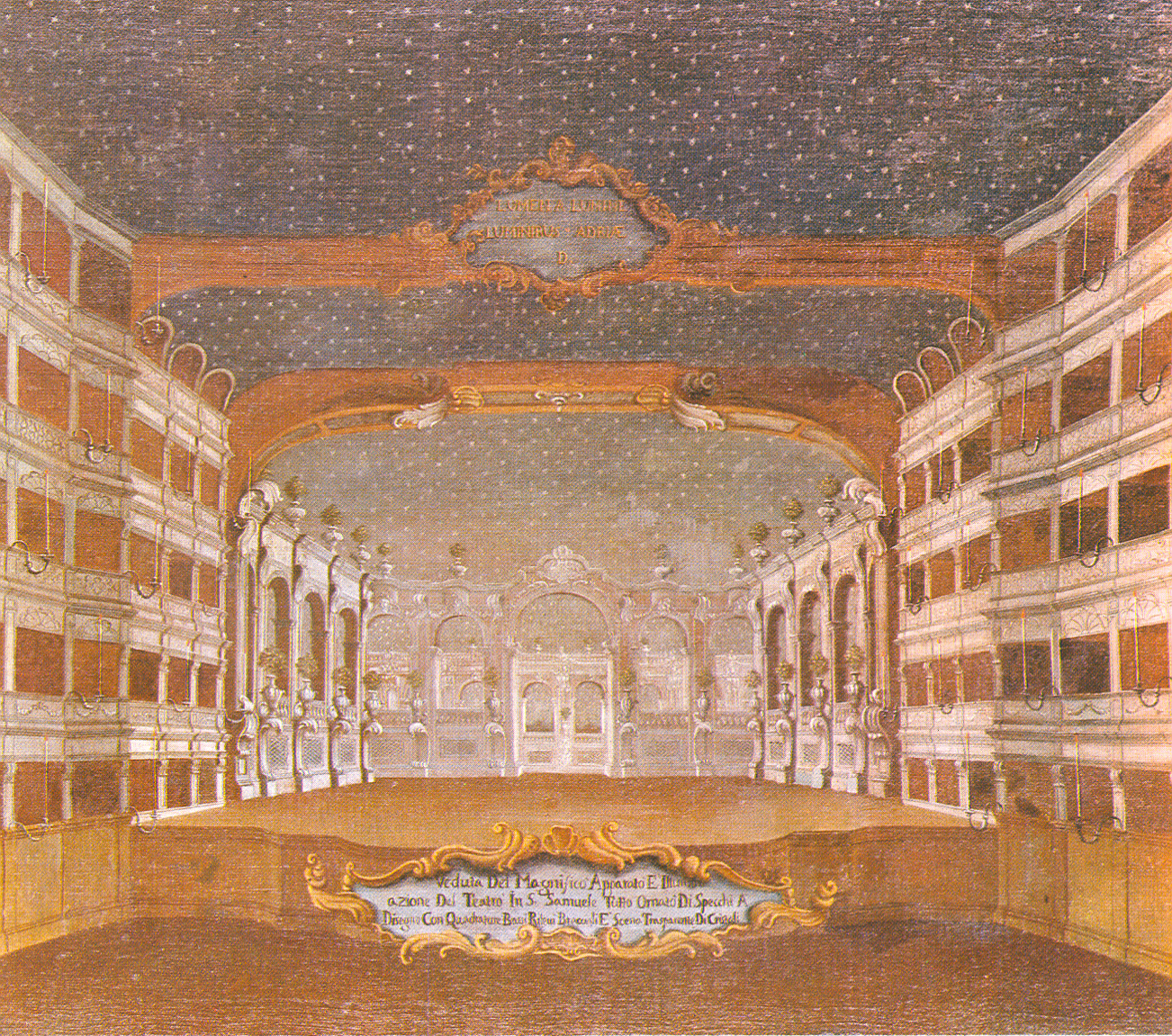
Painting of the Teatro San Samuele by Gabriele Bella (1730–1799)

Teatro San Samuele was an opera house and theatre located at the Rio del Duca, between Campo San Samuele and Campo Santo Stefano, in Venice. One of several important theatres built in that city by the Grimani family, the theatre opened in 1656 and operated continuously until a fire destroyed the theatre in 1747. A new structure was built and opened in 1748, but financial difficulties forced the theatre to close and be sold in 1770. The theatre remained active until 1807 when it was shut down by Napoleonic decree. It reopened in 1815 and was later acquired by impresario Giuseppe Camploy in 1819. In 1853 the theatre was renamed the Teatro Camploy. Upon Camploy's death in 1889, the theatre was bequeathed to the City of Verona. The Venice City Council in turn bought the theatre and demolished it in 1894.

== History ==
One of the most important Venetian theatres of the 17th and 18th centuries, the Teatro San Samuele was constructed in 1656 through a commission made by the Grimani family a year earlier. Initially the theatre was used primarily for plays but in the 18th century the house became more closely associated with opera and ballet. The famous playwright and librettist Carlo Goldoni notably served as the theatre's director from 1737 to 1741, and many of his works were premiered at the theatre during his career.

The original Teatro San Samuele was destroyed by fire on the last night of September 1747. A new theatre was built in almost identical design and opened in May 1748 as opulent competition for the Teatro San Giovanni Grisostomo. The new theatre became associated with the opera buffa repertoire, as the Grimani family preferred to stage opera seria and other more dramatic works at their other theatre, the Teatro San Benedetto (built 1755).

At the end of the 18th century, the Teatro San Samuele lost much of its former prestige. In 1770 the Grimani family had been forced to sell the theatre due to the economic crisis that hit the Venetian aristocracy. The theatre continued to operate until 6 April 1807 when it was ordered closed by a Napoleonic decree which also shut down the Teatro San Cassiano, the Teatro San Angelo, and the Teatro San Luca. The San Samuele and the San Luca were re-opened after a 21 April 1815 Austrian decree.

In 1819 the Teatro San Samuele was acquired by impresario Giuseppe Camploy. With the exception of the 1840s when performances were sporadic, the theatre remained continuously active until Camploy's death in 1889. In 1853 the theatre was renamed as the Teatro Camploy. In the third edition of Murray's Hand-book for travellers in northern Italy (1847) Sir Francis Palgrave reported "It is a pretty theatre well adapted for hearing. Opera buffas are performed here" In his will, Camploy bequeathed the theatre to the City of Verona. The Venice City Council bought it and, after demolishing the theatre in 1894, built the A. Scarsellini elementary school on the former site of the theatre.

== Selected premieres ==
- L'Artaxerse, dramma per musica in 3 acts, music by Carlo Grossi, libretto by Aurelio Aureli, 28 December 1668.
- Scipione nelle Spagne, dramma per musica in 3 acts, music by Tomaso Albinoni, libretto by Apostolo Zeno, 25 May 1724.
- Dalisa, opera seria, music by Johann Adolf Hasse, libretto by Domenico Lalli after Nicolò Minato, 17 May 1730.
- Griselda, dramma per musica in 3 acts, music by Antonio Vivaldi, libretto by Apostolo Zeno after Giovanni Boccaccio, 18 May 1735.
- La contessina, pasticcio, music by Niccolò Jommelli, libretto by Goldoni, 1743.
- La ritornata di Londra, dramma giocoso in 3 Acts, music by Domenico Fischietti, libretto by Goldoni, 7 February 1756.
- Catone in Utica, opera seria in 3 Acts, music by Florian Leopold Gassmann, libretto by Metastasio, 29 April 1761.
- L'idolo cinese, dramma giocoso in 3 acts, music by Giacomo Rust, libretto by Giovanni Battista Lorenzi, 28 December 1773.
- Le gelosie villane, dramma giocoso in 3 Acts, music by Giuseppe Sarti, libretto by Tommaso Grandi, November 1776.
- Giannina e Bernardone, dramma giocoso in 2 Acts, music by Domenico Cimarosa, libretto by Filippo Livigni, Autumn of 1781.
- La morte di Cesare, opera seria in 3 Acts, music by Francesco Bianchi, libretto by Gaetano Sertor, 27 December 1788.
- Il servo padrone, opera buffa in 2 Acts, music by Niccolò Piccinni, libretto by Caternio Mazzolà, 17 January 1794.
- L'accademia di musica, farsa per music in 1 Act, music by Simon Mayr, libretto by Gaetano Rossi after F. Albergati Capacelli, 24 November 1799.
- Pietro il grande, opera buffa in 2 Acts, music by Gaetano Donizetti, libretto by Gherardo Bevilacqua-Aldobrandini, 26 December 1819.
- Marco Visconti, opera seria in 2 Acts, music by Antonio Pedrocco, libretto by Nicolò Foramiti after Tommaso Grossi, 16 April 1853.

== See also ==
- Opera houses and theatres of Venice
