= List of operas by Simon Mayr =

This is a complete list of operas by Simon Mayr (1763 – 1845); for his other compositions see List of compositions by Simon Mayr.

== List ==
Title	Genre	Acts	Libretto	Premiere date	Place, theatre
Saffo ossia I riti d'Apollo Leucadio	dramma per musica	2 acts	Antonio Simone Sografi	17 February 1794	Venice, La Fenice
La Lodoiska	dramma per musica	3 acts	Francesco Gonella after Claude-François Fillette-Loraux (after Les Amours du chevalier de Faublas by Jean-Baptiste Louvet de Couvray)	26 January 1796	Venice, La Fenice
Un pazzo ne fa cento (also as: I rivali delusi, La contessa immaginaria)	dramma giocoso	2 acts	Giuseppe Foppa after Il conte villano by Domenico Somigli	8 October 1796	Venice, Teatro San Samuele
Telemaco nell'isola di Calipso	dramma per musica	3 acts	Antonio Simone Sografi	16 January 1797	Venice, La Fenice
Il segreto	farsa giocosa	1 act	Giuseppe Foppa	24 September 1797	Venice, Teatro San Moisè
L'intrigo della lettera (also as: Il pittore astratto)	farsa giocosa	1 act	Giuseppe Foppa after L'intrigue épistolaire by Fabre d'Églantine	22 October 1797	Venice, Teatro San Moisè
Avviso ai maritati	dramma giocoso	2 acts	Francesco Gonella	15 January 1798	Venice, Teatro San Samuele
Lauso e Lidia	dramma per musica	2 acts	Giuseppe Foppa after Jean-François Marmontel	14 February (or 14 January) 1798	Venice, La Fenice
Adriano in Siria	dramma per musica	3 acts	Metastasio	23 April (or 23 May) 1798	Venice, Teatro San Benedetto
Che originali! (also as: Il trionfo della musica, Il fanatico per la musica, La musicomania)	farsa	1 act	Gaetano Rossi after La musicomanie by Nicolas-Médard Audinot	18 October 1798	Venice, Teatro San Benedetto
Amor ingegnoso	farsa	1 act	Caterino Mazzolà	27 December 1798	Venice, Teatro San Benedetto
L'ubbidienza per astuzia	farsa	1 act	Caterino Mazzolà	27 December 1798	Venice, Teatro San Benedetto
Adelaide di Guesclino	dramma di sentimento	2 acts	Gaetano Rossi after Voltaire	1 May 1799	Venice, La Fenice; revivals: Prague and Vienna, 1802; Dresden, 1807; Amsterdam, 1817; In German: Frankfurt, 1804; Hamburg, 1815; Würzburg, 1819
Labino e Carlotta (also as: Werter e Carlotta, Sabino e Carlotta)	farsa	1 act	Gaetano Rossi	9 October 1799	Venice, Teatro San Benedetto
L'avaro	farsa	1 act	Gaetano Rossi after Carlo Goldoni	9 October 1799	Venice, Teatro San Benedetto
L'accademia di musica	farsa	1 act	Gaetano Rossi after Francesco Albergati Capacelli	24 November 1799	Venice, Teatro San Samuele
La Lodoiska (revised version 1)	dramma per musica	2 acts	Gaetano Rossi after Claude-François Fillette-Loraux	26 December 1799	Milan, Teatro alla Scala
La Lodoiska (revised version 2)	opera semiseria	2 acts	after Jean-Élie Bédéno Dejaure	1799–1800	Parma
Gli sciti	dramma per musica	2 acts	Gaetano Rossi after Les scythes by Voltaire	21 February 1800	Venice, La Fenice
La locandiera	dramma giocoso	2 acts	Gaetano Rossi after Carlo Goldoni	Spring 1800	Vicenza, Teatro Berico
Il caretto del venditore d'aceto (also as: L'oro fa tutto, L'acetaio, Il barile portentoso)	farsa	1 act	Giuseppe Foppa after La brouette du vinaigrier by Louis-Sébastien Mercier	28 June 1800	Venice, Teatro Sant' Angelo
L'equivoco, ovvero Le bizzarie dell'amore (also as: I due viaggiatori, I castelli in aria ossia Gli amanti per accidente)	dramma giocoso	2 acts	Giuseppe Foppa after Les Châteaux in Espagne by Jean-François Collin d'Harleville	5 November 1800	Milan, Teatro alla Scala; revival: Venice, Teatro San Benedetto, May 1802; Florence, Risoluti (Teatro di via S Maria), Summer 1804
L'imbroglione e il castiga-matti	farsa	1 act	Giuseppe Foppa	19 November 1800	Venice, Teatro San Moisè
Ginevra di Scozia (also as: Ariodante)	dramma serio eroico per musica	2 acts	Gaetano Rossi after Orlando furioso by Ludovico Ariosto	21 April 1801	Trieste, Teatro Nuovo (inaugural opera)
Le due giornate (also as: Il portatore d'acqua)	dramma eroicomico per musica	3 acts	Giuseppe Foppa after Les deux journées by Jean-Nicolas Bouilly	18 August 1801	Milan, Teatro alla Scala
Argene	dramma eroica per musica	2 acts	Gaetano Rossi	16–28 December 1801	Venice, La Fenice
I virtuosi (also as: I virtuosi a teatro)	farsa	1 act	Gaetano Rossi	26 December 1801	Venice, Teatro San Luca
I misteri eleusini (also as: Antinoo in Eleusi, Polibete)	dramma per musica	2 acts	Giuseppe Bernardoni	6 January (or 16 January) 1802	Milan, Teatro alla Scala
Ercole in Lidia	dramma per musica	2 acts	Giovanni de Gamerra	29 January 1803	Vienna, Burgtheater
Gl'intrighi amorosi	dramma giocoso	2 acts	Giovanni Bertati	Carnival 1803	Parma, Ducale
Le finte rivali	melodramma giocoso	2 acts	Luigi Romanelli	20 August 1803	Milan, Teatro alla Scala
Alonso e Cora	dramma per musica	2 acts	Giuseppe Bernardoni after Les Incas by Jean-François Marmontel	26 December 1803	Milan, Teatro alla Scala; revivals: Vienna, 1804; in German: Frankfurt, 1805; new version: Naples, Teatro San Carlo, 1815; in German: Vienna, 1822 (with music by Joseph Weigl)
Amor non ha ritegno (also as: La fedeltà delle verdove)	melodramma eroicomico	2 acts	Francesco Marconi after La donna contraria al consiglio by Carlo Gozzi	18 May 1804	Milan, Teatro alla Scala
Elisa ossia Il monte San Bernardo (also as: Il passagio di monte San Bernardo)	dramma sentimentale per musica	1 act	Gaetano Rossi after Eliza ou Le voyage aux glaciers du Mont St. Bernard by Saint-Cyr	5 July 1804	Venice, Teatro San Benedetto
Zamori, ossia L'eroe dell'Indie	dramma serio per musica	2 acts	Luigi Prividali	10 August 1804	Piacenza
Eraldo ed Emma	dramma eroico per musica	2 acts	Gaetano Rossi	8 January 1805	Milan, Teatro alla Scala
Di locanda in locanda e sempre in sala	farsa	1 act	Luigi Giuseppe Buonavoglia after D'auberge in auberge ou Les préventions by Emmanuel Dupaty	5 June 1805	Venice, Teatro San Moisè
L'amor coniugale (also as: Il custode di buon cuore)	farsa sentimentale	1 act	Gaetano Rossi after Léonore ou L'amour conjugal by Jean-Nicolas Bouilly	26 July 1805	Padua, Teatro Nuovo
La roccia di Frauenstein (also as: Gli emigrati di Franconia)	melodramma eroi-comico	2 acts	Gaetano Rossi after I fuorusciti by Angelo Anelli	26 October 1805	Venice, La Fenice
Gli americani (also as: Idalide)	melodramma eroico	2 acts	Gaetano Rossi	4 January 1806	Venice, La Fenice
Palmira, ossia Il trionfo della virtù e dell'amore	dramma per musica	1 act		Autumn 1806	Florence, Teatro della Pergola
Il piccolo compositore di musica	farsa	2 acts		November 1806	Venice, Teatro San Moisè
Adelasia e Aleramo	melodramma serio	2 acts	Luigi Romanelli	26 December 1806	Milan, Teatro alla Scala; revivals: regularly in Milan until 1820; Vienna, 1807; Munich, 1808; London, 1815; in German: Budapest, 1808; Berlin, 1811
Belle ciarle e tristi fatti (also as: L'imbroglio contro l'imbroglio)	dramma giocoso	2 acts	Angelo Anelli	11 January (or November) 1807	Venice, La Fenice
Nè l'un, nè l'altro	dramma giocoso	2 acts	Angelo Anelli	17 August 1807	Milan, Teatro alla Scala
I cherusci	dramma per musica	2 acts	Gaetano Rossi	Carnival 1808	Rome, Teatro Argentina
Il vero originale	burletta per musica	2 acts	Michelangelo Prunetti	27 February 1808	Rome, Teatro Valle
La finta sposa ossia Il barone burlato	dramma giocoso	2 acts	Brunetti	Spring 1808	Rome, Teatro Valle
Il ritorno di Ulisse	azione eroica per musica	2 acts	Luigi Prividali	26 December 1808	Venice, La Fenice
Il matrimonio per concorso	dramma giocoso	2 acts	after Carlo Goldoni	Carnival 1809	Bologna
Alcide al Bivio	festa teatrale		Metastasio	1809	Bergamo, Instituto Filharmonico
Amore non soffre opposizioni (also as: Amore irresistibile)	dramma giocoso	2 acts	Giuseppe Foppa	24 February 1810	Venice, Teatro San Moisè
Raùl di Créqui	melodramma serio	2 acts	Luigi Romanelli after Raoul, sire de Créqui by Monvel	26 December 1810	Milan, Teatro alla Scala
L'amor filiale (also as: Il disertore)	farsa sentimentale	1 act	Gaetano Rossi after Le déserteur by Michel-Jean Sedaine	11 February 1811	Venice, Teatro San Moisè
Il sacrifizio d'Ifigenia	azione seria drammatica per musica	2 acts	Cesare Arici after François-Louis Gand Le Bland du Roullet	13 April 1811	Brescia, Teatro Grande; revived under the title Ifigenia in Aulide: Palermo, Teatro Carolino, 1820
Tamerlano	melodramma serio	2 acts	Luigi Romanelli after L'orphelin de la Chine by Voltaire and Tamerlan by Étienne Morel de Chédeville	26 December 1812	Milan, Teatro alla Scala
La rosa bianca e la rosa rossa (also as: Il trionfo dell'amicizia)	melodramma eroico	2 acts	Felice Romani after La rose blanche et la rose rouge by René-Charles Guilbert de Pixerécourt	21 February 1813	Genoa, Teatro Sant' Agostino
Medea in Corinto	melodramma tragico	2 acts	Felice Romani after Medea in Corinto by Domenico Morosini	28 November 1813	Naples, Teatro San Carlo; revival: Milan, Teatro alla Scala, 1823; regular revivals in Italy until 1829; Dresden, 1821; Paris, 1823–1826; London, 1826–1837; last performance in the 19th century: London, 1850
Elena (also as: Elena e Costantino)	dramma eroicomico per musica	2 acts	Andrea Leone Tottola	28 January 1814	Naples, Teatro (San Giovanni) dei Fiorentini
Atar, ossia Il serraglio d'Ormus (also as: Il serraglio d'Osmano)	melodramma serio	2 acts	Felice Romani after Tarare by Beaumarchais	18 June 1814	Genoa, Teatro San Agostino
Le due duchesse, ossia La caccia dei lupi (also as: Le due amiche)	dramma semiserio per musica	2 acts	Felice Romani after Edgar ou La chasse aux loups by Louis-Charles Caigniez	7 November 1814	Milan, Teatro alla Scala
Cora (revised as: Alonso e Cora)	dramma per musica	3 acts	Francesco Berio di Salsa after Les Incas by Jean-François Marmontel	26 March 1815	Naples, Teatro San Carlo
Mennone e Zemira (initial title: La figlia dell'aria, ossia La vendetta di Giunone)	dramma per musica	3 acts	Luigi Romani	22 March 1817	Naples, Teatro San Carlo
Amor avvocato	commedia per musica	1 act		Spring 1817	Naples, Teatro (San Giovanni) dei Fiorentini
Lanassa	melodramma eroico	2 acts	Gaetano Rossi and Bartolomeo Merelli after La veuve du Malabar by Antoine-Marin Lemierre	26 December 1817	Venice, La Fenice
Le danaide (also as: Danao)	tragedia lirica	2 acts	Luigi Romani after Ranieri de' Calzabigi	26 December 1818	Rome, Teatro Argentina
Alfredo il grande (Mayr)	melodramma serio	2 acts	Bartolomeo Merelli after Eraldo ed Emma by Gaetano Rossi	26 December 1819	Bergamo, Teatro della Società
Fedra	melodramma serio	2 acts	Luigi Romanelli after Phèdre by Jean Racine	26 December 1820	Milan, Teatro alla Scala
Demetrio	dramma per musica	2 acts	Ludovico Piossasco Feys (?) after Metastasio	27 December 1823	Turin, Teatro Regio
