= List of compositions by Simon Mayr =

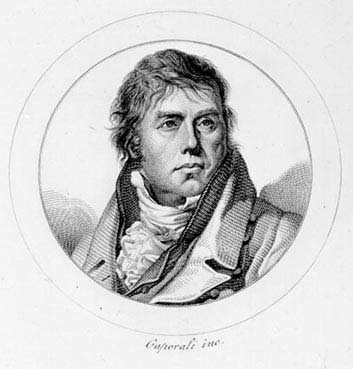

This is a selective list of the compositions by Simon Mayr (1763–1845) who is credited with a total of some 600 compositions, including 70 operas.

== Other secular vocal music ==
=== Cantatas ===
- Femio, ossia La musica custode della fede maritale, cantata for three voices and orchestra, text by Francesco Boaretti, Venice, 1791
- Ero, cantata for voice and orchestra, text by Giuseppe Foppa, Venice, 1793
- Temira e Ariostoo, cantata for four voices and orchestra, Venice, 1795
- Apelle e Campase, Venice, 1795 (lost)
- Le sventure di Leandro, cantata for one voice, chorus and orchestra, text by Comtesse Velo, Vicenza, 1797
- Traiano all'Eufrate, cantata for three voices, chorus and orchestra, text by Angelo Anelli, Milan, 1807
- Alcide al bivio, cantata for voices and orchestra, Bergamo, 1809
- Cantata per la morte di Haydn, cantata for tenor, voices and orchestra, Bergamo, 1809
- Cantata per le nozze di Napoleone con Maria Luisa d'Austria, cantata for three voices, chorus and orchestra, text by Comte Carrara-Spinelli, Bergamo, 1810
- Ferramondo, cantata for voices, chorus and orchestra, text by Comte Carrara-Spinelli, Bergamo, 1810
- Cantata per la nascita del re di Roma, cantata for three voices, chorus and orchestra, Bergamo, 1811
- Numa Pompilio, cantata for voices, chorus and orchestra, text by Muletti, Bergamo, 1811
- Cantata per la nascita del re di Roma, cantata for soprano, harp and orchestra, Bergamo, 1811
- Arianna in Nasso, cantata for one voice and orchestra, Naples, 1815
- Egeria, cantata for voices, chorus and orchestra, text by C. Arici, Brescia, 1816
- Annibale, cantata for tenor and orchestra, Bergamo, 1816
- Lo spavento, cantata for tenor and orchestra, Bergamo, 1816
- La tempesta, cantata for tenor and orchestra, Bergamo, 1816
- Le feste d'Ercole, cantata for voices, chorus and orchestra, Bergamo, 1816
- L'armonia, Bergamo, 1816
- Il sogno di Partenope, melodramma allegorico, text by Urbano Lampredi, Naples, 1817
- Arianna e Bacco, cantata for voices, chorus and orchestra, Bergamo, 1817
- Cantata per la morte di Antonio Capuzzi, cantata for 2 voices, chorus and orchestra, text by Muletti, Bergamo, 1818
- Inno a Pallade, text by Vincenzo Monti, Milan, 1820 (lost)
- Piccola cantata, cantata for 3 voices, chorus and orchestra, Bergamo, 1822
- Innalzamento al trono del giovane re Gioas, cantata for soprano, tenor, bass and orchestra, 1822
- La vita campestre, cantata for tenor and orchestra, Bergamo, 1823
- L'autunno, 1824
- L'armonia, dramatic cantata, Bergamo, Teatro Ricciardi, 1825
- Cantata per la morte di Beethoven, cantata for soprano, tenor, bass, chorus and orchestra, Bergamo, 1827
- Schiera di fausti eventi, cantata for 4 voices, chorus and orchestra, Bergamo, 1838

Additionally, there were five other cantatas for several soloists, plus 31 cantatas for a single voice.

=== Other vocal music ===
- 40 chansons, mélodies, arias
  - 12 Lieder (1786, Regensburg)
  - 12 ballades vénitiennes (1797, London)
  - 6 canzonette et duettini (Vienna)
  - Canzoni in Italian and German

== Church music ==
=== Oratorios and sacred dramas ===
- Iacob a Labano fugiens, oratorio in Latin, libretto by Giuseppe Foppa, Venice, 1791
- Sisara, oratorio in Latin, libretto by Giuseppe Foppa, Venice, 1793
- Tobia, o Tobiae matrimonium, oratorio in Latin, Venice, 1794
- La Passione, oratorio in Italian, Forlì, 1794
- David in spelunca Engaddi, oratorio in Latin and Italian, for 5 female soloists, chorus and orchestra, libretto by Giuseppe Foppa, Venice, 1795
- Il sagrifizio di Jefte, oratorio in Italian, Forlì, 1795 [Naxos CD 8.572719-20]
- Il ritorno di Jefte, o Il voto incauto, oratorio in Italian, libretto by Jacopo Ferretti, Rome, 1814 (lost)
- Gioas salvato, oratorio in Italian, Palermo, 1816-17 (lost)
- Ifigenia in Tauride, azione sacra drammatica per musica in forma scenica, after Apostolo Zeno, Florence, 1817 (lost)
- Samuele, oratorio in two parts in Italian, libretto by Bartolomeo Merelli, Bergamo, 1821
- Atalia, dramma sacro per musica con apparato scenico, libretto by Felice Romani, Naples, 1822
- San Luigi Gonzaga, oratorio in Italian, libretto by P. Cominazzi, Bergamo, 1822

=== Other religious music ===
- 18 masses, including:
  - Mass in C minor for soloists, chorus and orchestra, 1826
- 7 requiems, including:
  - Grande Messa da Requiem, 1815
- 43 hymns
- 14 antiphons
- 29 compositions for Holy Week
- 13 motets

== Instrumental music ==
=== Symphonic music ===
- 57 symphonies
- 2 symphony concertantes
- 2 concertos for pianoforte
- 2 ballets
- 3 intermezzi
- 3 marches

=== Chamber music ===
- 3 sonatas for pianoforte and other instruments
- 8 sonatas à 6 for wind instruments
- 13 septets for wind instruments
- 3 octets wind instruments
- 2 septets for strings and wind instruments
- Quintet for strings

=== Keyboard works ===
- 4 sonatas
- 10 symphonies
- 58 études
- 10 divertimenti
- Sonata for organ
- 2 symphonies for organ
