= David in spelunca Engaddi =

David in spelunca Engaddi (“David in the Cave of Engedi”) is a 1795 oratorio by Simon Mayr. The librettist is unknown, but is possibly Giuseppe Maria Foppa who supplied the Latin texts for Iacob a Labano fugiens (1791), Sisara (1793), and Tobiae matrimonium (1794).

== Recordings ==
- David in spelunca Engaddi - Merit Ostermann, Cornelia Horak, Ai Ichihara, Sibylla Duffe, Clàudia Schneider, Simon Mayr Choir, Simon Mayr Ensemble, Franz Hauk. 2CDs Naxos 2008
