= Elena Tsallagova =

Russian operatic soprano

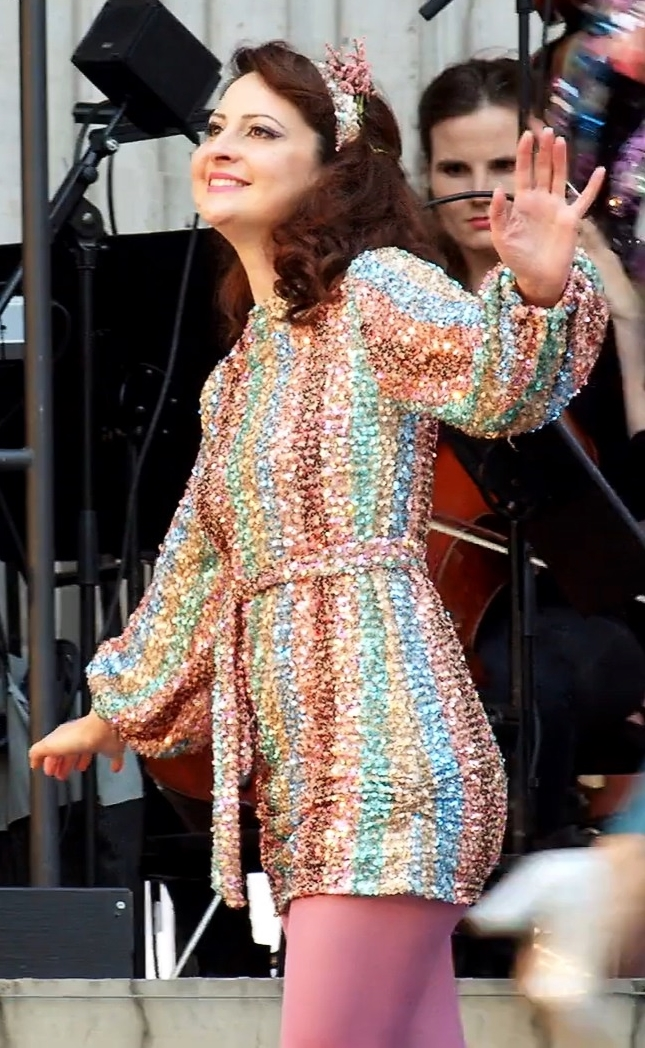
- Tsallagova as Woglinde in Das Rheingold at the Deutsche Oper Berlin in 2020
- Born: Vladikavkaz, Russia
- Education: Saint Petersburg Conservatory
- Occupation: Operatic soprano
- Organizations: Bavarian State Opera; Deutsche Oper Berlin

Elena Tsallagova is a Russian operatic soprano who has performed at major opera houses and festivals in Europe. She was noticed internationally as Nanetta in Verdi's Falstaff at the Glyndebourne Festival, and in the title role of Janáček's The Cunning Little Vixen at the Paris Opera. She has been a member of Deutsche Oper Berlin since 2013, performing lead roles such as Debussy's Mélisande, Gilda in Verdi's Rigoletto and Sophie in Der Rosenkavalier by Richard Strauss.

== Career ==
Tsallagova was born in Vladikavkaz to an Ossetian family. Her father was a singer in an opera chorus, and her mother a choral conductor. She took ballet training from age five to 15 and intended to become a dancer. She studied voice at the Saint Petersburg Conservatory. She won first prize in the Rachmaninov competition there, and began performing at the Mariinsky Theatre. She moved to France to study with Ileana Cotrubaș for two months. In 2006, she was accepted to the Atelier Lyrique, the opera studio of the Paris Opera. She first appeared at the Salzburg Festival in 2007, as Zelmira in Haydn's Armida. The same year, she performed at the Ravenna Festival as Livietta in Cimarosa's Il ritorno di Don Calandrino, conducted by Riccardo Muti. In 2008, she appeared in the title role of Janáček's The Cunning Little Vixen at the Paris Opera, in a performance recorded on a DVD that received a Victoires de la Musique award in 2009.

She was a member of the Bavarian State Opera in Munich from 2008, where she appeared as Despina in Mozart's Così fan tutte, Zerlina in Don Giovanni, Sophie in Massenet's Werther, Nannetta in Verdi's Falstaff, Musetta in Puccini's La Bohème, Creusa in Simon Mayr's Medea in Corinto, Isotta in Die schweigsame Frau by Richard Strauss, and Donna Clara in Zemlinsky's Der Zwerg. In 2009, she performed as Nannetta with the Glyndebourne Touring Opera.

In 2012, she made her role debut as Mélisande in Debussy's Pelléas et Mélisande (opera) at the Paris Opera. She became a member of the Deutsche Oper Berlin with the 2013/14 season where she appeared as Pamina in Mozart's Die Zauberflöte, Gilda in Verdi's Rigoletto, Micaela in Bizet's Carmen, Sophie in Der Rosenkavalier by Strauss, and as Adina in Donizetti's L'elisir d'amore.

In 2022, she was the Vixen again in a production of the Bavarian State Opera, directed by Barrie Kosky and conducted by Mirga Gražinytė-Tyla. A reviewer described her voice as lyric with a capacity for expansion and almost electric vocal energy ("... mit vokaler Energie geradezu elektrisch auflädt"), and her acting as completely natural, and interesting when only looking around a corner ("eine Darstellerin, die sich vollkommen natürlich entfalten kann, die interessiert, sobald sie nur um die Bühnenecke lugt").

== Recordings ==
- Mayr: Medea in Corinto. Munich, 2010, DVD directed by Hans Neuenfels. Nadja Michael, Ramón Vargas, Alastair Miles, Alek Shrader, Elena Tsallagova, choir and orchestra of the Bavarian State Opera conducted by Ivor Bolton. Arthaus 2010 OCLC 871486201, OCLC 956370288
- Debussy's Pelléas et Mélisande. Paris, 2012, DVD directed by Robert Wilson. Orchestre de l'Opéra national de Paris, Philippe Jordan conducting, Stéphane Degout (Pelléas); Elena Tsallagova (Mélisande); Vincent Le Texier (Golaud); Anne Sofie von Otter (Geneviève); Franz-Josef Selig (Arkel); Julie Mathevet (The little Ynold); Jérôme Varnier. Naive # 2159 OCLC 849518086
- Zemlinsky: Der Zwerg. Berlin, 2020, DVD directed by Tobias Kratzer. Elena Tsallagova, David Butt Philip, Emily Magee, Philipp Jekal, choir and orchestra of Deutsche Oper Berlin conducted by Donald Runnicles. Naxos Cat: NBD0108V. OCLC 1252973458 Nominated for a Grammy Award in 2021.
