= Sisara =

Sisara or Si Sara (Persian: سي سرا) may refer to:

== Places ==
- Si Sara, Gilan, Iran
- Sisara, Mazandaran, Iran
- Sisara, an ancient settlement in the Province of Burgos, Spain, according to the Greek historian Ptolemy

== Music ==
- Sisara (Mayr), 1793 oratorio by Simon Mayr about the biblical story

== See also ==
- Sisera, also spelled Sísara, a commander of the Canaanite army of King Jabin of Hazor, mentioned in Judges 4–5 of the Hebrew Bible
