= Sisara (Mayr) =

1793 Latin oratorio

Sisara is a 1793 Latin oratorio by Simon Mayr to a libretto by Giuseppe Foppa who also supplied the Latin texts for Iacob a Labano fugiens (1791) and Tobiae matrimonium (1794).

== Recording ==
- Sisara Sisara – Vanessa Barkowski (mezzo-soprano), Jahel – Talia Or (soprano), Debbora, Thamar – Stefanie Braun (soprano) Barac, Elcana – Petra van der Mieden (soprano), Abra, Dina – Claudia Schneider (soprano) Simon Mayr Choir. Accademia I Filarmonici di Verona. Franz Hauk 2004 Guild 2CD
