= San Lazzaro dei Mendicanti =

Church building in Venice, Italy

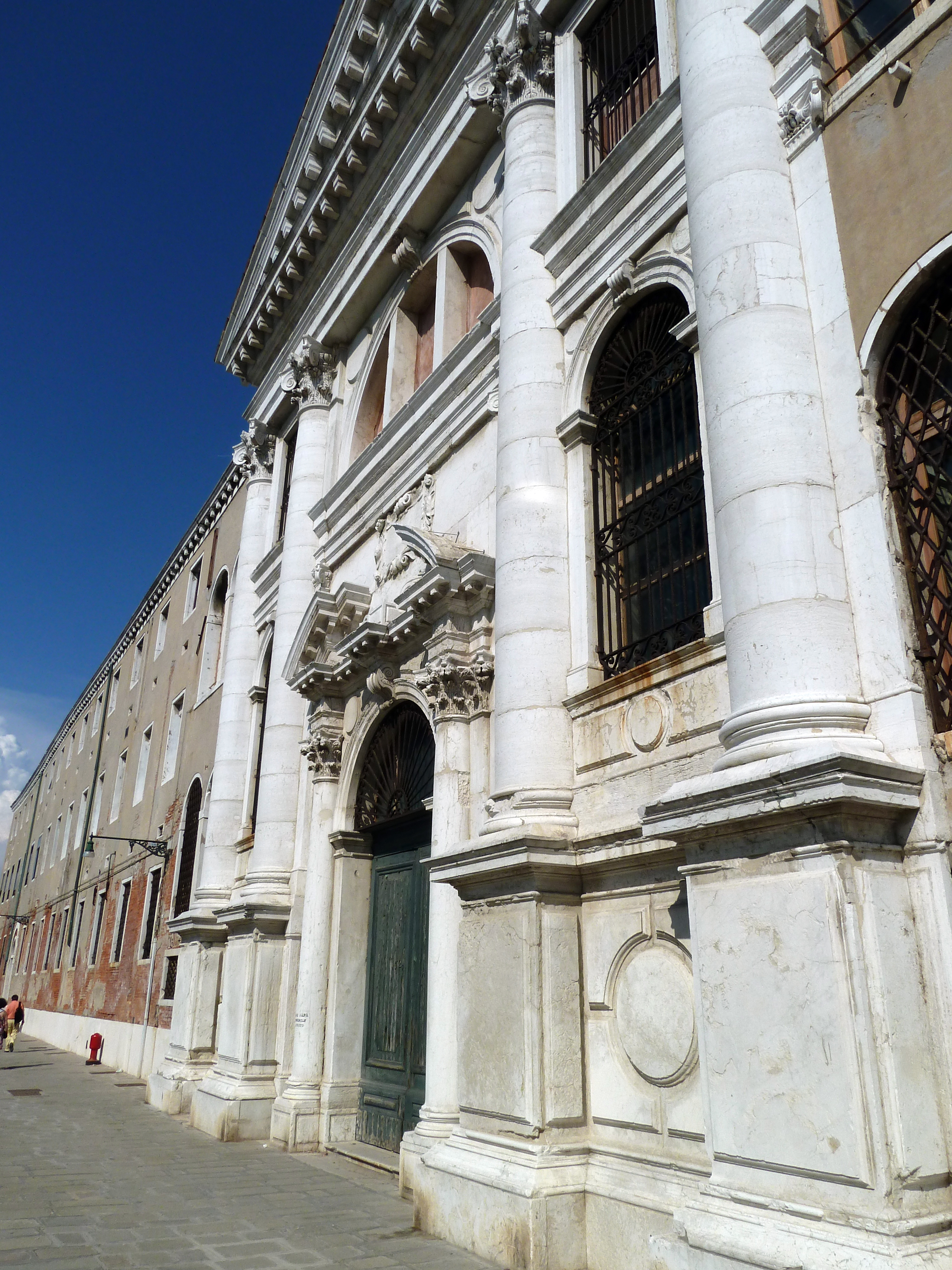

- Location within Venice Location within Italy

Religion
- Affiliation: Roman Catholic
- Diocese: Veneto
- Province: Venice
- Year consecrated: 1636

Location
- Location: Venice, Italy
- Coordinates: 45.44117°N 12.34265°E

Architecture
- Architects: Vincenzo Scamozzi and Giuseppe Sardi
- Type: Church
- Style: Baroque
- Groundbreaking: 1601
- Completed: 1673

San Lazzaro dei Mendicanti is an ancient church in the sestiere of Castello, Venice, northern Italy, with a facade facing a Rio of the same name. It now serves as the chapel of the Civic Hospital of Venice.

== History ==
By 1224, a hospital for lepers, dedicated to St Lazarus, patron saint of those afflicted with the disease, was found adjacent to the church of San Trovaso in the sestiere of Dorsoduro. In 1262, a Leper Colony was quarantined to an island in the Lagoon, then called Isola di San Lazzaro.

In 1500, funds left over after the construction of the Basilica of Santi Giovanni e Paolo, were allocated to build an adjacent leper Hospital of San Lazaro, Ospedale di San Lazaro e dei Mendicanti. It was one of the four main hospitals (Ospedali Grandi) in Venice. The term Mendicanti could be derived from two sources: first in 1601, the Mendicant Friars commissioned building of this church from the architect Vincenzo Scamozzi. Second, the hospital appears to have served as a shelter for beggars (mendicanti), as well as lepers.

The father of Antonio Vivaldi taught violin at the music school here from 1689 to 1693. Like the Ospedale della Pietà, it took in abandoned girls who studied music and were trained to sing and play. The church still has a metal grille behind which the orphan girls (figlie del coro in Italian) sang.

For this church, the composer Simon Mayr wrote the oratorios Sisara (based on story of Sisera 1793), Tobiae matrimonium (1794) and David in spelunca Engaddi (1795).

== Description ==
Completed by 1631, the nave has no flanking aisles, but does have choir galleries. Scamozzi also designed the cloister of the adjacent hospital. The canal-facing facade, designed by Antonio Sardi, was not completed until 1673 by his son Giuseppe. The south side of the bell-tower has a sundial.

In the interior, the right wall, is a Crucifixion and Virgin and St John by Veronese, and in the second altar is a Saint Ursula and the 11 thousand Virgins by Tintoretto. The church contains the ornate funeral monument, completed by Sardi, and dedicated to the condottiero Tommaso Alvise Mocenigo, represented as the admiral who died defending the then-Venetian Candia (Crete) from the Ottomans in 1654, during the Cretan War (1645–1669). Other funeral monuments were designed by Baldassare Longhena. The church also has a funeral monument for a member of the Rezzonico family. The interior decoration (1634–37) was designed by Francesco Contin.

== Sources ==
- Derived from Italian Wikipedia entry.
- Churches of Venice Website
- Venice Tourism site
