= Arianna in Nasso =

Arianna in Nasso may refer to:

- Arianna in Nasso (Mayr)
- Arianna in Nasso (Porpora)
