= Der Zwerg =

- Opera by Alexander von Zemlinsky
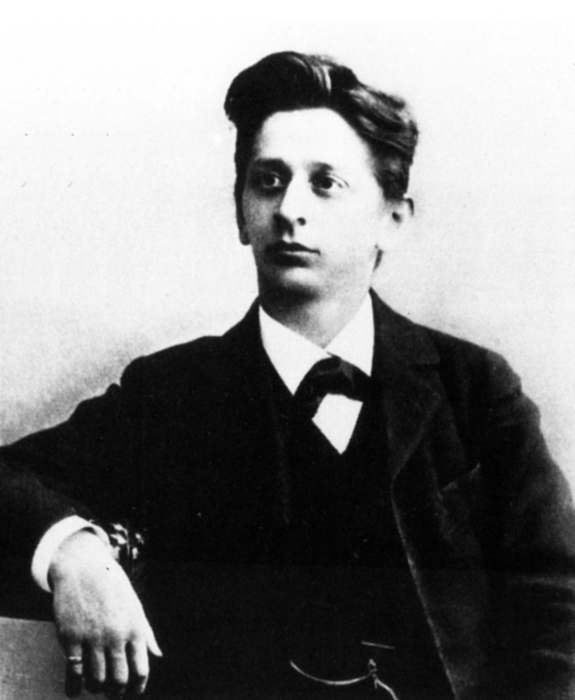
- The composer in 1908
- Translation: The Dwarf
- Librettist: Georg C. Klaren
- Language: German
- Based on: "The Birthday of the Infanta" by Oscar Wilde
- Premiere: 22 May 1922; Stadttheater Glockengasse, Cologne

Der Zwerg (The Dwarf), Op. 17, is an opera in one act by Austrian composer Alexander von Zemlinsky to a libretto by Georg C. Klaren, freely adapted from the short story "The Birthday of the Infanta" by Oscar Wilde.

== Composition history ==
Zemlinsky's choice of this story was a reflection of the end of his relationship with Alma Mahler, and the identification he felt with the drama's main character. He completed the short score in December 1919 and the orchestration in January 1921. The score was published by Universal Edition Vienna.

== Performance history ==
The opera's premiere took place on 28 May 1922 at the Stadttheater Glockengasse in Cologne, Germany, under the baton of Otto Klemperer. Further productions followed in Vienna, Karlsruhe and Prague. Its last performance in Zemlinsky's lifetime was in September 1926 at the Städtische Oper in Berlin-Charlottenburg. The work runs for approximately 90 minutes and is usually paired with another work when performed.

In 1981, the Hamburg State Opera presented the first double-bill of Zemlinsky's two one-act operas Der Zwerg and Eine florentinische Tragödie. Der Zwerg, however, was presented in an abridged version with a substantially altered libretto under the title The Birthday of the Infanta.

The first modern performances of the opera as Zemlinsky intended were given in Cologne in February 1996 under the direction of James Conlon. Conlon later staged the opera in Los Angeles Opera in 2008.

In 2004 'Der Zwerg' was one of the 'Eight Little Greats' season given by Opera North.

In 2013, the Opéra national de Lorraine in Nancy, who had previously presented Zemlinsky's Der König Kandaules and Eine florentinische Tragödie, continued its exploration of his work with Der Zwerg, presented under the French title Le nain with Erik Fenton as the Dwarf, Helena Juntuen as the Infanta, Eleanore Marguerre as Ghita and Pley Bryjak as Don Estoban. The staging was by Philipp Himmelmann with sets by Raimund Bauer and costumes by Bettina Walter. The success of the performances in Nancy led to another adaptation in France in 2018 at the Opera de Rennes.

Numi Opera Theatre's inaugural season presented Der Zwerg with excerpts from Oscar Wilde's "Birthday of the Infanta" in Los Angeles in 2019.

In November 2022, Cologne Opera commemorated the centenary of the work's premiere there with a new production directed by Paul-Georg Dittrich and conducted by Lawrence Renes.

== Roles ==
Roles, voice types, premiere cast
Role	Voice type	Premiere cast, 28 May 1922 (Conductor: Otto Klemperer)
Donna Clara, the Infanta	soprano	Erna Schröder
Ghita, her attendant	soprano	Käthe Herwig
Don Estoban, the chamberlain	bass	Hubert Mertens
The Dwarf	tenor	Karl Schröder
First Maid	soprano	Hedwig Werle
Second Maid	soprano	Hedwig Hertel
Third Maid	alto	Agnes Achnitz
Friends of the Infanta	sopranos and altos	Johanna Klemperer, Else Karsten, Adelheid Wollgarten

== Synopsis ==
The story is an adaptation of "The Birthday of the Infanta" by Oscar Wilde and takes place at the birthday party of the Spanish crown princess (the Infanta) Donna Clara. It is a powerful journey of innocence, illusion, and heartbreak.

A sultan has sent a dwarf as a present to the Infanta on her birthday. The dwarf is unaware of his physical deformity and becomes infatuated with the Infanta. He sings her a love song and imagines himself her brave knight. She toys with him and gives him a white rose as a present, which he mistakes for a sign of affection. As the Infanta left for the dance, he discovers a mirror and sees his reflection for the first time. The dwarf is horrified. In great agitation, he begs the Infanta for her love and a kiss, but she rejects him, calling him a monster. Heartbroken and clutching the rose, he dies as the Infanta rejoins the party. The party continues, symbolizing societal cruelty and his own shattered self-perception.

== Instrumentation ==
- 3 flutes (2nd and 3rd doubling piccolo), 3 oboes (3rd doubling English horn), 3 clarinets in B♭/A (2nd doubling E♭ clarinet, 3rd doubling bass clarinet), 3 bassoons (3rd doubling contrabassoon);
- 4 horns, 3 trumpets, 3 trombones, bass tuba;
- timpani, percussion (cymbals, bass drum, side drum, triangle, tambourine, tam-tam, xylophone, glockenspiel), harp, celesta, guitar, mandolin;
- strings

Offstage music: 3 trumpets; clarinet in C, bassoon, 2 horns, tambourine, mandoline, strings

== Recordings ==
- Soile Isokoski, David Kuebler, Iride Martinez, Andrew Collis, Juanita Lascarro, Machiko Obata, Anne Schwanewilms, Frankfurter Kantorei, Gürzenich-Orchester Köln, James Conlon. EMI Classics (live recording), 1996.
- Zemlinsky: Der Zwerg and Viktor Ullmann: Der zerbrochene Krug, Los Angeles Opera 2008, conductor: James Conlon, stage director: Darko Tresnjak. Arthaus Musik blu-ray and DVD.
- Elena Tsallagova, David Butt Philip, Emily Magee, Philipp Jekal, Deutsche Oper Berlin 2019, conducted by Donald Runnicles, Tobias Kratzer, stage director. Video recording, Naxos Cat: NBD0108V, 2020.
