= La passione (Mayr) =

La passione di Gesù Cristo, is a 1794 Italian-language oratorio for soloists, choir and orchestra by Simon Mayr, to an adapted version of the famous libretto La passione di Gesù Cristo by Metastasio. Unlike Mayr's four Latin-language oratorios to librettos by Giuseppe Foppa for the Conservatorio dei Mendicanti, La passione was written for a church, and not limited to girls voices.

== Recordings ==
- La passione, with Stabat Mater in C Minor for four voices and orchestra Maria Jette (soprano) Claudia Schneider (contralto) Hartmut Schröder (tenor) Robert Merwald (bass) Vokalensemble Ingolstadt Georgisches Kammerorchester Ingolstadt. Franz Hauk, director and harpsichord Recorded 7, 9, 10 April 2001 . Guild
