= Le due duchesse, ossia La caccia dei lupi =

Opera by Simon Mayr

Le due duchesse, ossia La caccia dei lupi is an 1814 opera in 2 acts, a dramma semiserio per musica, by Johann Simon Mayr to a libretto by Felice Romani after Edgar ou La chasse aux loups by Louis-Charles Caigniez premiered 7 November 1814 Milan, Teatro alla Scala. The plot is based on a French melodrama set in Saxon England during the reign of King Edgar the Peaceful.

== Recordings ==
- Le due duchesse, ossia La caccia dei lupi 2CD Franz Hauk Naxos
