= Il sagrifizio di Jefte (Mayr) =

Il sagrifizio di Jefte is a 1795 oratorio by Simon Mayr to a libretto by Giuseppe Foppa performed in Forlì.

== Recordings ==
- Il sagrifizio di Jefte. Franz Hauk. 2CD Naxos
