= Nadja Michael =

German soprano

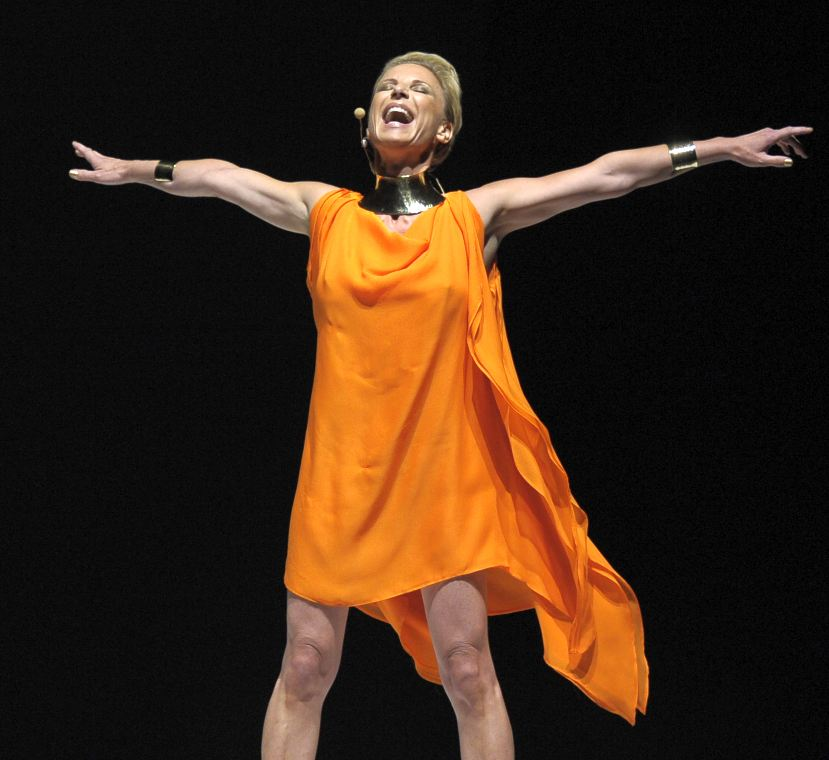
- Michael at StyleNite July 2010
- Born: 1969 (age 56–57); Wurzen, East Germany
- Education: Jacobs School of Music
- Occupation: Opera singer

Nadja Michael (born 1969) is a German opera singer with an active international career singing leading soprano roles. Her mother's great-aunt was the soprano Erna Sack.

== Early life and education ==
She was born near Leipzig in Wurzen, then East Germany. Growing up, she enjoyed singing German folksongs with her family while her mother played the piano. Her grandmother and father both served time in prison for political reasons. Eventually, she escaped to West Germany where she studied music in Stuttgart. Later, she attended the Jacobs School of Music (Indiana University) in the United States.

== Opera career ==
She began her career as a mezzo-soprano but became a soprano in April 2005. Michael has appeared at La Scala (Salome, 2007), Royal Opera House, Covent Garden (Salome, 2008), Vienna State Opera (Fidelio), Arena di Verona, Glyndebourne, Salzburg, Munich (Macbeth and Medea in Corinto), Brussels (Médée, 2008), Chicago (Macbeth, 2010), Berlin (Wozzeck, under Daniel Barenboim, 2011), and San Francisco Opera (Salome, 2009 and The Makropulos Case, 2016).

In 2012, Michael made her Metropolitan Opera debut, as Lady Macbeth, opposite Thomas Hampson and Dimitri Pittas. In 2015 she returned to the company as Judith in Bluebeard's Castle of Béla Bartók.

In 2018, the soprano appeared in Macbeth for Europa Galente.

== Personal life ==
She resides in Berlin and founded a charity, Stimme fur die Menschlichkeit (Voice for Humanity).

== Videography ==
- Bizet: Carmen (Teatro di San Carlo, Naples; Amsellem, Larin, G. Baker; Oren, Corsicato, 2001) [live] Planeta de Agostini
- Verdi: Don Carlos [as Princesse Eboli] (Vienna State Opera, Vienna; Tamar, Vargas, Skovhus, Miles; de Billy, Konwitschny, 2003) [live] TDK
- Puccini: Tosca (Bregenzer Festspiele; Todorovich, Saks; Schirmer, Breisach, 2007) [live] Naxos
- Strauss: Salome (La Scala; Vermillion, Bronder, Struckmann; Harding, Bondy, 2007) [live] TDK
- Strauss: Salome (Royal Opera House; T.Moser, Volle; P.Jordan, McVicar, 2008) [live] Opus Arte
- Mayr: Medea in Corinto (Bavarian State Opera; Vargas, Miles; Bolton, Neuenfels, 2010) [live] Arthaus
- Cherubini: Médée (La Monnaie, Brussels; van Kerckhove, Stotijn, Streit, Le Texier; Rousset, Warlikowski, 2011) Bel Air Classiques
