= Demetrio (Mayr) =

Opera by Simon Mayr

Demetrio, Re di Siria is an 1823 Italian language opera by Mayr, staged in Turin. It was Mayr's last opera, followed only by the Oratorio Gioas in 1824. The libretto is a revision of Metastasio's 1732 libretto originally set by Hasse.

== Recordings ==
- Demetrio, Re di Siria, Amaya Domínguez - mezzo-soprano (Alceste/Demetrio), Bénédicte Tauran soprano (Cleonice), Piotr Friebe (Olinto), Elizabeth Bailey (Barsene), Lisandro Abadie (Fenicio), Matteo Mezzaro (Mitrane). Orchestre Symphonique du Jura, Opera Obliqua Stand de Moutier, Facundo Agudin. 2 CDs without libretto. Oehms 2013.
