= I cherusci =

Opera by Simon Mayr

I cherusci is a dramma per musica in 2 acts by Simon Mayr to a libretto by Gaetano Rossi. It was first performed at the Teatro Argentina, Rome, for Carnival 1808. The plot is at the time of the battles between the Germanic tribes the Marcomanni and Cherusci.

== Cast ==
- Treuta, tenor - popular leader of the Marcomanni people
- Tusnelda, soprano - Treuta's slave, a Cheruscan, but due to be sacrificed by the druids
- Tamaro, soprano - enemy leader of the Cherusci and bards
- Zarasto, bass - high priest of the druids
- Ercilda, soprano - allied with Treuta
- Carilo, tenor - leader of the Sarronides, allied with Treuta
- Dunclamo, tenor - adoptive father of Tusnelda, who later discovers that Treuta is Tusnelda's father
- Araldo, tenor

== Recording ==
- I cherusci Bayerische Staatsoper, Franz Hauk. Naxos 2CD 2019
