= Che originali! =

Opera by Simon Mayr

Che originali! is a 1798 farsa in one act by Simon Mayr for the Teatro San Benedetto. The libretto by Gaetano Rossi was based on an earlier French farce from 1779. It was the earliest of Mayr's works to be widely produced.

== Recording ==
- Thomas Gropper (Don Febeo), Stefanie Früh (Aristea), Gisela Gropper, Stephen Caira (Don Carolino), Robert Merwald (Biscroma) Georgisches Kammerorchester, Franz Hauk, 2CD Guild
