= Iacob a Labano fugiens =

Iacob a Labano fugiens is a 1791 oratorio by Simon Mayr to a libretto by Giuseppe Maria Foppa for the Conservatorio dei Mendicanti, Venice.

== Recordings ==
- Iacob a Labano fugiens. Franz Hauk. 1CD Naxos
