= Elena (Mayr) =

Opera by Simon Mayr

Elena also known as Elena e Costantino is an 1814 opera semiseria by Johann Simon Mayr to a libretto by Leone Tottola. The opera premiered in Naples in 1814 and was later adjusted for La Scala in 1816 where Meyerbeer may have heard it using the same plot in Emma di Resburgo. Goethe and Zelter's correspondence makes mention of the sextet in Act 2, as reported by Stendhal.

== Recordings ==
- Elena Julia Sophie Wagner, Daniel Ochoa, Mira Graczyk, Niklas Mallmann, Markus Schäfer, Simon Mayr Chorus, Concerto de Bassus, Franz Hauk Naxos 2021
