= Gianni di Calais =

Opera by Gaetano Donizetti

- Opera by Gaetano Donizetti
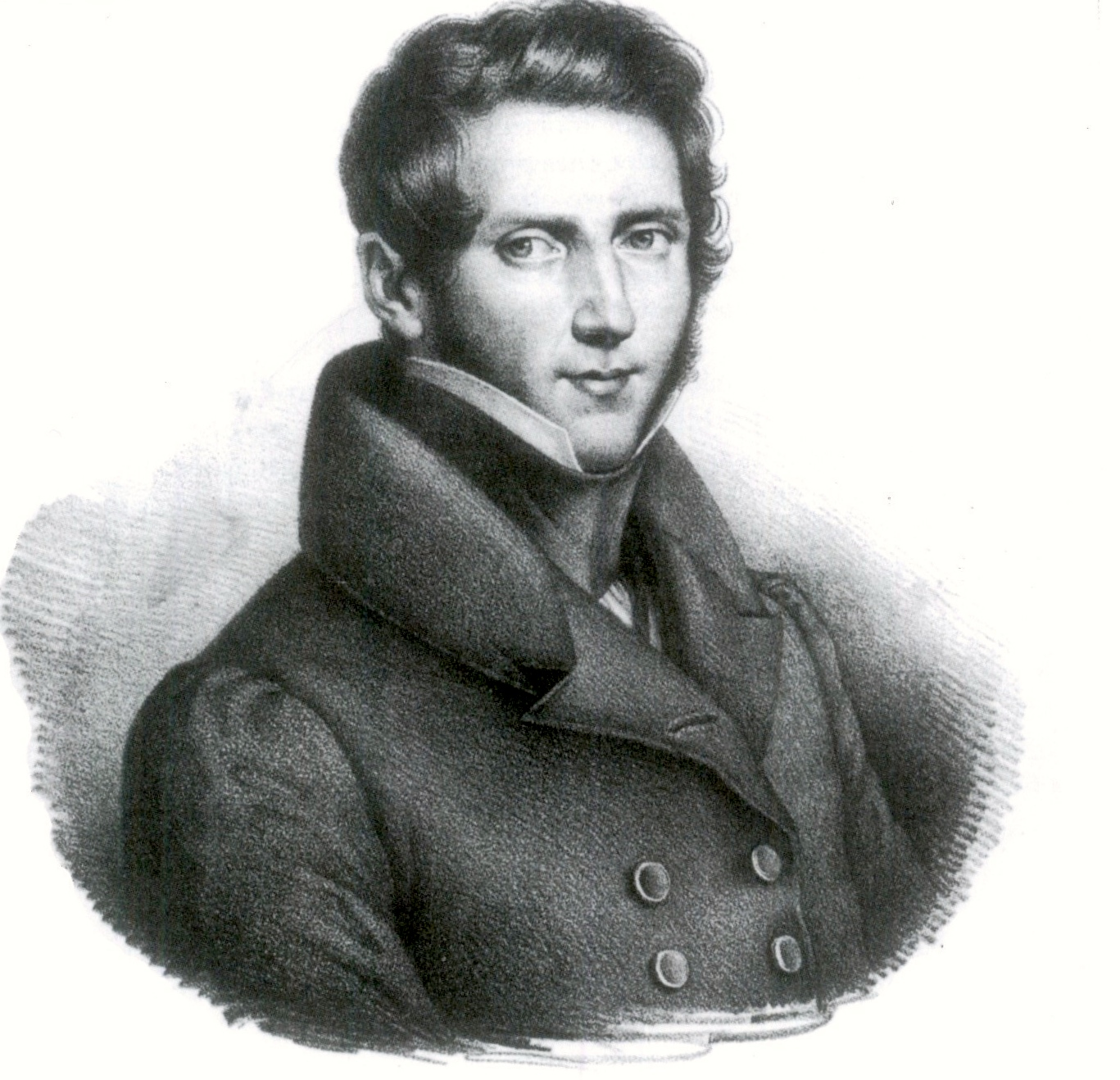
- Donizetti as a young man
- Librettist: Domenico Gilardoni
- Language: Italian
- Based on: Jean de Calais by Louis-Charles Caigniez
- Premiere: 2 August 1828; Teatro del Fondo, Naples

Gianni di Calais is a melodramma semiserio, a "semi-serious" opera in three acts by Gaetano Donizetti (1828), from a libretto by Domenico Gilardoni, based on Jean de Calais by Louis-Charles Caigniez.

It was first performed on 2 August 1828 at the Teatro del Fondo, Naples.

== Roles ==
Role	Voice type	Premiere Cast, 2 August 1828 (Conductor: - )
Metilde, Gianni's wife	soprano	Adelaide Comelli Rubini
Gianni da Calais, shipowner	tenor	Giovanni Battista Rubini
Rustano, head of Gianni's sailors	baritone	Antonio Tamburini
The king, Metilde's father	bass	Michele Benedetti
Arrigo, page of the duchess	contralto	Edvige Ricci
Rogiero	tenor	Filippo Tati
Guido	bass	Giovanni Pace
Corrado, Rogiero's friend	tenor	Gaetano Chizzola
An official	tenor	Capranica
Adelina, duchess and friend of Metilde	soprano	
Ermanno, young son of Gianni	silent	
Sailors, bridesmaids, people

== Synopsis ==
Time: "The past"
Place: Portugal

The Duchess Adelina meets a masked woman with a child on the beach at night. The stranger turns out to be her friend, Princess Matilde, the king's daughter, fleeing to avoid having to marry the courtier Rogiero. During her flight she had fallen into the hands of pirates, but had been rescued by the ship-owner Gianni di Calais, who later became her husband. No one knows that the woman is the king's daughter except Gianni's faithful friend, Rustano. Gianni arrives with the sails of his ship showing images of his wife and son. He has been called to court by the king in order to search for his daughter. It is at this point that Gianni realizes the identity of his wife, and she appears at that moment. When the furious Rogiero sees her, he plans his revenge by kidnapping Gianni's and Matilde's son, but the boy is immediately rescued by Rustano. The king punishes Rogiero, and Gianni is accepted as Matilde's husband.
