= Telemaco (Mayr) =

Opera by Simon Mayr

Telemaco nell'isola di Calipso is dramma per musica opera by Mayr to a libretto by Antonio Simone Sograffi, composed for the Venice Carnival, 1797. The cast featured the castrato Girolamo Crescentini.

== Recordings ==
- Telemaco, conducted by Franz Hauk, Naxo 2017
