= Saffo (Mayr) =

Opera by Simon Mayr

Saffo, ossia I riti d'Apollo Leucadio is a 1794 Italian language opera by Mayr for La Fenice, Venice. The cast featured the castrato Girolamo Crescentini.

== Recordings ==
- Saffo, conducted by Franz Hauk, Naxos
