= Rezzonico =

Rezzonico (pronounced [retˈtsɔːniko]) is an Italian habitational surname. It may refer to:

== People ==
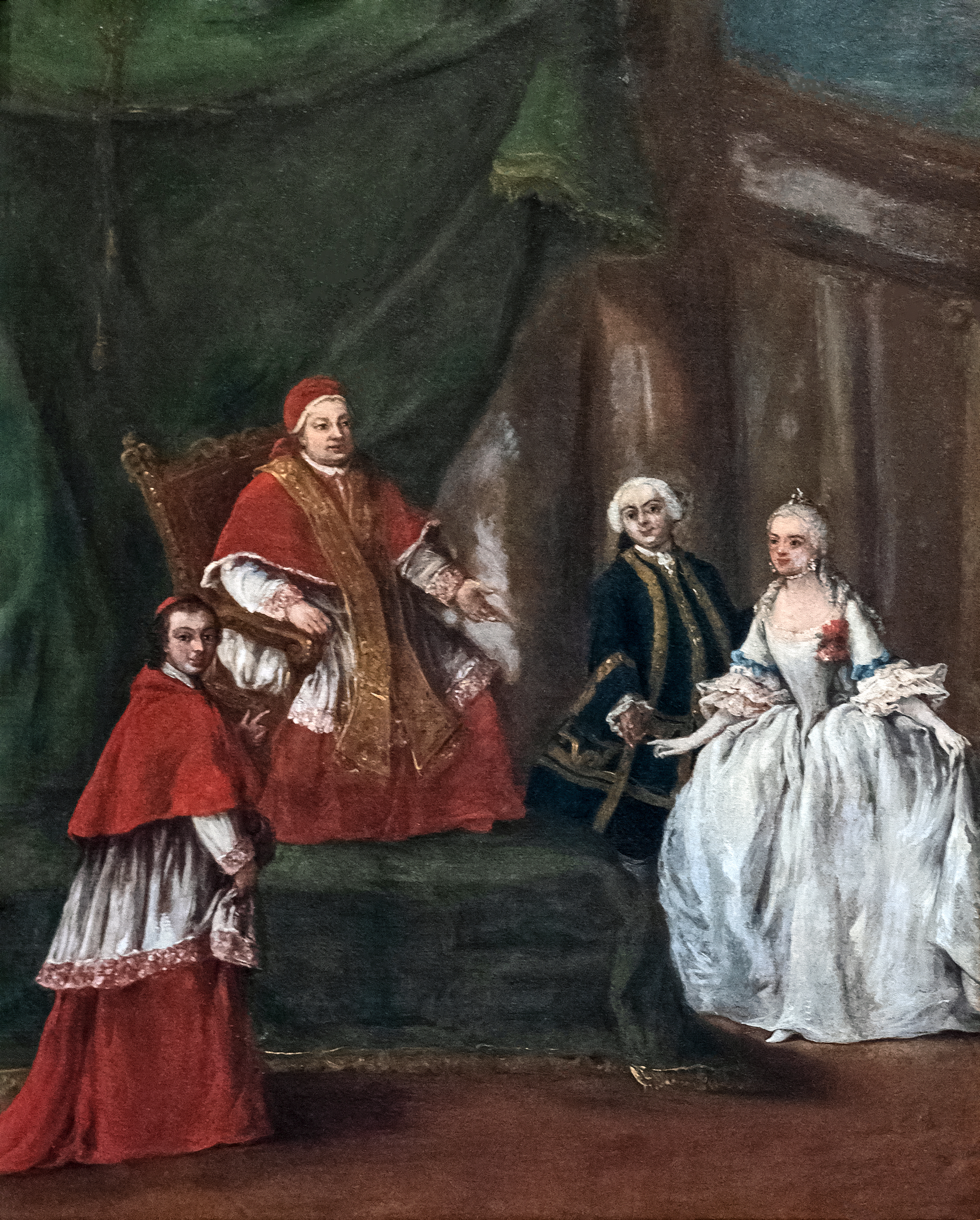
Rezzonico Family Carlo Rezzonico (cardinal) and Clemente XIII

- Carlo della Torre Rezzonico (1693–1769), Venetian Roman Catholic cardinal, later Pope Clement XIII
- Carlo Rezzonico (cardinal) (1724–1799), Clement XIII's nephew and Camerlengo of the Holy Roman Church
- Giovanni Battista Rezzonico (1740–1785), Venetian Roman Catholic cardinal
- Ernesto Torregrossa Rezzonico (born 1992), Venezuelan footballer

== Other uses ==
- Ca' Rezzonico, a historical building on the Grand Canal of Venice, Italy
- Palazzo Fontana Rezzonico, a historical building on the Grand Canal of Venice, Italy
- Portrait of Abbondio Rezzonico (1766), a painting by Pompeo Batoni
- Santa Maria Rezzonico, a former municipality in Lombardy, Italy
- The Best Independent Producer Award – Premio Raimondo Rezzonico, an award of the Locarno Film Festival for the best independent film producers
