= Alfredo il grande (Mayr) =

Opera by Simon Mayr

Alfredo il grande is an 1819 opera, melodramma seria in 2 acts, by Johann Simon Mayr to a libretto by Bartolomeo Merelli after Eraldo ed Emma by Gaetano Rossi. It premiered 26 December 1819 at Bergamo, Teatro della Società.

== Recordings ==
- Alfredo il grande Franz Hauk Naxos
