= Amore non soffre opposizioni =

Opera by Simon Mayr

Amore non soffre opposizioni is an 1810 opera buffa by Simon Mayr for the Teatro San Moisè, Venice. It is written in the new Neapolitan style without recitatives.

== Recordings ==
- Amore non soffre opposizioni. Monika Lichtenegger (Elmira / Zefirina), Laura Faig (Gelmina), Richard Resch (Ernesto), Giulio Alvise Caselli (Argante), Josef Zwink (Martorello) & Philipp Gaiser (Policarpo) East-West European Festival Orchestra, Frank Hauk, 2CD Naxos.
