= Adelaide di Guesclino =

Opera by Simon Mayr

Adelaide di Guesclino is an opera (dramma di sentimento) in two acts composed by Simon Mayr. The Italian libretto by Gaetano Rossi is based on Voltaire's 1734 play Adélaïde du Guesclin. The opera premiered at La Fenice in Venice on 1 May 1799 with Caterina Angiolini in the title role.

== Background and performance history ==
Adelaide di Guesclino premiered on 1 May 1799 at La Fenice in a production designed by Nicola Pellandi and was coupled with the premiere of Giuseppe Antonio Capuzzi's ballet Clotilde. It was Mayr's fifth opera to premiere at La Fenice. Voltaire's play Adélaïde du Guesclin, on which Gaetano Rossi based the libretto, was Voltaire's first play to use French historical characters as protagonists. However, the actual plot was entirely of his own invention. He wrote in a letter some months before the play's premiere, "I have packed in as much I could of love, jealousy, fury, propriety, probity, and grandeur of soul."

Although forgotten now, Mayr's operatic version was very successful in its day. In the years following its premiere it was performed in several Italian cities, including Verona, Modena, Pisa, and Sienna (sometimes titled Carlo duca di Vandomo o sia L'Adelaide or simply Adelaide). The 1808 performance in Siena marked the stage debut of the tenor Giovanni David, whose father and teacher Giacomo David was also in the cast. Outside of Italy, the opera was performed in the original Italian in Vienna and Prague in 1802, in Dresden in 1807, and in Amsterdam in 1817. It was also performed in German as Adelheid von Guesclin in several German cities between 1804 and 1819.

== Roles ==
Roles, voice types, premiere cast
Role	Voice type	Premiere cast, 1 May 1799
Carlo, Duke of Vendôme	tenor	Domenico Mombelli
Ernesto, Duke of Nemours, Carlo's brother	tenor	Bonaventura Palazzi
Adelaide di Guesclino	soprano	Caterina Angiolini
Soffia, confidante of Adelaide	soprano	Rosa Chiener
Couci, Carlo's friend	bass	Giuseppe Cocchi
Mongal, officer in the service of Carlo	tenor	Giuseppe Bertani
Dangeste, friend and confidant of Ernesto	bass	Giovanni Battista Zanardi
Nobles, soldiers, common people

== Synopsis ==
The story is set in Brittany during the Hundred Years' War. Carlo, the Duke of Vendôme is an ally of the English and Edward III, while his brother, Ernesto, Duke of Nemours, is an ally of the Dauphin of France. Ernesto and Adelaide di Guesclino, a Breton noblewoman, are in love, but Carlo is also in love with her. In a rage of jealousy, he orders Ernesto to be killed. In the opera's climax Carlo is overcome by remorse, but then discovers to his joy that his orders have not been carried out.
