= Portrait of Abbondio Rezzonico =

1766 painting by Pompeo Batoni

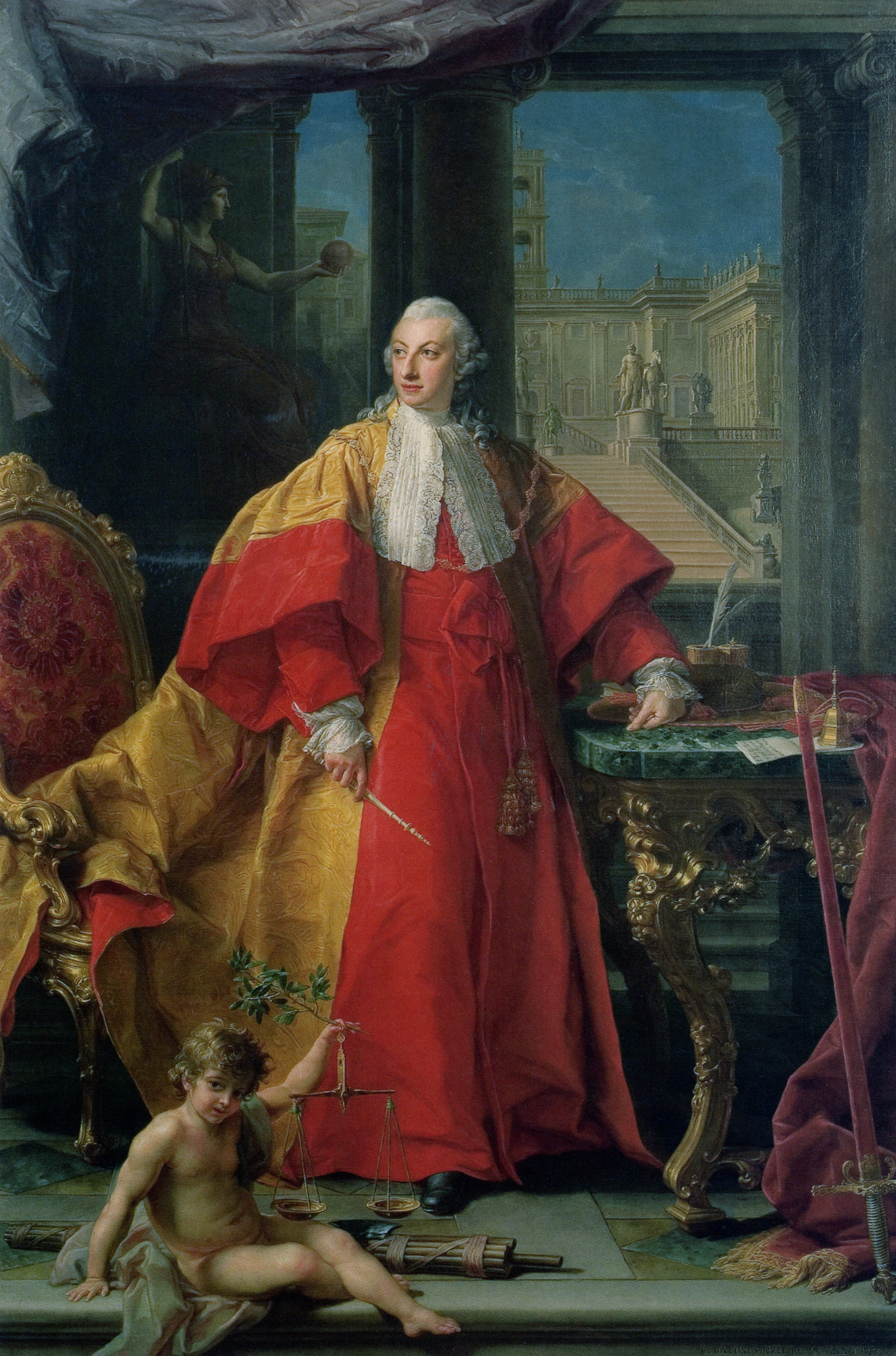
- Artist: Pompeo Batoni
- Year: 1766
- Medium: Oil on canvas
- Dimensions: 300 cm × 200 cm (120 in × 79 in)
- Location: Galleria Nazionale d'Arte Antica; Rome

Portrait of Abbondio Rezzonico is an oil-on-canvas painting by the Italian painter Pompeo Batoni, executed in 1766 and housed in the Pinacoteca of the Galleria Nazionale d'Arte Antica (Palazzo Barberini) in Rome, Italy.

== Description ==
In 1766, Abbondio Rezzonico had been recently appointed to the princely title of Senator of Rome by his uncle, Pope Clement XIII. The civic position was one of the highest civilian magistracies in the Papal State. He is depicted in front of a column, but the background shows the Palazzo Senatorio ("Senatorial Palace") and the Palazzo dei Conservatori on Capitoline Hill, with the statues of the Castor and Pollux, the equestrian statue of Marcus Aurelius, one of the two Trophies of Marius statues on the balustrade, and below a monument added by Pope Innocent XII Pignatelli. The positioning of the statuary has been concentrated and the viewpoint elevated; lacking from the section is the column marking the first mile of Via Appia, added in 1692. In the foreground on the left corner of the painting, behind the senator, is a side view of the statue of Dea Roma, which is in the central niche of the fountain before the senatorial palace.

The senator's attire is rich and complex, with a lace collar, a gold and jewel necklace and a red silk garment with a gold brocade. Around him are symbols of his power and duties. A putti holds the scales of justice with an olive branch in his hand. At the senator's feet are fasces and at his side a sword. He has risen from the chair he was sitting on, and the table before him has a written document and an inkwell, while his hands hold an ivory scepter.

The painting was acquired by the Italian state in 2016 to be exhibited in Palazzo Barberini.
