= La rosa bianca e la rosa rossa =

Opera by Simon Mayr

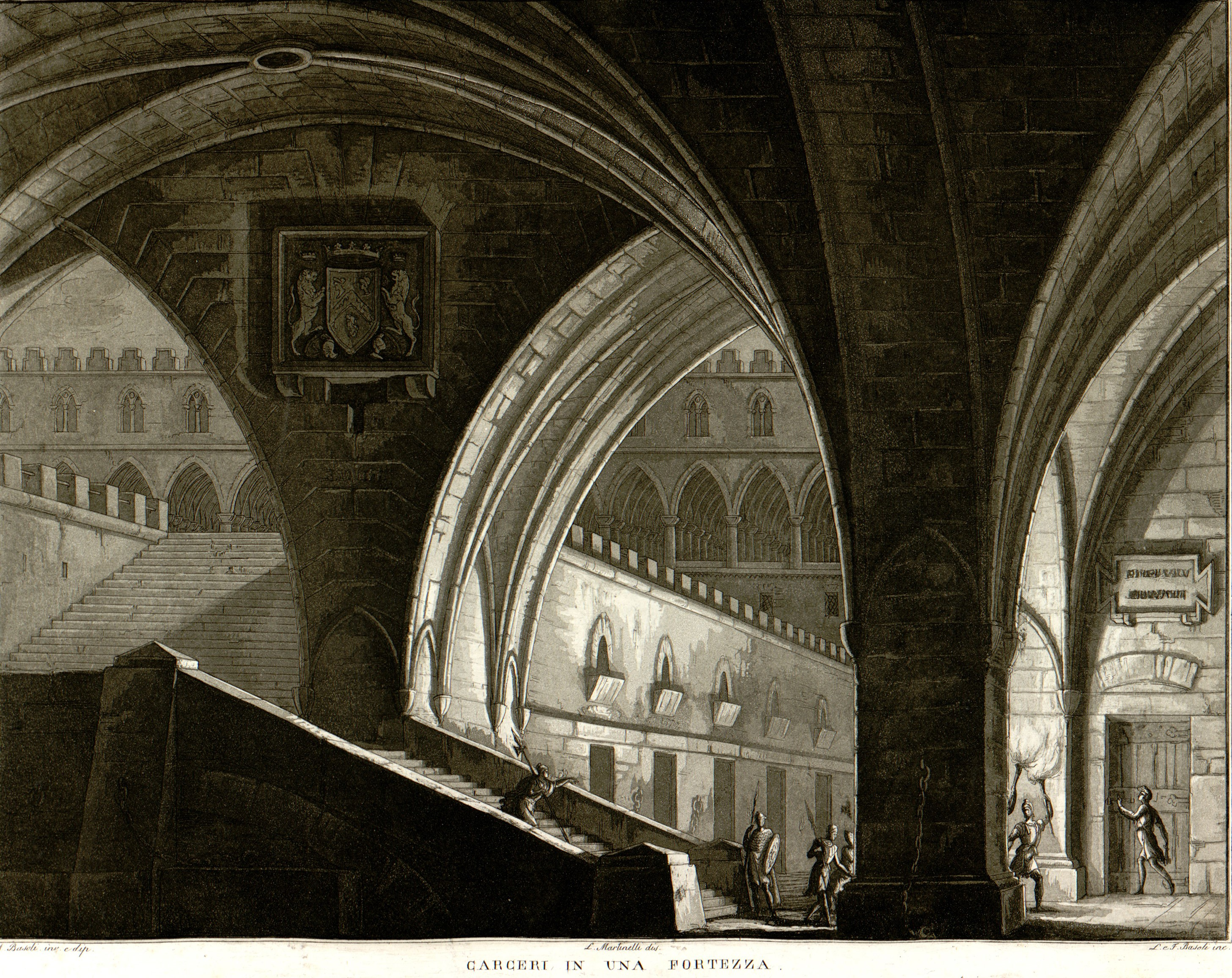
Prison in a fortress, set design by Antonio Basoli for La rosa bianca e la rosa rossa (1819)

La rosa bianca e la rosa rossa (The White Rose and the Red Rose) is an opera in two acts composed by Simon Mayr to an Italian libretto by Felice Romani. It premiered at the Teatro Sant'Agostino, Genoa, on 21 February 1813. Set in England against the backdrop of the Wars of the Roses, Romani's libretto is based on René-Charles Guilbert de Pixérécourt's La rose blanche et la rose rouge. Mayr's opera has also been performed under the title Il trionfo dell'amicizia (The triumph of friendship).

== Recordings ==
- Mayr: La rosa bianca e la rosa rossa – Orchestra Stabile di Bergamo, conducted by Thomas Briccetti with Anna Caterina Antonacci as Clothilde. Label: BMG Ricordi
