= Medea in Corinto =

Opera by Simon Mayr

- Opera by Simon Mayr
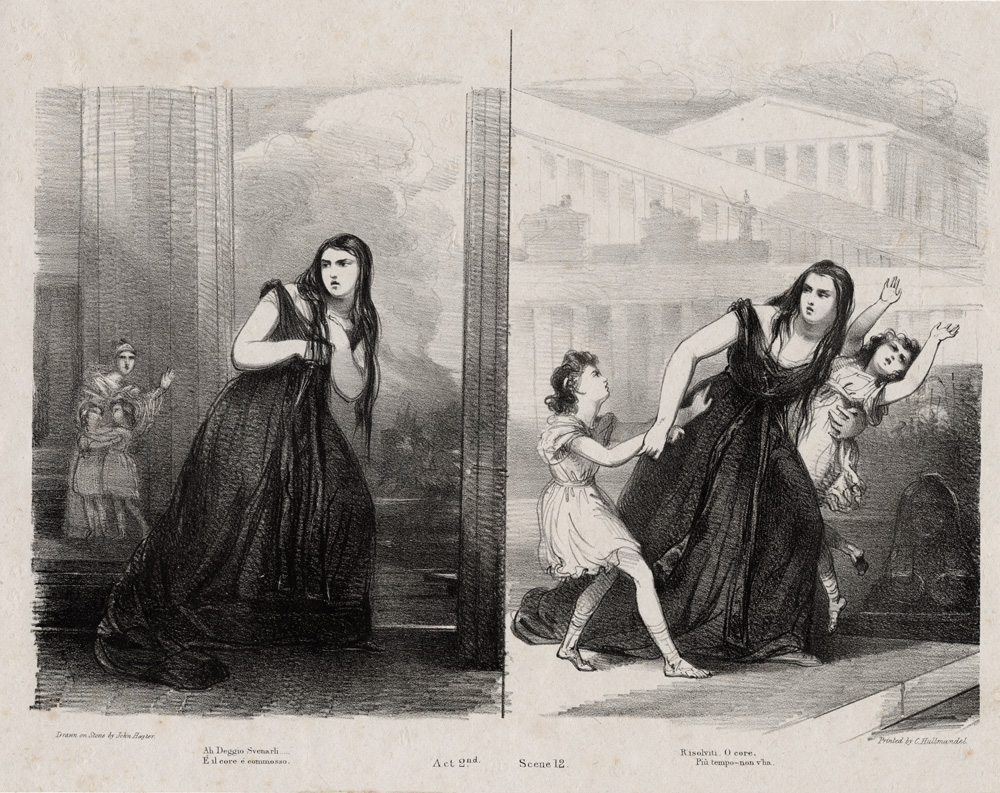
- Giuditta Pasta in the title role
- Librettist: Felice Romani
- Language: Italian
- Based on: Greek myth of Medea
- Premiere: 28 November 1813; Teatro San Carlo, Naples

Medea in Corinto (Medea in Corinth) is an 1813 opera in Italian by the composer Simon Mayr. It takes the form of a melodramma tragico in two acts. The libretto, by Felice Romani, is based on the Greek myth of Medea and the plays on the theme by Euripides and Pierre Corneille. The same subject had formed the basis for Luigi Cherubini's famous opera Médée (1797) which may have had an influence on Mayr's work. Medea in Corinto was first performed at the Teatro San Carlo in Naples on 28 November 1813 and was Mayr's greatest theatrical success.

== Roles ==
Roles, voice type, premiere cast
| Role | Voice type | Premiere cast, 28 November 1813 Conductor: Nicola Festa |
|---|---|---|
| Medea | soprano | Isabella Colbran |
| Giasone | tenor | Andrea Nozzari |
| Creonte | bass | Michele Benedetti |
| Creusa | soprano | Teresa Luigia Pontiggia |
| Ismene | soprano | Joaquína García |
| Egeo | tenor | Manuel García |
| Evandro | tenor | Raffaele Ferrari |
| Tideo | tenor | Gaetano Chizzola |
| Medea's son | mime | Maria Malibran (?) |

== Synopsis ==
=== Act 1 ===
Jason (Giasone) has rejected his former wife, Medea, in favour of Creusa, daughter of King Creon (Creonte) of Corinth. Creon banishes Medea from the city and she swears revenge. Meanwhile, King Aegeus (Egeo) of Athens arrives in Corinth. He had been promised Creusa as his bride. Finding he has been rejected, he makes a pact with Medea. As Jason and Creusa are being married in the temple, Medea bursts in with Aegeus's soldiers and a fight breaks out as they attempt to carry off the bride and bridegroom.

=== Act 2 ===
Creon's men have defeated and captured Medea and Aegeus. In prison, Medea uses her magic powers to summon up demons from the underworld. She kills Creusa with a poisoned robe then stabs her own – and Jason's – children to death, before making her escape in a chariot pulled by flying dragons. In despair, Jason attempts suicide in vain.

== Recordings ==
- Marisa Galvany, Joan Patenaude, Molly Stark, Allen Cathcart, Robert White, Thomas Palmer, Clarion Concerts, conducted by Newell Jenkins (Vanguard, 1969)
- Leyla Gencer, William Johns, Gianfranco Casarini, Gianfranco Pastine, Cecilia Fusco, Luigi Paolillo, Ivana Cavallini, Ermanno Lorenzi, Teatro San Carlo Orchestra and Chorus, conducted by Maurizio Arena (Myto Records, 1977)
- Jane Eaglen, Yvonne Kenny, Bruce Ford, Raúl Giménez, Alistair Miles, Philharmonia Orchestra, conducted by David Parry (Opera Rara, 1997)
- Elżbieta Szmytka, Evelyn Pollock, Mark Milhofer, Lawrence Brownlee, Wojtek Gierlach, Sinfonieorchester & Chorus Theater St. Gallen, conducted by David Stern (oehms classics, 2010)
- Nadja Michael, Ramón Vargas, Alastair Miles, Alek Shrader, Elena Tsallagova, Bavarian State Opera, conducted by Ivor Bolton, stage directed by Hans Neuenfels (Arthaus DVD, 2010)

== Sources ==
- The Viking Opera Guide ed. Amanda Holden (Viking, 1993)
- Del Teatro (in Italian)
- Casaglia, Gherardo (2005). "Medea in Corinto, 28 November 1813". L'Almanacco di Gherardo Casaglia (in Italian).
