= Arianna in Nasso (Mayr) =

1815 opera by Simon Mayr

Arianna in Nasso (Ariadne on Naxos) is an 1815 "azione drammatica", or scenic cantata, in one act by Simon Mayr to a libretto by Giovanni Schmidt. It premiered at the Teatro San Carlo, Naples, on 19 February 1815 with the role of Ariadne sung by Isabella Colbran, who had requested Mayr to compose the piece for her to showcase her skills.

== Recordings ==
- 2012: Cornelia Horak (soprano, Arianna), Thomas Michael Allen (tenor, Bacco), Simon Mayr Chorus and Ensemble, directed from the harpsichord by Franz Hauk, Naxos 1 CD
