= Ramón Vargas =

Mexican operatic tenor (born 1960)

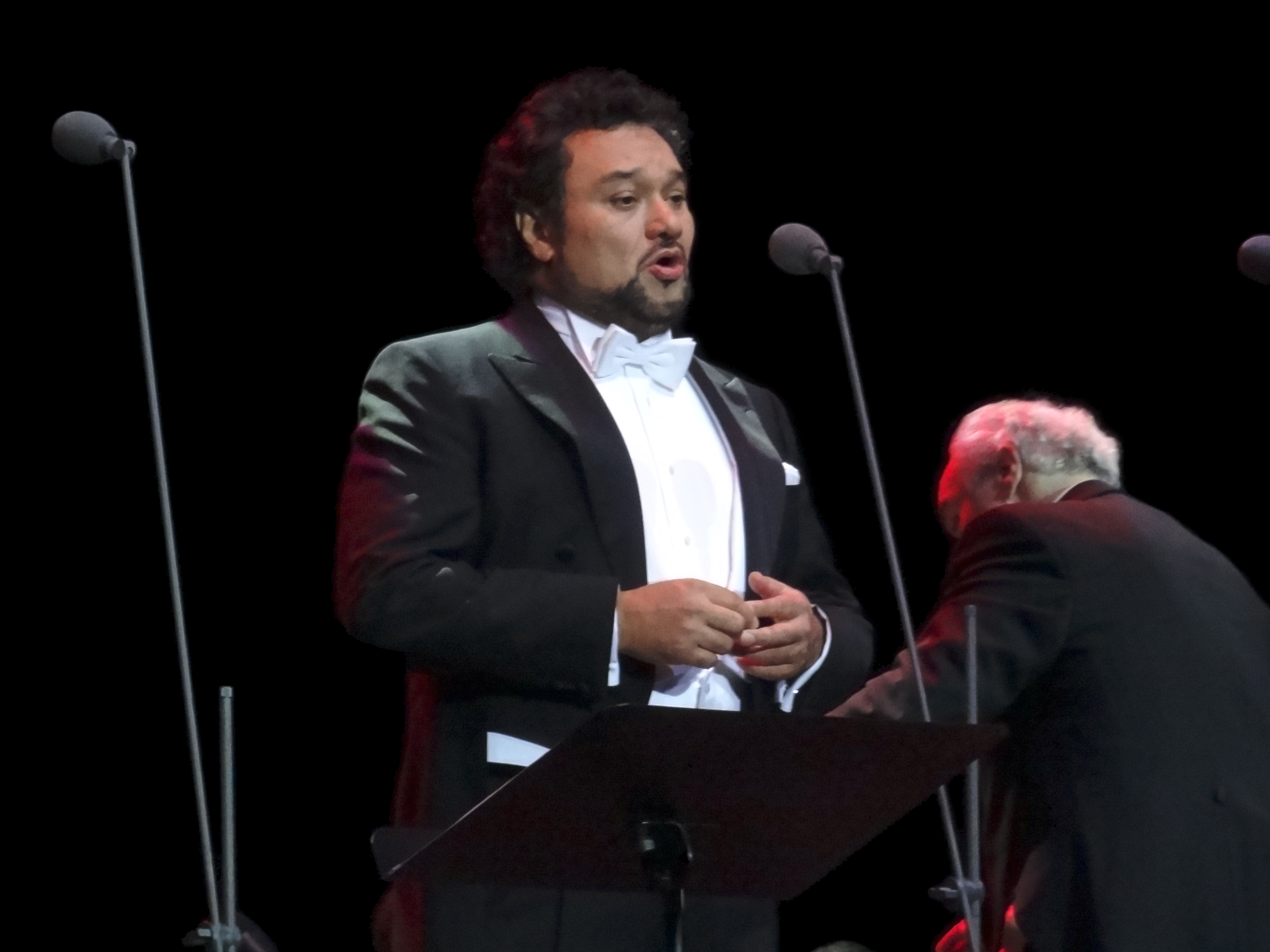
- Dmitry Khvorostovsky's anniversary concert, St. Petersburg, 2013
- Born: 1960 (age 65–66); México City
- Education: Cardenal Miranda Institute, México City
- Occupation: Operatic tenor
- Website: www.ramonvargas.com

Ramón Vargas (born 11 September 1960) is a Mexican operatic tenor. Since his debut in the early '90s, he has developed to become one of the most acclaimed tenors of the 21st century. Known for his most expressive and agile lyric tenor voice, he is especially successful in the bel canto repertoire.

== Biography ==
Born in Mexico City, the seventh of nine children. Ramón Vargas began singing at the age of 9, joining the boys' choir of the Basilica of Guadalupe in his home town. He then studied at the Cardenal Miranda Institute in México City, with Antonio Lopez and Ricardo Sanchez.

In 1982, after winning the Carlo Morelli National Vocal Competition, he made his debut in Haydn's Lo speziale, in Monterrey, Mexico. His breakthrough came in 1983, when the Mexican conductor Eduardo Mata hired him to sing Fenton in Verdi's Falstaff, and then Don Ottavio in Mozart's Don Giovanni. Upon winning the Enrico Caruso Tenor Competition in Milan, Italy, in 1986, he moved to Austria where he completed his vocal studies at the school of the Vienna State Opera, under the guidance of Leo Müller.

After deciding to become a freelancer in 1990, he met the renowned teacher, Rodolfo Celletti, in Milan, who became his vocal coach.

Ramón Vargas' international debut took place in 1992, when the New York Metropolitan Opera asked him to sing Edgardo opposite June Anderson, substituting Luciano Pavarotti. This was soon followed by a debut on the stage of La Scala, in 1993, where he sang Fenton in Strehler's new production celebrating the centenary of Falstaff, conducted by Riccardo Muti. He now regularly performs at all the major opera houses all over the world to great acclaim:

Buenos Aires Teatro Colón (La favorita), London Royal Opera House (Un ballo in maschera, La bohème, Rigoletto, La traviata), Milan La Scala (Falstaff, Rigoletto, La traviata), New York Metropolitan Opera (Attila, La bohème, Il barbiere di Siviglia, La Cenerentola, L'elisir d'amore, Lucia di Lammermoor, Rigoletto, Der Rosenkavalier), Madrid Teatro Real (Werther), Paris Opéra-Bastille (Rigoletto, La traviata), San Francisco Opera (Un ballo in maschera, L'elisir d'amore, Lucia di Lammermoor), Vienna State Opera (La bohème, L'elisir d'amore, La favorita, Lucia di Lammermoor, Manon, Maria Stuarda, Rigoletto, Roberto Devereux, Werther), Verona Arena (Il barbiere di Siviglia, Rigoletto), and others.

In addition to his operatic career, he is also an accomplished concert singer, with an extensive repertoire ranging from Italian classical songs to romantic German Lieder and melodies by French, Mexican and Spanish composers from the 19th and 20th centuries. In 1998, he offered a memorable recital at La Scala and his renditions of popular Mexican songs have been met with enthusiasm at massive concerts across Europe and Mexico.

He was awarded the Lauri-Volpi Award for the Best Opera Singer of the 1993 Italian season, and in 1995 Italian critics were unanimous in awarding him the Gino Tani Award for the Arts. In 2000, British Opera Now declared Ramón Vargas Artist of the Year. Every year since 1999, Austrian Festspiele Magazine has awarded him first place among the best tenors in the world. In 2001, he received the ECHO Klassik - Singer of the Year Award from the German Phono Academy.

He lives with his wife Amalia, and his two sons Fernando and Rodrigo in Vienna, Austria.

== Charity work ==
In 1993, Eduardo, the first son of Ramón Vargas and his wife, was born in a hospital in Italy. Unfortunately, due to the negligence of the doctors attending the childbirth, the baby suffered a hypoxic encephalopathy, causing a nonreversible injury to his brain. During the following few months doctors in Europe and the United States confirmed a hopeless prognosis of brain paralysis, in the degree of quadriplegia. In the beginning of January 2000, Eduardo's life reached its end.

Nonetheless, his parents decided that they did not wish to isolate themselves from their experience, on the contrary, they chose to perpetuate the memory and the example of Eduardo to help other special children like him, by setting up the Eduardo Vargas Memorial Fund.

The creation and basic aims of the memorial fund were publicly announced by means of a gala concert with Ramón Vargas and the young American soprano Noëlle Richardson, accompanied on the piano by Mzia Bachtouridze, at the villa of the Rothschild Foundation in Saint-Jean-Cap-Ferrat, on 1 July 2000.

The initial proceeds were channeled through Vamos, a foundation with large experience in social development activities amongst the most vulnerable population in Mexico, towards some programmes of support that cover the following aspects:

- Training promoters and community therapists
- Providing information and support to the parents of children with special needs
- Giving direct attention to disabled children and young people.

In addition to contributions made by friends and generous anonymous donors, the Eduardo Vargas Memorial Fund is supported by the proceeds from concerts performed by Ramón Vargas.

== Repertoire ==
Vincenzo Bellini

- Beatrice di Tenda (Orombello)
- I Capuleti e i Montecchi (Tebaldo)
- La sonnambula (Elvino)
- Zaira (Corasmino)

Hector Berlioz

- La damnation de Faust (Faust)

Luigi Cherubini

- Médée (Jason)

Domenico Cimarosa

- Il matrimonio segreto (Paolino)

Gaetano Donizetti

- L'elisir d'amore (Nemorino)
- Lucia di Lammermoor (Edgardo)
- La favorita (Fernando)
- Maria Stuarda (Leicester)
- Roberto Devereux (Roberto Devereux)

Charles Gounod

- Faust (Faust)

Joseph Haydn

- Lo speziale (Sempronio)

Jules Massenet

- Manon (Le Chevalier des Grieux)
- Werther (Werther)

Simon Mayr

- Medea in Corinto (Giasone)

Claudio Monteverdi

- L'incoronazione di Poppea (Nerone)

Wolfgang Amadeus Mozart

- La clemenza di Tito (Tito)
- Don Giovanni (Don Ottavio)
- Idomeneo (Idiamante, Idomeneo)
- Die Zauberflöte (Tamino)

Jacques Offenbach

- Les contes d'Hoffmann (Hoffmann)

Giacomo Puccini

- La bohème (Rodolfo)

Gioachino Rossini

- Adina (Ali/Selimo)
- Il barbiere di Siviglia (Il Conte d'Almaviva)
- La Cambiale del Matrimonio (Milfort)
- Elisabetta Regina d´Inghilterra (Leicester)
- La Cenerentola (Don Ramiro)
- La donna del lago (Rodrigo)
- Maometto II (Paolo Eriso)
- Mosè in Egitto (Amènofi)
- L'occasione fa il ladro (Alberto)
- La Scala di seta (Dorvil)
- Tancredi (Agirio)
- Il turco in Italia (Don Narciso)
- Il viaggio a Reims (Belfiore)

Antonio Salieri

- Axur, re d'Ormus (Atar)

Richard Strauss

- Der Rosenkavalier (The Italian Singer)

Igor Stravinsky

- The Rake's Progress (Tom Rakewell)

Pyotr Ilyich Tchaikovsky

- Eugene Onegin (Lensky)

Giuseppe Verdi

- Alzira (Zamoro)
- Attila (Foresto)
- Don Carlos (Don Carlos)
- I due Foscari (Jacopo)
- Falstaff (Fenton)
- I Lombardi (Oronte)
- Messa da Requiem (Tenor)
- La traviata (Alfredo)
- Luisa Miller (Rodolfo)
- Rigoletto (Il Duca di Mantova)
- Simon Boccanegra (Gabriele Adorno)
- Un ballo in maschera (Riccardo)

== Discography ==
Opera

- Manon Lescaut, Puccini. Decca, 1993 (Edmondo)
- Zaira, Bellini. Nuova Era, 1993
- Falstaff, Verdi. Sony, 1994
- Il barbiere di Siviglia, Naxos, 1994
- Otello, Verdi. Deutsche Grammophon, 1994 (Cassio)
- Goyescas, Granados. Auvidis, 1996
- La Scala di Seta, Rossini. Claves, 1996
- Tancredi, Rossini. RCA, 1996
- I Capuleti e i Montecchi, Bellini. RCA Red Seal, 1998
- Il Turco in Italia, Rossini. Decca, 1998
- Maometto II, Rossini. BMG Ricordi, 1999
- Werther, Massenet. RCA, 1999
- La favorite, Donizetti. RCA, 2000
- Alzira, Verdi. Philips, 2001

Oratario and Sacred Music

- Christmas with Ramón Vargas. Claves Records, 1996
- Messa da Requiem. Verdi, 2007

Recital

- Navidad desde México. Sony Music, 1996 (Popular Mexican songs)
- Suite Española De Águstin Lara. PolyGram, 1996 (Popular Mexican songs)
- Corazón Mexicano. Gobierno de la Ciudad de México, 1998 (Popular Mexican songs)
- L'amour, l'amour. RCA, 1999
- Rossini & Donizetti Opera Arias. Claves Records, 2000
- Canzoni. Delta, 2000 (Italian Art songs)
- México Lindo. BMG Classics, 2000 (Popular Mexican songs)
- Verdi Arias. RCA, 2001
- Nel Mio Cuore. RCA, 2003 (Arie Antiche)
- Between Friends. RCA, 2004
- The Opera Gala Live from Baden-Baden. Deutsche Grammophon, 2008
- (Novecento Segreto, Novecento Popolare)

Various

- Lesley Garrett - I Will Wait For You. RCA, 2000
- Possession. RCA, 2002 (Soundtrack)
- RCA Red Seal Century: The Vocalists. RCA, 2002
- Catch a Shining Star. Narm Recordings, 2003
- Inspirations. Trauma, 2004
- Puccini Festival-die Grossen Opern Highlights. Decca, 2008

DVD

- Opera Stars Sing Broadway. St Clair Vision, 2004
- Don Carlo, Verdi. TDK, 2007
- Eugene Onegin Tchaikovsky. Decca, 2007
- Idomeneo, Mozart. Decca, 2007
- Messa da Requiem, Verdi. TDK, 2007
- La Bohème, Puccini. EMI Classics, 2008
- La Traviata, Verdi. Arthaus Musik, 2008 (Also on Blu-ray)
- The Opera Gala: Live from Baden-Baden. Deutsche Grammophon, 2008 (Also on Blu-ray)
- Don Giovanni, Mozart. Opus Arte, 2009 (Also on Blu-ray)
- Medea In Corinto, Mayr. Arthaus Musik, 2011 (Also on Blu-ray)
