= La Lodoiska =

Opera by Simon Mayr

La Lodoiska is an opera in three acts by Simon Mayr to an Italian libretto by Francesco Gonella De Ferrari. It was Mayr's second opera and premiered at La Fenice in Venice on 26 January 1796.

== Background and performance history ==
The libretto for La Lodoiska was based on an episode from Jean-Baptiste Louvet de Couvrai's novel, Les Amours du chevalier de Faublas, which had also formed the basis for Cherubini's 1791 opera Lodoïska. The opera had a very successful premiere at La Fenice on 26 January 1796 and had 13 more performances that season. Its music and story were also used for a ballet of the same name choreographed by Lorenzo Panzieri, which premiered at La Fenice in January 1797, and the opera itself was revived at La Fenice in November of that year. On 4 November 1798 it had its first performance at the Teatro Real de São Carlos in Lisbon in celebration of the name day of Carlota Joaquina of Spain.

Mayr then revised the opera to a two-act version which nevertheless had more musical numbers than the original three-act version. The new version premiered at La Scala on 26 December 1799. It was Mayr's first opera to be performed there and its success led to more commissions from La Scala and other Milanese theatres. La Lodoiska in its revised version was then performed in Turin at the Teatro Regio in 1804 and in Naples at the Teatro San Carlo in 1818 when the title role was sung by Isabella Colbran. The opera was very popular in its day but then fell into obscurity.

== Roles ==
Roles, voice types, premiere cast
Role	Voice type	Premiere cast 26 January 1796
Lodoiska, a Polish princess in love with Lovinski	soprano	Teresa Maciorletti Blasi
Lovinski, a Polish lord using the name "Siveno"	soprano castrato	Luigi Marchesi
Boleslao, lord of the Castle of Ostropoll	tenor	Giuseppe Carri
Resiska, confidante of Lodoiska	soprano	Teodosia Ferraglia
Narseno, Lovinski's companion	mezzo-soprano castrato (1st version) bass (2nd version)	Pietro Bonini
Radoski, confidante of Boleslao	tenor	Filippo Martinelli
Giskano, a Tartar warrior-prince	bass	Antonio Ricci
Sigeski, Lodoiska's father	bass	Giacomo Zamboni

== Synopsis ==
Setting: 17th century Poland in a castle on the border with Tartary

Princess Lodoiska has been entrusted by her father to the care of Boleslao, lord of the Castle of Ostropoll. Boleslao wants to marry Lodoïska, but she is in love with Lovinski and rejects his advances. Lovinski arrives (under the name "Siveno") to ask for Princess Lodoïska on behalf of her father, but Boleslao refuses to let her go. When Lodoïska's father, Sigeski, arrives and confronts him, the tyrannical Boleslao imprisons both Sigeski and Lovinski and plans the death of the young lovers. All are saved at the end when they are rescued by Giskano, a Tartar warrior-prince, whose life Lovinski had once saved.
