= Si Sara, Gilan =

Si Sara سي سرا
- Village
- Location within Iran
- Coordinates: 37°00′01″N 50°21′07″E
- Country: Iran
- Province: Gilan
- County: Rudsar
- Bakhsh: Rahimabad
- Rural District: Rahimabad

Population (2006)
  - Total: 117
- Time zone: UTC+3:30 (IRST)
  - Summer (DST): UTC+4:30 (IRDT)

Si Sara (Persian: سي سرا, also Romanized as Sī Sarā) is a village in Rahimabad Rural District, Rahimabad District, Rudsar County, Gilan Province, Iran. At the 2006 census, its population was 117, in 30 families.
