= Amor ingegnoso (Mayr) =

Opera by Simon Mayr

Amor ingegnoso is a 1798 farsa by Simon Mayr to a libretto by Caterino Mazzolà, the librettist of Mozart's La Clemenza di Tito. The plot concerns a girl, thought to have died, who pretends to be a ghost to misdirect her former fiancé, in order to marry the man she really loves.

== Recordings ==
- Amor ingegnoso - Filippo Morace (Osmarino), Gabriella Locatelli Serio (Fiammetta), Elena Rossi (Irene), Sonia Lubrini (Lisetta), Gabriele Sagona (Il Barone), Livio Scarpellini (Orosmondo), Annamaria Pennisi (Adelaide), Luigi Barilone (Maghinardo) Orchestra of the Bergamo Music Festival, PierAngelo Pelucchi. recorded live 2010 Bongiovanni, libretto in Italian and English, GB2456 1CD
