= Louis-Charles Caigniez =

French playwright (1762–1842)

Louis-Charles Caignier
- Born: 13 April 1762; Arras
- Died: 19 February 1842 (aged 79)
- Occupation: Playwright

Louis-Charles Caigniez (13 April 1762 – 19 February 1842) was a 19th-century French playwright.

== Biography ==
Endowed with a talent for the stage, Caigniez competed on the boulevard theaters with René Charles Guilbert de Pixérécourt and was nicknamed "the Racine of melodrama", of which Pixérécourt was called the Corneille.

Caigniez literary taste was enough to succeed in more delicate works. His three-act comedy Volage presented in 1807 at the Théâtre Louvois and his Méprise en diligence, another three-act comedy given at the Théâtre Favart in 1819, are notable by their original and comic situations.

The main success of this author in the melodrama genre are: le Jugement de Salomon (1802) and la Pie voleuse, ou la Servante de Palaiseau (1815). These two plays were presented with the same long success, both in Paris and in the cities of the province and abroad; Rossini composed his opera La gazza ladra after the second.

== Works ==
- 1804: Androclès, ou le Lion reconnaissant, inspired the libretto for L'esule di Roma by Gaetano Donizetti (1828)
- 1804: les Amants en poste
- 1805: La Forêt d’Hermanstadt
- 1807: Le Faux Alexis, ou Mariage par Vengeance
- 1809: Les Enfants du bûcheron
- 1810: La Fille adoptive, ou les deux mères rivales
- 1812: Le Juif-Errant
- 1813: La Morte vivante
- Edgar ou La chasse aux loups used by Simon Mayr for his opera Le due duchesse, ossia La caccia dei lupi (1814)
- 1815: La Pie voleuse ou la Servante de Palaiseau, melodrama in 3 acts with Théodore Baudouin d'Aubigny, Théâtre de la Porte-Saint-Martin, (29 April)
- 1815: Jean de Calais which served as a base for the opera Gianni di Calais by Donizetti (1828)
- 1817: Les Corbeaux accusateurs
- 1821: Ugolin, ou la Tour de la Faim
- 1822: La Belle au bois dormant

== Sources ==
- Gustave Vapereau, Dictionnaire universel des littératures, Paris, Hachette, 1876, p. 844
