= David Butt Philip =

British operatic tenor (born 1980)

David Butt Philip (born 12 March 1980) is a British operatic tenor.

== Early life and education ==
He was born and brought up in Wells, Somerset, and as a treble was a chorister at Peterborough Cathedral under Christopher Gower (Peterborough at that time had a boarding house for choristers, attached to The King's School, Peterborough, a state comprehensive school). After Peterborough, he attended Charlottesville High School, Virginia USA for six months before returning to complete his secondary education at the Wells Blue School. After studying politics and philosophy, and then music at the University of Liverpool, Butt Philip studied at the Royal Northern College of Music in Manchester and sang as a vicar choral in Manchester Cathedral choir and with the BBC Singers. He studied as a baritone on the postgraduate opera course at the Royal Academy of Music and was a member of the Glyndebourne chorus, where he was encouraged by the conductor Vladimir Jurowski among others to change to singing tenor. He won Glyndebourne's John Christie Award in 2011 and went on to study as a tenor at the National Opera Studio, London.

== Career ==
From 2012–2014 he was a member of the Jette Parker Young Artists Programme at the Royal Opera House, Covent Garden, London. With The Royal Opera, Butt Philip has sung First Chevalier/Master of Ceremonies in Robert le diable, Abdallo in Nabucco, First Man in Armour in Die Zauberflöte, Master of Ceremonies in Gloriana. He sang the role of Pang in Puccini's Turandot in 2014, Servant in Capriccio, Apparition of a Youth in Die Frau ohne Schatten and Commissary in Dialogues des Carmelites. He sang Rodolfo in La Bohème with English National Opera at the London Coliseum in Autumn 2014 and with English Touring Opera in Spring 2015. He sang Grigori in Boris Godunov at the Royal Opera House in March 2016 ("strikingly well sung" according to the Guardian), and Pinkerton in Madama Butterfly with ENO in Summer 2016.

Butt Philip is represented by the agency Ingpen and Williams.
