= Tobiae matrimonium =

1794 composition

Tobiae matrimonium, actio sacra pro filiabus chori S. Lazari is a 1794 oratorio by Simon Mayr to a Latin libretto by Giuseppe Maria Foppa. It was the third of Mayr's works written for the Ospedale dei Mendicanti. No exact date or circumstances for the original performance are known.

== Recordings ==
- Raguel - Judith Spiesser (soprano), Anna – Margriet Buchberger (soprano), Sara – Cornelia (soprano), Tobias – Stefanie Iranyi (mezzo), archangel Raphael – Susanne Bernhard (soprano). Simon Mayr Chorus and Ensemble, director and harpsichord Franz Hauk. recorded 14–18 July 2007, Assam church of Maria de Victoria, Ingolstadt, Germany. 2CD Naxos
