= Giuseppe Maria Foppa =

Italian librettist (1760-1845)

Giuseppe Maria Foppa (Venice, 12 July 1760 – Venice, 1 March 1845) was an Italian librettist. He wrote around 150 libretti, mainly for comic operas, as well as Latin oratorio texts and his memoirs. He composed work for theatres in Milan, Genoa, Pistoia, Padua, Reggio Emilia, Bologna, and Florence.

== Librettos ==
- Romeo and Juliet, for Nicola Antonio Zingarelli
- L'inganno felice, La scala di seta, Il signor Bruschino and Sigismondo (1814) for Gioachino Rossini
- Gli artigiani, 1795 for Pasquale Anfossi
- L'intrigo della lettera 1797, and several oratorios for Simone Mayr
- Lo spazzacamino principe 1794, and Le donne cambiate 1797 for Marcos António Portugal
- Teresa e Claudio, 1801 for Giuseppe Farinelli
- Le metamorfosi di Pasquale, 1802 for Gaspare Spontini
- Un buco nella porta, 1804 for Francesco Gardi
