= Simon Mayr =

German composer (1763–1845)

Johann Simon Mayr
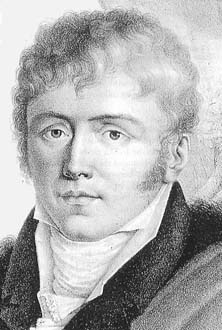
- Born: June 14, 1763; Mendorf, Bavaria, Germany
- Died: December 2, 1845 (aged 82); Bergamo, Italy
- Occupation: Composer

Johann(es) Simon Mayr (also spelled Majer, Mayer, Maier), also known in Italian as Giovanni Simone Mayr or Simone Mayr (14 June 1763 – 2 December 1845), was a German composer. His music reflects the transition from the Classical to the Romantic musical era. In 1805 he founded the Bergamo Conservatory. He was an early inspiration to Rossini and Meyerbeer and taught and advocated for Donizetti.

== Life ==
He was born in Mendorf near Altmannstein, Landkreis Eichstätt, Bavaria, and studied theology at the University of Ingolstadt, continuing his studies in Italy from 1787. He was closely associated with the Illuminati of Adam Weishaupt while a student in Ingolstadt, and the ideals of the French Enlightenment were a strong influence on his philosophy as a musician as corroborated by his famed Zibaldone or "Notebooks" compiled toward the end of his career.

Shortly thereafter, he took music lessons with Carlo Lenzi, and later with Ferdinando Bertoni. He moved to Bergamo in 1802 and was appointed maestro di cappella at the Cathedral of Bergamo, succeeding his old teacher Lenzi. He held the post until his death, and became a central figure in the city's musical life, organizing concerts and introducing Ludwig van Beethoven's music there. In 1805 he founded the Bergamo Conservatory; then known as the Lezioni Caritatevoli di Musica. One of his pupils at the conservatory was Gaetano Donizetti. By the end of his life, he was blind. He died in Bergamo and is buried in the Basilica di Santa Maria Maggiore there, just in front of the tomb of his famous pupil.

Mayr's works, among which there are almost seventy operas, are rarely performed today.

== Works ==
See List of compositions by Simon Mayr and List of operas by Simon Mayr

== Recordings ==
- Ginevra di Scozia - Elizabeth Vidal (soprano); Daniela Barcellona (mezzo-soprano); Antonino Siragusa (tenor); Luca Grassi (baritone); Giuseppina Piunti (soprano); Marco Lazzara (countertenor); Orchestra del Teatro Verdi di Trieste; Tiziano Severini (conductor). Label: Opera Rara ORC23
- Fedra (Chiaudani, Nelsen, Zagorski, Lee; Schaller) OEHMS Classics 920
- Verter (Herrmann, Gemmabella, Cicchetti, Salsi, Zarelli; Terracini). Bongiovanni GB 2343–4.
- Medea in Corinto (Eaglen, Kenny, Ford, Miles; Parry), Opera Rara ORC11 [1993]
- Konzert mit Schnitte von Werken von Johann Simon Mayr. Wilhelm Schmailzl, Karlskron [1996]
- Samuele Fono-Schallplattengesellschaft, Laer [1997]
- Grande messa da requiem Orchestra Stabile di Bergamo, Agora [1997]
- Stabat Mater No.3 in C-minor Incontri Europei con la Musica, Bongiovanni [1999]
- Che Originali! ossia La Musicomania Georgisches Kammerorchester, Guild [1999]
- Mass in C-minor Guild [2001]
- La Passione Kammerorchester Ingolstadt, Guild [2002]
- Atalia Neue Düsseldorfer Hofmusik Guild [2003]
- Vespri per il Corpus Domini 1802 Orchestra da Camera Milano Classica, Bongiovanni [2004]
- Sisara Accademia I Filarmonici di Verona, Simon Mayr Chor conducted by Franz Hauk Guild GmbH 2004
- L'Armonia and Cantata for the Death of Beethoven. Ingolstadt Georgian Chamber Orchestra and Simon Mayr Choir, Naxos [2006]
- La Rosa Bianca e la Rosa Rossa (Antonacci, Anselmi, Serraicocca, Canonici, Facini; Briccetti) Fonit Cetra RFCD 2007
- David in Spelunca Engaddi, Naxos [2008]
- L'amor coniugale, Naxos, [2008]
- Tobiae matrimonium Simon Mayr Chor + Ensemble, Naxos [2009]
- Medea in Corinto Theater St. Gallen, Oehmsclassic [2010]
- La Lodoiska Münchner Rundfunkorchester, Oehmsclassic [2011]
- Amor ingegnoso, Bongiovanni GB 2456-2 [2012]
- Samuele, Naxos [2012]
- Demetrio, Re di Siria, Oehmsclassic [2012]
- Innalzamento al trono del giovane re Gioas. Cantata, Naxos [2012]
- Il sagrifizio di Jefte, Oratorio, Naxos [2013]
- Piano Concerto in C-major
- Ginevra di Scozia, Oehmsclassic [2014]
- Gran messa di requiem in G-minor, Naxos [2015]
- Le Due Duchesse, Naxos [2020]
- Messa di Gloria in E-minor, Naxos [2021]
- Messa di Gloria in F-minor, Naxos [2021]
- L'accademia di musica, Naxos [2022]
- Giovanni, Naxos [2026]

== Film ==
- Martin Pfeil: Der vergessene Musiker: Johann Simon Mayer (1763–1845). INTV Media Ingolstadt, 1995 (VHS, 30 Min.)
