= List of operas by Gaspare Spontini =

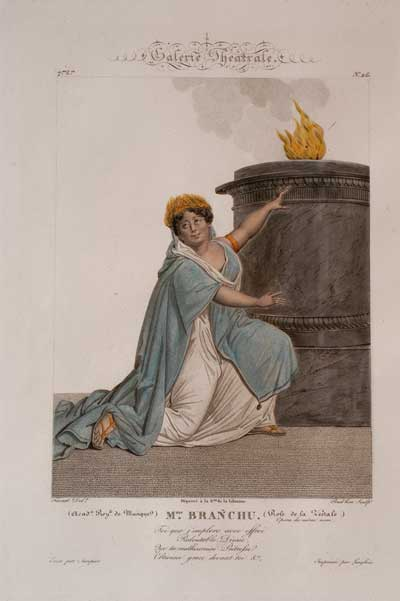
French opera singer Caroline Branchu as Julia in La vestale (1807)

Gaspare Spontini (1774–1851) wrote operas from the last decade of the 18th century to the third decade of the 19th century.

Before leaving Italy, where he was born, he wrote:

- Li puntigli delle donne
- Adelina Senese o sia l'Amore secreto
- Il finto pittore
- L'eroismo ridicolo
- Il Teseo riconosciuto
- La finta filosofa
- La fuga in maschera
- I quadri parlanti
- Gli Elisi delusi
- Gli amanti in cimento, o sia Il geloso audace
- Le metamorfosi di Pasquale, o sia Tutto è illusione nel mondo

For Paris, he wrote:

- La petite maison
- Milton
- Julie, ou Le pot de fleurs
- La vestale
- Fernand Cortez, ou La conquête du Mexique
- Pélage, ou Le roi et la paix
- Les dieux rivaux, ou Les fêtes de Cythère
- Olimpie

First presented in Berlin:

- Nurmahal, oder das Rosenfest von Caschmir
- Alcidor
- Agnes von Hohenstaufen

Operas by Gaspare Spontini
Title	Genre	Subdivisions	Libretto	Première date	Place, theatre
Li puntigli delle donne	farsetta per musica	2 acts	unknown	Carnival 1796	Florence, Regio Teatro degli Intrepidi
Adelina Senese o sia l'Amore secreto	dramma giocoso	2 acts	Giovanni Bertati, after his libretto La principessa d'Amalfi for Joseph Weigl	10 October 1797	Venice, Teatro San Samuele
Il finto pittore	farsetta/melodramma buffo?	unknown	unknown	1797/1798; 1800	Rome (?); Palermo, Teatro Santa Cecilia
L'eroismo ridicolo	farsa per musica	1 act	Domenico Piccinni	Carnival 1798	Naples, Teatro Nuovo sopra Toledo
Il Teseo riconosciuto	dramma per musica	2 acts	Cosimo Giotti	22 May 1798	Florence, Regio Teatro degli Intrepidi
La finta filosofa	commedia per musica	2 acts	Domenico Piccinni	1 July 1799	Naples, Teatro Nuovo sopra Toledo
La fuga in maschera	commedia per musica	2 acts	Giuseppe Palomba	Carnival 1800	Naples, Teatro Nuovo sopra Toledo
I quadri parlanti (Note: Manuscript score rediscovered in 2016)	melodramma buffo	unknown	unknown	1800	Palermo, Teatro Santa Cecilia
Gli Elisi delusi	melodramma buffo	2 acts	Michelangelo Monti	28 August 1800	Palermo, Teatro Santa Cecilia
Gli amanti in cimento, o sia Il geloso audace	dramma giocoso	2 acts	Giovanni Bertati	3 November 1801	Rome, Teatro Valle
Le metamorfosi di Pasquale, o sia Tutto è illusione nel mondo	farsa giocosa per musica	1 act	Giuseppe Foppa	Carnival 1802	Venice, Teatro Giustiniani in San Moisè
La petite maison	opéra comique	3 acts	Joseph Marie Armand Michel Dieulafoy and Nicolas Gersin	12 May 1804	Paris, Opéra-Comique, Salle Feydeau
Milton	fait historique	1 act	Victor-Joseph Étienne de Jouy and Joseph Marie Armand Michel Dieulafoy	27 November 1804	Paris, Opéra Comique, Salle Favart
Julie, ou Le pot de fleurs	comédie en prose, mêlée de chants	1 act	Antoine Gabriel Jars	12 March 1805	Paris, Opéra Comique, Salle Favart
La vestale	tragédie lyrique	3 acts	Victor-Joseph Étienne de Jouy, after Johann Joachim Winckelmann's Monumenti antichi inediti (1767)	15 December 1807	Paris, Opéra
Fernand Cortez, ou La conquête du Mexique; third and fourth versions, in German, as Fernand Cortez oder Die Eroberung von Mexiko	tragédie lyrique	3 acts	Victor-Joseph Etienne de Jouy and Joseph-Alphonse d'Esménard, after Alexis Piron; second version: revised by Victor-Joseph Etienne de Jouy; third version: revised by Emmanuel Théaulon, translated by J. C. May; fourth version: revised by Karl August von Lichtenstein	28 November 1809; second version: 28 May 1817; third version: 6 April 1824; fourth version: 26 February 1832	Paris, Opéra (first and second versions); Berlin, Königliches Opernhaus (third and fourth versions)
Pélage, ou Le roi et la paix	opéra	2 acts	Victor-Joseph Etienne de Jouy	23 August 1814	Paris, Opéra
Les dieux rivaux, ou Les fêtes de Cythère (Together with Rudolphe Kreutzer, Louis-Luc Loiseau de Persuis and Henri Montan Berton)	opéra-ballet	1 act	Joseph Marie Armand Michel Dieulafoy and Charles Brifaut	21 June 1816	Paris, Opéra
Olimpie; second version, in German, as Olimpia; third version, again in French, as Olimpie	tragédie lyrique	3 acts	Joseph Marie Armand Michel Dieulafoy and Charles Brifaut, after Voltaire; second version translated and revised by E. T. A. Hoffmann	22 December 1819; second version: 14 May 1821; third version: 28 February 1826	Paris, Opéra (first and third versions); Berlin, Königliches Opernhaus (second version)
Nurmahal, oder das Rosenfest von Caschmir	lyrisches Drama mit Ballet	2 acts	Carl Alexander Herklots, after Thomas Moore's Lalla Rookh	27 May 1822	Berlin, Königliches Opernhaus
Alcidor	Zauberoper mit Ballet	3 acts	Marie-Emmanuel-Guillaume Théaulon de Lambert and C. Nutty, after Rochon de Chabannes; German translation by Carl Alexander Herklots	23 May 1825 (to celebrate the marriage of Prince Frederick of the Netherlands and Princess Louise of Prussia on 21 May 1825)	Berlin, Königliches Opernhaus
Agnes von Hohenstaufen	lyrisches Drama	3 acts (Note: originally planned for 2 acts)	Ernst Raupach (first and second versions); revised by Karl August von Lichtenstein and the composer (third version)	28 May 1827 (first version, consisting of the first act only); 12 June 1829 (second version in 3 acts); 6 December 1837 (third version in 3 acts)	Berlin, Königliches Opernhaus (all versions)

== Sources ==
- Gerhard, Anselm (1992), "Spontini, Gaspare" in The New Grove Dictionary of Opera, ed. Stanley Sadie (London) ISBN 0-333-73432-7
- Some of the information in this article is taken from the related Dutch Wikipedia article.
