= Jean-Baptiste Esménard =

French journalist

Jean-Baptiste Esménard (1772–1842) was a French journalist during the Napoleonic era. He was brother to the poet Joseph-Alphonse Esménard and uncle of the artists Inès Esménard and Nathalie Elma d'Esménard.

== Life ==
At age 20, Esménard was a soldier who left France in 1792 to settle in Bourbon Spain, where he remained until the outbreak of the Peninsular War. There he supported Joseph Bonaparte, who reigned in Spain as King Joseph I from 1808 to 1813; but when Joseph I was defeated he returned to France. He was imprisoned in the Force Prison from 1810 to 1814 for his role in a Legitimist plot.

Esménard went on to become a journalist, contributing to Gazette de France, La Quotidienne, Journal des Débats and Mercure, and working as a translator. He translated a large part of the memoirs of the Spanish diplomat Manuel Godoy. In the 1836 English edition of this book, he is credited as editor and as author of the 65-page introduction, with his rank given as lieutenant-colonel.

== Honors and awards ==
- Knight of the Order of Legion of Honour
- Order of Saint Louis
