= Joseph-Alphonse Esménard =

French poet

Joseph-Alphonse Esménard (1770, in Pélissanne – 25 June 1811, in Fondi) was a French poet, brother of the journalist Jean-Baptiste Esménard and the father of the artists Inès Esménard and Nathalie Elma d'Esménard.

== Biography ==
In 1790, a year after the beginning of the French Revolution, Esménard was a royalist deputy. He was proscribed on 10 August 1792, and consequently left France to travel around Europe, going to England, the Netherlands, Germany, Italy, Constantinople (present-day Istanbul in Turkey), and Greece. Returning to Paris in 1797, he wrote for La Quotidienne, and after the Coup of 18 Fructidor in September, he spent two months in the Prison du Temple. He was forced to emigrate that same year.

He returned to France again after the Coup of 18 Brumaire in 1799, but afterwards left for Saint-Domingue as secretary to general Leclerc on the Saint-Domingue expedition to put down the uprising of Toussaint Louverture. On his return from this expedition, he was put in charge of censorship in the imperial theatres, a posting he gained for being a protege of the minister of police, Anne Jean Marie René Savary. Soon after this, he left once again to follow Admiral Villaret de Joyeuse to Martinique, where he served as a writer for The Mercury.

Esménard then came back to France, where he was censored of theatres and libraries and the Journal de l'Empire by the imperial government. In 1810, he was elected to the Académie française.

He was exiled to Italy for a few months after publishing a satirical article against one of Napoleon's envoys to Russia in the Journal de l'Empire. On his return trip, he died in a carriage accident at Fondi, near Naples.

== Works ==
Esménard is known for the poem entitled La Navigation, first published in eight verses in 1805, then re-edited to six verses in 1806.

Esménard also wrote Le triomphe de Trajan (The Triumph of Trajan), a three-act opera with music by Jean-François Lesueur, on the life of Trajan with allusions to Napoleon I of France. He also wrote the three-act opera Fernand Cortez ou la conquête du Mexique (Fernand Cortez or the Conquest of Mexico, 1809) in collaboration with Victor-Joseph-Étienne de Jouy, with music by Gaspare Spontini. He also wrote several verses, collected as La Couronne poétique de Napoléon (1807).
