= Pierre Dupont =

French poet and songwriter (1821–1870)

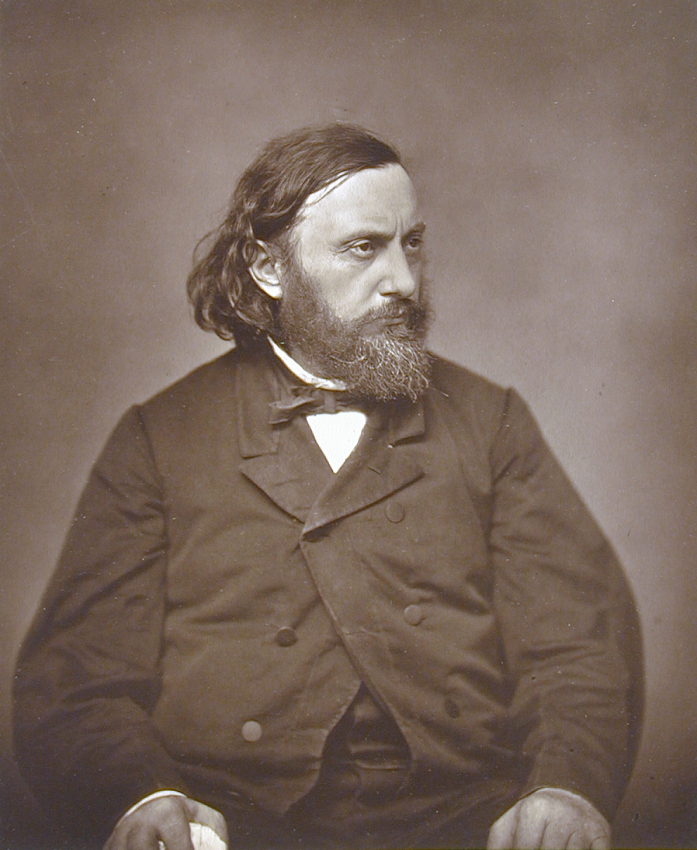
- Photograph by Étienne Carjat
- Born: 23 April 1821; Lyon, France
- Died: 25 July 1870 (aged 49)

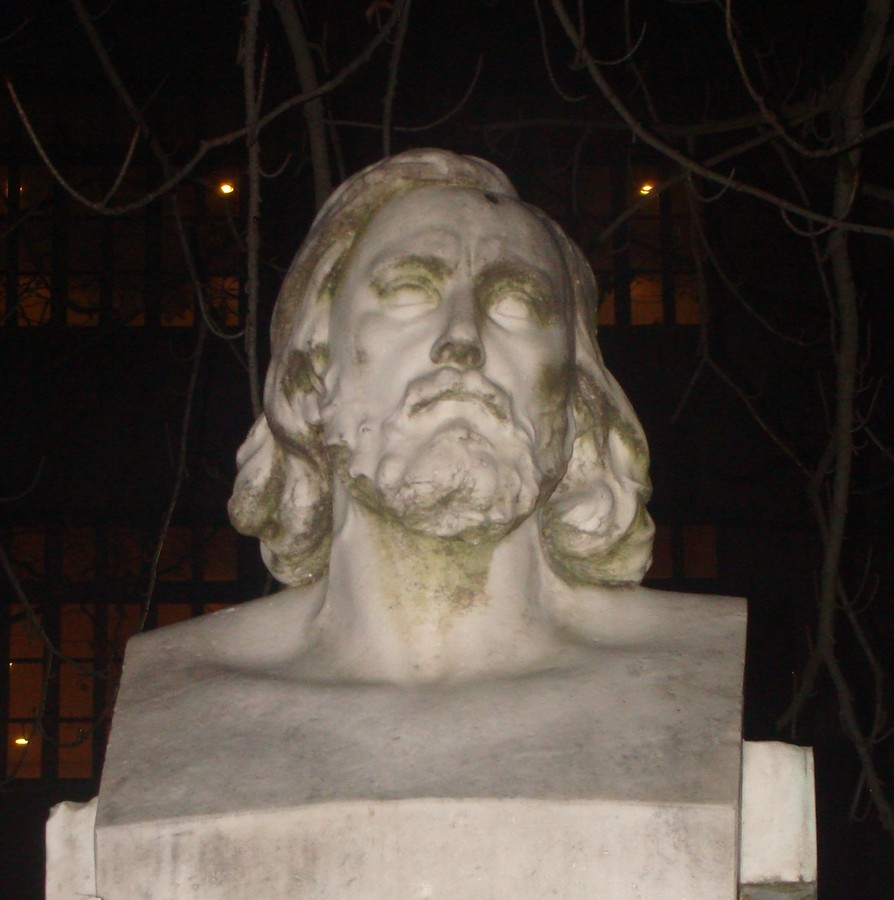
Bust of Pierre Dupont, erected in 1899, in Lyon

Pierre Dupont (23 April 1821 – 25 July 1870) was a French songwriter.

Dupont was born in Lyon as the son of a blacksmith. His mother died before he was five years old, and he was brought up in the country by his godfather, a village priest. He was educated at the seminary of L'Argentière, and was afterwards apprenticed to a notary at Lyon. In 1839 he found his way to Paris, and some of his poems were inserted, in the Gazette de France and the Quotidienne. Two years later he was saved from the conscription and enabled to publish his first volume – Les Deux Anges – through the exertions of a kinsman and of Pierre Lebrun.

In 1842 he received a prize from the academy, and worked for some time on the official dictionary. Gounod's appreciation of his peasant song, Les Bœufs (1846), settled his vocation as a songwriter. He had no theoretical knowledge of music, but he composed both the words and the melodies of his songs, the two processes being generally simultaneous. He himself remained so innocent of musical knowledge that he had to engage Ernest Reyer to write down his airs.

He sang his own songs, as they were composed, at the workmen's concerts in the Salle de la Fraternité du Faubourg Saint-Denis; the public performance of his famous "Le chant du pain" was forbidden; "Le chant des ouvriers" (1846) was even more popular; and in 1851 he paid the penalty of having become the poet laureate of the socialistic aspirations of the time by being condemned to seven years of exile from France.

The sentence was cancelled, and the poet withdrew for a time from participation in politics. He died at Lyon, where his later years were spent, on 25 July 1870.

His songs have appeared in various forms:

- Chants et chansons (3 vols., with music, 1852–1854)
- Chants et poesies (7th edition, 1862)

Among the best-known are "Le Braconnier", "Le Tisserand", "La Vache blanche", "La Chanson du blé", but many others might be mentioned of equal spontaneity and charm. His later works have not the same merit.

== See also ==
- Sainte-Beuve, Causeries du lundi, iv.;
- Charles Baudelaire, Notice sur P. Dupont (1849);
- Dbchaut, Biographie de Pierre Dupont (1871);
- Ch. Lenient, Posie patriotique en France (1889), ii. 352 et seq.
