= Inès Esménard =

French painter and portrait miniaturist (1789–1859)

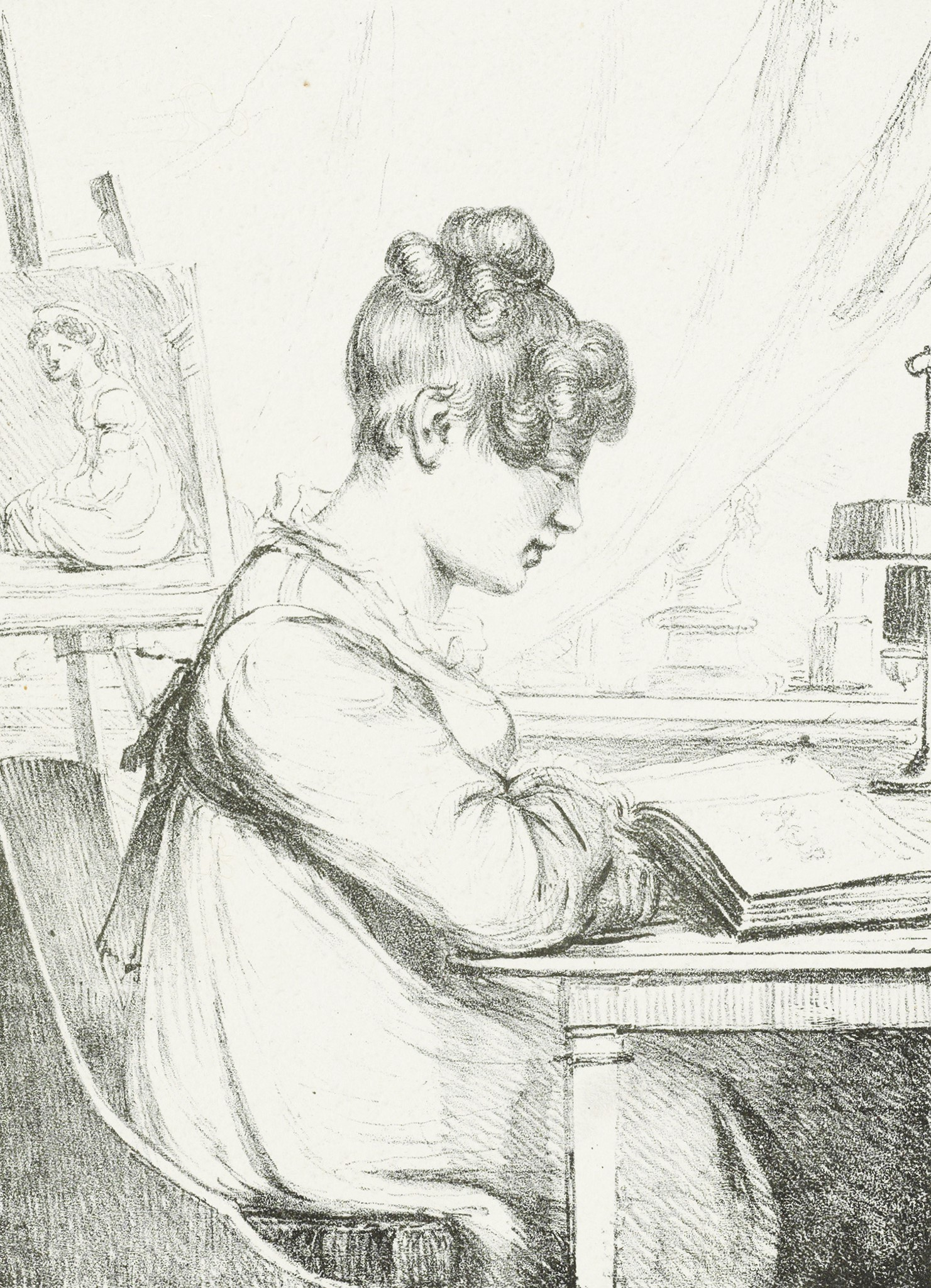
- Vivant Denon Portrait of Inès Esménard, lithograph ca. 1817–1820
- Born: Inès Esménard; 1789; Paris, France
- Died: 1859 (aged 69–70); Paris, France
- Education: Jean-François Colson, Jean-Pierre Franque, Jean-François Hollier
- Known for: portrait miniatures
- Movement: Neoclassicism
- Parents: Joseph-Alphonse Esménard (father); Jeanne Adolphine Kalegraber (mother)

Inès Esménard (1789–1859), sometimes known as Inès d’Esménard, was a 19th century French painter and portrait miniaturist.

== Biography ==
Inès Esménard was born in Paris, one of three daughters of the poet Joseph-Alphonse Esménard and Jeanne Adolphine de Kalkräber. Her father, a royalist, spent a good deal of her early childhood in exile due to the French Revolution but returned to France when Napoleon rose to power. Her sisters were Nathalie, who became a botanical artist, and Atala, and her uncle was the journalist Jean-Baptiste Esménard. In addition to being painter, she was a musician and spoke several languages besides French, including English and Spanish.

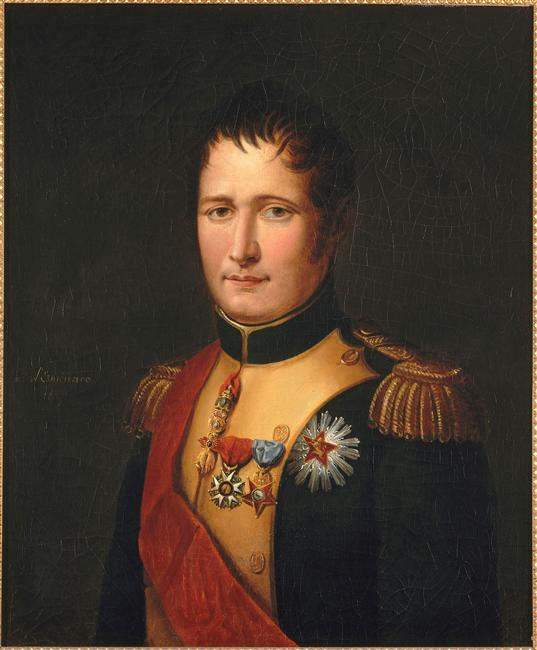
Inès Esménard, Portrait of Joseph Bonaparte, King of Spain, 1837, oil on canvas.

Esménard studied painting with Jean-François Colson and Jean-Pierre Franque and miniature painting with Jean-François Hollier. She showed actively in the Paris Salons from 1814 to 1851, exhibiting many portraits with anonymized titles (e.g. Portrait of Mme. L, 1834), but she also painted a number of notable figures of her time. In the Salon of 1819, where she was awarded a second prize medal, she showed miniatures of two well-known French actors: Mademoiselle Mars and Joséphine Duchesnois in the role of Electra, the latter painted for the art collector Count Nikolai Nikitich Demidov. She also showed portraits of Pierre-Joseph Redouté, her sister's teacher, and of both Napoleon Bonaparte and his brother Joseph. She produced various works inspired by Daniel Auber's opera Leicester, or the Chateau of Kénilworth, which premiered in Paris in 1823. Critics tended to speak of her work with moderate praise, referring to it as graceful, pretty, solidly painted, and well colored.

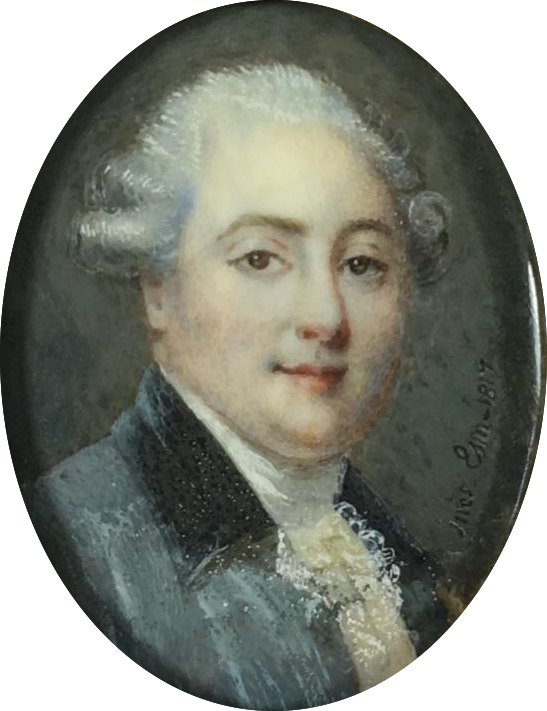
Portrait of Count Claude François Jean-Baptiste Donatien de Sesmaisons, 1817.

There are several portraits of Esménard in existence. One was painted by Jean-François Hollier when she was his student, and another by François-Joseph Navez, who painted all three Esménard sisters in 1815. There are two lithographs by Dominique Vivant Denon, one a group portrait (The Delights of the Country) that includes Esménard along with the novelist Sydney, Lady Morgan and the other a profile of Esménard seated and reading, with an easel and canvas behind her. There is also an Esménard self-portrait of 1839.
