= Pierre-Sébastien Laurentie =

French historian

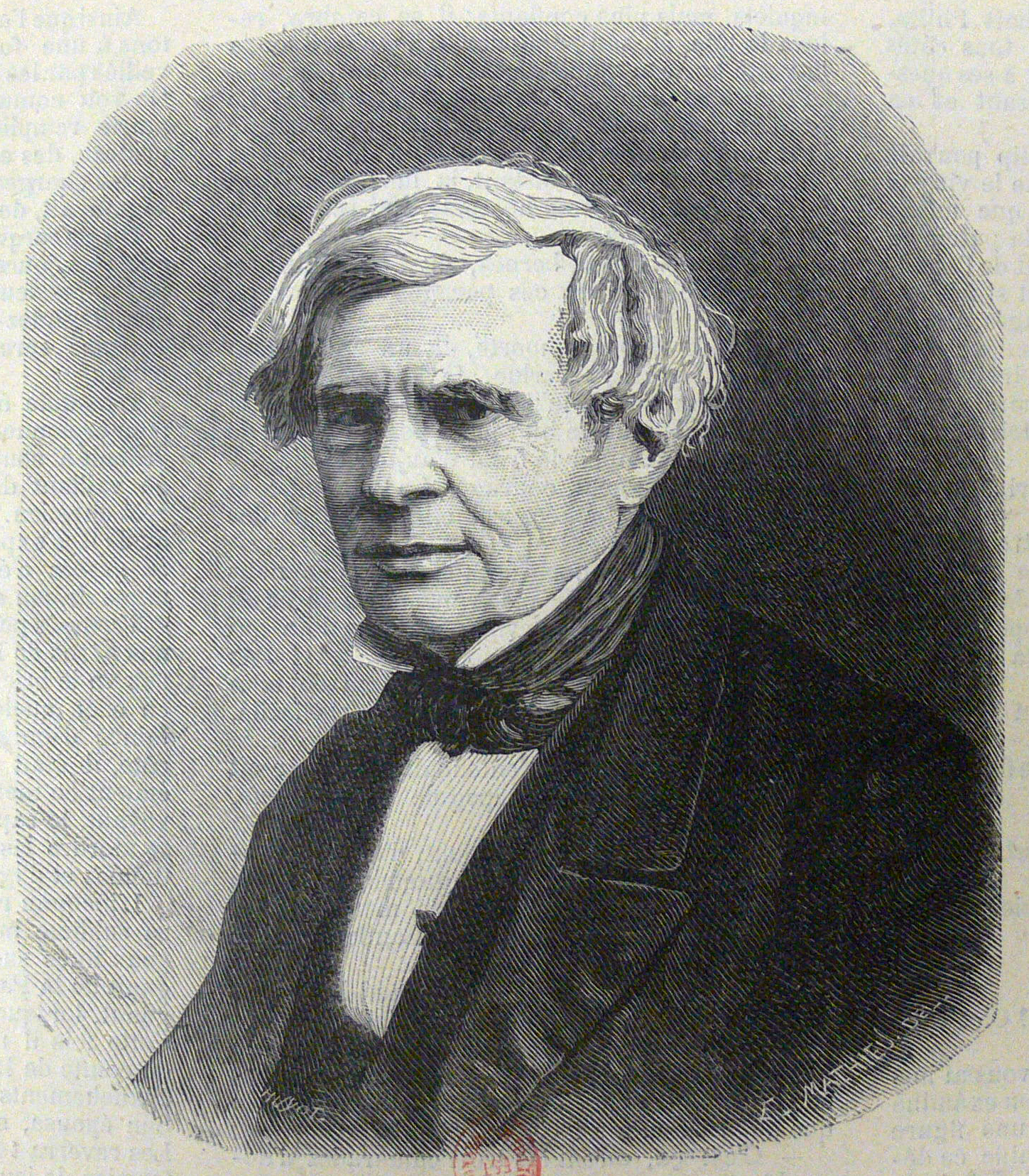
Pierre-Sébastien Laurentie

Pierre-Sébastien Laurentie (21 January 1793, in Houga, Gers, France – 9 February 1876) was a French writer and publicist, and a staunch anti-Gallican monarchist.

== Life ==
He went to Paris in the early part of 1817, and on 17 June of the same year entered the famous pious and charitable association known as "La Congrégation". Through the patronage of the Royalist writer Joseph-François Michaud, Laurentie became connected with the editorial staff of "La Quotidienne", in 1818; and in 1823 he was appointed Chief Inspector of Schools (inspecteur général des études), with the functions of which office he was able to combine his work as a publicist.

The complaint was made against his "Considérations sur les constitutions démocratiques" (1826) that it was aimed at the Villele Ministry, and censured its legislation in regard to the press. This charge, together with the attacks on the Ministry which appeared in "La Quotidienne" and the fact of Laurentie's friendly relations with Lamennais, led to Laurentie's dismissal from the office of Chief Inspector of Schools (5 November 1826).

"La Quotidienne" supported the Martignac Ministry until it issued the decrees of 16 June 1828, against the Jesuits, and the petits séminaires. Laurentie vigorously opposed these decrees. He purchased the old Benedictine college of Ponlevoy, which had existed for more than seven centuries and which, with the colleges of Juilly, Sorèze, and Vendôme, Napoleon had permitted to continue in existence side by side with the university. Laurentie's plan was to take advantage of this exceptional official authorization (which constituted a breach in the wall of the state university monopoly) to insure the prosperous existence of one independent educational institution.

As an octogenarian, Laurentie was the confidant of the Comte de Chambord, whose rights he daily championed in "L'Union".

== Works ==
Laurentie's early works, which established his reputation, included:

- "De l'éloquence publique et de son influence" (1819)
- "Etudes littéraires et morales sur les historiens latins" (1822)
- "De la justice au XIXe siècle" (1822)
- "Introduction à la philosophie" (1826)
- "Considérations sur les constitutions démocratiques" (1826)
- "Sur l'étude et l'enseignement des lettres" (1828)

After 1830, Laurentie, defeated politically, devoted his efforts as a publicist to three great causes: (1) freedom of education; (2) Legitimism; (3) Catholicism.

=== Freedom of education ===
Laurentie worked for freedom of education, and was involved with the commission which prepared the Falloux Laws. His writings on the topic include:

- "Lettres sur l'éducation" (1835–37)
- "Lettres sur la liberté d'enseignement" (1844)
- "L'Esprit chrétien dans les études" (1852)
- "Les Crimes de l'éducation française" (1872)

=== Legitimism ===
A committed Legitimist, Laurentie wrote for Le Rénovateur and La Quotidienne during the July Monarchy, and later for the Royalist "L'Union". His Legitimist writings include:

- "De la légitimité et de l'usurpation" (1830)
- "De la révolution en Europe" (1834)
- "De la démocratie et des périls de la société" (1849)
- "La Papauté" (1852)
- "Les Rois et le Pape" (1860)
- "Rome et le Pape" (1860)
- "Rome" (1861)
- "Le Pape et le Czar" (1862)
- "L'Athéisme social et l'Eglise, schisme du monde nouveau" (1869)
- "Histoire des ducs d'Orléans" (1832)
- "Histoire de France" (1841–55)

=== Catholic encyclopedia ===
As early as 1836, Laurentie conceived the idea of a Catholic encyclopedia, which he prefaced with a Catholic theory of the sciences.

In 1862, he published a pamphlet attacking scientific atheism. His Histoire de l'Empire Romain (1862) is an apology for infant Christianity, and his Philosophie de la prière (1864) contains the outpouring of a devout soul. His Souvenirs, left unfinished at his death, were published by his grandson in 1893.
