= Saint-Dizier =

- Subprefecture and commune
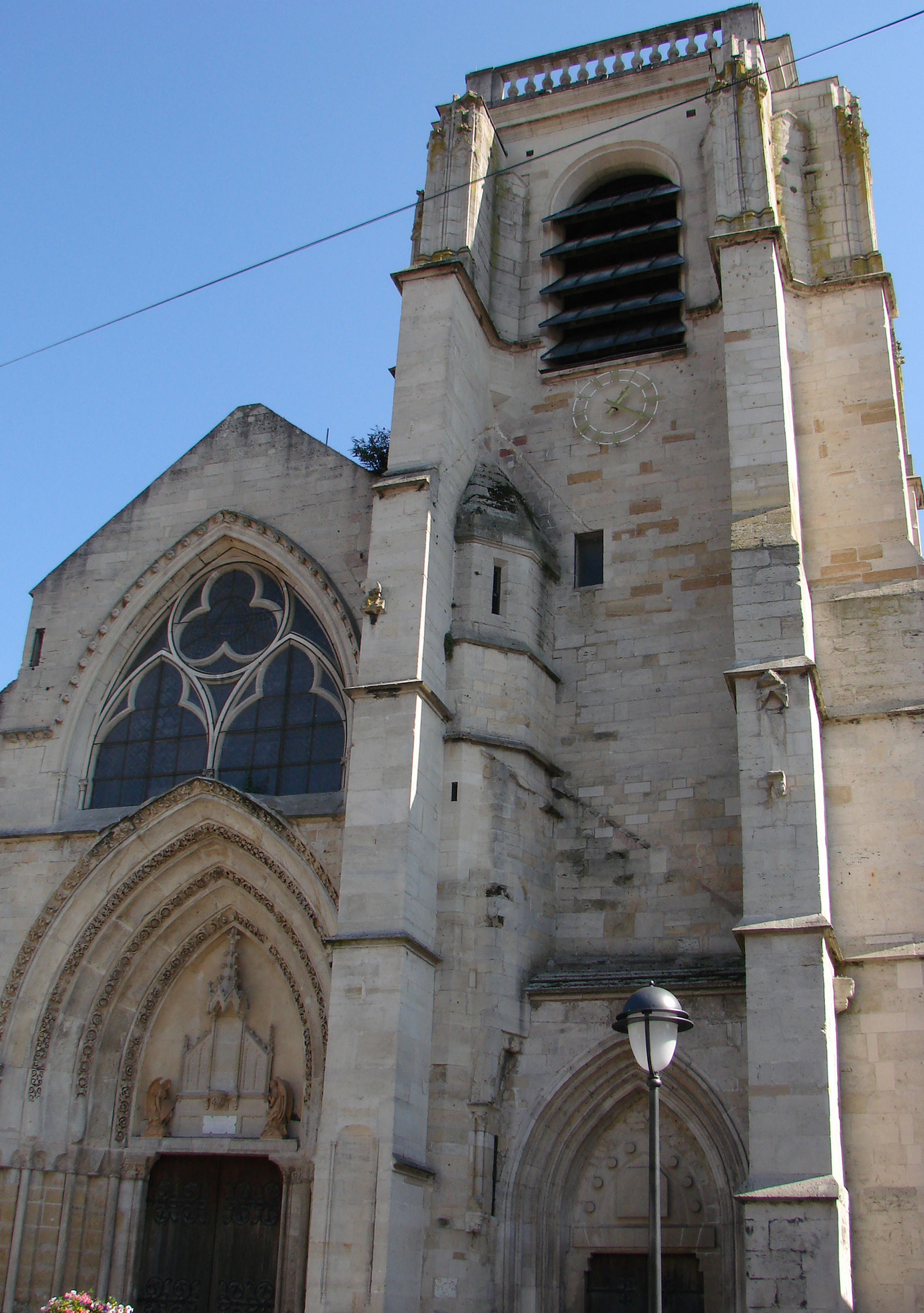
- The Notre-Dame church in Saint-Dizier

- Coat of arms
- Location of Saint-Dizier
- Location within France Location within Grand Est
- Coordinates: 48°38′18″N 4°56′59″E
- Country: France
- Region: Grand Est
- Department: Haute-Marne
- Arrondissement: Saint-Dizier
- Canton: Saint-Dizier-1, 2 and 3
- Intercommunality: CA Grand Saint-Dizier, Der et Vallées

Government
  - Mayor (2020–2026): Quentin Briere
- Area^{1}: 47.69 km^{2} (18.41 sq mi)
- Elevation: 146 m (479 ft)
- Population (2023): 22,858
  - Density: 479.3/km^{2} (1,241/sq mi)
- Time zone: UTC+01:00 (CET)
  - Summer (DST): UTC+02:00 (CEST)
- INSEE/Postal code: 52448 /52100
- ^{1} French Land Register data, which excludes lakes, ponds, glaciers > 1 km^{2} (0.386 sq mi or 247 acres) and river estuaries.

Saint-Dizier (French pronunciation: [sɛ̃.di.zje]) is a subprefecture of the Haute-Marne department in north-eastern France.

It has a population of about 23,000 and is a subprefecture of the department. Although Saint-Dizier is marginally the most populous commune in Haute-Marne, the préfecture (capital) resides in the somewhat smaller commune of Chaumont.

== Geography ==
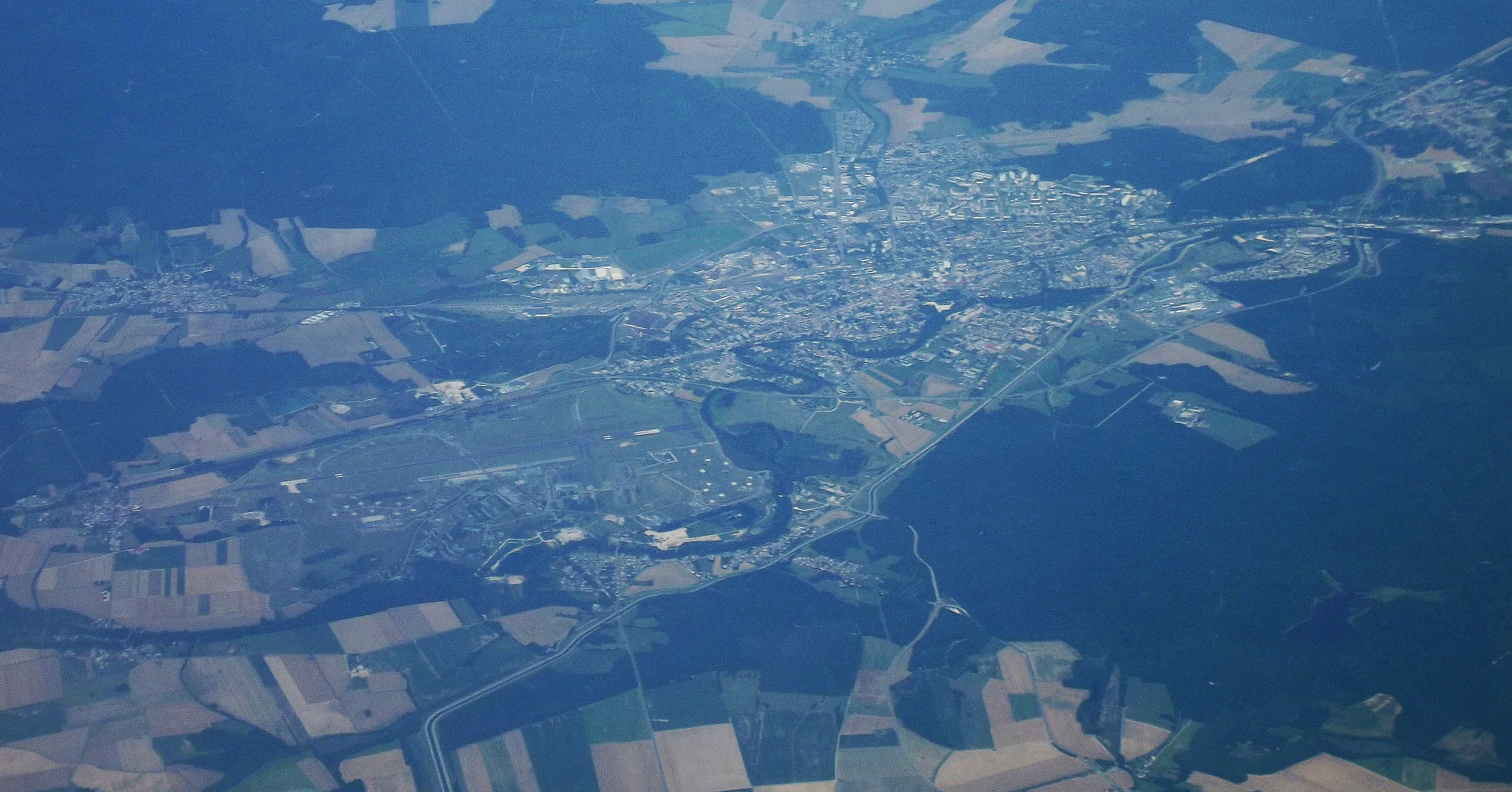
Aerial view

Located approximately 120 miles (193 km) east of Paris, halfway to Strasbourg, it is five miles from Western Europe's largest man-made lake, Lake Der-Chantecoq.

=== Climate ===
The climate in Saint-Dizier is oceanic according to the Köppen climate classification (Cfb code). However, far from any ocean or sea, Saint-Dizier experiences continental climate characteristics resulting in cold winters with freezing nights and cool days with temperatures staying in the single digits and warm to hot summers with frequent thunderstorms.

Climate data for Saint-Dizier (1991–2020 normals, extremes 1921–present)
Month	Jan	Feb	Mar	Apr	May	Jun	Jul	Aug	Sep	Oct	Nov	Dec	Year
Record high °C (°F)	17.7 (63.9)	22.6 (72.7)	27.1 (80.8)	29.4 (84.9)	33.1 (91.6)	38.1 (100.6)	41.4 (106.5)	40.4 (104.7)	35.5 (95.9)	30.3 (86.5)	23.4 (74.1)	18.6 (65.5)	41.4 (106.5)
Mean daily maximum °C (°F)	6.5 (43.7)	8.0 (46.4)	12.3 (54.1)	16.4 (61.5)	20.2 (68.4)	23.6 (74.5)	26.0 (78.8)	25.7 (78.3)	21.3 (70.3)	16.2 (61.2)	10.4 (50.7)	7.1 (44.8)	16.1 (61.0)
Daily mean °C (°F)	3.7 (38.7)	4.4 (39.9)	7.6 (45.7)	10.8 (51.4)	14.7 (58.5)	18.1 (64.6)	20.2 (68.4)	19.9 (67.8)	16.0 (60.8)	12.1 (53.8)	7.3 (45.1)	4.4 (39.9)	11.6 (52.9)
Mean daily minimum °C (°F)	0.8 (33.4)	0.8 (33.4)	2.9 (37.2)	5.3 (41.5)	9.3 (48.7)	12.5 (54.5)	14.5 (58.1)	14.2 (57.6)	10.7 (51.3)	7.9 (46.2)	4.1 (39.4)	1.7 (35.1)	7.1 (44.8)
Record low °C (°F)	−20.5 (−4.9)	−22.5 (−8.5)	−13.6 (7.5)	−6.0 (21.2)	−3.0 (26.6)	2.2 (36.0)	3.2 (37.8)	3.7 (38.7)	−0.2 (31.6)	−5.1 (22.8)	−11.7 (10.9)	−17.3 (0.9)	−22.5 (−8.5)
Average precipitation mm (inches)	63.2 (2.49)	61.2 (2.41)	59.6 (2.35)	54.6 (2.15)	68.3 (2.69)	57.5 (2.26)	69.6 (2.74)	65.1 (2.56)	70.9 (2.79)	75.4 (2.97)	70.6 (2.78)	78.5 (3.09)	794.5 (31.28)
Average precipitation days (≥ 1.0 mm)	11.1	10.9	10.2	9.5	10.4	9.2	9.4	8.8	9.0	11.4	12.1	13.1	125.2
Average snowy days	6.3	5.2	3.6	1.4	0.1	0.0	0.0	0.0	0.0	0.0	2.5	4.5	23.6
Average relative humidity (%)	86	81	78	73	74	75	74	77	81	85	87	86	79.8
Mean monthly sunshine hours	61.4	81.4	143.0	183.2	216.4	227.8	234.9	224.2	173.0	115.8	62.5	52.6	1,776.2
Source 1: Meteociel
Source 2: Infoclimat.fr (humidity and snowy days, 1961–1990)

== History ==
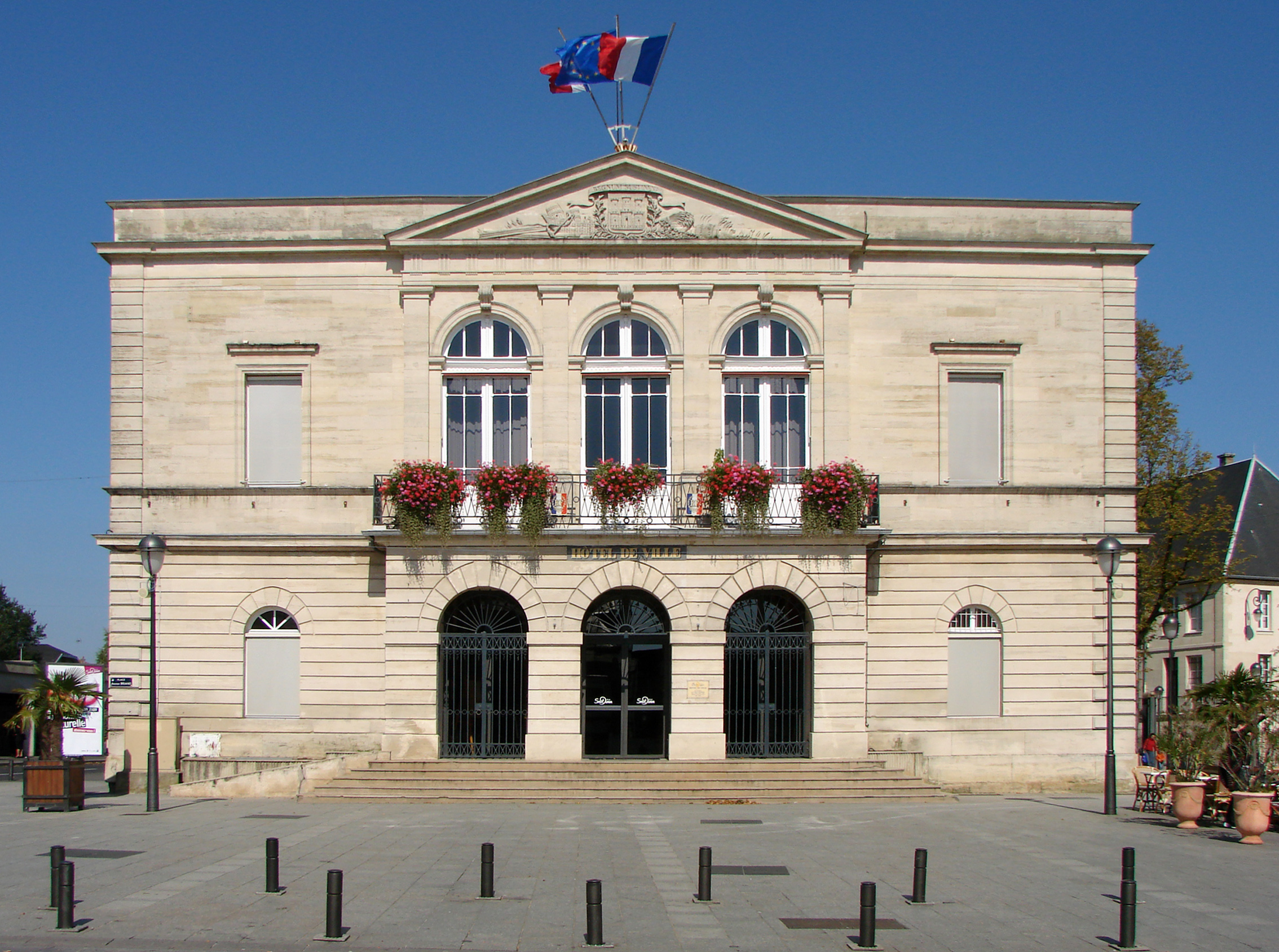
The Hôtel de Ville

Named after an unknown saint (possibly Desiderius of Fontenelle), the town originated as a fortified settlement around a thirteenth-century château, eventually becoming a royal fortress to guard the French kingdom's eastern approaches. The town was besieged and captured by Charles V, Holy Roman Emperor, in the summer of 1544. A fire in 1775 destroyed two-thirds of the town center. The Hôtel de Ville was completed in 1827.

The château was owned by the Orléans family until the French Revolution, was a base for German troops during World War II, and currently houses the Municipal Museum.

== Population ==
Historical population

Year	Pop.	±% p.a.
1793	5,500	—
1800	5,824	+0.82%
1806	5,614	−0.61%
1821	5,817	+0.24%
1831	6,163	+0.58%
1836	6,366	+0.65%
1841	5,705	−2.17%
1846	7,136	+4.58%
1851	7,429	+0.81%
1856	7,642	+0.57%
1861	8,077	+1.11%
1866	10,170	+4.72%
1872	11,229	+1.66%
1876	12,754	+3.23%
1881	12,773	+0.03%
1886	13,458	+1.05%
1891	13,372	−0.13%
1896	13,947	+0.85%
1901	14,601	+0.92%

Year	Pop.	±% p.a.
1906	14,661	+0.08%
1911	16,019	+1.79%
1921	17,576	+0.93%
1926	19,019	+1.59%
1931	18,292	−0.78%
1936	19,149	+0.92%
1946	19,532	+0.20%
1954	25,515	+3.40%
1962	34,407	+3.81%
1968	36,616	+1.04%
1975	37,266	+0.25%
1982	35,189	−0.82%
1990	33,552	−0.59%
1999	30,900	−0.91%
2007	26,962	−1.69%
2012	25,280	−1.28%
2017	24,012	−1.02%
2023	22,858	−0.82%

Source: EHESS and INSEE (1968-2023)

== Notable people ==
Saint-Dizier is the birthplace of

- Baroque-era musicologist André Pirro
- Organist André Isoir
- Conductor Jean-Paul Penin
- Physicist and materials scientist Christian Janot
- Former world middleweight boxing champion Marcel Thil. A street is named in his honor
- Judoka and Olympic gold medalist Axel Clerget

== See also ==
- Communes of the Haute-Marne department
- Saint-Dizier – Robinson Air Base
