= Messe solennelle (Berlioz) =

1824 mass setting by Hector Berlioz, discovered in 1991

- Mass by Hector Berlioz
- Title page of the autograph score
- Text: Mass and other liturgical texts
- Language: Latin
- Performed: 10 July 1825
- Movements: 13
- Scoring: 3 soloists; chorus; orchestra

Messe solennelle is a setting of the Catholic missa solemnis by the French composer Hector Berlioz. It was written in 1824, when the composer was twenty, and first performed at the Saint-Roch, Paris, on 10 July 1825, and again at the Saint-Eustache in 1827. After this, Berlioz claimed to have destroyed the entire score, except for the Resurrexit, but in 1991 a Belgian schoolteacher, Frans Moors, came across a copy of the work in an organ gallery in Antwerp, and it has since been revived.

Elements of Berlioz's Requiem and Symphonie fantastique appear in the Messe solennelle in somewhat altered versions. Themes from the Messe solennelle occur in the first half of his opera Benvenuto Cellini.

== Forces and structure ==
Scored for soprano, tenor, (prominent) bass, mixed chorus, and large orchestra, including

Piccolo (opt.), 2 flutes, 2 oboes, 2 clarinets (C) 2 bassoons, 4 horns, 4 trumpets, 3 trombones (ATB), serpent, buccin (or ophicleide), timpani, cymbals Tamtam, Harps (opt.), and strings

Its movements are:

- Kyrie
- Gloria
- Gratias
- Quoniam
- Credo
- Incarnatus
- Crucifixus
- Resurrexit
- Motet pour l'Offertoire
- Sanctus
- O salutaris hostia
- Agnus Dei
- Domine salvum fac

== Background ==
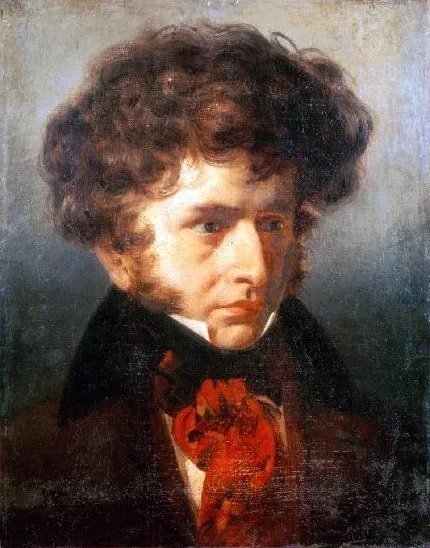
Berlioz when a student at the Villa Medici, 1832

Berlioz was still composing his mass late in 1824, when he made arrangements to have it performed at the Church of Saint-Roch. He felt he needed a conductor for the large forces required. His teacher, Jean-François Le Sueur, was co-director of the Chapel Royale, where Henri Valentino, a violinist at the Chapel, but also one of the two chief conductors of the Paris Opera orchestra, had recently applied for the conducting post at the Chapel. Berlioz approached Valentino, who examined the score and agreed to conduct the performance, despite grave doubts concerning the forces at his disposal. The parts were being copied by choirboys from Saint-Roch when Berlioz celebrated his 21st birthday on 11 December. The concert was scheduled for 28 December, and the church sent invitations on behalf of the choirboys to newspapers, friends and likely patrons. The general rehearsal was scheduled for 27 December. Berlioz described it in his memoirs:

On the day of the full rehearsal our 'huge forces' assembled and proved to consist of a chorus of twenty (fifteen tenors and five basses), a dozen choirboys, nine violins, a viola, an oboe, a horn and a bassoon. My shame and despair at offering the celebrated conductor of one of the world's leading orchestras such a rabble of musicians may be imagined. 'It's all right,' Masson [choirmaster of Saint-Roch] kept on saying, 'everybody will turn up for the performance tomorrow. Come along, start rehearsing!' Valentino, with a resigned air, gave the signal and they began; but after a few moments a halt had to be called. The parts were a mass of mistakes and everyone was pointing them out at once: key signatures without flats and sharps, ten bars' rest missing, thirty bars of music left out. All was confusion. I suffered the torments of the damned; and my long-cherished vision of a full orchestral performance had, for the moment, to be abandoned.

Berlioz had heard enough to make important revisions to the score, after which he copied out all the new parts himself. He also realized he needed to hire professional musicians, if his work was to be performed properly, but had little idea of how to finance such a performance. Nevertheless, Valentino remained supportive and agreed to conduct, when circumstances improved.

Berlioz's friend, Humbert Ferrand, suggested Berlioz ask for a loan from François-René de Chateaubriand, one of Berlioz's literary heroes, whose Génie du Christianisme later served as inspiration for the program of the Symphonie fantastique. Berlioz wrote a letter asking him for 1,200 francs (or possibly 1,500), or in lieu of that to put in a good word with the authorities, but he received only a prompt and courteous reply, which arrived on 1 January 1825:

Paris, 31 December 1824

You ask me, sir, for twelve hundred francs. I have not got them. If I had, they would be yours. I have no means, either, of being useful to you with the Government. I sympathize keenly with your difficulties. I love art and honour artists. But sometimes talent owes its success to the trials it has had to endure, and the hour of triumph compensates for all that one has suffered. My dear sir, please accept my regrets—they are very real.

In late January 1825 he tried without success to arrange a performance at the Church of Sainte-Geneviève (today the Panthéon), with Henri-Étienne Dérivis, a bass at the Paris Opera, to sing the solos.

Berlioz wrote home to his sister Nanci about the failed rehearsal, and his father, who staunchly opposed his son's pursuit of a career as a composer, learned of it and cut off his son's allowance on 24 February, beginning a period of financial hardship for Berlioz that lasted until the end of the 1820s.

The curé of Saint-Roch had selected 10 July, the feast of the Sacred Heart, for a performance of the Mass, and some musicians and singers from the Chapel Royale were recruited to form the core of the orchestra and chorus. They became unavailable when King Charles X decided to go to Saint-Cloud on the day of the premiere. Berlioz's friend, Albert Du Boys, used his contacts to obtain an interview between Berlioz and Sosthènes I de La Rochefoucauld, the head of the newly created Department of the Arts, but despite two visits, all Berlioz received was permission to hire the Paris Opera orchestra, at a cost of a thousand francs.

A month before the scheduled concert, he ran into his friend Augustin de Pons in the foyer of the Paris Opera house, the Salle Le Peletier. De Pons had been at the rehearsal in December and asked Berlioz about his Mass. When he learned of the situation he promised to arrange for funding to hire the Opéra chorus and a professional orchestra. The orchestra was formed from the Opera orchestra and the best of the players at the Théâtre-Italien. Berlioz even sought and received the endorsement of Raphaël Duplantys, the Opera's Director.

A few days before the premiere, Berlioz and his friend Ferrand visited the offices of some newspapers and journals, giving invitations to send a critic and to print announcements of the concert. Berlioz knew the staff at the Corsaire, and Ferrand, those at the Gazette de France, the Diable boiteux, and Le Globe.

== Premiere and initial reception ==
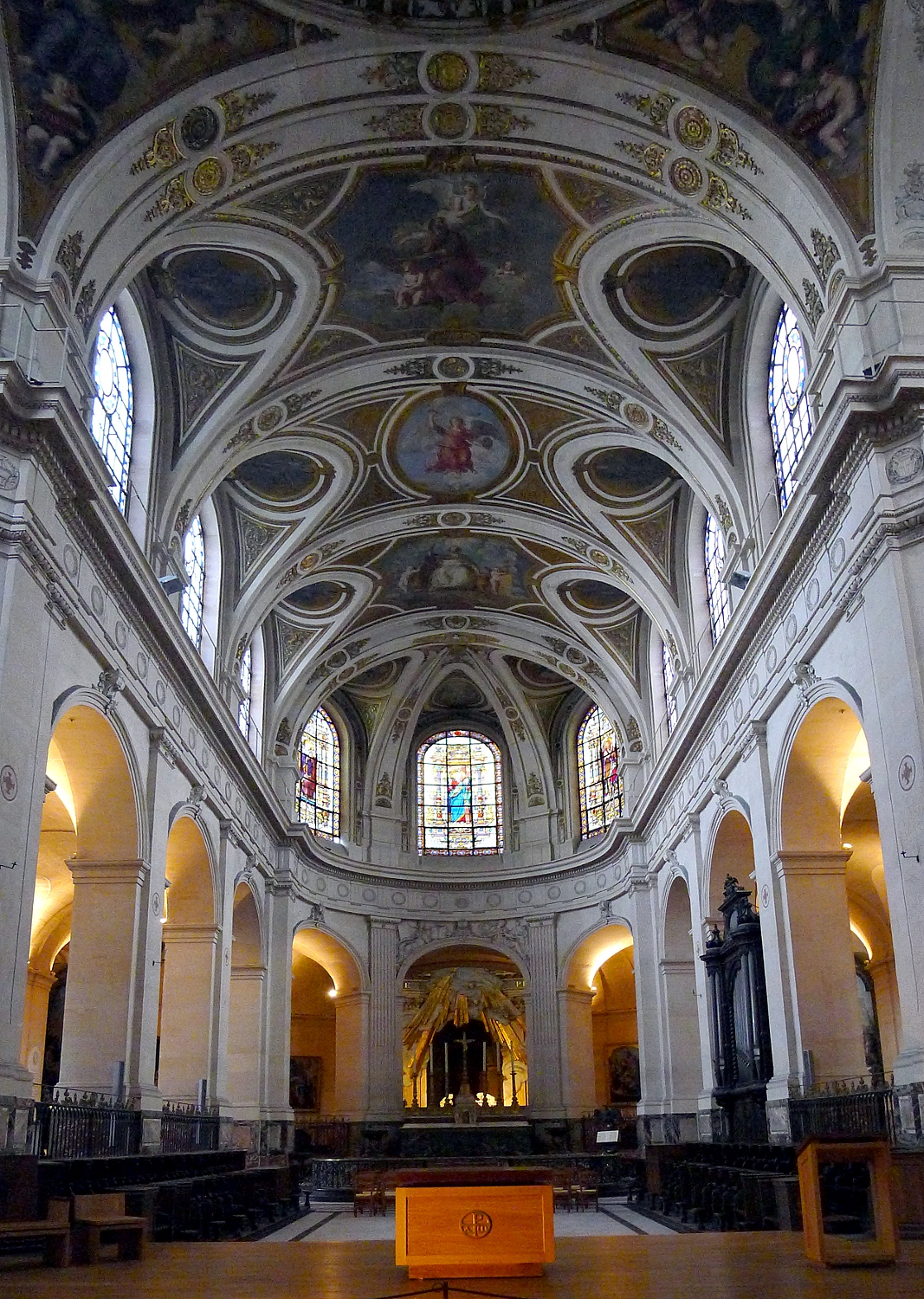
Interior of the Église Saint-Roch

The Messe solennelle was premiered on 10 July 1825 at the Church of Saint-Roch in Paris by an orchestra and chorus of 150, conducted by Henri Valentino. The bass soloist was Ferdinand Prévost. The work made a strong impression on a respectable audience. Many critics attended and wrote reviews, and Berlioz received kudos from many of the musicians.

Berlioz told his friend Albert Du Boys that the dramatic movements (the Kyrie, the Crucifixus, the Et iterum venturus, the Domine salvum, and the Sanctus) had the greatest impact:

When I heard the crescendo at the end of the Kyrie my chest swelled with the orchestra and my heart pounded in time with the strokes of the timpanist. I don't know what I was saying, but at the end of the piece Valentino said to me, "My friend, try to keep calm, if you don't want to have me lose my head."

Berlioz played the tam-tam in the Et iterum venturus and struck it so hard, that the whole church resounded. The critic of the Quotidienne wrote that in this movement, "M. Berlioz has given untrammeled scope to his imagination." Of the quieter movements, the O salutaris was considered by the critic of the Corsaire to be music "of the noblest and most religious effect". Madame Lebrun of the chorus told Berlioz, "Damn, my boy: now there's an un-worm-eaten O Salutaris, and I defy those little bastards in the counterpoint classes at the Conservatoire to write a movement so tightly knit, so bloody religious."

His teacher, Jean-François Le Sueur, who attended with his wife and daughters, said:

Let me embrace you! By jove, you're not going to be a doctor or an apothecary, you're going to be a great composer. You have genius – I say it because it is true. There are too many notes in your Mass, you have let yourself be carried away, but in all this ebullience of ideas not a single intention misfires, all your pictures are true. The effect is extraordinary. And I want you to know that everybody felt it. I had chosen a seat by myself, in a corner, on purpose to observe the audience, and you may take my word for it that if it hadn't been in a church you would have received three or four right royal rounds of applause.

== Modern performances ==
The first modern performance was conducted by John Eliot Gardiner at the church of St. Petri in Bremen on 3 October 1993. First French performance at the Vézelay basilica, on october 5th 1993 conducted by Jean-Paul Penin. Other performances include three given at the 2012 Salzburg Festival, with the Vienna Philharmonic under Riccardo Muti.

== Recordings ==
- Christa Pfeiler (soprano), Ruben Velasquez (tenor), Jacques Perroni (bass), National Kraków Choir and Philharmony, conducted by Jean-Paul Penin, live on October 5, 1993, at the Basilica of Sainte-Marie-Madeleine in Vézelay (France-Télévision, France-Musique, Accord Universal Music Group). First world recording.
- Donna Brown (soprano), Jean-Luc Viala (tenor), Gilles Cachemaille (bass-barytone), Orchestre Révolutionnaire et Romantique, conducted by John Eliot Gardiner, live, at Westminster Cathedral (Philips, 1994).
- Rosa Lamoreaux (soprano), Gene Tucker (tenor), Terry Cook (bass-baritone), Washington National Cathedral Choral Society & Orchestra, conducted by J. Reilly Lewis, live at National Cathedral (North American premiere) (Koch, 1994).
- Genia Kühmeier (soprano), Giuseppe Sabbatini (tenor), Ildar Abdrazakov (bass), Coro e Orchestra del Teatro alla Scala di Milano, conducted by Riccardo Muti, live in December 2004 (RAI-TV).
- Julia Kleiter (soprano), Saimir Pirgu (tenor), Ildar Abdrazakov (bass), Konzertvereinigung Wiener Staatsopernchor, Vienna Philharmonic Orchestra, conducted by Riccardo Muti, live in Salzburg in August 2012 (ORF).
- Adriana Gonzalez (soprano), Julien Behr (ténor), Andreas Wolf (bass), Le Concert Spirituel Chœur et Orchestre, conducted by Hervé Niquet, recorded in the Chapelle Royale of Château de Versailles in June 2019 (Alpha Classics)

== Bibliography ==
- Cairns, David, editor and translator (1969). The memoirs of Hector Berlioz, 2002 edition. New York: Alfred A. Knopf. ISBN 9780375413919.
- Cairns, David (1999). Berlioz. Volume one. The Making of an Artist 1803-1832. Berkeley, California: University of California Press. ISBN 9780713993851 (hardcover). ISBN 9780520240568 (paperback).
- Holoman, D. Kern (1989). Berlioz. Cambridge, Massachusetts: Harvard University Press. ISBN 9780674067783.
- Hugh Macdonald: Berlioz ("The Master Musicians", J.M.Dent, 1982)
- Association Nationale Hector Berlioz, Bulletin de liaison, n°44, January 2010.
