= Jean-Paul Penin =

French conductor

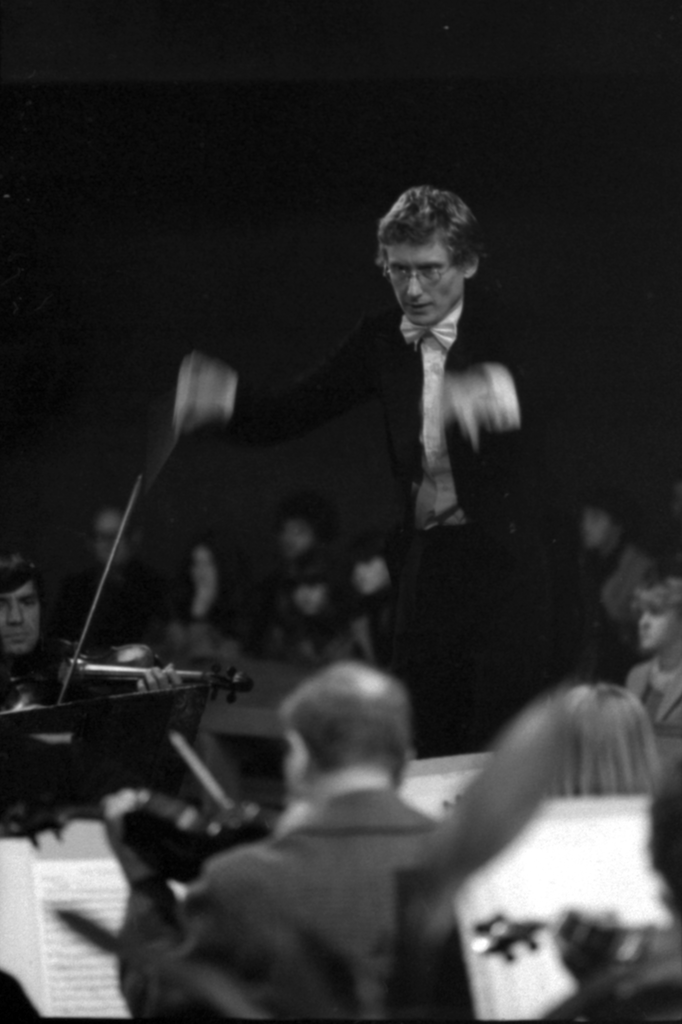
Jean-Paul Penin, Orchestre Philharmonique de Strasbourg, 1980

Jean-Paul Penin (born 31 December 1949, Saint-Dizier) is a French composer and conductor.

== Biography ==
Jean-Paul Penin is a graduate of the Strasbourg Conservatory of Music (double bass, chamber music, 1978) and the University of Strasbourg where he obtained a PhD. in biophysics in 1974 and a Master's degree in musicology in 1978. He went on to the Paris Conservatoire National Supérieur de Musique where he studied musicology with Yves Gérard in 1978. He was a Fulbright scholar in 1979 at the San Francisco Conservatory of Music where he studied analysis with John Coolidge Adams and obtained a M.A. in conducting.

In 1979, Penin won an award at the international Tokyo Min-On Competition. From 1980 to 1981 he was Alain Lombard's assistant at the Strasbourg Philharmonic Orchestra and from 1982 to 1984 Lorin Maazel's assistant at the Vienna Staatsoper. He was the principal guest conductor of the Kraków Philharmonic Orchestra at the Kraków Philharmonic from 1989 to 1993.

In May 1986, Penin stepped in with just one night's notice, for a live Dutch radio symphony concert (NOS). Again, in 1990, when he was just back from a Russian tour, he performed at the Concertgebouw in Amsterdam, for the Dutch première of Olivier Messiaen's piano concerto La Ville d'en haut, in the presence of the composer, (Yvonne Loriod, soloist, TV broadcast, Radio Philharmonic). This had been premièred by Pierre Boulez in New York one year before. (De Volkskrant, November 12, 1990).

Penin was given the exclusive rights by Bärenreiter for the French première of Berlioz's Messe Solennelle, which had lately been discovered. He recorded the work (first world recording, Vezelay Basilica, 7 October 1993, Radio France, Accord-Universal and France Télévisions), and was invited to conduct the work all over the world, including the Teatro Colón in Buenos-Aires in May 1998 and at the Santander International Festival in 2003.

In September 2000, he was invited to Prague for the Dvořák Festival, with the National Radio-Symphony Orchestra. Following this concert, he was invited to tour with the orchestra (Berlioz, l'Enfance du Christ, Madrid, Auditorio Nacional, 2002 and 2003 with Spontini's Fernand Cortez). Three years in a row, the Concertgebouw series invited him for tour concerts (Berlioz, Saint-Saëns, Rachmaninov, Tchaikovsky).

One of his concerts (Bartók-Debussy, 2002) with the Dresden Philharmonic was broadcast live on the radio in 24 countries. This was followed by a Berlioz program at the Dresden Semperoper Staatskapelle in 2004. The previous year the Norwegian National Opera and Ballet had invited him to conduct Poulenc's Dialogues des Carmélites. After two series with the KBS Symphony Orchestra in Seoul, he was invited by the Korean National Opera to take part in a production of Offenbach's Tales of Hoffmann).

== Official awards ==
- Poland: Order of Merit, Officer (1993)
- France: Ordre des Arts et des Lettres, Chevalier (1997)

== Sources ==
- Entry "Jean-Paul Penin", Dictionnaire des interprètes, Paris, Laffont, collection "Bouquins".

== Compositions ==
- Nuits Parisiennes, Suite for orchestra. Premiered in Milano (December 12, 2004, Orchestra Pomeriggi musicali)
- Nuits Parisiennes, complete ballet

== Recordings ==
Jean-Paul Penin is praised by the musical press for his interest for forgotten masterpieces. {TAZ 03 06 / Opéra International 01 97}

- Beethoven's cantatas Joseph II and Leopold II.
- Berlioz's Messe Solennelle.
- Carl Maria von Weber's Der Freischütz, French Berlioz's version with recitatives.
- Spontini's Fernand Cortez, which he also premiered in Paris (2002), under the sponsorship of the Napoleon Foundation and stage-premiered at the Erfurt Opera House, 2006). Fernand Cortez
- Chabrier's opera Gwendoline, whose recording was praised as "one of last years' most interesting recordings" (opéra international).
- Antonio Sacchini's Oedipe à Colone, given by King Louis XVI for the opening of the Versailles Royal Palace opera house.

== Writings and links ==
- Les Baroqueux ou le Musicalement Correct, Editions Gründ, Paris, 2000.
- NMZ, Neue Muzikzeitung.
- L'Interprète face à la partition. Muséographie ou appropriation ? Prague National Music Academy 2000
- Messe Solennelle
  - Site Berlioz 2003
  - Les Premières Armes du jeune Berlioz: La Messe Solennelle, Revue Internationale d'Etudes musicales, Editions Jean-Michel Place, Paris, 2004.]
  - "La Messe Solennelle de Berlioz", Le Monde, October 13, 1993
  - "La Messe Solennelle de Berlioz", La Croix, October 13, 1993
  - "De Ontdekking van Berlioz's Messe Solennelle", (Werner Gladines, 2007, Dutch/French/English)
