= Canton of Saint-Dizier-2 =

Coordinates: 48.64°N 4.94°E

The canton of Saint-Dizier-2 is an administrative division of the Haute-Marne department, northeastern France. It was created at the French canton reorganisation which came into effect in March 2015. Its seat is in Saint-Dizier.

It consists of the following communes:

- Saint-Dizier (partly)
