= Hôtel de Ville, Saint-Dizier =

Town hall in Saint-Dizier, France

Hôtel de Ville
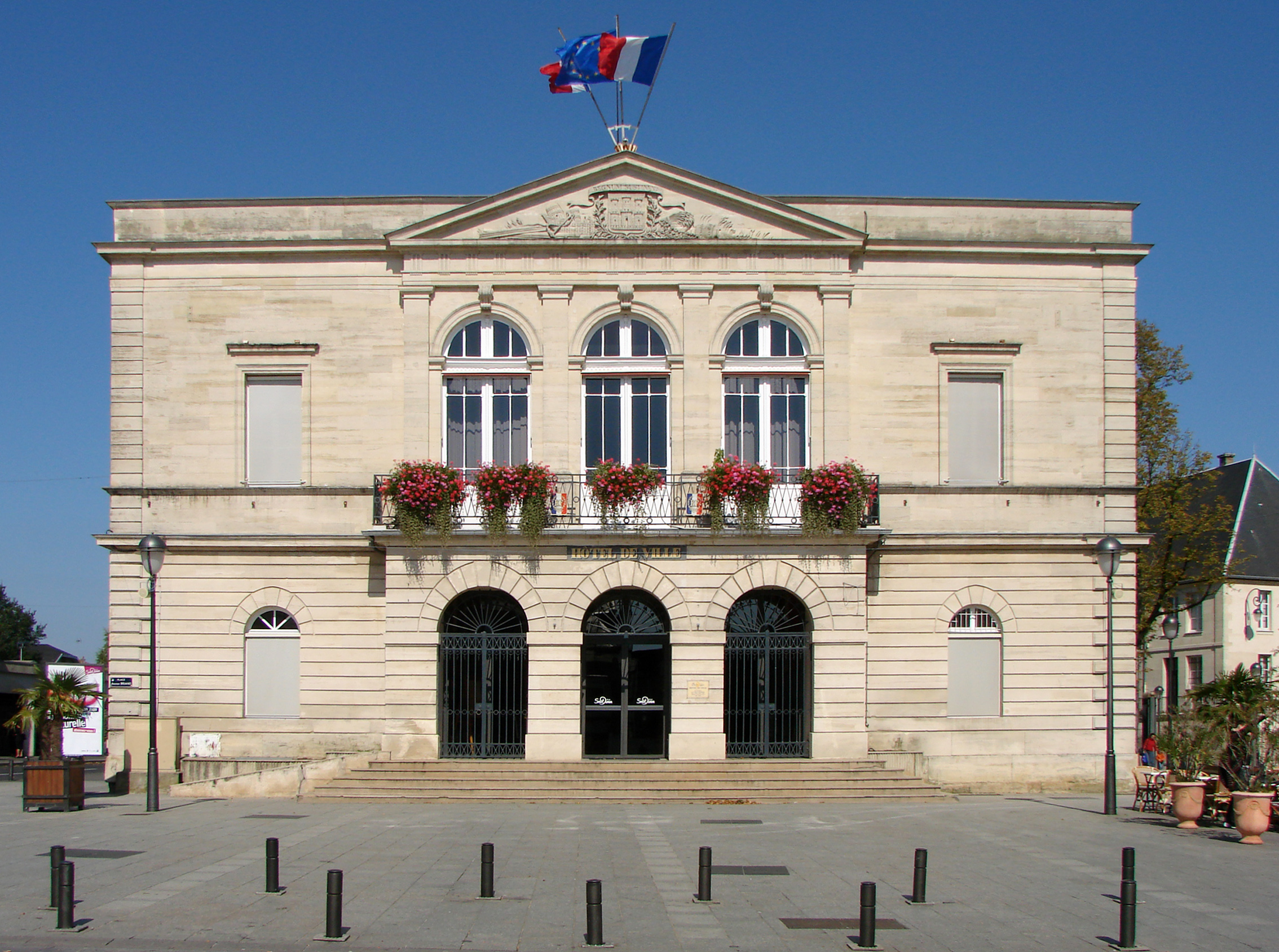
- The main frontage of the Hôtel de Ville in October 2008
- Interactive map of the Hôtel de Ville area

General information
- Type: City hall
- Architectural style: Neoclassical style
- Location: Saint-Dizier, France
- Coordinates: 48.6375°N 4.9475°E
- Completed: 1827

Design and construction
- Architect: Louis-Bernard Guyton

The Hôtel de Ville (French pronunciation: [otɛl də vil], City Hall) is a municipal building in Saint-Dizier, Haute-Marne, in northeastern France, standing on Place Aristide Briand.

== History ==
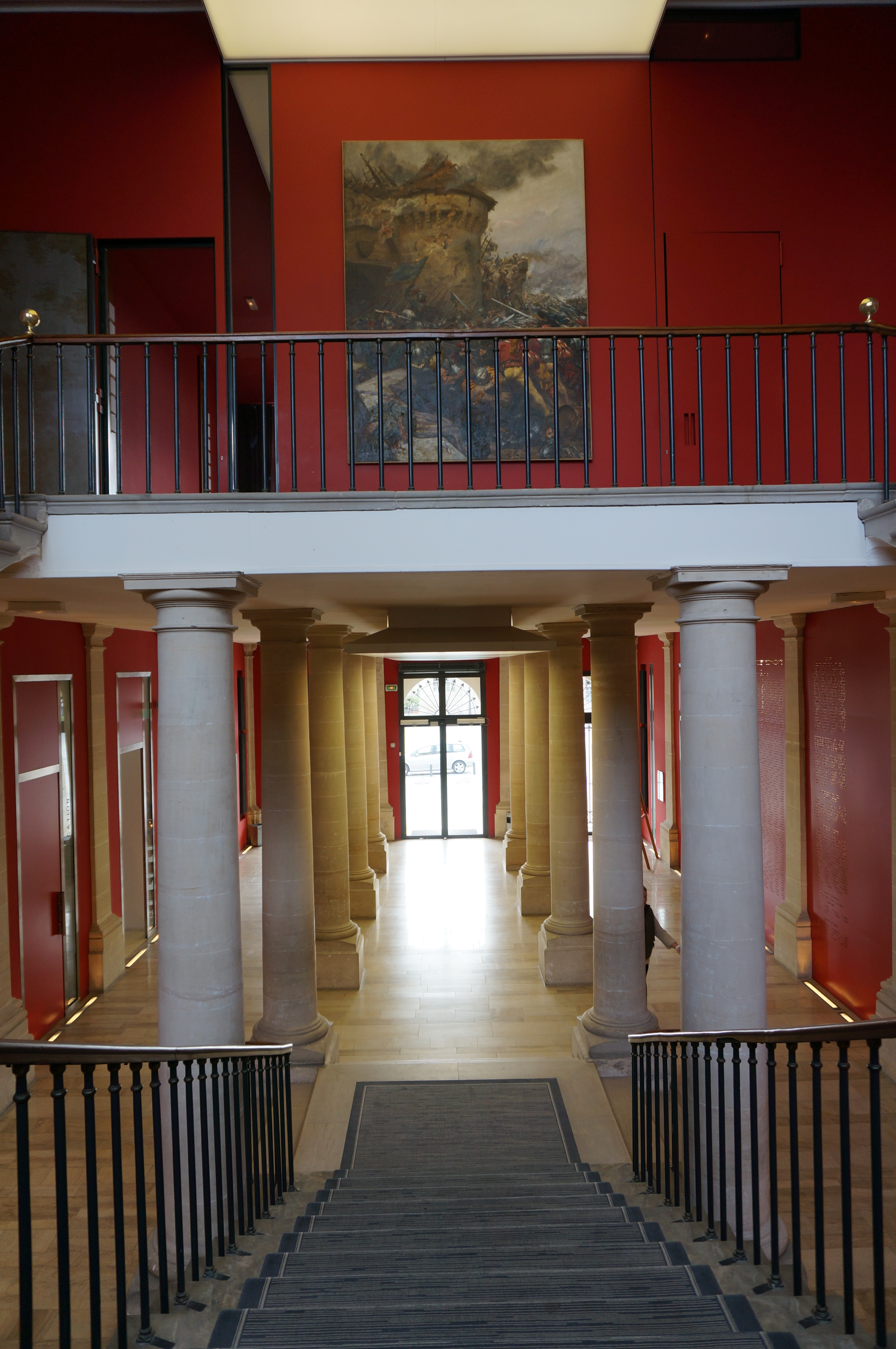
The entrance hall

Under the ancien régime, the aldermen held their meetings in a building on the south side of Rue Gambetta. However, after a major fire devastated two-thirds of the houses in the town in 1775, the site was cleared and, two centuries later, was occupied by a Monoprix supermarket. Following the French Revolution, the new town council initially held their meetings in the Château of Saint-Dizier. After a couple of years, they changed the venue to the Couvent des Capucins (Convent of the Capuchins), which later formed part of the École Secondaire Technique de l'Immaculée Conception (ESTIC).

After finding this arrangement unsatisfactory, the council decided to commission a new town hall on open land to the west of the old town. The site they selected was a section of the old moat adjacent to the medieval walls of the town: the moat had been filled in with the rubble from the houses which had been destroyed in the fire. Because of this, the ground was unstable and therefore 326 huge oak piles were driven into the ground to provide a solid foundation for the new building. A vaulted passageway through the medieval walls was preserved in the basement of the new structure.

The foundation stone for the new building was laid by the mayor, Joseph Varnier Cournon, on 17 July 1825. It was designed by Louis-Bernard Guyton in the neoclassical style, built in ashlar stone and was officially opened by Cournon on 29 August 1827.

The design involved a symmetrical main frontage of five bays facing onto Place Aristide Briand. The central section of three bays, which was slightly projected forward, featured three round headed openings with voussoirs on the ground floor, and three round headed French doors with moulded surrounds and keystones and a balcony on the first floor. On the first floor, the central section was flanked by Doric order pilasters supporting an entablature with triglyphs, and a pediment with the coat of arms of the town in the tympanum. The outer bays were fenestrated by round headed windows with voussoirs on the ground floor and by casement windows with cornices on the first floor. Internally, the principal room was the Salle du Conseil (council chamber).

In 1905, a memorial created by the sculptor, Philéas-Hector Carillon, was unveiled in front of the town hall to commemorate the heroic resistance by the people of the town against the army of Charles V during the siege in summer 1544, part of the Italian War of 1542–1546. The memorial showed a female figure holding a flag, supported by three male figures depicting Louis IV de Bueil, Comte de Sancerre and Captain Eustache de Bimont, Lord of Lalande, who between them commanded the French troops defending the town, and the engineer Girolamo Marini, who built the bastions around the town.
