= Pierre-Antoine Lebrun =

French poet (1785–1873)

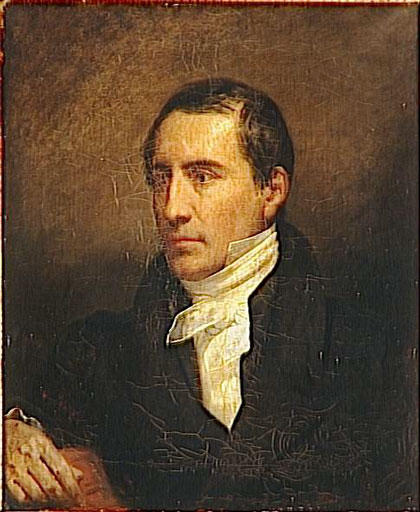
Pierre-Antoine Lebrun in a painting from the 2nd quarter of the 19th century by Ary Scheffer currently at the Musée de l'Histoire de France (Versailles)

Pierre-Antoine Lebrun (French pronunciation: [pjɛʁ ɑ̃twan ləbʁœ̃]; 29 November 1785 – 27 May 1873) was a French poet.

== Biography ==
Lebrun was born in Paris. An Ode à la grande armée, mistaken at the time for the work of Écouchard Lebrun, attracted Napoleon's attention, and secured for the author a pension of 1,200 francs. Lebrun's plays, once famous, are now forgotten. They are: Ulysse (1814), Marie Stuart (1820), which obtained a great success, and Le Cid d'Andalousie (1825).

Lebrun visited Greece in 1820, and on his return to Paris he published in 1822 an ode on the death of Napoleon, which cost him his pension. In 1825 he was the guest of Sir Walter Scott at Abbotsford. The coronation of Charles X in that year inspired the verses entitled La Vallée de Champrosay, which have, perhaps, done more to secure his fame than his more ambitious attempts.

In 1828 appeared his most important poem, Le Voyage en Grèce, and in the same year he was elected to the Academy. The revolution of 1830 opened up a public career for him; in 1831 he was made director of the Imprimerie Royale, and subsequently filled other public offices with distinction, becoming a senator in 1853.

== Bibliography ==
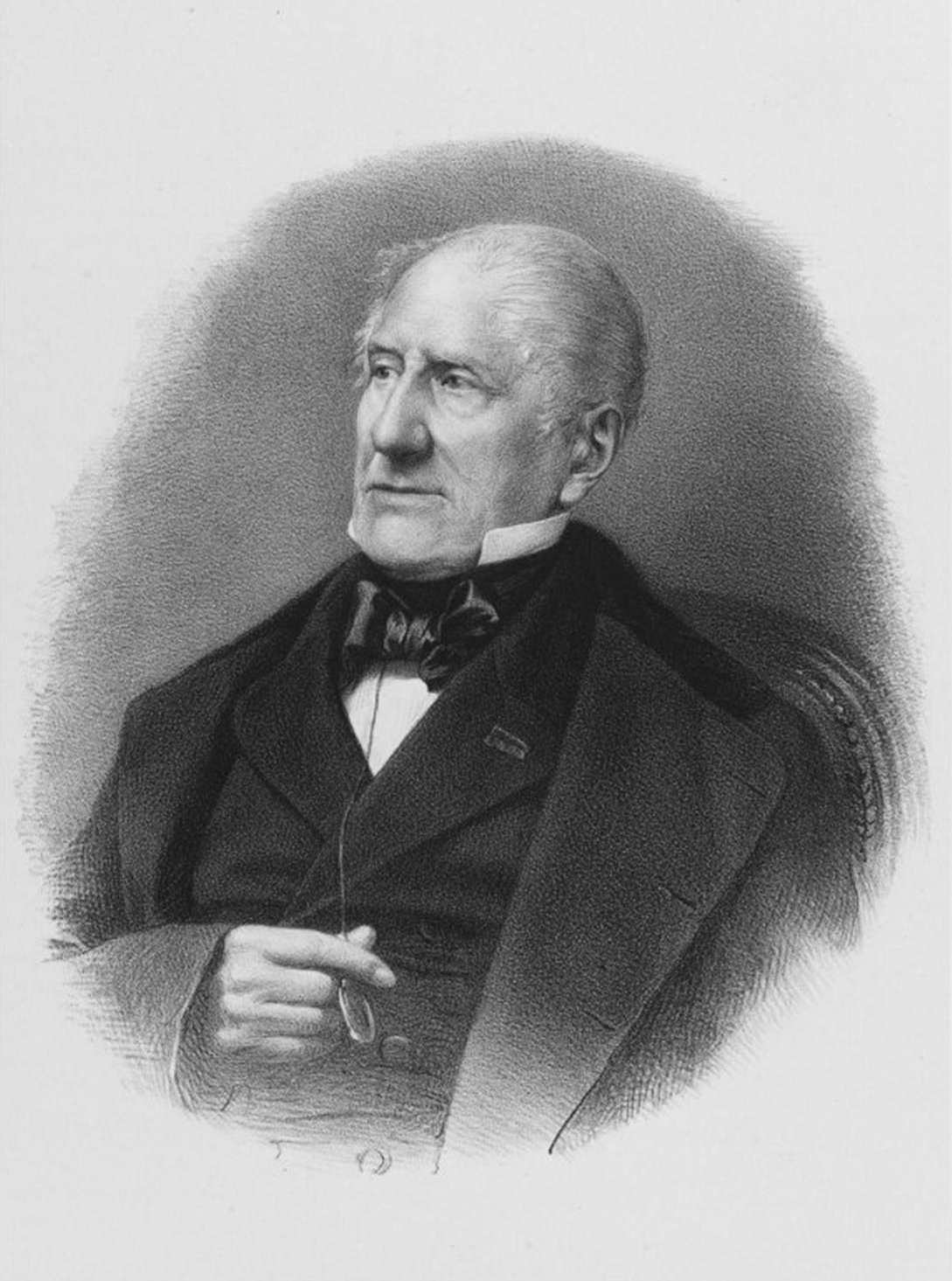
An older Pierre-Antoine Lebrun.

=== Poetry ===
- Ode à la Grande Armée (1805)
- La Vallée de Champrosay (1825)
- Le Voyage en Grèce (1828)

=== Theatre ===
- Pallas, fils d'Évandre, tragédie (1806)
- Ulysse, tragédie en 5 actes, Paris, Théâtre Français, 28 April 1814.
- Marie Stuart, tragédie en 5 actes, d'après Frédéric Schiller, avec Mademoiselle Duchesnois, Paris, Comédie-Française, 6 mars 1820.
- Le Cid d'Andalousie, tragédie en cinq actes, Paris, Comédie-Française, 1 March 1825.
