= Christian Janot =

French physicist and materials scientist (1936–2022)

- Born: January 4, 1936; Saint-Dizier, France
- Died: February 23, 2022 (aged 86); La Buisse, France
- Education: University of Dijon; University of Nancy
- Scientific career
- Institutions: University of Lorraine; Institut Laue Langevin; University of Grenoble
- Doctoral advisor: Armand Hadni

Christian Alfred Elie Janot (January 4, 1936 – February 23, 2022) was a French physicist and materials scientist known for his work on materials characterization using Mössbauer spectroscopy and his physical metallurgy studies of quasicrystals and noncrystalline materials using neutron scattering techniques.

== Education and career ==
Janot studied physics and mathematics at the University of Dijon and later joined Armand Hadni at University of Nancy, where he received his PhD in 1963. Janot was one of the founding directors of the Jean Lamour Institute, a joint research institute between CNRS and the University of Lorraine. Between 1982 and 1991, Janot was appointed senior scientist at Institut Laue Langevin in Grenoble, France, and retained a long-term visitor position afterwards. During this period, Janot also became a professor at Joseph Fourier University (later part of Grenoble Alpes University).

Janot cowrote several textbooks in physics and materials science. Nobel Laureate Dan Shechtman wrote a foreword for his classic monograph on quasicrystals.

== Honors and awards ==
Janot was a French Government Overseas Fellow in 1981 at Churchill College, University of Cambridge. He was also a visiting professor at Sapienza University of Rome.

== Bibliography ==
- Gerl, Maurice; Janot, Christian (1970). Relativité, électromagnétisme (in French). Paris: Hachette. OCLC 28128109.
- Gerl, Maurice; Janot, Christian (1970). Thermodynamique et physique statistique (in French). Paris: Hachette. OCLC 463509560.
- Gerl, Maurice; Janot, Christian (1970). Caractère quantique, matière et rayonnement (in French). Paris: Hachette. OCLC 463509558.
- Janot, Christian, Janot, Christian (1972). L'effet Mössbauer et ses applications a la physique du solide et a la metallurgie physique (in French). Paris: Masson. OCLC 635790647.
- Janot, C.; Petry, W.; Richter, Dieter; Springer, T. (1986). Atomic Transport and Defects in Metals by Neutron Scattering : Proceedings of an IFF-ILL Workshop Jülich, Fed. Rep. of Germany, October 2-4, 1985. Berlin, Heidelberg: Springer Berlin Heidelberg. ISBN 978-3-642-71007-0. OCLC 851833203.
- Janot, C; Dubois, J. M; Institut Laue-Langevin; Committee for the Development in Europe of Science and Technology, eds. (1988). Quasicrystalline materials: proceedings of the I.L.L./CODEST workshop, Grenoble, 21-25 March 1988. Singapore; Teaneck, NJ: World Scientific. ISBN 978-9971-5-0631-5. OCLC 18678944.
- Janot, C. (1994), "Quasicrystals", in Baruchel, José; Hodeau, Jean-Louis; Lehmann, Mogens S.; Regnard, Jean-René (eds.), Neutron and Synchrotron Radiation for Condensed Matter Studies, Berlin, Heidelberg: Springer Berlin Heidelberg, pp. 197–211, doi:10.1007/978-3-662-22223-2_9, ISBN 978-3-540-57691-4
- Duneau, Michel; Janot, C (1996). La magie des matériaux (in French). Paris: Editions O. Jacob. ISBN 978-2-7381-0346-8. OCLC 301557375.
- Janot, C; Dubois, Jean-Marie (1998). Les Quasicristaux : matière à paradoxes (in French). Les Ulis (France): EDP Sciences. ISBN 978-2-7598-0245-6. OCLC 232691297.
- Janot, Christian; Ilschner, Bernhard (2001). Matériaux émergents (in French). Lausanne: Presses polytechniques et universitaires romandes. ISBN 978-2-88074-455-7. OCLC 492135783.
- Janot, Christian; Dubois, Jean-Marie (2002), "Quasicrystals as Hierarchical Packing of Overlapping Clusters", in Suck, Jens-Boie; Schreiber, Michael; Häussler, Peter (eds.), Quasicrystals, vol. 55, Berlin, Heidelberg: Springer Berlin Heidelberg, pp. 183–198, doi:10.1007/978-3-662-05028-6_8, ISBN 978-3-642-08390-7
- Janot, Christian (2012). Quasicrystals : a primer (2nd ed.). Oxford: Clarendon Press. ISBN 978-0-19-102179-4. OCLC 893707553.
