= Gaspare Spontini =

Italian composer and conductor

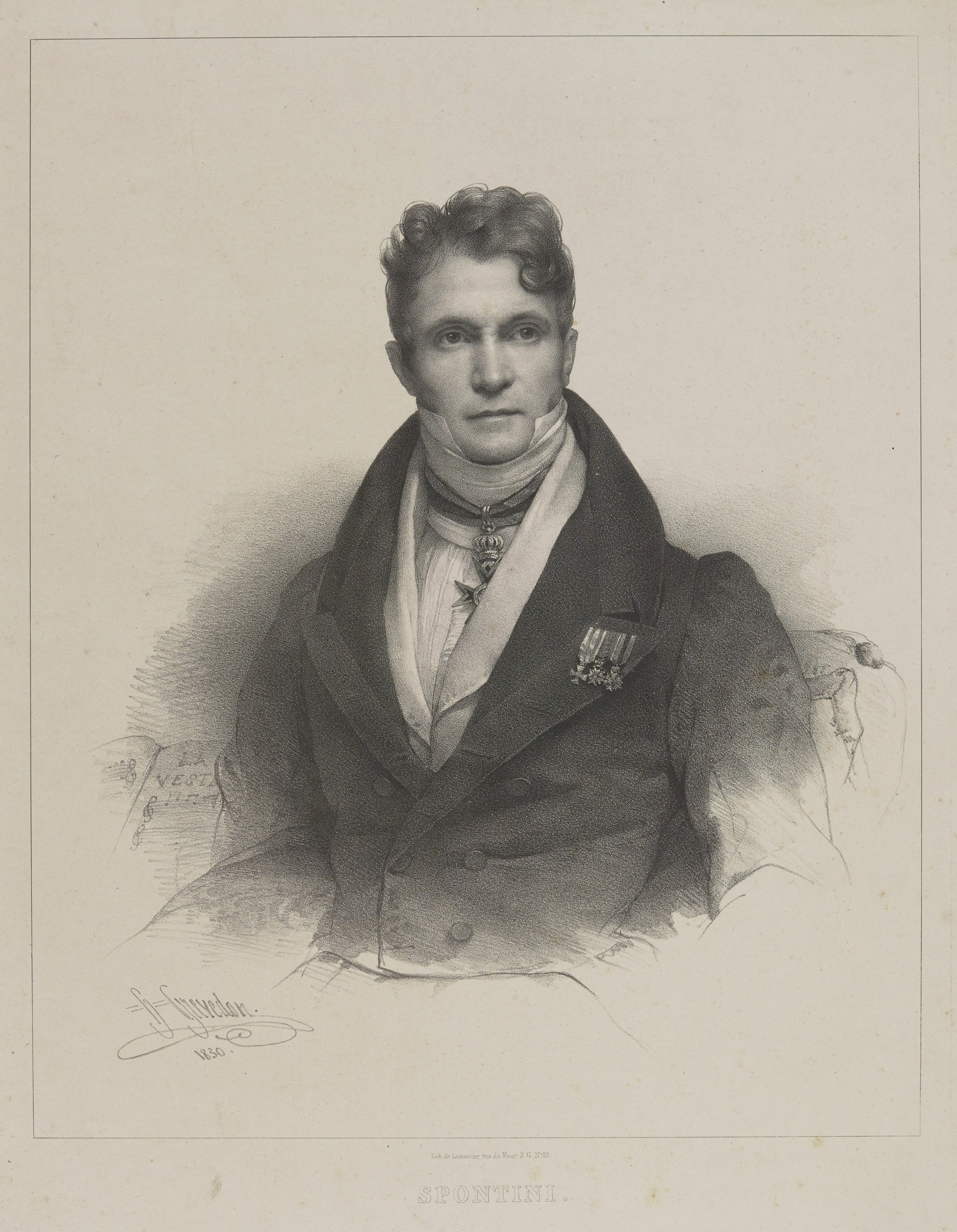
- Born: 14 November 1774; Maiolati, Papal State
- Died: 24 January 1851 (aged 76); Maiolati, Papal State
- Occupations: Composer; Conductor
- Works: List of operas

Gaspare Luigi Pacifico Spontini (14 November 1774 – 24 January 1851) was an Italian opera composer and conductor from the late Classical and early Romantic eras. During the first two decades of the 19th century, Spontini was an important figure in French opera, and he composed over twenty works.

== Biography ==
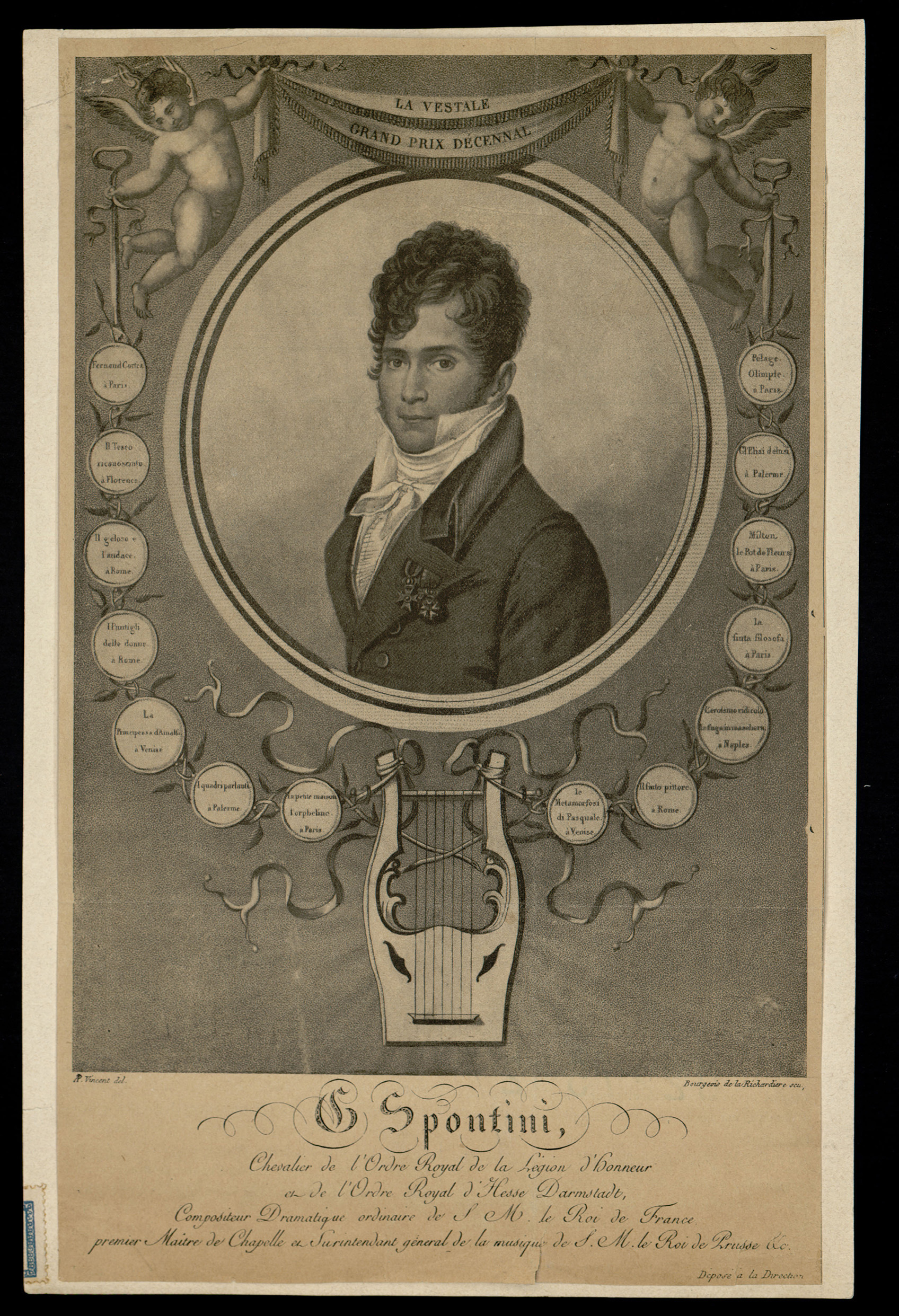
Portrait of Gaspare Spontini, composer (1774-1851)

Born in Maiolati, Papal State (now Maiolati Spontini, Province of Ancona), he spent most of his career in Paris and Berlin, but returned to his place of birth at the end of his life. During the first two decades of the 19th century, Spontini was an important figure in French opera. In his more than twenty operas, Spontini strove to adapt Gluck's classical tragédie lyrique to the contemporary taste for melodrama, for grander spectacle (in Fernand Cortez for example), for enriched orchestral timbre, and for melodic invention allied to idiomatic expressiveness of words.

As a youth, Spontini studied at the Conservatorio della Pietà de' Turchini, one of four active music conservatories of Naples. Working his way from Italian city to city, he got his first break in Rome, with his successful comedy Li Puntigli delle Donne (Carnival 1793). In 1803, he went to Paris, where, on 11 February 1804, debuted his comic opera La Finta Filosofa, his Neapolitan success of 1799. In part on the recommendation of the comte de Rémusat and his literary countess, a dame du palais, Spontini circulated in the Imperial court, was made a member of the Académie Impériale de Musique and gained a court position as compositeur particulier de la chambre of the Empress in 1805.

Though Spontini's earlier successes were comedies, with the encouragement of Empress Joséphine in 1807, Spontini wrote his greatest success, the tragédie lyrique La Vestale, which has remained his best-known work. Its premiere at the Opéra in Paris established Spontini as one of the greatest Italian composers of his age. His contemporaries Cherubini, Beethoven, Weber, Rossini, Donizetti and Meyerbeer all considered it a masterpiece, and later composers such as Berlioz, Verdi, and Wagner admired it.

During the Peninsular War, Napoleon promoted works such as Gasparo Spontini's Fernand Cortez (1809), which concerned the Spanish conquest of Mexico under the reign of Charles V. In 1811, Spontini married Celeste Érard, the niece of the Parisian maker of pianos and harps Sébastien Érard; it was a happy marriage, though childless. He was made a chevalier of Napoleon's Legion of Honor; its Maltese cross hangs round his neck in the portrait by Nicolas-Eustache Maurin (illustration).

Under the changed political climate of the Bourbon Restoration, Spontini, closely identified with the former Empire, saw his opera Olimpie (1819, revised 1821, 1826) meet with indifference, leading him to leave Paris for Berlin, where his operas had already achieved success. There he became Kapellmeister and chief conductor at the Königliches Opernhaus, and in this period he composed the Prussian National Anthem "Borussia". There he also met the young Mendelssohn, but deprecated the 17-year old's opera Die Hochzeit des Camacho.

In 1842, a disillusioned Spontini, chagrined at the success of Giacomo Meyerbeer and others in Germany, returned to Italy, where he died in 1851.

== Compositions ==
=== For the opera ===
- Li puntigli delle donne (1796)
- L'eroismo ridicolo (1798)
- Teseo riconosciuto (1798)
- La fuga in maschera (1800)
- Le metamorfosi di Pasquale (1802)
- Milton (1804)
- Julie, ou Le pot de fleurs (1805)
- La vestale (1807)
- Fernand Cortez (1809)
- Olimpie (1819)
- Nurmahal, oder das Rosenfest von Caschmir (1822)
- Agnes von Hohenstaufen (1829)

=== Other compositions ===
- L'eccelsa gara – Cantata, on a text by Luigi Balocchi (1806)
- Tout le monde a tort – Vaudeville (1806)
- Bacchanale des Danaïdes, for Antonio Salieri's Les Danaïdes (1817)
- Borussia – Prussian anthem, on a text by Johann Friedrich Leopold Duncker (1818)
- Tout deuil (1820)
- Lalla Rûkh – Festspiel, on a text by S. H. Spicker, after Thomas Moore (1821)

== Modern revivals ==
During the 20th century, Spontini's operas were only rarely performed, although several had their first revivals in years. Perhaps the most famous modern production was the revival of La vestale with Maria Callas at La Scala at the opening of the 1954 season, to mark the 180th anniversary of the composer's birth. The stage director was famed cinema director Luchino Visconti. That production was also the La Scala debut of tenor Franco Corelli. Callas recorded the arias "Tu che invoco" and "O Nume tutelar" from La vestale in 1955 (as did Rosa Ponselle in 1926). In 1969, conductor Fernando Previtali revived the opera, with soprano Leyla Gencer and baritone Renato Bruson. (An unofficial recording is in circulation.) In 1993, conductor Riccardo Muti recorded it in the original French language with Karen Huffstodt, Denyce Graves, Anthony Michaels-Moore and Dimitri Kavrakos.

Other revivals of Spontini include Agnes von Hohenstaufen in Italian as Agnese di Hohenstaufen at the Maggio Musicale festival in Florence in 1954, starring Franco Corelli and conducted by Vittorio Gui, and in Rome in 1970, with Montserrat Caballé and Antonietta Stella, conducted by Riccardo Muti, both recorded live. Fernand Cortez was revived in 1951, with a young Renata Tebaldi, at the San Carlo in Naples, conducted by Gabriele Santini. The premiere of the integral version of the work took place at the Erfurt (Germany) opera house (2006, Jean-Paul Penin, conductor).

== Sources ==
- Gerhard, Anselm (n.d.). "Spontini, Gaspare", in Grove Music Online, (subscription required), accessed 13 September 2014.
- Silke Leopold (2006), "The Idea of National Opera, c. 1800" in Unity and Diversity in European Culture c. 1800, (Ed.) Tim Blanning and Hagen Schulze New York: Oxford University Press.
- Todd, R. Larry (2003), Mendelssohn, A Life in Music. Oxford: Oxford University Press. ISBN 978-0-19-511043-2.
- Gaspare Spontini (French) [archive] by Patrick Barbier, bleu nuit éditeur, 2017, 176 p. (ISBN 978-2-3588-4067-5)
