= Milton (opera) =

Opera by Gaspare Spontini

- Opéra comique by Gaspare Spontini
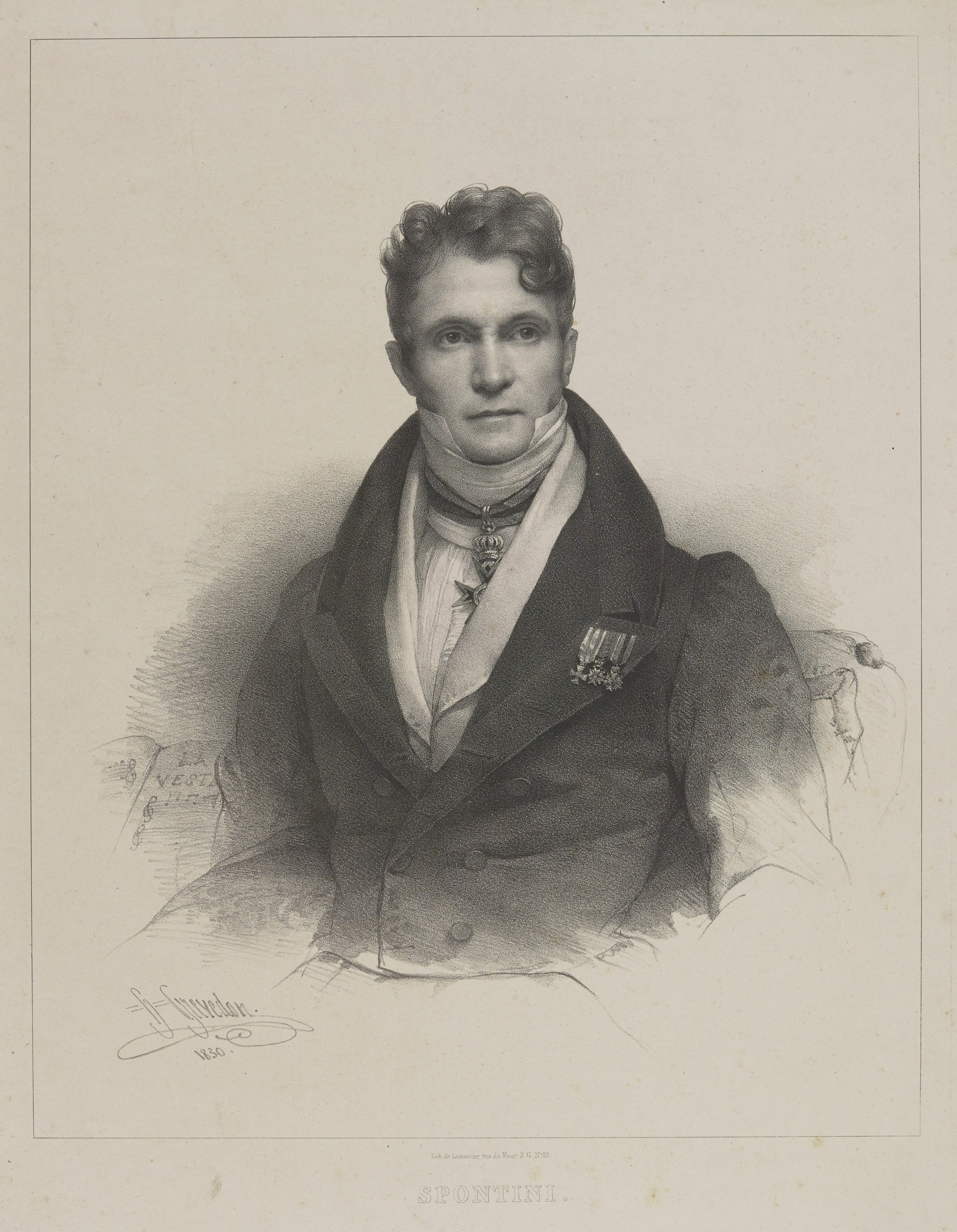
- The composer
- Librettist: Étienne de Jouy; Armand-Michel Dieulafoy
- Language: French
- Based on: life of John Milton
- Premiere: 27 November 1804; Salle Feydeau, Paris

Milton is an opéra comique in one act by Gaspare Spontini. The French libretto, by Victor-Joseph Étienne de Jouy and Armand-Michel Dieulafoy, is based on the life of the English poet John Milton. Milton was first performed on 27 November 1804 by the Opéra-Comique at the Salle Feydeau in Paris. It was Spontini's first major success in France. The composer planned a reworked version for performances in Germany under the title Das verlorene Paradies (Paradise Lost), but in the event it was never staged.

== Roles ==
Roles, voice types, premiere cast
| Role | Voice type | Premiere cast, 27 November 1804 |
|---|---|---|
| Milton, an old man, a poet, blind | baritone | Jean-Pierre Solié |
| Emma, his daughter | soprano | Mme Gavaudan |
| Miss Charlotte, his niece, an old maid | mezzo-soprano | Mme Crétu |
| Lord Arthur Davenant, going under the name Arthur | tenor | Jean-Baptiste-Sauveur Gavaudan |
| Godwin, a Quaker, a Justice of the Peace | bass | Simon Chénard |
| A jockey of Lord Arthur | | |
| A house servant | | |
| People in the livery of the king | | |

== Synopsis ==
The blind poet Milton and his daughter Emma, fearing political persecution by King Charles II, find refuge with the Quaker Godwin. Godwin's niece Charlotte is in love with Milton's secretary, "Arthur". In reality, Arthur is Sir William Davenant, who has adopted this disguise because he is in love with Emma. Milton dictates verses from his poem Paradise Lost to his daughter. In the end, Davenant reveals his true identity and brings Milton a letter from the king promising he will not be punished. Davenant and Emma are now free to marry.

== Sources ==
- Milton: Scores at the International Music Score Library Project
- Original edition of the libretto, 1805
