= Teseo riconosciuto =

1798 opera by Gaspare Spontini

Teseo riconosciuto (1798) is the first opera seria by Gaspare Spontini to a libretto by Cosimo Giotti. It was premiered at the Teatro della Pallacorda of the Accademia degli Intrepidi, Florence, and then at the Teatro Alfieri on Via Pietrapiana.

== Cast ==
- Egeo,
- Teseo,
- Asteria,
- Medea,
- Connida,
- Evandro,
- Leucippe,
- Ombra d'Etra

== Recording ==
Carlo Allemano, Diego D'Auria, Sonia Visentin, Paoletta Marrocu, Stefano Rinaldi, Miliani Carlo Bosi, and Daniela Piccini. Alberto Zedda 1995
