= Julie, ou Le pot de fleurs =

1805 comic opera

Julie, ou Le pot de fleurs is an 1805 comic opera in one act by Gaspare Spontini to a libretto by the metallurgist Antoine-Gabriel Jars (1774–1857).

== Plot ==
Mondors wants to arrange for his ward to marry his friend; she agrees with a heavy heart, but drops a flowerpot out the window to catch the attention of her lover, who is just passing by. However, the pot hits him on the shoulder. He comes upstairs and encounters his lover there in the presence of her future groom. The groom, in turn, claims to be her uncle and questions the two of them. When the uncle actually arrives, the jealous lover initially mistakes him for his rival. In the end, everything is resolved harmoniously.

== Cast ==
- Julie, Mondor's niece (soprano)
- Mondor (bass)
- Verseuil, Mondor's friend (baritone)
- Valcour, a young officer (tenor)
- Champagne, servant (speaking role)

== Performances and recordings ==
- 1968 – in Italian – Valeria Mariconda (Julie), Ugo Trama (Mondor), Giancarlo Montanaro (Verseuil), Amilcare Blaffard (Valcour), Siena Festival. Bruno Rigacci
- 2001 – in French – Caroline Mutel (Julie), Olivier Heyte (Verseuil), Till Fechner (Mondor), Martial Defontaine (Valcour) – Festival Pergolesi-Spontini, Villa Pianetti, Monsano, conducted by Ottavio Dantone.
