= Fernand Cortez =

1809 opera by Gaspare Spontini

- Opera by Gaspare Spontini
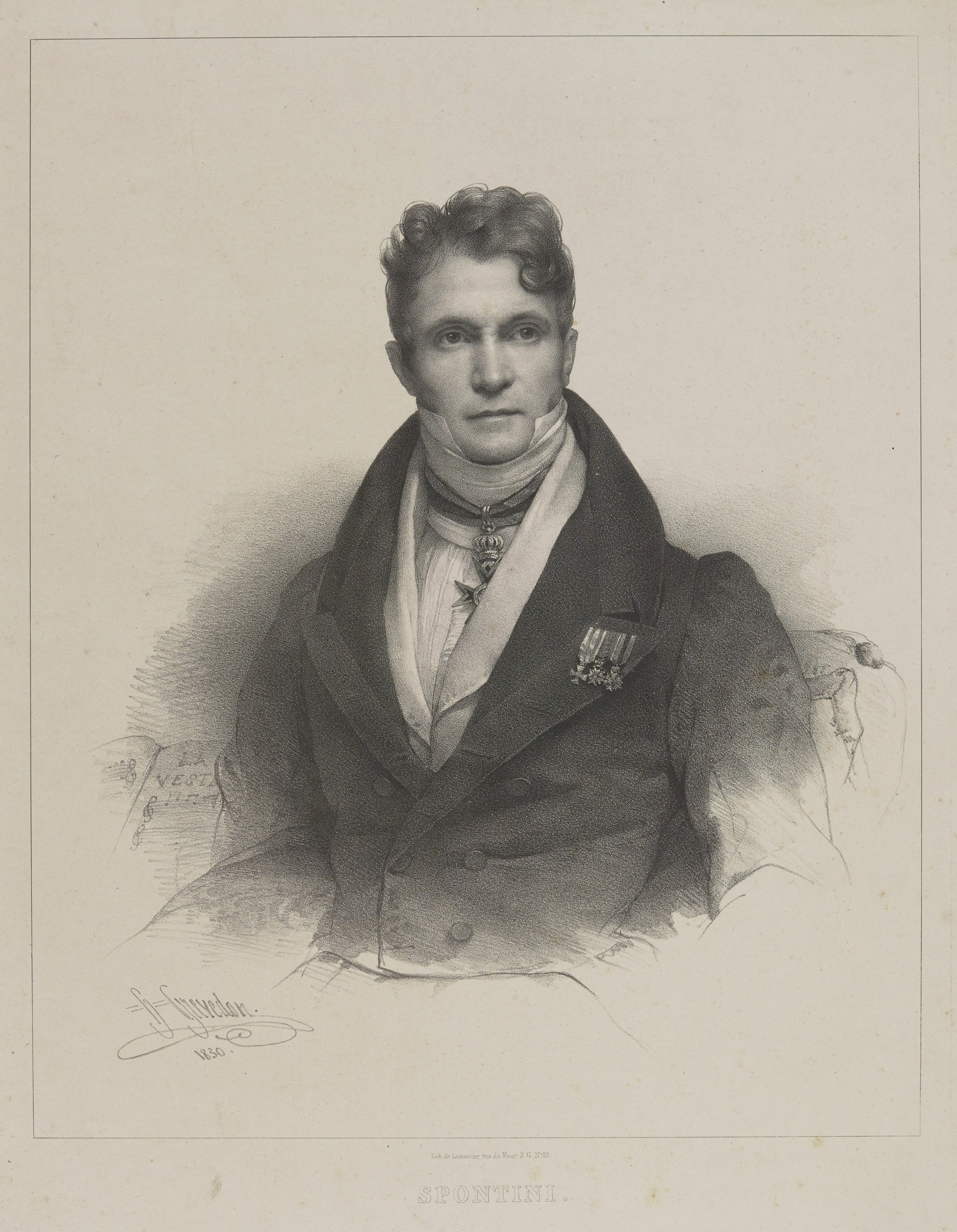
- The composer
- Librettist: Étienne de Jouy; Joseph-Alphonse Esménard
- Language: French
- Based on: Conquest of Mexico
- Premiere: 28 November 1809; Salle Montansier, Paris

Fernand Cortez, ou La conquête du Mexique (Hernán Cortés, or The Conquest of Mexico) is a tragédie en musique in three acts by Gaspare Spontini with a French libretto by Étienne de Jouy and Joseph-Alphonse Esménard. It was first performed on 28 November 1809 by the Académie Impériale de Musique (Paris Opera) at the Salle Montansier.

== Background and performance history ==
The opera was originally intended as political propaganda to support the Emperor Napoleon's invasion of Spain in 1808. Cortez symbolises Napoleon while the bloodthirsty Aztec priests are meant to represent the Spanish Inquisition. The emperor himself is said to have suggested the theme of the opera to Spontini and the premiere was held in his presence. The popularity of the piece declined with the waning of the French army's fortunes in Spain and Portugal.

The 1809 premiere was famous for its spectacular effects, including the appearance of 17 live horses on stage. Critics complained about the adventurous harmony and the loudness of the music. The richness of the staging, extensive use of dance and the treatment of an historical subject make Spontini's work the precursor of French Grand Opera. It was greatly admired by Hector Berlioz.

Spontini substantially revised twice the opera for revivals in Paris on 28 May 1817. Revisions were also made for performances in Berlin in 1824 (recorded by Jean-Paul Penin in 1999) and 1832, and later in Paris in 1838, last version of the work. Performances in Paris at Saint-Louis des Invalides, with the sponsorship of the Fondation Napoléon, in Madrid (Auditorio Nacional), Oviedo and Sevilla, 2003, with the Prag Radio Philharmonic, then at the Theater Erfurt in 2006, all series conducted by Penin.

== Roles ==
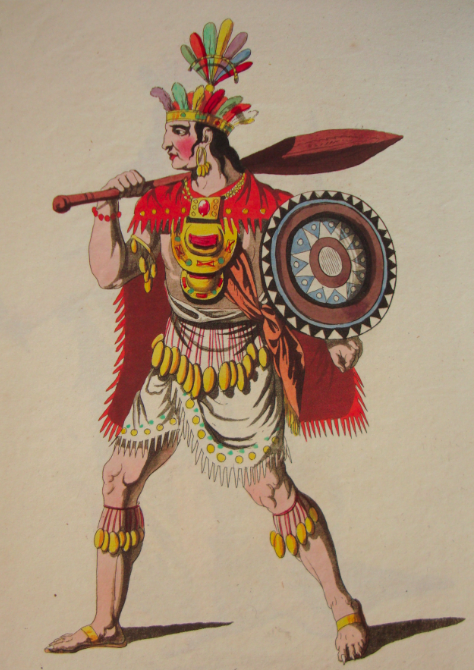
Johann Michael Vogl as Télasco, Theater am Kärntnertor, 1812

Roles, voice types, premiere cast
Role	Voice type	Premiere cast, 28 November 1809
Fernand Cortez	taille (baritenor)	Étienne Lainez
Télasco	taille	François Lays
Alvar	haute-contre	Laforêt
High priest	bass	Henri-Étienne Dérivis
Moralèz	bass	Jean-Honoré Bertin
Two Spanish officers	taille/bass	Louis Nourrit, Albert
A Mexican officer	taille	Martin
Amazily	soprano	Alexandrine-Caroline Branchu
Ladies companions of Amazily	sopranos	Lacombe, Reine
Coryphaei	taille/bass	Martin, Picard

== Synopsis ==
This is based on the original version of 1809.

=== Act 1 ===
The opera is based on the story of the Spanish conquistador, Hernán Cortés, and his invasion of Aztec Mexico. At the beginning of the opera, Cortez persuades his mutinous troops not to embark for home. His brother, Alvaro, is a prisoner of the Aztecs and Cortez is also in love with the Aztec princess, Amazily. Amazily's brother, Télasco, arrives and tells the Spaniards to leave Mexico. Cortez responds by setting fire to his own ships.

=== Act 2 ===
The Spaniards advance on the Aztec temple with Télasco their prisoner. They succeed in freeing Alvaro. Télasco accuses his sister Amazily of being a traitor and the Aztecs threaten to behead her if Alvaro is not returned to them. Amazily decides to sacrifice herself and hands herself over to the Aztecs. Cortez orders his men to attack the temple.

=== Act 3 ===
In the temple, the priests prepare to sacrifice Alvaro when Amazily arrives. An oracle from the god announces that he wants the blood of his enemies. News arrives that the Aztec emperor Montezuma has been captured by the Spaniards. The high priest decides to go ahead with the sacrifice of Amazily. The Spaniards arrive just in time to save her. Amazily and Cortez are united in marriage.

== Recordings ==
- (1817 version) Soloists, Slovak National Philharmonic Choir, Slovak National Philharmonic Orchestra conducted by Jean-Paul Penin (Accord, 1999)
- With Dario Schmunck, Alexia Voulgaridou, Luca Lombardo, Gianluca Margheri, André Courville, David Ferri Durà, Orchestra and chorus of the Maggio Musicale Fiorentino conducted by Jean-Luc Tingaud. CD: Dynamic Cat:CDS7868. Released 2020.
