= Le metamorfosi di Pasquale =

Opera by Gaspare Spontini

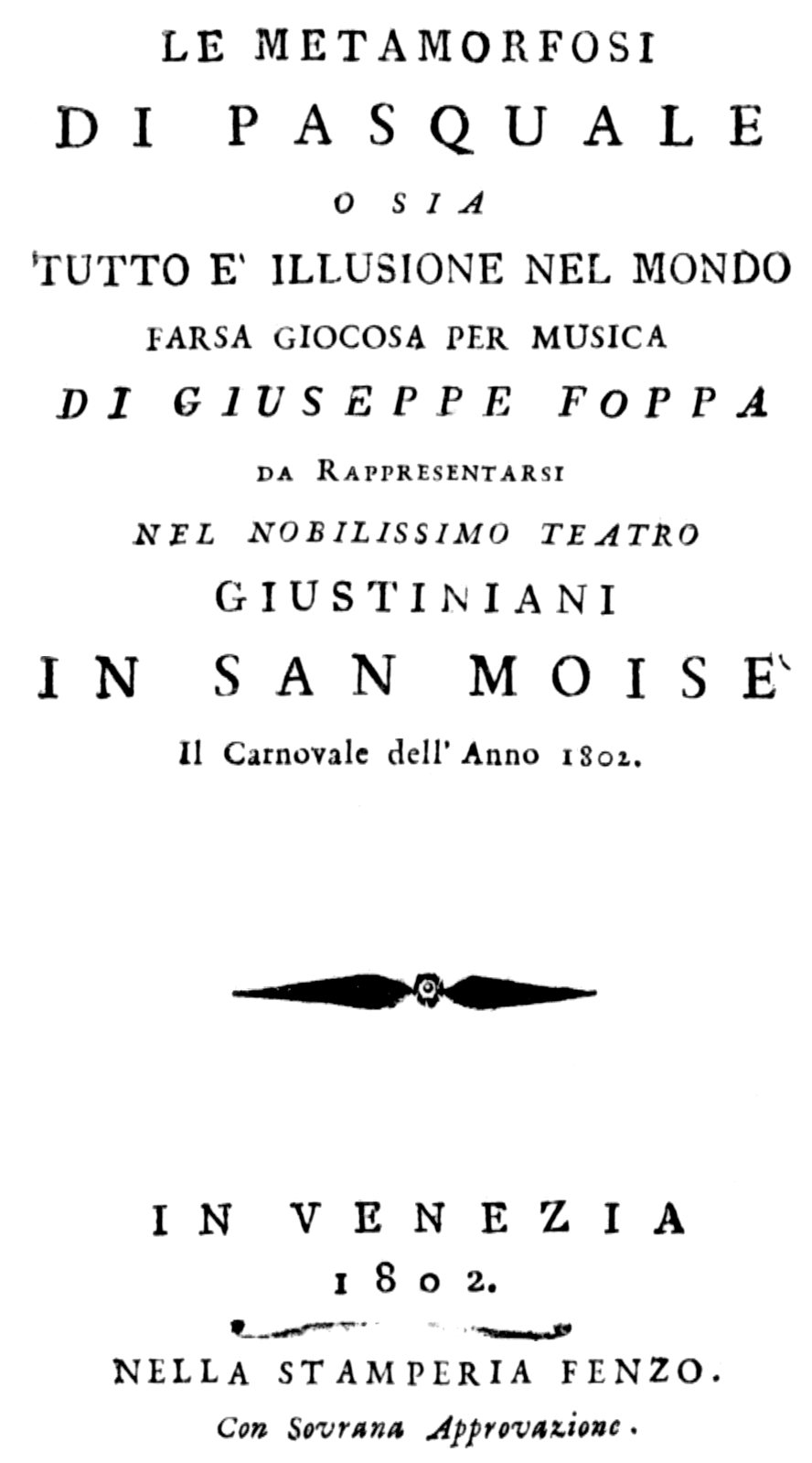
Le metamorfosi di Pasquale - title page of the libretto, Venice 1802

Le metamorfosi di Pasquale, o sia Tutto è illusione nel mondo is a one-act farsa opera by Gaspare Spontini on a libretto by Giuseppe Foppa, which premiered at the Teatro San Moisè, Venice in 1802. The opera was Spontini's last work for Italy before his move to Paris and then Berlin. The opera was considered lost but rediscovered in the collection of the Duke of Ursel in Belgium in 2016.

== Recording ==
Spontini: Le Metamorfosi di Pasquale; Baurzhan Anderzhanov (Pasquale), Carolina Lippo (Lisetta), Davide Bartolucci (Frontino), Antonio Garés (Il Marchese), Michela Antenucci (Costanza), Carlo Feola (Barone), Daniele Adriani (Il Cavaliere/Un Sergente); Orchestra Sinfonica G. Rossini, Giuseppe Montesano Dynamic 2019
