= Ein Hoga =

Coordinates: 32°31′4.07″N 35°32′14.88″E

Ein Hoga (Hebrew: עין חוגה) (Arabic: عين السوداء) is a spring situated 4 km (2 mi) north-east of Bet She'an, and to the east of the Kibbutz at Hamadia. It is one of the most important sources of water in the Bet She'an valley.

To the east of the spring there are the remains of a Neolithic village.

Near the place was a Palestinians village named Al-Hamidiyya in what is today the kibbutz of Hamadia.
