= Li puntigli delle donne =

Li puntigli delle donne is a 1796 opera, a farsetta for six voices, by Gaspare Spontini first performed at Teatro della Pallacorda of the Accademia degli Intrepidi, Florence.

== Cast ==
- Giannina, Daughter of a rich country farmer intende to be the count's bride (mezzo soprano)
- Doctor Mangiacarte, elder brother of the count (bass)
- Count Brontolone, intended bridegroom of Giannina (baritone)
- Valerio, son of the count and husband of Countess Rosimene (tenor)
- Countess Rosimene, wife of Valerio (soprano)
- Cavalier del Ciufolo, protector of Giannina (tenor)
- Lisetta, Countess Rosimene's maid (soprano)

2 flute, 2 oboes, 2 horns, strings, b.c.

== Recordings ==
- The opera was revived in June 1998 at the Putbus Festival under Wilhelm Keitel and the recording issued on Arte Nova.
- Another recording with Ernesto Palacio, Gianpiero Ruggeri, Susanna Rigacci, Alessandra Ruffini, conducted Alberto Zedda Dynamic 1999
