= La fuga in maschera =

La fuga in maschera is a comic opera by Gaspare Spontini premiered in the Carnival season in Naples in 1800 at the Teatro Nuovo. The work was thought lost but found in 2007 and given its modern premiere at Jesi’s Teatro Pergolesi in 2012. The opera is scored for 2 oboes, 1 clarinet, 1 bassoon, 2 horns, strings and basso continuo.

== Roles ==
- Elena, daughter of Marzucco, betrothed to Doctor Filebo – Soprano
- Olimpia, Elena's cousin, who lives in the same House, a spiritual woman with lofty ideas – Soprano
- Coralline, a vagabond girl, betrayed in love by Doralbo – Soprano
- Nardullo, clever peasant, and gracious brother of Coralline – Bass
- Marzocco, fanatical painter – Bass
- Nastagio, Servant of Marzucco – Bass
- Doralbo, charlatan, known as Doctor Filebo – tenor

== Recording ==
- La fuga in maschera, DVD; Elena – Ruth Rosique, Olimpia – Caterina Di Tonno; Corallina – Alessandra Marianelli; Nardullo – Clemente Daliotti; Marzucco – Filippo Morace; Nastagio – Alessandro Spina; Doralbo – Dionigi D’Ostuni. I Virtuosi Italiani, Conductor – Corrado Rovaris, Production – Leo Muscato. Euro-Arts 2012, issued 2014
