= La Quotidienne =

La Quotidienne (French pronunciation: [la kɔtidjɛn]) was a French Royalist newspaper.

== History ==
It was set up in 1790 by M. de Coutouly. It ceased publication in the face of events in 1792, before returning to print in July 1794 under the title Le Tableau de Paris, returning to its original title in 1817.

In 1817, Joseph-François Michaud became its chief editor, holding the post until his death in 1839. In February 1847, it merged with La France and L'Écho français to create L'Union monarchique (renamed L'Union in 1848). Pierre-Sébastien Laurentie took over its editorship and turned it into an Ultra-Royalist publication. In it Lamartine published his letter Opinion du citoyen Lamartine sur le Communisme. Also, on 27 October 1873, it published the open letter to Pierre Charles Chesnelong by which the Comte de Chambord reiterated his attachment to the royalist white flag and refused all compromise.

== Contributors ==
- Balzac published in L'Union monarchique, from 7 April to 3 May 1847, his unfinished novel Le Député d'Arcis. He also published his second communiqué (the first she saw) to his future wife, Eveline Hańska, in La Quotidienne.
- Joseph-Alphonse Esménard,
- Joseph-Arthur de Gobineau published regularly from 1840 a chronicle of diplomatic affairs. In 1846 he published in the paper a 'roman-feuilleton', Les Aventures de Jean de La Tour-Miracle then Nicolas Belavoir,.
- Charles Nodier
- Pierre-Sébastien Laurentie (1817–1830),
- Jean Joseph François Poujoulat
- Jean-Baptiste Honoré Raymond Capefigue (1801–1872), historian and biographer
