= Nathalie Elma d'Esménard =

French botanical illustrator

Nathalie d'Esménard
- Born: 6 September 1798; Paris
- Died: 25 February 1872 (aged 73); Nice
- Known for: botanical illustrations
- Spouses: Baron Antoine Renaud; Pierre de Ricordy

Nathalie Elma d'Esménard (1798-1872) was a French artist, botanical illustrator, and student of Pierre-Joseph Redouté.

== Biography ==
Nathalie d'Esménard was born in Paris on 6 September 1798 to Joseph-Alphonse Esménard, a French politician and author, and Jeanne-Adolphine de Kalkräber. At age three, her parents had another daughter, Inès Esménard, who would also go on to become a painter, though one who specialized in portrait miniatures. Her father was killed in 1811 while travelling in Italy.

Nathalie would go on to become a student of Pierre-Joseph Redouté, an esteemed botanical illustrator. As a student, she displayed the influence of Redouté in the realm of botanical illustration in her use of detail, color, and design. Her works would be put on exhibition twice in the Parisian salons, in 1822 and 1827, where they were received positively.

Nathalie married Baron Antoine Renaud, a field marshal and recipient of the Legion of Honour, and several of her paintings were signed with her married name of "Renaud". However, Baron Renaud died and left Nathalie a widow. On 25 February 1843 she remarried to a man named Pierre de Ricordy from a patrician family in Nice. She died in Nice on 15 December 1872 at the age of 74.

== Art ==
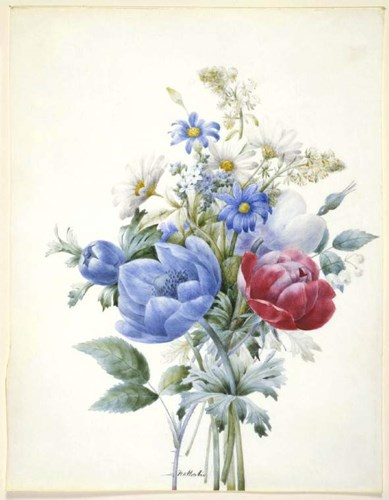
A rose, anemone, mignonette and daisies painted in 1824

Nathalie primarily painted botanical depictions of flowers and other flora. She used mainly watercolor, but also oil, on canvas and vellum.

=== Selected works ===
The following are several paintings by Nathalie d'Esménard:

- Noisette Rose: 1823, copy of Redouté's Rose le Philipp Noisette
- Narcissi and pansies: 1823
- A rose, anemone, mignonette and daisies: 1824
- Camellia japonica (Camellia): 1826
- A spray of violas and primulas
- A spray including single roses, violas and cineraria
