= Nurmahal (opera) =

German-language opera by Gaspare Spontini

Nurmahal, oder Das Rosenfest von Kaschmir is an 1822 German-language opera in two acts by Gaspare Spontini, to a libretto by Carl Alexander Herklots after Thomas Moore's Lalla Rookh premiered in Berlin.
