= Joséphine Duchesnois =

French actress

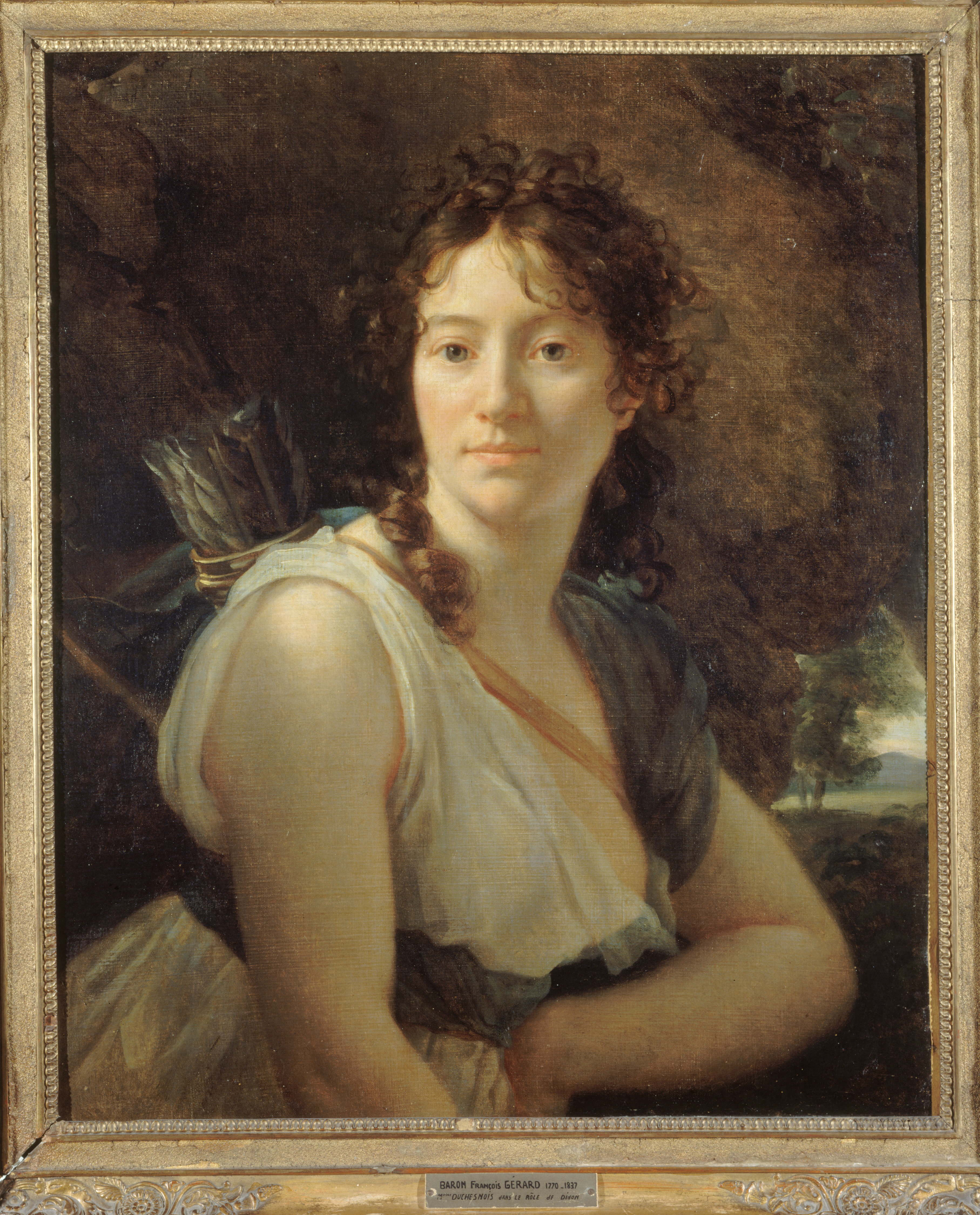
- Duchesnois in the role of Dido, by François Gérard
- Born: Catherine-Joséphine Rafin; 7 June 1777; Paris
- Died: 8 February 1835 (aged 57)
- Occupation: actor
- Years active: 1797 - 1833

Catherine-Joséphine Duchesnois, née Rafin, often simply called Mademoiselle Duchesnois, (1777–1835) was a classical French actress who performed at the Comédie-Française. She was also one of Napoleon's mistresses.

== Early life ==
Born on 5 June 1777 at Saint-Saulve near Valenciennes, Duchesnois was the daughter of an innkeeper. After working for a time as a maidservant and a seamstress, she first appeared in Valenciennes at an amateur production in January 1797. Following her apparently successful debut, she went to Paris to take drama courses under a Mademoiselle Florence. Despite her plain looks, she was picked out by Madame de Montesson who managed to have her trialled by the Théâtre-Français for a period of five months.

== Career ==
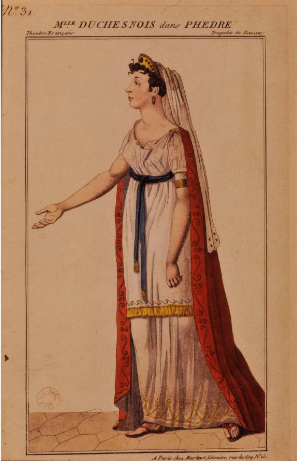
Duschesnois as Phèdre (1802)

Her Paris début was on 3 August 1802 in Racine's Phèdre. Her acting was so outstanding that Napoleon Bonaparte came to see her perform a few days later. She gained the respect of François-Joseph Talma, a leading actor at the Comédie-Française, quickly becoming his stage partner. Thanks to her warmth, her passion and her strong expressive voice, she was also acclaimed by her audiences. By November, they had become so enthusiastic that they insisted she should be crowned on stage by the other actors.

Duchesnois became one of Napoleon's many mistresses, rivalling fellow actress Mademoiselle George who had also succeeded in attracting his favours. At the theatre, George became a rival too, with her good looks and studied delivery. While Duchesnois had a natural, spontaneous style, George was far more formal, practising the classical approach. The rivalry grew to be so intense that Count Remusat, the Comédie's director, was forced to elevate both women to the status of sociétaire the same day. The situation was not resolved until Mademoiselle George left for Austria and later Russia in 1808. From 1804 to 1829, Duchesnois performed in 36 different roles.

== Death and burial ==
Joséphine Duchesnois retired from the stage on 9 January 1833 when she was 55. She died in Paris two years later on 8 February 1835 and is buried in the Père Lachaise Cemetery. Her monument there was erected following contributions from the Royal Family, the Comédie-Française, the City of Paris and several other French cities.
