= Prussian anthem =

Prussian anthem or anthem of Prussia can refer to:

- "Borussia" – the national anthem of Prussian from 1820 to 1830
- "Preußenlied" – the national anthem of Prussia from 1830 to 1840
- "Heil dir im Siegerkranz" – the royal anthem of Prussia from 1795 to 1918
