= Prussia =

German state from 1525 to 1947

Prussia Preußen (German)
- 1525–1947 (Note: Monarchy abolished in 1918, abolished as a state of Germany in 1947)
- State flag (1803–1892) Coat of arms (1701–1871)
- Motto: Gott mit uns Nobiscum Deus ("God with us")
- Anthem: (1820–1830); Borussia "Prussia" (1830–1840); Preußenlied "Song of Prussia" Royal anthem: (1795–1918) "Heil dir im Siegerkranz" ("Hail to thee in the Victor's Crown")
- Capital: Königsberg (1525–1701; 1806); Berlin (1701–1806; 1806–1947)
- Common languages: Official: German Minorities: Baltic Prussian (until early 18th century); Low German; Polish; Danish; Frisian; Swedish; Lithuanian; Lower Sorbian; Kursenieki; Kashubian; Wymysorys; Slovincian (until 20th century)
- Religion: Religious confessions in the Kingdom of Prussia 1880; Majority: 64.6% United Protestant (Lutheran, Calvinist); Minorities: 33.8% Catholic; 1.3% Jewish; 0.2% other Christian; 0.1% other
- Demonym: Prussian
- Government: Feudal monarchy (1525–1701) Absolute monarchy (1701–1848) Federal parliamentary semi-constitutional monarchy (1848–1918) Federal semi-presidential constitutional republic (1918–1932) Presidential republic under authoritarian rule by decree (1932–1933) Unitary fascist state (1933–1945) Allied-occupied Germany (1945–1947)
- Duke^{[a]}
  - 1525–1568: Albert I (first)
  - 1688–1701: Frederick I (last)
- King^{[a]}
  - 1701–1713: Frederick I (first)
  - 1888–1918: Wilhelm II (last)
- Minister President^{[a]}^{[b]}
  - 1918: Friedrich Ebert (first)
  - 1933–1945: Hermann Göring (last)
- Historical era: Early modern Europe to Contemporary
  - Duchy of Prussia: 10 April 1525
  - Union with Brandenburg: 27 August 1618
  - Kingdom of Prussia: 18 January 1701
  - Free State of Prussia: 9 November 1918
  - Abolition (de facto, loss of independence): 30 January 1934
  - Abolition (de jure): 25 February 1947 (Note: Monarchy abolished in 1918, abolished as a state of Germany in 1947)

Population
  - 1816: 10,349,000
  - 1871: 24,689,000
  - 1939: 41,915,040
- Currency: Reichsthaler (until 1750); Prussian thaler (1750–1857); Vereinsthaler (1857–1873); German gold mark (1873–1914); German Papiermark (1914–1923); Reichsmark (1924–1947)
- 1. The heads of state listed here are the first and last to hold each title over time. For more information, see individual Prussian state articles (links in above History section).; 2. The position of Ministerpräsident was introduced in 1792 when Prussia was a Kingdom; the minister presidents shown here are the heads of the Prussian republic.

Prussia (/ˈprʌʃə/; German: Preußen [ˈpʁɔʏsn̩]) was a German state centred on the North European Plain. It originated from the 1525 secularization act of the Prussian part of the State of the Teutonic Order. For centuries, the House of Hohenzollern ruled Prussia, expanding its size with the Prussian Army. Prussia, with its capital at Königsberg and then, when it became the Kingdom of Prussia in 1701, Berlin, decisively shaped the history of Germany. Prussia formed the German Empire when it united the German states in 1871. It was de facto dissolved by an emergency decree transferring powers of the Prussian government to German chancellor Franz von Papen in 1932 and de jure by an Allied decree in 1947.

The name Prussia derives from the Old Prussians who were conquered by the Teutonic Knights – an organized Catholic medieval military order of German crusaders – in the 13th century. In 1308, the Teutonic Knights conquered the region of Pomerelia with Danzig. Their monastic state was mostly Germanised through immigration from central and western Germany, and, in the south, it was Polonised by settlers from Masovia. The imposed Second Peace of Thorn (1466) split Prussia into the western Royal Prussia, a province of Poland, and the eastern Duchy of Prussia, a feudal fief of the Crown of Poland until 1657. After 1525, the Teutonic Order relocated their headquarters to Mergentheim, but managed to keep land in Livonia until 1561. The union of Brandenburg and the Duchy of Prussia in 1618 led to the proclamation of the Kingdom of Prussia in 1701.

Prussia entered the ranks of the great powers shortly after becoming a kingdom. It became increasingly large and powerful in the 18th and 19th centuries. It had a major voice in European affairs under the reign of Frederick the Great (1740–1786). At the Congress of Vienna (1814–15), which redrew the map of Europe following Napoleon's defeat, Prussia acquired rich new territories, including the coal-rich Ruhr. The country then grew rapidly in influence economically and politically, and became the core of the North German Confederation in 1867, and then of the German Empire in 1871. The Kingdom of Prussia was now so large and so dominant in the new Germany that Junkers and other Prussian elites identified more and more as Germans and less as Prussians.

The Kingdom ended in 1918 along with other German monarchies that were terminated by the German Revolution. In the Weimar Republic, the Free State of Prussia lost nearly all of its legal and political importance following the 1932 coup led by Franz von Papen. Subsequently, it was effectively dismantled into Nazi German Gaue in 1935. Nevertheless, some Prussian ministries were kept and Hermann Göring remained in his role as Minister President of Prussia until the end of World War II. Former eastern territories of Germany that made up a significant part of Prussia lost the majority of their German population after 1945 as the Polish People's Republic and the Soviet Union both absorbed these territories and had most of its German inhabitants expelled by 1950. Prussia, deemed "a bearer of militarism and reaction" by the Allies, was officially abolished by an Allied declaration in 1947. The international status of the former eastern territories of the Kingdom of Prussia was disputed until the Treaty on the Final Settlement with Respect to Germany in 1990, but its return to Germany remains a cause among far-right politicians, the Federation of Expellees and various political revanchists and irredentists.

The terms "Prussian" and "Prussianism" have often been used, especially outside Germany, to denote the militarism, military professionalism, aggressiveness, and conservatism of the Junker class of landed aristocrats in the East who dominated first Prussia and then the German Empire.

== Symbols ==
The central emblems of Prussia were the black eagle and the flag of Prussia, which placed the eagle on a white field. Black and white had long-standing associations in the region. They were used by the Teutonic Knights and later by the Hohenzollern dynasty. The Teutonic Order’s white surcoat, embroidered with a black cross edged in gold and bearing the black imperial eagle, established the colour pairing that became closely tied to Prussian identity.

Black and white were eventually combined with the red-and-white colours of the Hanseatic cities—Bremen, Hamburg and the Lübeck—and with the colours of Brandenburg. This produced the black–white–red commercial flag of the North German Confederation, adopted later as the flag of the German Empire in 1871.

The Latin motto Suum cuique (‘to each, his own’) originated with the Order of the Black Eagle, founded by King Frederick I in 1701, and came to be widely associated with Prussia. The Iron Cross, introduced in 1813 by King Frederick William III, also became a prominent Prussian symbol.

The region, first settled by Baltic Old Prussians who were later Christianised, became a destination for migrants over several centuries, including (and later mainly) Protestant Germans as well as Masurians and Prussian Lithuanians living near the borderlands (See Ostsiedlung.)

== Territory ==
Before its abolition, the territory of the Free State of Prussia included the provinces of East Prussia; Brandenburg; Saxony (including much of the present-day state of Saxony-Anhalt and parts of the state of Thuringia in Germany); Pomerania; Rhineland; Westphalia; Silesia (without Austrian Silesia); Schleswig-Holstein; Hanover; Hesse-Nassau; and a small detached area in the south called Hohenzollern, the ancestral home of the Prussian ruling family. The land that the Teutonic Knights occupied was flat and covered with fertile soil. The area was perfectly suited to the large-scale raising of wheat. The rise of early Prussia was based on the raising and selling of wheat. Teutonic Prussia became known as the "bread basket of Western Europe" (in German, Kornkammer, or granary). The port cities which rose on the back of this wheat production included: Stettin in Pomerania (now Szczecin, Poland); Danzig in Prussia (now Gdańsk, Poland); Riga in Livonia (now Riga, Latvia); Königsberg in Prussia (now Kaliningrad, Russia); and Memel in Prussia (now Klaipėda, Lithuania). Wheat production and trade brought Prussia into a close relationship with the Hanseatic League during the period of time from 1356 (official founding of the Hanseatic League) until the decline of the League in about 1500.

The expansion of Prussia based on its connection with the Hanseatic League cut both Poland and Lithuania off from the coast of the Baltic Sea and trade abroad. This meant that Poland and Lithuania would be traditional enemies of Prussia, which was still called the Teutonic Knights.

== History ==
=== Teutonic Order ===
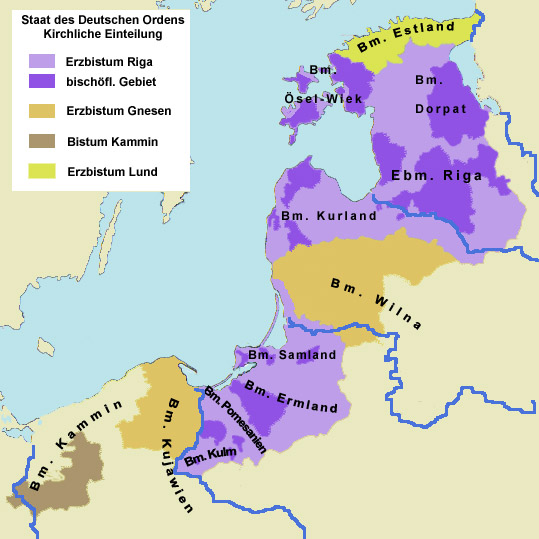
Situation after the conquest in the late 13th century. Areas in purple under control of the Monastic State of the Teutonic Knights.

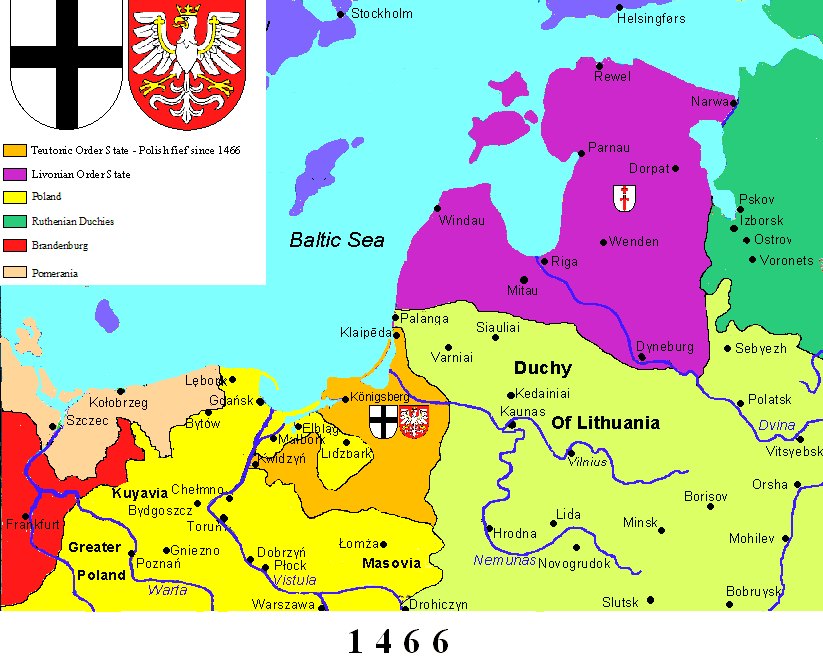
The Teutonic Order (orange) following the Second Peace of Thorn (1466)

In 1211, King Andrew II of Hungary granted Burzenland in Transylvania as a fiefdom to the Teutonic Knights, a German military order of crusading knights, headquartered in the Kingdom of Jerusalem at Acre. In 1225, he expelled them, and they transferred their operations to the Baltic Sea area. Konrad I, the Polish Duke of Masovia, had unsuccessfully attempted to conquer pagan Prussia in 1219 and 1222 during the Northern Crusades. In 1226, Duke Konrad invited the Teutonic Knights to conquer the Baltic Prussian tribes on his borders.

During 60 years of struggles against the Old Prussians, the Order established an independent state that came to control Prūsa. After the Livonian Brothers of the Sword joined the Teutonic Order in 1237, the Order also controlled Livonia (now Latvia and Estonia). Around 1252 they finished the conquest of the northernmost Prussian tribe of the Skalvians as well as of the western Baltic Curonians, and erected Memel Castle, which developed into the major port city of Memel. The Treaty of Melno defined the final border between Prussia and the adjoining Grand Duchy of Lithuania in 1422.

The Hanseatic League officially formed in northern Europe in 1356 as a group of trading cities. This League came to hold a monopoly on all trade leaving the interior of Europe and Scandinavia and on all sailing trade in the Baltic Sea for foreign countries.

In the course of the Ostsiedlung (German eastward expansion) process, settlers were invited by German-speaking episcopal and secular authorities, bringing changes in the ethnic composition as well as in language, culture, and law of the eastern borders of the German lands. As a majority of these settlers were Germans, Low German became the dominant language.

The Knights of the Teutonic Order were subordinate to the papacy and to the Holy Roman Emperor. Their initially close relationship with the Polish Crown deteriorated after they conquered Polish-controlled Pomerelia and Danzig in 1308. Eventually, Poland and Lithuania, allied through the Union of Krewo (1385), defeated the Knights in the Battle of Grunwald (Tannenberg) in 1410.

The Thirteen Years' War (1454–1466) began when the Prussian Confederation, a coalition of Hanseatic cities of western Prussia, rebelled against the Order and requested help from the Polish king, Casimir IV Jagiellon. The Teutonic Knights were forced to acknowledge the sovereignty of, and to pay tribute to Casimir IV in the Second Peace of Thorn (1466), losing western Prussia (Royal Prussia) to Poland in the process. Pursuant to the Second Peace of Thorn, two Prussian states were established.

During the period of the monastic state of the Teutonic Knights, mercenaries from the Holy Roman Empire were granted lands by the Order and gradually formed a new landed Prussian nobility, from which the Junkers would evolve to take a major role in the militarization of Prussia and, later, Germany.

=== Duchy of Prussia ===
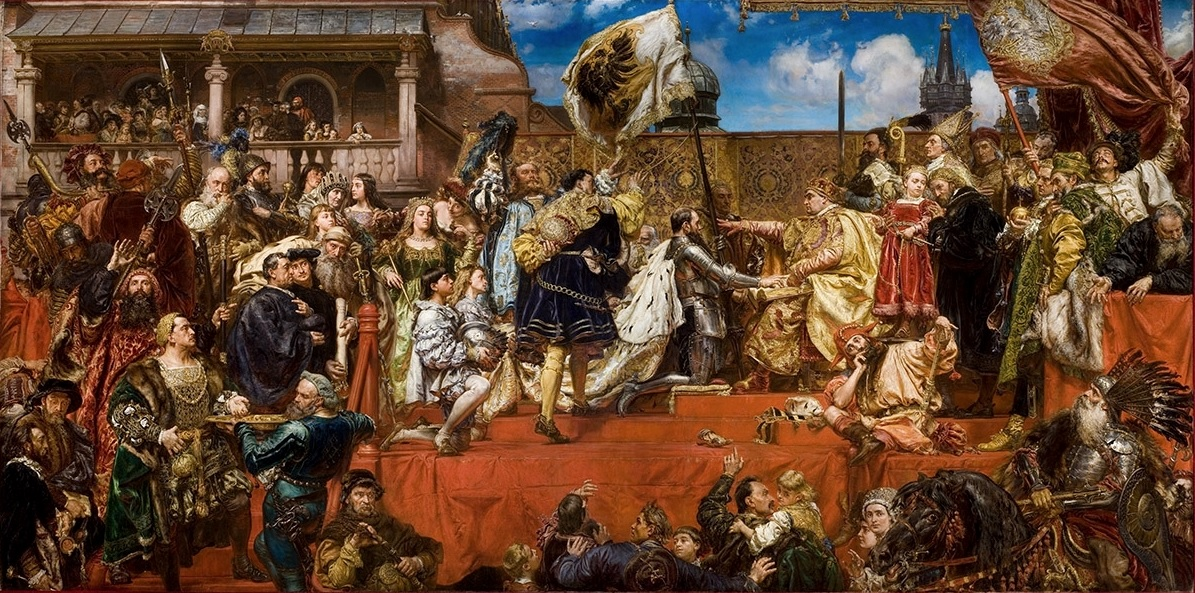
Prussian Homage by Jan Matejko. After admitting the dependence of Prussia to the Polish Crown, Albert of Prussia receives Ducal Prussia as a fief from King Sigismund I the Old of Poland in 1525.

On 10 April 1525, after signing of the Treaty of Kraków, which officially ended the Polish–Teutonic War (1519–21), in the main square of the Polish capital Kraków, Albert I resigned his position as Grand Master of the Teutonic Order and received the title "Duke of Prussia" from King Zygmunt I the Old of Poland. As a symbol of vassalage, Albert received a standard with the Prussian coat of arms from the Polish king. The black Prussian eagle on the flag was augmented with a letter "S" (for Sigismundus) and had a crown placed around its neck as a symbol of submission to Poland. Albert I, a member of a cadet branch of the House of Hohenzollern became a Lutheran Protestant and secularized the Order's Prussian territories. This was the area east of the mouth of the Vistula river, later sometimes called "Prussia proper". For the first time, these lands came into the hands of a branch of the Hohenzollern family, who already ruled the Margraviate of Brandenburg, since the 15th century. Furthermore, with his renunciation of the Order, Albert could now marry and produce legitimate heirs.

=== Brandenburg-Prussia ===
Brandenburg and Prussia united two generations later. In 1594 Duchess Anna of Prussia, granddaughter of Albert I and daughter of Albert Frederick, Duke of Prussia (reigned 1568–1618), married her cousin Elector John Sigismund of Brandenburg. When Albert Frederick died in 1618 without male heirs, John Sigismund was granted the right of succession to the Duchy of Prussia, then still a Polish fief. From this time the Duchy of Prussia was in personal union with the Margraviate of Brandenburg. The resulting state, known as Brandenburg-Prussia, consisted of geographically disconnected territories in Prussia, Brandenburg, and the Rhineland lands of Cleves and Mark.

During the Thirty Years' War (1618–1648), various armies repeatedly marched across the disconnected Hohenzollern lands, especially the occupying Swedes. The ineffective and militarily weak Elector George William (1619–1640) fled from Berlin to Königsberg, the historic capital of the Duchy of Prussia, in 1637. His successor, Frederick William I (1640–1688), reformed the army to defend the lands.

Frederick William I went to Warsaw in 1641 to render homage to King Władysław IV Vasa of Poland for the Duchy of Prussia, which was still held in fief from the Polish crown. In January 1656, during the first phase of the Second Northern War (1654–1660), he received the duchy as a fief from the Swedish king who later granted him full sovereignty in the Treaty of Labiau (November 1656). In 1657 the Polish king renewed this grant in the treaties of Wehlau and Bromberg. With Prussia, the Brandenburg Hohenzollern dynasty now held a territory free of any feudal obligations, which constituted the basis for their later elevation to kings.

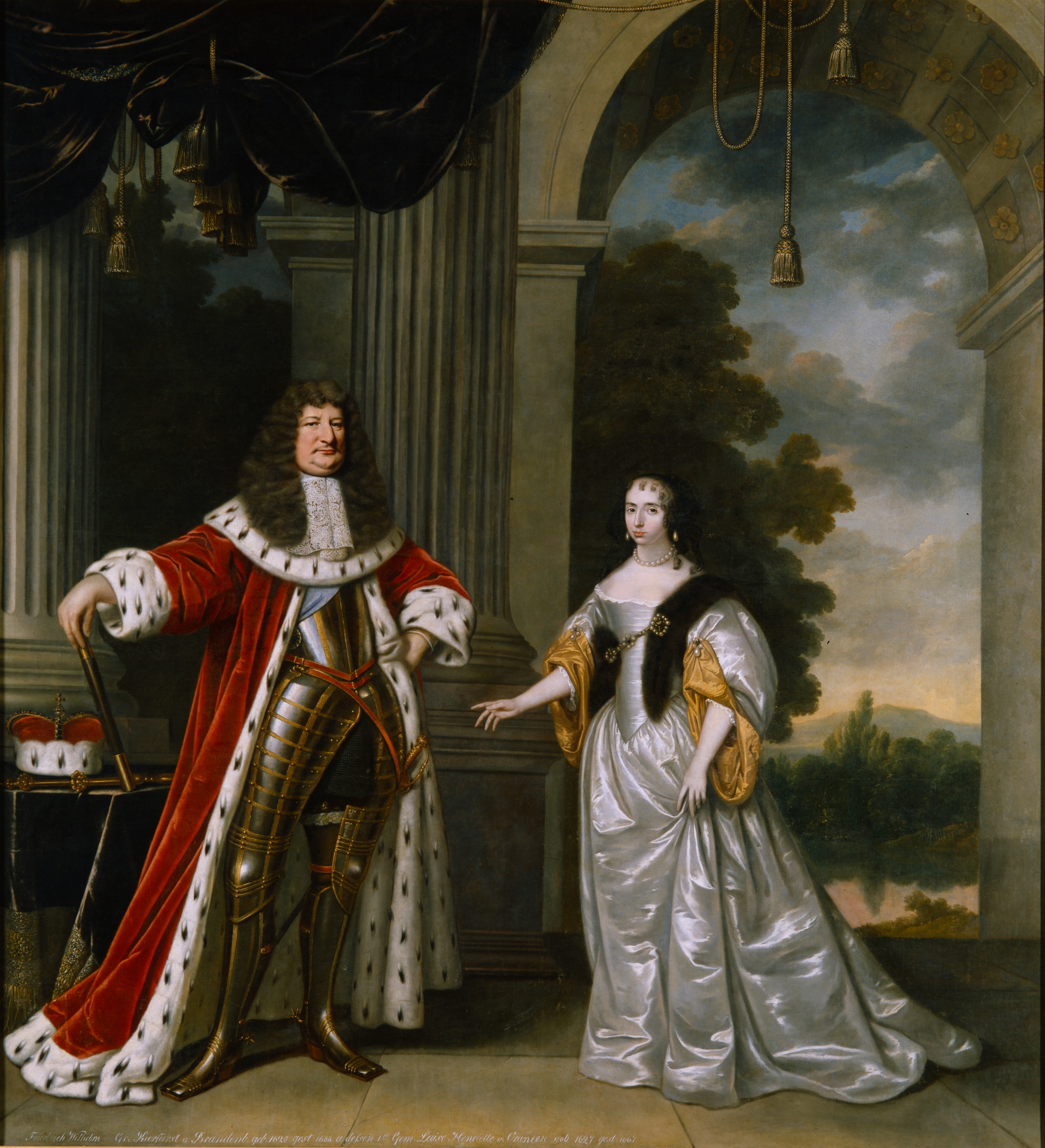
The "Great Elector" and his wife

Frederick William I succeeded in organizing the electorate by establishing an absolute monarchy in Brandenburg-Prussia, an achievement for which he became known as the "Great Elector". Above all, he emphasised the importance of a powerful military to protect the state's disconnected territories, while the Edict of Potsdam (1685) opened Brandenburg-Prussia for the immigration of Protestant refugees (especially Huguenots), and he established a bureaucracy to carry out state administration efficiently.

=== Kingdom of Prussia ===
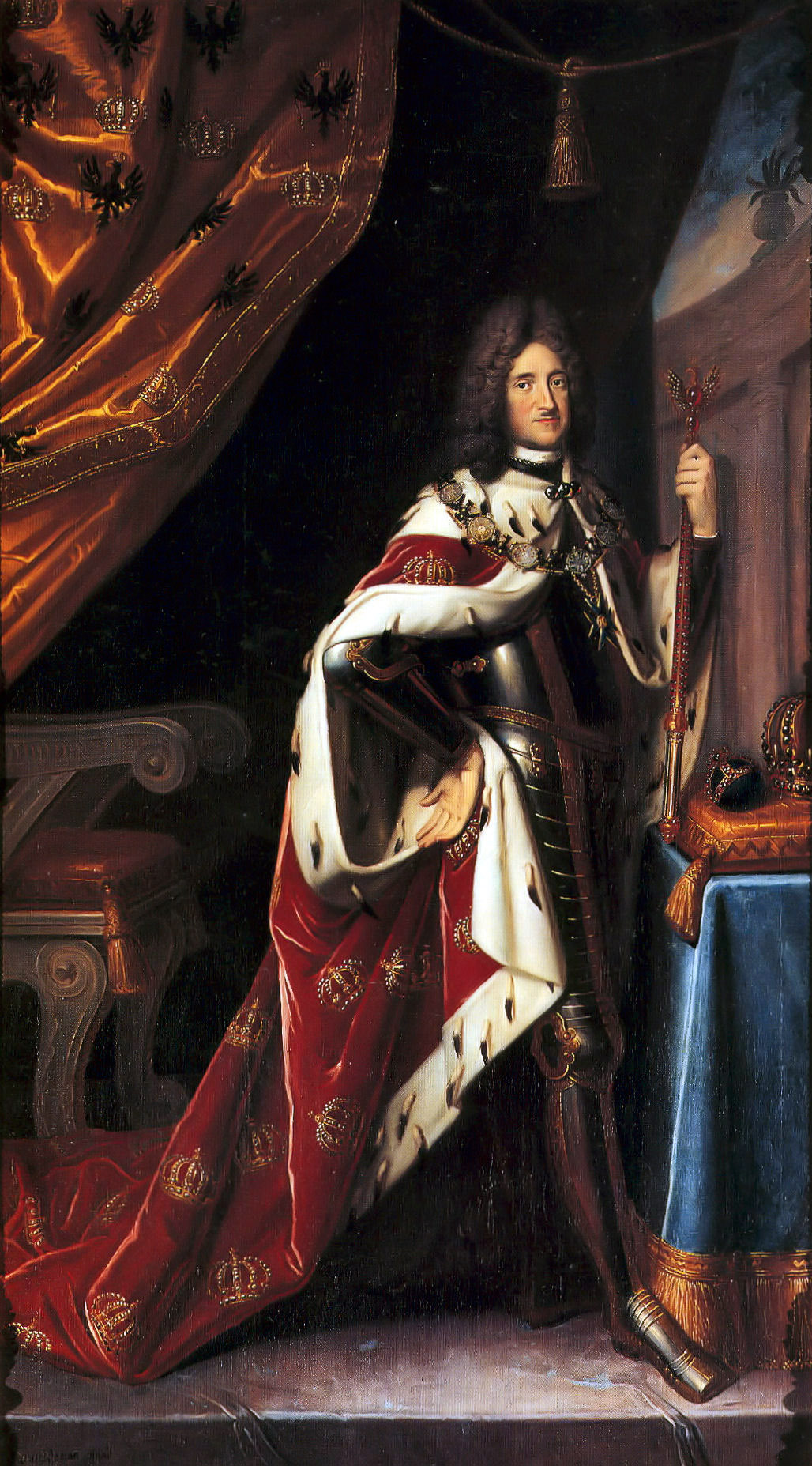
Frederick I, King in Prussia

On 18 January 1701, Frederick William's son, Elector Frederick III, elevated Prussia from a duchy to a kingdom and crowned himself King Frederick I. In the Crown Treaty of 16 November 1700, Leopold I, emperor of the Holy Roman Empire, allowed Frederick only to title himself "King in Prussia", not "King of Prussia". The state of Brandenburg-Prussia became commonly known as "Prussia", although most of its territory, in Brandenburg, Pomerania, and western Germany, lay outside Prussia proper. The Prussian state grew in splendour during the reign of Frederick I, who sponsored the arts at the expense of the treasury.

Frederick I was succeeded by his son, Frederick William I (1713–1740), the austere "Soldier King", who did not care for the arts but was thrifty and practical. He was the main creator of the vaunted Prussian bureaucracy and the professionalised standing army, which he developed into one of the most powerful in Europe. His troops only briefly saw action during the Great Northern War. In view of the size of the army in relation to the total population, Mirabeau, among others, has been attributed with coining the saying "Prussia, is not a state with an army, but an army with a state." Frederick William also settled more than 20,000 Protestant refugees from Salzburg in thinly populated East Prussia, which was eventually extended to the west bank of the Neman river, and other regions. In the Treaty of Stockholm (1720), he acquired half of Swedish Pomerania.

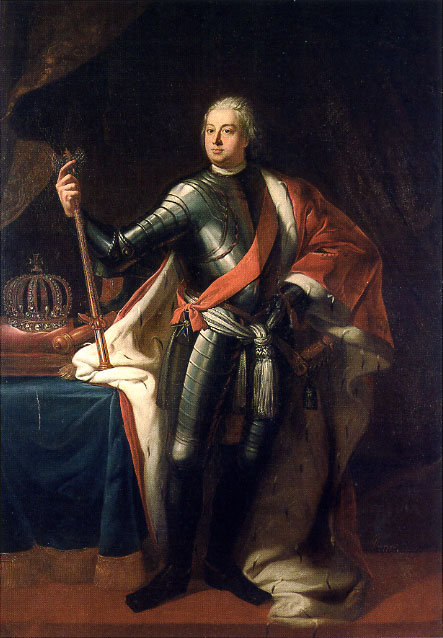
King Frederick William I, "the Soldier-King"

Frederick William I died in 1740 and was succeeded by his son, Frederick II, whose accomplishments led to his reputation as "Frederick the Great". As crown prince, Frederick had focused, primarily, on philosophy and the arts. He was an accomplished flute player and composer. In 1740, Prussian troops crossed over the undefended border of Silesia and rapidly conquered the region. Silesia was the richest province of Habsburg Austria. It signalled the beginning of three Silesian Wars (1740–1763). The First Silesian War (1740–1742) and the Second Silesian War (1744–1745) have, historically, been grouped together with the general European war called the War of the Austrian Succession (1740–1748). Charles VI, Holy Roman Emperor, had died on 20 October 1740. He was succeeded to the throne by his daughter, Maria Theresa.

By defeating the Austrian Army at the Battle of Mollwitz on 10 April 1741, Frederick succeeded in conquering Lower Silesia (the northwestern half of Silesia). In the next year, 1742, he conquered Upper Silesia (the southeastern half). Furthermore, in the Third Silesian War (part of the Seven Years' War) Frederick won a victory over Austria at the Battle of Lobositz on 1 October 1756. In spite of some victories afterward, his situation became far less comfortable the following years, as he failed in his attempts to knock Austria out of the war and was gradually reduced to a desperate defensive war. However, he never gave up and on 3 November 1760 the Prussian king won another battle, the hard-fought Battle of Torgau. Despite being several times on the verge of defeat Frederick, allied with Great Britain, Hanover and Hesse-Kassel, was finally able to hold the whole of Silesia against a coalition of Saxony, the Habsburg monarchy, France and Russia. Voltaire, a close friend of the king, once described Frederick the Great's Prussia by saying "...it was Sparta in the morning, Athens in the afternoon."

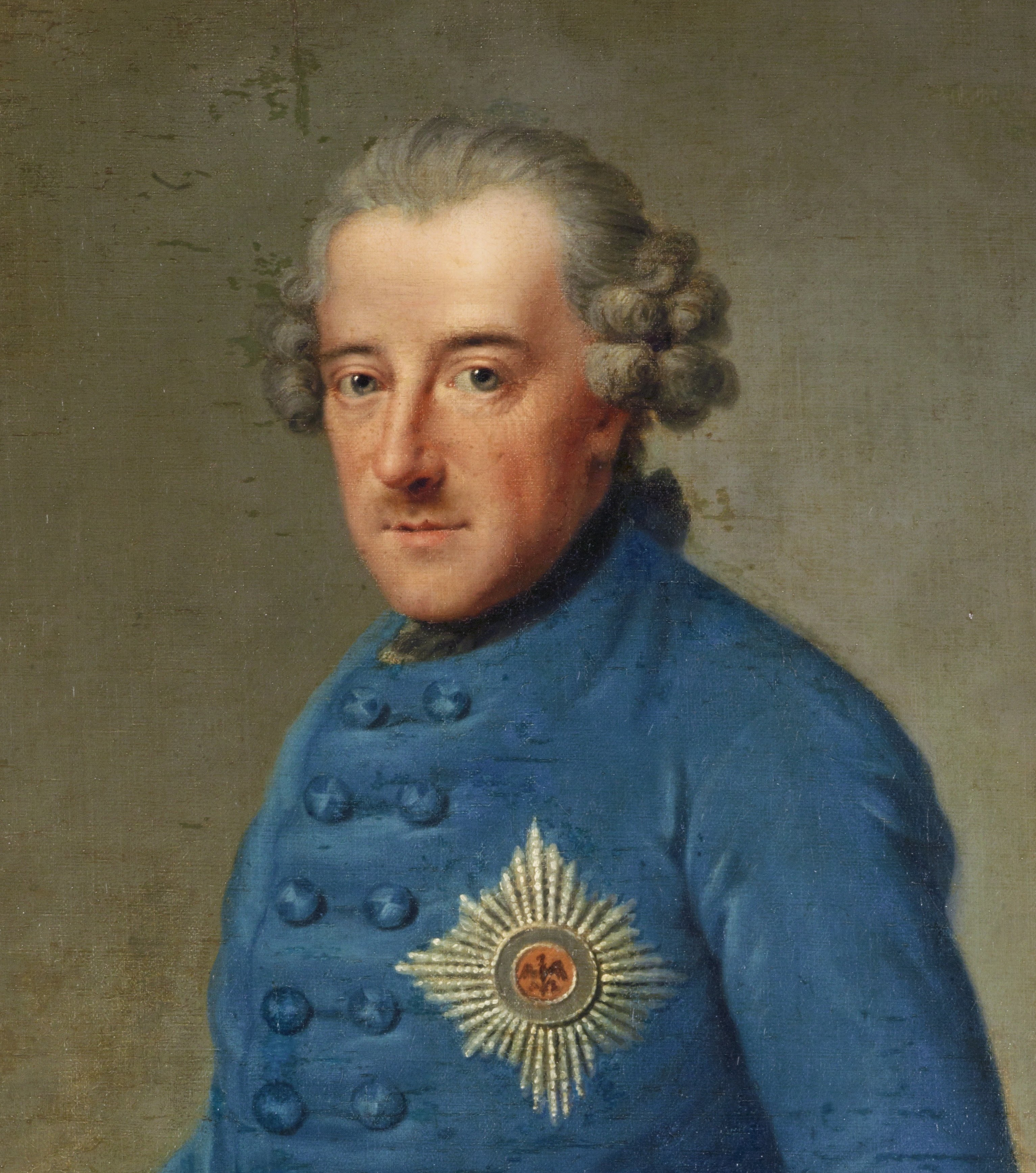
King Frederick II, "the Great"

Silesia, full of rich soils and prosperous manufacturing towns, became a vital region to Prussia, greatly increasing the nation's area, population, and wealth. Success on the battleground against Austria and other powers proved Prussia's status as one of the great powers of Europe. The Silesian Wars began more than a century of rivalry and conflict between Prussia and Austria as the two most powerful states operating within the Holy Roman Empire (although both had extensive territory outside the empire). In 1744, the County of East Frisia fell to Prussia following the extinction of its ruling Cirksena dynasty.

In the last 23 years of his reign until 1786, Frederick II, who understood himself as the "first servant of the state", promoted the development of Prussian areas such as the Oderbruch. At the same time he built up Prussia's military power and participated in the First Partition of Poland with Austria and Russia in 1772, an act that geographically connected the Brandenburg territories with those of Prussia proper. The partition also added Polish Royal Prussia to the kingdom, allowing Frederick to re-style himself King of Prussia. During this period, he also opened Prussia's borders to immigrants fleeing from religious persecution in other parts of Europe, such as the Huguenots. Prussia became a safe haven in much the same way that the United States welcomed immigrants seeking freedom in the 19th century.

Frederick the Great (reigned 1740–1786) practised enlightened absolutism. He built the world's best army, and usually won his many wars. He introduced a general civil code, abolished torture, and established the principle that the Crown would not interfere in matters of justice. He also promoted an advanced secondary education, the forerunner of today's German gymnasium (grammar school) system, which prepares the brightest pupils for university studies. The Prussian education system was emulated in various countries, including the United States.

==== Napoleonic Wars ====
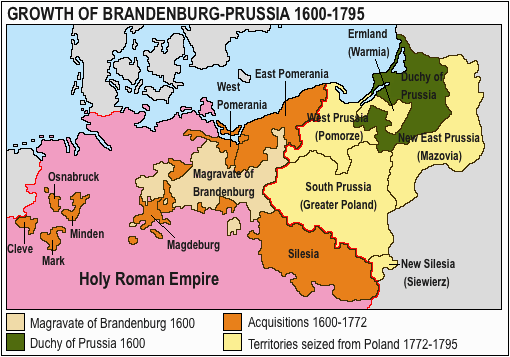
Growth of Brandenburg-Prussia, 1600–1795

During the reign of King Frederick William II (1786–1797), Prussia annexed additional Polish territory through the Second Partition of Poland in 1793 and the Third Partition of Poland in 1795. His successor, Frederick William III (1797–1840), announced the union of the Prussian Lutheran and Reformed churches into one church.

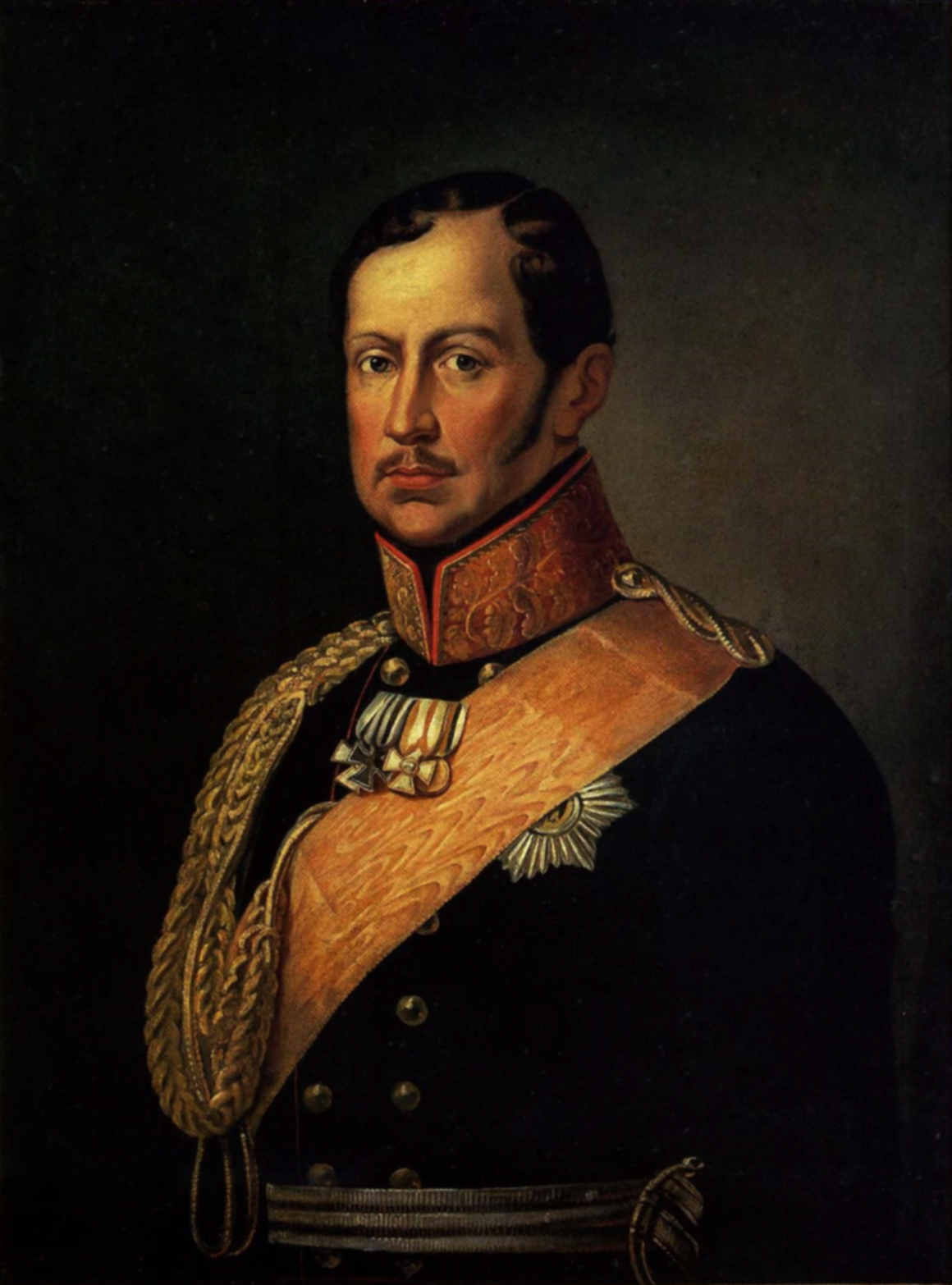
King Frederick William III

Prussia took a leading part in the French Revolutionary Wars, but remained quiet for more than a decade because of the Peace of Basel of 1795, only to go once more to war with France in 1806 as negotiations with that country over the allocation of the spheres of influence in Germany failed. Prussia suffered a devastating defeat against Napoleon's troops in the Battle of Jena-Auerstedt, leading Frederick William III and his family to flee temporarily to Memel. Under the Treaties of Tilsit in 1807, the state lost about one-third of its area, including the areas gained from the second and third Partitions of Poland, which now fell to the Duchy of Warsaw. Beyond that, the king was obliged to pay a large indemnity, to cap his army at 42,000 men, and to let the French garrison troops throughout Prussia, effectively making the kingdom a French satellite.

In response to this defeat, reformers such as Stein and Hardenberg set about modernising the Prussian state. Among their reforms were the liberation of peasants from serfdom, the Emancipation of Jews and making full citizens of them. The school system was rearranged, and in 1818 free trade was introduced. The process of army reform ended in 1813 with the introduction of compulsory military service for men. By 1813, Prussia could mobilize almost 300,000 soldiers, more than half of which were conscripts of the Landwehr of variable quality. The rest consisted of regular soldiers that were deemed excellent by most observers, and very determined to repair the humiliation of 1806.

After the defeat of Napoleon in Russia, Prussia quit its alliance with France and took part in the Sixth Coalition during the "Wars of Liberation" (Befreiungskriege) against the French occupation. Prussian troops under Marshal Gebhard Leberecht von Blücher contributed crucially (alongside the British and Dutch) to the final victory over Napoleon at the Battle of Waterloo of June 1815. Prussia's reward in 1815 at the Congress of Vienna was the recovery of her lost territories, as well as the whole of the Rhineland, Westphalia, 40% of Saxony and some other territories. These western lands were of vital importance because they included the Ruhr region, the centre of Germany's fledgling industrialisation, especially in the arms industry. These territorial gains also meant the doubling of Prussia's population. In exchange, Prussia withdrew from areas of central Poland to allow the creation of Congress Poland under Russian sovereignty. In 1815 Prussia became part of the German Confederation.

==== Wars of liberation ====
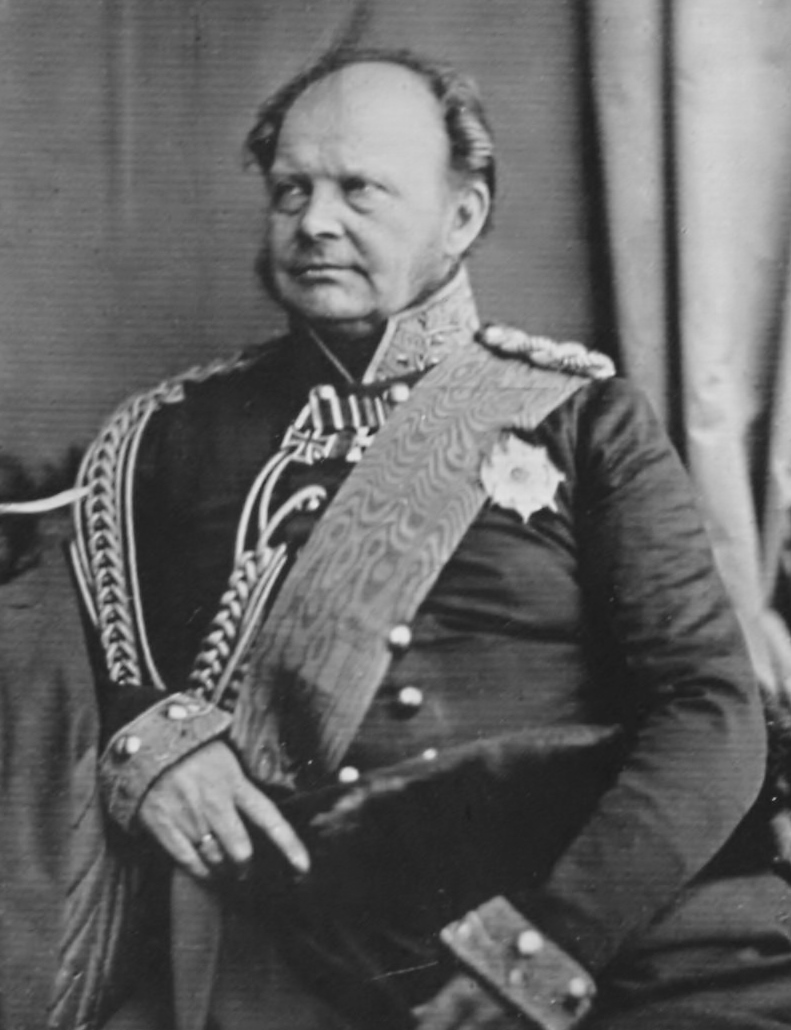
King Frederick William IV

The first half of the 19th century saw a prolonged struggle in Germany between liberals, who wanted a united, federal Germany under a democratic constitution, and conservatives, who wanted to maintain Germany as a patchwork of independent, monarchical states with Prussia and Austria competing for influence. One small movement that signalled a desire for German unification in this period was the Burschenschaft student movement, by students who encouraged the use of the black-red-gold flag, discussions of a unified German nation, and a progressive, liberal political system. Because of Prussia's size and economic importance, smaller states began to join its free trade area in the 1820s. Prussia benefited greatly from the creation in 1834 of the German Customs Union (Zollverein), which included most German states but excluded Austria.

In 1848, the liberals saw an opportunity when revolutions broke out across Europe. Alarmed, King Frederick William IV agreed to convene a National Assembly and grant a constitution. When the Frankfurt Parliament offered Frederick William the crown of a united Germany, he refused on the grounds that he would not accept a crown from a revolutionary assembly without the sanction of Germany's other monarchs.

The Frankfurt Parliament was forced to dissolve in 1849, and Frederick William issued a constitution by his own authority in 1850. This conservative document provided for a two-house parliament, the Landtag of Prussia. The lower house, or Prussian House of Representatives was elected by all males over the age of 25. They were divided into three classes whose votes were weighted according to the amount of taxes paid. In one typical election, the first class (with those who paid the most in taxes) included 4% of voters and the third class (with those who paid the least) had 82%, yet each group chose the same number of electors. The system all but assured dominance by the more well-to-do men of the population. The upper house, the Prussian House of Lords, was appointed by the king. He retained full executive authority, and ministers were responsible only to him. As a result, the grip of the landowning classes, the Junkers, remained unbroken, especially in the eastern provinces. The constitution nevertheless contained a number of liberal elements such as the introduction of jury courts and a catalog of fundamental rights that included freedom of religion, speech and the press.

==== Wars of unification ====
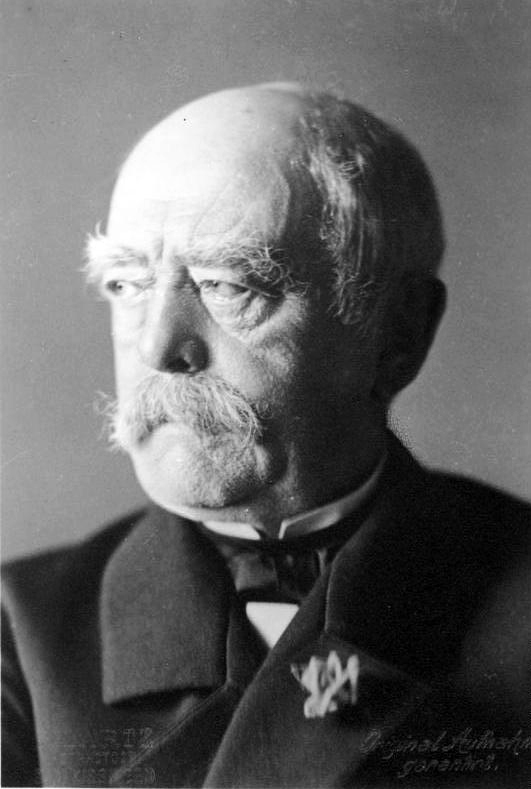
Otto von Bismarck

In 1862, King Wilhelm I appointed Otto von Bismarck as Minister President of Prussia. Bismarck was determined to defeat both the liberals and conservatives and increase Prussian supremacy and influence among the German states. There has been much debate as to whether Bismarck actually planned to create a united Germany when he set out on this journey, or whether he simply took advantage of the circumstances that fell into place. Bismarck curried support from large sections of the people by promising to lead the fight for greater German unification. He successfully guided Prussia through three wars, which unified Germany and brought William the position of German Emperor.

===== Schleswig Wars =====
The Kingdom of Denmark was at the time in personal union with the Duchies of Schleswig and Holstein, both of which had close ties with each other, although only Holstein was part of the German Confederation. When the Danish government tried to integrate Schleswig, but not Holstein, into the Danish state, Prussia led the German Confederation against Denmark in the First War of Schleswig (1848–1851). Because Russia supported Austria, Prussia also conceded predominance in the German Confederation to Austria in the Punctation of Olmütz in 1850, resulting in a return to the status quo.

In 1863, Denmark introduced a shared constitution for Denmark and Schleswig. This led to conflict with the German Confederation, which authorised the occupation of Holstein by the Confederation, from which Danish forces withdrew. In 1864, Prussian and Austrian forces crossed the border between Holstein and Schleswig initiating the Second War of Schleswig. The Austro-Prussian forces defeated the Danes, who surrendered both territories. In the resulting Gastein Convention of 1865 Prussia took over the administration of Schleswig while Austria assumed that of Holstein.

===== Austro-Prussian War =====
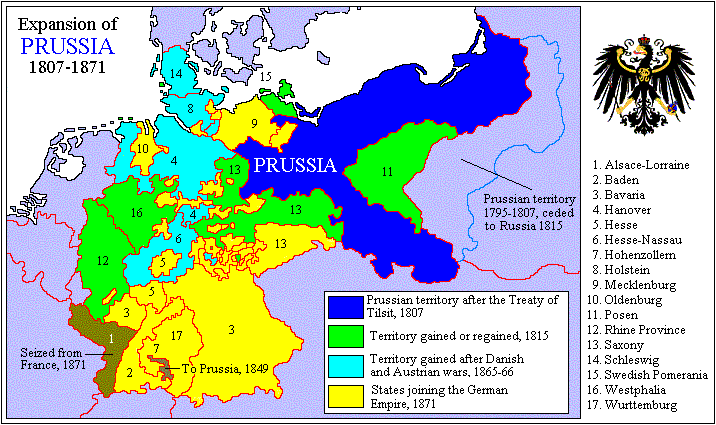
Expansion of Prussia, 1807–1871

Bismarck realised that the dual administration of Schleswig and Holstein was only a temporary solution, and tensions rose between Prussia and Austria. The struggle for supremacy in Germany then led to the Austro-Prussian War (1866), triggered by the dispute over Schleswig and Holstein, with Bismarck using proposed injustices as the reason for war.

On the Austrian side stood the south German states (including Bavaria and Württemberg), some central German states (including Saxony), and Hanover in the north. On the side of Prussia were Italy, most north German states, and some smaller central German states. Eventually, the better-armed Prussian troops won the crucial victory at the Battle of Königgrätz under Helmuth von Moltke the Elder. The century-long struggle between Berlin and Vienna for the dominance of Germany was now over. As a sideshow in this war, Prussia defeated Hanover in the Battle of Langensalza (1866). While Hanover hoped in vain for help from Britain (as they had previously been in personal union), Britain stayed out of a confrontation with a continental great power and Prussia satisfied its desire for merging the once separate territories and gaining strong economic and strategic power, particularly from the full access to the resources of the Ruhr.

Bismarck desired Austria as an ally in the future, and so he declined to annex any Austrian territory. But in the Peace of Prague in 1866, Prussia annexed four of Austria's allies in northern and central Germany – Hanover, Hesse-Kassel, Nassau and Frankfurt. Prussia also won full control of Schleswig-Holstein. As a result of these territorial gains, Prussia now stretched uninterrupted across the northern two-thirds of Germany and contained two-thirds of Germany's population. The German Confederation was dissolved, and Prussia impelled the 21 states north of the Main river into forming the North German Confederation.

Prussia was the dominant state in the new confederation, as the kingdom comprised almost four-fifths of the new state's territory and population. Prussia's near-total control over the confederation was secured in the constitution drafted for it by Bismarck in 1867. Executive power was held by a president, assisted by a chancellor responsible only to him. The presidency was a hereditary office of the Hohenzollern rulers of Prussia. There was also a two-house parliament. The lower house, or Reichstag (Diet), was elected by universal male suffrage. The upper house, or Bundesrat (Federal Council) was appointed by the state governments. The Bundesrat was, in practice, the stronger chamber. Prussia had 17 of 43 votes, and could easily control proceedings through alliances with the other states.

As a result of the peace negotiations, the states south of the Main remained theoretically independent, but received the (compulsory) protection of Prussia. Additionally, mutual defence treaties were concluded. However, the existence of these treaties was kept secret until Bismarck made them public in 1867 when France tried to acquire Luxembourg.

===== Franco-Prussian War =====
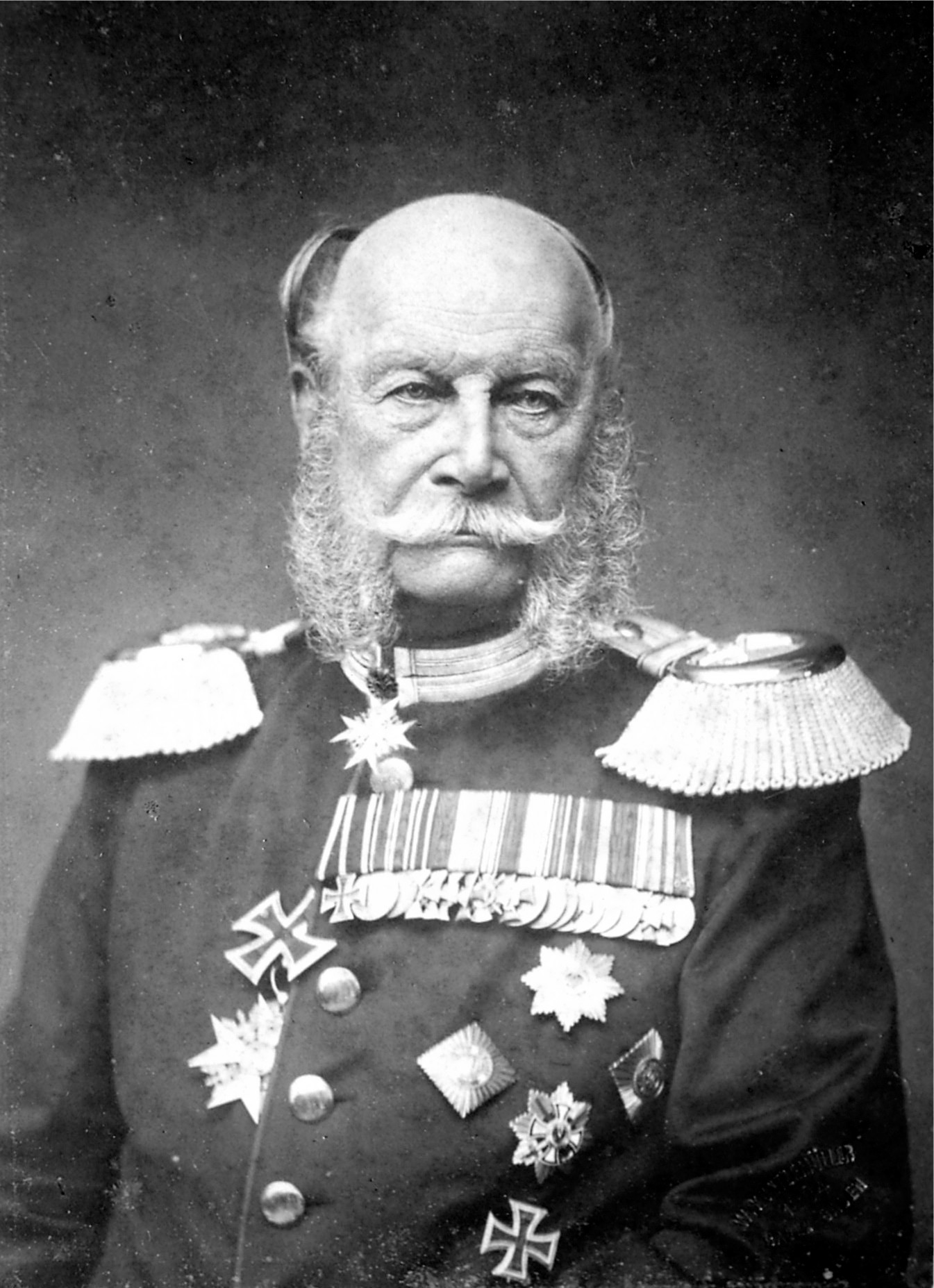
Kaiser Wilhelm I

The controversy with the Second French Empire over the candidacy of Leopold, Prince of Hohenzollern to the Spanish throne was escalated both by France and Bismarck. With his Ems Dispatch, Bismarck took advantage of an incident in which the French ambassador had approached William. The government of Napoleon III, expecting another civil war among the German states, declared war against Prussia, continuing Franco-German enmity. However, honouring their treaties, the German states joined forces and quickly defeated France in the Franco-Prussian War in 1870. Following victory under Bismarck's and Prussia's leadership, Baden, Württemberg and Bavaria, which had remained outside the North German Confederation, accepted incorporation into a united German Empire.

The empire was a "Lesser German" solution (in German, "kleindeutsche Lösung") to the question of uniting all German-speaking peoples into one state, because it excluded Austria, which remained connected to Hungary and whose territories included non-German populations. On 18 January 1871 (the 170th anniversary of the coronation of King Frederick I), William was proclaimed "German Emperor" (not "Emperor of Germany") in the Hall of Mirrors at Versailles outside of Paris, while the French capital was still under siege.

==== German Empire ====
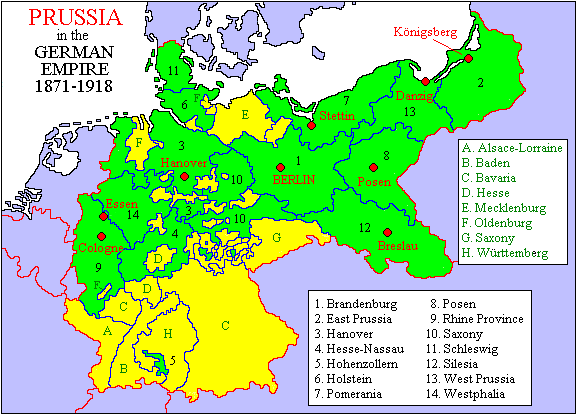
Prussia in the German Empire from 1871 to 1918

The two decades after the unification of Germany were the peak of Prussia's fortunes, but the seeds for potential strife were built into the Prusso-German political system.

The Constitution of the German Empire was a version of the North German Confederation's constitution. Officially, the German Empire was a federal state. In practice, Prussia overshadowed the rest of the empire. Prussia included three-fifths of the German territory and two-thirds of its population. The Imperial German Army was, in practice, an enlarged Prussian army, although the other kingdoms (Bavaria, Saxony and Württemberg) retained their own small armies, coming under Imperial control in wartime. The imperial crown was a hereditary office of the House of Hohenzollern, the royal house of Prussia. The Minister President of Prussia was, except for two brief periods (January–November 1873 and 1892–94), also imperial chancellor. But the empire itself had no right to collect taxes directly from its subjects; the only incomes fully under federal control were the customs duties, common excise duties, and the revenue from postal and telegraph services. While all men above age 25 were eligible to vote in imperial elections, Prussia retained its restrictive three-class voting system. This effectively required the king/emperor and prime minister/chancellor to seek majorities from legislatures elected by two different franchises. In both the kingdom and the empire, the original constituencies were never redrawn to reflect changes in population, meaning that rural areas were grossly overrepresented by the turn of the 20th century.

As a result, Prussia and the German Empire were something of a paradox. Bismarck knew that his new German Empire was now a colossus and economically and militarily dominant in Europe; Britain was still dominant in finance, trade and at sea. He declared Germany a "satisfied" power, using his talents to preserve peace, for example at the Congress of Berlin. Bismarck did not set up his own party. He had mixed success in some of his domestic policies. His anti-Catholic Kulturkampf inside Prussia (and not the wider German state) was a failure. He ended his support for the anticlerical Liberals and worked instead with the Catholic Centre Party. He tried to destroy the socialist movement, with limited success. The large Polish population resisted Germanisation.

Frederick III became emperor in March 1888, after the death of his father, but he died of cancer only 99 days later.

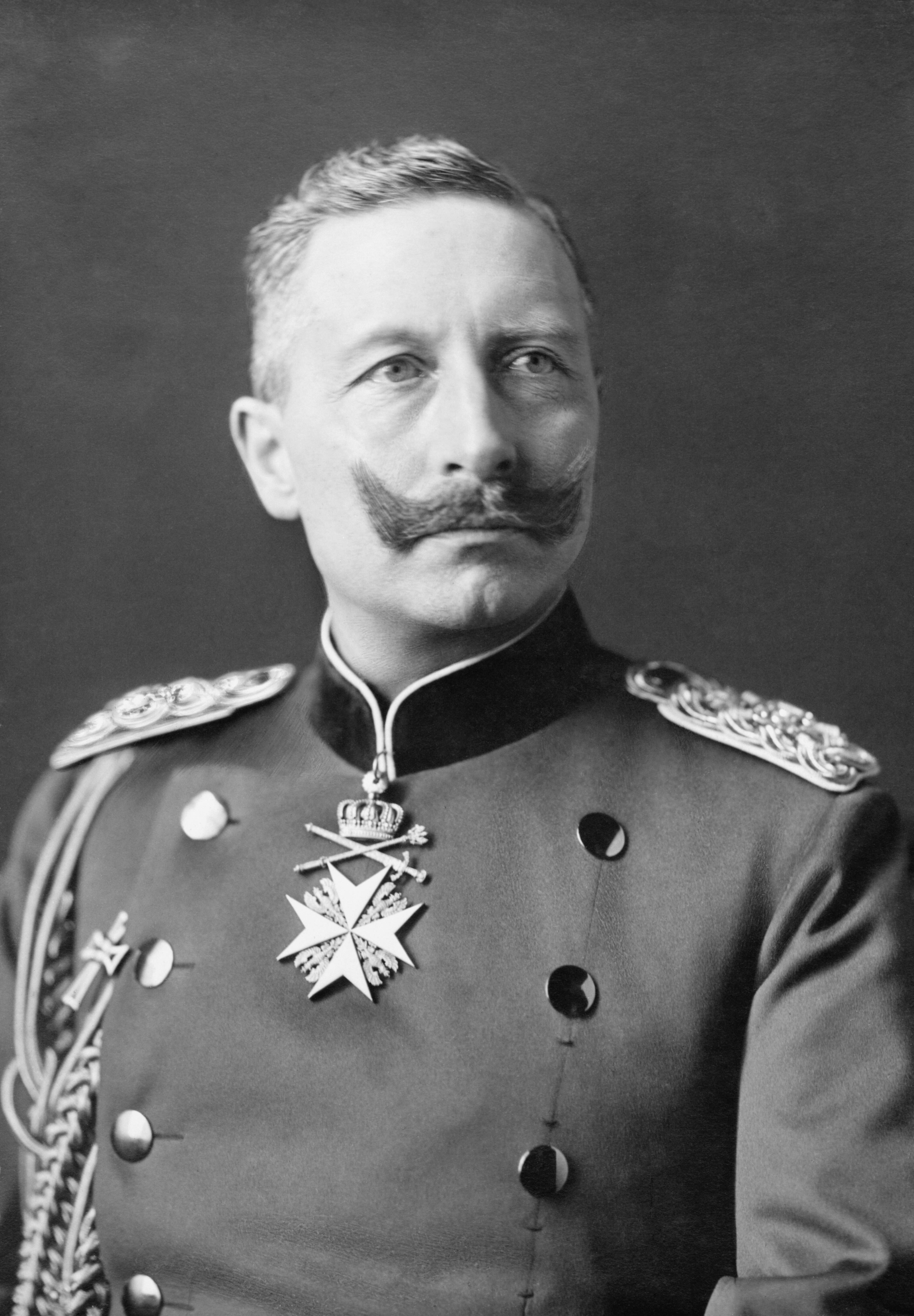
Kaiser Wilhelm II

At age 29, Wilhelm became Kaiser Wilhelm II after a difficult youth and conflicts with his British mother Victoria, Princess Royal. He turned out to be a man of limited experience, narrow and reactionary views, poor judgment, and occasional bad temper, which alienated former friends and allies.

=== Railways ===
Prussia nationalised its railways in the 1880s in an effort both to lower rates on freight service and to equalise those rates among shippers. Instead of lowering rates as far as possible, the government ran the railways as a profit-making endeavour, and the railway profits became a major source of revenue for the state. The nationalisation of the railways slowed the economic development of Prussia because the state favoured the relatively backward agricultural areas in its railway building. Moreover, the railway surpluses substituted for the development of an adequate tax system.

=== The Free State of Prussia in the Weimar Republic ===
Because of the German Revolution of 1918, Wilhelm II abdicated as German Emperor and King of Prussia. Prussia was proclaimed a "Free State" (i.e. a republic, German: Freistaat) within the new Weimar Republic and in 1920 received a democratic constitution.

Almost all of Germany's territorial losses, specified in the Treaty of Versailles, were areas that had been part of Prussia: Eupen and Malmedy to Belgium; North Schleswig to Denmark; the Memel Territory to Lithuania; the Hultschin area to Czechoslovakia. Many of the areas Prussia annexed in the partitions of Poland, such as the provinces of Posen and West Prussia, as well as eastern Upper Silesia, went to the Second Polish Republic. Danzig became the Free City of Danzig under the administration of the League of Nations. Also, the Saargebiet was created mainly from formerly Prussian territories, except present Saarpfalz district, which was part of the Kingdom of Bavaria. East Prussia became an exclave, only reachable by ship (the Sea Service East Prussia) or by a railway through the Polish corridor.

Federal states of the Weimar Republic, with Prussia in light gray. After World War I the provinces of Posen and West Prussia came largely to the 2nd Polish Republic; Posen-West Prussia and the West Prussia district were formed from the remaining parts.

The German government seriously considered breaking up Prussia into smaller states, but eventually traditionalist sentiment prevailed and Prussia became by far the largest state of the Weimar Republic, comprising 60% of its territory. With the abolition of the older Prussian franchise, it became a stronghold of the left. Its incorporation of "Red Berlin" and the industrialised Ruhr Area, both with working-class majorities, ensured left-wing dominance.

From 1919 to 1932, Prussia was governed by a coalition of the Social Democrats, Catholic Centre and German Democrats; from 1921 to 1925, coalition governments included the German People's Party. Unlike in other states of the German Reich, majority rule by democratic parties in Prussia was never endangered. Nevertheless, in East Prussia and some rural areas, the Nazi Party of Adolf Hitler gained more and more influence and popular support, especially from the lower middle class starting in 1930. Except for Catholic Upper Silesia, the Nazi Party in 1932 became the largest party in most parts of the Free State of Prussia. However, the democratic parties in coalition remained a majority, while Communists and Nazis were in the opposition.

The East Prussian Otto Braun, who was Prussian minister-president almost continuously from 1920 to 1932, is considered one of the most capable Social Democrats in history. He implemented several trend-setting reforms together with his minister of the interior, Carl Severing, which were also models for the later Federal Republic of Germany. For instance, a Prussian minister-president could be forced out of office only if there was a "positive majority" for a potential successor. This concept, known as the constructive vote of no confidence, was carried over into the Basic Law for the Federal Republic of Germany. Most historians regard the Prussian government during this time as far more successful than that of Germany as a whole.

In contrast to its pre-war authoritarianism, Prussia was a pillar of democracy in the Weimar Republic. Prussia's democratic government was effectively brought to an end by the Preußenschlag ("Prussian coup") of Reich Chancellor Franz von Papen. In this coup d'état, the government of the Reich removed the incumbent Prussian government from effective control on 20 July 1932, under the pretext that the latter had lost control of public order in Prussia (during the Bloody Sunday of Altona, which was still part of Prussia at that time) and by using fabricated evidence that the Social Democrats and the Communists were planning a joint "putsch". The Defence Minister General Kurt von Schleicher, who was the prime mover behind the coup, manufactured evidence that the Prussian police under Braun's orders were favouring the Communist Rotfrontkämpferbund in street clashes with the SA as part of an alleged plan to foment a Marxist revolution, which he used to get an emergency decree from President Paul von Hindenburg imposing Reich control on Prussia. Under the emergency decree, Papen became Reich commissioner for Prussia and assumed control of the Prussian government. The Preußenschlag therefore ended the effective independence of Prussia's democratically elected government, but did not abolish the Prussian State itself. The Preußenschlag made it easier, only half a year later, for Hitler to consolidate power in Germany, since the apparatus of the Prussian government, including the police, had already been brought under Reich control.

=== Prussia and Nazi Germany ===
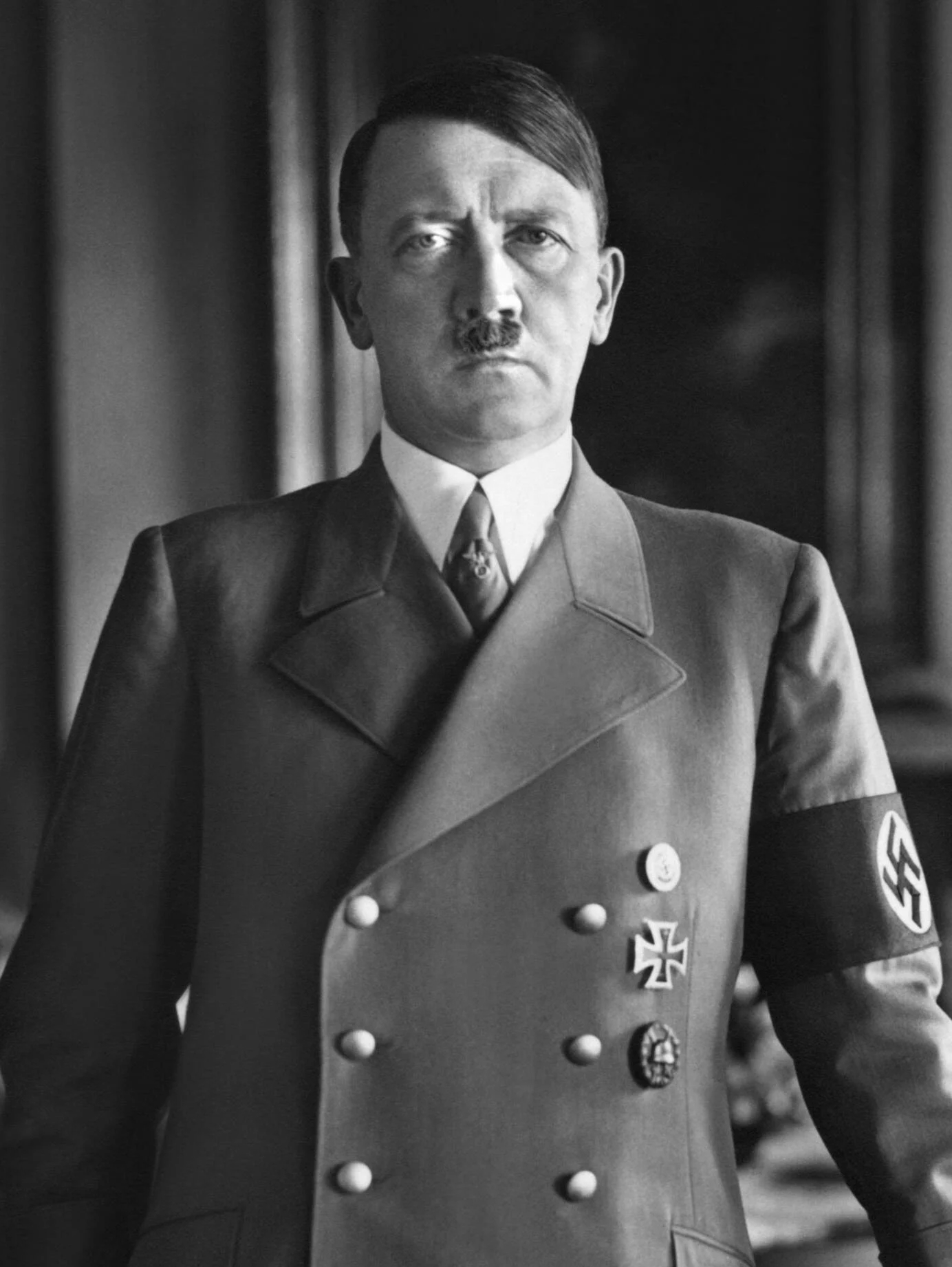
Adolf Hitler

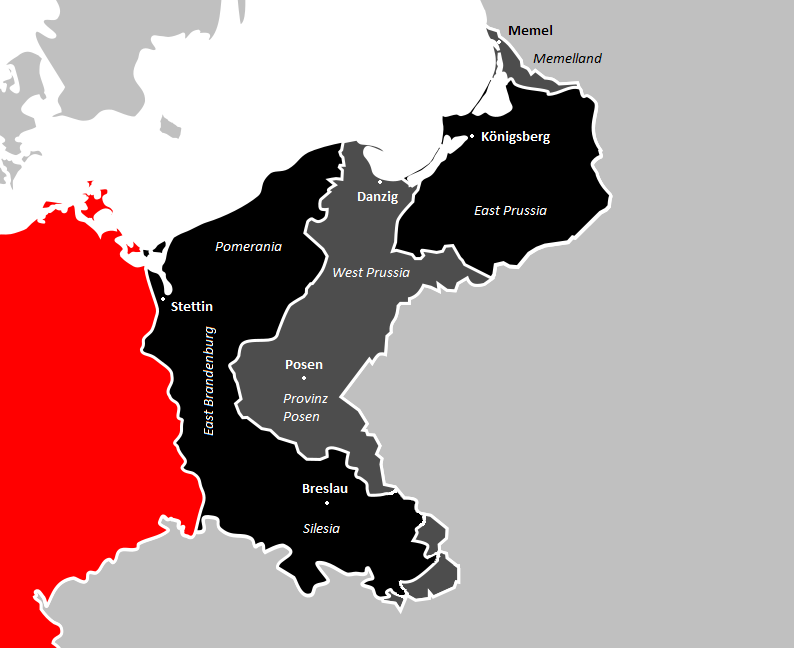
Territory lost after World War I Territory lost after World War II Present-day Germany

After the appointment of Hitler as the new chancellor, the Nazis used the absence of Franz von Papen as an opportunity to appoint Hermann Göring federal commissioner for the Prussian ministry of the interior. The Reichstag election of 5 March 1933 strengthened the position of the National Socialist German Workers' Party (NSDAP or "Nazi" Party), although they did not achieve an absolute majority.

The Reichstag building having been set on fire a few weeks earlier on 27 February, a new Reichstag was opened in the Garrison Church of Potsdam on 21 March 1933 in the presence of President Paul von Hindenburg. In a propaganda-filled meeting between Hitler and the Nazi Party, the "marriage of old Prussia with young Germany" was celebrated, to win over the Prussian monarchists, conservatives and nationalists and induce them into supporting and subsequently voting in favour of the Enabling Act of 1933.

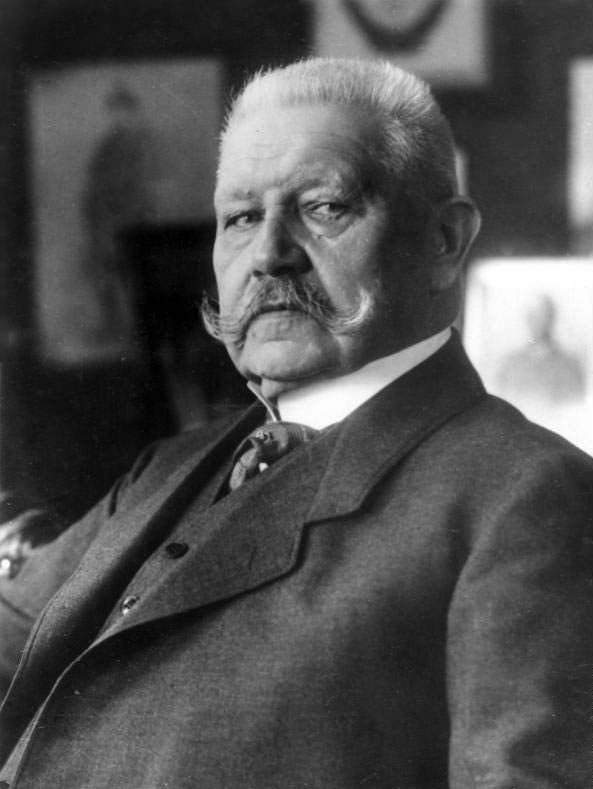
Paul von Hindenburg

In the centralised state created by the Nazis in the "Law on the Reconstruction of the Reich" ("Gesetz über den Neuaufbau des Reichs", 30 January 1934) and the "Law on Reich Governors" ("Reichsstatthaltergesetz", 30 January 1935) the states were dissolved, in fact if not in law. The state Landtage were abolished and the state governments were now controlled by Reichsstatthaltern (Reich Governors) who were appointed by the chancellor. Parallel to that, the organisation of the party into districts (Gaue) gained increasing importance, as the official in charge of a Gau (the head of which was called a Gauleiter) was again appointed by the chancellor who was at the same time chief of the Nazi Party.

This centralising policy went even further in Prussia. From 1934 to 1945, almost all ministries were merged and only a few departments were able to maintain their independence. Hitler himself became formally the governor of Prussia. However, his functions were exercised by Hermann Göring as Prussian prime minister.

As provided for in the "Greater Hamburg Act" ("Groß-Hamburg-Gesetz"), certain exchanges of territory took place. Prussia was extended on 1 April 1937, for instance, by the incorporation of the Free and Hanseatic City of Lübeck.

The Prussian lands transferred to Poland after the Treaty of Versailles were re-annexed during World War II. However, most of this territory was not reintegrated back into Prussia but assigned to separate Gaue of Danzig-West Prussia and Wartheland during much of the duration of the war.

=== The end of Prussia ===
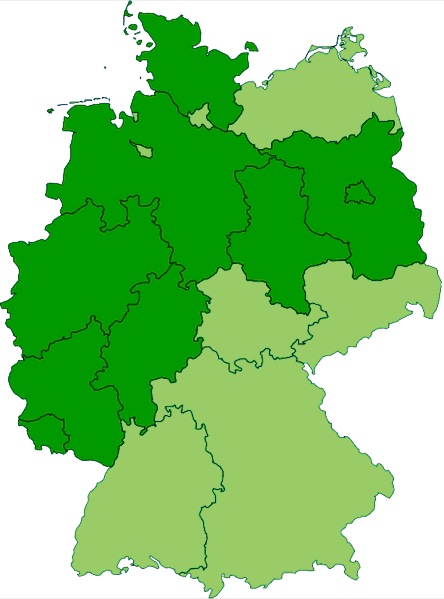
Map of the current states of Germany, in dark green are states that are completely or mostly situated inside the old borders of Imperial Germany's Kingdom of Prussia

Germany's defeat in 1945 fundamentally transformed the territory and population of historic Prussia. The United States, United Kingdom and Soviet Union met at the Potsdam Conference to determine aspects of the post-war occupation and territorial settlement of defeated Germany. Under the agreement reached at Potsdam the German territories east of the Oder–Neisse line, including most of Eastern Prussia, Western Prussia, Pomerania and Silesia, were annexed by Poland and the Soviet Union. This included important Prussian cities like Danzig, Königsberg, Breslau, and Stettin. The Soviet Union retained most of the easter territories of pre-war Poland that it had annexed following the Soviet invasion of Poland in 1939, while Poland's post-war territory shifted westward to include post-war German lands in Silesia, Pomerania, and southern East Prussia. Much of the population fled or was evacuated westward during the final stages of the war as the Red Army advanced, while most of those remaining were forcefully expelled from the territories placed under Polish and Soviet administration.

As part of their wartime goals, the Western allies sought the abolition of Prussia. Stalin was initially content to retain the name, Russians having a different historical view of their neighbour and sometime former ally. Nonetheless, by Law No. 46, which was accepted and implemented by the Allied Control Council comprising the United States, United Kingdom, Soviet Union, and France on 25 February 1947, Prussia was officially proclaimed to be dissolved.

In the Soviet occupation zone, which became East Germany (officially, the German Democratic Republic) in 1949, the former Prussian territories were reorganised into the states of Brandenburg and Saxony-Anhalt, with the remaining parts of the Province of Pomerania going to Mecklenburg-Western Pomerania. These states were de facto abolished in 1952 in favour of Bezirke (districts), but were recreated shortly before German reunification in 1990.

In the Western Zones of occupation, which became West Germany (officially, the Federal Republic of Germany) in 1949, the former Prussian territories were divided up among North Rhine-Westphalia, Lower Saxony, Hesse, Rhineland-Palatinate and Schleswig-Holstein. Württemberg-Baden and Württemberg-Hohenzollern were later merged with Baden to create the state of Baden-Württemberg. The Saar region, which had been administered by the French as a protectorate separate from the rest of Western Germany, was admitted to the Federal Republic of Germany as a separate state following the 1955 Saar Statute referendum.

One year later, in 1957, the Prussian Cultural Heritage Foundation was established and implemented by federal statutes in West Germany in response to a ruling from the Federal Constitutional Court of Germany. The fundamental goal of this institution is protecting the cultural legacy of Prussia. As of 2021, it continues to operate from its headquarters in Berlin.

== Administrative and constitutional frameworks ==
In the mid-16th century, the margraves of Brandenburg had become highly dependent on the estates (representing counts, lords, knights, and towns, but not prelates, owing to the Protestant Reformation in 1538). The margraviate's liabilities and tax income as well as the margrave's finances were in the hands of the Kreditwerk, an institution not controlled by the elector, and of the Großer Ausschuß (Great Committee) of the estates. This was because of concessions made by Elector Joachim II Hector in 1541 in return for financial aid by the estates; however, the Kreditwerk went bankrupt between 1618 and 1625. The margraves further had to yield to the veto of the estates in all issues concerning the "better or worse of the country", in all legal commitments, and in all issues concerning pawn or sale of the elector's real property.

Hohenzollern residence in Berlin

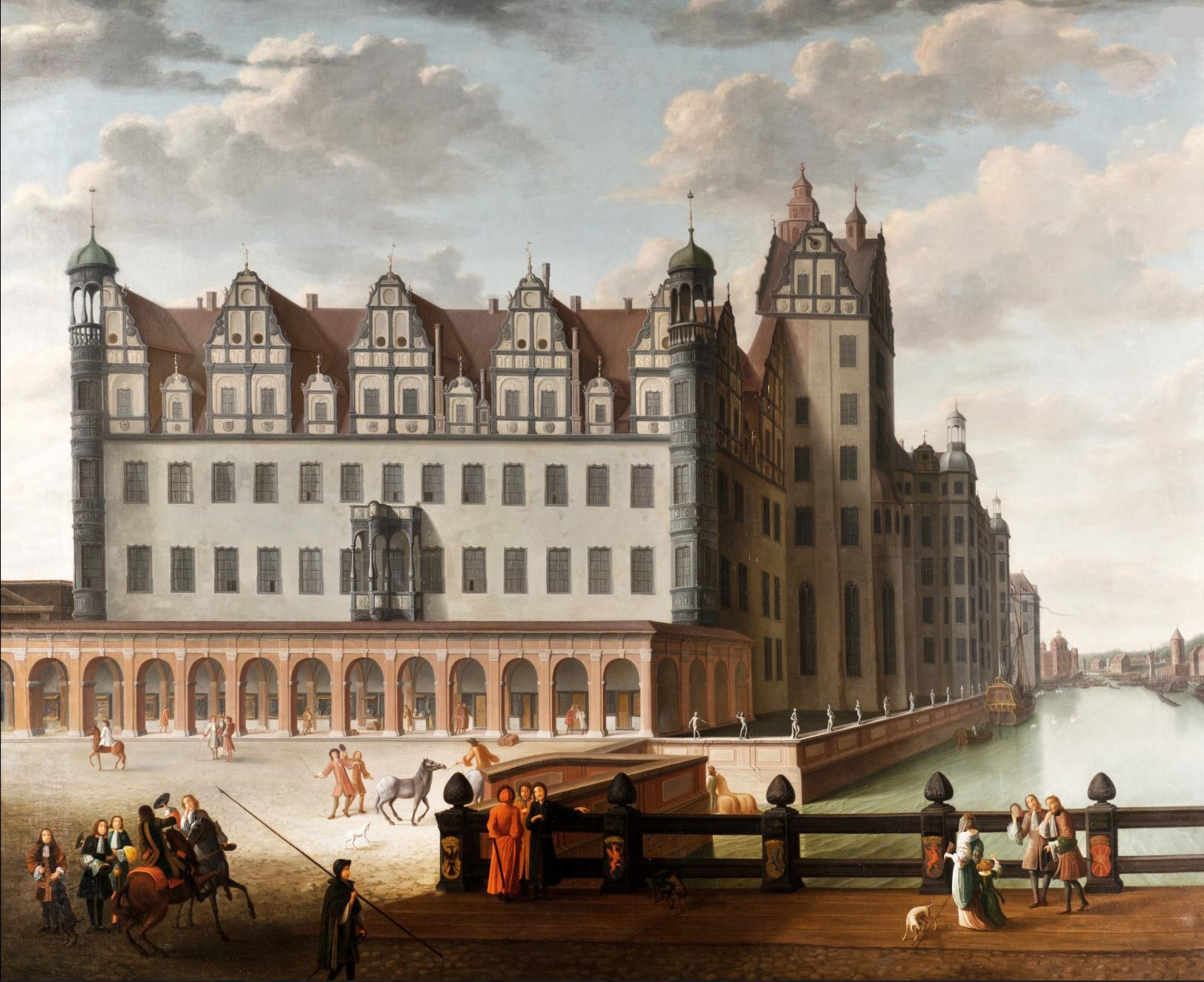
... during the Renaissance period

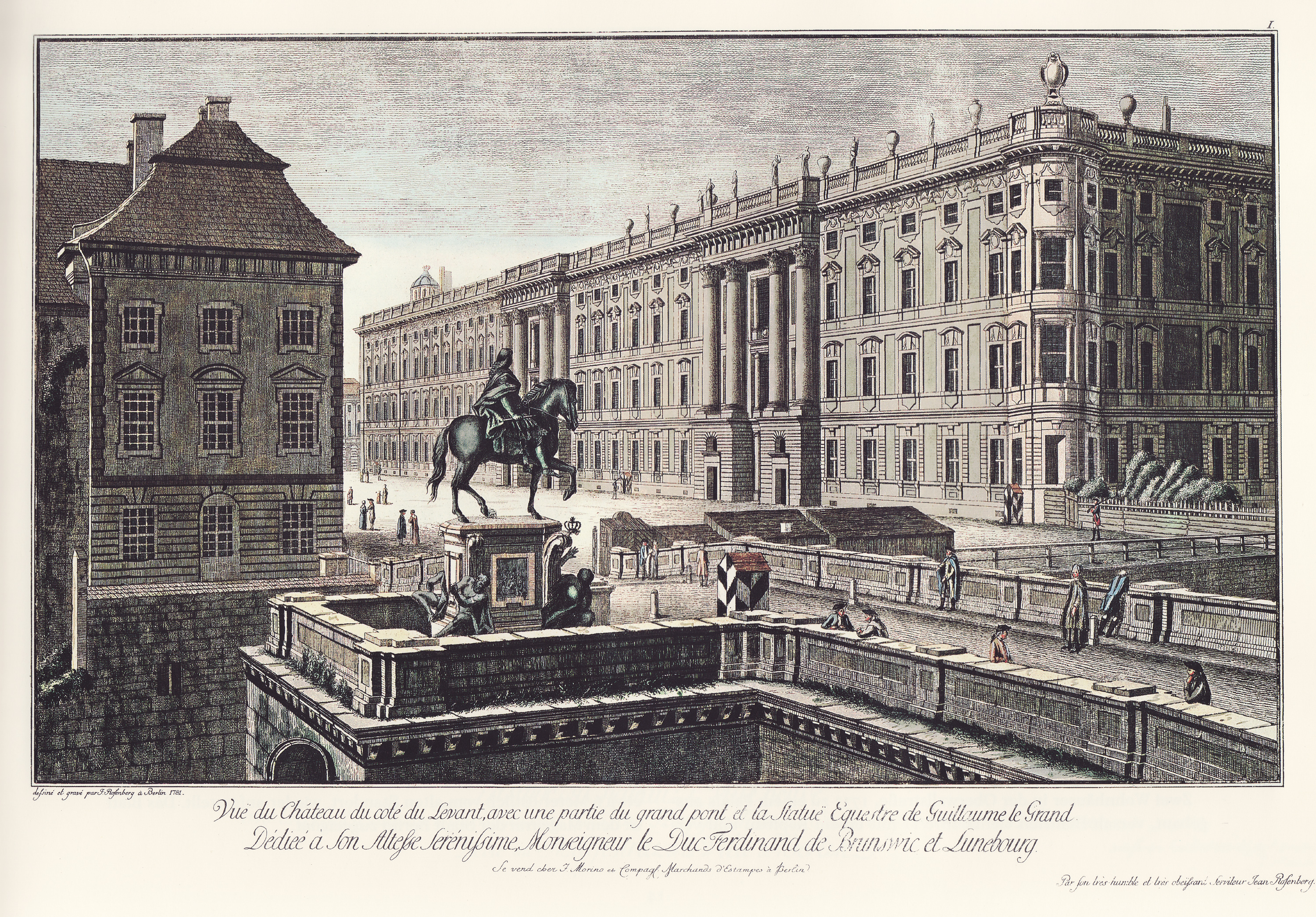
... according to the design of 1781

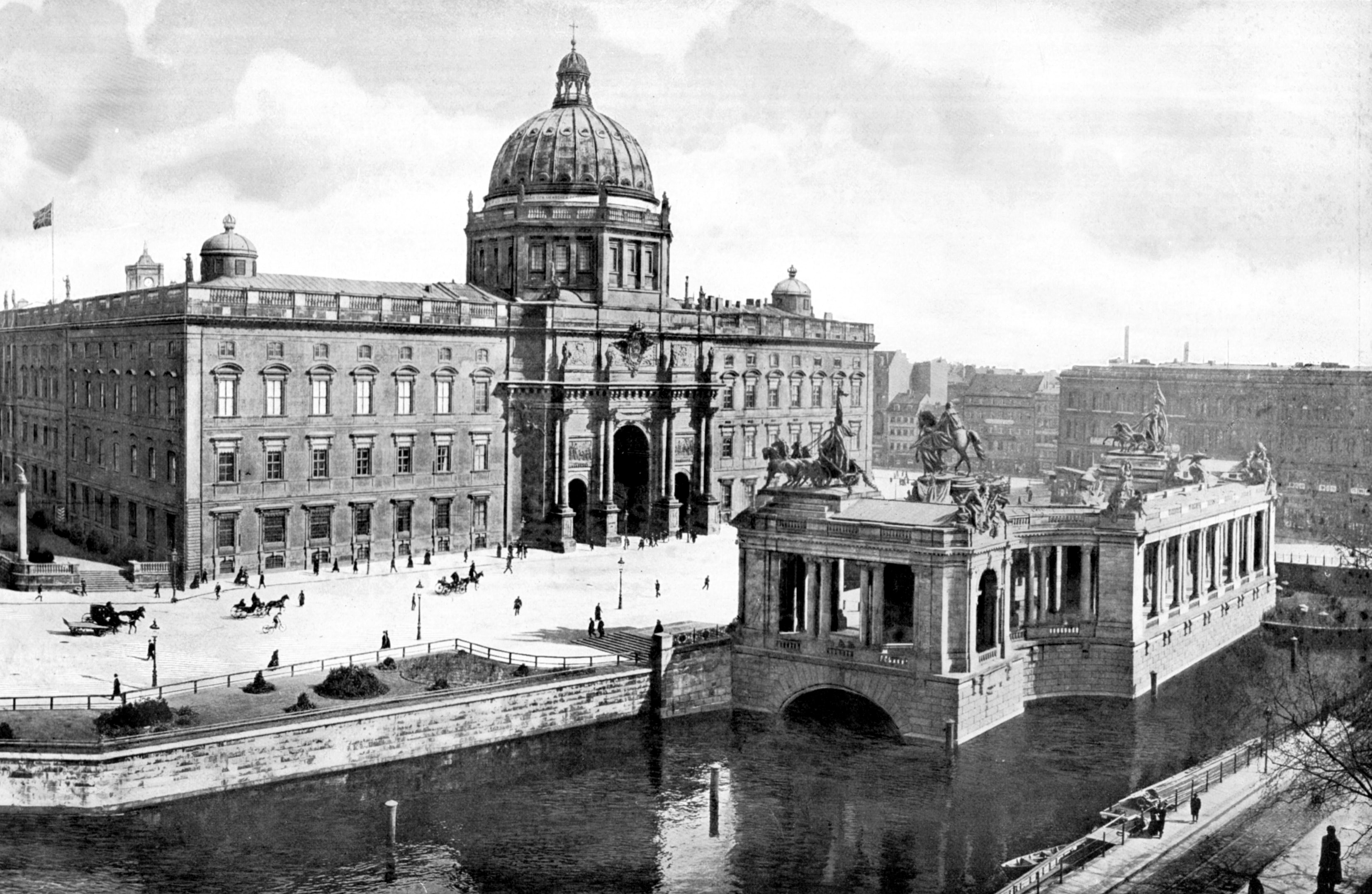
... according to the design of 1900

To reduce the influence of the estates, in 1604, Joachim Frederick created a council called Geheimer Rat für die Kurmark (Privy Council for the Electorate), which instead of the estates would function as the supreme advisory council for the elector. While the council was permanently established in 1613, it failed to gain any influence until 1651, owing to the Thirty Years' War (1618–1648)

Until after the Thirty Years' War, the various territories of Brandenburg-Prussia remained politically independent from each other, connected only by the common feudal superior. Frederick William (ruled 1640–1688), who envisioned the transformation of the personal union into a real union, started to centralise the Brandenburg-Prussian government with an attempt to establish the Geheimer Rat as a central authority for all territories in 1651, but this project proved unfeasible. Instead, the elector continued to appoint a governor (Kurfürstlicher Rat) for each territory, who in most cases was a member of the Geheimer Rat. The most powerful institution in the territories remained the governments of the estates (Landständische Regierung, named Oberratsstube in Prussia and Geheime Landesregierung in Mark and Cleves), which were the highest government agencies regarding jurisdiction, finances and administration. The elector attempted to balance the estates' governments by creating Amtskammer chambers to administer and coordinate the elector's domains, tax income and privileges. Such chambers were introduced in Brandenburg in 1652, in Cleves and Mark in 1653, in Pomerania in 1654, in Prussia in 1661 and in Magdeburg in 1680. Also in 1680, the Kreditwerk came under the aegis of the elector.

Frederick William I's excise tax (Akzise), which from 1667 replaced the property tax raised in Brandenburg for Brandenburg-Prussia's standing army with the estates' consent, was raised by the elector without consultation with the estates. The conclusion of the Second Northern War of 1655–1660 had strengthened the elector politically, enabling him to reform the constitution of Cleves and Mark in 1660 and 1661 to introduce officials loyal to him and independent of the local estates. In the Duchy of Prussia he confirmed the traditional privileges of the Prussian estates in 1663, but the latter accepted the caveat that these privileges were not to be used to interfere with the exertion of the elector's sovereignty. As in Brandenburg, Frederick William ignored the privilege of the Prussian estates to confirm or veto taxes raised by the elector: while in 1656, an Akzise was raised with the estates' consent, the elector by force collected taxes not approved by the Prussian estates for the first time in 1674. From 1704 the Prussian estates de facto relinquished their right to approve the elector's taxes while formally still entitled to do so. In 1682 the elector introduced an Akzise to Pomerania and in 1688 to Magdeburg, while in Cleves and Mark an Akzise was introduced only between 1716 and 1720. Owing to Frederick William I's reforms, the state income increased threefold during his reign, and the tax burden per subject reached a level twice as high as in France.

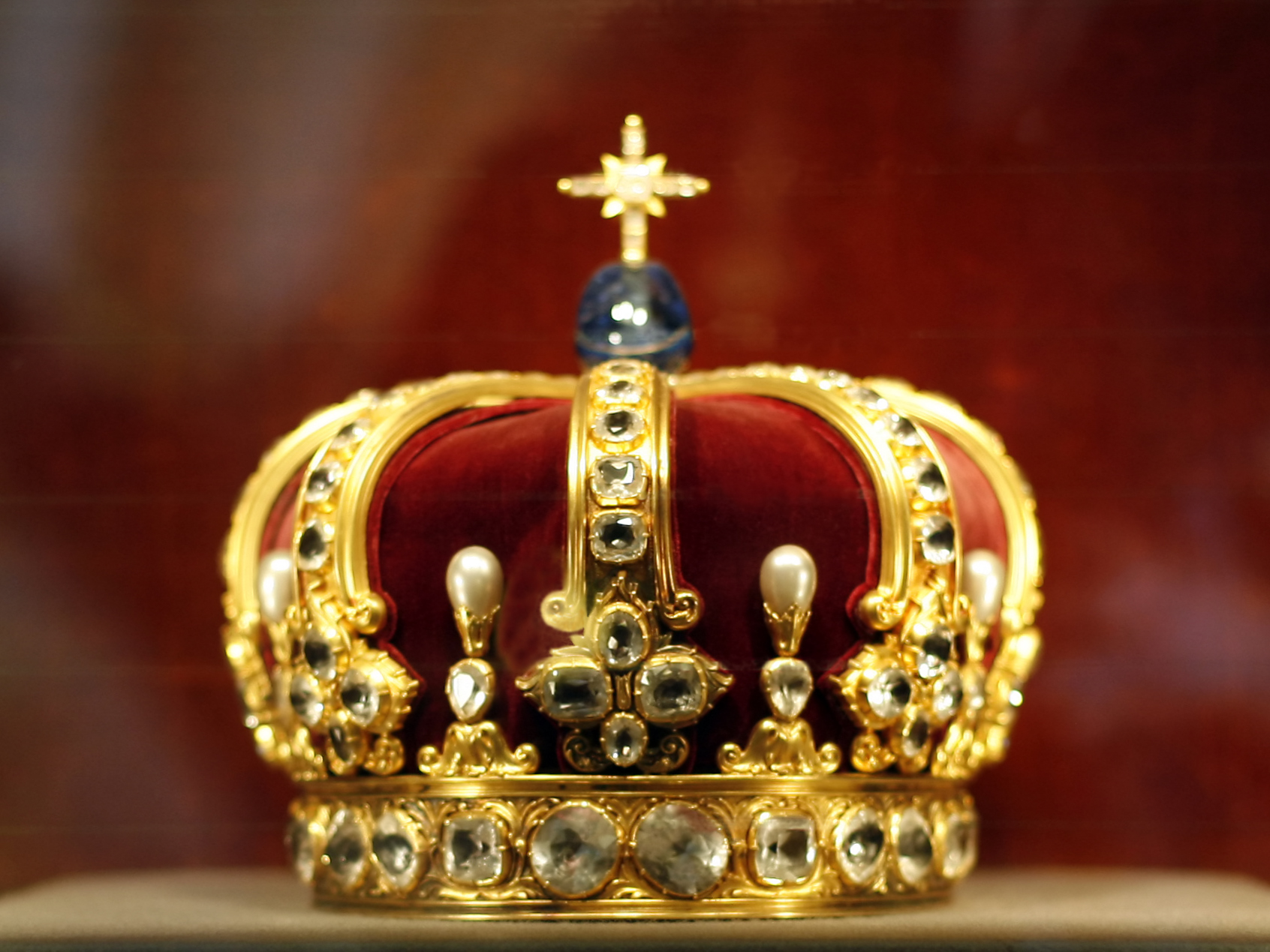
Prussian King's Crown (Hohenzollern Castle Collection)

Under the rule of Frederick III (I) (reign: 1688–1713), the Brandenburg Prussian territories were de facto reduced to provinces of the monarchy. Frederick William's testament would have divided Brandenburg-Prussia among his sons, but his firstborn son Frederick III (I), with the emperor's backing, succeeded in becoming the sole ruler based on the House Treaty of Gera of 1599, which forbade a division of Hohenzollern territories. In 1689, a new central chamber for all Brandenburg-Prussian territories was established, called Geheime Hofkammer (from 1713: Generalfinanzdirektorium). This chamber functioned as a superior agency of the territories' Amtskammer chambers. The General War Commissariat (Generalkriegskommissariat) emerged as a second central agency, superior to the local Kriegskommissariat agencies initially concerned with the administration of the army, but before 1712 transformed into an agency also concerned with general tax and police tasks.

The Kingdom of Prussia functioned as an absolute monarchy until the German revolutions of 1848–1849, after which Prussia became a constitutional monarchy and King Frederick William IV appointed Adolf Heinrich von Arnim-Boitzenburg Prussia's first prime minister (Ministerpräsident). Prussia's first constitution dated from 1848, but was only briefly in effect as it had been forced on the king. The 1850 Prussian Constitution established a two-chamber parliament. The lower house, the Prussian House of Representatives represented all taxpayers, who were divided into three classes according to the amount of taxes paid. This assured dominance by the more well-to-do elements of the population. The upper house (First Chamber or Erste Kammer), later renamed the Prussian House of Lords (Herrenhaus), was appointed by the king. He retained full executive authority and ministers were responsible only to him. As a result, the grip of the landowning classes, the Junkers, remained unbroken, especially in the eastern provinces. The Prussian Secret Police, formed in response to the German revolutions of 1848–1849, aided the conservative government.

=== Prussia inside Weimar Republic ===
Unlike its authoritarian pre-1918 predecessor, Prussia from 1918 to 1932 was a promising democracy within Germany. The abolition of the political power of the aristocracy transformed Prussia into a region strongly dominated by the left wing of the political spectrum, with "Red Berlin" and the industrial centre of the Ruhr Area exerting major influence. During this period a coalition of centre-left parties ruled, predominantly under the leadership (1920–1932) of East Prussian Social Democrat Otto Braun. While in office Braun implemented several reforms (together with his Minister of the Interior, Carl Severing) that became models for the later Federal Republic of Germany. For instance, a Prussian prime minister could only be forced out of office if there was a "positive majority" for a potential successor. This concept, known as the constructive vote of no confidence, became part of the Basic Law of the Federal Republic of Germany. Historians regard the Prussian government during the 1920s as far more successful than that of Germany as a whole.

Similar to other German states both now and at the time, executive power remained vested in a Minister-President of Prussia and in laws established by a Landtag elected by the people.

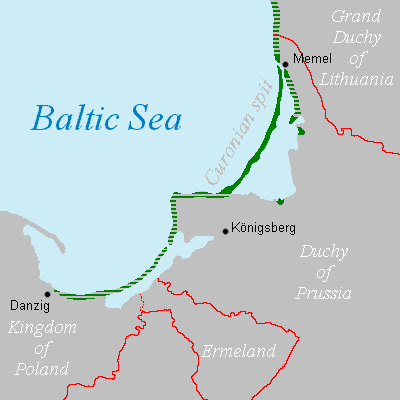
In 1649, Kursenieki settlements along the Baltic coastline of East Prussia spanned from Memel (Klaipėda) to Danzig (Gdańsk).

== Social history ==
=== Population ===
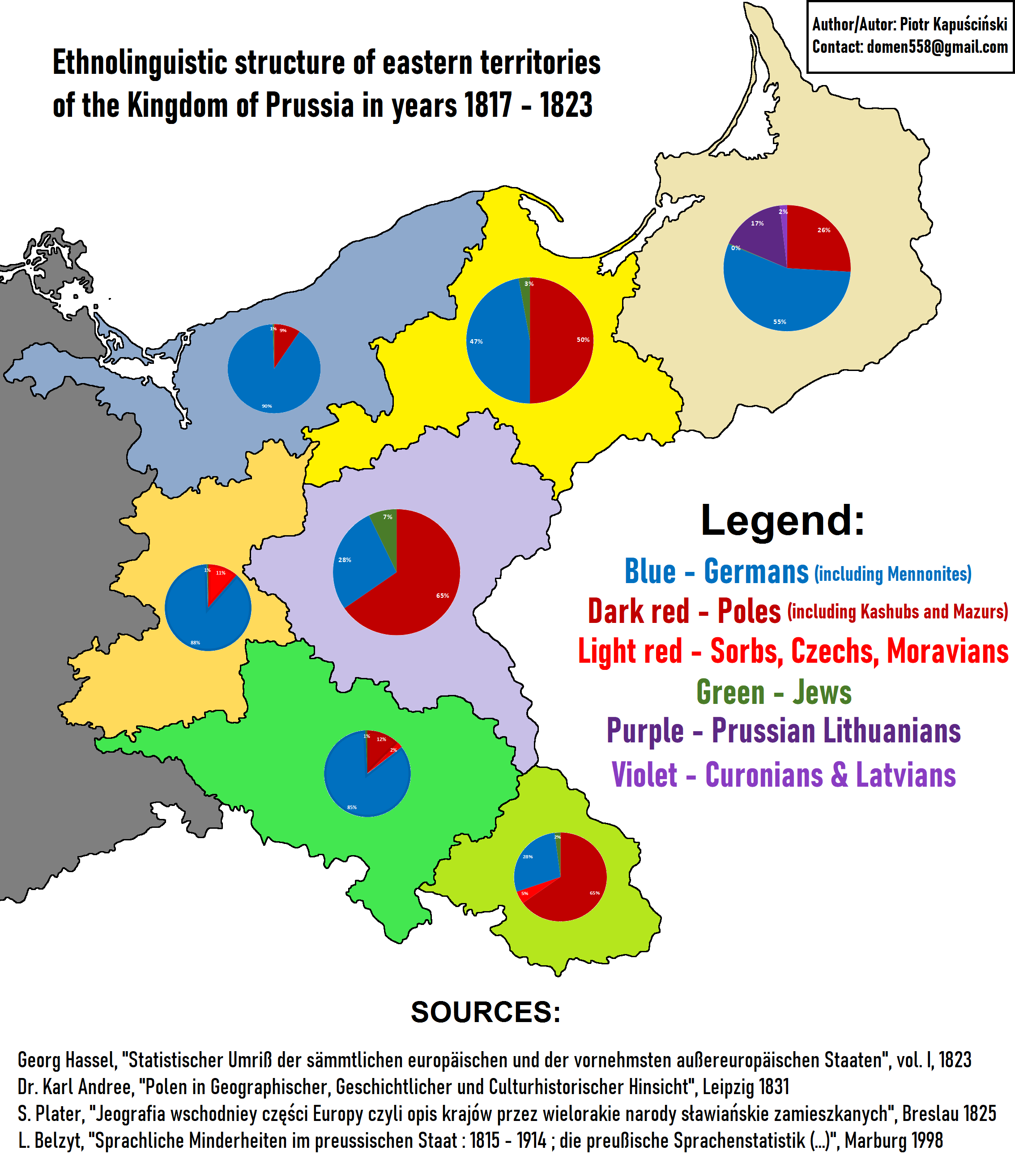
Ethnic structure of the eastern regions of Prussia between 1817 and 1823

In 1871, Prussia's population numbered 24.69 million, accounting for 60% of the German Empire's population. The population grew rapidly from 45 million in 1880 to 56 million in 1900, thanks to declining mortality, even as birth rates declined. About 6 million Germans, primarily young families, migrated to the United States, especially the mid-western farming regions. Their place in agriculture was often taken by young Polish farm workers. In addition, large numbers of Polish miners moved to Upper Silesia and many Germans and Poles moved to industrial jobs in the fast-growing cities especially in the Rhineland and Westphalia. In 1910, the population had increased to 40.17 million (62% of the Empire's population). In 1914, Prussia had an area of 354,490 km^{2}. In May 1939, Prussia had an area of 297,007 km^{2} and a population of 41,915,040 inhabitants.

=== Ethnicity ===
Apart from ethnic Germans the country was inhabited also by ethnolinguistic minorities such as Poles (including Kashubs in West Prussia and Mazurs in East Prussia), Prussian Lithuanians (in East Prussia), Sorbs (in Lusatia), Czechs and Moravians (in Silesia), Danes (in Schleswig), Jews, Frisians, Dutch, Walloons, Russians (in Wojnowo), French, Italians, Hungarians and others.

=== Religion ===
The Duchy of Prussia was the first state to officially adopt Lutheranism in 1525. In the wake of the Reformation, Prussia was dominated by two major Protestant confessions: Lutheranism and Calvinism. The majority of the Prussian population was Lutheran, although there were dispersed Calvinist minorities in central and western parts of the state especially Brandenburg, Rhineland, Westphalia and Hesse-Nassau. In 1613, John Sigismund, Elector of Brandenburg and Grand Duke of Prussia declared himself for the Calvinist creed and transferred the Berlin Cathedral from the Lutheran to the Calvinist church. Lutherans and Calvinist congregations all over the kingdom were merged in 1817 by the Prussian Union of churches, which came under tight royal control. In Protestant regions, writes Nipperdey:

Much of religious life was often conventional and superficial by any normal, human standard. The state and the bureaucracy kept their distance, preferring to spoon-feed the churches and treat them like children. They saw the churches as channels for education, as a means of instilling morality and obedience, or for propagating useful things, just like bee-keeping or potato-farming.

Prussia received significant Huguenot population after the issuing of the Edict of Fontainebleau by Louis XIV of France and the following dragonnades. Prussian monarchs, beginning with Frederick William, Elector of Brandenburg, opened the country to the fleeing French Calvinist refugees. In Berlin, they built and worshipped at their own church called the French Cathedral on Gendarmenmarkt. Time passed by, and the French Reformed assimilated into the wider Protestant community in Prussia. East Prussia's southern region of Masuria was mostly made up of Germanised Lutheran Masurians.

After 1814, Prussia contained millions of Catholics in the west and in the east. There were substantial populations in the Rhineland, parts of Westphalia, eastern parts of Silesia, West Prussia, Ermland and the Province of Posen. Communities in Poland were often ethnically Polish, although this is not the case of eastern Silesia as the majority of Catholics there were German. During the 19th-century Kulturkampf, Prussian Catholics were forbidden from fulfilling any official functions for the state and were largely distrusted.

Prussia contained a relatively large Jewish community, which was mostly concentrated in large urban areas. According to the 1880 census, it was the biggest one in Germany with 363,790 individuals.

In 1925, 64.9% of the Prussian population was Protestant, 31.3% was Catholic, 1.1% was Jewish, 2.7% was placed in other religious categories.

=== Non-German population ===
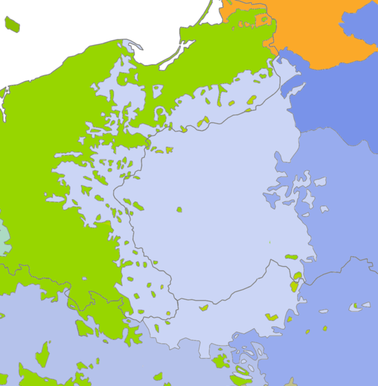
Polish language distribution (light blue) in 1910

In 1871, approximately 2.4 million Poles lived in Prussia, constituting the largest minority. Other minorities were Jews, Danes, Frisians, Dutchmen, Kashubians (72,500 in 1905), Masurians (248,000 in 1905), Lithuanians (101,500 in 1905), Walloons, Czechs, Kursenieki, and Sorbs.

The area of Greater Poland, where the Polish nation had originated, became the Province of Posen after the Partitions of Poland. Poles in this Polish-majority province (62% Polish, 38% German) resisted German rule. Also, the southeast portion of Silesia (Upper Silesia) had a Polish majority. But Catholics and Jews did not have equal status with Protestants.

As a result of the Treaty of Versailles in 1919, the Second Polish Republic was granted not only these two areas, but also areas with a German majority in the province of West Prussia. After World War II, East Prussia, most of Pomerania and Silesia, and the eastern part of Brandenburg were either annexed by the Soviet Union or given to Poland, and the German-speaking populations forcibly expelled.

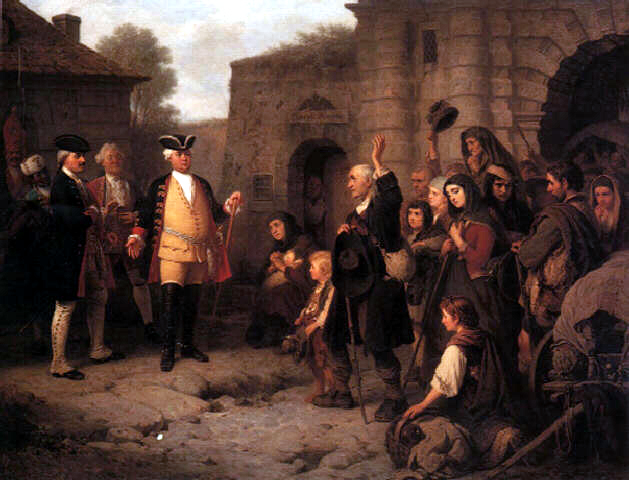
King Frederick William I of Prussia welcoming the expelled Salzburg Protestants

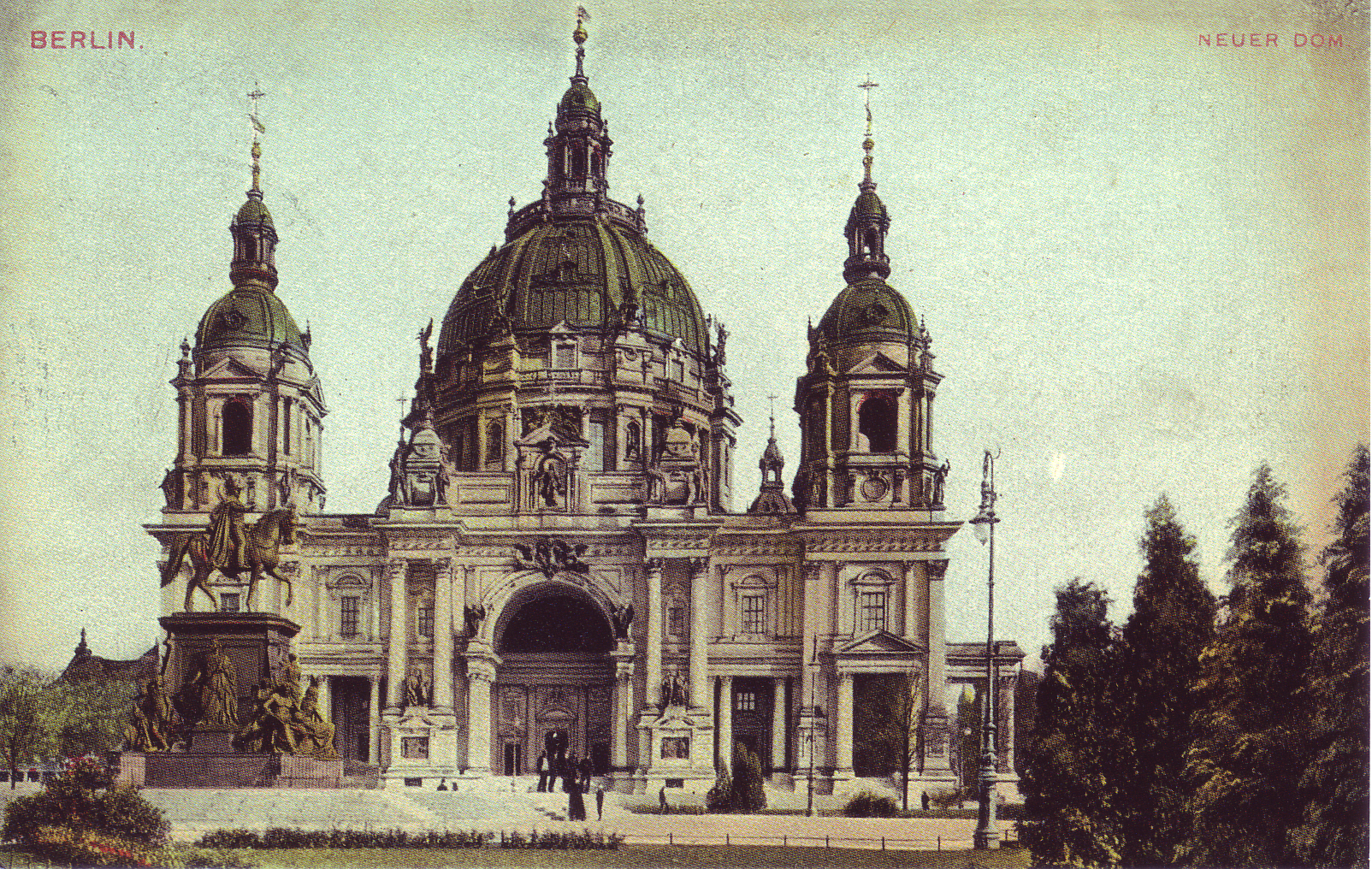
The Berlin Cathedral c. 1900

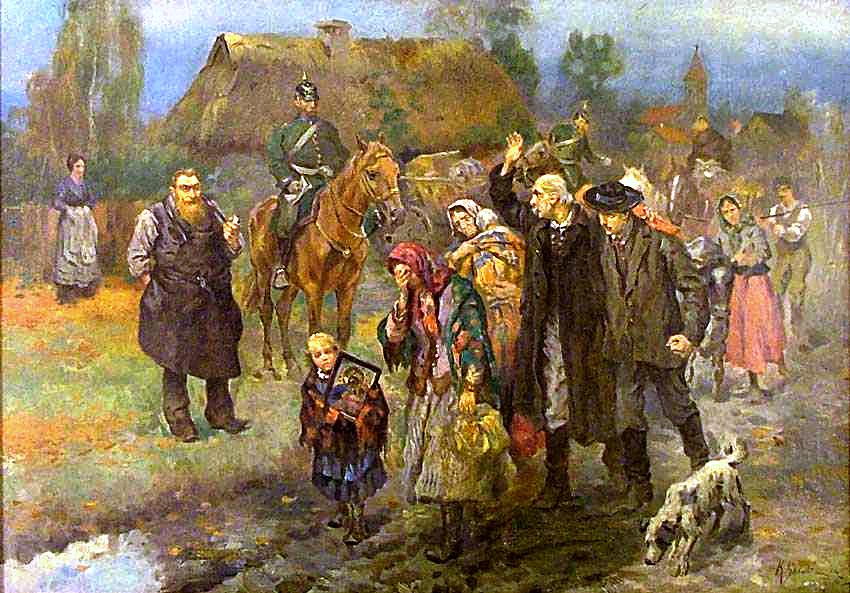
Prussian deportations (Polenausweisungen) were the mass expulsions of ethnic Poles between 1885 and 1890.

=== Education ===
The German states in the 19th century were world leaders in prestigious education and Prussia set the pace. For boys free public education was widely available, and the gymnasium system for elite students was highly professionalized. The modern university system emerged from the 19th century German universities, especially Friedrich Wilhelm University (now named Humboldt University of Berlin). It pioneered the model of the research university with well-defined career tracks for professors. The United States, for example, paid close attention to German models. Families focused on educating their sons. The traditional schooling for girls was generally provided by mothers and governesses. Elite families increasingly favoured Catholic convent boarding schools for their daughters. Prussia's Kulturkampf laws in the 1870s limited Catholic schools thus providing an opening for a large number of new private schools for girls.

== Continuation of Prussian traditions ==
The German states on the former territory of the Free State of Prussia are successor states to Prussia in legal terms, particularly in terms of constitutional and international law. For example, the state of North Rhine-Westphalia is bound to the concordat that the Free State of Prussia concluded with the Holy See.

Despite its dissolution in 1947, many aspects of Prussia have been preserved to this day in everyday life, in culture, in sport and even in names.

=== Federal government ===
- In the federal government according to the prevailing view, the Federal Republic of Germany as a subject of international law is identical to the federal state initiated and dominated by Prussia, which was founded in 1867 under the name of the North German Confederation and expanded into the German Empire in 1871.
- Prussia's capital Berlin also became the capital of the newly founded empire in 1871. The capital city resolution of 1991, which designated Berlin as the federal capital of the reunified Germany, the "Berlin Republic", stands in this tradition. Several federal institutions use buildings from former Prussian institutions, for example the Bundesrat uses the Prussian House of Lords building. The Federal President has his first official residence in Bellevue Palace, the first classical building in Prussia. As the central shield of the Reich coat of arms, the Prussian state coat of arms is depicted in the gable above the main entrance to the Reichstag building.
- The constructive vote of no confidence anchored in the Basic Law of the Federal Republic of Germany, which only allows the head of government to be voted out if a new successor is simultaneously elected, is directly based on a constitutional regulation of the Free State of Prussia.
- The Prussian war award of the Iron Cross is, in a modified form, the symbol of the Bundeswehr.
- In the tradition of the 1st Guards Regiment on Foot, which was introduced in 1806 as the personal regiment of the King of Prussia, the guard battalion at the Federal Ministry of Defence has followed.
- As part of state visits, the presentation march of Friedrich Wilhelm III is a regular part of the federal diplomatic protocol at the reception with military honors and the marching down the front of the guard battalion's honour formation at the Federal Ministry of Defence is played.
- The Bundeswehr's Great Tattoo, played particularly when bidding farewell to Federal Presidents, Chancellors, Federal Defence Ministers and senior military officers, is largely composed of traditional elements of Prussian military music.
- The police star, the emblem of the Federal Police and the Feldjäger of the Bundeswehr, is derived from the Prussian Guard Star, which went back to the eight-pointed breast star of the Black Eagle Order. The guard star can also be found on the bell trees of the Bundeswehr music corps.
- In 2002, the then Brandenburg Social Minister Alwin Ziel suggested naming the planned new federal state of Berlin-Brandenburg "Prussia".

=== Within Germany ===
- The state coat of arms of Saxony-Anhalt shows, among other things the Prussian eagle.
- The large coat of arms of Baden-Württemberg contains the house coat of arms of the Hohenzollerns.
- The Prussian government and administration model was decisive for a large number of political institutions at the state level and is still expressed today in terms such as Minister-president, Regierungsbezirk and Landrat. Today's North Rhine-Westphalia regional associations go back to the Prussian provincial associations.
- The Rhineland Regional Association in North Rhine-Westphalia - in continuation of the tradition of the Rhine Province and its provincial association - also has the Prussian eagle in the upper part of its association coat of arms.
- The states on the former territory of the Free State of Prussia are successor states to Prussia in legal terms, particularly in terms of constitutional and international law. North Rhine-Westphalia, the largest successor state to Prussia, maintains its Prussian history and remembrance culture in the form of the Prussian Museums in Wesel and Minden.

=== In churches ===
- The Union of Evangelical Churches emerged from the Evangelical Church of the Union, a church association of the Old Prussian Protestant regional churches, i.e. H. of the churches whose area already belonged to Prussia before 1866
- The Prussian state coat of arms is depicted in the niche above the main (west) door within Berlin Cathedral, relating to the link between church and state.

== See also ==
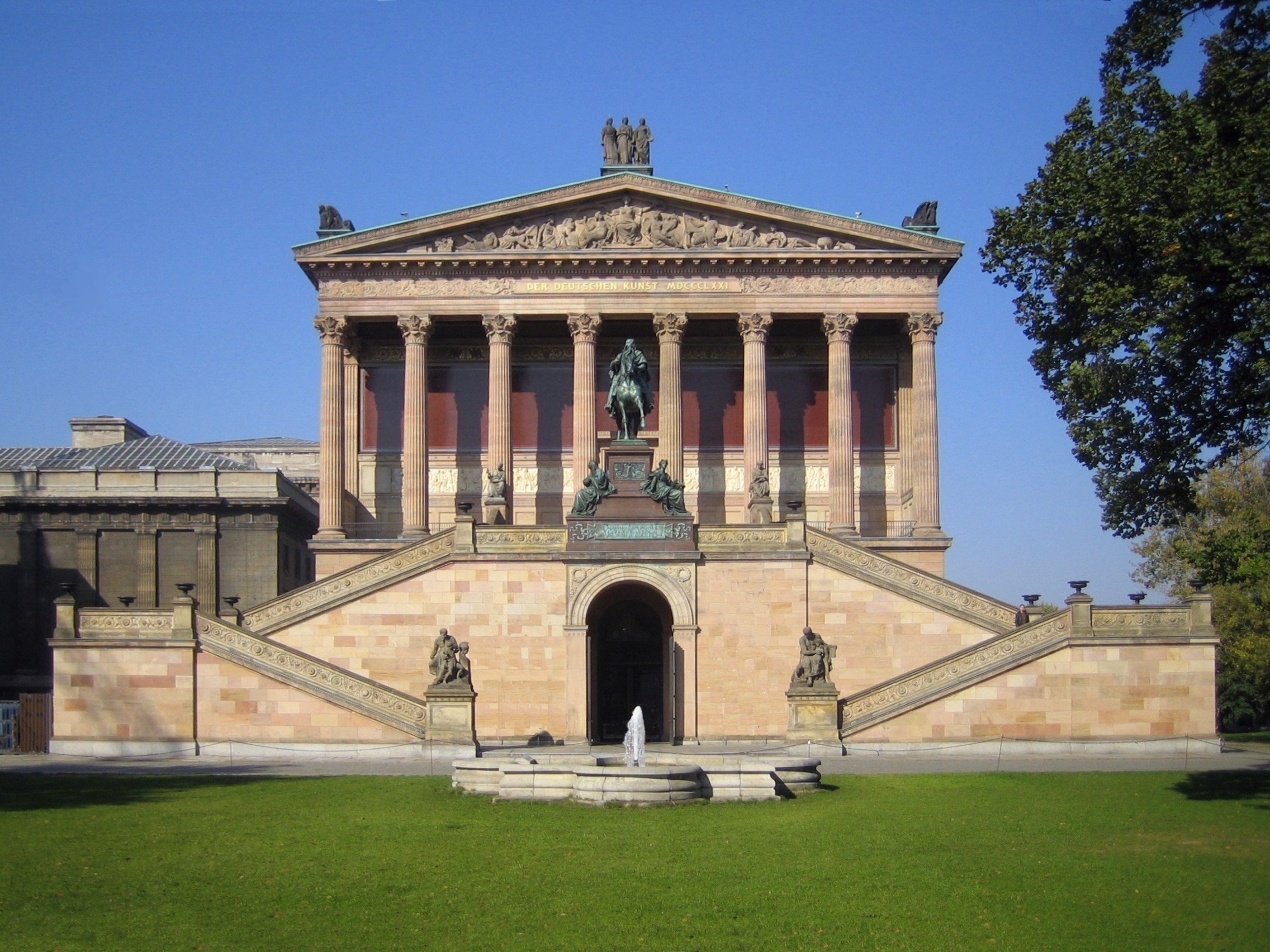
The Alte Nationalgalerie in Berlin

- Alte Nationalgalerie, Berlin
- Altes Museum, Berlin
- Bode Museum, Berlin
- East Prussian Regional Museum
- List of museums and galleries in Berlin
- List of museums in Germany
