= Borussia (anthem) =

Old Prussian national anthem

- by Gaspare Luigi Pacifico Spontini
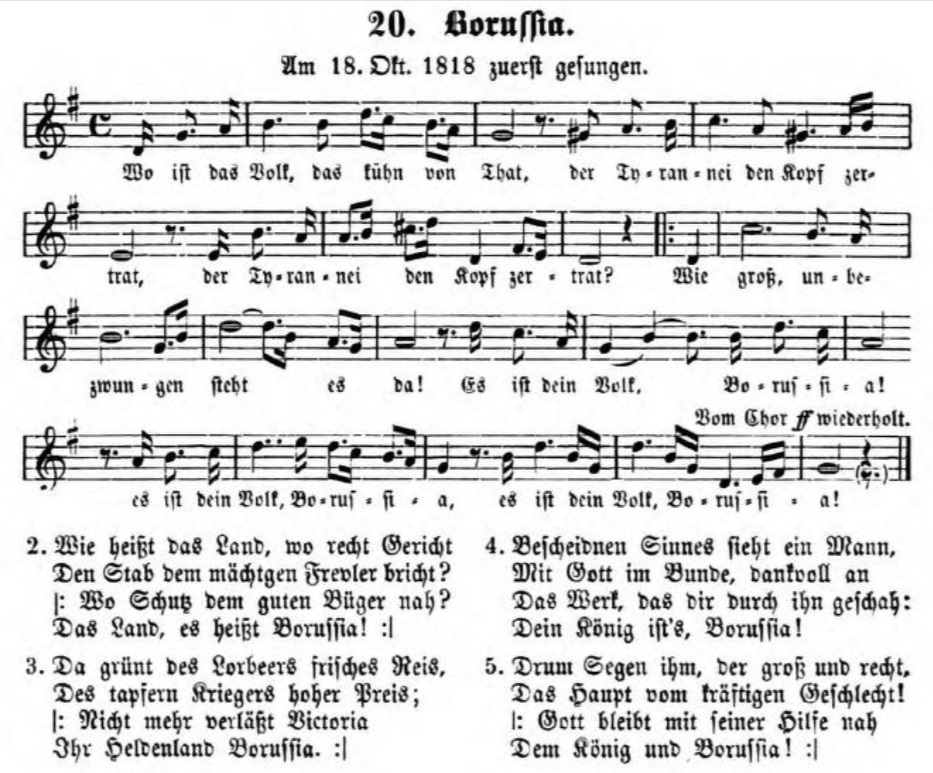
- Lyrics of Borussia written by Johann Friedrich Leopold Duncker

Melody

Borussia, also known as the Chant national prussien, is a patriotic song that temporarily held the status of Prussian national anthem. The melody is by Gaspare Luigi Pacifico Spontini, and the text by Johann Friedrich Leopold Duncker. Borussia is a neo-Latin term for Prussia and a female figure as Prussia's allegory in the song.

== History ==
In 1814, King Friedrich Wilhelm III met the Italian composer Gasparo Luigi Pacifico Spontini in Paris, whom he brought to Berlin in 1820 as a music director. One of Spontini's first Berlin works was the composition with the title Borussia. It had already been composed by him two years ago as Chant National Prussien. He instrumented it with 100 violins, 50 trumpets, twenty other wind instruments (e.g. Bassoon, clarinet, horn) and 130 voices along with a soprano solo. It incorporated the melody of the British anthem God Save the King. The text was written by Johann Friedrich Leopold Duncker the cabinet secretary of the king.

On August 3, 1820, on the occasion of the birthday of King Friedrich Wilhelm III, the performance of Borussia took place in the Berlin State Opera. Within the same year, it was decreed as a Prussian national anthem and was then on sung in all schools and patriotic festivities.

The anthem was later extended by four stanzas, Karl Alexander Herklots is considered the author. However, the stanzas never became popular. They can only be found printed by August Heinrich Hoffmann von Fallersleben.

While in the course of the founding of the German Empire on 18 January, 1871, in August of the same year, a performance in the Berlin State Opera, an attempt was made to revive Borussia with changed text - instead of Borussia now Germania and instead of King now Kaiser - but without success.

== Text ==
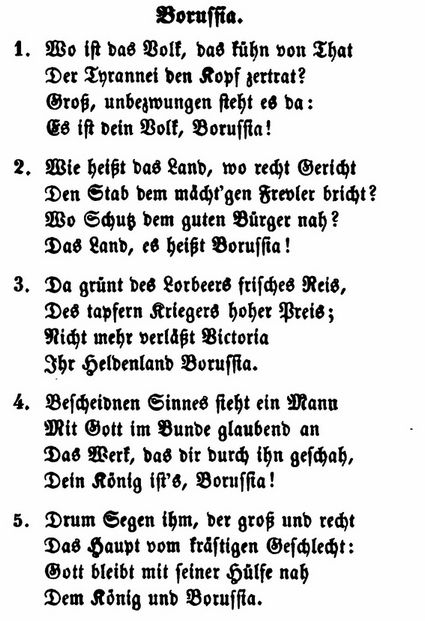
Borussia, print about 1850

German original

1. Wo ist das Volk, das kühn von That
Der Tyrannei den Kopf zertrat?
Groß, unbezwungen steht es da:
Es ist dein Volk, Borussia!

2. Wie heißt das Land, wo recht Gericht
Den Stab dem mächt’gen Frevler bricht?
Wo Schutz dem guten Bürger nah?
Das Land, es heißt Borussia!

3. Da grünt des Lorbeers frisches Reis,
Des tapfern Kriegers hoher Preis;
Nicht mehr verläßt Victoria
Ihr Heldenland Borussia.

4. Bescheidnen Sinnes sieht ein Mann
Mit Gott im Bunde glaubend an
Das Werk, das dir durch ihn geschah,
Dein König ist’s, Borussia!

5. Drum Segen ihm, der groß und recht
Das Haupt vom kräftigen Geschlecht:
Gott bleibt mit seiner Hülfe nah
Dem König und Borussia.

Literal translation

1. Where is the people that bold in deeds
crushed the head of tyranny?
It stands tall, unconquered:
It's your people, Borussia!

2. Which is the country where right jurisdiction
breaks the stick of the mighty wicked -
where protection is close to the good citizen?
The country is called Borussia!

3. There, fresh branches sprout from the laurel,
the brave warrior's high reward;
Victoria will never leave
her heroic country, Borussia.

4. With modesty, a man regards
in alliance with God and faithfully
the work that was done to you through him:
It's your king, Borussia!

5. Blessing over him therefore,
who is great and righteous,
the head of the strong dynasty:
God with his help remains close
to the king and Borussia.

== Literature ==
- Emil Bohn: Die Nationalhymnen der europäischen Völker. In: 4. Heft der Reihe Wort und Brauch. Volkskundliche Arbeiten namens der Schlesischen Gesellschaft für Volkskunde. In zwanglosen Heften herausgegeben von Dr. Theodor Siebs, ord. Professor a. d. Universität Breslau und Dr. Max Hippe, Stadtbibliothekar in Breslau. Verlag von M. & H. Marcus, Breslau 1908.
- Franz Magnus Böhme (Hrsg.): Volksthümliche Lieder der Deutschen im 18. und 19. Jahrhundert nach Wort und Weise aus alten Drucken und Handschriften, sowie aus Volksmund zusammengebracht. Breitkopf und Härtel, Leipzig 1895.

== See also ==
- Preußenlied
