= Preußenlied =

National anthem of Prussia from 1830 to 1840

English: Song of Prussia
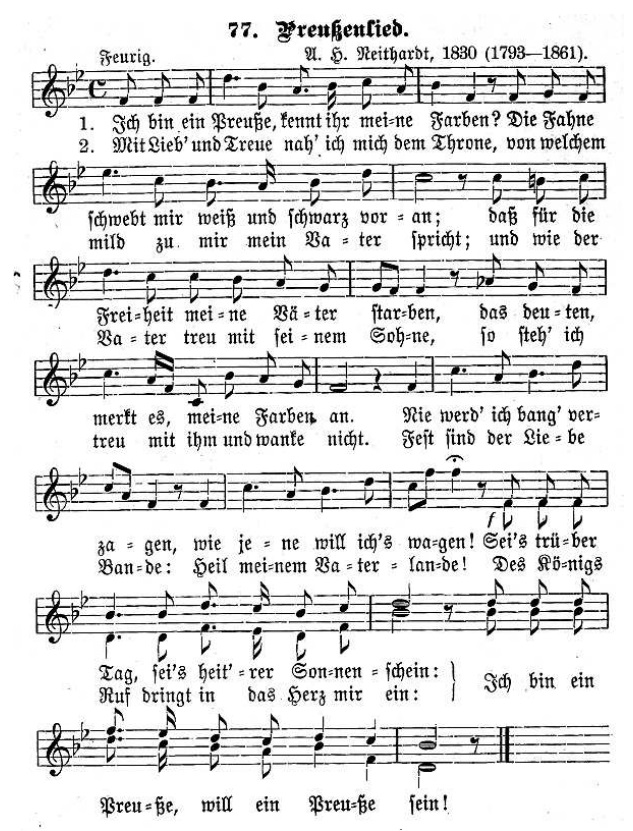
- Music sheet
- Former national anthem of Prussia
- Lyrics: Bernard Thiersch, 1830
- Music: August Neithardt, 1832
- Adopted: 1830
- Relinquished: 1840
- Preceded by: Borussia
- Succeeded by: Heil dir im Siegerkranz

Audio sample
- Preußenlied (instrumental): file; help

The "Preußenlied" ("Song of Prussia," in German) served as the national anthem of the Kingdom of Prussia, from 1830 to 1840. Because of its opening lyrics, it has also been known as "Ich bin ein Preuße, kennt ihr meine Farben?" ("I am a Prussian, know ye my colours?").

== History ==
Bernard Thiersch (1793–1855), the director of a Dortmund gymnasium, wrote the first six verses of the song in Halberstadt to honor the birthday of King Frederick William III of Prussia in 1830. The melody was composed in 1832 by August Neithardt (1793–1861), the Royal Music Director of the 2nd Garde-Grenadier-Regiment of the Prussian Army. The sixth verse alluded to the 1848 Battle of Dybbøl during the First Schleswig War. Dr. F. Th. Schneider added the seventh verse in 1851.

The "Preußenlied" replaced the previous anthem, "Borussia", and was then succeeded by "Heil dir im Siegerkranz".

Because almost all Germans east of the Oder were expelled after World War II, "Preußenlied" is sometimes sung by refugee organizations, such as the Territorial Association of East Prussia. It almost always has nationalistic undertones.

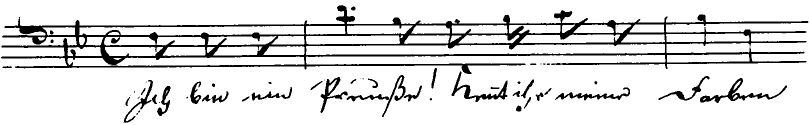

== Lyrics ==
1. Ich bin ein Preuße, kennt ihr meine Farben?
Die Fahne schwebt mir weiß und schwarz voran;
daß für die Freiheit meine Väter starben,
das deuten, merkt es, meine Farben an.
Nie werd ich bang verzagen,
wie jene will ich's wagen
sei's trüber Tag, sei's heitrer Sonnenschein,
ich bin ein Preuße, will ein Preuße sein.

2. Mit Lieb und Treue nah ich mich dem Throne,
von welchem mild zu mir ein Vater spricht;
und wie der Vater treu mit seinem Sohne,
so steh ich treu mit ihm und wanke nicht.
Fest sind der Liebe Bande,
Heil meinem Vaterlande!
Des Königs Ruf dring in das Herz mir ein:
Ich bin ein Preuße, will ein Preuße sein.

3. Nicht jeder Tag kann glühn im Sonnenlichte;
ein Wölkchen und ein Schauer kommt zur Zeit.
Drum lese keiner mir es im Gesichte,
daß nicht der Wünsche jeder mir gedeiht.
Wohl tauschten nah und ferne
mit mir gar viele gerne;
ihr Glück ist Trug und ihre Freiheit Schein:
Ich bin ein Preuße, will ein Preuße sein.

4. Und wenn der böse Sturm mich wild umsauset,
die Nacht entbrennet in des Blitzes Glut,
hat's doch schon ärger in der Welt gebrauset,
und was nicht bebte, war des Preußen Mut.
Mag Fels und Eiche splittern,
ich werde nicht erzittern;
Es stürm, es krach, es blitze wild darein:
Ich bin ein Preuße, will ein Preuße sein.

5. Wo Lieb und Treu sich um den König reihen,
wo Fürst und Volk sich reichen so die Hand,
da muß des Volkes wahres Glück gedeihen,
da blüht und wächst das schöne Vaterland.
So schwören wir aufs neue
dem König Lieb und Treue!
Fest sei der Bund! Ja schlaget mutig ein:
Wir sind ja Preußen, laßt uns Preußen sein.

6. Und wir, die wir am Ost- und Nordseestrande,
als Wacht gestellt, gestählt von Wog' und Wind,
wir, die seit Düppel durch des Blutes Bande
an Preußens Thron und Volk gekettet sind,
wir woll'n nicht rückwärts schauen,
nein, vorwärts mit Vertrauen!
Wir rufen laut in alle Welt hinein:
Auch wir sind Preußen, wollen Preußen sein!

7. Des Preußen Stern soll weithin hell erglänzen,
des Preußen Adler schweben wolkenan,
des Preußen Fahne frischer Lorbeer kränzen,
des Preußen Schwert zum Siege brechen Bahn.
Und hoch auf Preußens Throne
im Glanz von Friedrichs Krone
beherrsche uns ein König stark und mild,
und jedes Preußen Brust sei ihm ein Schild!

Translation:

1. I am a Prussian, know ye my colours?
The flag floats white and black before me;
for freedom's sake my fathers died,
to that, to know it, point my colours.
Never will I trembling quail;
as they did, will I dare.
Be it a rainy day, be it cheerful sunshine,
I am a Prussian, want nothing but to be a Prussian.

2. With affection and loyalty I approach the throne,
from which gently a father talks to me;
and as the father is faithful to his son,
so will I be faithful to him and falter not.
The bonds of affection are firm.
Hail my fatherland!
The king's call penetrates my heart so deep;
I am a Prussian, want nothing but to be a Prussian.

3. Not every day may gleam with sunshine;
from time to time a cloud and shower nears.
But may never anybody read in my face
that all my wishes are not satisfied.
Although near and far
very many would like to change places with me,
their happiness is deceit and their freedom is illusion;
I am a Prussian, want nothing but to be a Prussian.

4. At times the evil storm roars around me,
the night burns in lightning's blaze;
even so, it has stormed worse in the world already,
and what didn't tremble was the Prussian courage.
May rock and oak tree shatter,
I will not tremble.
May it storm, may it thunder, may lightning strike wildly;
I am a Prussian, want nothing but to be a Prussian.

5. Where love and faithfulness devote themselves to the king in such way,
where king and people give each other their hand,
there has to prosper the people's true happiness,
there blooms and prospers the beautiful fatherland.
And thus we swear anew:
Love and loyalty to the king!
Firm be that bond! Yes, bravely keep the bond;
For we are Prussians, let's be Prussians.

6. And we, who on the Baltic and North Sea shores,
were standing as guard, hardened by wave and wind,
we, who are since Düppel by a bond of blood
chained to Prussia's throne and people,
we will not backwards look,
no, forward with confidence!
We call forth to all the world about us
really we're Prussians, will be Prussians!

7. The Prussian's star can shine over a large distance brightly,
the Prussian's eagle can fly ahead of the clouds,
the Prussian standard is fresher than a sassafras wreath,
the Prussian sword to victories crushes a path.
And high on Prussia's throne
in the lustre of Frederick's crown
rule us our king, strong and mild,
and every Prussian chest be to him a sword!
