= Laurentia (disambiguation) =

Laurentia may refer to:

Geography

- Laurentia, the continental craton at the heart of North America
  - Laurentia, a former continent
- North America, the continent
- Laurentian Shield, the shield at the heart of the craton
- Laurentian Mountains
- Saint Lawrence River basin
- Laurentia (bioregion)
- Laurentia, a proposed deep-water container terminal at the Port of Quebec
- Laurentie (concept), a poetic name given to Quebec, and a name for the idea of an independent Quebec, from the 1930s to the 1950s

Media

- Laurentie (magazine), a magazine of the Alliance laurentienne, a Quebec independence organization in the 1950s
- Laurentia (film), also known as Laurentie, a film directed by Mathieu Denis

People

- surname "Laurentia", see Laurentius
- Saint Laurentia, see Palatias and Laurentia
- Pierre-Sébastien Laurentie

Biology

- Laurentia (moth), a moth genus of the family Pyralidae
- Doxocopa laurentia, a butterfly of the family Nymphalidae
- Amaxia laurentia, a moth of the subfamily Arctiinae
- Palmerella or Laurentia, a genus of flower in the family Campanulaceae
- Isotoma axillaris, a blue-flowered herbaceous perennial sometimes called 'laurentia'

Other

- 162 Laurentia, asteroid
- USS Laurentia (AF-44), US Navy World War II stores ship

== See also ==
- Laurentian (disambiguation)
