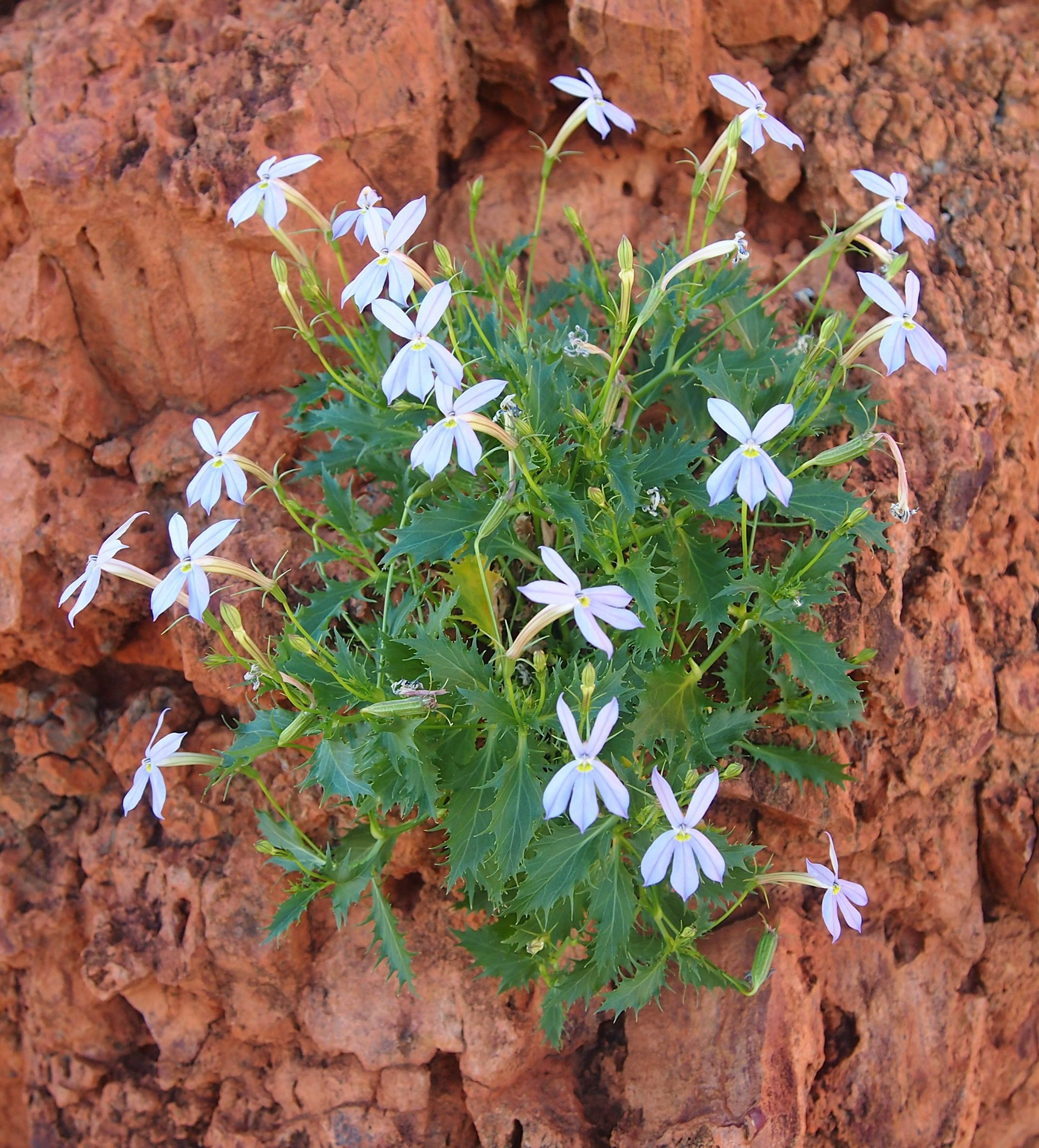
- Lithotoma petraea

Scientific classification
- Kingdom: Plantae
- Clade: Tracheophytes
- Clade: Angiosperms
- Clade: Eudicots
- Clade: Asterids
- Order: Asterales
- Family: Campanulaceae
- Genus: Lithotoma; E.B.Knox

= Lithotoma =

Genus of flowering plants

Lithotoma is a genus of flowering plants in the family Campanulaceae. It includes three species endemic to Australia.

- Lithotoma anethifolia (Summerh.) E.B.Knox
- Lithotoma axillaris (Lindl.) E.B.Knox
- Lithotoma petraea (F.Muell.) E.B.Knox
