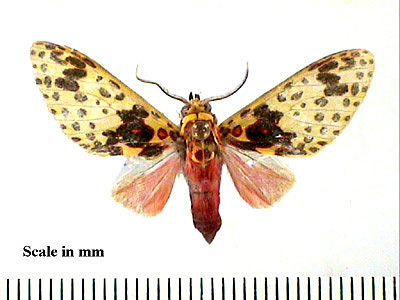
- Amaxia osmophora

Scientific classification
- Kingdom: Animalia
- Phylum: Arthropoda
- Class: Insecta
- Order: Lepidoptera
- Superfamily: Noctuoidea
- Family: Erebidae
- Subfamily: Arctiinae
- Tribe: Arctiini
- Subtribe: Phaegopterina
- Genus: Amaxia; Walker, 1855

Synonyms
- Neaxia Hampson, 1901

= Amaxia =

Genus of moths

Amaxia is a genus of moths in the family Erebidae erected by Francis Walker in 1855. The type species of the genus is Amaxia pardalis Walker, 1855.

== Species ==
- Amaxia apyga Hampson, 1901
- Amaxia beata Dognin, 1909
- Amaxia bella Schaus, 1905
- Amaxia carinosa Schaus, 1920
- Amaxia chaon Druce, 1883
- Amaxia collaris E. D. Jones, 1912
- Amaxia consistens Schaus, 1905
- Amaxia corata Schaus, 1921
- Amaxia disconsistens Dognin, 1923
- Amaxia duchatae Toulgoët, 1987
- Amaxia egaensis Seitz, 1921
- Amaxia elongata Toulgoët, 1987
- Amaxia erythrophleps Hampson, 1901
- Amaxia fallaciosa Toulgoët, 1989
- Amaxia fallax Toulgoët, 1998
- Amaxia flavicollis Rothschild, 1909
- Amaxia flavipuncta Hampson, 1904
- Amaxia gnosia Schaus, 1905
- Amaxia hebe Schaus, 1892
- Amaxia inopinata Toulgoët, 1989
- Amaxia juvenis Schaus, 1896
- Amaxia kennedyi Rothschild, 1909
- Amaxia klagesi Rothschild, 1909
- Amaxia laurentia Schaus, 1905
- Amaxia lepida Schaus, 1912
- Amaxia manora Druce, 1906
- Amaxia ockendeni Rothschild, 1909
- Amaxia ornata Toulgoët, 1989
- Amaxia pandama Druce, 1893
- Amaxia pardalis Walker, 1855
- Amaxia perapyga Rothschild, 1922
- Amaxia peruana Rothschild, 1916
- Amaxia pseudamaxia Rothschild, 1917
- Amaxia pseudodyuna Rothschild, 1922
- Amaxia pulchra Rothschild, 1909
- Amaxia punctata Rothschild, 1909
- Amaxia pyga Schaus, 1892
- Amaxia reticulata Rothschild, 1909
- Amaxia theon Druce, 1900
- Amaxia tierna Schaus, 1920
- Amaxia violacea Reich, 1933
