= Margaret Byrne =

Australian geneticist

Margaret Mary Byrne
- Born: 1960; England
- Education: The University of Western Australia
- Scientific career
- Thesis: Genetic diversity in Isotoma petraea and Macrozamia riedlei.

Margaret Mary Byrne is senior principal research scientist and director of the Science Division within WA Dept of Parks and Wildlife. She is a member of the Board of Terrestrial Ecosystem Research Network (TERN). Her research background is in population genetics and conservation genetics, with applications to choosing provenances for restoration as well as to understanding phylogeographic history. She has been a longstanding treasurer of Genetics Society of Australia, a society relevant to NCEEC.

== Education and early career ==
Byrne completed her Bachelor of Science with First Class Honours at The University of Western Australia, in 1986, completing her Honours thesis on Molecular Biological Techniques for the Study of Plant Genetic Systems. She went on to complete her doctorate at the same university in 1991, on Genetic diversity in Isotoma petraea and Macrozamia riedlei. After completing her doctorate, she went on to work as a researcher with the CSIRO Division of Forestry, where she undertook genetic mapping and quantitative trait locus (QTL) analysis in eucalypts.

== Work in conservation ==
In 1996 she returned to Perth to establish a molecular genetics laboratory in the then Department of Conservation and Land Management. Her research has focussed on plant genetic research to inform conservation strategies for rare and threatened plants, as well as biodiversity conservation at community and landscape scales in relation to remnant viability and revegetation.
