= Blue star creeper =

Blue star creeper may refer to the following plants in the family Campanulaceae native to Australia:

- Lobelia pedunculata, aka Pratia pedunculata, also commonly known as matted pratia and trailing pratia
- Isotoma fluviatilis, aka Laurentia fluviatilis, also commonly known as swamp isotome
