= Amaxia pardalis =

Scientific classification
- Kingdom: Animalia
- Phylum: Arthropoda
- Class: Insecta
- Order: Lepidoptera
- Superfamily: Noctuoidea
- Family: Erebidae
- Subfamily: Arctiinae
- Genus: Amaxia
- Species: A. pardalis

Binomial name
- Amaxia pardalis Walker, 1855

Synonyms
- Amaxia osmophora Hampson, 1901; Amaxia dyuna Druce, 1897; Amaxia parva Rothschild, 1909

Species of moth

Amaxia pardalis is a moth of the family Erebidae. It was described by Francis Walker in 1855 and is the type species of the genus Amaxia. It is found in Brazil, Suriname, Costa Rica and Mexico.

== Subspecies ==
- Amaxia pardalis pardalis
- Amaxia pardalis osmophora Hampson, 1901 (Costa Rica)
- Amaxia pardalis parva Rothschild, 1909 (Surinam, Brazil)
