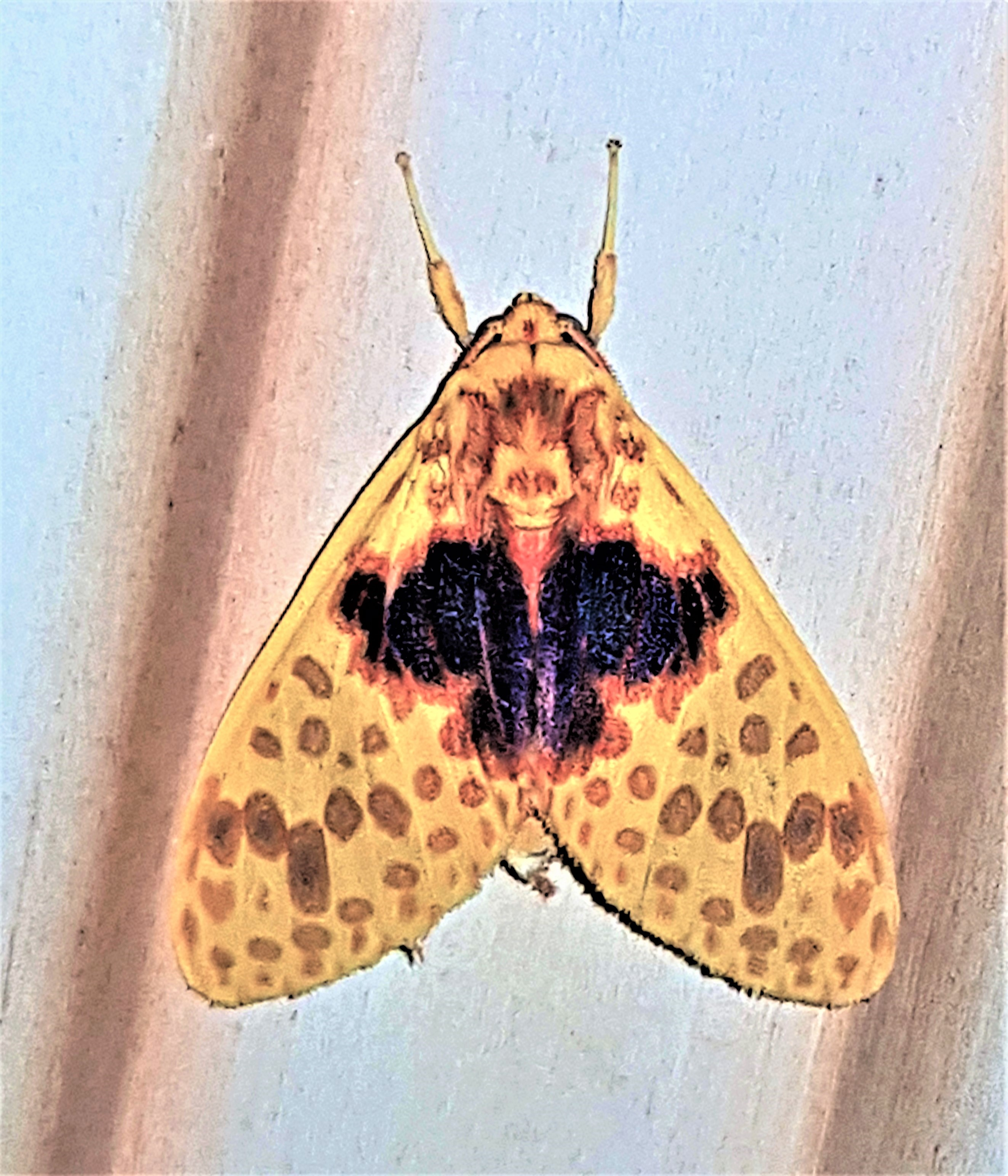
- Adult

Scientific classification
- Kingdom: Animalia
- Phylum: Arthropoda
- Class: Insecta
- Order: Lepidoptera
- Superfamily: Noctuoidea
- Family: Erebidae
- Subfamily: Arctiinae
- Genus: Amaxia
- Species: A. pulchra

Binomial name
- Amaxia pulchra Rothschild, 1909

= Amaxia pulchra =

Species of moth

Amaxia pulchra is a moth of the family Erebidae. It was described by Walter Rothschild in 1909. It is found in Peru and Suriname.
