= Amaxia klagesi =

Scientific classification
- Domain: Eukaryota
- Kingdom: Animalia
- Phylum: Arthropoda
- Class: Insecta
- Order: Lepidoptera
- Superfamily: Noctuoidea
- Family: Erebidae
- Subfamily: Arctiinae
- Genus: Amaxia
- Species: A. klagesi

Binomial name
- Amaxia klagesi (Rothschild, 1909)

Synonyms
- Neaxia klagesi Rothschild, 1909

Species of moth

Amaxia klagesi is a moth of the family Erebidae. It was described by Walter Rothschild in 1909. It is found in Suriname.
