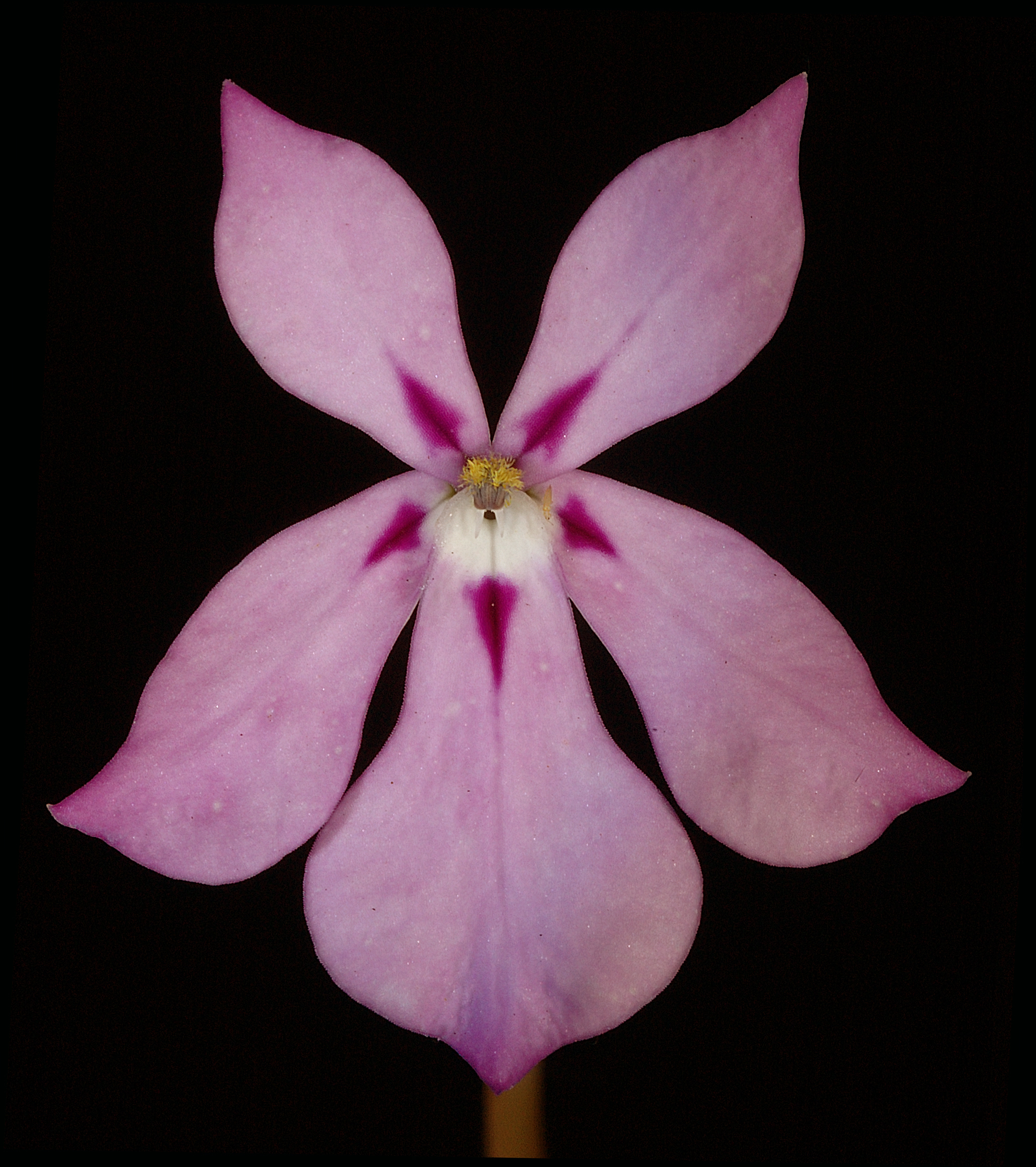

Scientific classification
- Kingdom: Plantae
- Clade: Tracheophytes
- Clade: Angiosperms
- Clade: Eudicots
- Clade: Asterids
- Order: Asterales
- Family: Campanulaceae
- Genus: Isotoma
- Species: I. hypocrateriformis

Binomial name
- Isotoma hypocrateriformis (R.Br.) Druce

Synonyms
- Hippobroma breviflora; Isotoma breviflora; Laurentia hypocrateriformis; Lobelia hypocrateriformis

= Isotoma hypocrateriformis =

Woodbridge poison

Species of flowering plant

Isotoma hypocrateriformis, commonly known as Woodbridge poison, is a small herbaceous perennial in the family Campanulaceae native to Western Australia. It is found in a variety of habitats in the South West, Wheatbelt and Great Southern regions of Western Australia where it grows in sandy soils around granite.

The erect, succulent and annual plant typically grows to a height of 0.08 to 0.6 metres (0.3 to 2.0 ft). It blooms between September and January producing white-blue-purple-pink flowers. Flowers are about 2.5 cm in length.

I. hypocrateriformis is known as Woodbridge poison because it resembled a toxic European plant to early settlers.
