= Amaxia theon =

Scientific classification
- Domain: Eukaryota
- Kingdom: Animalia
- Phylum: Arthropoda
- Class: Insecta
- Order: Lepidoptera
- Superfamily: Noctuoidea
- Family: Erebidae
- Subfamily: Arctiinae
- Genus: Amaxia
- Species: A. theon

Binomial name
- Amaxia theon H. Druce, 1900

Species of moth

Amaxia theon is a moth of the family Erebidae. It was described by Herbert Druce in 1900. It is found in French Guiana, Venezuela, Ecuador, Peru and Bolivia.
