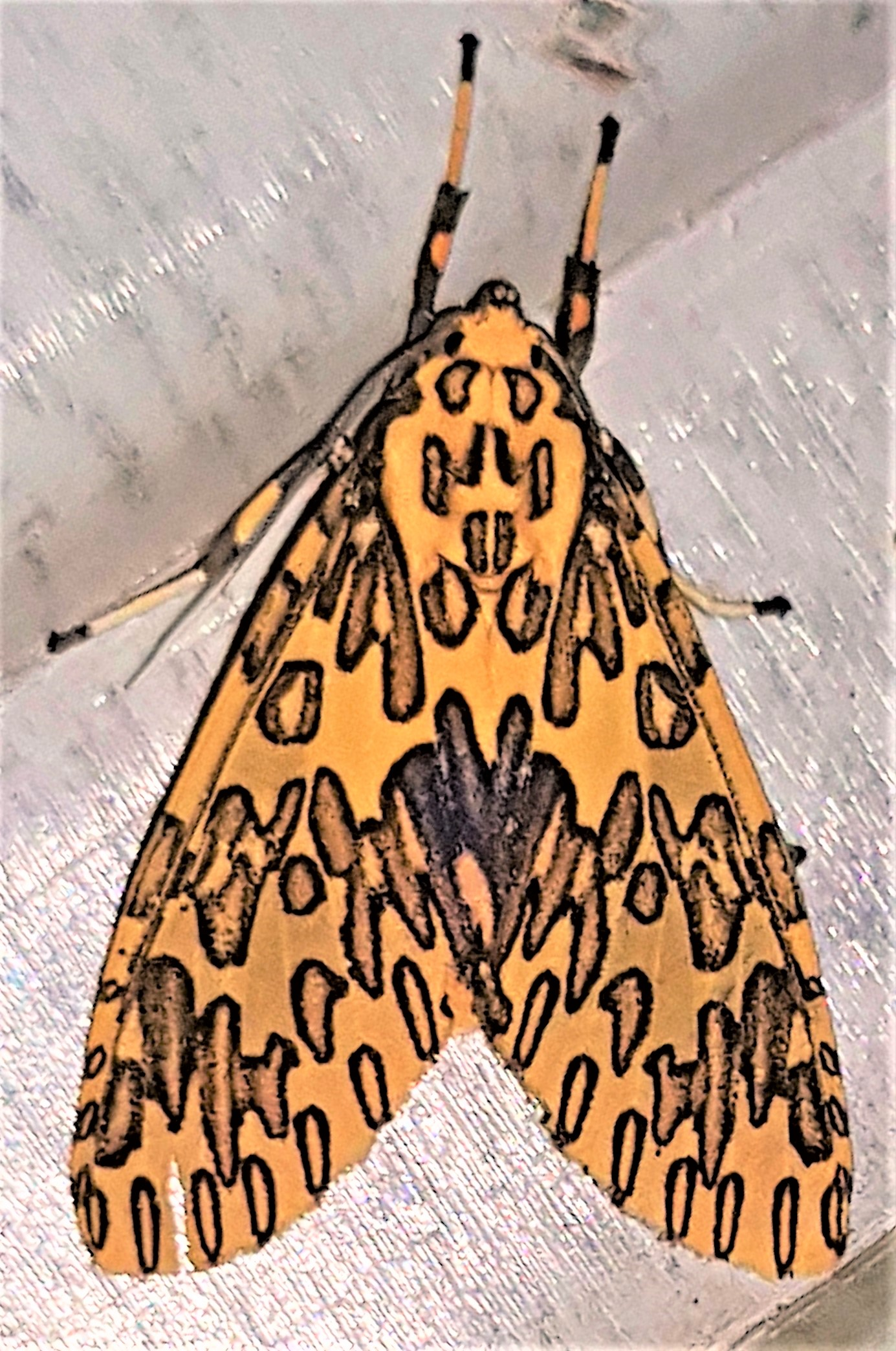
- Adult

Scientific classification
- Domain: Eukaryota
- Kingdom: Animalia
- Phylum: Arthropoda
- Class: Insecta
- Order: Lepidoptera
- Superfamily: Noctuoidea
- Family: Erebidae
- Subfamily: Arctiinae
- Genus: Amaxia
- Species: A. pandama

Binomial name
- Amaxia pandama (H. Druce, 1893)

Synonyms
- Halysidota pandama H. Druce, 1893

= Amaxia pandama =

Species of moth

Amaxia pandama is a moth of the family Erebidae. It was described by Herbert Druce in 1893. It is found in Ecuador, Bolivia, Suriname and the Brazilian state of Amazonas.
