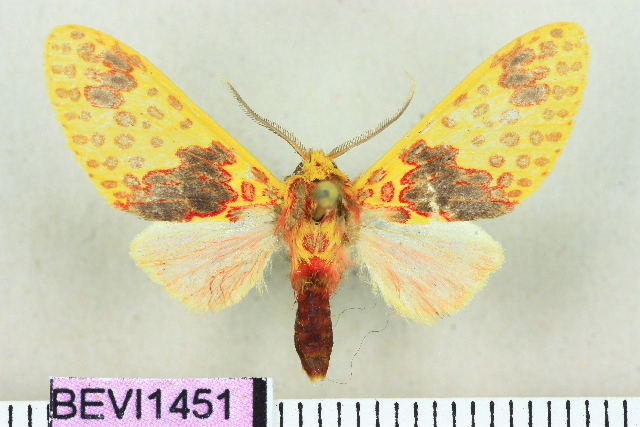

Scientific classification
- Kingdom: Animalia
- Phylum: Arthropoda
- Class: Insecta
- Order: Lepidoptera
- Superfamily: Noctuoidea
- Family: Erebidae
- Subfamily: Arctiinae
- Genus: Amaxia
- Species: A. flavipuncta

Binomial name
- Amaxia flavipuncta Hampson, 1903

= Amaxia flavipuncta =

Species of moth

Amaxia flavipuncta is a moth of the family Erebidae found in Brazil. It was described by George Hampson in 1903.
