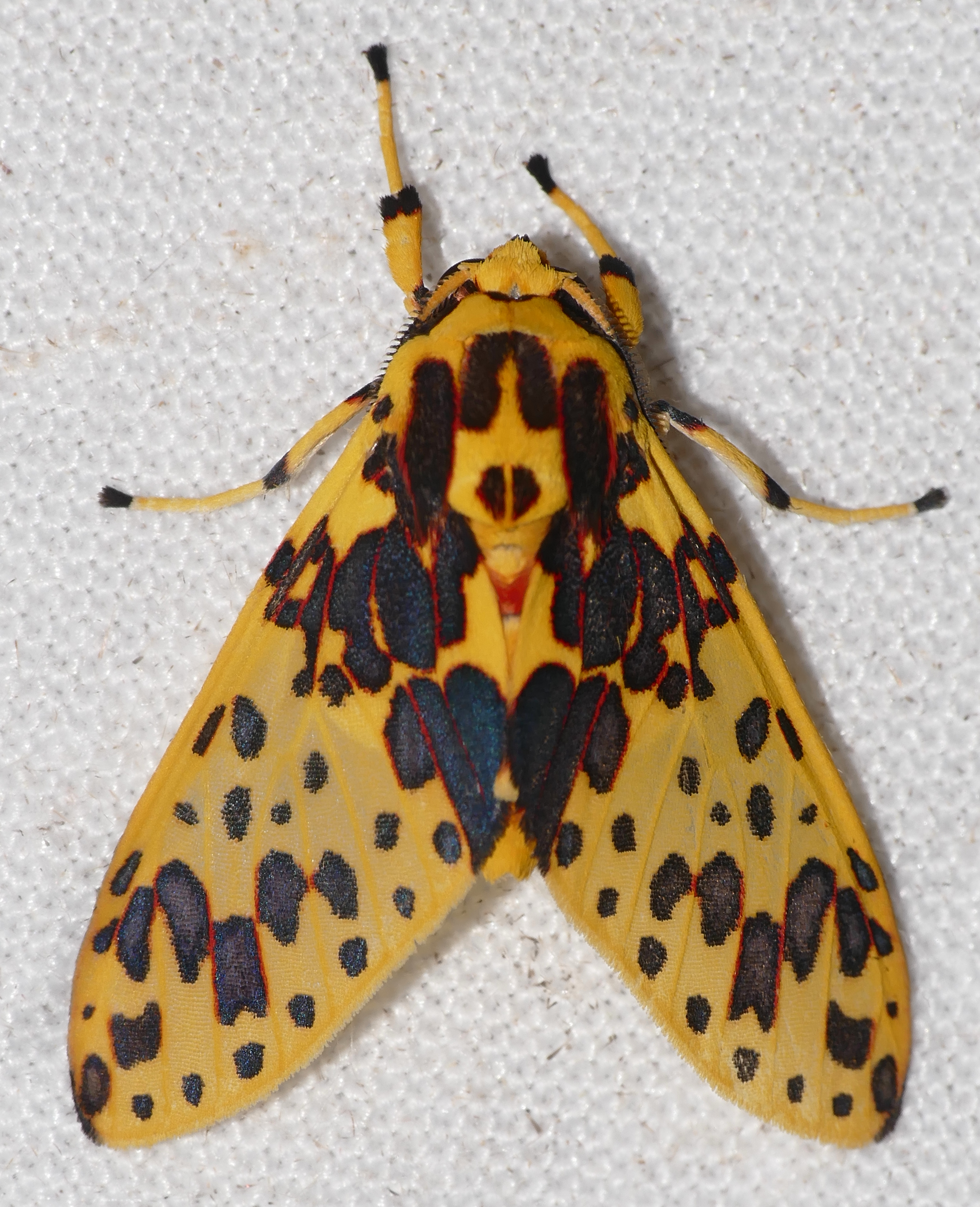

Scientific classification
- Domain: Eukaryota
- Kingdom: Animalia
- Phylum: Arthropoda
- Class: Insecta
- Order: Lepidoptera
- Superfamily: Noctuoidea
- Family: Erebidae
- Subfamily: Arctiinae
- Genus: Amaxia
- Species: A. bella

Binomial name
- Amaxia bella Schaus, 1905

Synonyms
- Neaxia bella Schaus, 1905

= Amaxia bella =

Species of moth

Amaxia bella is a moth of the family Erebidae. It was described by William Schaus in 1905. It is found in French Guiana and Suriname.
