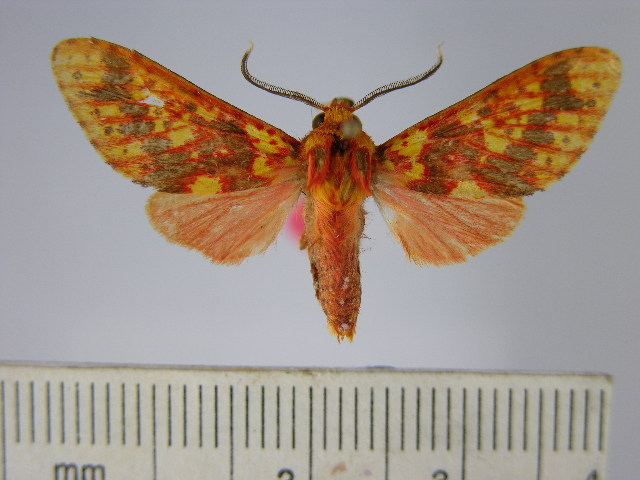

Scientific classification
- Domain: Eukaryota
- Kingdom: Animalia
- Phylum: Arthropoda
- Class: Insecta
- Order: Lepidoptera
- Superfamily: Noctuoidea
- Family: Erebidae
- Subfamily: Arctiinae
- Subtribe: Phaegopterina
- Genus: Lampruna; Schaus, 1894

= Lampruna =

Genus of moths

Lampruna is a genus of moths in the family Erebidae. The genus was erected by William Schaus in 1894.

== Species ==
- Lampruna perflua (Walker, 1869)
- Lampruna punctata (Rothschild, 1909)
- Lampruna rosea Schaus, 1894
- Lampruna rubridorsata Toulgoët & Navatte, 1996
