= Isotoma tridens =

Scientific classification
- Kingdom: Plantae
- Clade: Embryophytes
- Clade: Tracheophytes
- Clade: Spermatophytes
- Clade: Angiosperms
- Clade: Eudicots
- Clade: Asterids
- Order: Asterales
- Family: Campanulaceae
- Genus: Isotoma
- Species: I. tridens

Binomial name
- Isotoma tridens (E.Wimm.) Lammers

Species of flowering plant

Isotoma tridens is a small herbaceous plant in the family Campanulaceae native to Victoria.
