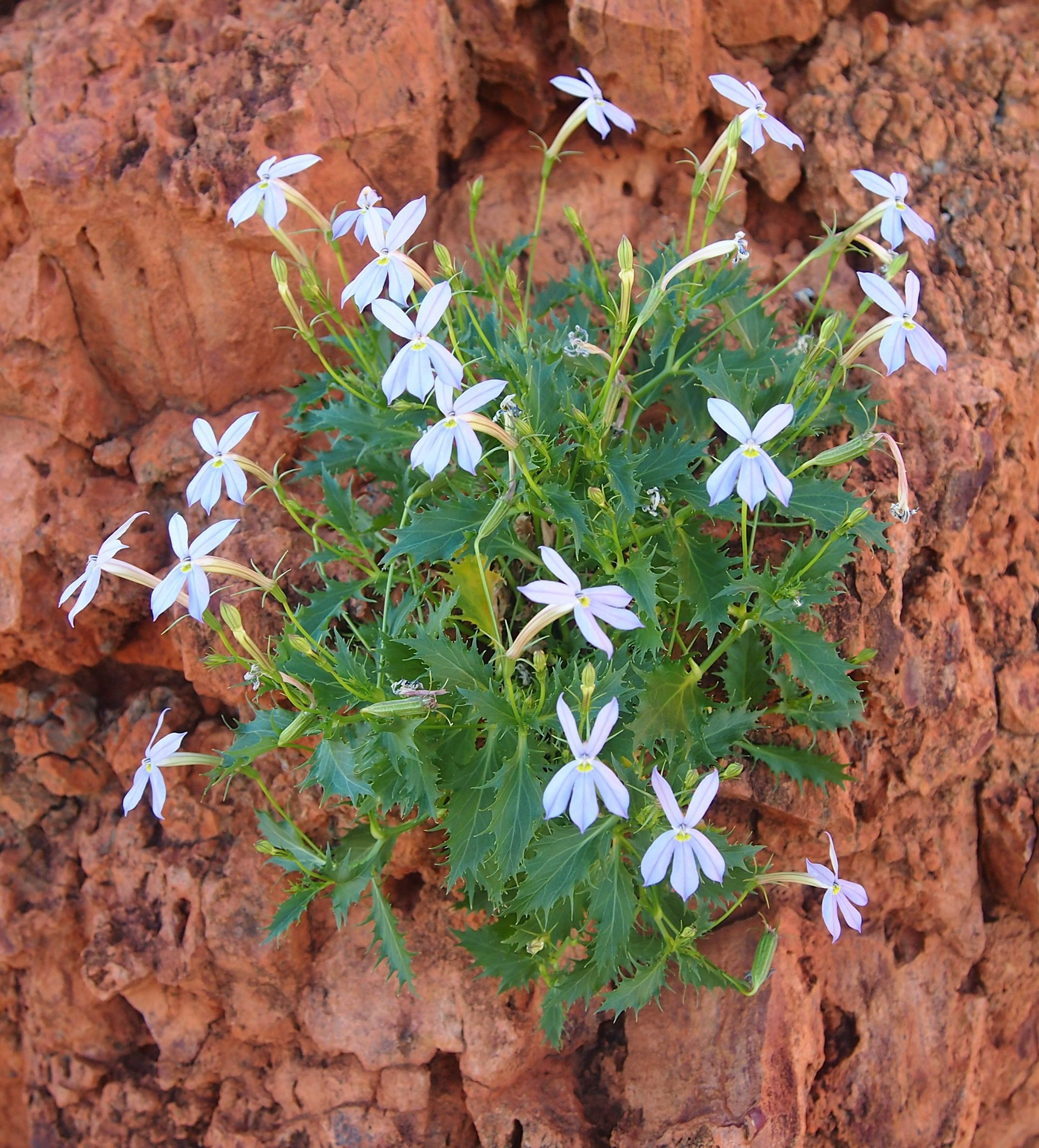
- Isotoma petraea

Scientific classification
- Kingdom: Plantae
- Clade: Tracheophytes
- Clade: Angiosperms
- Clade: Eudicots
- Clade: Asterids
- Order: Asterales
- Family: Campanulaceae
- Subfamily: Lobelioideae
- Genus: Isotoma; Lindl.

Type species
- Isotoma hypocrateriformis (R.Br.) Druce

Synonyms
- Enchysia C.Presl; Hypsela C.Presl; Isotomia F.Muell. orth. var.; Laurentia sect. Isotoma (R.Br.) E.Wimm.; Lobelia sect. Isotoma R.Br.

= Isotoma (plant) =

Genus of flowering plants

Isotoma is a genus of annual and perennial herbs in the family Campanulaceae and are native to Australia and New Zealand.

== Description ==
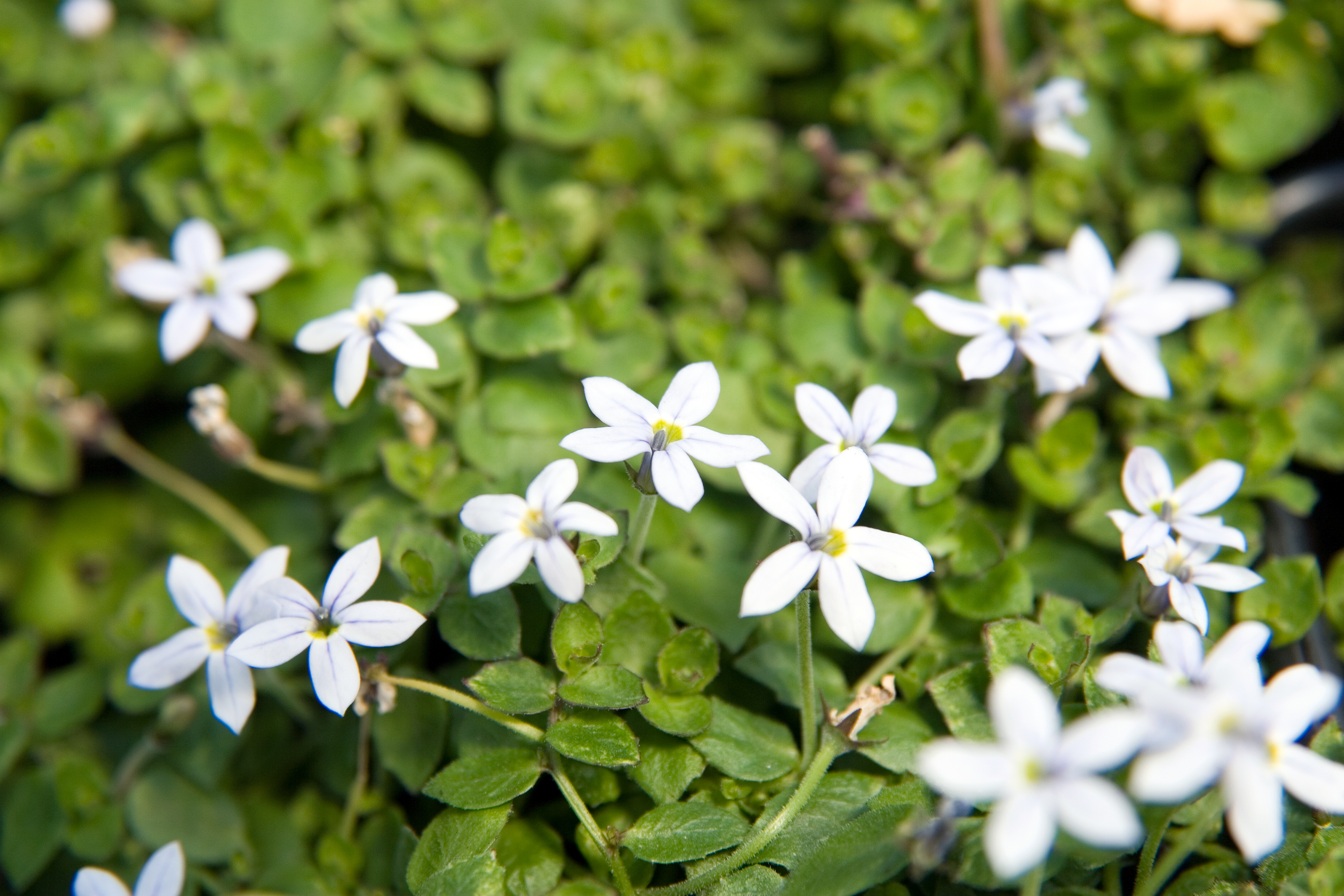
Isotoma fluviatilis

Plants in the genus Isotoma have milky sap, a distinct taproot and sometimes adventitious roots along the branches. The leaves are arranged alternately and are usually toothed or lobed. The flowers are solitary in leaf axils or arranged in groups on the ends of branchlets. The sepals form a short tube with lobes. The petal tube is slightly zygomorphic with five lobes spreading horizontally, the upper two smaller and the lower three often with distinct markings. The stamens are fused to the petal tube. The fruit is an urn-shaped or conical capsule containing a large number of minute seeds.

== Taxonomy and naming ==
In 1810, in his book Prodromus Florae Novae Hollandiae et Insulae Van Diemen, Robert Brown described Lobelia hypocrateriformis and placed it in section Isotoma. Then in 1826, based on Brown's description, John Lindley raised the genus Isotoma in The Botanical Register. The name Isotoma is derived from ancient Greek words meaning "equal" and "a piece cut off" or "a slice". The name was originally applied to a subdivision of Lobelia, because unlike true lobelias, the petal lobes are almost equal in size.

=== Species list ===
The following is a list of species and subspecies accepted by the Australian Plant Census as at September 2020:

- Isotoma anethifolia Summerh. – NSW, QLD
- Isotoma axillaris Lindl. – NSW, QLD, VIC
- Isotoma fluviatilis (R.Br.) F.Muell. ex Benth. – NSW, QLD, SA, TAS, VIC
  - Isotoma fluviatilis subsp. australis McComb
  - Isotoma fluviatilis subsp. borealis McComb
  - Isotoma fluviatilis (R.Br.) F.Muell. ex Benth. subsp. fluviatilis
- Isotoma gulliveri F.Muell. – QLD
- Isotoma hypocrateriformis (R.Br.) Druce – WA
- Isotoma luticola Carolin – NT
- Isotoma petraea F.Muell. – NSW, NT, QLD, SA, WA
- Isotoma pusilla Benth. – WA
- Isotoma scapigera (R.Br.) G.Don – SA, WA
- Isotoma tridens (E.Wimm.) Lammers – NSW, VIC
