= Laurentian =

Laurentian (French: Laurentides or Laurentien) may refer to:

- Relation to Saint Lawrence

== Geography ==
North America

- Laurentide Ice Sheet, the continental glacier covering much of North America during the Pleistocene Epoch
- Relating to the Saint Lawrence River

Canada

- Laurentia, the craton at the heart of the North American continent
- Canadian Shield, also known as the Laurentian Shield or the Laurentian Plateau.
- Laurentian Divide, also known as the "Northern Divide", a continental divide in North America
- Laurentian Mountains in Quebec
- Laurentian Upland
- Laurentian Abyss or Abyssal – a trench off the eastern coast of Canada
- Laurentides, administrative region in Quebec
- Laurentides Wildlife Reserve, in Quebec
- Saint-Lin–Laurentides, a municipality in Quebec
- Laurentien (Quebec City) (in French: quartier "Notre-Dame-des-Laurentides"), a borough in Quebec City, Quebec
- Laurentian, Ontario, a neighbourhood within Valley East, Ontario

== Other ==
- Laurentian University in Sudbury, Ontario
- Laurentian Bank of Canada
- Laurentian language, a language in the Iroquoian family of languages
- Laurentian French, the variety of the French language spoken in Canada
- Laurentian Codex, a Russian manuscript
- Laurentian library or Biblioteca Medicea Laurenziana of Florence, Italy
- Laurentian (train), operated by the Delaware & Hudson
- Pontiac Laurentian, a Canadian automobile
- Princess Laurentien of the Netherlands, member of the Dutch royal family
- Laurentien (art supplies), a Canadian brand of art supplies
- Laurentian Society, a student society of Trinity College, Dublin University
- Laurentian Consensus, a Canadian political theory

== See also ==
- Laurentia (disambiguation)
- Lawrencian, relating to English writer and poet D. H. Lawrence
