= Amaxia disconsistens =

Scientific classification
- Domain: Eukaryota
- Kingdom: Animalia
- Phylum: Arthropoda
- Class: Insecta
- Order: Lepidoptera
- Superfamily: Noctuoidea
- Family: Erebidae
- Subfamily: Arctiinae
- Genus: Amaxia
- Species: A. disconsistens

Binomial name
- Amaxia disconsistens Dognin, 1923

Species of moth

Amaxia disconsistens is a moth of the family Erebidae. It was described by Paul Dognin in 1923. It is found in Brazil.
