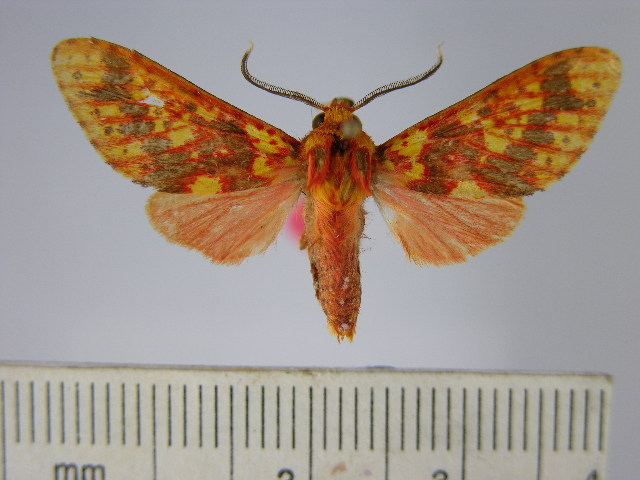

Scientific classification
- Domain: Eukaryota
- Kingdom: Animalia
- Phylum: Arthropoda
- Class: Insecta
- Order: Lepidoptera
- Superfamily: Noctuoidea
- Family: Erebidae
- Subfamily: Arctiinae
- Genus: Lampruna
- Species: L. rosea

Binomial name
- Lampruna rosea Schaus, 1894

Synonyms
- Lampruna perflua rosea; Elysus chrysellus Druce, 1901; Idalus rosea f. strigifera Seitz, 1921

= Lampruna rosea =

Species of moth

Lampruna rosea is a moth of the subfamily Arctiinae. It was described by William Schaus in 1894. It is found in Peru, Colombia, Venezuela, Costa Rica, Guatemala, Panama and Mexico.
