= Amaxia beata =

Scientific classification
- Kingdom: Animalia
- Phylum: Arthropoda
- Class: Insecta
- Order: Lepidoptera
- Superfamily: Noctuoidea
- Family: Erebidae
- Subfamily: Arctiinae
- Genus: Amaxia
- Species: A. beata

Binomial name
- Amaxia beata Dognin, 1909

Synonyms
- Eriostepta beata Dognin, 1909

Species of moth

Amaxia beata is a moth of the subfamily Arctiinae. It was described by Paul Dognin in 1909. It is found in French Guiana.
