= Amaxia flavicollis =

Scientific classification
- Domain: Eukaryota
- Kingdom: Animalia
- Phylum: Arthropoda
- Class: Insecta
- Order: Lepidoptera
- Superfamily: Noctuoidea
- Family: Erebidae
- Subfamily: Arctiinae
- Genus: Amaxia
- Species: A. flavicollis

Binomial name
- Amaxia flavicollis (Rothschild, 1909)

Synonyms
- Prumala flavicollis Rothschild, 1909

Species of moth

Amaxia flavicollis is a moth of the subfamily Arctiinae. It was described by Rothschild in 1909. It is found in French Guiana, the upper Amazon basin, Venezuela, Ecuador and Brazil.
