= Amaxia carinosa =

Scientific classification
- Domain: Eukaryota
- Kingdom: Animalia
- Phylum: Arthropoda
- Class: Insecta
- Order: Lepidoptera
- Superfamily: Noctuoidea
- Family: Erebidae
- Subfamily: Arctiinae
- Genus: Amaxia
- Species: A. carinosa

Binomial name
- Amaxia carinosa Schaus, 1920

Species of moth

Amaxia carinosa is a moth of the family Erebidae. It was described by William Schaus in 1920. It is found in Guatemala.
