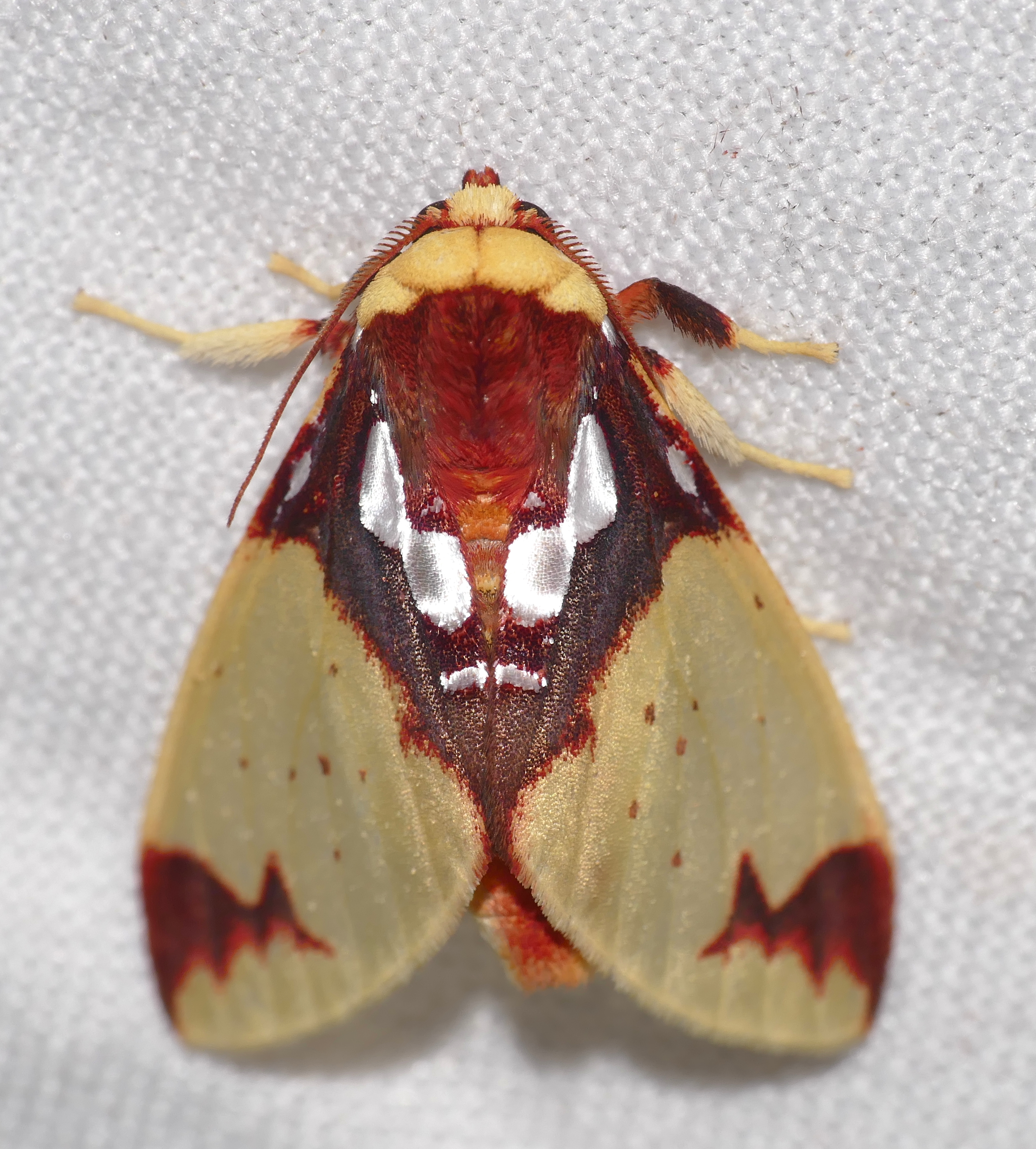

Scientific classification
- Domain: Eukaryota
- Kingdom: Animalia
- Phylum: Arthropoda
- Class: Insecta
- Order: Lepidoptera
- Superfamily: Noctuoidea
- Family: Erebidae
- Subfamily: Arctiinae
- Genus: Amaxia
- Species: A. chaon

Binomial name
- Amaxia chaon H. Druce, 1883

Synonyms
- Zatrephes chaon H. Druce, 1883

= Amaxia chaon =

Species of moth

Amaxia chaon is a moth of the family Erebidae. It was described by Herbert Druce in 1883. It is found in Ecuador, Suriname and French Guiana.
