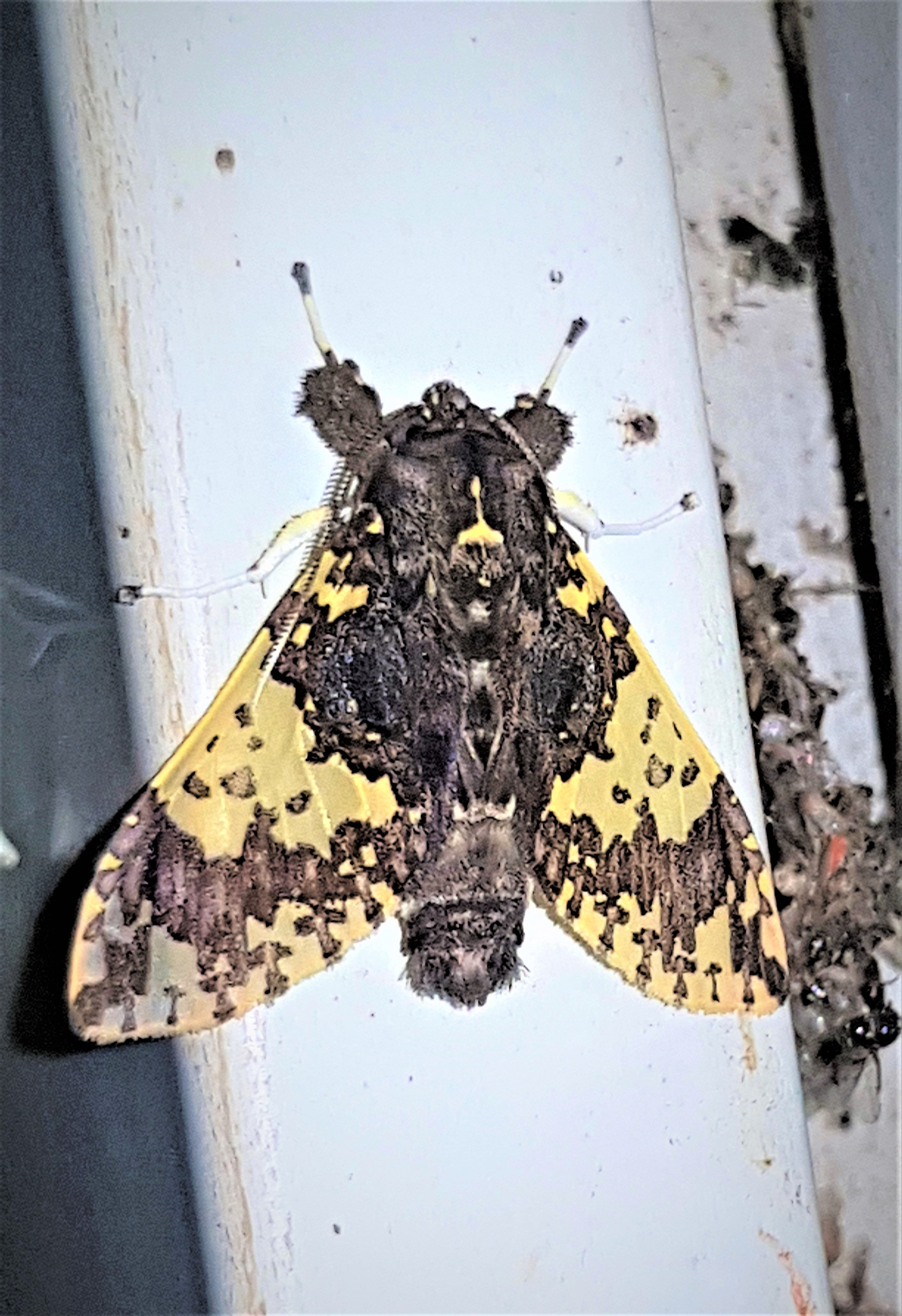

Scientific classification
- Domain: Eukaryota
- Kingdom: Animalia
- Phylum: Arthropoda
- Class: Insecta
- Order: Lepidoptera
- Superfamily: Noctuoidea
- Family: Erebidae
- Subfamily: Arctiinae
- Genus: Amaxia
- Species: A. reticulata

Binomial name
- Amaxia reticulata (Rothschild, 1909)

Synonyms
- Automolis reticulata Rothschild, 1909

= Amaxia reticulata =

Species of moth

Amaxia reticulata is a moth of the family Erebidae. It was described by Walter Rothschild in 1909. It is found in French Guiana, Suriname and the Brazilian state of Amazonas.
