= Amaxia lepida =

Scientific classification
- Domain: Eukaryota
- Kingdom: Animalia
- Phylum: Arthropoda
- Class: Insecta
- Order: Lepidoptera
- Superfamily: Noctuoidea
- Family: Erebidae
- Subfamily: Arctiinae
- Genus: Amaxia
- Species: A. lepida

Binomial name
- Amaxia lepida (Schaus, 1912)

Synonyms
- Phaeomolis lepida Schaus, 1912

Species of moth

Amaxia lepida is a moth of the family Erebidae. It was described by William Schaus in 1912. It is found in Costa Rica.
