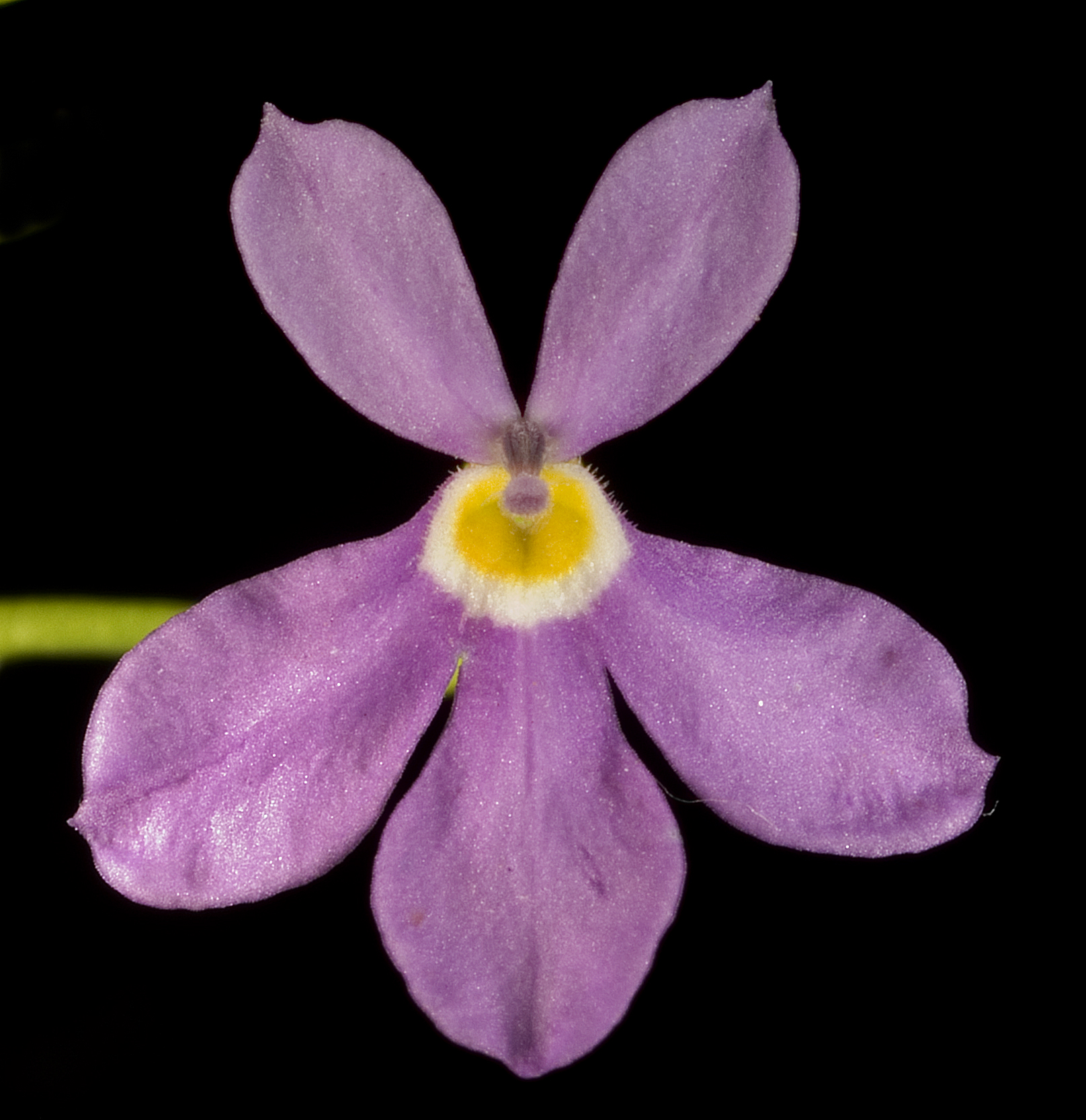

Scientific classification
- Kingdom: Plantae
- Clade: Tracheophytes
- Clade: Angiosperms
- Clade: Eudicots
- Clade: Asterids
- Order: Asterales
- Family: Campanulaceae
- Genus: Isotoma
- Species: I. pusilla

Binomial name
- Isotoma pusilla Benth.

= Isotoma pusilla =

Small isotome

Species of flowering plant

Isotoma pusilla, commonly known as small isotome, is a small herbaceous perennial in the family Campanulaceae native to Western Australia.

The erect, spreading, slightly succulent and annual herb typically grows to a height of 0.02 to 0.12 metres (0.1 to 0.4 ft). It blooms between October and December producing blue-purple flowers.

It is found in wet depressions along the west coast in the South West, Wheatbelt and Mid West regions of Western Australia where it grows in sandy-clay soils.
