= Lampruna rubridorsata =

Scientific classification
- Kingdom: Animalia
- Phylum: Arthropoda
- Class: Insecta
- Order: Lepidoptera
- Superfamily: Noctuoidea
- Family: Erebidae
- Subfamily: Arctiinae
- Genus: Lampruna
- Species: L. rubridorsata

Binomial name
- Lampruna rubridorsata Toulgoët & Navatte, 1996

Synonyms
- Symphlebia rubridorsata (Toulgoët & Navatte, 1996)

Species of moth

Lampruna rubridorsata is a moth of the subfamily Arctiinae. It was described by Hervé de Toulgoët and Jocelyne Navatte in 1996. It is found in Ecuador.
