= Amaxia apyga =

Scientific classification
- Kingdom: Animalia
- Phylum: Arthropoda
- Class: Insecta
- Order: Lepidoptera
- Superfamily: Noctuoidea
- Family: Erebidae
- Subfamily: Arctiinae
- Genus: Amaxia
- Species: A. apyga

Binomial name
- Amaxia apyga Hampson, 1901

Synonyms
- Amaxia semivitrea Rothschild, 1922

Species of moth

Amaxia apyga is a moth of the family Erebidae. It was described by George Hampson in 1901. It is found in Costa Rica.
