= Amaxia peruana =

Scientific classification
- Domain: Eukaryota
- Kingdom: Animalia
- Phylum: Arthropoda
- Class: Insecta
- Order: Lepidoptera
- Superfamily: Noctuoidea
- Family: Erebidae
- Subfamily: Arctiinae
- Genus: Amaxia
- Species: A. peruana

Binomial name
- Amaxia peruana Rothschild, 1916

Species of moth

Amaxia peruana is a moth of the family Erebidae. It was described by Walter Rothschild in 1916. It is found in Peru.
