= Amaxia pseudamaxia =

Scientific classification
- Domain: Eukaryota
- Kingdom: Animalia
- Phylum: Arthropoda
- Class: Insecta
- Order: Lepidoptera
- Superfamily: Noctuoidea
- Family: Erebidae
- Subfamily: Arctiinae
- Genus: Amaxia
- Species: A. pseudamaxia

Binomial name
- Amaxia pseudamaxia (Rothschild, 1917)

Synonyms
- Eriostepta pseudamaxia Rothschild, 1917

Species of insect

Amaxia pseudamaxia is a moth of the family Erebidae. It was described by Walter Rothschild in 1917. It is found in French Guiana.
