= Amaxia collaris =

Scientific classification
- Domain: Eukaryota
- Kingdom: Animalia
- Phylum: Arthropoda
- Class: Insecta
- Order: Lepidoptera
- Superfamily: Noctuoidea
- Family: Erebidae
- Subfamily: Arctiinae
- Genus: Amaxia
- Species: A. collaris

Binomial name
- Amaxia collaris E. D. Jones, 1912

Species of moth

Amaxia collaris is a moth of the family Erebidae. It was described by E. Dukinfield Jones in 1912. It is found in Brazil.
