= Amaxia egaensis =

Scientific classification
- Domain: Eukaryota
- Kingdom: Animalia
- Phylum: Arthropoda
- Class: Insecta
- Order: Lepidoptera
- Superfamily: Noctuoidea
- Family: Erebidae
- Subfamily: Arctiinae
- Genus: Amaxia
- Species: A. egaensis

Binomial name
- Amaxia egaensis (Seitz, 1921)

Synonyms
- Neaxia egaensis Seitz, 1921

Species of moth

Amaxia egaensis is a moth of the family Erebidae. It was described by Seitz in 1921. It is found in Brazil.
