= Amaxia fallaciosa =

Scientific classification
- Kingdom: Animalia
- Phylum: Arthropoda
- Class: Insecta
- Order: Lepidoptera
- Superfamily: Noctuoidea
- Family: Erebidae
- Subfamily: Arctiinae
- Genus: Amaxia
- Species: A. fallaciosa

Binomial name
- Amaxia fallaciosa Toulgoët, 1989

Species of moth

Amaxia fallaciosa is a moth of the family Erebidae. It was described by Hervé de Toulgoët in 1989. It is found in Mexico.
