= Amaxia corata =

Scientific classification
- Domain: Eukaryota
- Kingdom: Animalia
- Phylum: Arthropoda
- Class: Insecta
- Order: Lepidoptera
- Superfamily: Noctuoidea
- Family: Erebidae
- Subfamily: Arctiinae
- Genus: Amaxia
- Species: A. corata

Binomial name
- Amaxia corata Schaus, 1921

Brazilian moth species

Amaxia corata is a moth of the family Erebidae. It was described by William Schaus in 1921. It is found in Brazil.
