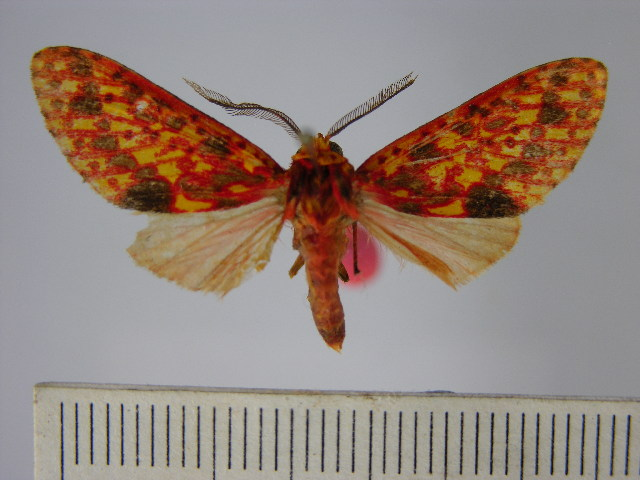

Scientific classification
- Kingdom: Animalia
- Phylum: Arthropoda
- Class: Insecta
- Order: Lepidoptera
- Superfamily: Noctuoidea
- Family: Erebidae
- Subfamily: Arctiinae
- Genus: Lampruna
- Species: L. perflua

Binomial name
- Lampruna perflua (Walker, 1869)

Synonyms
- Halysidota perflua Walker, 1869; Symphlebia perflua; Automolis perflua; Prumala ochrida Schaus, 1915

= Lampruna perflua =

Species of moth

Lampruna perflua is a moth of the subfamily Arctiinae. It was described by Francis Walker in 1869. It is found in Brazil and Ecuador.
