= Amaxia erythrophleps =

Scientific classification
- Kingdom: Animalia
- Phylum: Arthropoda
- Class: Insecta
- Order: Lepidoptera
- Superfamily: Noctuoidea
- Family: Erebidae
- Subfamily: Arctiinae
- Genus: Amaxia
- Species: A. erythrophleps

Binomial name
- Amaxia erythrophleps Hampson, 1901

Species of moth

Amaxia erythrophleps is a moth of the family Erebidae. It was described by George Hampson in 1901. It is found in the upper Amazon basin.
