= Isotoma luticola =

Scientific classification
- Kingdom: Plantae
- Clade: Tracheophytes
- Clade: Angiosperms
- Clade: Eudicots
- Clade: Asterids
- Order: Asterales
- Family: Campanulaceae
- Genus: Isotoma
- Species: I. luticola

Binomial name
- Isotoma luticola Carolin

Species of flowering plant

Isotoma luticola is a small herbaceous plant in the family Campanulaceae native to Australia.

The prostrate annual herb produces blue-violet flowers.

It is found along the banks of pools, creeks and rivers in the Kimberley region of Western Australia.
