= Amaxia hebe =

Scientific classification
- Domain: Eukaryota
- Kingdom: Animalia
- Phylum: Arthropoda
- Class: Insecta
- Order: Lepidoptera
- Superfamily: Noctuoidea
- Family: Erebidae
- Subfamily: Arctiinae
- Genus: Amaxia
- Species: A. hebe

Binomial name
- Amaxia hebe Schaus, 1892

Species of moth

Amaxia hebe is a moth of the family Erebidae. It was described by William Schaus in 1892. It is found in Brazil.
