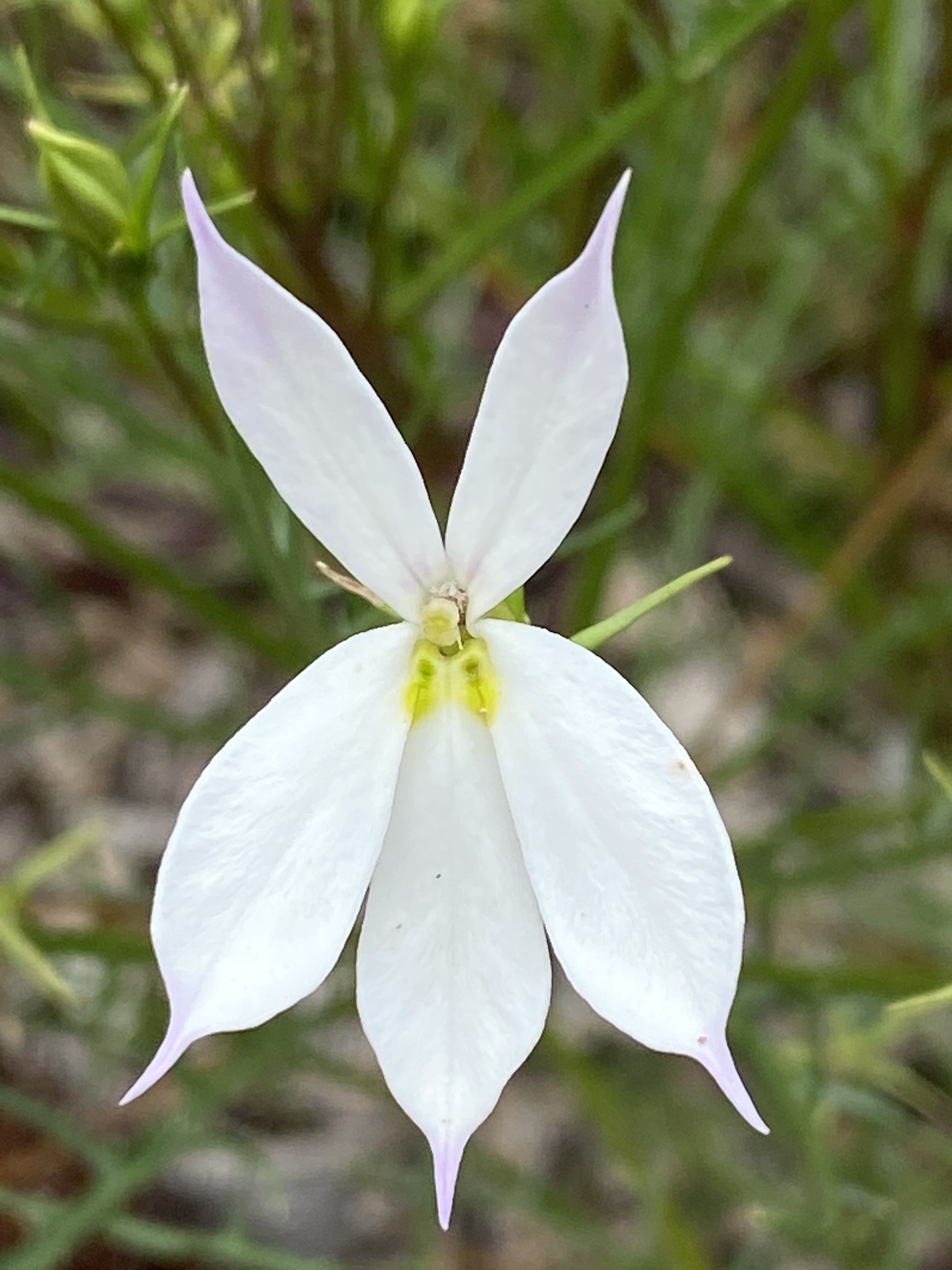

Scientific classification
- Kingdom: Plantae
- Clade: Tracheophytes
- Clade: Angiosperms
- Clade: Eudicots
- Clade: Asterids
- Order: Asterales
- Family: Campanulaceae
- Genus: Isotoma
- Species: I. anethifolia

Binomial name
- Isotoma anethifolia Summerh.

= Isotoma anethifolia =

Species of flowering plant

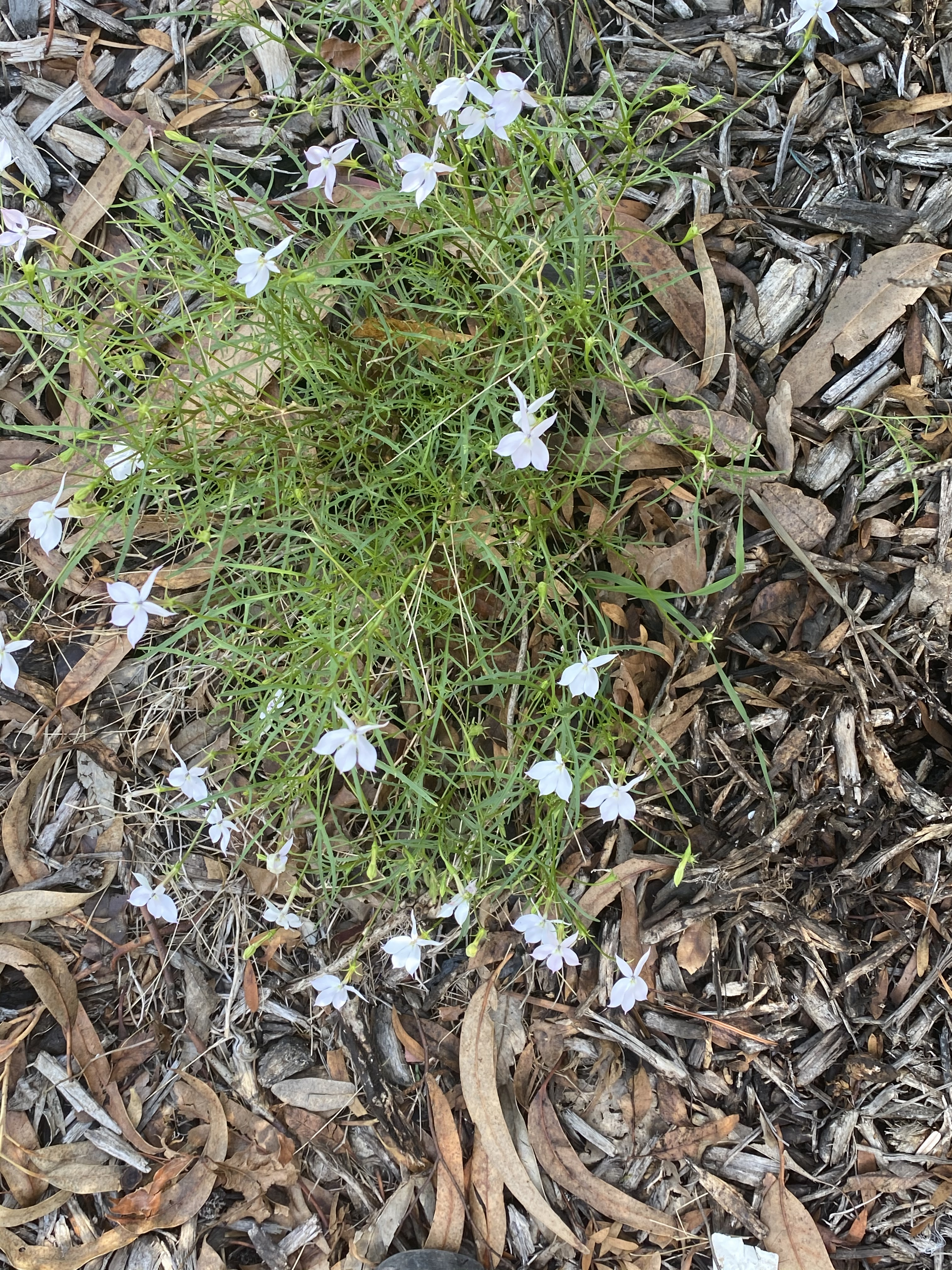
Isotoma anethifolia habit

Isotoma anethifolia is a small herbaceous plant in the family Campanulaceae and is endemic to eastern Australia. It has single, mostly white flowers in the leaf axils and slender stems.

== Description ==
Isotoma anethifolia is an upright, perennial herb with wiry stems to 40 cm (16 in) high and may have either smooth or short soft hairs. The narrow leaves are egg-shaped to elliptic, 6–10 cm (2.4–3.9 in) long, 6–50 mm (0.24–1.97 in) wide, leaf edges pinnatisect and the undivided sections 1–2 mm (0.039–0.079 in) wide, each lobe about 0.5–2 mm (0.020–0.079 in) wide. The star-shaped flowers are mostly white with a light shading of mauve or pink and single in leaf axils. The floral tube is 10–20 mm (0.39–0.79 in) long, lobes are lance to oblong shaped, pointed and occasionally toothed. The bracts shed early, peduncles 4–13 cm (1.6–5.1 in) long and calyx lobes 3–8 mm (0.12–0.31 in) long. The seed capsule is elliptic to cone shaped and 5–17 mm (0.20–0.67 in) long. Flowering occurs in spring and summer.

== Taxonomy and naming ==
This species was first formally described in 1932 by Victor Samuel Summerhayes and the description was published in the Bulletin of Miscellaneous Information, (Royal Botanic Gardens, Kew). The specific epithet (anethifolia) is derived from the Latin anethum- meaning "anise" and -folius meaning "leaved".

== Distribution and habitat ==
In New South Wales this species grows north of Ebor, in moist, rocky, humus rich soils usually on granite.
