= Amaxia fallax =

Scientific classification
- Kingdom: Animalia
- Phylum: Arthropoda
- Class: Insecta
- Order: Lepidoptera
- Superfamily: Noctuoidea
- Family: Erebidae
- Subfamily: Arctiinae
- Genus: Amaxia
- Species: A. fallax

Binomial name
- Amaxia fallax Toulgoët, 1998

Species of moth

Amaxia fallax is a moth of the family Erebidae. It was described by Hervé de Toulgoët in 1998. It is found in French Guiana.
