= Amaxia manora =

Scientific classification
- Domain: Eukaryota
- Kingdom: Animalia
- Phylum: Arthropoda
- Class: Insecta
- Order: Lepidoptera
- Superfamily: Noctuoidea
- Family: Erebidae
- Subfamily: Arctiinae
- Genus: Amaxia
- Species: A. manora

Binomial name
- Amaxia manora (H. Druce, 1906)

Synonyms
- Idalus manora H. Druce, 1906

Species of moth

Amaxia manora is a moth of the family Erebidae. It was described by Herbert Druce in 1906. It is found in the upper Amazon and Peru.
