= Amaxia juvenis =

Scientific classification
- Domain: Eukaryota
- Kingdom: Animalia
- Phylum: Arthropoda
- Class: Insecta
- Order: Lepidoptera
- Superfamily: Noctuoidea
- Family: Erebidae
- Subfamily: Arctiinae
- Genus: Amaxia
- Species: A. juvenis

Binomial name
- Amaxia juvenis Schaus, 1896

Synonyms
- Automolis juvenis; Symphlebia juvenis

Species of moth

Amaxia juvenis is a species of moth in the family Erebidae, described by William Schaus in 1896. It is found in Mexico.
