= Amaxia gnosia =

Scientific classification
- Domain: Eukaryota
- Kingdom: Animalia
- Phylum: Arthropoda
- Class: Insecta
- Order: Lepidoptera
- Superfamily: Noctuoidea
- Family: Erebidae
- Subfamily: Arctiinae
- Genus: Amaxia
- Species: A. gnosia

Binomial name
- Amaxia gnosia (Schaus, 1905)

Synonyms
- Neaxia gnosia Schaus, 1905

Species of moth

Amaxia gnosia is a moth of the family Erebidae. It was described by William Schaus in 1905. It is found in Guyana.
