= Amaxia inopinata =

Scientific classification
- Kingdom: Animalia
- Phylum: Arthropoda
- Class: Insecta
- Order: Lepidoptera
- Superfamily: Noctuoidea
- Family: Erebidae
- Subfamily: Arctiinae
- Genus: Amaxia
- Species: A. inopinata

Binomial name
- Amaxia inopinata Toulgoët, 1989

Species of moth

Amaxia inopinata is a moth of the family Erebidae. It was described by Hervé de Toulgoët in 1989. It is found in Ecuador.
