= Amaxia perapyga =

Scientific classification
- Domain: Eukaryota
- Kingdom: Animalia
- Phylum: Arthropoda
- Class: Insecta
- Order: Lepidoptera
- Superfamily: Noctuoidea
- Family: Erebidae
- Subfamily: Arctiinae
- Genus: Amaxia
- Species: A. perapyga

Binomial name
- Amaxia perapyga Rothschild, 1922

Species of moth

Amaxia perapyga is a moth of the family Erebidae. It was described by Walter Rothschild in 1922. It is found in Brazil.

== Subspecies ==
- Amaxia perapyga perapyga
- Amaxia perapyga semivitrea Rothschild, 1922
