= Amaxia violacea =

Scientific classification
- Domain: Eukaryota
- Kingdom: Animalia
- Phylum: Arthropoda
- Class: Insecta
- Order: Lepidoptera
- Superfamily: Noctuoidea
- Family: Erebidae
- Subfamily: Arctiinae
- Genus: Amaxia
- Species: A. violacea

Binomial name
- Amaxia violacea Reich, 1933

Species of moth

Amaxia violacea is a moth of the family Erebidae. It was described by Reich in 1933. It is found in Peru.
