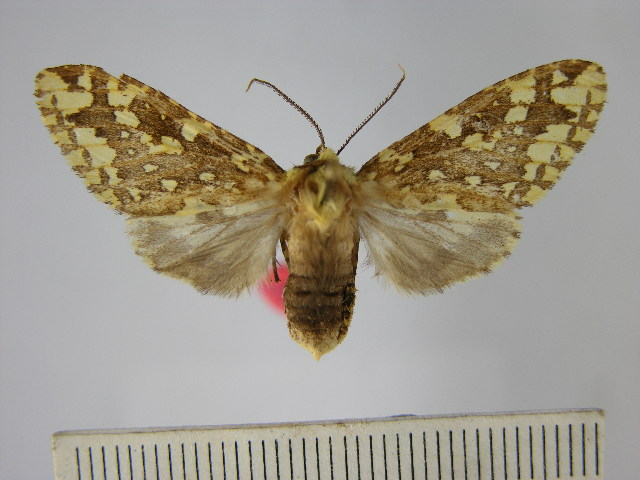

Scientific classification
- Domain: Eukaryota
- Kingdom: Animalia
- Phylum: Arthropoda
- Class: Insecta
- Order: Lepidoptera
- Superfamily: Noctuoidea
- Family: Erebidae
- Subfamily: Arctiinae
- Genus: Lampruna
- Species: L. punctata

Binomial name
- Lampruna punctata (Rothschild, 1909)

Synonyms
- Halysidota punctata Rothschild, 1909; Amaxia punctata Watson & Goodger, 1986; Symphlebia punctata Rothschild, 1909

= Lampruna punctata =

Species of moth

Lampruna punctata is a moth of the subfamily Arctiinae. It was described by Walter Rothschild in 1909. It is found in Peru.
