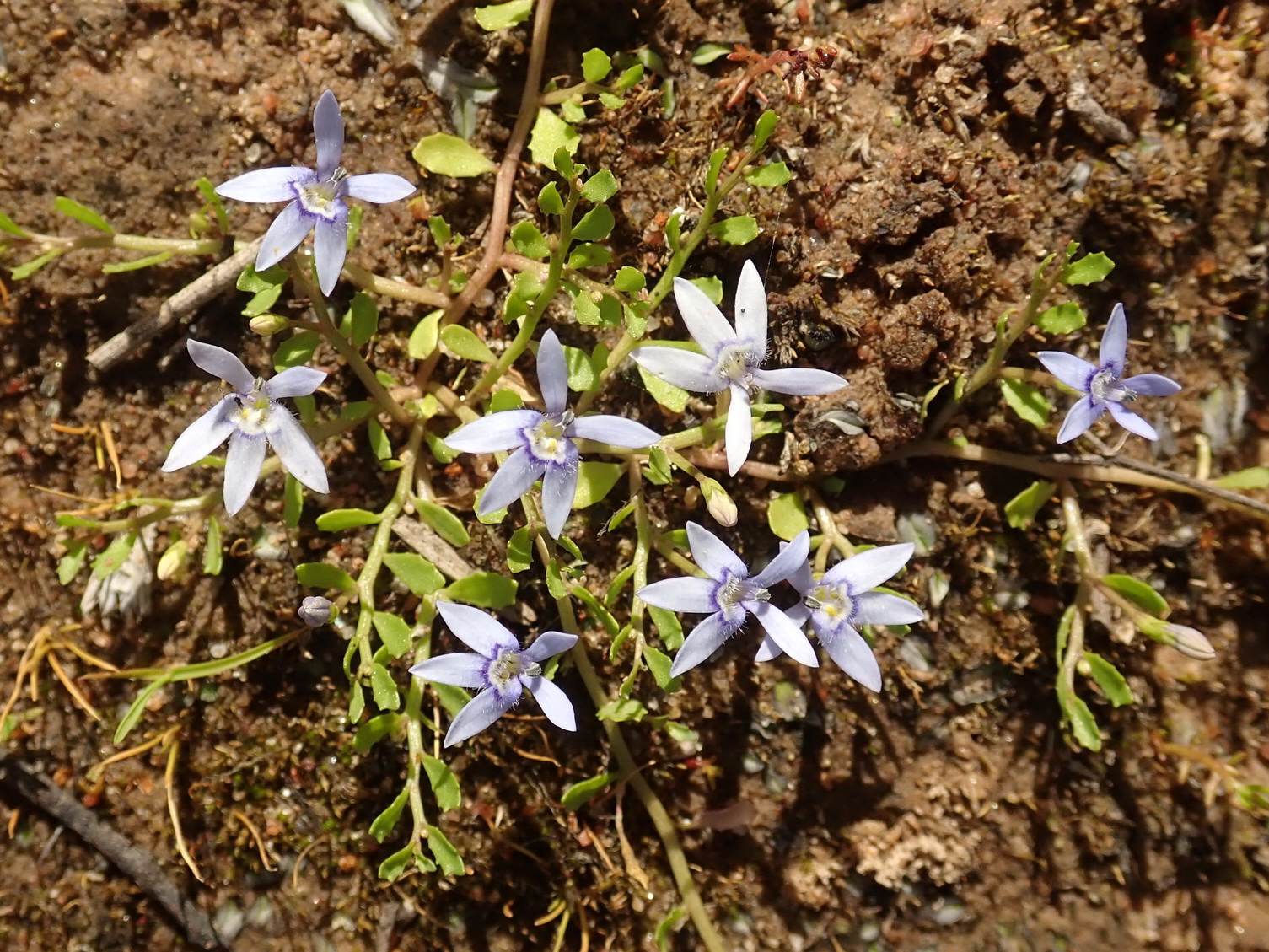

Scientific classification
- Kingdom: Plantae
- Clade: Embryophytes
- Clade: Tracheophytes
- Clade: Spermatophytes
- Clade: Angiosperms
- Clade: Eudicots
- Clade: Asterids
- Order: Asterales
- Family: Campanulaceae
- Genus: Isotoma
- Species: I. fluviatilis

Binomial name
- Isotoma fluviatilis (R.Br.) F.Muell. ex Benth.
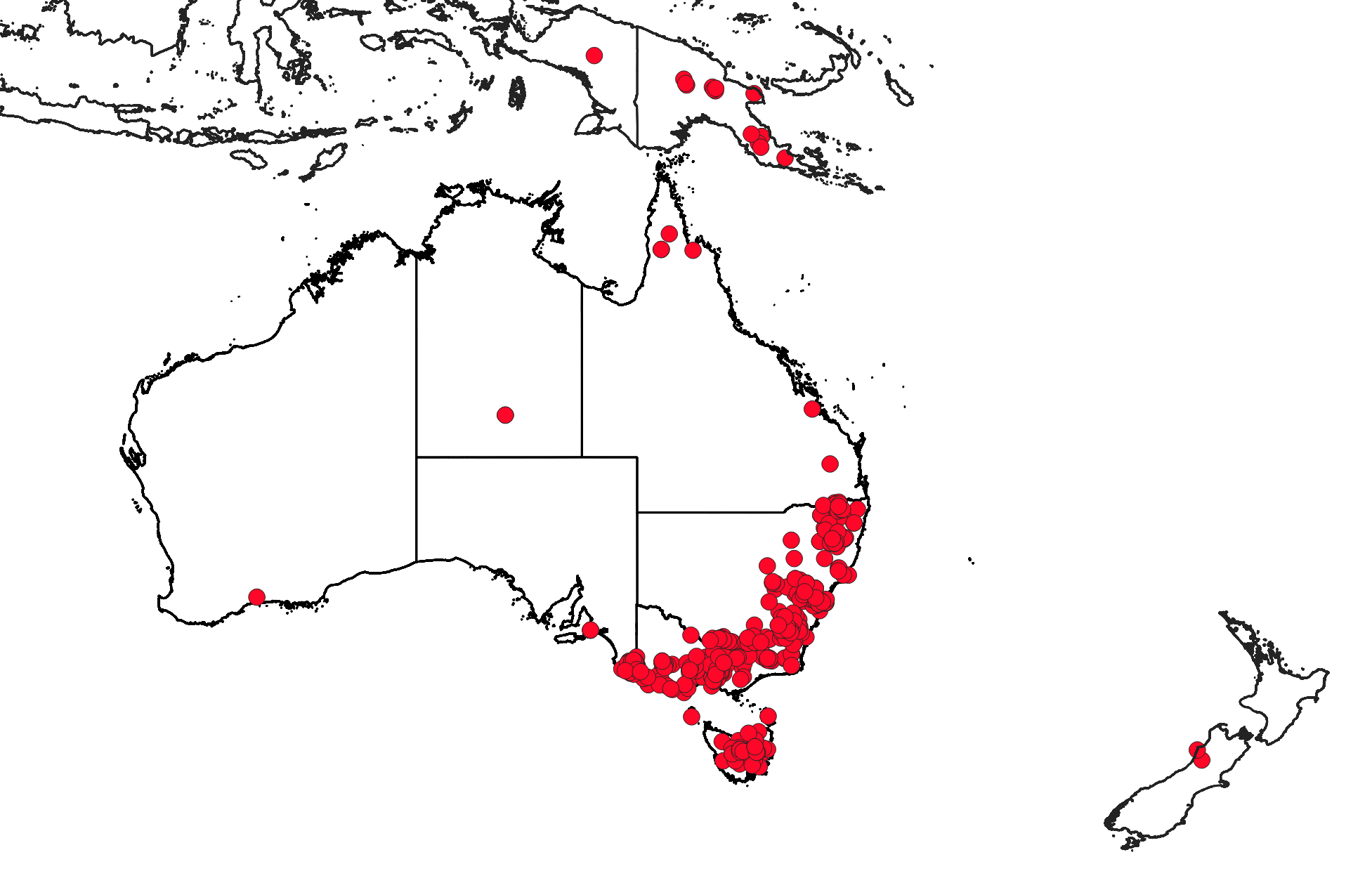
- Occurrence data from AVH

Synonyms
- Laurentia fluviatilis (R.Br.) E.Wimm; Lobelia fluviatilis R.Br.; Rapuntium fluviatilis (R.Br.) C.Presl

= Isotoma fluviatilis =

Species of plant

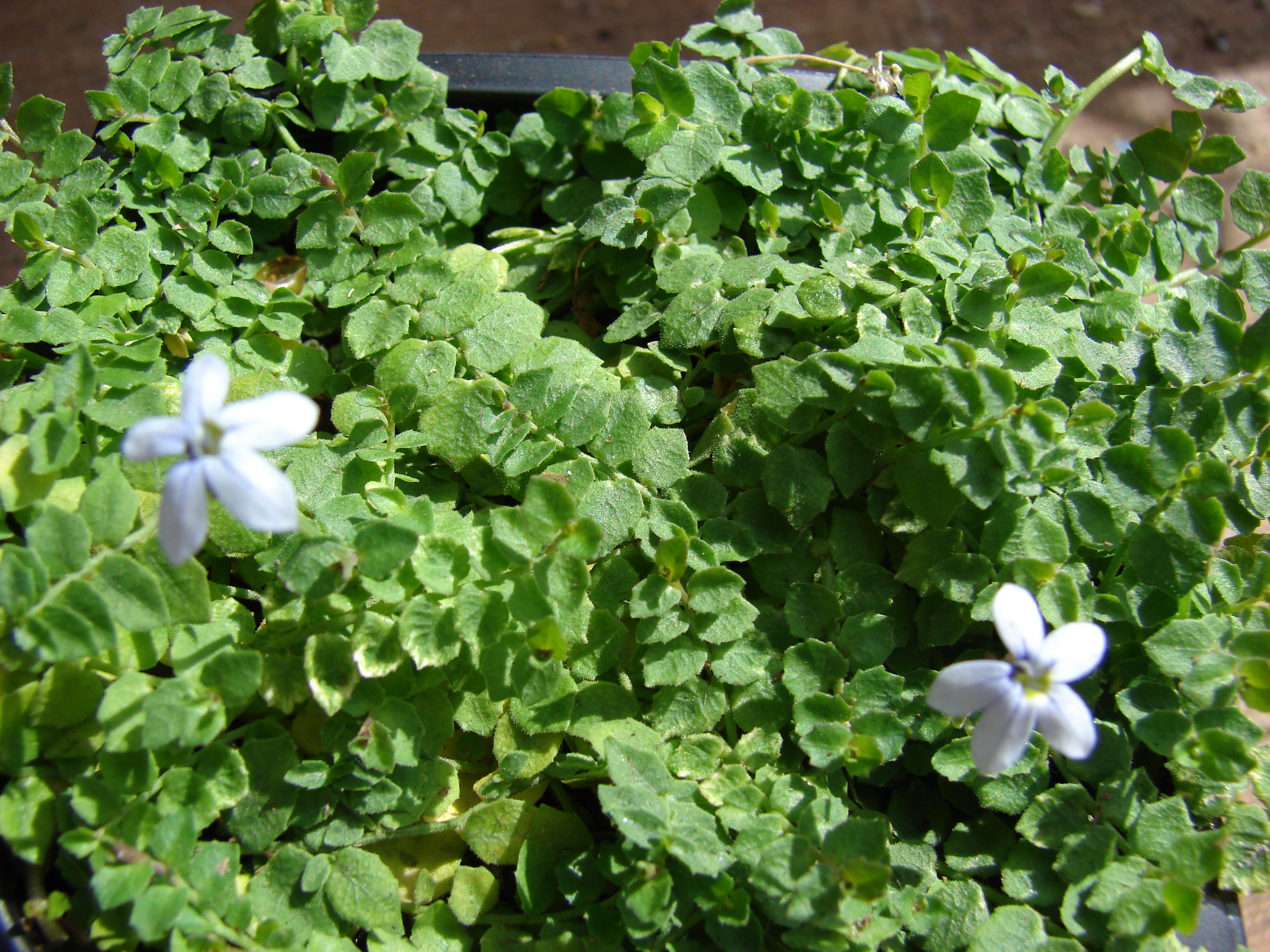

Isotoma fluviatilis, the swamp isotome or blue star creeper, is a small herbaceous perennial plant in the family Campanulaceae, native to Australia.

== Description ==
This plant often forms a low growing mat. It is usually pubescent or sometimes glabrous and roots at nodes. The deep green leaves are 4 to 12 millimetres (0.16 to 0.47 in) in length and 2 to 8 mm (0.079 to 0.315 in) wide. The leaf blade is oblong, elliptic or linear in shape, or the lower leaves may be ovate or obovate in shape.

It forms white solitary flowers that are axillary and can be bisexual or unisexual. Capsules form later that are obconical to obovoid in shape and slightly asymmetric. They are usually 3 to 6 mm (0.118 to 0.236 in) in length with a 3 mm (0.118 in) diameter.

The plant flowers during the summer months between November and March producing a carpet of white-blue five-petalled star-shaped flowers that are ideal as groundcovers in garden beds, rockeries or between paving stones.

I. fluviatilis prefers dappled sunlight or part shade and moist soil. It spreads via runners and is hardy in the US in zones 6-8. In the UK, it is hardy in coastal and relatively mild parts of the UK, and is considered generally pest and disease free.

== Classification ==
The species was first formally described as Lobelia fluviatilis by the botanist Robert Brown in 1810 in the work Prodromus Florae Novae Hollandiae and later reclassified in the genus Isotoma by George Bentham in 1864 in Flora Australiensis. Several synonyms exist for this species including; Laurentia fluviatilis, Enchysia gaudichaudii and Rapuntium fluviatile.

There are three known subspecies:

- Isotoma fluviatilis subsp. australis
- Isotoma fluviatilis subsp. borealis
- Isotoma fluviatilis subsp. fluviatilis

== Distribution ==
The species is often found growing in areas of moist sand or in mud along the margins of creeks and streams and seepage areas. It is also found among granite outcrops and wet depressions. It is found in south eastern Australia from southern parts of South Australia extending through much of Victoria, through much of Tasmania, eastern New South Wales and south eastern Queensland.
