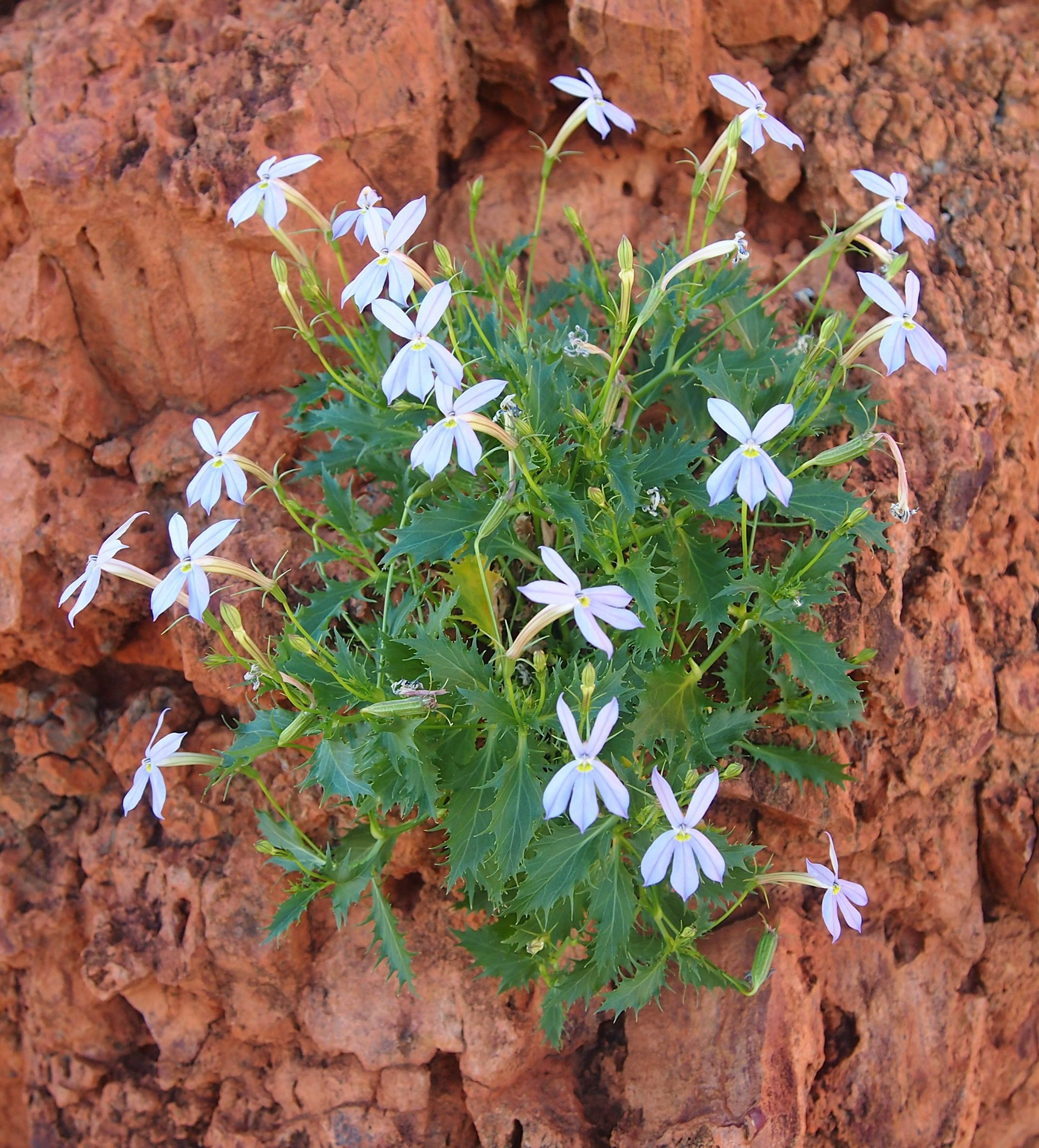

Scientific classification
- Kingdom: Plantae
- Clade: Tracheophytes
- Clade: Angiosperms
- Clade: Eudicots
- Clade: Asterids
- Order: Asterales
- Family: Campanulaceae
- Genus: Isotoma
- Species: I. petraea

Binomial name
- Isotoma petraea F.Muell.

= Isotoma petraea =

Rock isotome

Species of plant in Australia

Isotoma petraea, commonly known as rock isotome, is a small, herbaceous plant in the family Campanulaceae occurring in arid regions of Australia. It has single, purplish-blue flowers on smooth, slender branches from February to November.

== Description ==
Isotoma petraea is an erect, spreading, perennial or annual herbaceous plant with smooth branches that typically grows to a height of 0.2 to 0.6 metres (0.7 to 2.0 ft). The smooth leaves are narrowly egg-shaped to elliptic, 3–7.5 cm (1.2–3.0 in) long, 1–3.5 cm (0.39–1.38 in) wide, petiolate on lower sections sessile toward the branch apex, sharply lobed, unevenly spaced teeth and ending in a point. The blue-purplish flowers are borne singly on a wiry peduncle 8–25 cm (3.1–9.8 in) long. The calyces are narrow-triangular, pointed, 5–12 mm (0.20–0.47 in) long, corolla is mostly white and may have a flush of purplish-blue, a light green floral tube 14–20 mm (0.55–0.79 in) long with prominent veins. The smooth petals are lance-oblong shaped 9–12 mm (0.35–0.47 in) long and tapering sharply to a point. The fruit are rounded, slightly ribbed and 12–22 mm (0.47–0.87 in) long. Flowering occurs mostly in summer.

== Taxonomy and naming ==
This species was first formally described in 1853 by Ferdinand von Mueller and the description was published in Linnaea: ein Journal für die Botanik in ihrem ganzen Umfange, oder Beiträge zur Pflanzenkunde. The specific epithet (petraea) is derived from the Latin petraeus meaning "growing amongst rocks".

== Distribution and habitat ==
It is found on breakways, among rocky outcrops and in rock crevices in the Mid West, Wheatbelt and Goldfields-Esperance regions of Western Australia where it grows in shallow sandy soils over granite. In New South Wales it grows west of Wilcannia mostly on slopes and rocky locations on shallow granite based soils. In South Australia it is a widespread species growing in rocky locations.
