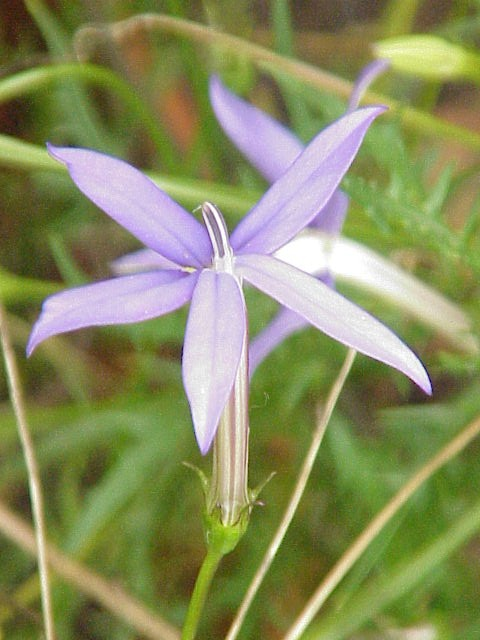

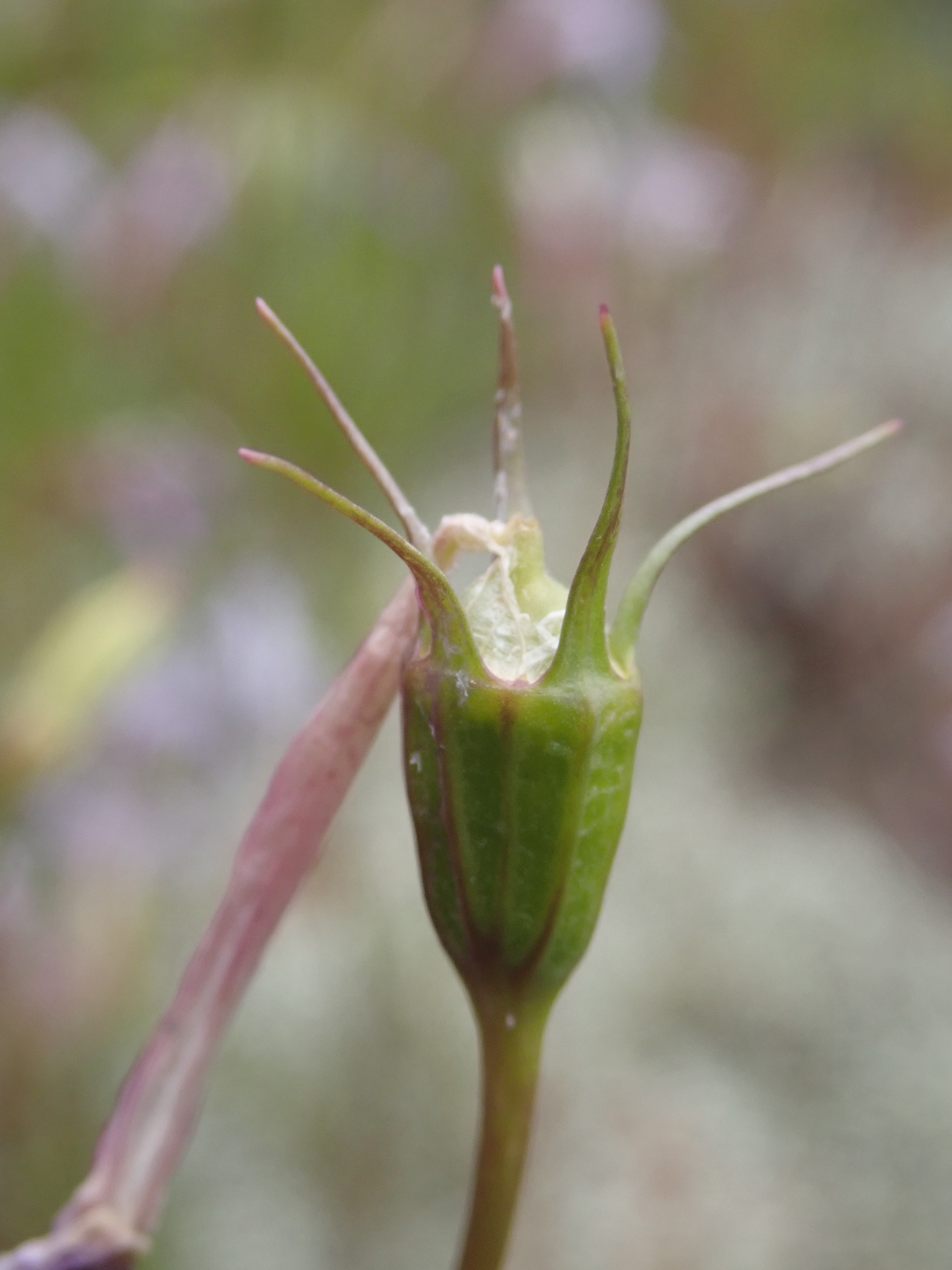

Scientific classification
- Kingdom: Plantae
- Clade: Tracheophytes
- Clade: Angiosperms
- Clade: Eudicots
- Clade: Asterids
- Order: Asterales
- Family: Campanulaceae
- Genus: Isotoma
- Species: I. axillaris

Binomial name
- Isotoma axillaris Lindl.

Synonyms
- Laurentia axillaris, Solenopsis axillaris

= Isotoma axillaris =

Species of flowering plant

Isotoma axillaris, commonly known as rock isotome or showy isotome, is a small herbaceous perennial in the family Campanulaceae. It usually has blue or mauve star-shaped flowers from September to May. It may also be called blue star, star flower, or laurentia.

== Description ==
Isotoma axillaris is an upright perennial herb growing to 50 cm high with ascending stems that are often a purplish colour and covered with short, soft hairs quickly becoming smooth. The leaves are about 1.5–15 cm (0.59–5.91 in) long and 0.5–5 mm (0.020–0.197 in) wide with deep, toothed, linear lobes sharply pointed at the apex. The single blue to mauve, rarely white or pink flowers appear in the leaf axils. The flower throat is occasionally white, greenish or a yellow colour. The five flower lobes are joined to the 15–35 mm (0.59–1.38 in) long flower tube on a peduncle 3–17 cm (1.2–6.7 in) long. The lobes are elliptic to oblong shaped, 8–18 mm (0.31–0.71 in) long, but are not joined and form a star-shaped flower. The seed capsule 7–8 mm (0.28–0.31 in) long. Flowering occurs between September and May in the species native range.

== Taxonomy and naming ==
Isotoma axillaris was first formally described by botanist John Lindley in 1826 in Edward's Botanical Register. The genus name Isotoma is from the Greek isos meaning "equal" or "like" and tomos meaning "a part". The specific epithet axillaris is a Latin word meaning "of an axil", with reference to the flowers borne in the leaf axils.

== Distribution and habitat ==
Showy isotoma occurs in Queensland, New South Wales and Victoria, often in moist crevices on rocky outcrops.

== Garden use ==
I. axillaris is grown as a garden plant. It is winter hardy to about −1 °C (30 °F) (USDA Zone 10). In colder areas, it may be grown as an annual or overwintered indoors.

== Gallery ==
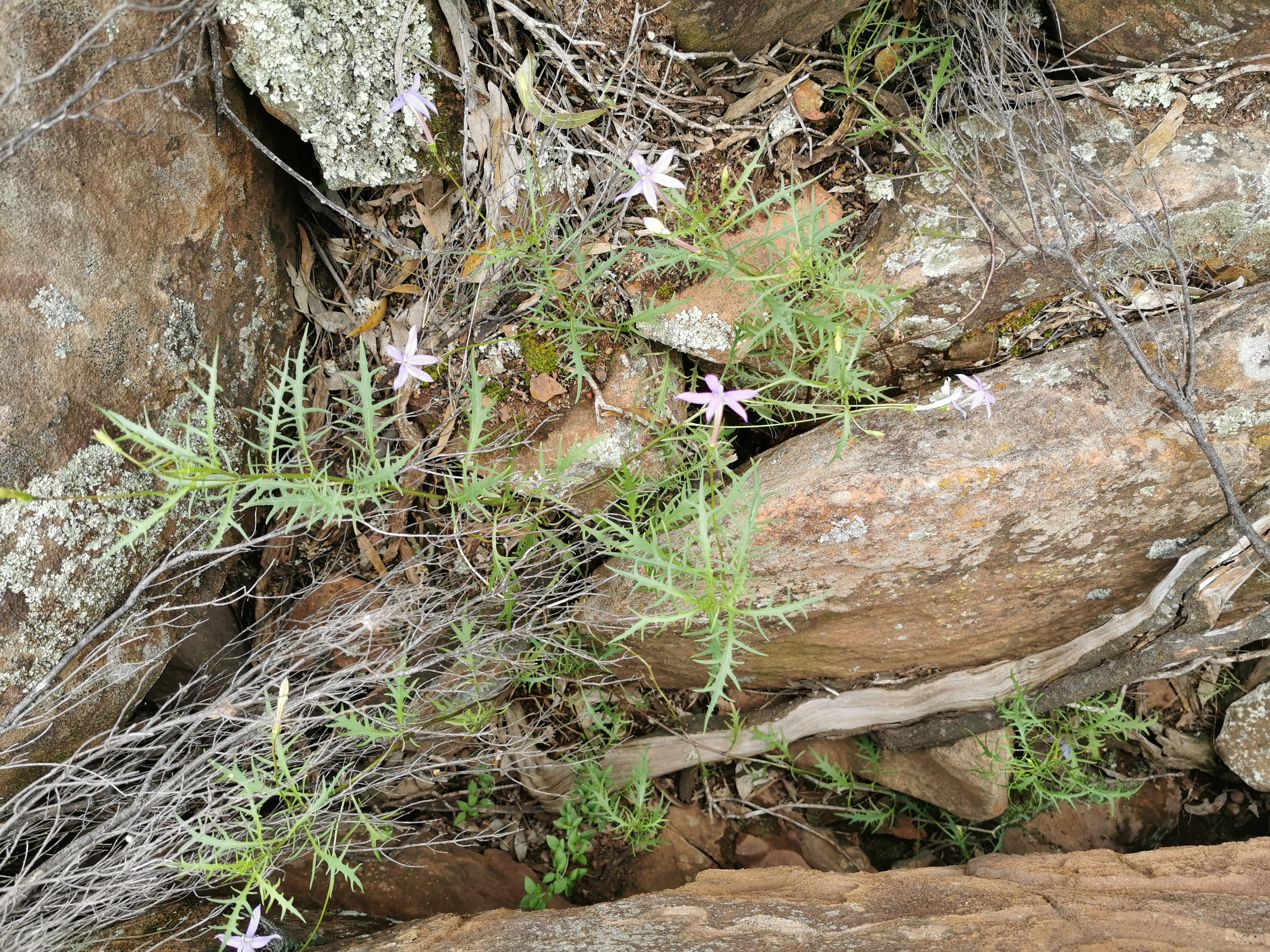
leaves

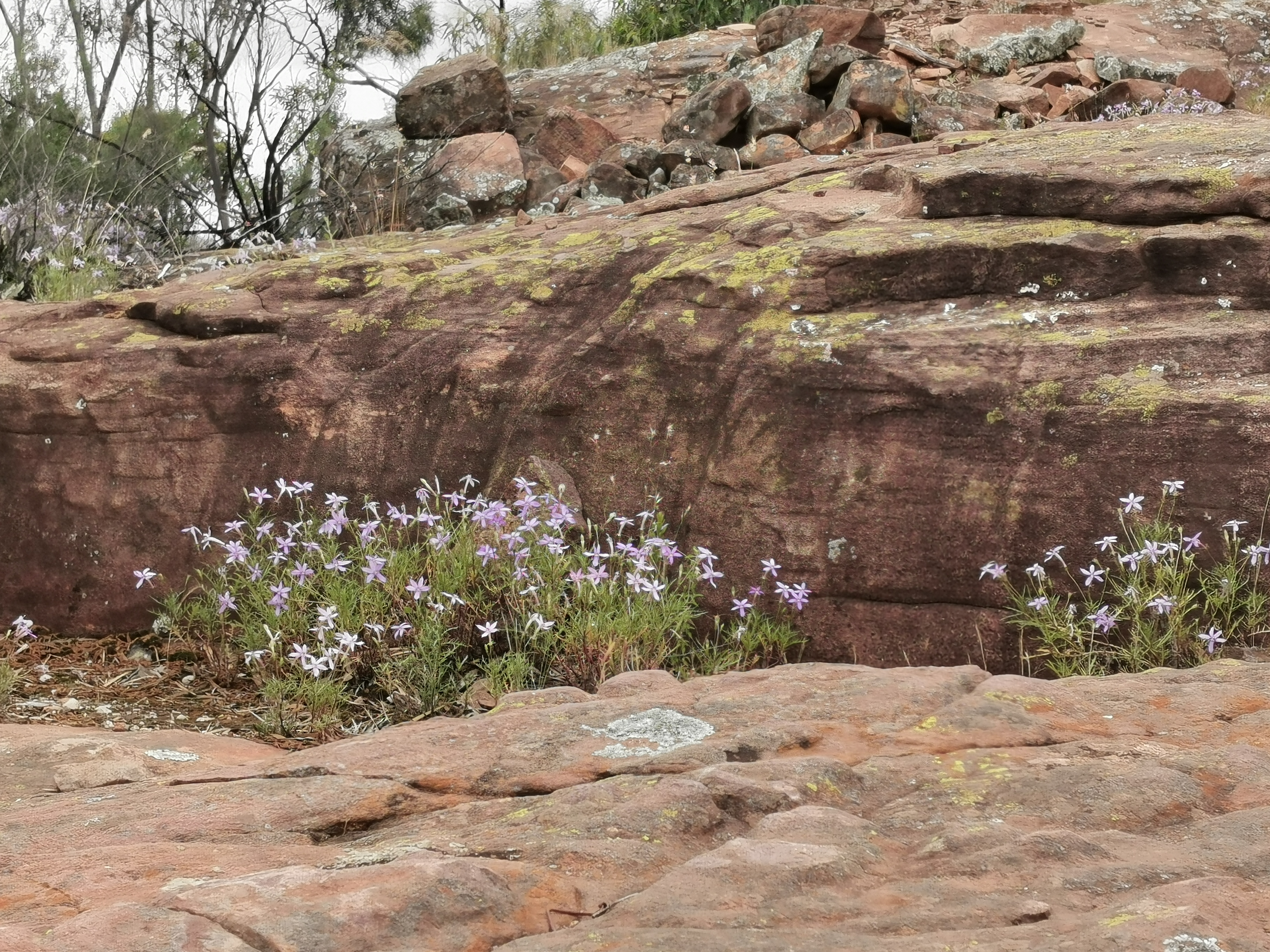
habitat

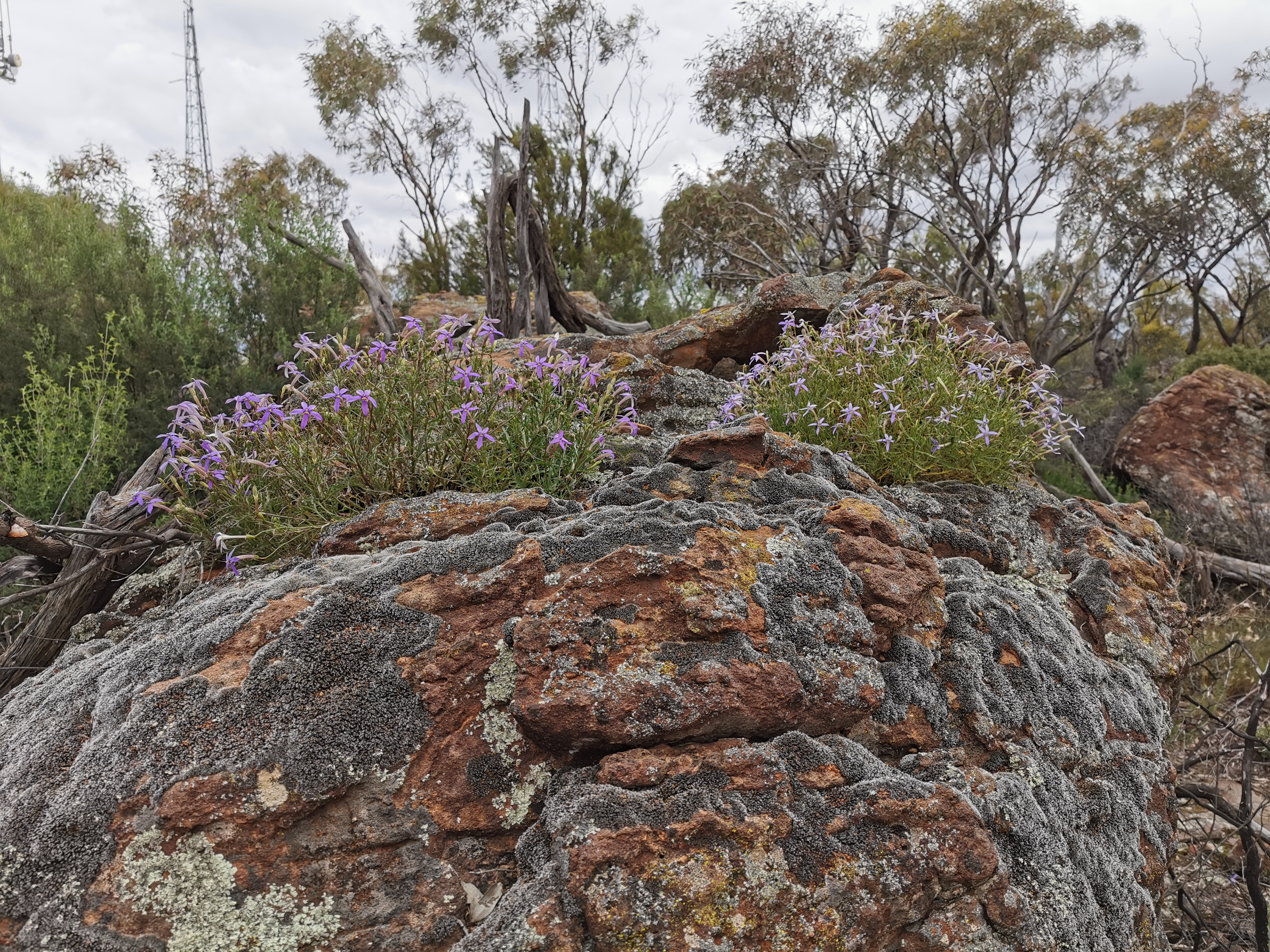
habitat

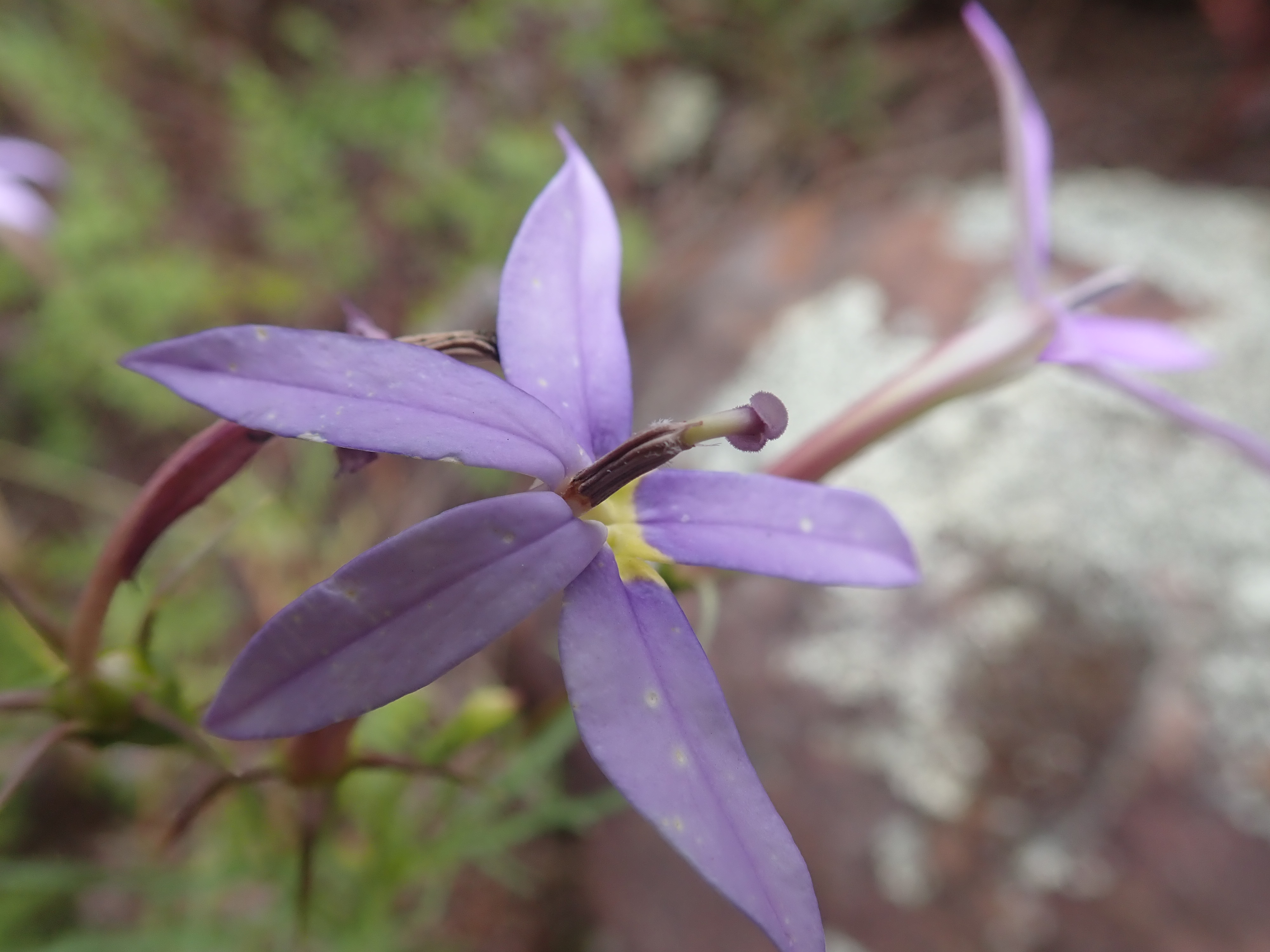
flower detail
